= List of UPMC Hospitals =

The University of Pittsburgh Medical Center (UPMC) is a $21 billion integrated global nonprofit health enterprise that has 89,000 employees, 40 hospitals with more than 8,000 licensed beds, 700 clinical locations including outpatient sites and doctors' offices, a 3.7 million-member health insurance division, as well as commercial and international ventures. It is closely affiliated with its academic partner, the University of Pittsburgh. It is considered a leading American health care provider, as its flagship facilities have ranked in U.S. News & World Report "Honor Roll" of the approximately 15 to 20 best hospitals in America for over 15 years. As of 2016, flagship hospital, UPMC Presbyterian is ranked 12th nationally among the best hospitals (and first in Pennsylvania) by U.S. News & World Report, and ranked in 15 of 16 specialty areas when including UPMC Magee-Womens Hospital. This does not include UPMC Children's Hospital of Pittsburgh which ranked in the top 10 of pediatric centers in a separate US News ranking.

Hospitals in the system
Hospital	City, State	Beds	Type	Former Network	Notes	Ranked Specialties
UPMC Presbyterian	Oakland, Pittsburgh, PA	900	Teaching Hospital		Flagship	11
UPMC Montefiore	Oakland, Pittsburgh, PA		Teaching Hospital			
UPMC Eye & Ear Institute	Oakland, Pittsburgh, PA	148	Eye and Ear Hospital			
UPMC Western Psychiatric Hospital	Oakland, Pittsburgh, PA	263	Psychiatric Hospital			
UPMC Magee-Womens Hospital	Oakland, Pittsburgh, PA	335	Teaching Hospital			
UPMC Heart and Transplant Hospital	Oakland, Pittsburgh, PA	620	Heart and transplant Hospital		Opening set for 2027, 2028	1
UPMC Shadyside	Shadyside, Pittsburgh, PA	520	Teaching Hospital			11
UPMC Hillman Cancer Center	Shadyside, Pittsburgh, PA		Cancer Hospital			
UPMC Children's Hospital of Pittsburgh	Lawrenceville, Pittsburgh, PA	315	Children's Hospital			10
UPMC Mercy	Uptown, Pittsburgh, PA	404	Tertiary Hospital	Pittsburgh Mercy Health System		
UPMC Altoona	Altoona, PA	380	Tertiary Hospital	Altoona Regional Health System		
UPMC Hamot	Erie, PA	445	Tertiary Hospital	Hamot Health		
UPMC Passavant – Cranberry	Cranberry Township, PA	35	Community Hospital			
UPMC Passavant – McCandless	McCandless, PA	394	Tertiary Hospital			
UPMC Harrisburg	Harrisburg, PA	409	Tertiary Hospital	PinnacleHealth System		
UPMC Williamsport	Williamsport, PA	224	Tertiary Hospital	Susquehanna Health		
UPMC Kane	Kane, PA	14	Community Hospital	Hamot Health		
UPMC Bedford	Everett, PA	40	Community Hospital			
UPMC Chautauqua	Jamestown, NY	199	Community Hospital			
UPMC East	Monroeville, PA	156	Community Hospital			
UPMC Horizon – Greenville	Greenville, PA	122	Community Hospital			
UPMC Horizon – Shenango Valley	Farrell, PA	106	Community Hospital			
UPMC Jameson	New Castle, PA	133	Community Hospital			
UPMC McKeesport	McKeesport, PA	213	Community Hospital			
UPMC Northwest	Seneca, PA	126	Community Hospital			
UPMC St. Margaret	Pittsburgh, PA	250	Community Hospital			
UPMC Carlisle	Carlisle, PA	165	Community Hospital	PinnacleHealth System		
UPMC Hanover	Hanover, PA	93	Community Hospital	PinnacleHealth System		
UPMC Lititz	Lititz, PA	55	Community Hospital	PinnacleHealth System		
UPMC Memorial	York, PA	98	Community Hospital	PinnacleHealth System		
UPMC Community Osteopathic	Harrisburg, PA	145	Community Hospital	PinnacleHealth System		
UPMC West Shore	Mechanicsburg, PA	150	Community Hospital	PinnacleHealth System		
UPMC Somerset	Somerset, PA	99	Community Hospital			
UPMC Kane	Kane, PA	31	Community Hospital	Hamot Health		
UPMC Greene	Waynesburg, PA	23	Community Hospital	Washington Health System		
UPMC Washington	Washington, PA	244	Community Hospital	Washington Health System		
UPMC Lock Haven	Lock Haven, PA	0	Outpatient emergency center	Susquehanna Health		
UPMC Muncy	Muncy, PA	158	Community Hospital	Susquehanna Health		
UPMC Wellsboro	Wellsboro, PA	25	Community Hospital	Susquehanna Health		
UPMC Williamsport Divine Providence Campus	Williamsport, PA	31	Psychiatric Hospital	Susquehanna Health		
UPMC Western Maryland	Cumberland, MD	213	Community Hospital			
ISMETT	Palermo, Italy	70	Transplant Hospital			
UPMC Aut Even	Kilkenny, Ireland	71	Community Hospital			
UPMC Kildare	Clane, Ireland	39	Community Hospital			
UPMC Whitfield	Waterford, Ireland	80	Community Hospital			
UPMC Salvator Mundi	Roma RM, Italy	75	General Hospital	Since 2012, jointly owned by UPMC & previous owner Rome International Hospital Management Srl (RIHM).	First private international hospital in Rome. Operating since 1951.	
