= Medical Arts Building (Pittsburgh, Pennsylvania) =

Coordinates: 40.441703°N 79.957856°W

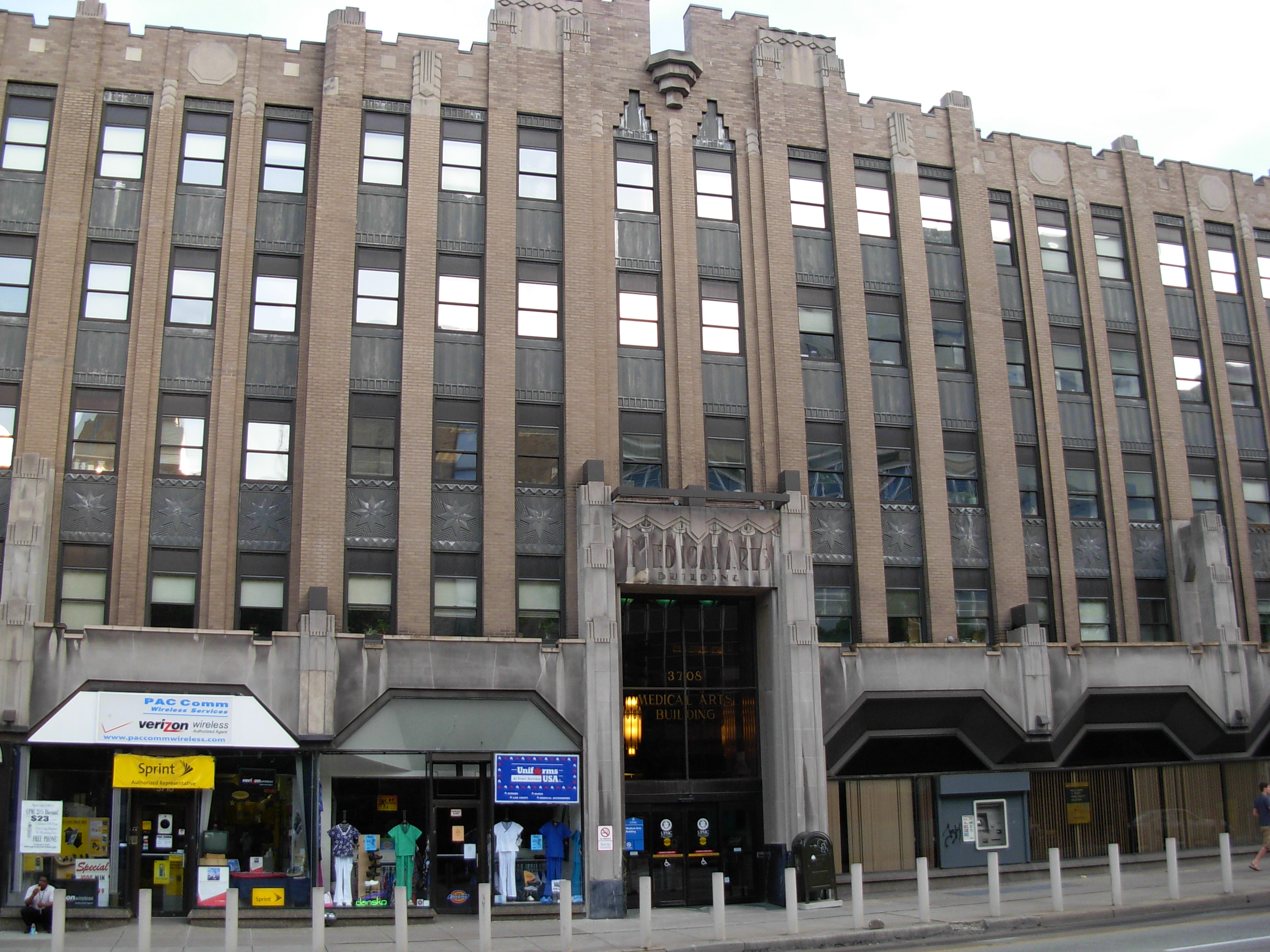
- Built: 1932
- Architectural style(s): Art Deco

The Medical Arts Building in the Oakland neighborhood of Pittsburgh, Pennsylvania is a building of the University of Pittsburgh Medical Center.

It is the headquarters of the Association of American Cancer Institutes.

It is an Art Deco-style building built in 1932 and designed by Pittsburgh architect Maximilian Nirdlinger.
