= UPCI =

UPCI can refer to:

- United Pentecostal Church International
- University of Pittsburgh Cancer Institute
- Universidad Peruana de Ciencias e Informática, a university in Lima, Peru
- United Provinces of Central Italy
