= UPMC Mercy South Side Outpatient Center =

Coordinates: 40.4256°N 79.9776°W

UPMC Outpatient Center
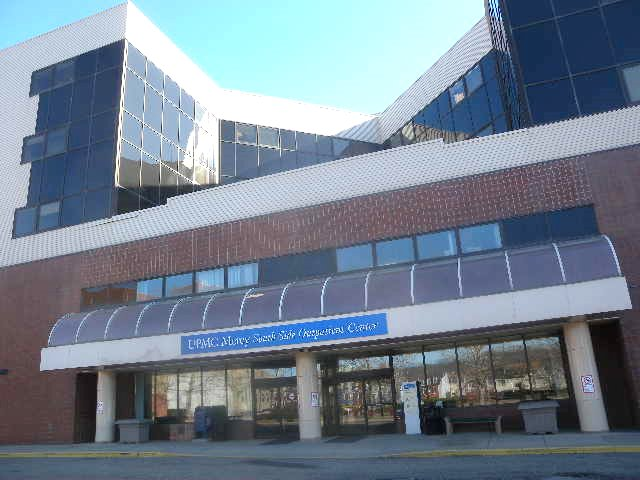
- UPMC Mercy Outpatient South Side

Geography
- Location: Pittsburgh, Pennsylvania, United States

History
- Opened: 1892

Links
- Lists: Hospitals in Pennsylvania

UPMC Outpatient Center was a 209,000-square-foot (19,400 m^{2}) outpatient facility that provided, among other services, Orthopaedic services, primary care services, and physicians offices to the residents of Pittsburgh's South Side neighborhood. UPMC Outpatient Center operated according to the directives established by the United States Conference of Catholic Bishops and would not provide or permit medical procedures that were contrary to the teachings of the Roman Catholic Church.

== History ==
Founded in 1892 as South Side Hospital, the facility quickly grew from a 30 beds located inside a warehouse on Mary Street to 70 beds. The hospital next added an annex in 1909 and a nine-story East Wing in 1950. These older facilities were demolished in 1982 to make way for the current facility which at the time cost $39 million. On May 1, 1996, the hospital merged with the University of Pittsburgh Medical Center (UPMC) to become UPMC South Side and continued to serve as a 149-bed community hospital in the UPMC system. In June 2008, UPMC announced it would close and consolidate UPMC South Side with UPMC Mercy, which is less than two miles (3 km) away, and was undergoing $75-$90 million in expansions to its campus. South Side ended its hospital designation on June 30, 2009, when the emergency department closed its doors, transferring patients to UPMC Mercy. UPMC South Side reopened as the UPMC Mercy South Side Outpatient Center on July 1, 2009. The facility ceased outpatient servies in 2018 and was sold to a developer in 2023.
