= David Geller =

American surgeon

David A. Geller MD, FACS
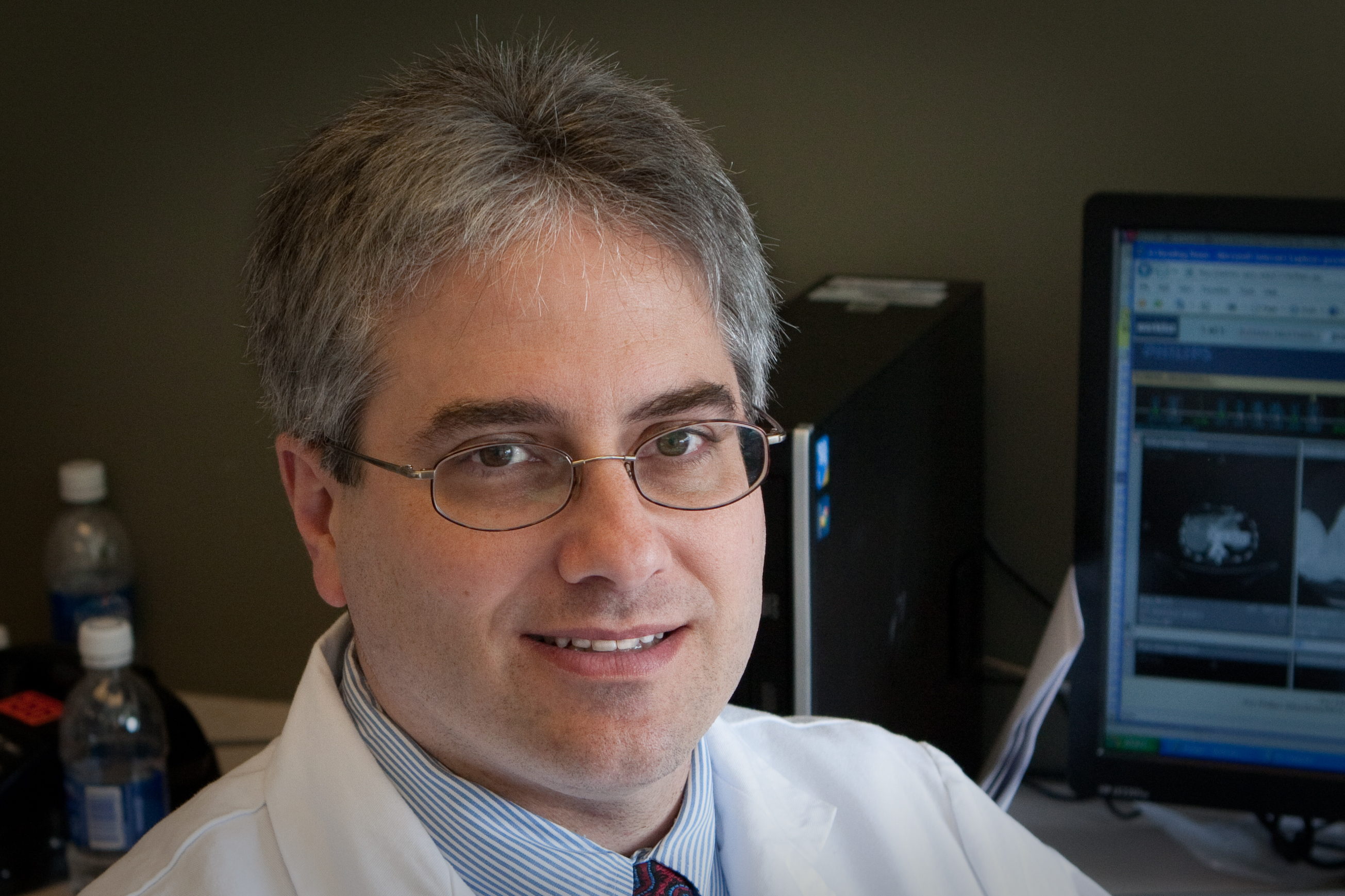
- Medical career
- Profession: Co-director, UPMC Liver Cancer Center
- Institutions: University of Pittsburgh Medical Center
- Sub-specialties: Hepatobiliary Surgical Oncology
- Research: Management of liver tumors, laparoscopic liver resections, clinical trials for liver cancer

Dr. David Geller is the Richard L. Simmons Professor of Surgery at the University of Pittsburgh School of Medicine, and co-director of the UPMC Liver Cancer Center. As a hepatobiliary Surgical Oncologist, his clinical interests center on the evaluation and management of patients with liver cancer. He has pioneered laparoscopic liver resections, and has performed more than 300 of these cases. Most of these patients are discharged home on the second post-operative day with four to five band-aid-sized incisions. He also specializes in performing laparoscopic radiofrequency ablations of liver tumors. Dr. Geller is a member of many professional and scientific societies including the American Surgical Association, Society of Surgical Oncology, Society of University Surgeons (Past President 2010), and the American Society of Transplant Surgeons.

== Research ==
Geller has published over 200 scientific papers and chapters. He is often a guest lecturer speaking on the management of liver tumors and has presented at more than 320 meetings or seminars. He has active research grants from the NIH, and is also the Principal Investigator on Industry-sponsored clinical trials for liver cancer.

== Selected publications ==
- Geller, D; Tsung, A; Marsh, J; Dvorchik, I; Gamblin, T; Carr, B (2006). "Outcome of 1000 Liver Cancer Patients Evaluated at the UPMC Liver Cancer Center". Journal of Gastrointestinal Surgery. 10 (1): 63–8. doi:10.1016/j.gassur.2005.06.032. PMID 16368492.
- Koffron, Alan; Geller, David; Gamblin, T. Clark; Abecassis, Michael (2006). "Laparoscopic liver surgery: Shifting the management of liver tumors". Hepatology. 44 (6): 1694–700. doi:10.1002/hep.21485. PMID 17133494.
- Balaa, Fady K.; Gamblin, T. Clark; Tsung, Allan; Marsh, J. Wallis; Geller, David A. (2007). "Right Hepatic Lobectomy Using the Staple Technique in 101 Patients". Journal of Gastrointestinal Surgery. 12 (2): 338–43. doi:10.1007/s11605-007-0236-6. PMID 17701266.
- Cho, Sung W.; Marsh, J. Wallis; Steel, Jennifer; Holloway, Shane E.; Heckman, Jason T.; Ochoa, Erin R.; Geller, David A.; Gamblin, T. Clark (2008). "Surgical Management of Hepatocellular Adenoma: Take It or Leave It?". Annals of Surgical Oncology. 15 (10): 2795–803. doi:10.1245/s10434-008-0090-0. PMID 18696154.
- Nguyen, Kevin Tri; Gamblin, T Clark; Geller, David A (2008). "Laparoscopic liver resection for cancer". Future Oncology. 4 (5): 661–70. doi:10.2217/14796694.4.5.661. PMID 18922123.
- Gamblin TC, Holloway SE, Heckman JT, Geller DA. Laparoscopic resection of benign hepatic cysts: a new standard. J. Am. Coll. Surg. 2008; 207: 731–6.
- Nyugen KT, Gamblin TC, Geller DA. World review of laparoscopic liver resection - 2,804 patients. Ann. Surg., 2009, 250:831-841.
- Nyugen KT, Laurent A, Dagher I, Geller DA, et al. Minimally invasive liver resection for metastatic colorectal cancer: a multi-institutional, international report of safety, feasibility, and early * outcomes. Ann. Surg. 2009; 250:842-848.
- Dagher I, O'Rourke N, Geller DA, et al. Laparoscopic major hepatectomy: an evolution in standard care. Ann. Surg. 2009; 250:856-860.
- Nyugen KT, Steel J, Vanounou T, Tsung A, Marsh JW, Geller DA, Clark Gamblin T. Initial presentation and management of hilar and peripheral cholangiocarcinoma: is a node-positive status or potential margin-positive result a contradiction to resection? Ann. Surg. Oncol. 2009; 16:3308-15.
- Vanouou T, Steel JL, Nyugen KT, Tsung A, Marsh JW, Geller DA, Gamblin TC. Comparing the clinical and economic impact of laparoscopic versus open liver resection. Ann. Surg. Oncol. 2010; 17:998-1009.
- Nguyen KT, Geller DA. Laparoscopic liver resection - current update. Surg. Clin. North Am. 2010; 90:749-60.
- Geller DA. P Preface. Liver surgery: from basics to robotics. Surg. Clin. North Am. 2010; 90:xvii-xviii.

=== On-line Videos ===
Laparoscopic resection of a benign liver mass
