= UPMC Braddock =

Coordinates: 40.405041°N 79.870208°W

Geography
- Location: 400 Holland Avenue, Braddock, Pennsylvania, United States

History
- Opened: 1906
- Closed: January 11, 2010

Links
- Lists: Hospitals in Pennsylvania

UPMC Braddock Hospital, formerly located at 400 Holland Avenue, Braddock, Pennsylvania, United States, was a full-service hospital that had served over 25 Monongahela Valley communities as a primary care facility for the Steel Valley and areas part of the Woodland Hills School District. Opened in 1906, it was merged into the University of Pittsburgh Medical Center, more commonly known as UPMC, in 1996. The hospital stopped accepting patients on January 15, 2010 and closed on January 31, 2010.

== Closure ==
Claiming that the facility was losing millions of dollars annually and was underutilized, in October 2009 UPMC's administration made a controversial decision to close the hospital on January 31, 2010. However, UPMC's figures and the extent of the hospital's underutilization were disputed. Allegations were also made that UPMC was violating civil rights laws by closing its hospital in the predominantly black community of Braddock. In January 2010, it was announced that the Office for Civil Rights of the U.S. Department of Health and Human Services would conduct an investigation. Also during this period, a community activist group, Save Our Community Hospital, was formed to attempt to stop or delay the hospital's closure. Numerous protests and demonstrations were held to protest the closing, including a "Zombie" protest march to UPMC's corporate headquarters. Ultimately, the attempt to save the hospital was unsuccessful.

At the time of the closure, UPMC indicated that 75% percent of UPMC Braddock's 600 employees had transferred to other UPMC jobs. Various proposals have been floated for the use of the hospital's building, including demolition and redevelopment that would be partially financed by UPMC. Following the closing, UPMC expanded operating hours of its Braddock Family Health Center, moved the Braddock Dental Center and the Family Care Connection of Children's Hospital to a new facility on Braddock Avenue, instituted a free shuttle service to neighboring facilities for people affected by the closing, and committed to paying Braddock $90,000 a year for five years in lieu of taxes.
