= University of Pittsburgh Medical Center =

Global medical organization

Coordinates: 40.44147°N 79.99482°W

University of Pittsburgh Medical Center (UPMC)
- Type: Private (not-for-profit)
- Industry: Health care
- Founded: 1893; 133 years ago
- Headquarters: U.S. Steel Tower, Pittsburgh, Pennsylvania, United States
- Number of locations: 40 hospitals, 800+ doctors' offices & sites (2021)
- Area served: Western Pennsylvania, North Central Pennsylvania, South Central Pennsylvania, Western New York, Western Maryland, Northern West Virginia, Italy, Ireland, China, Kazakhstan, Singapore
- Key people: Leslie C. Davis (President & CEO); Diane Holder (President & CEO UPMC Health Plan); Charles Bogosta (President UPMC International)
- Services: Tertiary level clinical care Rehabilitation; Cancer centers Community medical facilities Retirement & long-term care Health insurance Health care management Medical information technology
- Revenue: ▲US$27.7 billion (2023)
- Operating income: ▼−US$198 million (2023)
- Total assets: US$23 billion (2023)
- Number of employees: 100,000 (2024)
- Divisions: Health Services; Insurance Services; UPMC International; UPMC Enterprises
- Website: www.upmc.com

The University of Pittsburgh Medical Center (UPMC) is an American integrated global nonprofit health enterprise that has 100,000 employees, 40 hospitals with more than 8,000 licensed beds, 800 clinical locations including outpatient sites and doctors' offices, a 3.8 million-member health insurance division, as well as commercial and international ventures. It is closely affiliated with its academic partner, the University of Pittsburgh. It is considered a leading American health care provider, as its flagship facilities have ranked in U.S. News & World Report "Honor Roll" of the approximately 15 to 20 best hospitals in the U.S. for over 15 years.

As of 2016, its flagship hospital UPMC Presbyterian was ranked 12th nationally among the best hospitals (and first in Pennsylvania) by U.S. News & World Report and ranked in 15 of 16 specialty areas when including UPMC Magee-Womens Hospital. This does not include UPMC Children's Hospital of Pittsburgh which ranked in the top 10 of pediatric centers in a separate US News ranking.

== History ==
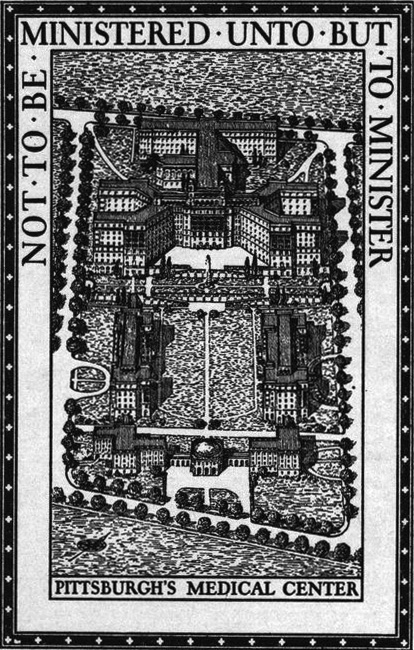
A mid-1920s plan for the new university medical center that would be located adjacent to the University of Pittsburgh's campus and medical school

=== Origins ===
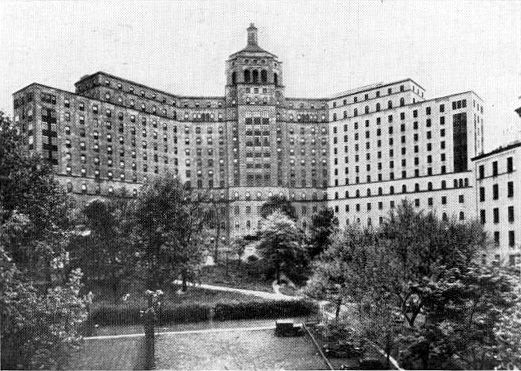
Eye and Ear, Presbyterian, and Women's Hospitals, c. 1943

UPMC has its roots in the 1893 establishment of Presbyterian Hospital, which serves as the medical center's flagship facility, and the 1886 founding of the Western Pennsylvania Medical College. Soon after its founding, the medical college became affiliated with the Western University of Pennsylvania in 1892, and in 1908, was fully integrated into the university which that same year was renamed to the University of Pittsburgh. Already having informal agreements for teaching and staffing privileges with a number of local hospitals, Pitt and its School of Medicine desired to establish an academic medical center, and by the mid-1920s had formed a plan with city hospitals to have them relocate to the Oakland neighborhood where the university had moved in 1909. The university provided Presbyterian Hospital on the North Side, with a tract of land on its campus to construct a new hospital which broke ground in 1930 and opened in 1938. By the end of the 1930s, the University of Pittsburgh had helped to form the "University Medical Center" including Falk Clinic, Children's, Eye and Ear, Libby Steele Magee, Presbyterian General, and Women's Hospital, as well as the planned Municipal Hospital.

In 1949, a new agreement between the university and Presbyterian Hospital established a three-tiered mission of patient care, research, and education, and by 1951, the hospital name was changed to Presbyterian University Hospital to reflect its close ties with the University of Pittsburgh. In 1958, the "University of Pittsburgh Health Center" comprised (1) Schools of Medicine, Dentistry, Pharmacy, Nursing, and the Graduate School of Public Health; (2) Presbyterian, Woman's, Children's, Eye and Ear, and Magee Hospitals; and (3) Falk Clinic, Western Psychiatric Institute and Clinic, Child Guidance Center, Salk Hall, and Central Blood Bank. Through the years, the university and the hospitals moved into an ever-closer alliance. In 1965, the university, Western Psychiatric Institute and Clinic which was managed by the School of Medicine, Presbyterian-University, Magee and Women's, Eye and Ear, and Children's Hospitals incorporated the University Health Center of Pittsburgh (UHCP). In 1969, Montefiore Hospital joined UHCP.

In the 1970s, a new model of administration, in which clinical revenues were invested into research, was implemented at Western Psychiatric under the leadership of Thomas Detre. After becoming one of the largest recipients of National Institute of Health funding, Detre assumed leadership of all six university schools of health sciences in the early 1980s. Implementing the same administrative model in those units, the schools of health sciences and the medical center were ultimately transformed into one of the largest centers for biomedical research in the nation.

=== Merger and expansion ===
The seal of the University of Pittsburgh, previously incorporated into the UPMC logo, can still be found on a few buildings and directional markers in and around various UPMC campuses, particularly those adjacent to the university.

Beginning in 1986, members of the University Health Center including Presbyterian University Hospital, Falk Clinic, the Pittsburgh Cancer Institute and Eye & Ear Hospital consolidated into the Medical and Health Care Division (MHCD) and led by Detre, became closely linked administratively, although Presbyterian University Hospital remained separate. In 1990, MHCD acquired neighboring Montefiore Hospital which merged with Presbyterian University Hospital to form the "University of Pittsburgh Medical Center" (shortened to UPMC), the first time that name was officially used.

UPMC then formed a network of specialty and community hospitals in 1994 named the Tri-State Health System and established a for-profit health insurance division, UPMC Health Plan, which contracted with these hospitals. In 1996, UPMC acquired South Side, Aliquippa and Braddock hospitals. Meanwhile, UPMC began to merge with several of the already affiliated Tri-State hospitals including St. Margaret Memorial, Shadyside, and Passavant hospitals in 1997 and Magee-Womens Hospital in 1998.

The acquisition and mergers consolidated the Tri-State Health System into a significant portion of the UPMC health system. Due to the immense growth of the medical center, as well as the university's concerns over financial risks associated with faculty practice in the face of national changes in health care reimbursement, the University of Pittsburgh and UPMC separated in 1998, launching UPMC as an independent nonprofit corporation supporting the university.

The university consolidated its physicians' practice plans and transferred them, along with the university's hospital management functions, to UPMC, with UPMC providing ongoing financial support to the university and its academic missions in return. The result was a mutually exclusive partnership formalized by a series of interrelated agreements and mutual executive oversights, which shares numerous board members. This created a decision-making model in which UPMC oversees clinical activity, while the University of Pittsburgh guards academic priorities, particularly faculty-based research.

Expansion of UPMC continued in 2001 as Children's Hospital of Pittsburgh began merging with UPMC. Since then, UPMC merged with Mercy Hospital in 2008; opened new Children's Hospital facilities in 2009; integrated Hamot Medical Center in Erie, Pennsylvania, in 2011, Altoona Regional Health System in Altoona, Pennsylvania, in 2013, and Jameson Health System in New Castle, Pennsylvania, in 2016; along with continued expansion of overseas operations and for-profit business ventures. In October 2016, Susquehanna Health, a four-hospital system in north central Pennsylvania, became the first domestic hospital outside Western Pennsylvania to join the UPMC system. UPMC Susquehanna merged with two additional community hospitals in October 2017.

In December 2016, WCA Hospital of Jamestown, New York, became the first domestic hospital outside of Pennsylvania in the UPMC system. In September 2017, Pinnacle Health, a seven-hospital system in South Central Pennsylvania, merged with UPMC and also with Hanover Hospital. Cole Memorial hospital partnered with UPMC Susquehanna and merged with the UPMC system in March 2018. Somerset Hospital, located in Somerset, Pennsylvania, merged with UPMC on February 1, 2019.

On February 3, 2020, Western Maryland Health System became the first Maryland hospital to join the UPMC system. Washington Health System merged with UPMC in 2024, resulting in the operation of over 35 academic, community, and specialty hospitals in Pennsylvania, Maryland, and New York, as well as over 600 outpatient sites and doctors' offices, more than 50 facilities for physical, occupational, speech and specialty therapies, and 14 retirement and long-term care site, along with its international and for-profit ventures.

=== Physicians and researchers ===
Among the renowned individuals who have worked with the University of Pittsburgh's medical center through its history are Jonas Salk who developed the polio vaccine while at the University of Pittsburgh, pediatric psychoanalyst Benjamin Spock, Peter Safar who pioneered CPR and the world's first intensive care training program at the medical center, and surgeon Thomas Starzl who perfected organ transplantation there. Other doctors include pathologist Maud Menten who is famous for her contributions to enzyme kinetics, leading orthopedic surgeon and sports medicine expert Freddie Fu, pioneering immunologist Niels Kaj Jerne, forensic pathologist and Allegheny County Coroner Cyril Wecht, Vitamin C's discoverer Charles Glen King, pediatrician Jack Paradise, leading head and neck cancer surgeon and otolaryngologist Eugene Nicholas Myers, laparoscopic liver resection pioneer David Geller, breast cancer treatment pioneer Bernard Fisher, and virologists Patrick Moore and Yuan Chang, who co-discovered Kaposi's sarcoma-associated herpesvirus.

=== Famous patients ===
UPMC has provided care to many celebrities, including Pennsylvania two-term governor and 1992 Presidential candidate Robert P. Casey for cancer, 10,000 Maniacs guitarist and founder Robert Buck for liver disease, sportscaster Bob Prince, publisher William Block, MCI CEO William G. McGowan, transplant recipient Stormie Jones and Pittsburgh mayors Bob O'Connor for lymphoma and Richard Caliguiri for amyloidosis. Pittsburgh Steelers quarterback Ben Roethlisberger was rushed to UPMC Mercy after his 2006 motorcycle crash and NASCAR driver Dale Earnhardt Jr. was treated for concussions in 2012. Pittsburgh Steelers running back, James Conner was treated at UPMC Hillman Cancer Center. The golfer Arnold Palmer, a native of Latrobe, Pennsylvania, died at UPMC Shadyside on September 25, 2016. In 2017, Manchester United striker Zlatan Ibrahimović traveled to a UPMC facility to have surgery to repair his torn anterior cruciate ligament.

== Operations ==
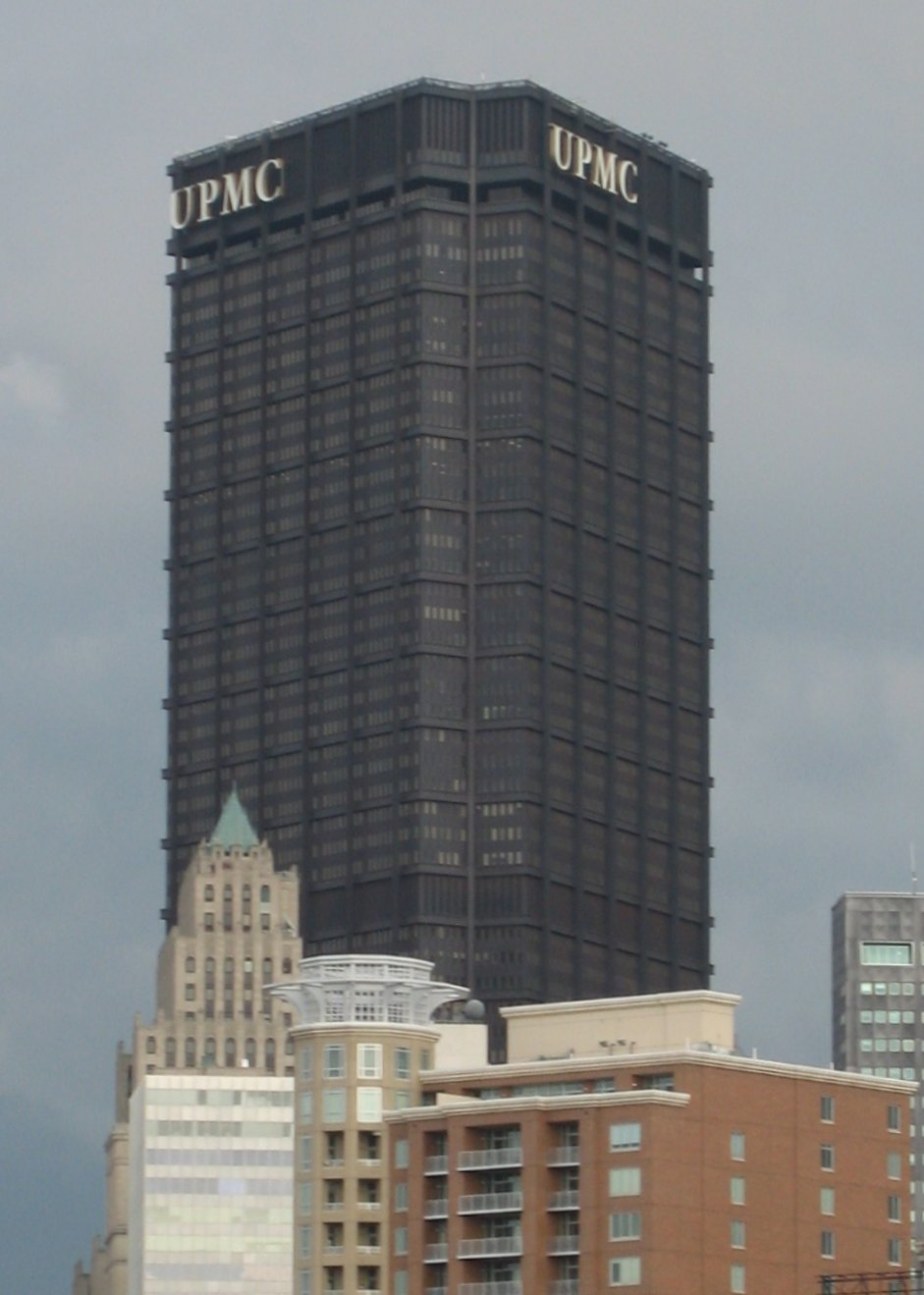
The administrative headquarters for UPMC are located at the top of the U.S. Steel Tower, Pittsburgh's tallest building

Administratively headquartered in 29 floors of the U.S. Steel Tower in Pittsburgh's Central Business District, UPMC operates as a complete and integrated health provider system that, although legally separate from the University of Pittsburgh, identifies it as a supported organization in its articles of incorporation and remains closely affiliated with the university and its Schools of the Health Sciences including via the existence of mutual board memberships and subsidization of the university's academic programs. Under a collaborative and coordinated decision-making model, UPMC oversees all clinical activity, including a consolidated physicians' practice plan consisting of university faculty, while the University of Pittsburgh remains the guardian of all academic priorities, particularly faculty-based research.

UPMC's 24-member Board of Directors equally splits representation between three groups: the University of Pittsburgh, the community at-large, and individuals historically involved in the governance of its system's hospitals. UPMC is composed of three major operating components: Provider Services, Insurance Services, and International and Commercial Services. The latter two divisions include the for-profit health insurance company (UPMC Health Plan) and a for-profit International and Commercial Services Division that seeks to bring health care, management, and technologies to market throughout the world. UPMC is the largest employer in the state of Pennsylvania.

=== Health Services division ===
UPMC's Provider Services consists of an array of clinical capabilities that includes hospitals, specialty service lines (including transplantation, behavioral health, cancer care, children's health, women's health, and rehabilitation services among other centers, institutes, and services), contract services (emergency medicine, pharmacy, and laboratory), supporting foundations, captive insurance programs, and approximately 3,600 employed physicians with associated practices. Hospital activity is categorized in four distinct groups: 1. academic hospitals that provide comprehensive clinical services and specialty services and that are the primary academic and teaching centers; 2. community hospitals that provide core clinical services to suburban populations; 3. regional hospitals that provide clinical core services to broader areas of the Western Pennsylvania region; and 4. pre- and post-acute care capabilities that include a network of home health services (UPMC HomeCare) and a network of 15 senior living facilities (UPMC Senior Communities).

=== Insurance Services division ===
UPMC Insurance Services, operating under the umbrella UPMC Health Plan brand, was founded in 1998 and includes various for-profit and non-profit health care financing initiatives. The integrated products of the UPMC Insurance Services Division include UPMC Health Plan (HMO), UPMC Health Network (PPO), Workpartners (workers' compensation and disability for employers), UPMC for Life (Medicare products), UPMC for You (HMO for Medical Assistance beneficiaries), UPMC for Kids, Community Care Behavioral Health Organization (a non-profit behavioral health PPO for Medical Assistance beneficiaries) and Community HealthChoices. These products combine to offer a full range of HMOs, PPOs, and EPOs for group health insurance, Medicare, CHIP, Medical Assistance, behavioral health, employee assistance, and workers' compensation products and services. UPMC also offers consumer-directed health plans like health savings accounts and health reimbursement arrangements. UPMC's provider networks total more than 138 hospitals and more than 16,500 physicians across Pennsylvania and has around three million members making it the largest insurer in Western Pennsylvania. It is also ranked as one of the top commercial health plans in the United States according to U.S. News & World Report. Also included in the Health Services Division are LifeSolutions, an employee assistance program; EBenefits Solutions, a web-based human resources consulting and benefits administration services; and Askesis Development Group, a software development group for behavioral health care.

=== International and Enterprise divisions ===
UPMC's International and Commercial Services Division (ICSD) actively manages UPMC's for-profit companies that seek to commercialize its expertise in health care, advanced technologies, and management skills to global markets. Its stated goal is "to advance UPMC's mission of positively transforming the way health care is provided in the U.S. and abroad, while revitalizing the economy of western Pennsylvania."

UPMC International provides health care consulting and management services around the world in areas in various areas including clinical program development, facility and construction planning, clinical investigation, clinical and administrative staff training, and health information technology, and quality, safety, and Innovation.

UPMC Enterprises is an innovation and commercialization arm of UPMC which has invested over $700 million in about 80 different ventures in the past twenty years. It seeks to create products and business arising from translational science and technology solutions by collaborating with entrepreneurs. In the past, it has also forged collaborations with companies such as dbMotion) and strategic and commercial product development partnerships with companies such as IBM and Alcatel-Lucent. UPMC Enterprises portfolio includes such companies as ALung, and Prodiogo Solutions.

== Facilities ==
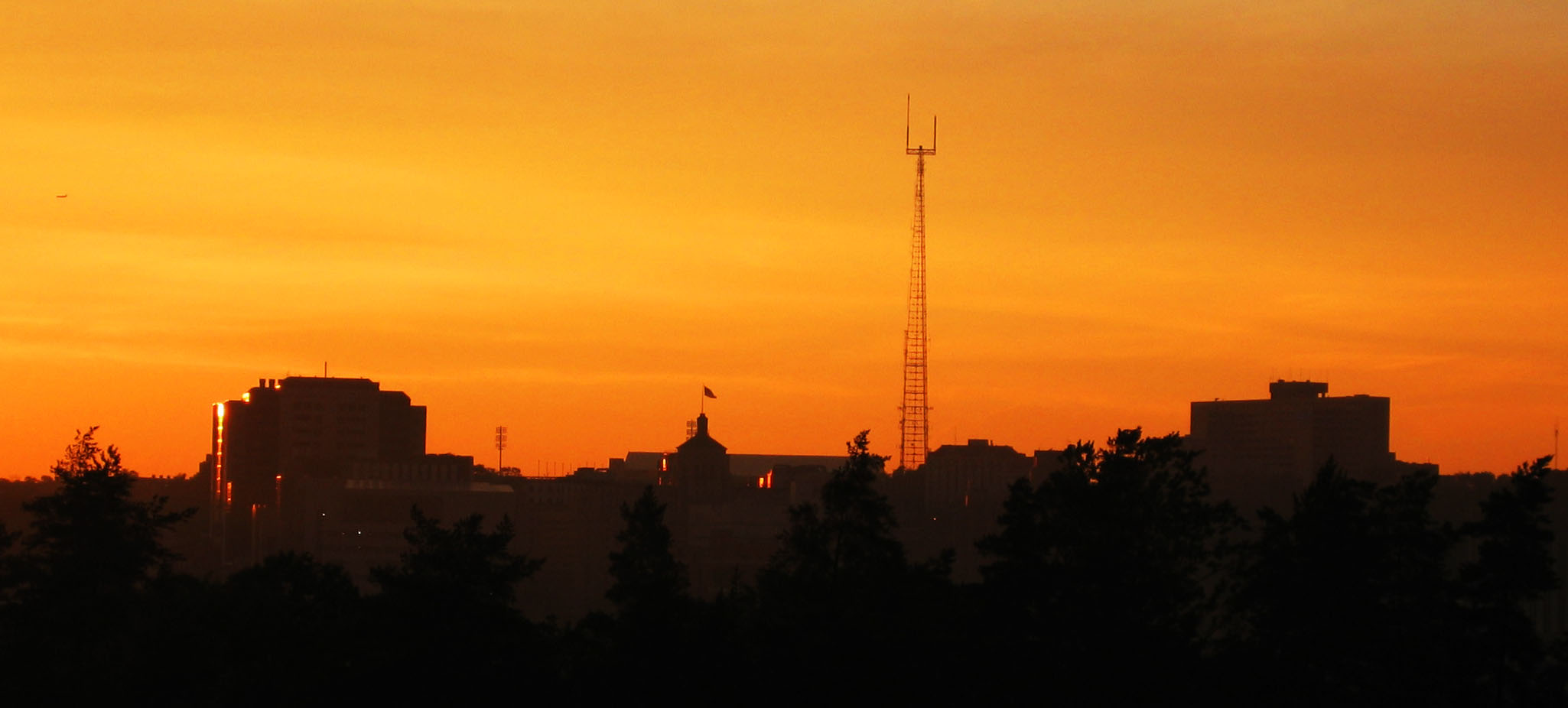
Sunset over UPMC's facilities in Pittsburgh's Oakland neighborhood, which is the location of the flagship facilities of Presbyterian, Montefiore, Western Psychiatric, and Magee-Womens hospitals as well as the home to the University of Pittsburgh School of Medicine and other affiliated Pitt schools of the health sciences

UPMC currently operates 40 academic, community, and specialty hospitals with more than 8,000 licensed beds, 600 clinical locations including outpatient sites and doctors' offices, and outpatient sites; over 50 cancer center locations; more than 70 facilities for physical, occupational, speech and specialty therapies; and 20 retirement and long-term care sites.

=== Flagship facility ===
UPMC Presbyterian Shadyside is UPMC's primary flagship medical entity and represents the core of UPMC's academic, teaching, trauma, specialty and research-related facilities, serving as the system's primary academic hub and Pennsylvania's largest inpatient acute care hospital.

UPMC Presbyterian Shadyside includes UPMC Presbyterian hospital and the physically conjoined UPMC Eye & Ear and UPMC Montefiore hospitals as well as the UPMC Western Psychiatric Hospital that also serves as the University of Pittsburgh's Thomas Detre Hall. These facilities are all located on the western side of the University of Pittsburgh's main campus in the Oakland neighborhood of Pittsburgh. The hospitals are also physically connected to the University of Pittsburgh School of Medicine's Scaife Hall, the University of Pittsburgh School of Nursing's Victoria Hall, Falk Clinic, three of the university's biomedical science towers, and the university's Lothrop Hall dormitory, all of which are surrounded by a variety of other academic facilities.

UPMC Presbyterian Shadyside also encompasses the UPMC Shadyside hospital campus which includes the University of Pittsburgh Cancer Institute in the UPMC Hillman Cancer Center which are located near the university's Centre Plaza Apartments student housing. The UPMC Shadyside facilities are located in the adjacent neighborhood of Shadyside approximately 1.5 miles (2.4 km) from the Oakland-based hospitals and are connected by regular shuttle service.

Also operating under UPMC Presbyterian Shadyside is the UPMC Rooney Sports Complex, located less than 2 miles (3.2 km) from the Oakland-based facilities on Pittsburgh's South Side.

The facilities combine to include over 1,600 beds, making it the fourth-largest hospital in the United States.

==== UPMC Presbyterian campus ====
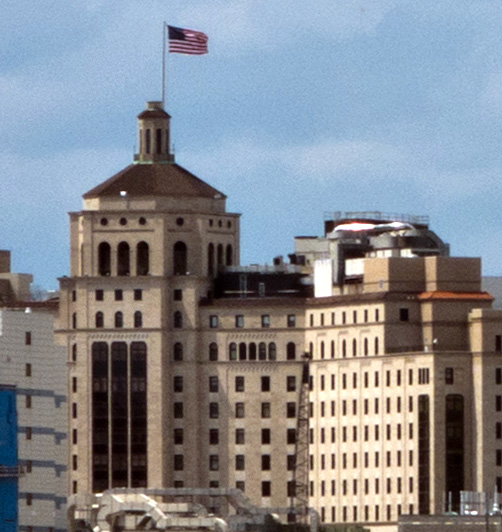
UPMC's flagship facility, UPMC Presbyterian

===== UPMC Presbyterian =====
UPMC Presbyterian is the historic and academic center of UPMC and is physically attached to the primary facility of the University of Pittsburgh School of Medicine, Scaife Hall. Located in Oakland, the hospital has 792 beds and includes a Level I Trauma Center. Listed among Becker's Hospital Review 50 Best Hospitals in America, UPMC Presbyterian's specialties include organ transplantation, cardiology, trauma, gastroenterology, and neurosurgery. The School of Medicine uses UPMC Presbyterian for research and graduate programs.

===== UPMC Montefiore =====
UPMC Montefiore, part of UPMC Presbyterian, was founded as Montefiore Hospital in 1908 by the Ladies Hospital Aid Society as a hospital for Jewish physicians and patients. Montefiore Hospital affiliated with the University of Pittsburgh School of Medicine in 1957 and joined UPMC in 1990. It is the home to the clinical transplantation facilities originally headed by transplant pioneer Thomas Starzl and is physically connected to UPMC Presbyterian and UPMC Eye and Ear by a series of pedestrian bridges.

===== UPMC Eye & Ear Institute =====
UPMC Eye & Ear Institute is located in the Oakland neighborhood of Pittsburgh and is conjoined with the medical complex housing UPMC Presbyterian, UPMC Montefiore, the University of Pittsburgh School of Medicine, and associated medical research towers. UPMC Ear & Eye Institute is one of a few centers in the nation dedicated entirely to the management of problems related to otolaryngology and ophthalmology.

===== Clinical Laboratory Building =====
UPMC's nine-story Clinical Laboratory Building (CLB) opened in 2013 and cost $39 million. The CLB is located in the Oakland neighborhood and is situated between Magee-Womens Hospital and UPMC Presbyterian Hospital. Much of UPMC's laboratory testing is performed within the CLB. An extensive pneumatic tube system connects the CLB with UPMC hospitals that are in the Oakland neighborhood (Presbyterian, Magee-Womens, Montefiore) to facilitate the transport of specimens from the hospitals to the laboratories.

==== UPMC Shadyside campus ====
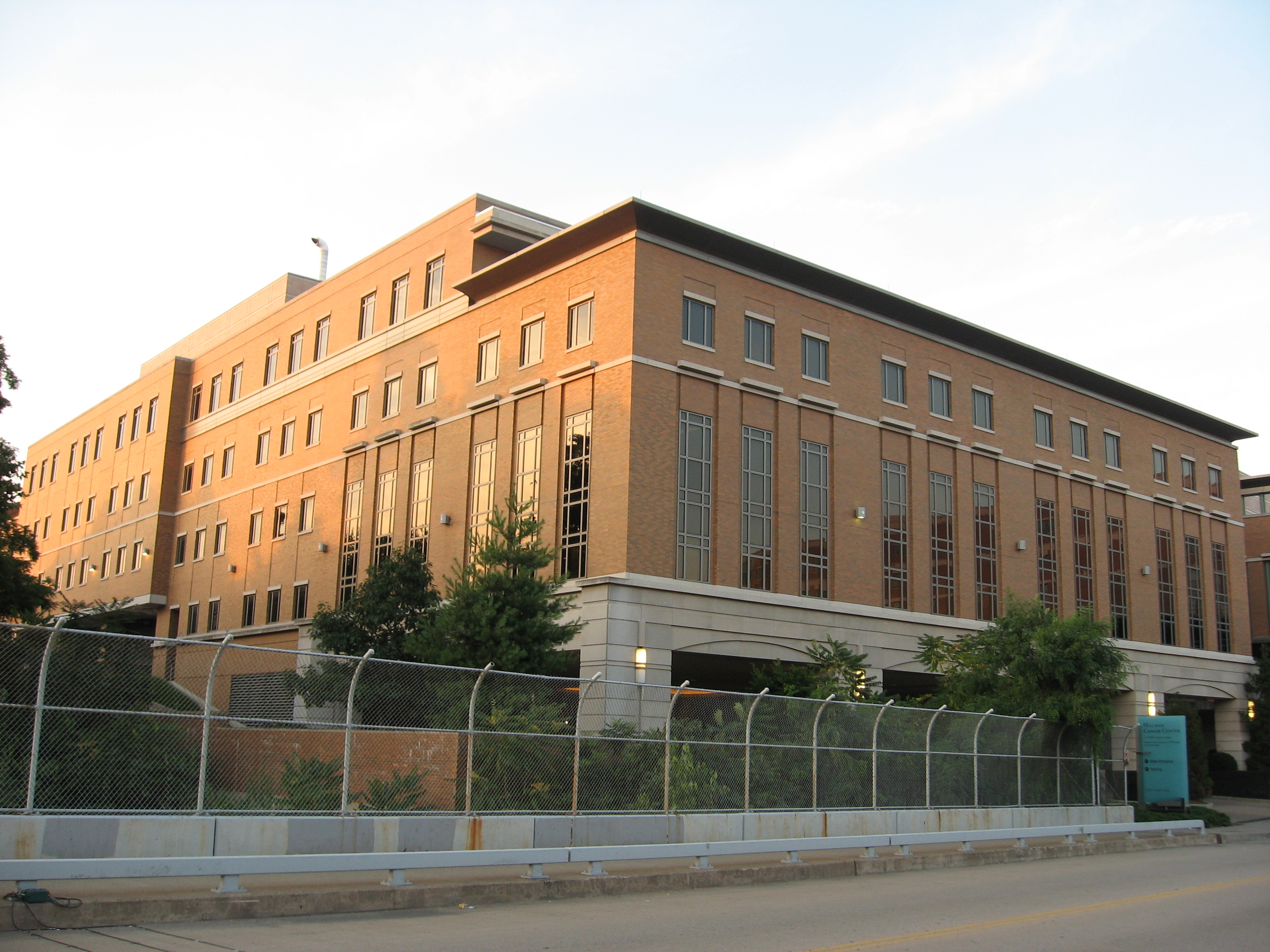
The Hillman Cancer Center, part of UPMC Shadyside, is home to the NCI-designated University of Pittsburgh Cancer Institute

===== UPMC Shadyside =====
UPMC Shadyside is a nationally ranked, 520-bed non-profit, tertiary, teaching hospital located in the Shadyside neighborhood of Pittsburgh, Pennsylvania. UPMC Shadyside is a part of the University of Pittsburgh Medical Center (UPMC), and grouped in with the flagship UPMC Presbyterian. The hospital is near UPMC's flagship campus which houses Presbyterian and Montefiore. As the hospital is a teaching hospital, it is affiliated with University of Pittsburgh School of Medicine. The hospital has an emergency room to handle emergencies, with a rooftop helipad to transport critical patients to and from the hospital. UPMC Shadyside houses the flagship campus of the UPMC Hillman Cancer Center, a nationally ranked cancer hospital.

UPMC Shadyside is part of UPMC's flagship medical entity and is located in Pittsburgh's Shadyside neighborhood, with 520 beds and nearly 1,000 primary care physicians. Founded in as the Pittsburgh Homeopathic Hospital, it changed its name to that of the neighborhood of Shadyside on May 12, 1938. Shadyside agreed to be bought by UPMC on June 5, 1996. UPMC Shadyside is home to the Hillman Cancer Center, home of the University of Pittsburgh Cancer Institute.

===== UPMC Hillman Cancer Center =====
The UPMC Hillman Cancer Center, formerly titled the University of Pittsburgh Cancer Institute, is a National Cancer Institute designated cancer center and the flagship of the UPMC Cancer Centers network. Founded in 1985 at the University of Pittsburgh, the center is located in the Shadyside neighborhood of Pittsburgh and is connected to UPMC Shadyside via a pedestrian bridge.

==== UPMC sports medicine complexes ====
UPMC has two major facilities which are contained UPMC Presbyterian Shadyside's sports medicine operations.

===== UPMC Rooney Sports Complex =====
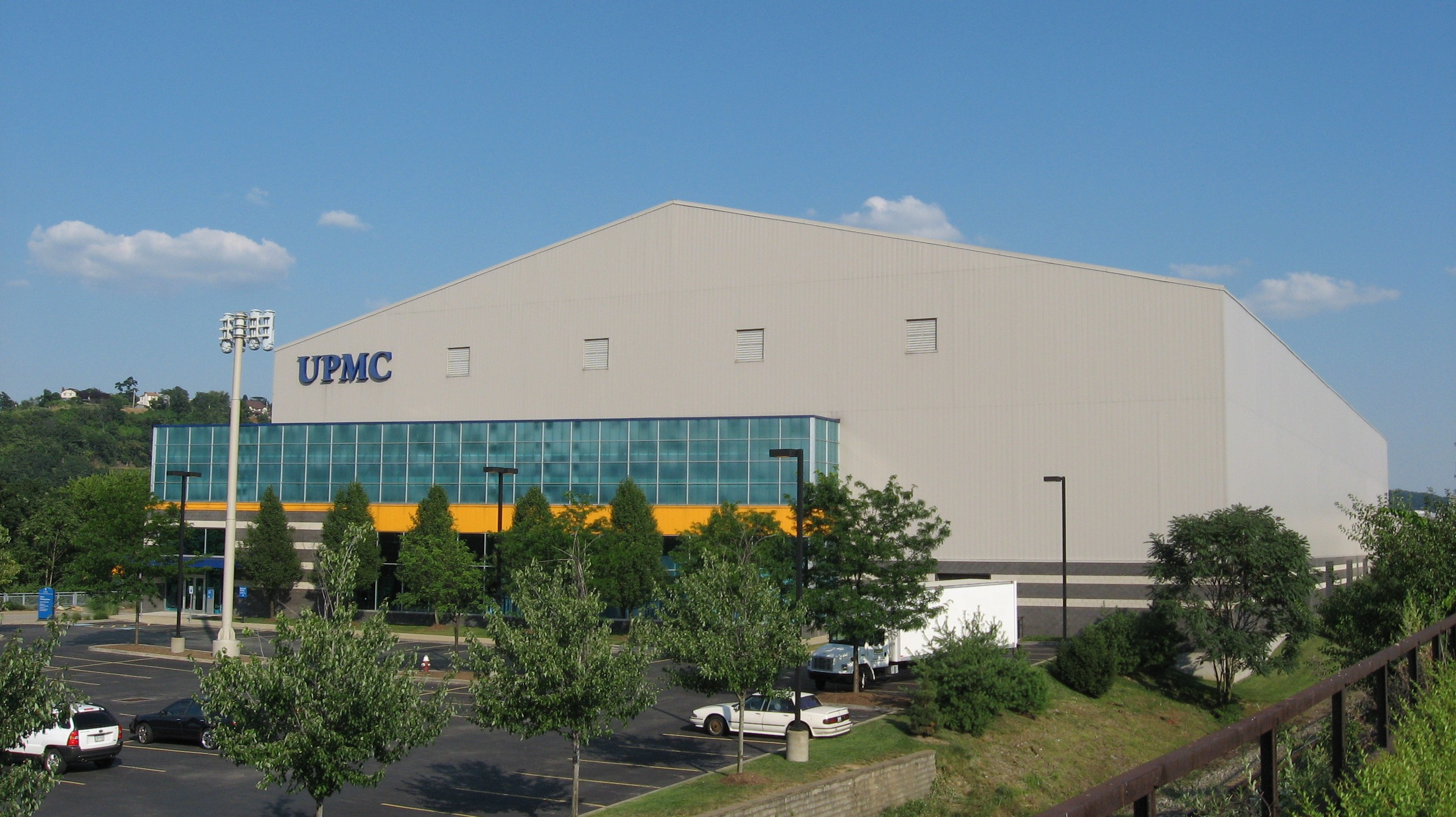
The UPMC Rooney Sports Complex on the Southside of Pittsburgh

The UPMC Rooney Sports Complex is a multipurpose, multisport training, sports science, and sports medical complex located along the shore of the Monongahela River in Pittsburgh and is unique in that it combines training facilities for the University of Pittsburgh football team and the Pittsburgh Steelers NFL team in one location with an academically based sports science and medicine program. The complex consists of four centers which include the Center for Sports Medicine, Sports Training Center, Indoor Training Center, and the Fitness and Conditioning Center.

===== UPMC Lemieux Sports Complex =====
The UPMC Lemieux Sports Complex, opened in 2015 in Cranberry Township, is a 185,000 square feet (17,200 m^{2}) contains both a comprehensive outpatient facility for UPMC Sports Medicine and the primary training facilities for the NHL's Pittsburgh Penguins, and the secondary venue for their ECHL affiliate, the Wheeling Nailers. The outpatient clinic includes orthopedic, primary care, physical therapy, concussion, imaging, and sports performance services. The training facility includes two-full-sized ice rinks, training and locker rooms, video review facility, and executive offices.

=== Major Specialty Hospitals ===
==== UPMC Children's Hospital of Pittsburgh ====
UPMC Children's Hospital of Pittsburgh, (CHP), popularly known simply as "Children's", is part of the University of Pittsburgh Medical Center, and the only hospital in Southwestern Pennsylvania dedicated solely to the care of infants, children, teens and young adults well into their 20s and beyond, generally stopping around age 26. UPMC Children's also sometimes even treats older adults that require pediatric care. Care is provided by more than 700 board-certified pediatricians and pediatric specialists. Children's also provides primary care and specialty care at over 30 locations throughout the Pittsburgh region, as well as clinical specialty services throughout western Pennsylvania at regional health care facilities. UPMC Children's Hospital of Pittsburgh was one of only eight pediatric hospitals in the United States to make U.S. News & World Report's 2010-11 Best Children's Hospitals Honor Roll and is ranked in all ten of the specialties evaluated by US News. Children's is also one of only eight children's hospitals in the United States to be named as a Leapfrog Top Hospital and was ranked sixth in the nation by Parents magazine.

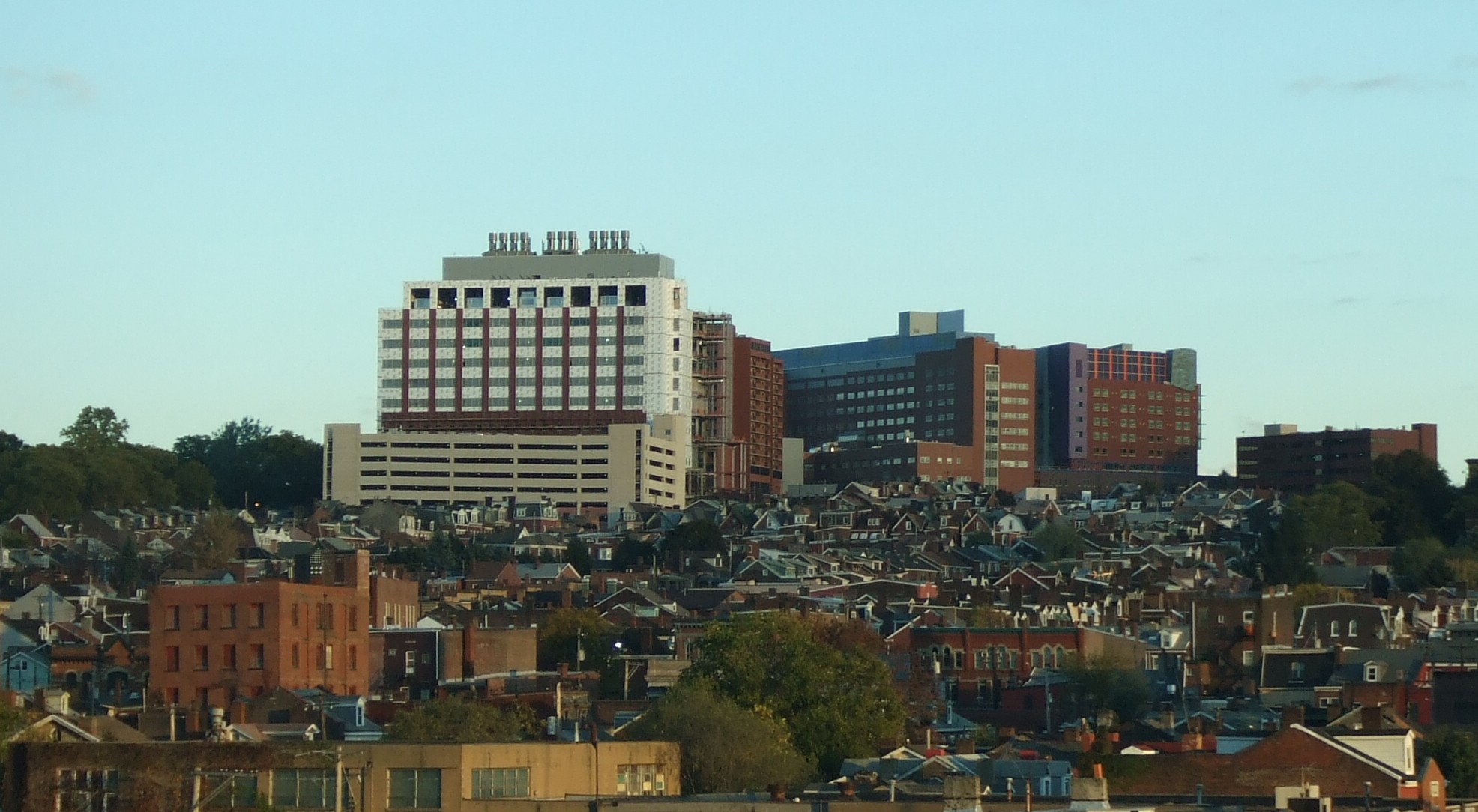
The new facility for UPMC Children's Hospital of Pittsburgh opened May 2, 2009

UPMC Children's Hospital of Pittsburgh is a specialty hospital of UPMC, specializing in pediatrics and is located two and a half miles from UPMC Presbyterian in the Lawrenceville neighborhood of Pittsburgh. Serving as UPMC's primary pediatrics facility, it was originally located adjacent to UPMC Presbyterian in Oakland. Children's is one of four children's hospitals in the state, and its emergency department is one of only two Level I Pediatric Trauma Centers. The Emergency Department at UPMC Children’s Hospital of Pittsburgh treats more than 80,000 patients a year. More than 500,000 infants, children, and adolescents make trips to the hospital every year. Children's ranks in nine of the 10 pediatric subspecialties in the prestigious U.S. News & World Report annual Honor Roll of America's Best Children's Hospitals for 2018–2019.

UPMC Children's Hospital of Pittsburgh boasts 1,500,000 square feet (140,000 m^{2}) and has 315 beds, with a 46-bed emergency department and a 36-bed pediatric intensive care unit. A ten-story research center was constructed, with seven out of the ten floors dedicated to pediatric medical research.

==== UPMC Magee-Womens Hospital ====
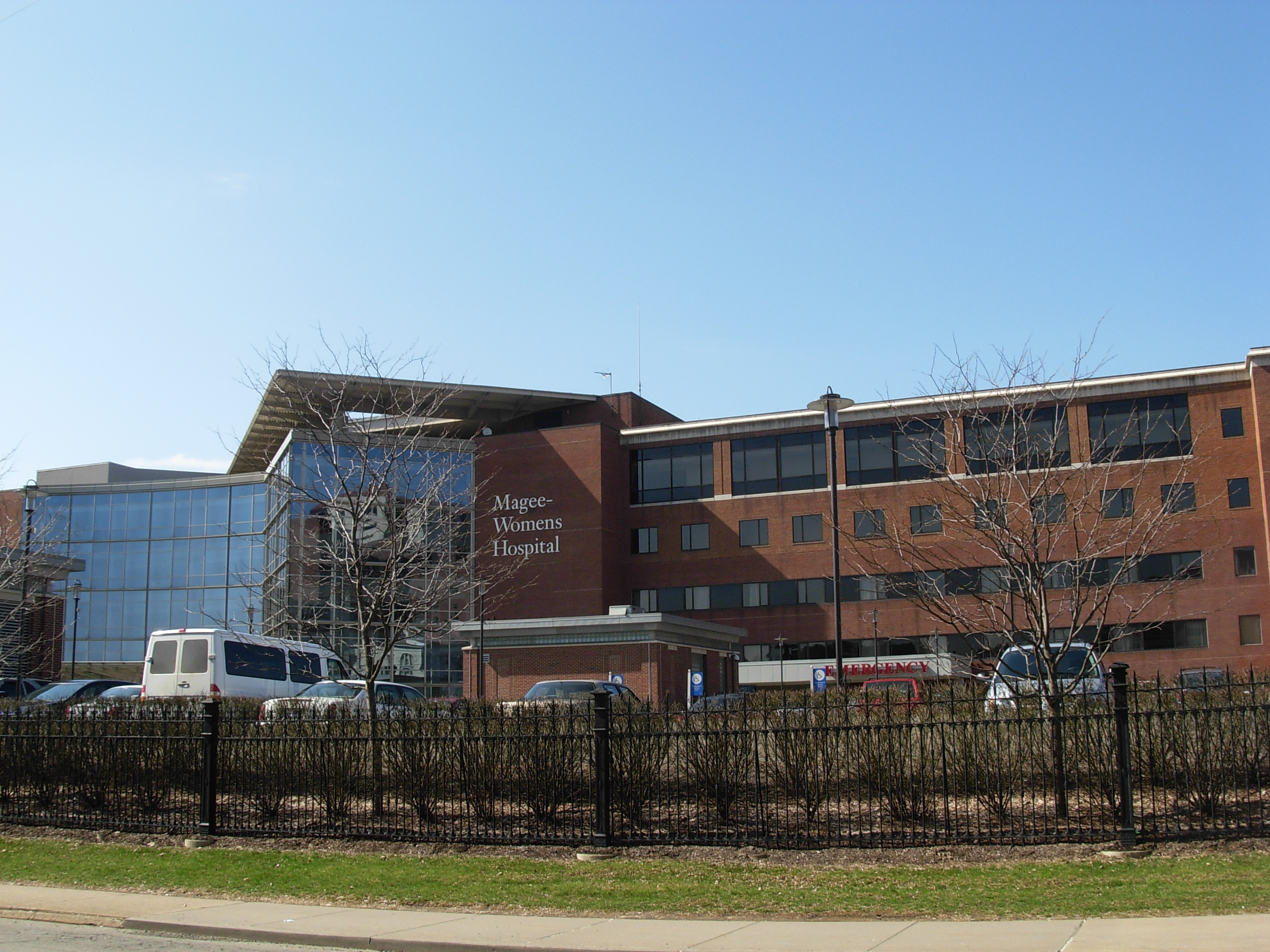
UPMC Magee-Womens Hospital

UPMC Magee-Womens Hospital is a UPMC specialty hospital that serves as its primary facility for women's health. Opened mainly for women on January 19, 1911, it has offered some services for men since the 1960s. The hospital is located in the Oakland neighborhood of Pittsburgh near UPMC Presbyterian, a location it has been at since its fourth year in 1915. The hospital merged with UPMC in 1999. It currently is equipped with 360 beds, an emergency room and ambulatory facilities on four floors which allows it to offer all possible services under one roof including family medicine physicians, gastroenterologists, dermatologists, rheumatologists, pulmonary specialists, orthopedists, urologists and neurologists. Magee-Womens has a staff of 2,500, of which 1,500 are medically licensed. It also operates a satellite hospital in the city's northern suburbs as part of the UPMC Passavant facility as well as 9 metro area imaging clinics. In 2011 the hospital undertook an expansion of its main facility which was completed in June 2012. The expansion added six floors, increased the number of beds from 318 to 360 (including 14 additional intensive care rooms), and expanded the surgical and ambulatory facilities. 10,000 births are performed at Magee each year, which accounts for 45 percent of all births in Allegheny County. The hospital is built on the grounds of the home of legendary Pittsburgh political boss Christopher Magee and named in honor of his mother, Elizabeth Steel Magee.

==== UPMC Western Psychiatric Hospital ====
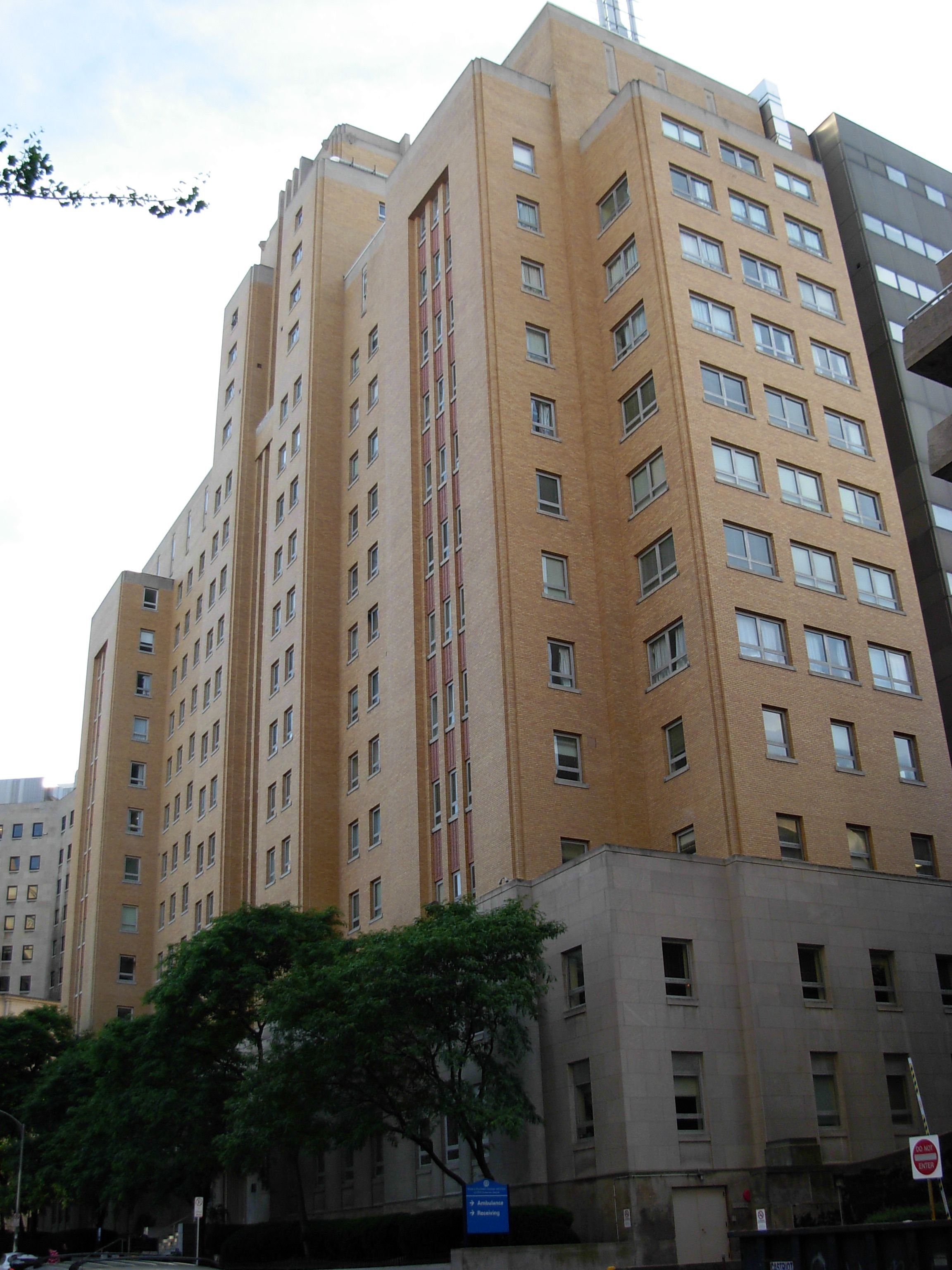
Western Psychiatric Hospital's Thomas Detre Hall on the campus of University of Pittsburgh in Oakland

UPMC Western Psychiatric Hospital is one of the nation's largest university-affiliated psychiatric hospitals and serves as UPMC's primary psychiatric facility.

Located adjacent to UPMC Presbyterian Hospital in Thomas Detre Hall on O'Hara Street in the Oakland section of Pittsburgh, and connected to UPMC Presbyterian Hospital by a tunnel, Western Psychiatric houses the University of Pittsburgh School of Medicine's Department of Psychiatry and serves as a main teaching hospital for psychiatry, psychology, and social work trainees. With nearly 400 inpatient psychiatric beds and more than 50 ambulatory programs, it is one of the largest behavioral health care providers affiliated with an academic medical center in the country.

A fatal shooting incident occurred at Western Psychiatric's Thomas Detre Hall on March 8, 2012. 30-year-old John Shick, a Carleton College alumnus and former Duquesne University biology graduate student, entered the building at 1:42 p.m. with two semiautomatic handguns and shot six people in the first-floor lobby. Michael Schaab, 25, a Western Psychiatric therapist, was killed. University of Pittsburgh police arrived just after 2 p.m. and engaged Shick in a gun battle, eventually killing him. Seven people, including Pitt police officers, were injured and two, including the shooter, were killed during the incident. Shick was reported to have a history of mental illness and had behaved erratically in the weeks before the shooting. Handwritten messages complaining about his medical treatment and the evils of "corporate America," floor plans and blueprints of Thomas Detre Hall, and supplies for making Molotov cocktails were found in his apartment after the shooting.

==== Future specialty hospitals ====
In 2018, UPMC announced it would be constructing 3 additional specialty hospitals in Pittsburgh: a vision hospital set to open adjacent to UPMC Mercy, a 180-bed cancer hospital set to open adjacent to UPMC Shadyside, and a 620-bed heart and transplant specialty hospital set to open adjacent to UPMC Presbyterian. The UPMC Vision Institute opened in the 9-story UPMC Mercy Pavilion in April 2023. A 17-story specialty medicine tower adjacent to UPMC Presbyterian broke ground in June 2022 and is targeted to open in 2026.

=== Tertiary hospitals ===
The following tertiary hospitals are major full-service, referral hospitals of the UPMC system.

==== UPMC Mercy ====
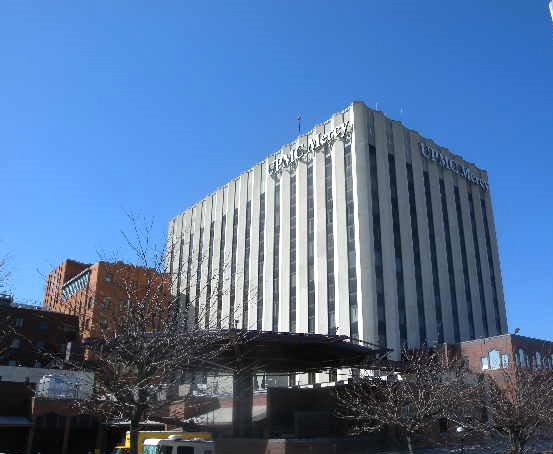
UPMC Mercy

UPMC Mercy is a 495-bed teaching and Level 1 trauma hospital located in the Bluff neighborhood adjacent to downtown and less than two miles (3 km) from UPMC Presbyterian in Oakland. Mercy was the first chartered hospital in the city of Pittsburgh and was the first hospital in the world to have been established by the Sisters of Mercy. Mercy has retained its affiliation with the Catholic Church following its merger with UPMC in January 2008.

===== UPMC Mercy South Side Outpatient Center =====
The UPMC Mercy South Side Outpatient Center, formerly UPMC South Side hospital, is a 209,000-square-foot (19,400 m^{2}) urgent care and outpatient facility serving the South Side neighborhood of Pittsburgh. It is one of several UPMC outpatient medical facilities serving various communities throughout the region.

==== UPMC Altoona ====
UPMC Altoona, located in Altoona, Pennsylvania, is a 361-bed, non-profit, private community hospital system that contains more than 20 affiliated health care companies and functions as the regional referral center and tertiary hub of UPMC in west central Pennsylvania.

==== UPMC Hamot ====
UPMC Hamot is 423-bed, tertiary care teaching medical center with a Level II trauma center located in Erie, Pennsylvania. Hamot offers primary medical care and the full complement of medical specialties. The hospital was founded in 1881 and officially became part of UPMC in 2011.

===== Magee-Womens Hospital - UPMC Hamot Campus =====
UPMC Hamot Women's Hospital is a five-story, 165,000 square-foot, 93-bed stand-alone hospital that opened in 2011. The hospital houses obstetrics, neonatology, and gynecology specialities of UPMC Hamot and includes a Level III neonatal intensive care unit. As of October 2013, it also houses the Pediatrics wing of UPMC Hamot.

===== UPMC Kane =====
UPMC Kane, formerly known as Kane Community Hospital, is a 31-bed acute care hospital located in Kane, Pennsylvania, that became an affiliate of UPMC Hamot in November 2009. UPMC Kane was fully integrated into the UPMC network on April 1, 2017, and functions as a direct subsidiary of UPMC Hamot.

==== UPMC Passavant ====
UPMC Passavant is UPMC's tertiary care hospital of Pittsburgh's northern suburbs that consists of two campuses, one in McCandless and another in Cranberry Township with a combined 423 beds. Founded by Lutherans in 1849, Passavant was the first Protestant hospital built in the United States. In 1964, Passavant moved from the City of Pittsburgh to its location in McCandless to serve the communities of northern Allegheny and southern Butler counties. Passavant merged with UPMC in 1997 and in 2002, as part of UPMC's acquisition of St. Francis Medical Center for the conversion of its flagship facility into the new Children's Hospital of Pittsburgh, UPMC converted St. Francis' hospital in Cranberry into a satellite campus of UPMC Passavant. In 2010, a seven-story 188,000 square foot patient pavilion was opened on the McCandless campus bringing total beds there to 399.

==== UPMC Harrisburg ====
UPMC Harrisburg is a 409-bed urban, teaching hospital in Harrisburg, Pennsylvania, serving as the primary referral hospital for the UPMC Central PA system which comprises seven hospitals and additional clinics serving south central and southeastern Pennsylvania.

==== UPMC Susquehanna Williamsport ====
UPMC Susquehanna Williamsport is a 224-bed tertiary hospital in Williamsport, Pennsylvania, serving as the primary referral hospital of the six hospital UPMC Susquehanna system serving north central Pennsylvania.

=== Acute care/community hospitals ===
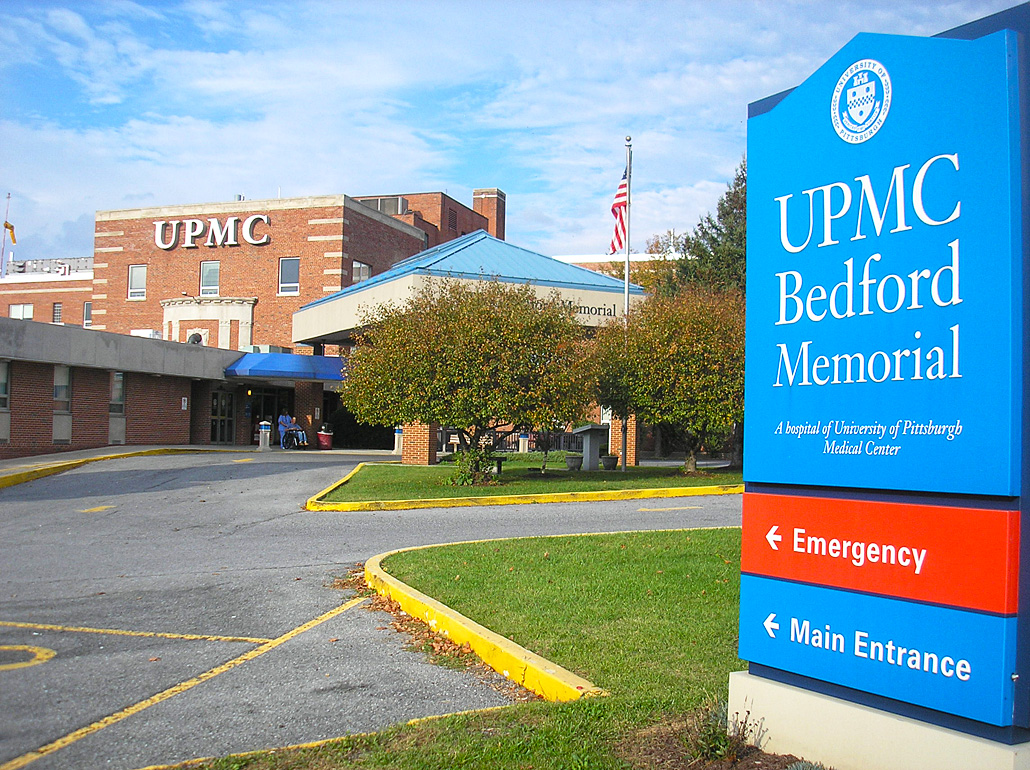
UPMC Bedford

UPMC operates the following acute care community hospitals dedicated to specific missions within their particular communities.

- UPMC Bedford, located in Everett, Pennsylvania.
- UPMC Chautauqua, located in Jamestown, New York, is a 317-bed hospital that was originally charted in 1885. It is the only domestic hospital located outside of Pennsylvania to become part of the UPMC system.
- UPMC East, a $250 million full-service, 155-bed hospital that opened in Monroeville, Pennsylvania, in July 2012.
- UPMC Horizon, which consists of the Greenville and Shenango Valley campuses.
- UPMC Jameson, located in New Castle, Pennsylvania.
- UPMC McKeesport, located in McKeesport, Pennsylvania.
- UPMC Northwest, located in Seneca, Pennsylvania.
- UPMC St. Margaret, a 248-bed acute care and teaching hospital in the northeast corner of Pittsburgh, near Aspinwall, PA, serving the residents of northeastern Allegheny County and the Alle-Kiski Valley.
- UPMC Central Pa which comprises seven hospitals, including its tertiary flagship UPMC Harrisburg, serves South Central Pennsylvania, operates the following seven community hospitals:
  - UPMC Carlisle located in Carlisle, Pennsylvania
  - UPMC Hanover located in Hanover, Pennsylvania
  - UPMC Lititz located in Lititz, Pennsylvania
  - UPMC Memorial located in York, Pennsylvania has 104 beds, five stories, and opened in 2019.
  - UPMC Community Osteopathic located in Harrisburg, Pennsylvania
  - UPMC West Shore located in Mechanicsburg, Pennsylvania
- UPMC Somerset, a 111-bed, general acute care community hospital located in Somerset, Pennsylvania
- UPMC Susquehanna which comprises five hospitals, including its tertiary flagship UPMC Williamsport, operates the additional four community hospitals in north central Pennsylvania and one outpatient emergency center:
  - UPMC Cole located in Coudersport, Pennsylvania. It has 25 beds and its labor and delivery unit is scheduled to close in April 2025.
  - UPMC Lock Haven (outpatient emergency center) located in Lock Haven, Pennsylvania
  - UPMC Muncy located in Muncy, Pennsylvania
  - UPMC Wellsboro located in Wellsboro, Pennsylvania
  - UPMC Williamsport Divine Providence Campus located in Williamsport, Pennsylvania
- UPMC Washington, a 244-bed hospital located in Washington, Pennsylvania
  - UPMC Greene, a 23-bed hospital of the former Washington Health System located in Waynesburg, Pennsylvania
- UPMC Western Maryland, a 200-bed hospital located in Cumberland, Maryland

=== International hospitals and facilities ===
Internationally, UPMC operates a transplant hospital in Italy (ISMETT), two hospitals and two cancer centers in Ireland, a cancer center in Rome and previously helped to establish an emergency medical system in Qatar. UPMC also implemented information technology solutions and assisting with the development of cancer centers in the United Kingdom, is providing consultation services and developing a network of co-managed hospitals in China, and, with the University of Pittsburgh School of Medicine, implemented a U.S.-style resident training program in Japan. UPMC is also a partner with the University of Pittsburgh and the governments of Italy and the region of Sicily in Fondazione Ri.Med, which is building a €210 million Biomedical Research and Biotechnology Center in Carini near Palermo. In June 2019, UPMC signed a deal with the Wanda Group to develop and operate five private hospitals in major Chinese cities. The first hospital, the Chengdu Wanda-UPMC International Hospital, is expected to open in 2022.

==== ISMETT ====
The Mediterranean Institute for Transplantation and Advanced Specialized Therapies (Istituto Mediterraneo per i Trapianti e Terapie ad Alta Specializzazione, or ISMETT) is located in Palermo, Italy, and serves the region of Sicily and the Mediterranean as a hospital designed exclusively for transplants and treatment of end-stage organ failure. ISMETT is a joint public-private partnership between the Region of Sicily, through Civico and Cervello hospitals in Palermo, and UPMC, which manages and operates the facility. It is also a center for research in regenerative medicine and various international collaborations including the University of Pittsburgh's and UPMC's McGowan Institute for Regenerative Medicine.

==== UPMC Kildare ====
UPMC Kildare Hospital is a 39-bed private hospital located in County Kildare, Ireland (founded in 1985 as Clane General Hospital). UPMC acquired the hospital in November 2019 in partnership with the Institute of Eye Surgery.

==== UPMC Whitfield ====
UPMC Whitfield is an 80-bed private hospital located in Waterford, Ireland. UPMC, which had operated a cancer center at the hospital since 2006, acquired the hospital on May 24, 2018.

==== UPMC Salvator Mundi ====
UPMC Salvator Mundi International Hospital 75-bed private hospital in Rome, Italy, that is jointly owned by UPMC and Rome International Hospital Management Srl. UPMC owns a 50% stake in the hospital and leads its medical operations including having responsibility for selecting its medical director and chief operating officer.

=== Former hospitals ===
Former UPMC hospitals include UPMC Sunbury in Sunbury, Pennsylvania (2017–2020) which was closed and services integrated into other nearby facilities; UPMC Beacon Hospital in Dublin, Ireland (2009 to 2014) which was acquired by Irish businessman Denis O'Brien; UPMC Braddock in Braddock, Pennsylvania (1996 to 2010) which was closed; UPMC South Side hospital in Pittsburgh (1996 to 2009) which was merged with UPMC Mercy and converted into UPMC Mercy South Side Outpatient Center; UPMC Lee Regional in Johnstown, Pennsylvania (1998 to 2005) which was sold to Conemaugh Health System; and UPMC Beaver Valley in Aliquippa, Pennsylvania (1996 to 2001) which was transferred back to its community board and subsequently closed. UPMC Pinnacle Lancaster, formerly St. Joseph's hospital in Lancaster, Pennsylvania, closed on February 28, 2019, and its services were consolidated into UPMC Pinnacle Lititz.

== Community engagement ==
UPMC has committed to several community projects, most notably pledging $100 million to the Pittsburgh Promise, a scholarship program to help students graduating from the Pittsburgh Public Schools pursue post-secondary education, and $525 million for construction of a new Children's Hospital. In fiscal year 2012, UPMC donated a combined $622 million in charitable community benefits. This included $96 million in community health programs and charitable donations to help stage more than 3,000 community health improvement programs, $288 million in support for research and education, and $238 million for charity care and unreimbursed health care, not including an additional $146 million to cover Medicare reimbursement shortfalls. Despite its 60% market share, UPMC accounted for 78% of the care in Allegheny County's low income communities and 88% of the care for children living in poverty. UPMC contributed $887 million, or more than 15 percent of its net patient revenue, to community services in Fiscal Year 2013, and provides more care to the most underserved areas than any other health care institution in the region.

=== Center for Biosecurity at UPMC ===
The Center for Biosecurity at UPMC (CBUPMC) is led by Thomas V. Inglesby, MD. Their mandate is to conduct "independent research, analysis, and nonpartisan policy recommendations" to serve as "resources for decision makers who are responsible for strengthening US planning, response, and resilience to catastrophic events."

== Criticism and controversies ==
UPMC has been criticized for excessive profits, monopolistic practices, excessive advertising budgets, and focusing on overseas operations at the expense of domestic ones. In addition, various controversies have received significant local and national attention in recent years. Over the last decade, it has often found itself the target of pointed criticisms from SEIU Healthcare, which has tried unsuccessfully to organize bargaining units among UPMC's service employees and other front-line workers.

In 2008, the administration and reporting of UPMC's living donor liver transplantation program received national attention when internal studies, spearheaded by transplant pioneer Thomas Starzl, questioned the safety of the procedure and ultimately resulted in the forced resignation of liver transplant program head, Amadeo Marcos. Another controversy arose in May 2011 for UPMC's live-donor kidney transplant program when a kidney infected with hepatitis C was transplanted into a non-infected person. The incident led UPMC to voluntarily shut down its kidney transplant program for two months, and resulted in the suspension of a nurse and demotion of a surgeon. Federal reviewers with United Network for Organ Sharing concluded human error at fault for the oversight and corrective plans that included multiple redundancies were instituted with oversight from the Pennsylvania Department of Health. Because of the botched living donor kidney transplant at UPMC, the federal Organ Procurement Transplant Network (OPTN) put UPMC's transplant program on probation, a rarely used form of discipline handed down for some of the most serious transplant errors. The OPTN said it meted out the discipline not only because of the kidney transplant error, but because UPMC's transplant program was found to have problems in its communication and documentation procedures before.

In April 2009, rival West Penn Allegheny Health System filed an antitrust lawsuit against the UPMC and health insurer Highmark, claiming a conspiracy to create a monopoly. The lawsuit was later dismissed with prejudice. West Penn Allegheny filed an appeal of this judgment. Upon appeal, the case was unanimously reinstated by the US Third Circuit Court of Appeals.

In October 2009, UPMC's administration decision to close UPMC Braddock hospital resulted in multiple protest and lawsuits by community groups who disputed UPMC's claims that the hospital was losing money and was underutilized. The facility, now demolished in preparation for redevelopment, closed in January 2010.

In April 2013, UPMC has been criticized for paying low wages, and using unfair labor practices to thwart efforts by employees to unionize, as alleged in the Service Employees International Union's complaint to the National Labor Relations Board. In addition, critics have accused the system of using noncompete agreements, preventing workers from mobilizing, and suppressing wages.

In March 2013, the City of Pittsburgh filed a lawsuit in Federal court challenging the tax exempt status of UPMC as a public charity, in an effort to make UPMC to pay back taxes. The city alleged that UPMC has abused its status to avoid paying property taxes. The city dropped its lawsuit in 2014.

In February 2019, the Pennsylvania Attorney General submitted legal actions against UPMC to enforce requirements for open health care access based on the non-profit status of UPMC. These actions stem from a long-standing dispute between Highmark Health and UPMC, the largest two health-care providers in Western PA. In 2011, Highmark entered a partnership with West Penn Hospital System (now Allegheny Health Network). Because of this competitive threat, UPMC declared they would not accept Highmark Blue Cross Blue Shield Insurance. In order to protect public access to health care while agreements between the two systems unwound, both UPMC and Highmark Health accepted a state-brokered consent decree. With the consent decree expiring in 2019, the Pennsylvania Attorney General attempted to negotiate continued access to care with both companies. Highmark indicated that it would accept the terms while UPMC did not. It is the failure to accept the proposal that the PA Attorney General cited as leading to the legal actions of February 2019. UPMC then counter sued the Attorney General in federal court claiming his actions were "anti-competitive" and violate federal regulations and due process rights, while accusing him of "intervening in a high-profile matter solely to advance his own political goals." In June 2019, UPMC and Highmark reached a deal for a 10-year contract to maintain access across both health systems and all lawsuits that had been brought by the Attorney General, UPMC, and Highmark were subsequently dropped.

In 2021, the U.S. Attorney's Office filed a lawsuit against UPMC, University of Pittsburgh Physicians, and one of UPMC's top surgeons, alleging the surgeon was "regularly scheduling multiple complex surgeries at the same time, forcing him to move between operating rooms and sometimes hospitals, while requiring patients to stay under additional hours of anesthesia." In February 2023, UPMC agreed to pay the federal government $8.5 million to settle a lawsuit accusing them of "knowingly submitting hundreds of false claims to Medicare, failing to follow medical standards for surgery and knowingly placing patients at risk."

UPMC announced the closure of the labor and delivery unit at UPMC Cole in 2025, leading to protests from community members. Seven counties would be in a maternity care desert.

== In popular culture ==
The television medical dramas Heartland (2007) and Three Rivers (2009) were largely based on UPMC and the University of Pittsburgh's Thomas E. Starzl Transplantation Institute. In both cases the hospitals are fictionalized, but in the latter series UPMC is also specifically referred to as another Pittsburgh-area hospital.

== Gallery ==
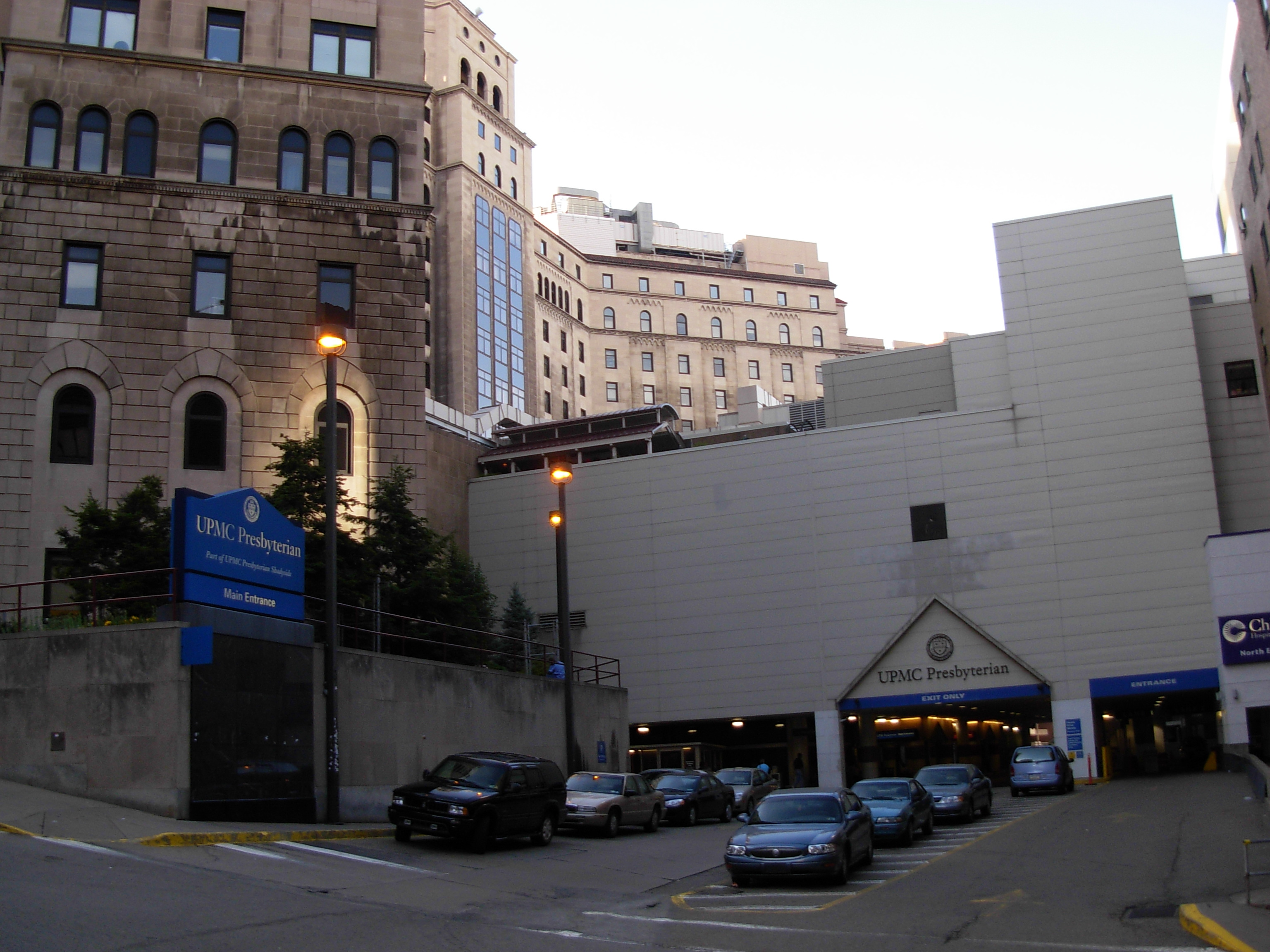
Entrance to UPMC's co-flagship hospital in Oakland: UPMC Presbyterian

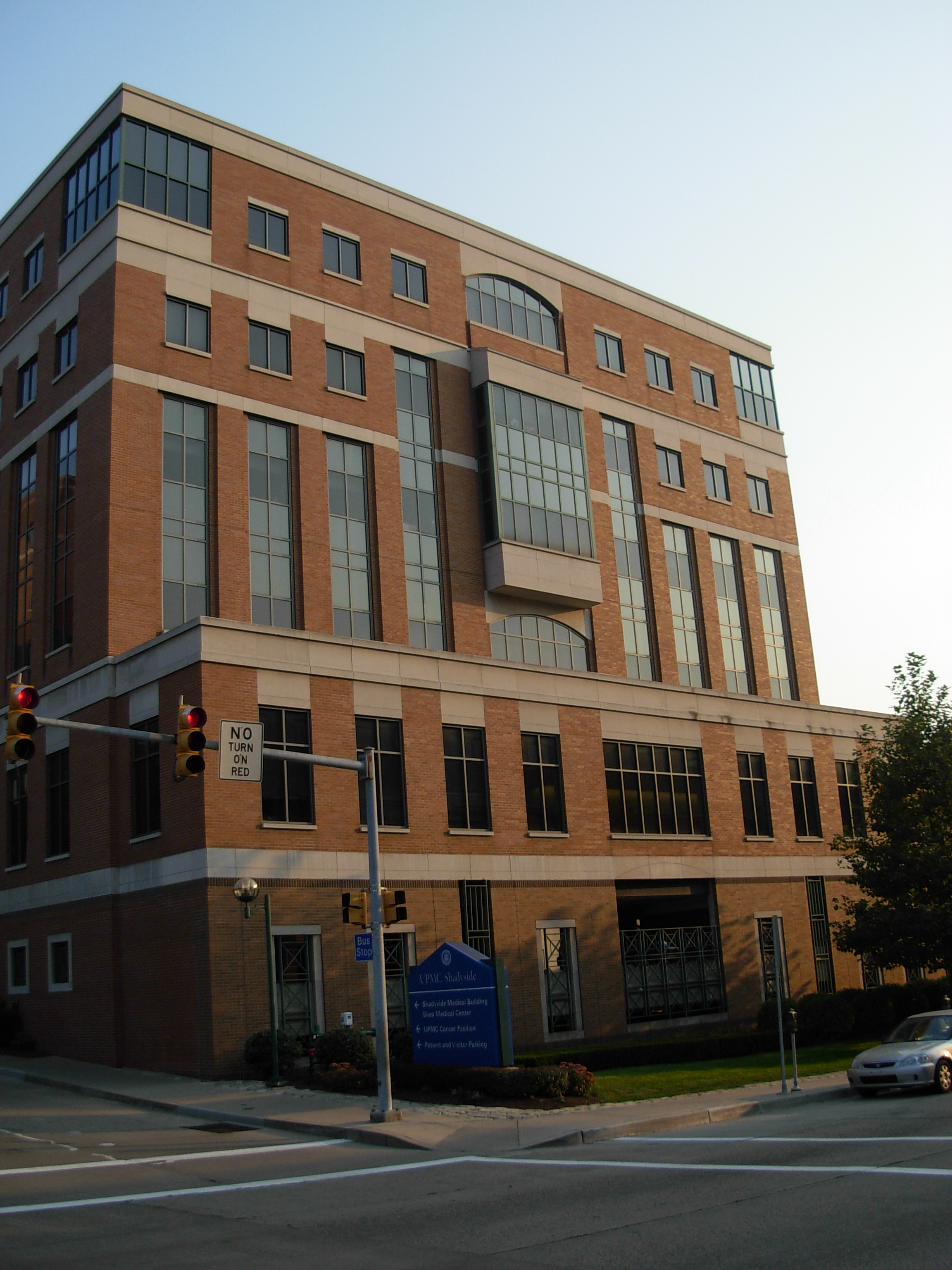
A wing of UPMC Shadyside, the co-flagship hospital of UPMC

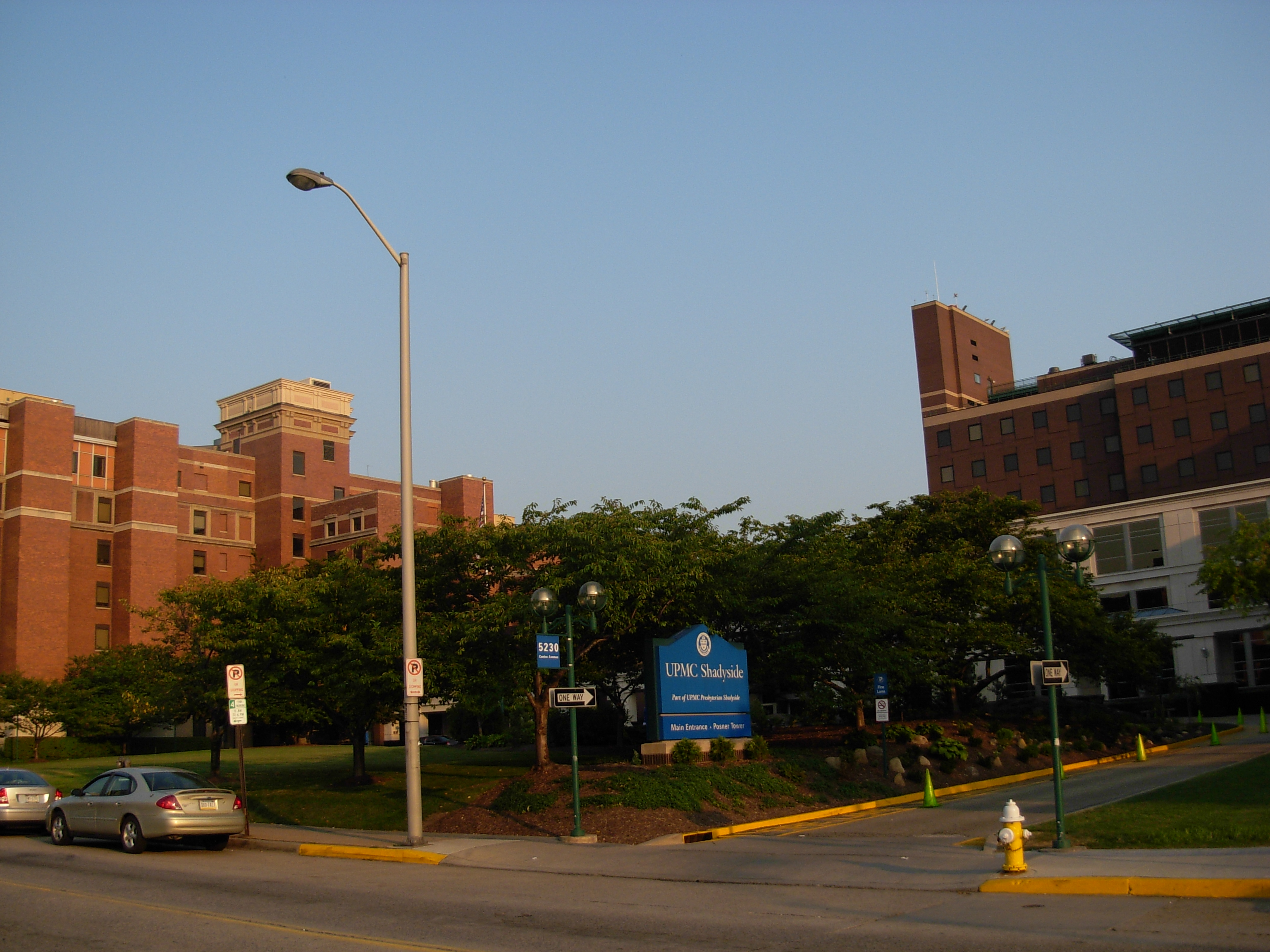
UPMC Shadyside

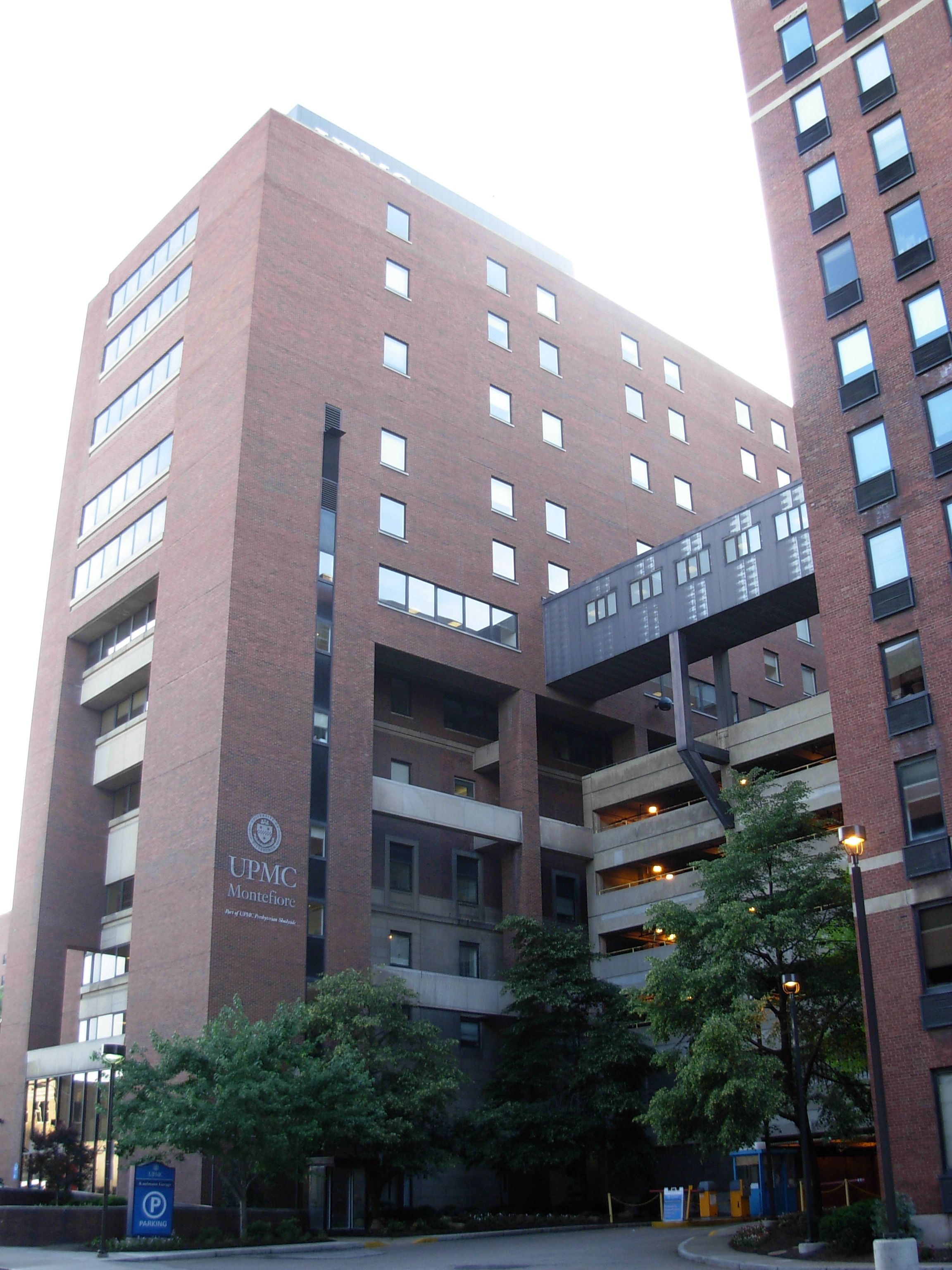
UPMC Montefiore on the Oakland campus

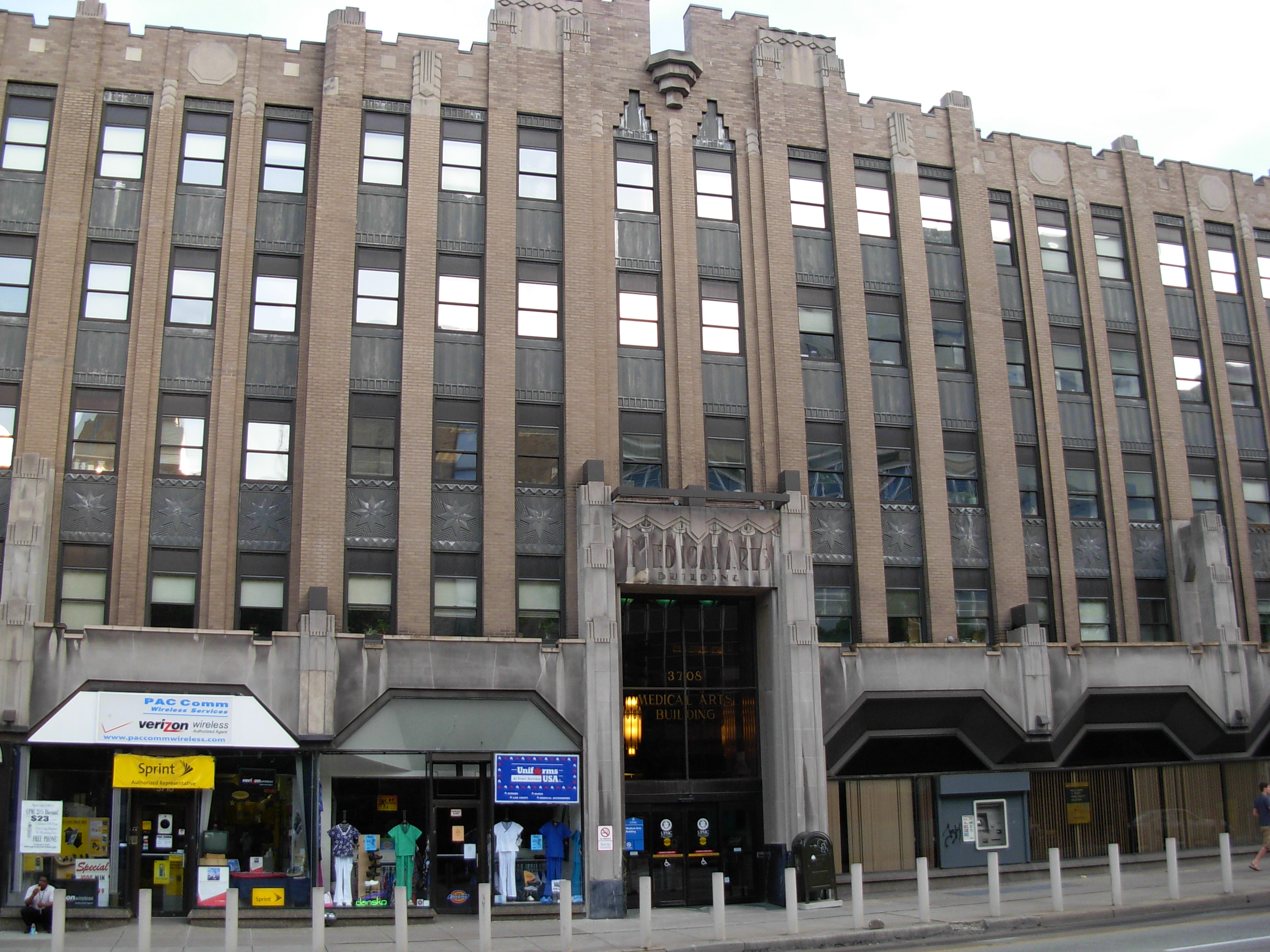
Medical Arts Building in Oakland

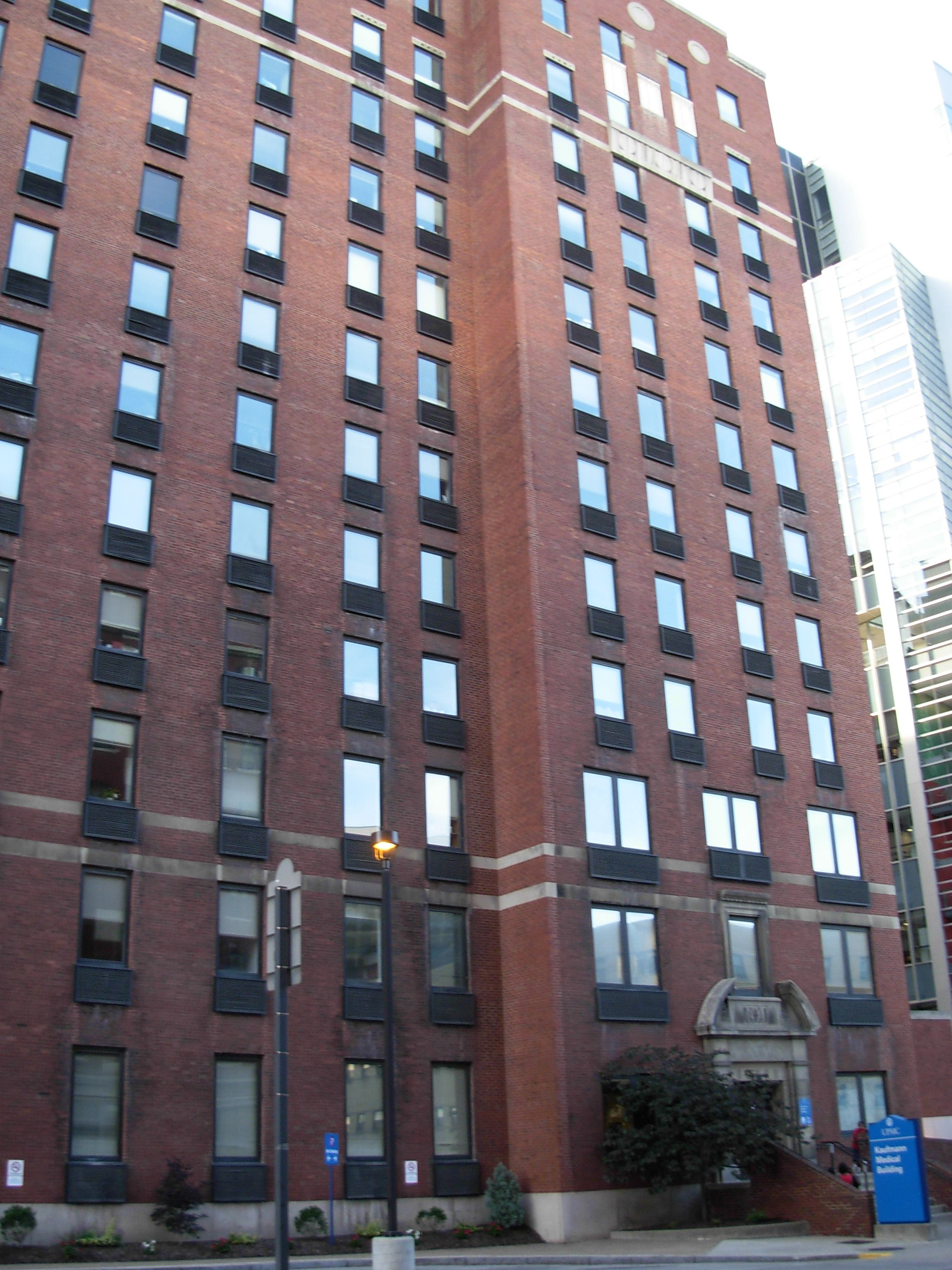
Kaufmann Medical Building in Oakland

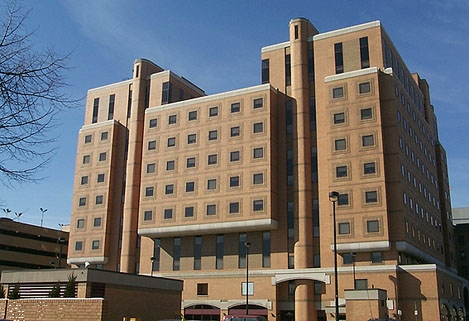
Forbes Tower in Oakland

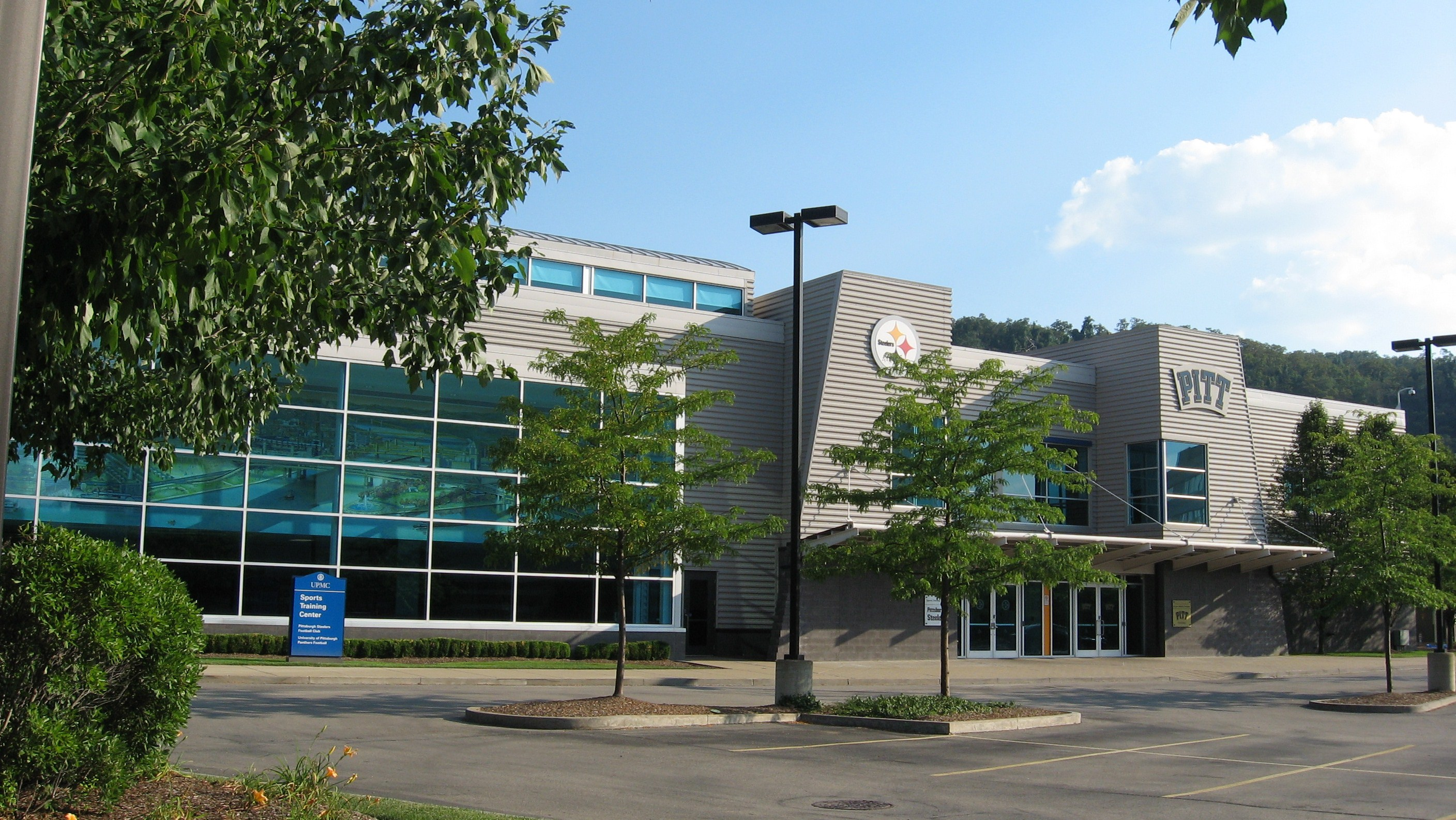
UPMC Rooney Sports Complex

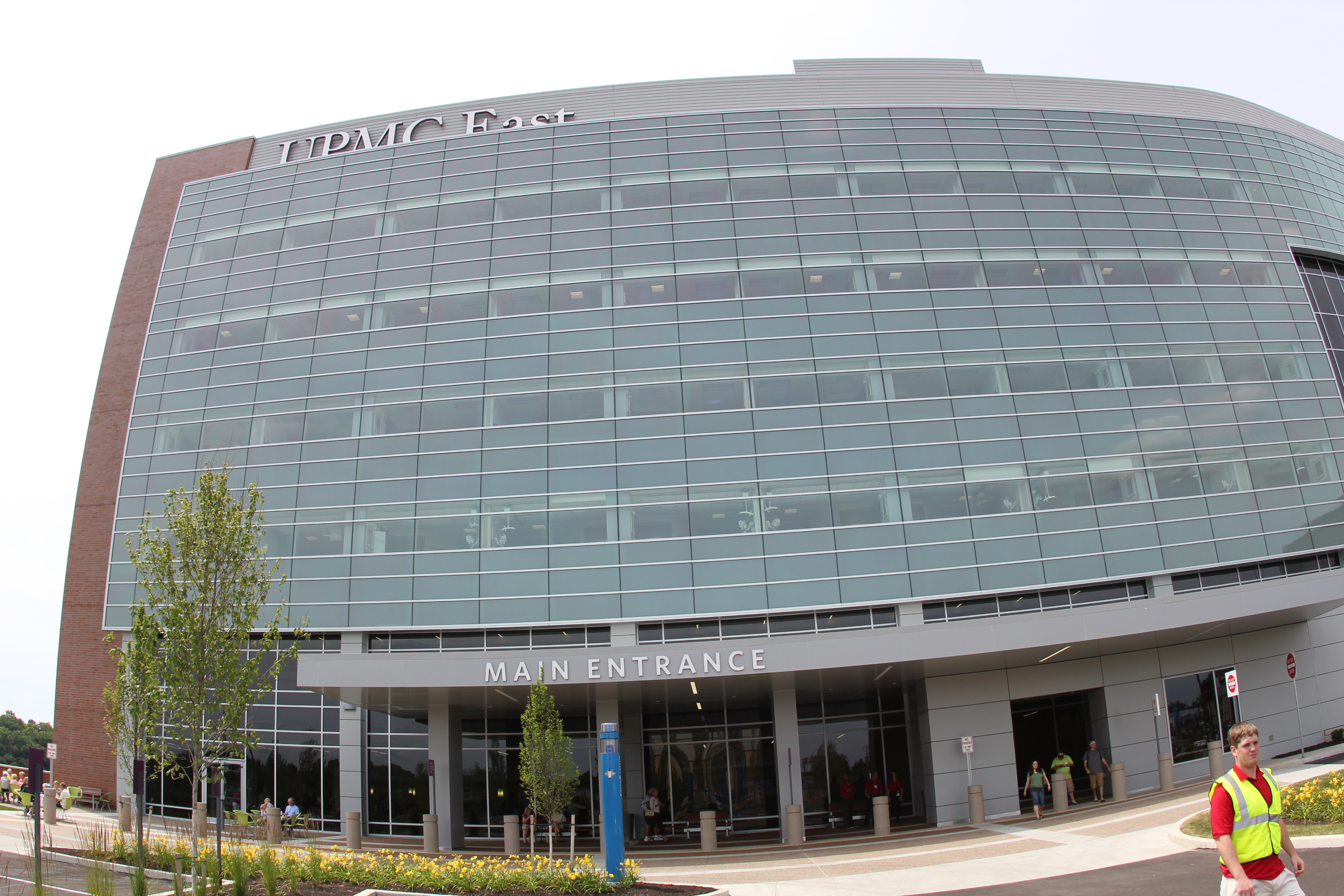
UPMC East

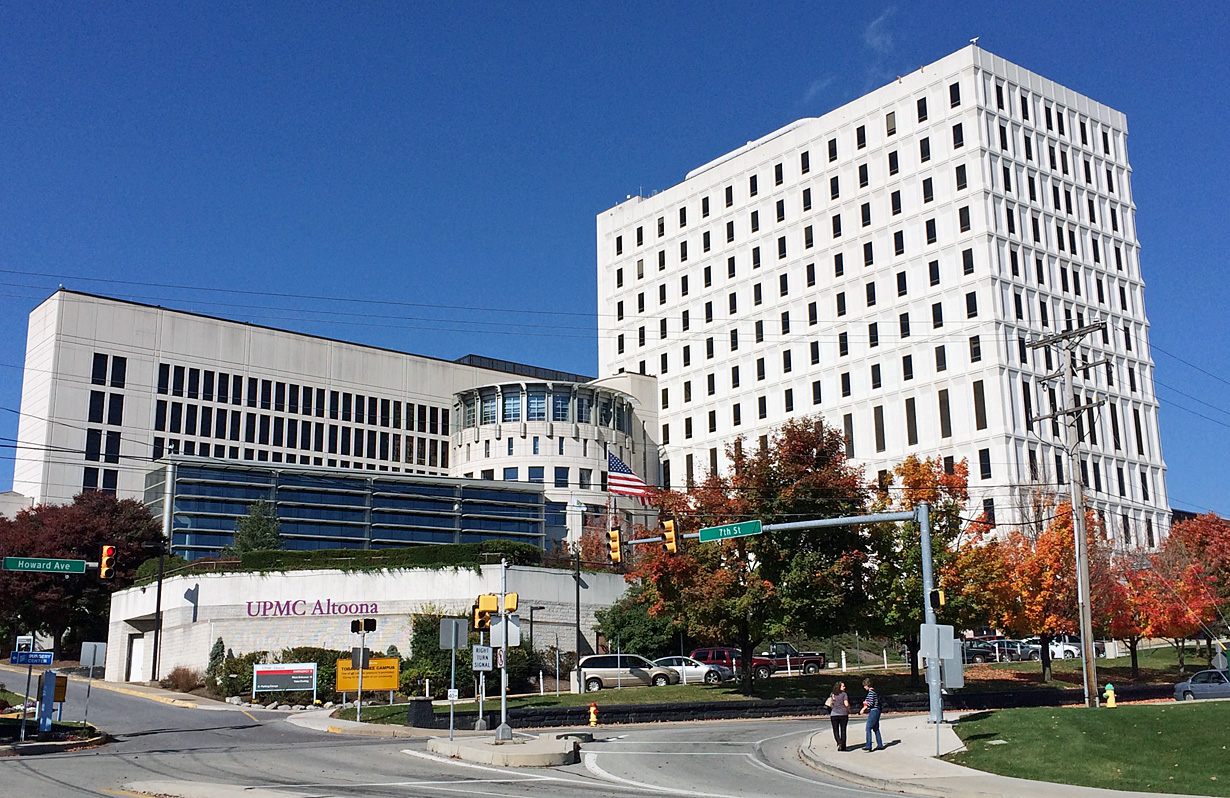
UPMC Altoona

== See also ==
- UPMC Heart and Transplant Hospital
- List of UPMC Hospitals
