= UPMC Hillman Cancer Center =

- University of Pittsburgh Medical Center

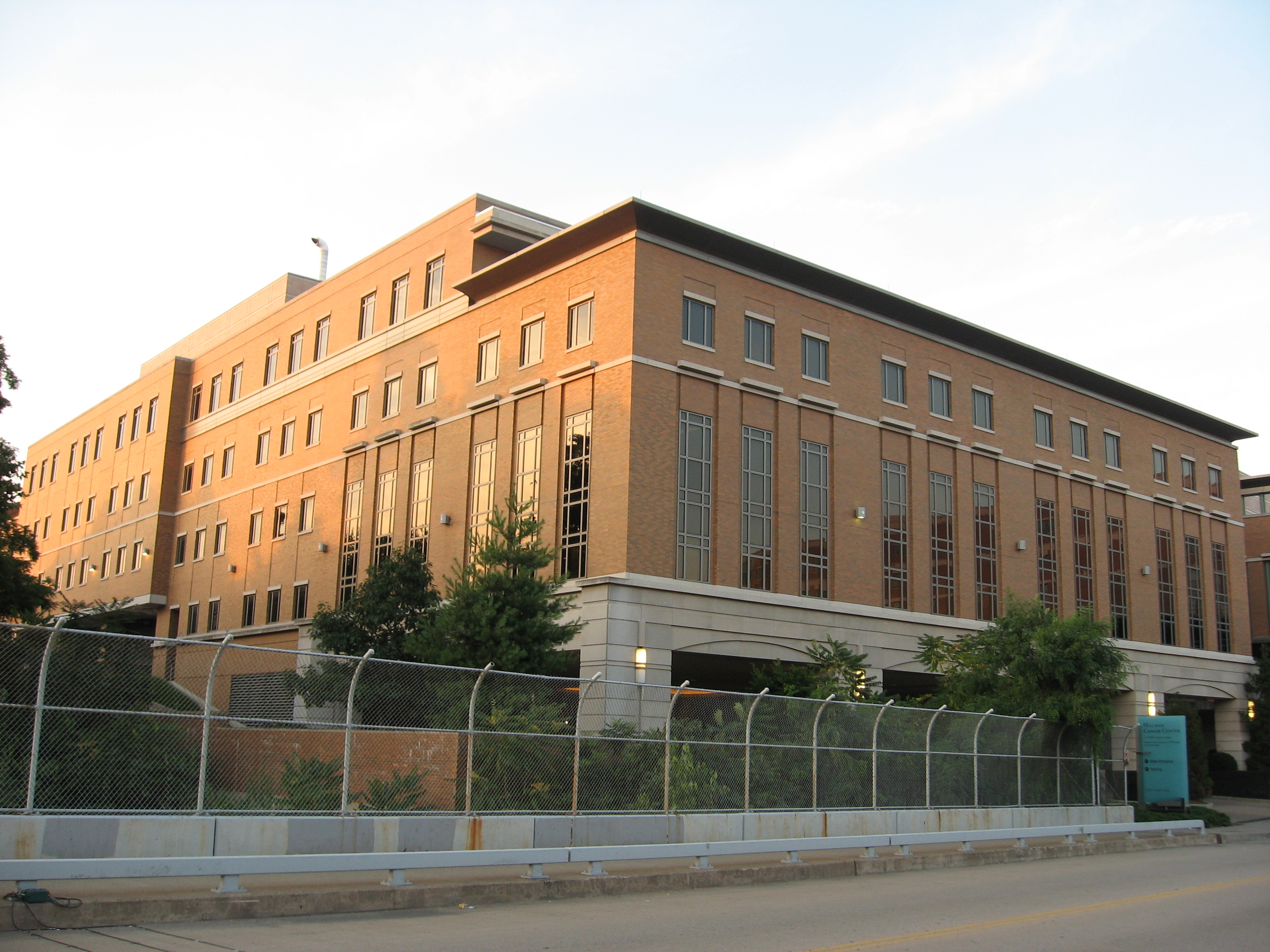
- Hillman Cancer Center, home of the University of Pittsburgh Cancer Institute and UPMC Cancer Centers

Geography
- Location: 5115 Centre Ave, Pittsburgh
- Coordinates: 40.4553°N 79.9424°W

Organisation
- Type: Cancer hospital

Links
- Website: hillman.upmc.com

The UPMC Hillman Cancer Center, previously the University of Pittsburgh Cancer Institute (UPCI), is a National Cancer Institute (NCI)-designated Comprehensive Cancer Center located in the Hillman Cancer Center in the Shadyside neighborhood of Pittsburgh, adjacent to UPMC Shadyside. The only NCI-designated cancer center in Western Pennsylvania, Hillman is composed of collaborative academic and research efforts between the University of Pittsburgh, the University of Pittsburgh Medical Center (UPMC), and Carnegie Mellon University. Hillman provides clinical cancer care to some 74,000 patients treated at its facilities at both the Hillman Cancer Center location in the Shadyside neighborhood of Pittsburgh and at UPMC-affiliated sites throughout Pennsylvania, New York, Ohio, and overseas locations. Founded in 1984, Hillman became the youngest cancer center in history to achieve NCI-designation. As of 2007, Hillman had received nearly $200 million in funding from the National Cancer Institute, which ranks it as one of the top ten cancer research institutes.

== Cancer institute ==
The Pittsburgh Cancer Institute was founded in 1985 under the direction of Ronald B. Herberman, MD. In 1990, the center earned NCI designation. The Hillman Cancer Center was opened in 2002 and housed the clinical services for UPMC Cancer Centers and research facilities for the Pittsburgh Cancer Institute. Hillman is the only NCI-designated Comprehensive Cancer Center in Western Pennsylvania.

Most Hillman faculty maintain academic appointments at the University of Pittsburgh and physician-scientists have their clinical appointments through UPMC hospitals. Some Hillman members are affiliated with the neighboring Carnegie Mellon University. Four target research areas of molecular and medical oncology at the institute include: cancer development and progression; identification of new biomarkers for improved cancer detection and diagnosis; the development of novel therapeutics for cancer treatment; and cancer prevention measures.

In 2017, Robert L. Ferris was named director of the UPCI and UPMC Cancer Centers. In December 2020, earned a five-year renewal as a comprehensive cancer center from NCI and was awarded a $30 million grant. Hillman works with UPMC Cancer Centers Network to translate the latest research advances to clinical application for patients. Hillman also offers education, training programs and fellowships, in conjunction with related schools within the University of Pittsburgh. In June 2021, the hospital completed a three-year expansion project.

== Cancer center network ==
UPMC Hillman Cancer Center offers the latest advances in cancer prevention, detection, diagnosis, and treatment to patients at UPMC-affiliated locations throughout the Pittsburgh region and abroad. The centers combine to create a network of more than 2,300 physicians, scientists, administrative staff, and other health care professionals that provide the latest care, technology, and treatments, as well as clinical trials, to over 36,000 patients each year. UPMC CancerCenter encompass 13 areas of expertise, each focusing on a specific type or treatment of cancer. These include programs devoted to melanoma, brain cancers, breast cancer, colon and gastrointestinal cancers, head and neck cancers, leukemias and lymphomas, liver cancer, lung cancer, gynecologic cancers, prostate and urologic cancers, and stem cell transplantation. Pediatric cancers are treated by specialists at the UPMC Children's Hospital of Pittsburgh.

=== Locations ===
The network works as a hub-and-satellite system of cancer care services at locations that are tied to the central hub and the flagship facility of the UPMC cancer center network, the UPMC Hillman Cancer Center in the Shadyside neighborhood of Pittsburgh. The UPMC network covers a geographic area of more than 200 miles (320 km) around greater Pittsburgh, comprising 180 affiliated oncologists at over 30 locations throughout Western and Central Pennsylvania and Ohio and includes a growing list of international locations starting in Dublin and Waterford, Ireland, and a radiotherapy center in Rome. In November, 2008, UPMC announced a partnership with GE Healthcare to open 25 additional cancer treatment centers across Europe and the Middle East over the next ten years.

==== Flagship facility ====
The UPMC Hillman Cancer Center in the Shadyside neighborhood of Pittsburgh is the flagship facility for the clinical services and research activities. The $130 million, 350,000-square-foot, 5-story facility, designed by Pittsburgh architectural firm IKM, opened in 2002 in the Shadyside neighborhood of Pittsburgh. It is located across Centre Avenue from, and connected via a pedestrian bridge to, UPMC Shadyside hospital, where cancer surgery and Intensity Modulated Radiation Therapy (IMRT) are conducted. The Hillman Cancer Center houses both a research pavilion and a clinical pavilion connected by a three-story atrium.

The facility brings together 400 full-time researchers and clinicians and 185 physicians practicing in the UPMC Cancer Centers network. The clinical pavilion offers cancer prevention, risk assessment, detection, treatment, and stress and symptom management services including radiology services such as magnetic resonance imaging (MRI), ultrasound, computed tomography (CT) and positron emission tomography (PET). It also includes waiting rooms equipped with televisions and play areas for children and access to a kitchen stocked with beverages and refreshments. The outpatient clinic, known as The William Cooper Pavilion, honoring the oncologist who led the campaign for philanthropic support of the center, was designed by architectural firm Radelet McCarthy. The Hillman Cancer Center also offers other amenities for patients including valet parking, a patient and family education and information center, a garden and meditation area, a café, a gift shop and a salon where patients can receive salon services and purchase wigs, hats, skin care products and prostheses.

In 2012, the UPMC Hillman Cancer Center opened the Mario Lemieux Center for Blood Cancers. The center is dedicated to former Pittsburgh Penguins hockey player Mario Lemieux, who was diagnosed with Hodgkin's lymphoma in 1993 and was cured.

The center houses the bronze "Circle of Care" statue by Tuck Langland of Granger, Indiana.

== Notable people associated with the Institute ==
- Jane A. Cauley, Department of Epidemiology
- Devra Davis, founding director of the Center for Environmental Oncology at the Institute

== See also ==
- University of Pittsburgh School of Medicine
- NCI-designated Cancer Center
- Association of American Cancer Institutes
