= UPMC Somerset =

Non-profit, general acute care community hospital

Coordinates: 40.0070°N 79.0778°W

UPMC Somerset is a non-profit, general acute care community hospital that was founded on January 31, 1921 and is located at 225 South Center Avenue Somerset, Pennsylvania 15501. It has 111 licensed beds and five operating rooms making it the largest hospital in Somerset County.

On June 28, 2018, Somerset Hospital announced it was exploring an affiliation with the University of Pittsburgh Medical Center (UPMC), and on November 1, 2018, the two entities announced that they had signed a binding integration and affiliation agreement. Somerset Hospital officially merged with UPMC on February 1, 2019, becoming UPMC Somerset.
