= UPMC Washington =

- UPMC
- Location within Pennsylvania Location within the United States

Geography
- Location: 155 Wilson Ave, Washington, Pennsylvania, United States
- Coordinates: 40°10′59″N 80°14′46″W

History
- Founded: 1882

Links
- Lists: Hospitals in Pennsylvania

UPMC Washington, formerly the Washington Hospital, is a major hospital and healthcare provider in Washington County, Pennsylvania. It is located in the City of Washington at 155 Wilson Avenue. The hospital has a staff of 6,200.

Washington Hospital merged with UPMC on June 1, 2024.
