= UPMC Williamsport =

- University of Pittsburgh Medical Center
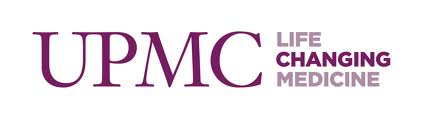

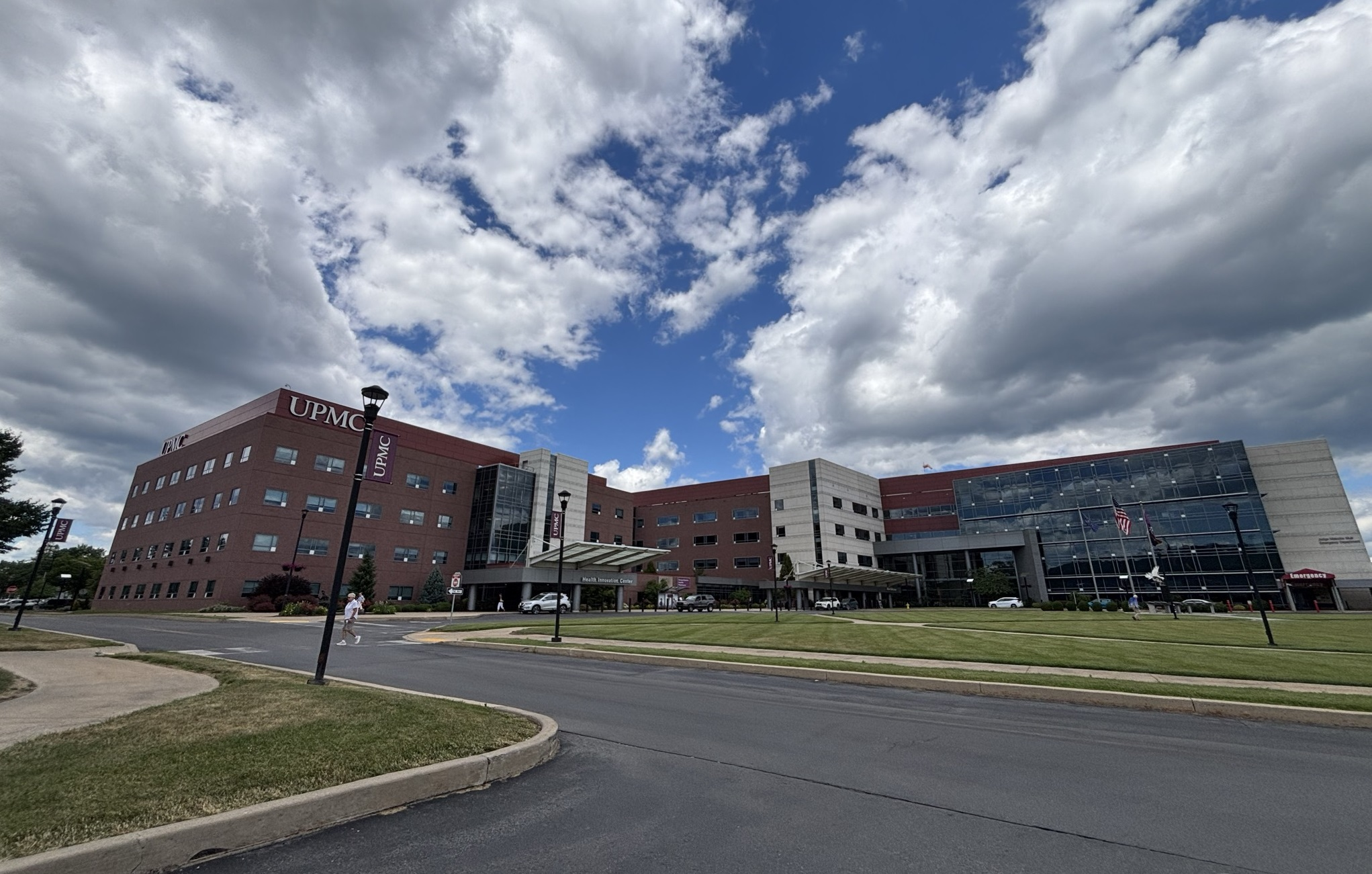
- UPMC Williamsport in 2026

Geography
- Location: 700 High St, Williamsport, Pennsylvania, United States
- Coordinates: 41.2470°N 77.0155°W

Organization
- Type: 24-hr emergency

Services
- Emergency department: Level II trauma
- Beds: 224

Helipads
- Helipad: (FAA LID: 66PA)
Number	Length		Surface
Number	ft	m	Surface
H1	50	15	Concrete, rooftop

History
- Founded: 1873

Links
- Lists: Hospitals in Pennsylvania

UPMC Williamsport, formerly UPMC Susquehanna Williamsport and Williamsport Regional Medical Center, is a hospital of University of Pittsburgh Medical Center (UPMC) located in Williamsport, Pennsylvania. Originally established in 1873 as the Williamsport Hospital, it currently operates at least 224 beds and is a level II trauma center.

== History ==
Originally established in 1873 as the Williamsport Hospital, UPMC Williamsport is a general medical and surgical hospital in Williamsport, Pennsylvania, operating at least 224 beds. The hospital is accredited by the Commission on Accreditation of Rehabilitation Facilities. Services include the Heart & Vascular Institute, the first intensive care unit in Central Pennsylvania, pharmacy, 24-hour emergency department, inpatient services including same day surgery, a family practice residency program, and more.

Following several industrial accidents that occurred in the early 1870s, members of the Lycoming County Medical Society decided there was a need for a hospital where patients could be fed and cared for in a clean environment. In 1873, upon petition by members of the Lycoming County Medical Society and 23 leading citizens of the community, the Lycoming County Court granted a Charter establishing The Williamsport Hospital.

Williamsport Regional Medical Center was part of an alliance of three hospitals that formed Susquehanna Health in 1994. Williamsport Regional Medical Center became part of the UPMC network when Susquehanna Health was integrated into the University of Pittsburgh Medical Center (UPMC) on October 18, 2016.

UPMC Williamsport became a level II trauma center in 2021.

== Incidents ==
=== 2017 fire ===
On July 25, 2017, the Williamsport Fire Department responded to a reported fire at the hospital. When they arrived, it was revealed that a patient at the hospital had set herself on fire with a lighter. Three hospital employees entered the room to put the woman out; two of them were injured. The woman, who was known to have mental health problems was sent to the burn unit in critical condition. The damage was confined into the patient's room only. After about 10 minutes the evacuation was lifted and the hospital reopened.

Three days later the woman died from her injuries.

== Services ==
The hospital provides a variety of specialties to both adults and children.

- Colorectal Surgery
- Dermatology
- Emergency (38 rooms including:)
  - 4 behavioral health rooms
  - An orthopedic room
  - An ear, nose, and throat room
    - Has an exam chair rather than a bed
  - 2 sexual assault specialty rooms
    - Has private doors, bathroom & shower, and are seen by SANE (Sexual Assault Nurse Examiners) nurses
  - 2 critical care rooms
    - Has an adjacent X-ray & CT scan department
- Family Medicine Residency Program
- Gastroenterology
- General Surgery
- Gynecologic Oncology
- Heart & Vascular Institute
- Imaging Services
- Infectious Disease
- Internal Medicine
- Inpatient Rehabilitation
- Laboratory Services
- Neurology
- Neurosurgery
- OB/GYN
- Orthopedics
- Labor & Delivery
- Pediatrics (Birth through age 21)
- Pharmacy
- Pulmonology
- Rehabilitation Services
- Reproductive Health Center
- Robotic Surgery
- Spine Care
- Surgery Center
- The Birthplace (Maternity)
  - Including a Level II nursery
- Urology

== See also ==
- List of hospitals in Pennsylvania
- University of Pittsburgh Medical Center
