= UPMC St. Margaret =

- University of Pittsburgh Medical Center

- Location of UPMC St. Margaret in Pittsburgh

Geography
- Location: Pittsburgh, Pennsylvania, United States
- Coordinates: 40.4893°N 79.8960°W

Organization
- Care system: Private
- Type: Community

Services
- Beds: 249

History
- Founded: 1898

Links
- Website: http://stmargaret.upmc.com/
- Lists: Hospitals in Pennsylvania

UPMC St. Margaret is a mid-sized, acute care, teaching community hospital of the University of Pittsburgh Medical Center, located in the Lincoln–Lemington–Belmar neighborhood of Pittsburgh, Pennsylvania, adjacent to the borough of Aspinwall. Situated on 21 acres (8.5 ha), the hospital has 249 beds with more than 800 physicians and 1,500 clinical staff members. In March 2009, UPMC St. Margaret achieved Magnet Recognition status. Magnet status is the highest international recognition for nursing excellence and leadership.

== History ==
Margaret Cust was born in 1809 in Greensburg, Pennsylvania. Margaret married John Shoenberger in the mid-1830s, where they lived a gracious life in Pittsburgh. They lived in a beautiful mansion on Penn Avenue. Today, their home is the site of Gateway Center. In 1837, they built a second house in Collinstown, which is now called Lawrenceville. The home was the site of the first Saint Margaret Hospital.

Margaret and John Shoenberger lived the ideal life in the nineteenth century; however, their wealth could not buy good health and children. Their great-nephew and great-niece were named after them but they died young. Margaret Cust Blair died at age thirteen and Thomas Shoenberger Blair lived from 1848 to 1852. Also, Margaret's health was declining. She was diagnosed with breast cancer in the 1870s. She died at her home in Lawrenceville on August 30, 1878.

After Margaret died, John Shoenberger moved to New York City. He sold his Lawrenceville estate to Allegheny Cemetery. In New York City, he married Alice E. Taylor. John Shoenberger died in New York on November 12, 1889. John left the people of Pittsburgh about $10 million ($358.3 million today), along with more than 3 acres (1.2 ha) of land to build and maintain a hospital to immortalize his first wife. It shall forever be called and known as St. Margaret's Hospital. The hospital was dedicated in 1898 on 46th Street in the Lawrenceville neighborhood, where it remained for 82 years. St. Margaret's Hospital was a longtime ministry of the Episcopal Diocese of Pittsburgh whose convention appointed its board of trustees until 2003.

Throughout the 1970s, the committee realized that St. Margaret's was unable to expand at the Lawrenceville site. A location that appealed to the Long Range Planning Committee was the site of Pittsburgh's former water filtration plant, across the Allegheny from Lawrenceville and adjacent to the Borough of Aspinwall. The St. Margaret family broke ground on November 29, 1976. The new building was ready by March 1980. The old hospital in Lawrenceville was demolished around 1985 and replaced with an apartment complex, though a large section of its original wrought iron fence remains in place and is listed as a Contributing Object in the Lawrenceville Historic District.

In 1971 St. Margaret established a Family Medicine residency program. Some of the original physicians graduating from that very first program are teaching and practicing at St. Margaret Hospital today. The program is a three-year residency program with fellowship opportunities in sports medicine, geriatrics, and faculty development. In addition to a medical residency program, St Margaret has a pharmacy program as well.

In 1994, St. Margaret first partnered up with University of Pittsburgh Medical Center (UPMC) as part of the Tri-State Health System. In 1996, St. Margaret Memorial Hospital officially merged with UPMC and became UPMC St. Margaret. UPMC St. Margaret has stated its dedication to maintain its mission of service to the community.

== Facilities ==
Besides UPMC St. Margaret's main hospital, it also oversees UPMC Natrona Heights, the UPMC St. Margaret Harmar Outpatient Center in as well as family health centers located in Lawrenceville, Bloomfield-Garfield, and New Kensington. UPMC St. Margaret also runs the St. Margaret Hospital School of Nursing, which offers an RN program.

In 2013, UPMC St. Margaret opened the Neil Y. Van Horn Pavilion & Helen and Miles Colwell Garden of Hope, funded by St. Margaret Foundation, which provides patients with a library and information center as well as garden.

The hospitalist department is phenomenal.

== Services ==
UPMC St. Margaret services include:

- Bariatric surgery (weight loss surgery)
- Cancer care
- Cardiovascular services
- Critical care
- Dermatology
- Diabetes and endocrinology
- Emergency medicine
- Family health and family health centers
- Geriatric care
- Gastrointestinal services
- Lung and thoracic diseases
- Orthopaedics
- Pain management
- Primary care
- Radiology/imaging services
- Rehabilitation
- UPMC Rehabilitation Institute (inpatient rehabilitation)
- Outpatient occupational therapy
- Outpatient physical therapy
- Sleep disorders
- Sports medicine
- Stroke telemedicine program
- Surgical services
