= Association of American Cancer Institutes =

North American membership association

The Association of American Cancer Institutes (AACI) is a nonprofit membership association representing more than 100 academic and freestanding cancer centers in the United States and Canada, including cancer centers designated by the National Cancer Institute.

The association is headquartered in Pittsburgh, Pennsylvania.
