= Geeta Swamy =

American obstetrician and gynecologist

- Born: January 15, 1971 (age 55); Griffin, Georgia, US

Academic background
- Education: BSc, Biostatistics, 1993, University of North Carolina at Chapel Hill; MD, 1997, UNC School of Medicine

Geeta Krishna Swamy (born January 15, 1971) is an American OBGYN. She is the incoming Dean of the Boston University School of Medicine, beginning her tenure on January 1. She is currently professor of obstetrics and gynecology at Duke University and Associate Vice President for Research and Vice Dean for Scientific Integrity.

== Early life and education ==
Swamy was born on January 15, 1971, in Griffin, Georgia, USA. She graduated from Lumberton Senior High School in 1989 and enrolled in the UNC Gillings School of Global Public Health for her Bachelor of Science in Public Health and Biostatistics. Following medical school, Swamy completed her residency at the UPMC Magee-Womens Hospital under Phillip Heine. When Heine left UPMC for Duke University, he recruited Swamy to join him for her medical fellowship studying how infectious diseases contribute to or cause preterm birth.

== Career ==
Upon completing her fellowship in Maternal-Fetal Medicine, Swamy then joined Duke ObGyn as an assistant professor in 2004. Early into her career at Duke, Swamy volunteered on the Institutional Review Board (IRB), which oversees all human research studies at Duke, and later led the board. As an assistant professor, she led a study on the quality of life premature babies might experience. She used data collected from 1.2 million Norwegian birth over decades to come to the conclusion that those who were born prematurely had higher death rates in childhood and were more likely to be childless in adulthood. As a result of her research, she was the recipient of the 2008 National Institutes of Health (NIH) Young Investigator Award for Perinatal Research and received special recognition from the NIH National Institute of Allergy and Infectious Diseases (NIAID) for her research work during the 2009 swine flu pandemic.

During the 2012 academic year, Swamy was promoted to associate professor of Obstetrics and Gynecology,. While serving in this role, she simultaneously served as a member of the Duke Human Vaccine Institute and associate dean for Regulatory Oversight & Research Initiatives in Clinical Research. In 2017, Swamy was appointed senior associate dean at the Duke University School of Medicine. The following year, Swamy was named Vice Dean and Associate Vice Provost for Scientific Integrity and selected as a Fellow for the Drexel University College of Medicine Hedwig van Ameringen Executive Leadership in Academic Medicine Program for Women.

During the COVID-19 pandemic, Swamy was an investigator in numerous vaccine trials at Duke. Her roles include serving as a co-investigator for the COVID-19 vaccine trial, as Chair of the Independent Data Monitoring Committee for GlaxoSmithKline trials involving novel RSV vaccine in pregnant women, and as Chair of the Independent Data Monitoring Committee for Pfizer trials involving novel GBS vaccine in pregnant women. She also published scholarly articles studying the effects the COVID-19 vaccines had on pregnant women. On December 15, 2020, she was one of the first people to receive the vaccine.
