= GKJ =

GKJ may refer to:

- Golokganj railway station, in Assam, India
- Javanese Christian Church
- Port Meadville Airport, in Pennsylvania, United States
