= STAT Medevac =

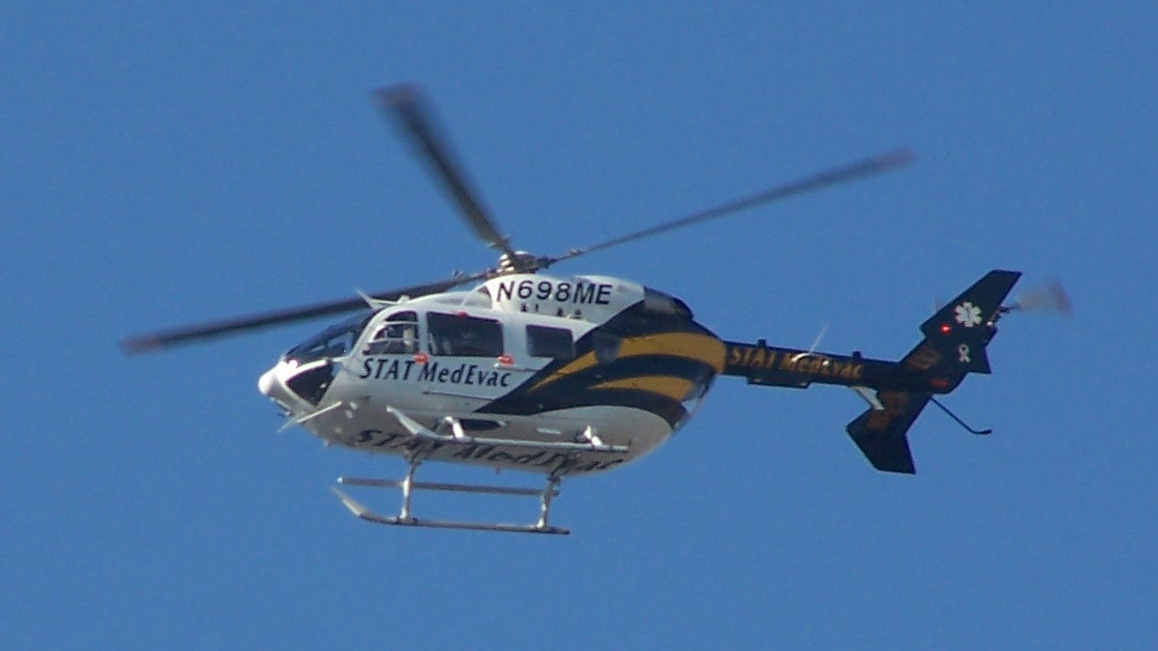
STAT MedEvac helicopter above UPMC Presbyterian Hospital.

STAT MedEvac "originally STAT Angel One" is a service of the Center for Emergency Medicine of Western Pennsylvania in Pittsburgh, Pennsylvania. The primary function of STAT MedEvac is to provide emergency medevac and air medical transport of critically wounded or sick civilians, either from emergency scenes or between hospitals. As of July of 2017, the organization also operates two ground ambulances for patients with severe injury or critical illness. STAT MedEvac is directed by a consortium of hospitals of the University of Pittsburgh Medical Center (UPMC) that include UPMC Children's Hospital of Pittsburgh, UPMC Altoona, UPMC Hamot, UPMC Mercy and UPMC Presbyterian Shadyside. STAT MedEvac's base of operations is in West Mifflin, Pennsylvania, at the Allegheny County Airport. With 18 air bases across Pennsylvania, Maryland, New York, Ohio, and the District of Columbia, it is one of the largest single operated and dispatched air-medical service organizations in the United States.

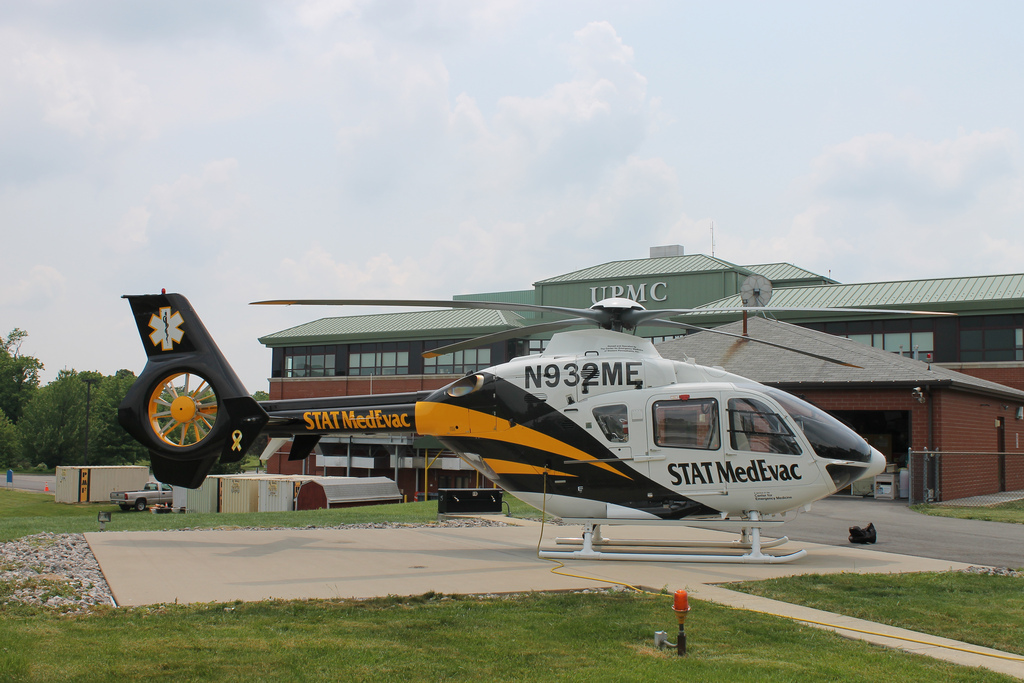
STAT MedEvac 3, a Eurocopter EC 135, on the pad at UPMC Passavant Cranberry Hospital.

== History ==
1984
STAT MedEvac completes their first transport.
1994
Opens two helicopter bases, bringing the total number to five, and began using IFR.
1999
Opened a base in Cleveland, Ohio, in partnership with University Hospitals, bringing total number of helicopter bases to eight.
2000
Opened bases in Clearfield, Pennsylvania, and Baltimore, Maryland.
2001
Opened STAT MedEvac 11 in Altoona, Pennsylvania, at the Altoona Hospital.
2002
Opened another base in Lorain, Ohio, in partnership with University Hospitals. University STAT 8 crashes on takeoff from University Hospital, killing the pilot and flight nurse. The flight medic survives.
2003
Opened three more helicopter bases: York, PA. Youngstown, OH, Kittanning, PA. Also began operating the existing flight program based at Robert Packer Hospital in Sayre, PA.
2004
STAT MedEvac operations in Cleveland and Ohio are transferred to University Hospitals (STAT 8 and 12).
2005
Opens new base in New Philadelphia, OH. Designated "MedEvac 8" as the former Medevac 8 base was no longer operated by STAT MedEvac. Opens new base in Hagerstown, Maryland, designated as "STAT MedEvac 12."
2006
Opens new base in Dansville, NY. This base was closed later that year after approximately 8 months. STAT 8 in New Philadelphia, OH was closed simultaneously. New base opened in Washington, DC in partnership with Children's National Medical Center. STAT MedEvac is accredited by the Commission on Accreditation of Medical Transport Systems.
2007
STAT MedEvac opens STAT 18 at the Children's National Medical Center. Dubbed "SkyBear".
2010
STAT MedEvac becomes the Air Operations Vendor for Lifestar, based in Harborcreek, PA. Lifestar, a division of EmergyCare, Inc., provides the medical crew and STAT MedEvac provides the pilot and Direct Air Carrier services. Medical crew operate under the STAT MedEvac protocols and receive Medical Command through STATComm.
2017
Added two ground units dubbed STAT Medevac 53 and 54 to aid in the transport of critical patients after PA Department of Health expands protocols to allow licensure of critical care ground units.
2018
Added two more ground units, as well as a neonatal critical care ambulance and neonate critical care team in conjunction with UPMC Children's Hospital of Pittsburgh and UPMC Prehospital Services.
2019
Added 3 new Airbus H135's to the fleet. First H135's in the United States to be equipped with Helionix Avionics.

== Aircraft ==
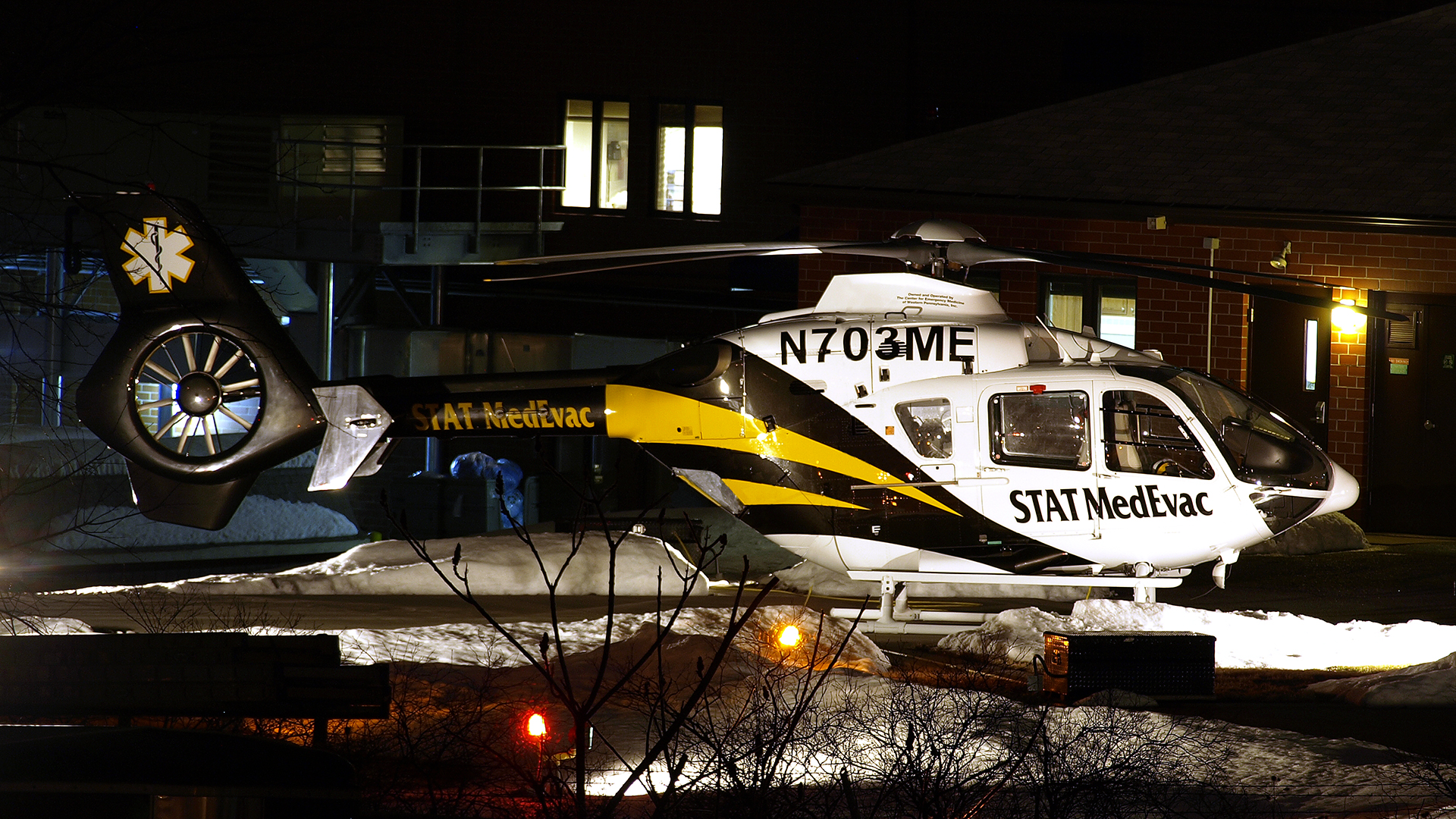
STAT MedEvac 5, a Eurocopter EC 135, on the pad at UPMC Passavant Hospital.

STAT MedEvac uses two types of helicopters for patient transport, the Eurocopter EC 135, and the EC-145. Their fleet has included the MBB Bo 105, Eurocopter AS-355 F2 Twinstar and AS-365 N3 Dauphin, the MBB/Kawasaki BK 117 and the Bell 430 (N430Q, which set an around-the-world speed record in 1996).

STAT MedEvac is a Direct Air Carrier (Certificate: E3MA774L) and arranges and coordinates the operation of air ambulance services. All flights are operated by STAT MedEvac.

=== Locations ===
- STAT MedEvac 1 - The Washington Hospital, Washington, Washington County, PA.
- STAT MedEvac 2 - Air Rescue East, Greensburg, Westmoreland County, PA
- STAT MedEvac 3 - UPMC Passavant Cranberry, Cranberry Township, Butler County, PA.
- STAT MedEvac 4 - UPMC Children's Hospital of Pittsburgh, Pittsburgh, Allegheny County, PA.
- STAT MedEvac 5 - Joseph A. Hardy Connellsville Airport, Lemont Furnace, Fayette County, PA.
- STAT MedEvac 6 - Clarion County Airport, Shippenville, Clarion County, PA.
- STAT MedEvac 7 - Port Meadville Airport, Vernon Township, Crawford County, PA
- STAT MedEvac 8 - Grove City Airport, Springfield Township, Mercer County, PA
- STAT MedEvac 9 - Clearfield-Lawrence Airport, Lawrence Township, Clearfield County, PA.
- STAT MedEvac 10 (Johns Hopkins Lifeline) - Johns Hopkins Hospital, Inner Harbor, Baltimore, MD.
- STAT MedEvac 11 - UPMC Altoona, Altoona, Blair County, PA.
- STAT MedEvac 12 - UPMC Chautauqua, Jamestown, Chautauqua County, NY.
- STAT MedEvac 13 - York Airport, Thomasville, York County, PA.
- STAT MedEvac 14 - Youngstown Elser Metro Airport, North Lima, Mahoning County, OH.
- STAT MedEvac 15 - Jefferson County Airpark, Cross Creek Township, Jefferson County, OH
- STAT MedEvac 16 - Armstrong County Memorial Hospital, Kittanning, Armstrong County, PA.
- STAT MedEvac 17 (former Lifestar) - Harborcreek Township, Erie County, PA
- STAT MedEvac 18 (SkyBear) - Children's National Hospital, Washington, D.C.

== Communications ==
STAT MedEvac operates a three-department communications center. This communications center is staffed with 10-12 people at 12 workstations, performing a variety of tasks. A physician is assigned to the communications center to handle medical control of the three divisions of the communications center. Medical Command processes approximately 36,000 medical consults each year for various ambulance services and STAT MedEvac. STATCOM processes approximately 22,000 requests for medical service each year. They maintain contact with the helicopters by use of a 12-tower regional two-way radio system, Outerlink satellite tracking system, and satellite phones. Aeromed Software is used to identify the closest resources, and all phone and radio communications are recorded with the VoicePrint system. STAT-MD provides separate medical direction for several major airlines (Air Canada, Air Canada Rouge, Jazz, Emirates, Southwest, Frontier, Republic, Shuttle America, Sky Regional, and Delta), and approximately 2,500 physician consults are conducted every month, consisting of medical emergencies and pre-board medical screening. STAT-MD also provides services to US Steel, and telemedicine services to World Clinic. Over 400 Medjet customers are also assisted every month with physician consults, 'medevac' coordination, or repatriation services.

STAT Medevac developed emsCharts, prehospital data collection and management software products for air medical and ground Emergency Medical Services. The intellectual property rights to emsCharts were sold to two former managers in 2006 and it now exists as a completely separate entity owned by ZOLL.
