= Thomasville, Pennsylvania =

Unincorporated area in Pennsylvania, US

- Unincorporated community
- Location within Pennsylvania
- Coordinates: 39°53′43″N 76°51′1″W
- Country: United States
- State: Pennsylvania
- County: York

Area
  - Total: 15.9446 sq mi (41.296 km^{2})

Population (2000)
  - Total: 3,647
- Time zone: UTC-5 (Eastern (EST))
  - Summer (DST): UTC-4 (EDT)
- Zip code: 17364

Thomasville is an unincorporated community in Jackson Township of York County, Pennsylvania, United States, west of the city of York. The community is home to Martin's Potato Chips and York Airport.

== Schools ==
The community is located within the Spring Grove Area School District and administers the Paradise Elementary School with an enrollment of 355 students.

== Transportation ==
The Lincoln Highway, U.S. Route 30, serves Thomasville. Thomasville is home to the privately owned, public-use York Airport which houses a STAT Medevac unit.
