= QRT =

The abbreviation "QRT" may stand for:

- Quick response team, multiple uses
- The Quarto Group, a publisher of illustrated books (LSE ticker: QRT)
- QRT, in amateur radio, the Q code to shut down a station
- Quantitative PCR or qrt-PCR, a laboratory DNA detection technique
- Qube Research & Technologies, London-based quantitative investment management firm
- The "Quote Retweet" action on the social media network Twitter/X
- Quantitative Reporting Template: standardised, pre-defined electronic form used by insurance companies for Solvency II reporting
