= Drug abuse response team =

First responders for drug-related medical emergencies

In the United States, a quick response team (QRT), also known as a post-overdose outreach team or a drug abuse response team (DART), is an integrated, first responder and community paramedicine unit comprising law enforcement officers, rescue personnel, health care professionals and / or substance abuse counselors.

A QRT is trained to serve as a first responder unit for narcotic-related medical emergencies and, thereafter, to approach and counsel overdose victims during their "recovery windows" — the 72 hours immediately following life-threatening drug overdoses — when users are thought to be more open to accepting help.

At present, QRT and/or DART programs are operating in communities in at least 5 states (see "Proliferation" below).

== History ==
The QRT deflection model was first developed in 2014, in Colerain Township, Ohio — a 45-square-mile suburb in Hamilton County, just northwest of Cincinnati.

Colerain's then-safety services director, Dan Meloy – who had previously served as the township's police chief and, later, as the township's administrator — oversaw development of its pilot QRT program, in collaboration with the community's assistant fire chief Will Mueller (who is also an adjunct instructor of Fire science at the University of Cincinnati), and CEO Nan Franks and social worker Shana Merrick from the Addiction Services Council of Greater Cincinnati.

Concurrently and independently of the Colerain program, Lucas County, Ohio, developed its similar DART model, which it also first deployed in 2014.

== Impetus ==
Meloy and other Colerain officials saw the need to develop more innovative, person-centered approaches to reduce the then-sharply rising number of narcotic overdoses in their community, which had been particularly hard-hit by the United States' mid-2010s opioid epidemic.

At the time of the QRT pilot program's development, Colerain Township had approximately 60,000 residents, usually covered by just 33 fire/EMS personnel and 6 patrol officers at any given time.

Whereas in 2011, Colerain reported 51 total overdoses, by 2014 the annual number of overdoses in the community had risen to 141 – a 176% increase in just three years – according to statistics provided in 2016 by the township's Department of Public Safety to the non-profit organization Cover2 Resources, which had asked Colerain to consult as that organization assisted in the development of a similar QRT program in Summit County, Ohio (see "Proliferation" below).

== Organization ==
In the original Colerain model, a special tactics-trained police officer, a specially-trained firefighter-medic and an addiction counselor from the community were partnered to form a single QRT.

The community's initial QRT emergency responder candidate pool included 6 of the community's firefighter-medics who had previous experience serving as military, SWAT, or Hostage Rescue Team tactical medics (TACMEDs) and 5 police officers with special tactics training (through their service in the military, with SWAT, or on Narcotics Squads).

The chosen firefighter-medics received additional self-defense, chemical irritant deployment and de-escalation training. Special tactics training was deemed necessary, in township officials' estimation, due to the volatile circumstances that often prevail on scene during narcotics-related emergency responses.

Licensed substance abuse counselors were provided to the QRT program through a partnership with the Addiction Services Council of Greater Cincinnati.

The QRT program included a "360 Solution" component, under which all Colerain patrol officers were equipped with nasal-delivery naloxone (Narcan), provided by the Ohio Department of Health and Hamilton County Public Health.

Additionally, the police department canvassed the community several times door-to-door, delivering brochures that informed citizens about the township's efforts to respond to the opioid epidemic.

Colerain's QRT members were trained to use "motivational interviewing" principles – expression of empathy to build rapport with the opiate user, helping the user to elicit the pros and cons of entering treatment, respecting the user's right to choose, and communicating to the user their capability to change – during their post-incident follow-ups with overdose victims, to attempt to divert users into addiction treatment programs.

They were also trained to identify barriers to treatment, to assist users and their families in preparing to remove or overcome those barriers, to move the user toward a firm commitment to action, and to engage the victim's family and enlist its help in moving the victim to action.

Follow-on counseling encounters were directed to be made in a manner that built trust, maintained discretion and confidentiality, protected the individual's right to choose his or her own care, and complied with all state and federal regulations on patient privacy (i.e.., HIPAA).

== Efficacy ==
In January through June 2015 (the 6 months immediately preceding the unit's first deployment), Colerain's first responders made 96 overdose-related emergency runs (19 of which involved associated cardiac arrests). In the 6 months immediately following the QRT units' deployment, the township made 71 overdose-related emergency runs (7 of which involved associated cardiac arrests).

Although those initial, positive indications were not sufficient to conclusively prove the pilot program's effectiveness, they were nonetheless encouraging. A subsequent year-over-year analysis lent support to its developers hypothesis that the QRT program could be effective in reducing the number of overdoses in the community.

In January through June 2016, the township made 67 overdose-related emergency runs (just 6 of which involved associated cardiac arrests), representing just over a 30% reduction in such runs from the same 6-month period in the preceding year.

At 2016's year-end, Colerain Township's Department of Public Safety reported that its QRT units had conducted approximately 250 overdose follow-up encounters since July 2015, when the units were first deployed, and that nearly 80% of the users counseled by the unit had entered substance abuse treatment.

Nearby Middletown, Ohio's QRT arguably did not succeed in reducing overdose rates or overdose-related deaths in its first year of operation.

Interviewed by the Journal-News, Middletown's fire chief, Paul Lolli, noted that in 2016 (the year its QRT was implemented), the city's emergency response agencies made 532 overdose-related runs (comprising 5.7% of its total response volume for that year) with 74 deaths recorded. But, from January 1 – June 17, 2017, the city's agencies had already made 577 opioid overdose responses (comprising 12.4% of its EMS run volume to that point in the year) with 51 recorded deaths.

In 2017, Lucas County sheriff John Tharp stated that that county's DART program had, in the 3 years since its first deployment, achieved a similar success rate, with 74% of contacted individuals having either entered detox or connected with other substance abuse treatment programs.

== Proliferation ==
The Colerain QRT's initial successes in addressing that township's opiate abuse epidemic garnered close attention from officials in surrounding communities, many of which expressed interest in adopting the model. Within the QRT's first 2 years of operation, communities in North Carolina, northern Ohio, Texas and West Virginia contacted Colerain to inquire about its program.

By June 2016, Ross County, Ohio, and its seat, Chillicothe, had launched their joint, multi-agency Post-Overdose Response Team (PORT), based on Colerain's QRT.

In August 2016, Oxford, Ohio, in Butler County, had "loosely" formed a QRT.

By September 2016, another Cincinnati suburb, Norwood, had developed and deployed a Colerain-model QRT.

In January 2017, the Funders' Response to the Heroin Epidemic – a Greater Cincinnati-based, private funding collaboration operated by InterAct for Change, a nonprofit subsidiary of Interact for Health — awarded both Colerain Township and Clermont County, Ohio, $100,000 grants to support (respectively) their QRT operational and development efforts. Both grants were to be paid over 3 years.

By March 8, 2017, two other Tristate communities — Lawrenceburg, Indiana and Kenton County, Kentucky – had developed and launched their own versions of the QRT program.

In contrast to the Colerain model, Kenton County's QRT – developed by Kenton County Police Department chief Spike Jones and Independence (Ky.) Fire District chief Scott Breeze – was operated by part-time staffers. Unlike Colerain's QRT members, who are full-time employees but also pull normal fire/EMS, police patrol or special tactics team duty, Kenton County's part-time staffers are not responsible for non-QRT duties.

Middletown, Ohio, implemented its QRT program in 2016; the city's fire chief, Paul Lolli, reported that 92% of users contacted by the unit had "been able to enter treatment," although he acknowledged that the program had not recorded the results experienced by those who entered treatment, rendering the program's efficacy unclear.

In June 2017, citing opiate addiction as his community's "No. 1 public safety issue," Boone County, Ky., Judge-Executive Gary Moore announced that county's launch of its own Colerain-inspired overdose response team.

By July 2017, several other Ohio communities – including Colerain-neighboring Green Township, the cities of Cincinnati, Cleveland, Hamilton, Mansfield, Oxford and Troy, and Logan and Richland Counties – had developed and implemented QRT programs.

Summit County developed its QRT in partnership with the non-profit drug abuse education and prevention organization Cover2 Resources, with significant advisory support from Colerain Township's Meloy. The county deployed QRT units in Akron, Barberton, Coventry, Cuyahoga Falls, Green, Hudson, Munroe Falls, Norton, Stow and Tallmadge, under partnership agreements with those communities.

Indianapolis and Raleigh had also deployed QRT units as of July 2017.

In June 2017, Butler County Mental Health and Addiction Recovery Services received a $660,000 federal grant, funded by provisions of the 21st Century Cures Act, to develop a mobile overdose response program in that Southwestern Ohio locality.

Also in June 2017, Ohio Governor John Kasich signed into law a state budget that allotted $3 million in grant funding to assist Ohio communities in developing their own QRT or DART programs. The grants were to be administered by the Ohio Attorney General's Office and the initial application period was set to begin in mid-July 2017.

In September 2017, Ohio Attorney General Mike DeWine announced that QRT/DART development grants had been awarded to 40 Ohio law enforcement agencies and their partner organizations.

Hancock County received $87,500 and, by the end of the year, its QRT was operational; Ottawa and Wood Counties also received funding. The Mahoning County Sheriff's Office was awarded a $150,000 grant to develop a county-wide QRT program. The Newton Falls Police Department in Trumbull County and the East Liverpool Police Department in Columbiana County each received $50,000 grants.

Tuscarawas County was another of the first communities to receive an Ohio QRT/DART development grant; its sheriff's department was awarded $83,500 to start a county-wide, multi-agency program, which became operational in mid-October 2017.

In December 2017, Meloy resigned from his role as Colerain Township administrator to become an addiction services consultant, helping other communities to start their own QRT programs.

In late December 2017, Huntington, West Virginia, announced that it had developed and implemented a QRT program based on Colerain's model. The city funded its QRT unit through two, 3-year grants: $300,000 from the US Department of Justice and $1.05 million from the US Department of Health & Human Services.

In 2018, following on Huntington's successful QRT implementation, the West Virginia Department of Health and Human Resources (DHHR) awarded an addiction services provider, the Prestera Center, a $263,000 grant to develop a similar overdose intervention program in the Kanawha Valley. DHHR Secretary Bill J. Crouch told West Virginia Public Broadcasting that funding QRTs is "essential part of the DHHR's state opioid response plan," adding that his agency's goal was to, "expand the effort until there's a QRT in every major city in West Virginia."

Also in 2018, Pittsburgh and its surrounding communities began developing their own QRT-inspired, multi-agency response program – the Post Overdose Response Team (POST) — funded in part by the University of Pittsburgh (Pitt) Center for Emergency Medicine of Western Pennsylvania via a $150,000 grant from the Pennsylvania Commission on Crime and Delinquency. The Congress of Neighboring Communities (CONNECT) — a Pitt-based project that develops programs to address problems shared by Pittsburgh and its several dozen suburbs – will supply community medics and has indicated it will hire a peer recovery specialist to staff the team. Police officers will be provided by the city of Pittsburgh.

In April 2018, the Morgan County, Oh. Sheriff's Department announced that it would begin participating in a county-wide QRT partnership with Morgan Behavioral Health Choices, Allwell Behavioral Health Choices and the Muskingham Area Mental Health and Recovery Services Board.

== Recognition ==
On June 2, 2017, at its board's annual luncheon, Meloy was presented with the Hamilton County Mental Health and Recovery Services Board's 2017 Leadership Award.

In 2017, Meloy was also honored by the Greater Cincinnati chapter of the American Society for Public Administration (ASPA) for his work in developing Colerain's QRT program. Colerain Township itself received ASPA's Cincinnatus Government Cooperation Award (sponsored by the Cincinnatus Association) for its successful deployment of the QRT model.

On June 11, 2018, Mueller and Colerain's Dept. of Fire & EMS accepted the Ohio Association of County Behavioral Health Authorities' 2018 CARES Award at Ohio's 2018 Opiate Conference.

On June 9, 2018, during the United States Conference of Mayors’ 86th Annual Meeting in Boston, the City of Huntington, W.V. and its mayor, Steve Williams, received the City Livability Awards Program "Outstanding Achievement" honor for the successful deployment of its QRT. First given in 1979, City Livability Awards honor, "mayors and their city governments for developing programs that enhance the quality of life in urban areas," and "are given annually to ten mayors and their cities," according to the Conference's website.

== See also ==
- Addiction recovery
- Paramedicine
- Community medicine
- Community policing
- Narcotic abuse
- Opioid epidemic
- Social determinants of health
- Intervention (counseling)
