= UPMC Altoona =

- University of Pittsburgh Medical Center

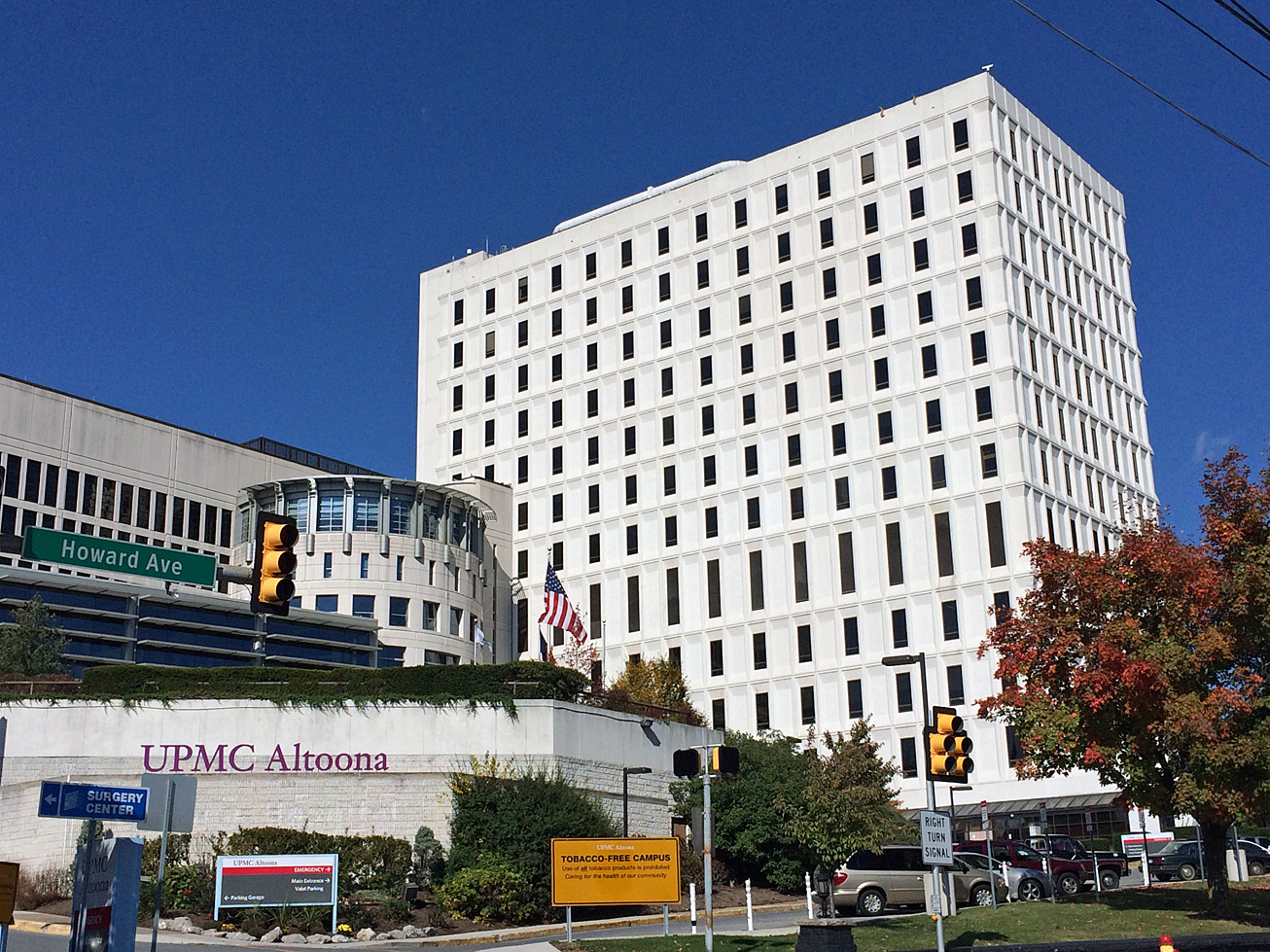
- UPMC Altoona in Altoona, Pennsylvania

- Location of UPMC Altoona in Pennsylvania

Geography
- Location: 620 Howard Avenue, Altoona, Pennsylvania, U.S.
- Coordinates: 40.521951°N 78.398833°W

Organisation
- Care system: Private
- Type: Community

Services
- Emergency department: Level III trauma
- Beds: 380

Helipads
- Helipad: FAA LID: 74PN
Number	Length		Surface
Number	ft	m	Surface
H1	65	20	Asphalt
H2	44	13	Roof/Top

History
- Founded: 1883

Links
- Website: http://upmcaltoona.org

UPMC Altoona, located in downtown Altoona, Pennsylvania, is a 380-bed, non-profit, private community hospital system that contains more than 20 affiliated health care companies and functions as the regional referral center and tertiary hub of the University of Pittsburgh Medical Center (UPMC). Founded in 1883 as to serve the needs of the area and the Pennsylvania Railroad, the hospital was known for most of its history simply as Altoona Hospital (a name still used by locals in informal discussion). It became part of the Altoona Regional Health System which was created in 2004 by the merger of Altoona Hospital with Bon Secours-Holy Family Hospital, previously Mercy Hospital of Altoona. As part of UPMC since 2013 and a level II trauma center until 2024, it is a level III trauma center and is served by 300 physicians and 4,000 care givers that help it to provide a variety of medical services and specialties.

UPMC Altoona is the tallest building in Altoona.

== History ==
Prior to becoming part of the UPMC system, UPMC Altoona was known as the Altoona Regional Health System, of which Altoona Regional Hospital was the flagship facility and campus. That health system was the product of a 2004 merger between the city's two historic hospitals, Altoona Hospital and Mercy Hospital, the later of which became known as Bon Secours Holy Family Hospital in 1996.

=== Altoona Hospital ===
Altoona Hospital was founded as Altoona General Hospital in 1883 due to the needs for a medical facility for the growing population of Blair County and the Pennsylvania Rail Road (PRR), which had its primary repair shops located in the area. Altoona Hospital's earliest permanent home was a $16,645 ($596,446 in 2025 dollars) wooden, two-story, 30-bed hospital that opened on January 1, 1886. The first medical staff, led by Dr. John Fay as chief, were appointed on November 11, 1885. The PRR donated the land for the hospital, located conveniently close to the rail lines between 6th and 7th streets along Howard Avenue. During this first year, the hospital saw 113 total patients and ambulance service was added in July 1886.

The hospital grew rapidly in size, including the addition of two stories by 1893, and added greatly to its capabilities. In 1904, it opened a nursing school, a nurses residence in 1905, a dispensary in 1920, an intensive-care unit in 1957, and the area's first cardiac care unit in 1968. Altoona Hospital constructed its current 13-story main tower, designed by Hayes Large Architects of Altoona, in 1978 and in 1989 it performed the region's first open heart surgery. Between 1993 and 1995, it constructed a major expansion with the addition of a 7-story outpatient center and a 5-story parking garage, also by Hayes Large Architects, with Robert E. Wedge, AIA, as Principle in Charge.

=== Mercy/Bon Secours hospital ===
Mercy Hospital, also in Altoona, was conceived under the name of Mountain City Hospital to serve as a second hospital for the city. Mercy was formally opened on July 14, 1910, with nine beds, 15 physicians and 6 nurses in what was originally the 1866 home of Thomas McCaulley which was located on the corner of Eighth Avenue and Twenty-sixth Street of Altoona. Mercy also operated a school of nursing and by 1927 the hospital had grown to 180 beds. In 1935, while facing financial difficulties and at the request of the hospital's board of directors, Mercy came to be managed by the Sisters of the Holy Family of Nazareth of Pittsburgh. From that point the hospital experienced major expansions of its facilities, including a "B" wing that opened in 1962, a pavilion that opened in 1978, and another expansion 1991. Its school of nursing closed in 1985 and the hospital instead affiliated with a nursing program located at nearby Saint Francis College. In 1996, the Sisters of the Holy Family of Nazareth sold the hospital to the Sisters of Bon Secours, at which point it became part of the multi-state Bon Secours Health System and changed its name to Bon Secours Holy Family Hospital. In 2003, the Sisters of the Bon Secours withdrew their sponsorship of the hospital (although the hospital remained as a part of Bon Secours Health System) as merger talks with Altoona Hospital began to take shape.

Logo of Altoona Regional Health System prior to the takeover by UPMC

The 2004 merger between Altoona Hospital and Bon Secours resulted in a two hospital campus system that included more than 20 affiliated companies. In 2010 and 2011, some outpatient services were moved to a new $16 million Station Medical Center and additional expansion of the Altoona Hospital campus was initiated by the purchase and $18 million renovation of the formerly state-owned Altoona Center at Howard Avenue and 4th Street. In 2011, with a decision having been made to close the Bon Secours campus and consolidate existing services at the Altoona Hospital, Bon Secours Health System withdrew as a partner of Altoona Regional Health System thereby ending 76 years of Catholic involvement in area hospital administration. The 7th Avenue Bons Secours campus officially closed on March 28, 2012.

=== UPMC ===
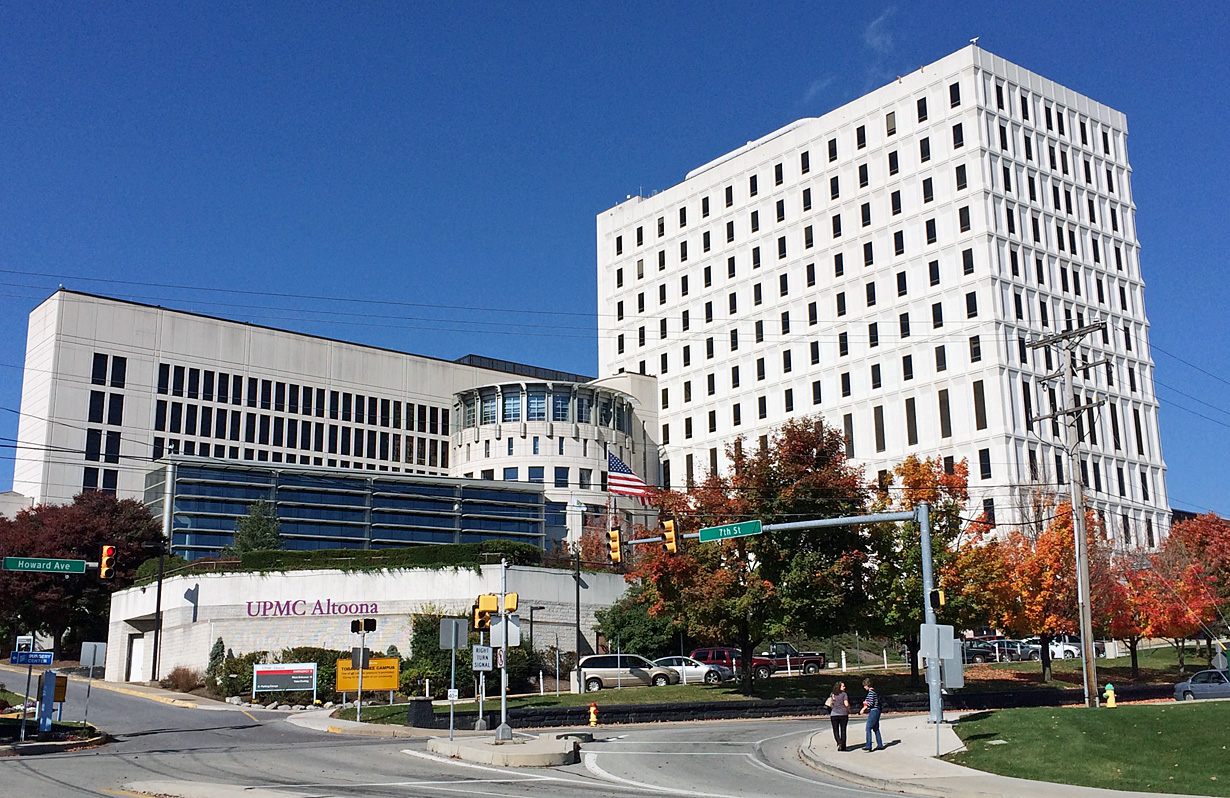
UPMC Altoona campus in 2014

In February 2013, after over a year-long investigation of affiliation options, Altoona Regional Health System signed a non-binding letter of intent to negotiate an affiliation with the University of Pittsburgh Medical Center (UPMC). Altoona Regional is simultaneously exploring affiliation with 45-bed Nason Hospital in Roaring Spring, Pennsylvania in order to form a single, county-wide health system. In its final action on affiliation, on June 20, 2013, the boards of directors of Altoona Regional Health System and its parent company, Central Pennsylvania Health Services Corporation, voted unanimously to join with UPMC on July 1, 2013, as the renamed "UPMC Altoona", which will become a regional referral center of the UPMC health system. With the merger, UPMC will appoint one-third of the hospital's board members as well as commit $250 million over the next decade for capital improvement in the Altoona system, not including a $10 million donation to the hospital's charitable foundation.

In September 2024, UPMC Altoona's trauma rating dropped from level II to level III.

== Services ==
UPMC Altoona is a private, non-profit hospital that functions as a regional referral center and tertiary hub for UPMC. It serves as an Adult Level III trauma center for a 20 county region in central Pennsylvania. Altoona Regional is serviced by the STAT Medevac medical air transport service. UPMC Altoona hosts the Altoona Family Physicians Residency training program.

Medical services offered by UPMC Altoona include:

Behavioral Health
Black Lung Program
Birth & Growth (Maternity)
Breast Health Cancer Care
Cardiac Care
Center for Weight Loss and Bariatric Surgery

Emergency Medicine
HealthForce (Occupational Medicine)
Imaging Services
Institute for Sleep Medicine
Neurosurgery
Orthopedics

Plastic and Reconstructive Surgery Physical Medicine and Rehabilitation
Primary Care Walk-in
Primary Stroke Center
Surgical Services
Telemedicine
Trauma Service
Wound Care and Ostomy Program

The UPMC Altoona Hospital campus also contains the Glover Memorial Library, which is available to provide health-related information to patients and the community.
