= York Airport (Pennsylvania) =

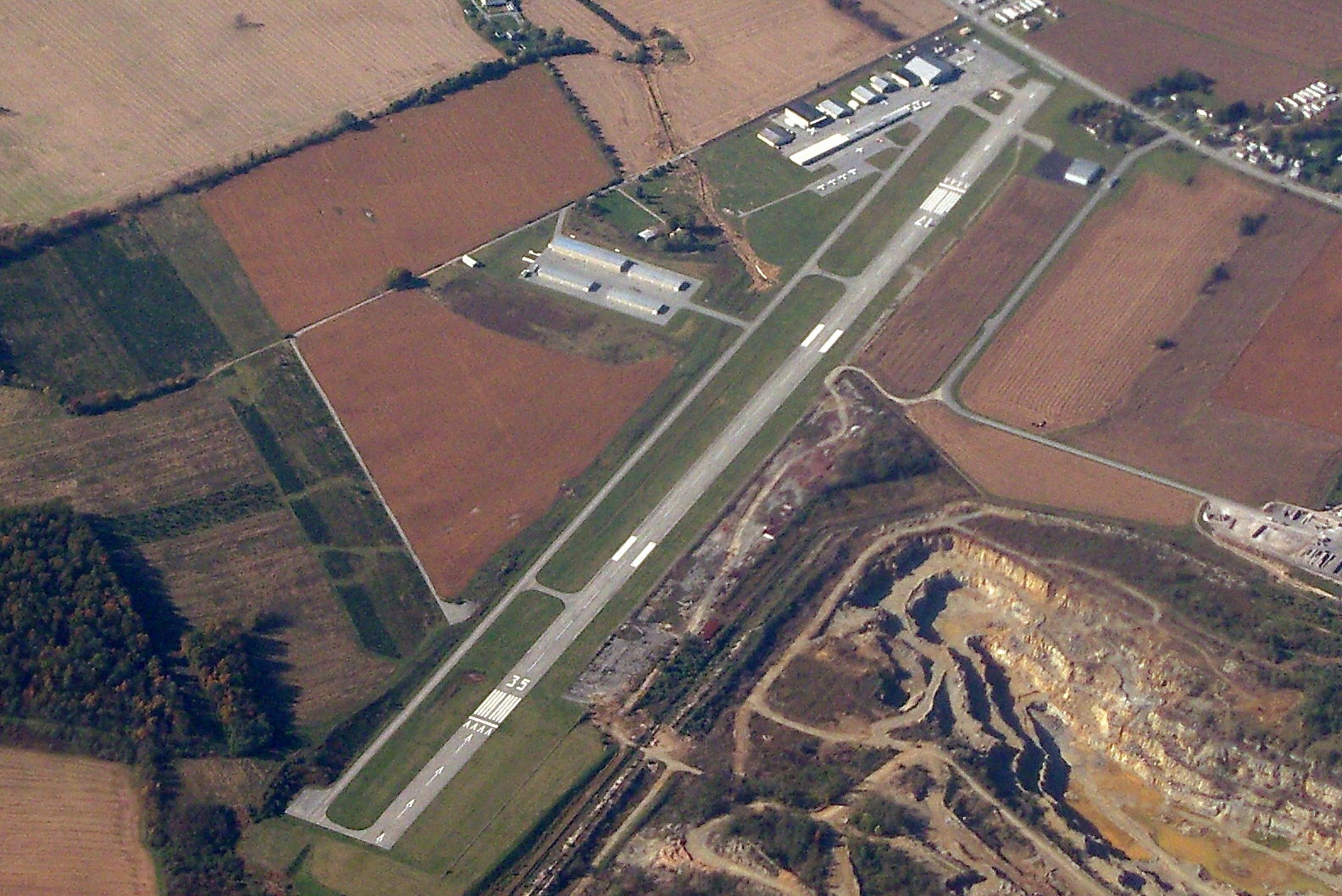
- IATA: THV; ICAO: KTHV; FAA LID: THV

Summary
- Airport type: Public use
- Owner: York Aviation
- Serves: York, Pennsylvania
- Location: Thomasville, Jackson Township, York County, Pennsylvania
- Elevation AMSL: 495 ft (151 m)
- Coordinates: 39°55′01″N 076°52′23″W

Map
- Location of airport in Pennsylvania THV (the United States)

Runways
Direction	Length		Surface
Direction	ft	m	Surface
17/35	5,188	1,581	Asphalt

Statistics (2011)
- Aircraft operations: 50,800
- Based aircraft: 82
- Source: Federal Aviation Administration

York Airport (York Aviation) (IATA: THV, ICAO: KTHV, FAA LID: THV) is a privately owned, public use airport that is located seven nautical miles (8 mi, 13 km) southwest of the central business district of York in the Thomasville section of Jackson Township, York County, Pennsylvania, United States.

The airport is owned and operated by York Aviation.

== History ==
This airport is the second to bear this name. The first, which this one replaced when it closed sometime between 1953 and 1957, was located near the intersection of Roosevelt Avenue and Wood Street in York, Pennsylvania.

== Facilities and aircraft ==
York Airport covers an area of sixty-six acres (27 ha) at an elevation of 495 feet (151 m) above mean sea level. It has one runway designated 17/35 with an asphalt surface measuring 5,188 by 100 feet (1,581 x 30 m). The airport has several instrument approaches, including a GPS approach to each runway.

For the twelve-month period ending December 9, 2011, the airport had 50,800 aircraft operations, an average of 139 per day: 96% general aviation, 3% air taxi, and 1% military. At that time there were eighty-two aircraft based at this airport: 76.8% single-engine, 15% multi-engine, 6% helicopter, and 2% jet.

For the twelve-month period ending Feb 26, 2021, the airport had 52,750 aircraft operations, an average of 144 per day: 31,400 local general aviation, 20,000 transient general aviation, 1,050 air taxi, and 300 military. There were sixty-eight aircraft based at the airport: fifty-six single-engine, five multi-engine, five jet, and two helicopters.

A restaurant named Orville's operated on the field until November, 2008 when it was closed.

A restaurant, known as the Kitty Hawk, took Orville's place and catered to both airborne (fly in) and terrestrial (drive up) patrons. This restaurant closed circa 2013; the space is currently empty.

York Airport offers flight lessons which are operated by York Flight Training LLC with four Instrument Flight Rules (IFR) equipped Cessna 172 aircraft.

The airport is also the home of the York Squadron of Civil Air Patrol. Squadron 301 is the oldest continuously active composite squadron in the world.

== EMS Operations ==
York airport is home to helicopter EMS operations from UPMC-owned STAT MedEvac.

STAT MedEvac, an air medevac agency, operates its thirteenth base out of the York Airport as STAT MedEvac 13. This unit provides emergency and scheduled Critical Care Transport (CCT) services to the region.

== See also ==
- List of airports in Pennsylvania
