= Byrd Brown =

Byrd Rowlett Brown
- Born: July 26, 1929 (Note: sources vary on actual birth date); Pittsburgh, Pennsylvania
- Died: May 3, 2001 (aged 71). Pittsburgh, Pennsylvania
- Education: Yale University (BA, JD)
- Occupation: Attorney
- Movement: Civil Rights Movement
- Spouse: Barbara Brown
- Children: 2

Byrd Rowlett Brown (July 26, 1929 – May 3, 2001) was an American activist, lawyer, and leader in the American Civil Rights Movement. He is best known for improving life for Pittsburgh's African Americans and the poor through his long terms as president of the Pittsburgh Branch of the NAACP and his legal and civil work. He led a march on Duquesne Light to protest unfair hiring practices. This work resulted in the creation of training programs for African-Americans so that they could gain admission into trade unions. He ran for Congress in 1970 and mayor of Pittsburgh in 1989.

== Early life and education ==
Byrd Rowlett Brown was born on July 26, 1929, though sources dispute his actual birthday. Brown was the only child of the prominent Wilhelmina Byrd Brown, a civil rights activist, and Homer S. Brown, Allegheny County's first black judge, and the founder and first president of the Pittsburgh NAACP, who served as president for 24 years, 1958–71. Byrd's mother, Wilhelmina Byrd Brown, dedicated 50 years of her life to public service. His grandfather, the Reverend William Roderick Brown, was a well-known Pittsburgh North Side preacher. Byrd's father, Homer Brown, was a member of the Pennsylvania legislature and wrote the Pennsylvania state Fair Employment Practices Act. Homor Brown created one of the first pieces of legislation in Pennsylvania that prohibited discrimination in public places. At that time, nine out of ten firms discriminated against race, religion, or national origin in the hiring of workers.

Byrd Brown was raised in the affluent neighborhood called Sugar Top, in the Hill District of Pittsburgh. This district historically served as the center of African-American life in Pittsburgh in Allegheny County. The quality of life in the Hill and other Pittsburgh neighborhoods has been improved by redevelopment. But this progress often has been at the expense of African-Americans, forced out of their neighborhoods by inflating property values, redlining and other practices that promote gentrification.

Brown was the first black student to start as quarterback for his high school football team. He graduated from Schenley High School in 1947, and went on to earn a Bachelor of Arts degree (BA) and a Juris Doctor (JD) from Yale Law School in 1955. His Yale contemporaries included George H. W. Bush, William F. Buckley, and Pat Robertson. Brown served in the United States Army from 1954 to 1956.

== Civil rights activism ==
Byrd Brown was a leader in the Civil Rights Movement and contemporary of the Rev. Dr. Martin Luther King Jr. Mayor Tom Murphy of Pittsburgh said, "Byrd Brown was an African-American who stood in the front lines of the civil rights movement and faced down enormous hatred and prejudice. It takes a rare kind of courage to be able to do that."

=== Events organized ===
In the 1960s Brown helped to organize rallies at Forbes Field where King spoke.

In 1963 he helped lead a train convoy to the March on Washington.

In 1967 Brown organized and led a downtown march of 5,000 people at the company Duquesne Light to seek better jobs and protesting unfair hiring practices for African Americans. After the march, Duquesne Light began hiring African American workers.

In 1968, Brown acted as co-chairman of the Spring Mobilization for Peace.

In 1969 he became the principal speaker at Moratorium Day rally at Point Park in Pittsburgh.

Brown also organized marches against Mine Safety Appliances, Gimbels, Kaufmann's, Hornes, the Pittsburgh Board of Education, Sears Roebuck, and the University of Pittsburgh. He picketed construction sites to push for more black jobs in construction. During one violent police confrontation, Brown suffered beatings and was sprayed with mace. Thanks to the efforts of Brown and other civil rights activists, the Pittsburgh Plan was produced. This plan was considered a national model for training blacks for construction jobs.

==== Black Monday ====
Byrd helped organize the Black Monday demonstration to U.S. Steel corporation's new building to protest discrimination in construction.

=== NAACP ===
Brown was president of the Pittsburgh NAACP from 1958 to 1971.

=== Pro bono and philanthropy work ===
Brown donated regularly and generously to a non-profit organization called Hand in Hand that gave college scholarships. City Councilman Sala Udin recalled the time while they were driving back to Pittsburgh from Mississippi in the 1960s the police stopped him and fellow civil rights workers. Officers arrested Udin and the others after they searched their car and found a pistol. Udin called Brown while stuck in jail. "Byrd came to Kentucky and got us out of jail," Udin said Brown donated generously to college scholarships and non-profit organizations that assisted the poor and less fortunate. For instance, in the 1970s, when Warner Cable came to Pittsburgh, Brown arranged for local charities to receive company stock. According to the Reverend Leroy Patrick, pastor emeritus of Bethesda Presbyterian Church, his church received $300,000 for its stock when Warner Cable was later bought out.

==== Litigation ====
Former NAACP president Harvey Adams said of Brown, "Pro bono was his middle name," "He did a thorough job whether the client had a nickel or nothing. He made them work to put a person in jail." Brown filed successful civil rights litigation challenging perpetual racism in housing from the local Board of Realtors and represented Oswald Nickens, a black gynecologist who was prevented from buying a piece of property in Stanton Heights until his lawsuit.

== Politics and later life ==
In 1970 Brown ran for the United States Congress, and in 1989 he ran for mayor of Pittsburgh. "run as a citizen and as a black man-in that order." He ran for mayor on the slogan "Byrd is the word." In 1991, Brown faced William Bradford Reynolds, a former U.S. Attorney General in a debate about affirmative action. Brown argued against Reynolds that affirmative action is "the kind of code word that is always used to keep [African Americans] in [their] place" and so it is no more discriminative than other active legislation.

== Awards and honors ==
In 1989 Brown was awarded the Yale Club of Pittsburgh Distinguished Alumni Award which honors those who have helped to improve their community. This award had only been given to one person before Brown received it.

In 1991, Brown gave the keynote address for the Alle-Kisi memorial service for Martin Luther King Jr.

Byrd Brown received the Drum Major for Justice Award from the Homer S. Brown Law Association in 2000 in honor of his civil rights activism. The association's president, Carl G. Cooper, said at a prayer breakfast at East Liberty's Mt. Ararat Baptist Church, "Byrd has fought (for civil rights) courageously and often single-handedly," "He is a hero in this corner of the world."

Brown owned a private law practice in downtown Pittsburgh which was among the first black-owned businesses in the area. Brown was recognized in 1995 by the Allegheny Bar Association and by the Homer S. Brown Law Association for being one of the first 40 African American lawyers in the United States.

In 2011, Brown was posthumously given the Spirit of King Award. "The Spirit of King Award celebrates the life of Dr. Martin Luther King Jr. and honors those who have carried his legacy throughout their lives," said Eric Wells, assistant director, Employee Relations/OEO department of Port Authority. Brown shared King's spirit of dedication and perseverance throughout his life to achieve freedom and equality. This award honored Brown's impact on the region and the community, but it also gave an opportunity to show appreciation "for the sacrifices made in the past as a reminder for us to work together and continue the movement in the present, as well as the future," said Chaz Kellum, Manager of Diversity Initiatives for the Pittsburgh Pirates.

== Memberships ==
Byrd Brown a member of the NAACP, Pittsburgh chapter, as well as its president from 1958 to 1971. He was a board member of the Pittsburgh Foundation; and a chair of the Freedom Unlimited as well as chair of the Health Advisory Council of Community Action Pittsburgh (CAP).

== Death ==
Byrd Brown died on May 3, 2001, at UPMC Presbyterian hospital. His cause of death was from emphysema and complications from a lung transplant.
