= Quick response team =

Quick response team (QRT) may refer to:

- Police tactical unit (PTU), also called quick response team
  - Anne Arundel County Police Department Quick Response Team
  - Quick Response Team of the Maharashtra Police
  - Mumbai Police Quick Response Team
  - Quick Response Team of the Pune Police
- Counter-terrorism response unit
  - SOBR: the Special Unit of Quick Response, a spetsnaz unit of the National Guard of Russia
- Quick reaction force teams from the military
- Rapid reaction force teams from the military
- Drug abuse response team (DART), also called quick response team
- Rapid response team (medicine)
- News TV Quick Response Team, a Philippine television news broadcasting show broadcast by GMA
- National Weather Service Quick Response Team for surveying tornado damage
