= Center for Emergency Medicine of Western Pennsylvania =

Multi-hospital consortium in Pennsylvania, US

Coordinates: 40.439272°N 79.958806°W

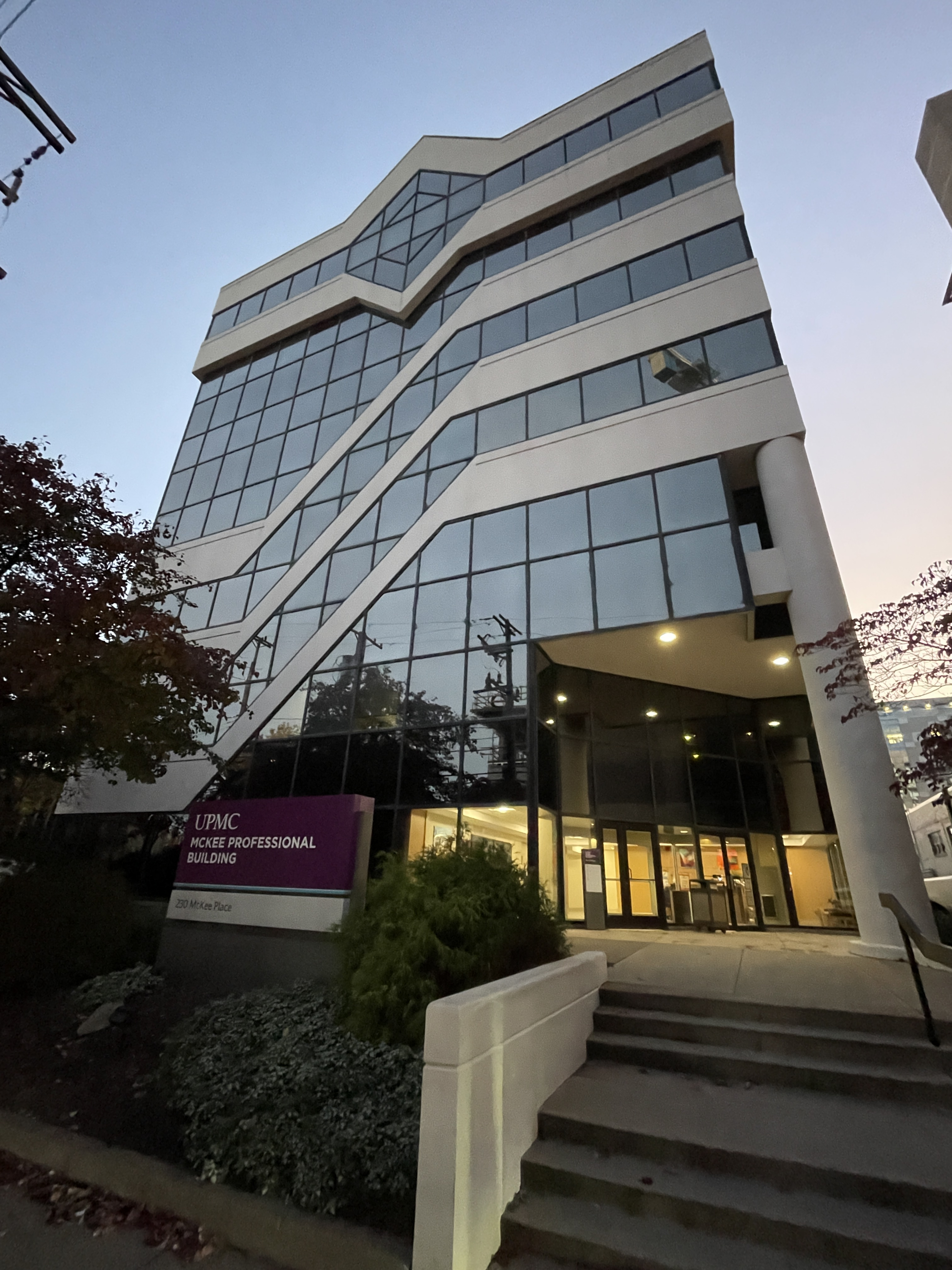
McKee Professional Building, which houses the Center for Emergency Medicine of Western Pennsylvania and the University of Pittsburgh Medical Center's photo studio

The Center for Emergency Medicine of Western Pennsylvania is a multi-hospital consortium based in Pittsburgh, Pennsylvania. It is claimed to be one of the world's premiere centers of Emergency Medicine and EMS development. It currently ranks sixth for residencies in emergency medicine by reputation.

Currently, the center's member hospitals include the University of Pittsburgh Medical Center Presbyterian and Shadyside hospitals, UPMC Children's Hospital of Pittsburgh, and UPMC Mercy. The "Center" as it is known, has several distinct offices:

== The Office of Education ==
The Office of Education provides Paramedic and EMT training to providers in Western Pennsylvania. It also has trained students from around the world, including students from Iceland, Ireland, Canada, New Zealand, Qatar and Saudi Arabia. The office also has an active international section, and is actively involved with the development of emergency medicine around the world. It serves as a home to the University of Pittsburgh fellowship in international emergency medicine as well as a physical home for the University of Pittsburgh School of Health and Rehabilitative Sciences' Emergency Medicine program. Office Of Education website

== STAT MedEvac ==
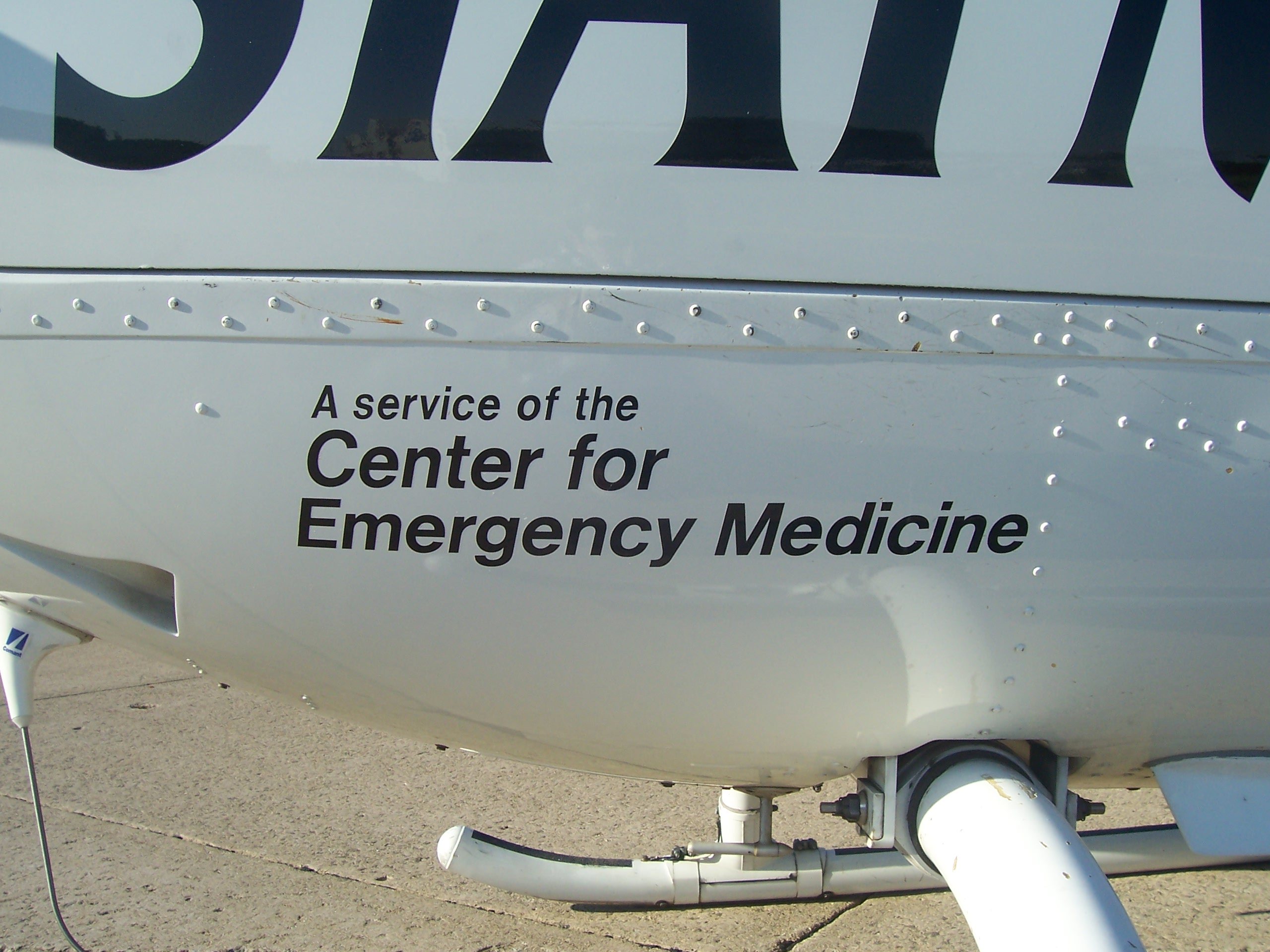
The Pilot's side fuselage of a STAT MedEvac helicopter.

STAT MedEvac is among the largest aeromedical agencies in the United States, with 17 helicopters based in Pennsylvania, Ohio, Washington D.C., and Maryland - serving those states, the southern tier of New York State and West Virginia. Its main dispatch center is in Pittsburgh at UPMC Presbyterian Hospital. As of an early 2018 Commonwealth of Pennsylvania Department of Health EMS Protocol expansion allowing for critical care ground units to be licensed, STAT MedEvac now operates 4 Critical Care ground ambulances, and a new CEM STAT MedEvac and Children's Hospital of Pittsburgh of UPMC Neonatal Critical Care ground ambulance and neonate critical care program. STAT MedEvac website

== The Office of Research ==
The Center for Research on Emergency Medicine, Emergency Medical Services and Prehospital Care is the nation's leader in the research of Emergency Medical Service (EMS). Their mission is to promote state-of-the-art research on Prehospital Care, educational practices and resuscitation. The Center for Research works in partnership with the University of Pittsburgh Department of Emergency Medicine. Office of Research website

== CONNECT Community Paramedic Program ==
Focuses on health promotion activities in Emergency Departments, and provides community paramedicine services using Community Paramedics. It is a leader in this emerging area of Community Paramedicine. CONNECT Program website

== STAT-MD ==
The center as of 2017 also now operates STAT-MD, which provides airline consultation services. Services such as pilot pre-flight physical screening, in-flight patient consult via STATCOMM at UPMC Presbyterian, ground EMS arrangements and passenger follow up, assistance with training, manuals and on site instruction, Medical Director review of Airline Emergency Medical kits. All physicians are residency trained and Board Certified in Emergency Medicine. Many are Subspecialty Board Certified in Emergency Medical Services. STAT-MD is fully backed by UPMC. STAT-MD website

== WISER (Peter M. Winter Institute for Simulation, Education, and Research) ==
WISER is not directly connected to the center, but is affiliated with the center as well as shares a physical home with the center on a separate floor. WISER is "Part of the UPMC commitment to patient safety." WISER was founded by Dr. Peter Winter, the Chair of Anesthesia and Critical Care Medicine at the University of Pittsburgh and is considered to be one of the founders of simulations in medicine, as well as a pioneer in patient safety. In the early 1990s, Dr. Winter, as Chairman of the Department of Anesthesiology and Critical Care Medicine, realized the importance of establishing a simulation center for training Department personnel. The simulator obtained for this purpose, essentially the only one available at the time, came at the high cost of over $250,000. The Department obtained computers and other additional equipment, and in 1994 the center was launched on the third floor of Montefiore University Hospital, now UPMC Montefiore. Dr. Paul Phrampus, of the Departments of Anesthesia and Emergency Medicine, known always as "the guy that was on stage crew in highschool", loved Winter's idea, and joined Winter in his fight for funding and office space. Arrangements were made to simulate an operating room, an ICU bed, or a bay in the emergency department. Anesthesia machines, monitors, and ventilators completed the picture. Over the next four years, a number of faculty members worked to develop a broad range of curricula, using performance evaluations including Internet, CD-ROM, Palm-based, and digital video-based components. In 1996, Drs. Renæ Gonzales (director from 1994 to 1996) and John Schaefer (director 1996 - 2005) designed and patented a difficult-airway simulator that was more functional, affordable, and portable than the full-sized version. A Texas company, Medical Plastics Laboratory, later acquired by the Laerdal Corporation, undertook commercial manufacture of this new simulator (AirMan) that has also been incorporated into a "full-scale" human simulator (SimMan).

It is said that Dr. Winter got his idea in the late 1990s for simulating the clinical setting for not only medical students at the University, but also for providers to practice complicated, high-risk and dangerous procedures in a simulated clinical setting, before actually treating the patient from flight simulators in the aviation industry.

WISER has a classroom dedicated in honor of Tore Laederal, and the research and work that he and his father Asmund's Laederal Corporation have done, inventing, designing and building a majority the simulation equipment and technology that made WISER possible.
