= UPMC Presbyterian =

- University of Pittsburgh Medical Center

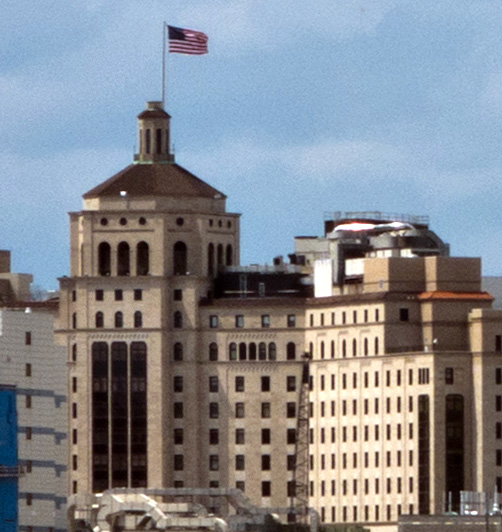
- UPMC's flagship facility, UPMC Presbyterian

Geography
- Location: 200 Lothrop Street, Pittsburgh, Pennsylvania, United States
- Coordinates: 40°26′34″N 79°57′39″W

Organization
- Type: Teaching
- Affiliated university: University of Pittsburgh School of Medicine

Services
- Emergency department: Level 1 Trauma Center
- Beds: 900
- Speciality: Teaching

Helipads
- Helipad: FAA LID: PS78
Number	Length		Surface
Number	ft	m	Surface
1	45 x 55	14 × 17	concrete

History
- Former names: Presbyterian-University Hospital; Presbyterian University Hospital; Presbyterian Hospital
- Constructed: 1930
- Opened: 1893

Links
- Website: UPMC Presbyterian Website
- Lists: Hospitals in Pennsylvania

UPMC Presbyterian (often referred to locally as Presby) is a 900-bed non-profit research and academic hospital located in the Oakland neighborhood of Pittsburgh, Pennsylvania, providing tertiary care for the Western Pennsylvania region and beyond. It comprises the Presbyterian campus of the combined UPMC Presbyterian Shadyside hospital entity. The medical center is a part of the University of Pittsburgh Medical Center health system and is the flagship hospital of the system. UPMC Presbyterian also features a state verified adult Level 1 Trauma Center, 1 of 3 in Pittsburgh. Although UPMC Presbyterian has no pediatric services, it has the equipment to stabilize and transfer pediatric emergency cases to the nearby UPMC Children's Hospital of Pittsburgh.

UPMC Presbyterian is affiliated with the University of Pittsburgh School of Medicine and is physically conjoined to the medical school's primary facility, Scaife Hall. UPMC Presbyterian is also connected via enclosed pedestrian bridges and tunnels to UPMC Montefiore hospital, UPMC Western Psychiatric Hospital, the Eye & Ear Institute, Falk Clinic, the University of Pittsburgh School of Nursing's Victoria Hall, the University of Pittsburgh's (Pitt) Lothrop Hall student residence, and multiple university biomedical science towers.

Despite the name, UPMC Presbyterian has no affiliation with the Presbyterian Church, aside from the founder being the wife of a Presbyterian minister.

== History ==
=== Origins ===
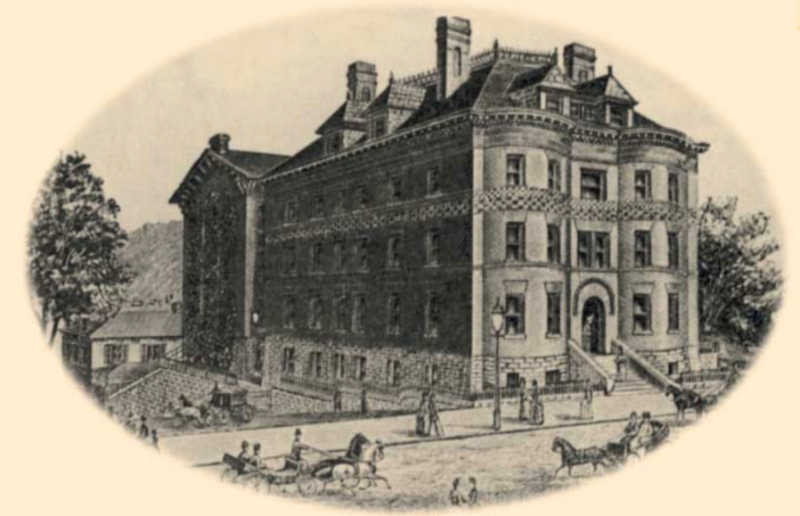
The original building that housed the UPMC Presbyterian Hospital on the north side of Pittsburgh.

UPMC Presbyterian dates back to the early ideas of Louise Wotring Lyle, the wife of a local Presbyterian minister, Joseph Lyle. Lyle had attended medical school years earlier, but failed out due to the prejudice of male administrators. Lyle (along with other prominent females) founded the Women's Medical College of Cincinnati, later graduating with her MD from the college, she returned to Pittsburgh to open up a Presbyterian-based hospital. As Lyle was working with limited funds, she had founded the hospital with only five dollars and a line of credit.

UPMC Presbyterian was founded as Presbyterian Hospital in 1893 by Lyle in what was then the town of Allegheny City, which became the north side of Pittsburgh in 1907, when it was annexed by the city.

In 1910, the hospital moved to a new location near the original. The University of Pittsburgh School of Medicine then worked out informal agreements for teaching and staffing privileges with a number of local hospitals to train their medical students and residents. At the same time, Presbyterian hospital started to go through financial hardships that led to the eventual move to the new hospital funded by the University of Pittsburgh.

=== Oakland ===
In the mid-1920's, the University of Pittsburgh and its School of Medicine desired to establish an academic medical center on their campus, and by the mid-1920s had formed a plan with a coalition of city hospitals to have them relocate to the Oakland neighborhood of the city that the university had itself moved to in 1909. On November 1, 1926, Children's became the first hospital in the Oakland neighborhood on the campus of the University of Pittsburgh, with Presbyterian Hospital making plans to occupy the adjacent site.

The university provided Presbyterian Hospital, then located on the North Side, with a tract of land on its campus for construction of a new hospital which broke ground in 1930 and was subsequently opened in 1938. By the end of the 1930s, the University of Pittsburgh had helped to form the "University Medical Center" which included Falk Clinic, Children's, Eye and Ear, Libby Steele Magee, Presbyterian, and Women's Hospital, as well as the planned Municipal Hospital.

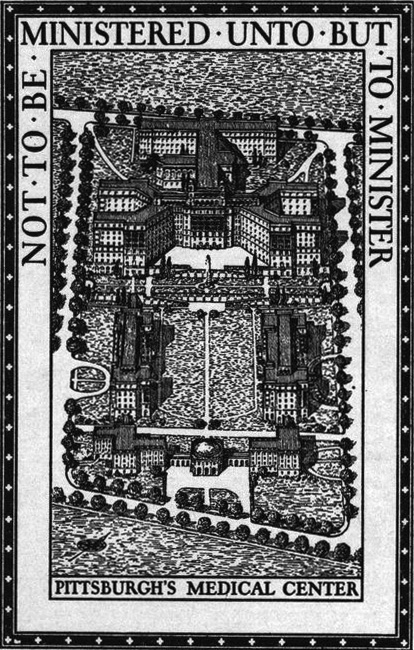
Plan for original university medical center.

Through the years, the university and the hospitals moved toward an ever-tightening alliance. In 1965, the university, Western Psychiatric Institute and Clinic which was managed by the School of Medicine, Presbyterian-University, Magee and Women's, Eye and Ear, and Children's Hospitals incorporated the University Health Center of Pittsburgh (UHCP). In 1969, Montefiore Hospital joined UHCP.

In 1947, Jonas Salk took a job at the University of Pittsburgh as an associate professor of bacteriology and the head of the Virus Research Lab. While at Pitt, he began research on polio and the process of developing a vaccination. In 1952, Salk had created the first Polio vaccination. Salk went on CBS radio to report a successful study on a small group of adults and children and two days later Salk published the results of the study in the Journal of the American Medical Association.

In the 1970s, a new model of administration, in which clinical revenues were invested into research, was implemented at Western Psychiatric under the leadership of Thomas Detre. After guiding the psychiatric institute to become one of the largest recipients of National Institute of Health funding, Detre assumed leadership overseeing all six of the university's schools of health sciences in the early 1980s. Implementing the same administrative model in those units, the collective schools of the health sciences and medical center were ultimately transformed into one of the largest centers for biomedical research in the nation. In the 1970s, the name of the hospital was changed to Presbyterian-University Hospital to reflect the increased academic affiliation.

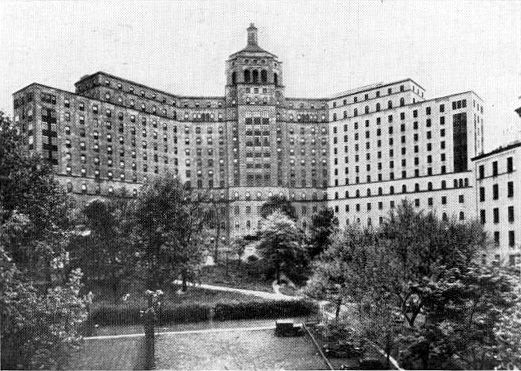
The hospital campus in 1944.

In 1981, pioneering surgeon and "Father of Transplantation", Dr. Thomas E. Starzl came to the hospital, on condition that he would be free of administrative tasks and able to focus on medicine. In a matter of a few years he launched the country's first pediatric and adult liver transplant program. On February 14, 1984, under the direction of Starzl, Drs. Byers W. Shaw Jr. and Henry T. Bahnson successfully completed the world's' first simultaneous heart and liver organ transplant on six-year-old Stormie Jones at the Children's Hospital of Pittsburgh. During his tenure, Starzl also pioneered the use of a new anti-rejection drug called tacrolimus. Starzl was the head of transplantation at the hospital until 1991 when he stepped down from clinical and surgical duties and shifted all of his focus to research.

On September 9, 1984, a story was published by author Andrew Schneider in The Pittsburgh Press criticizing the hospitals' use of unsupervised first and second-year residents in the emergency departments. The article went on to say that these practices were compromising patient care and the education of the residents. A week later, on September 16, The Pittsburgh Press published another article criticizing the original article and claiming that many claims made by Schneider were false or industry standard.

Ground was broken in 1982, and in January 1986 a new tower called the "Main Tower" was opened at the neighboring Children's Hospital of Pittsburgh. The opening was delayed after a slight issue led to a leaking pipe, damaging the lobby at Presbyterian. The Main Tower had a rooftop heliport with connections to UPMC Presbyterian Hospital that were accessed through multiple floors. While the tower belonged to Children's, its radiology department was shared by Children's and Presbyterian Hospital.

In 1986, Presbyterian merged with the nearby Montefiore Hospital to create the University of Pittsburgh Medical Center, later changing the name to UPMC Presbyterian. Under Starzl, by 1988 Presbyterian Hospital had grown to have one of the world's largest transplant programs with more than half of the worlds' transplants taking place at Presbyterian.

In the 1990s, the name of the hospital was changed from Presbyterian-University Hospital to Presbyterian University Hospital because hospital CEO, Jeffrey Romoff wanted a more unified branding after the merger with nearby Montefiore Hospital.

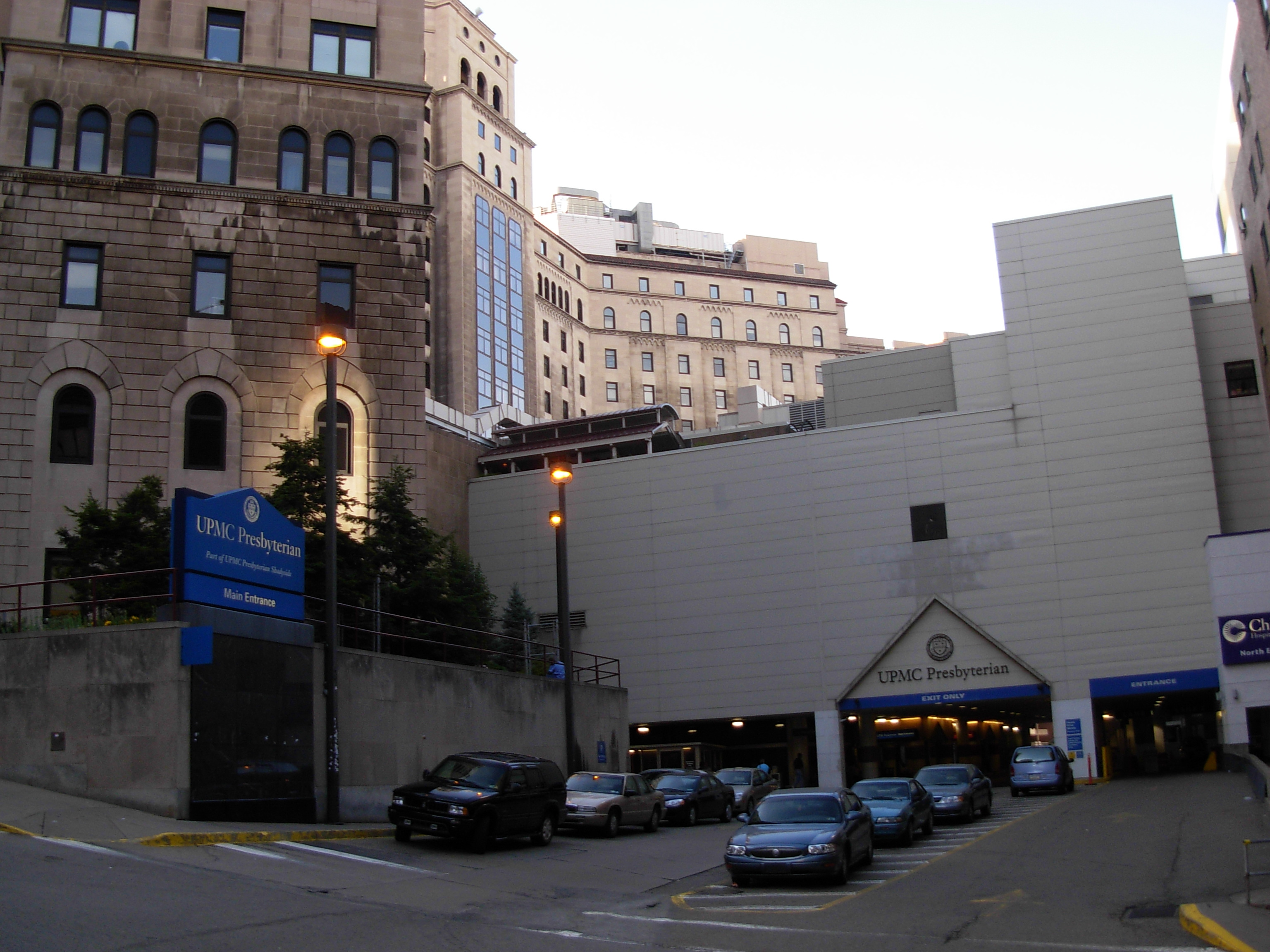
UPMC Presbyterian - main entrance, University of Pittsburgh

=== Modern day ===
In January 2001, American Nobel Prize laureate, Herbert A. Simon underwent surgery at UPMC Presbyterian to remove a cancerous tumor in his abdomen. Although the surgery was successful, Simon later succumbed to the complications that followed.

The old Children's Hospital location was closed on May 2, 2009, when the hospital moved to the new location in the Lawrenceville neighborhood. The original children's building was demolished in 2011 and the main tower with the helipad remained standing (as Presbyterian South) until the helipad and laboratories could move over to the Presbyterian building in 2013. The façade to Presbyterian now just consists of the renovated old bridge between Presbyterian and Children's which was completed in 2016 at a cost of $28.7 million.

In 2013, UPMC Presbyterian finished construction on their new rooftop helipad for critical transports. The need for the new helipad came from the fact that the previous helipad was located on the old Children's Hospital tower which was scheduled to be demolished. The helipad is operated by Stat Medevac, a Pittsburgh-based emergency transport organization who also maintains a dispatch center at UPMC Presbyterian.

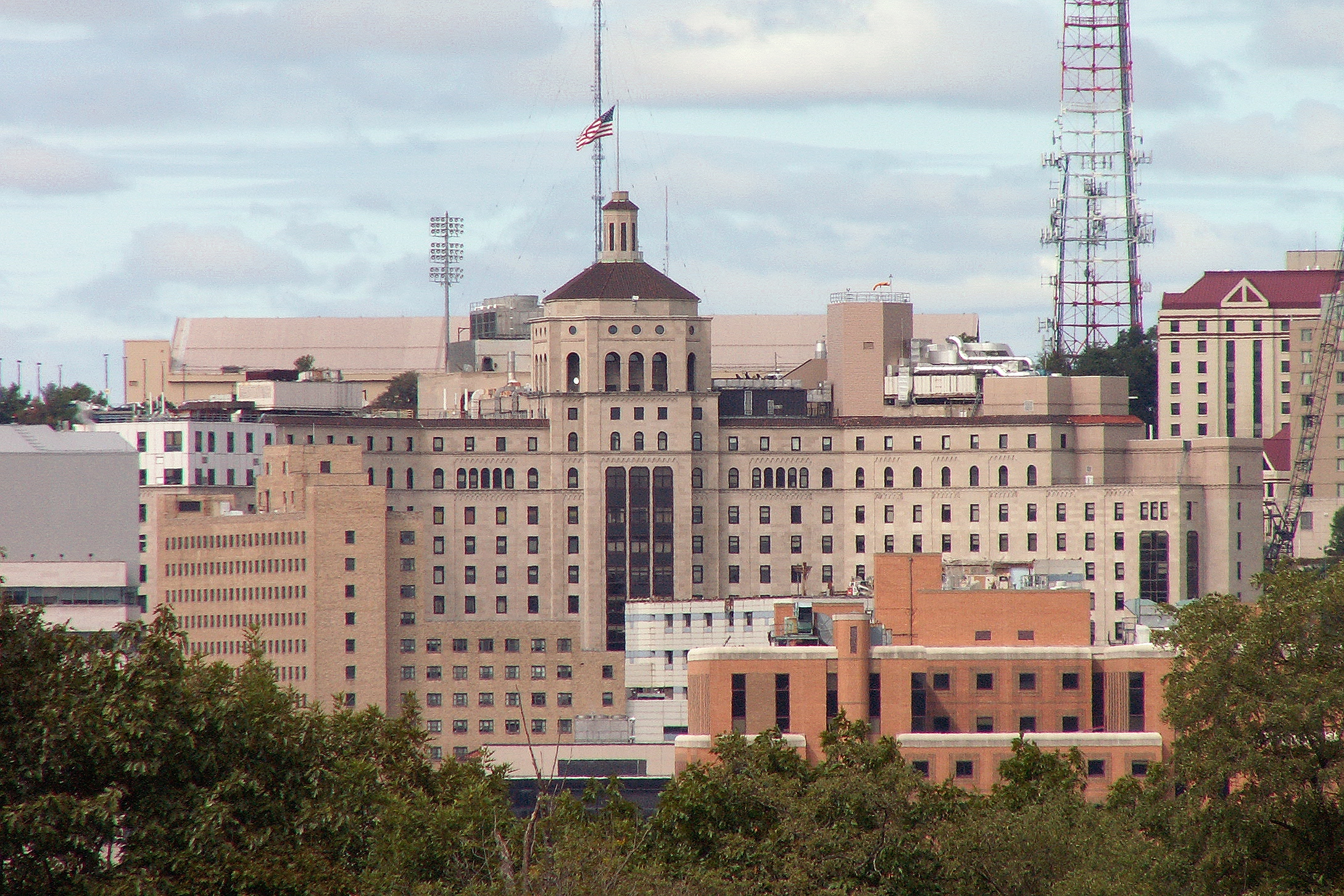
UPMC Presbyterian Hospital, Pittsburgh, as seen from Schenley Park

On October 27, 2018, a man with anti-Semitic views entered Tree of Life synagogue and started to open fire upon the worshippers inside. In total, 11 people were killed and 8 people were injured with the majority of the injured taken to the trauma center at UPMC Presbyterian, with fewer taken to UPMC Mercy and Allegheny General Hospital, the other two Pittsburgh trauma centers. In the aftermath of the shooting, United States President Donald Trump and First Lady Melania Trump traveled to Pittsburgh to visit the injured police officers, victims, and medics at the hospital.

=== 2020 Coronavirus pandemic ===
During the ongoing 2020 COVID-19 pandemic, UPMC Presbyterian (as with all UPMC Hospitals) limited their visiting policies and introduced updated visiting guidelines to help stop the spread of the virus through hospital visits.

In the wake of the pandemic, the University of Pittsburgh announced that the student dormitory, Lothrop Hall would be opened to house doctors and other healthcare providers from UPMC Presbyterian and nearby hospital, UPMC Montefiore.

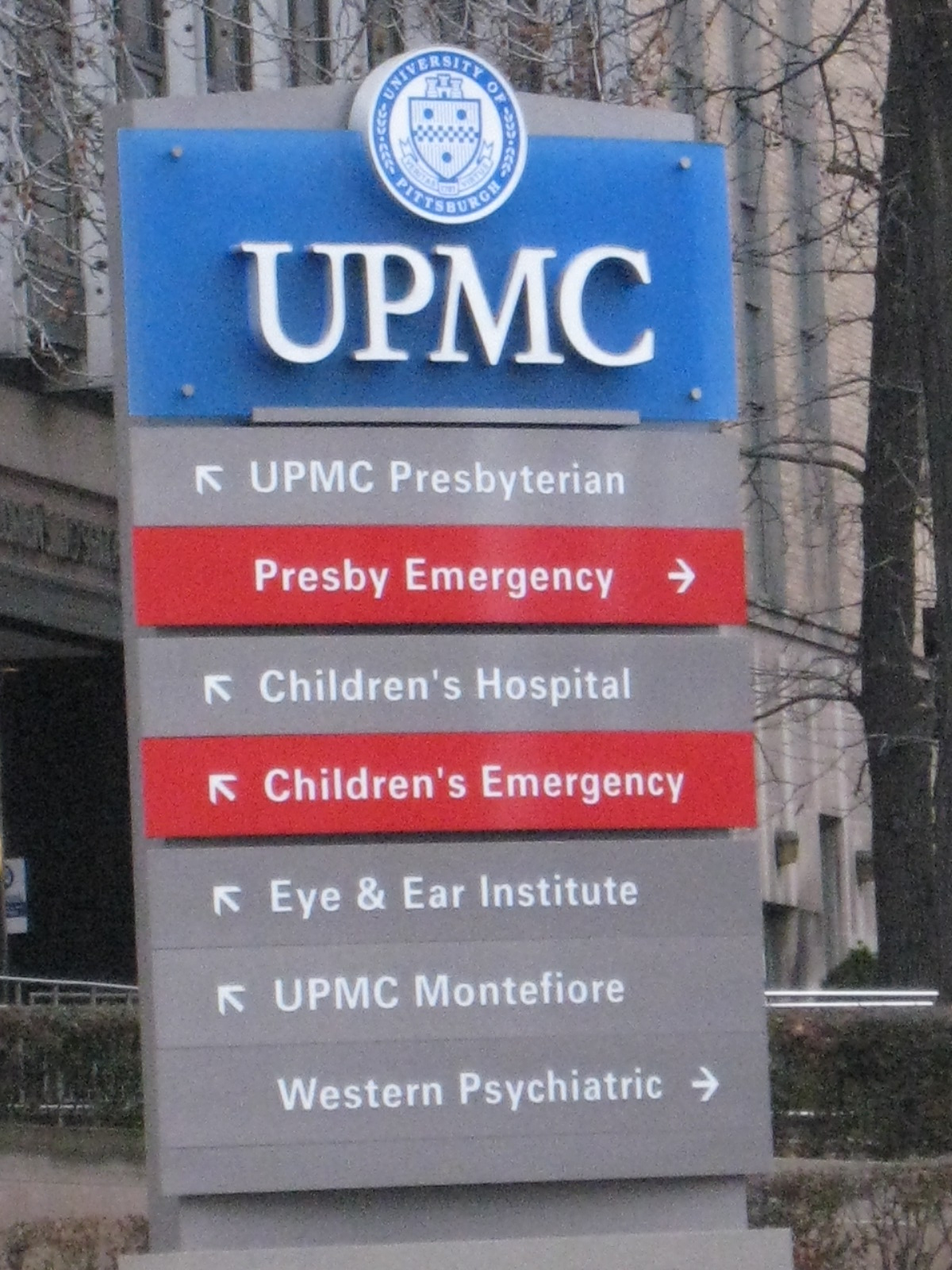
A UPMC sign board outside of the hospital before the rebranding.

Later that year in July 2020, UPMC Presbyterian had to shut down one of its patient care units after multiple staff tested positive from the unit, moving patients from the unit to others in the hospital while a deep cleaning took place.

UPMC Presbyterian also leads all hospitals in Western Pennsylvania in COVID-19 clinical trials and new drug therapies, and has the most in federal aid to help find drugs and fund clinical trials.

On December 14, the first doses of the Pfizer–BioNTech COVID-19 vaccine in Pennsylvania were issued to healthcare workers. Charmaine Pykosh, an acute care nurse in the surgical/intensive care unit at UPMC Presbyterian in Pittsburgh, received the first dose of the vaccine in Pennsylvania.

=== New Hospital ===
On September 26, 2018, UPMC unveiled plans for a new 18-story, 900,000 square foot (84,000 m^{2}) tower with 620 private rooms, UPMC Heart and Transplant Hospital at UPMC Presbyterian on the site of the former Children's Hospital.

The hospital is designed to highlight the world-famous transplant program at UPMC, made famous by pioneer, Dr. Thomas Starzl. UPMC Heart and Transplant Hospital will be the region's largest hospital dedicated to one specialty.

The patient care units at Presbyterian will be converted to offices after the tower opens. UPMC has also announced that they would be partnering with technology firm Microsoft to build the hospitals, integrating technology into the design to help reduce the friction between technology and healthcare workers.

In May 2021, UPMC announced that the new date for construction would be in the second quarter of 2022 due to a mixture of both the COVID-19 pandemic and labor shortages. In August, the plans for the tower had been changed to 17-stories and 636 beds.

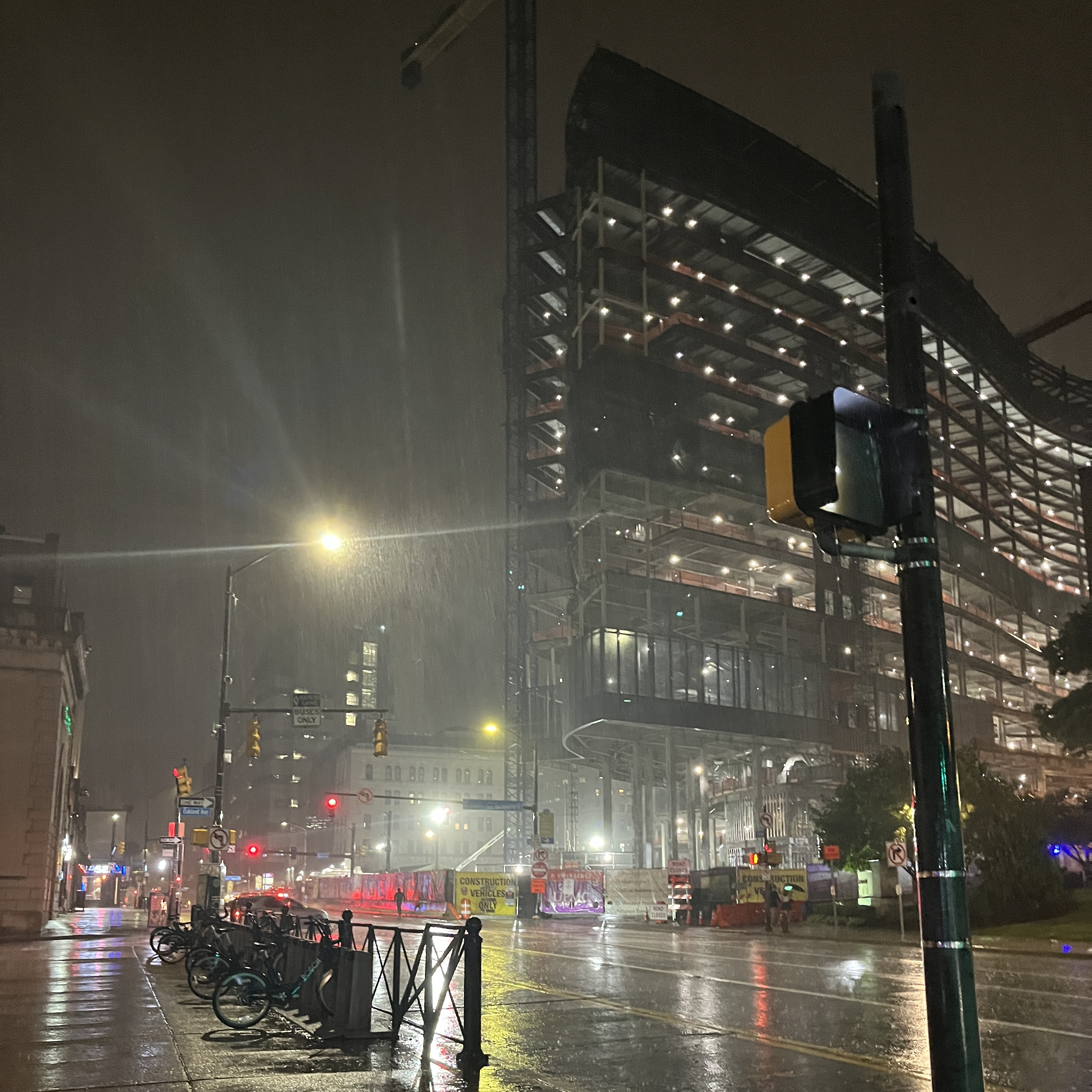
A night-time look at the construction of New UPMC Presbyterian Hospital from Fifth Ave and Bouquet St.

In December 2021, UPMC announced that they had bought another section of land adjacent to the site and started meeting with local community and planning boards with the hope to begin construction on the new hospital by the end of 2022.

On June 14, 2022, UPMC broke ground on the $1.5 billion tower. On October 1, 2024, the tower was topped out. On July 22, 2025, a local couple philanthropists donated $65 million for the tower, after the donation it was named the Daniel G and Carole L Kamin Tower. In December, the cost of the tower was reduced to $1.3 billion. The Daniel G and Carole L Kamin Tower is expected to open January 24, 2027.

== About ==
=== Campus ===
Since UPMC Presbyterian is a teaching hospital, it is affiliated with the University of Pittsburgh School of Medicine and is physically conjoined to the medical school's primary facility, Scaife Hall. UPMC Presbyterian is also connected via enclosed pedestrian bridges and tunnels to UPMC Montefiore hospital, UPMC Western Psychiatric Hospital, the Eye & Ear Institute, Falk Clinic, the University of Pittsburgh School of Nursing's Victoria Hall, the University of Pittsburgh's Lothrop Hall student residence, and multiple university biomedical science towers.

=== Awards ===
In 1987, the hospital was named as one of the country's 64 best hospitals in the widely published book, "The Best Hospitals in America."

In 2005, UPMC Presbyterian was ranked as the #13 best hospital nationwide on the U.S. News & World Report: Best Hospitals Honor Roll. In addition, seven of Presby's specialties were ranked nationally.

In 2011, the hospital was listed among Becker's Hospital Review 50 Best Hospitals in America.

UPMC Presbyterian was ranked nationally in 14 adult specialties and high performing in one on the 2012-13 U.S. News & World Report: Best Hospital rankings. In addition, the hospital was ranked as #10 in the United States by U.S. News & World Report.

The hospital has received the "America's 100 Best Hospitals for Prostate Surgery Award" from Healthgrades for 2019, 2020, and 2021.

In 2019, the hospital was named to the "100 great hospitals in America" list by medical publication Becker's Hospital Review.

In 2019 and 2020, UPMC Presbyterian received an A grade from The Leapfrog Group's Fall 2019 Hospital Safety Grade. The hospital again received an A grade on the spring 2020 Hospital Safety Grade. As of 2020, UPMC Presbyterian has placed nationally in 11 ranked specialties and is "high performing" in 3 specialties on the U.S. News & World Report. In the 2019-20 Best Hospitals Honor Roll, UPMC Presbyterian ranked as the 15 best hospital in the United States with rankings in 11 of their specialties. In 2020 UPMC Presbyterian was awarded two Women's Choice Awards as top 6% in orthopedics and top 1% in cancer care. In 2020 the hospital was recognized by Human Rights Campaign Foundation as a "Top Performer" in their forward thinking LGBTQ policies and initiatives. In July 2020 the publication, Newsweek ranked UPMC Presbyterian as #33 on their list of the world's best hospitals.

The hospital (ranked together with UPMC Shadyside) ranked nationally in 11 adult specialties and as #2 in Pennsylvania (after Penn Presbyterian) on the 2020-21 U.S. News & World Report: Best Hospitals rankings.

2020-21 U.S. News & World Report Rankings for UPMC Presbyterian
Specialty	Rank (In the U.S.)	Score (Out of 100)
Cancer	#15	63.5
Cardiology & Heart Surgery	High Performing	53.7
Diabetes & Endocrinology	#46	55.1
Ear, Nose & Throat	#32	67.0
Gastroenterology & GI Surgery	#17	72.7
Geriatrics	#23	82.1
Nephrology	#40	56.4
Neurology & Neurosurgery	#24	72.1
Ophthalmology	Not Ranked	1.5
Orthopedics	#19	57.8
Psychiatry	High Performing	3.6
Pulmonology & Lung Surgery	#41	69.3
Rehabilitation	High Performing	4.5
Rheumatology	#12	5.4
Urology	#35	63.8

== Controversy ==
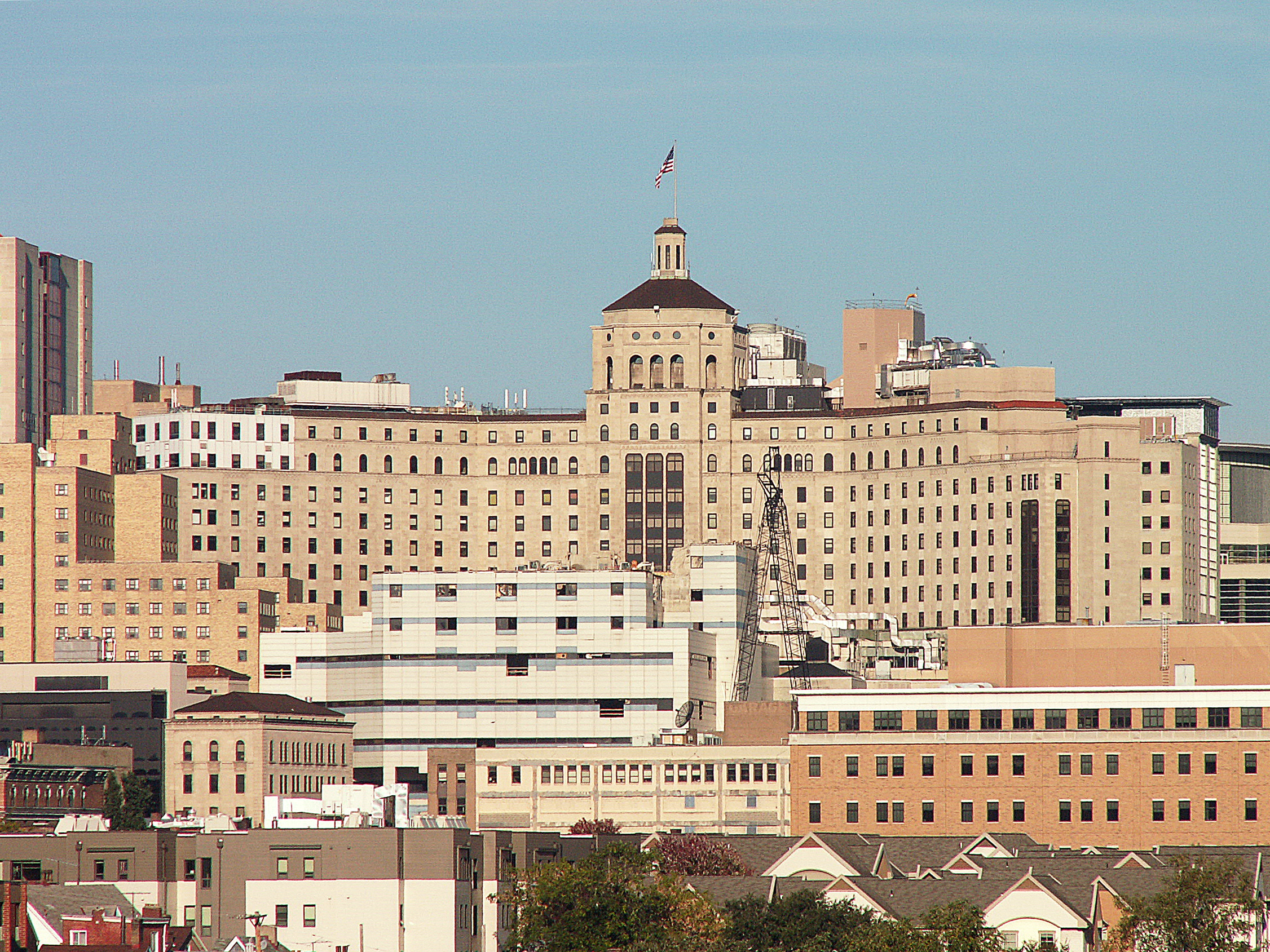
The hospital midway through demolition of the former Children's main tower (Presbyterian South).

In 2017 it was discovered that five patients have died from mold infections since October 2014. UPMC suspended all of their transplants while investigating what was causing the deaths. An investigation into the deaths revealed that mold was found in linens on patient beds. These linens were found to have come from Paris Healthcare Linens, UPMC's linen provider. UPMC then hired investigators to test hospital sites and Paris Linen facilities. The mold was found in all areas of Paris and found on linens at UPMC Presbyterian. Multiple wrongful death lawsuits were filed against the hospital and UPMC has settled in few of them. UPMC continues to contract with Paris in 22 out of 25 of their hospitals. Paris was also implicated in the lawsuits and has settled out of court with the plaintiffs. UPMC has published two peer-reviewed reports on the Mucorales contamination of healthcare linens at other major U.S. hospitals as well as describing interventions to remediate linen contamination of Mucorales in a laundry facility.

In May 2019 members of the public voiced concerns at a board meeting at UPMC Presbyterian over UPMC's practices of not acting like the non-profit that they are. Pennsylvania Lieutenant Governor, John Fetterman attended and made the statement "In 10 years, I haven't seen UPMC do the right thing."

== Notable people ==
=== Faculty ===
- Yuan Chang
- Thomas Detre
- Freddie Fu
- Joseph Maroon
- Eugene Nicholas Myers
- Peter Safar
- Jonas Salk
- Thomas Starzl

=== Patients ===
- Byrd Brown
- Rob Buck
- Richard Caliguiri
- Robert P. Casey
- Sidney Crosby
- L. C. Greenwood
- Dick Groat
- Zlatan Ibrahimović
- Evgeni Malkin
- Michele McDonald
- William G. McGowan
- Bob O'Connor
- Bob Prince
- Dan Rooney
- Herbert A. Simon
- Joseph Soffer

== See also ==
- University of Pittsburgh Medical Center
- UPMC Children's Hospital of Pittsburgh
- University of Pittsburgh
