= UPMC Magee-Womens Hospital =

UPMC Magee-Women's Hospital
- University of Pittsburgh Medical Center

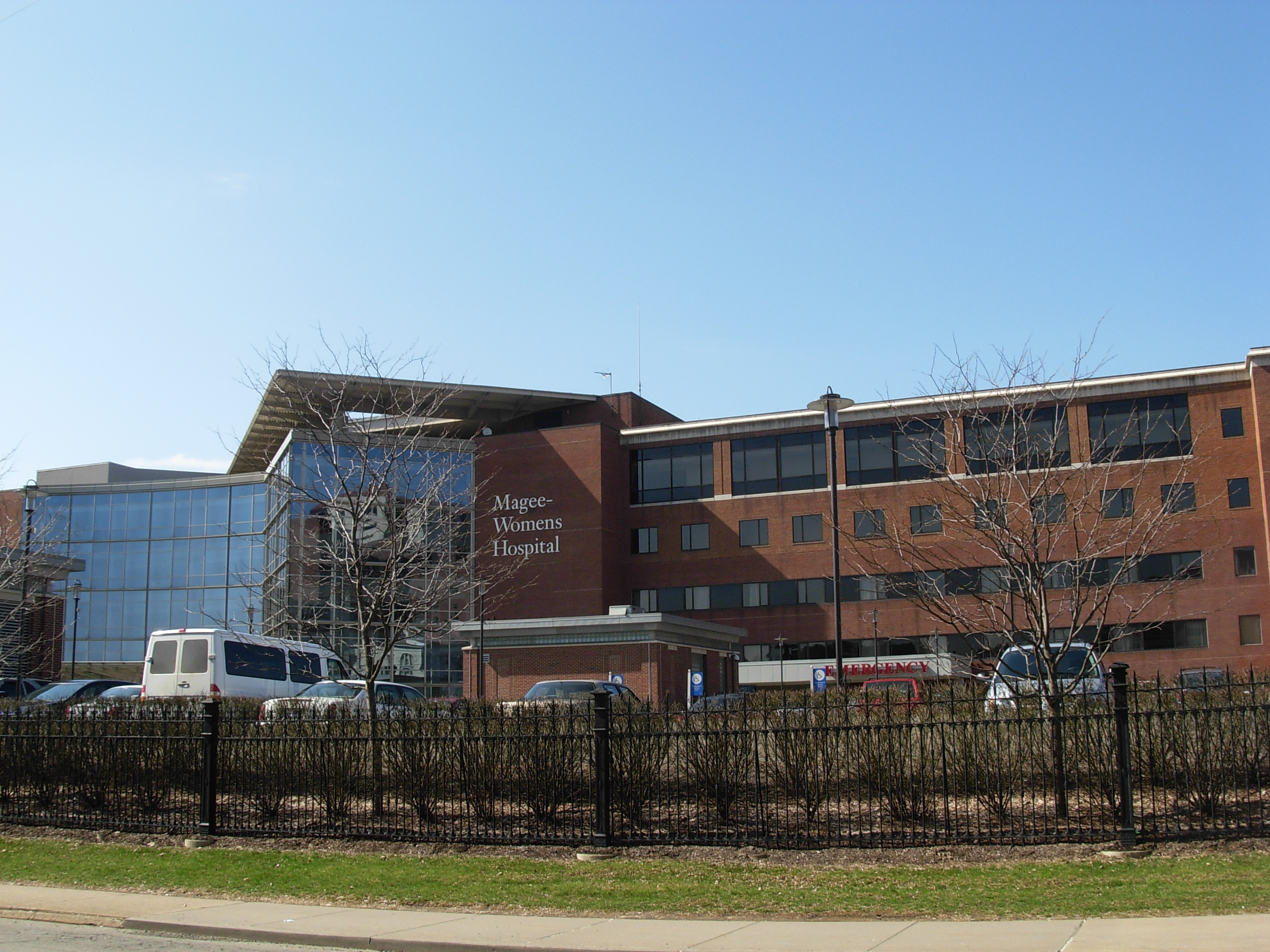

Geography
- Location: 300 Halket Street, Pittsburgh, Pennsylvania, United States
- Coordinates: 40.436985°N 79.960741°W

Organization
- Type: Teaching
- Affiliated university: University of Pittsburgh School of Medicine

Services
- Emergency department: Yes
- Beds: 335

History
- Founded: January 19, 1911

Links
- Website: www.upmc.com/locations/hospitals/magee
- Lists: Hospitals in Pennsylvania

UPMC Magee-Women's Hospital, known simply as Magee-Womens Hospital, is a nationally ranked, 335-bed non-profit, full service specialty hospital located in the South Oakland neighborhood of Pittsburgh, Pennsylvania, United States. Magee-Womens is a part of the University of Pittsburgh Medical Center (UPMC). The hospital is near UPMC's flagship campus which houses Presbyterian and Montefiore. While the hospital is UPMC's primary facility for women's health, the hospital is a full service hospital that also serves men. As the hospital is a teaching hospital, it is affiliated with University of Pittsburgh School of Medicine.

== History ==
The history of Magee dates back to the early 1900s when on January 19, 1911, Mrs. Alfred Birdsall delivered a baby at a makeshift hospital in the former home of politician Christopher Magee. Magee Hospital was built on the grounds of Magee's home and named in honor of his mother, Elizabeth Steel Magee.

In 1931, Magee Hospital and the University of Pittsburgh created an agreement to establish a 28-bed teaching unit at the hospital. In 1962, Magee Hospital merged with Pittsburgh Woman's Hospital, forming Magee-Womens Hospital.

The hospital merged with UPMC in 1999. In 2011, the hospital undertook an expansion of its main facility, which was completed in June 2012. The expansion added six floors, increased the number of beds from 318 to 335 (including 14 additional intensive care rooms), and expanded the surgical and ambulatory facilities.

== About ==
UPMC Magee-Womens Hospital is a UPMC specialty hospital that serves as its primary facility for women's health. While primarily a women's hospital, it has offered some services for men since the 1960s.

The hospital is located in the Oakland neighborhood of Pittsburgh near UPMC Presbyterian, a location it has been at since its fourth year in 1915. It currently is equipped with 335 beds, an emergency room and ambulatory facilities on four floors which allows it to offer all possible services under one roof including family medicine physicians, gastroenterologists, dermatologists, rheumatologists, pulmonary specialists, orthopedists, urologists and neurologists.

Magee-Womens has a staff of 2,500, of which 1,500 are medically licensed. It also operates a satellite hospital in the city's northern suburbs as part as the UPMC Passavant facility as well as 9 metro area imaging clinics.

Magee performs 10,000 births each year, which accounts for 45% of all births in Allegheny County.

=== UPMC Hamot campus ===
UPMC Hamot Women's Hospital is a five-story, 165,000-square-foot (15,300 m^{2}), 93-bed stand-alone hospital that opened in 2011. The hospital houses obstetrics, neonatology, and gynecology specialities of UPMC Hamot and includes a Level III neonatal intensive care unit. As of October 2013, it also houses the Pediatrics wing of UPMC Hamot.

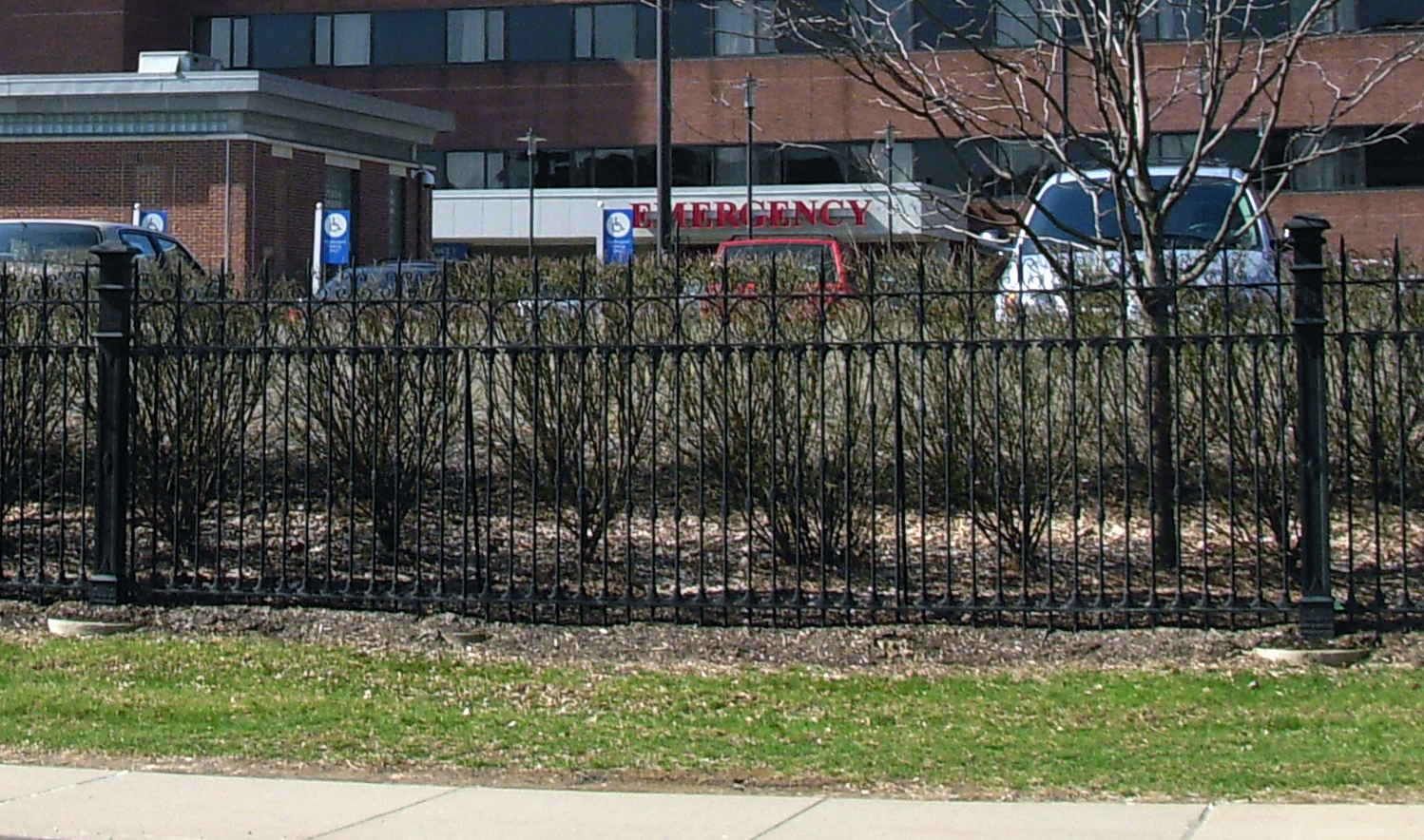
Iron Fence from "The Maples" (C.L. Magee estate) in front of Magee-Womens hospital of UPMC. The emergency department of Magee-Women's is visible in the background.

In December 2015, UPMC Hamot Women's Hospital was renamed to Magee-Womens Hospital - UPMC Hamot Campus to reflect its alignment with Magee-Womens Hospital of UPMC.

=== Awards ===
In 2005, Magee-Women's was rated as the #17 best hospital in the United States in the field of gynecology on the U.S. News & World Report.

In 2014 and 2017, the hospital was named to the "100 hospitals with great women's health programs" by Becker's Hospital Review.

As of 2016–17, Magee-Womens ranked nationally as #12 nationally in gynecology and #32 nationally in orthopedics on the U.S. News & World Report.

The hospital ranked nationally as #26 in orthopedics, high performing in cancer, and high performing in urology on the 2017-18 U.S. News & World Report.

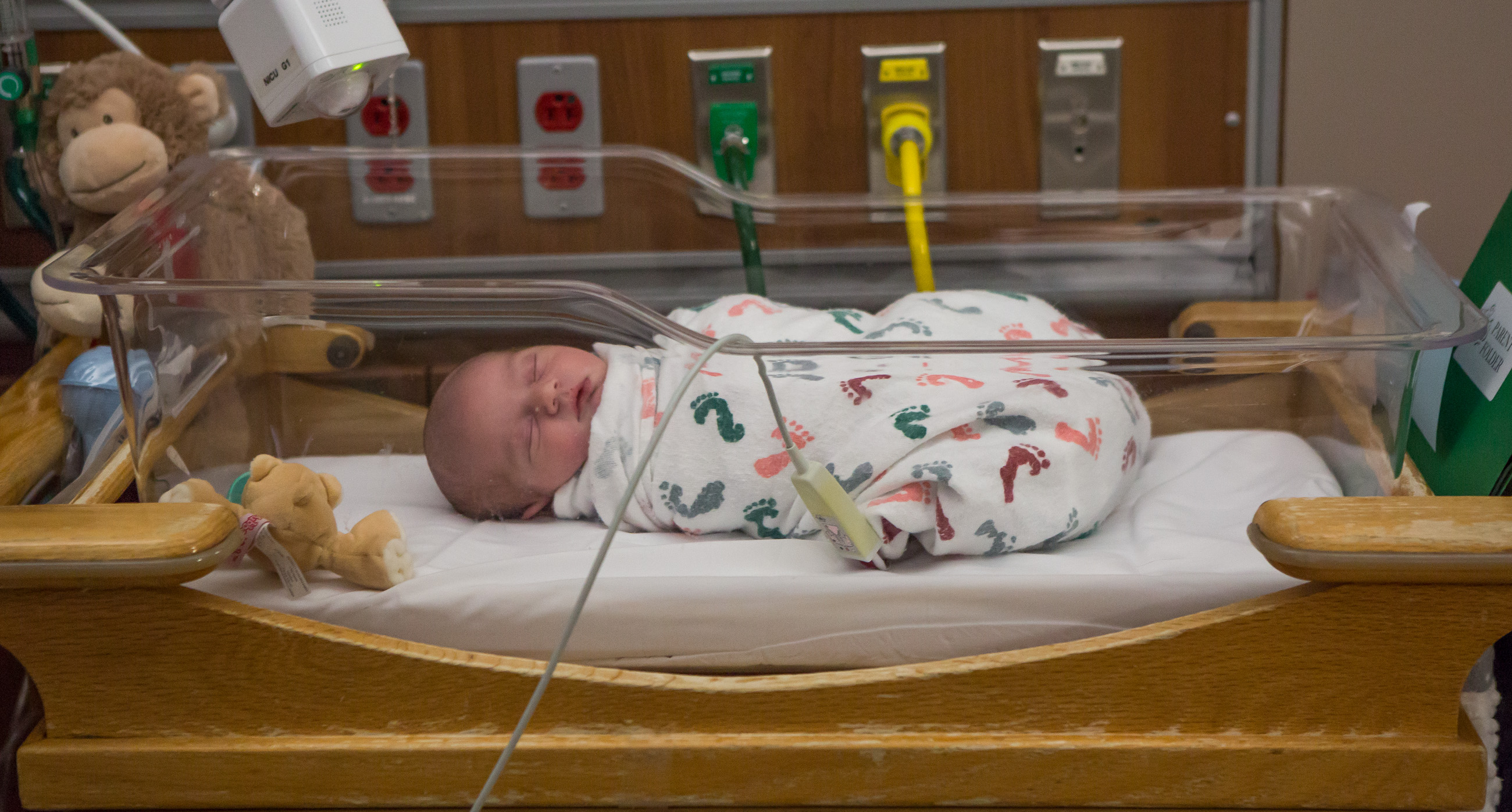
Baby at UPMC Magee-Women's

In 2020, the hospital was recognized by Human Rights Campaign Foundation as a "Top Performer" in their forward thinking LGBTQ policies and initiatives.

In 2020, Magee-Womens was awarded three Women's Choice Awards as top 7% in bariatrics, top 2% in cancer care, and a best hospital in patient experience.

UPMC Magee-Women's Hospital was ranked nationally as #47 in gynecology on the 2020-21 U.S. News & World Report and ranked as high performing in hip and knee replacement.

== See also ==
- University of Pittsburgh Medical Center
- University of Pittsburgh School of Medicine
- UPMC Presbyterian
- UPMC Children's Hospital of Pittsburgh
- UPMC Heart and Transplant Hospital
