= UPMC Hamot =

- University of Pittsburgh Medical Center

- Location of UPMC Hamot in Pennsylvania

Geography
- Location: Erie, Pennsylvania, USA
- Coordinates: 42.1338°N 80.0867°W

Organisation
- Care system: Private
- Type: Academic tertiary care
- Affiliated university: University of Pittsburgh School of Medicine; LECOM

Services
- Standards: JCAHO accreditation
- Emergency department: Level II Trauma
- Beds: 412

History
- Founded: 1881

Links
- Website: UPMC Hamot
- Lists: Hospitals in Pennsylvania

UPMC Hamot, formerly known as Hamot Medical Center, is a 446-bed hospital and a tertiary-care medical facility located in Erie, Pennsylvania. It is one of the largest employers in the Erie region. The complex features several large buildings, including a heart institute. It was founded in 1881.

== History ==
Hamot was founded as the Hamot Hospital Association on February 7, 1881. The hospital was named after Pierre Simon Vincent Hamot, a successful French businessman who had settled in Erie in the early 19th century and became an active member of the community. Following his death in 1846, his children and grandchildren donated the Hamot Homestead for use as a general hospital. Quickly organized and managed by the first nurse hired by the hospital, Irene Sutleff, the hospital opened its doors to the public on July 1, 1881, and treated its first patient who was admitted on July 10, 1881. The Hamot Homestead facility quickly outgrew its 25 patient capacity, and the first of many expansions was conducted in 1888.

In 2009, Kane Community Hospital in Kane, Pennsylvania became a controlled affiliate of the Hamot Health Foundation, and therefore later became affiliated with UPMC through Hamot's integration with UPMC in 2011. UPMC Hamot also has clinical affiliations with Charles Cole Memorial Hospital, Elk Regional Health Center, and Warren General Hospital.

On January 8, 2011, Hamot opened a five-story, $59 million Hamot Women's Hospital to house its obstetrics and gynecology services. Hamot's marketing campaigns have used a variety of themes, including "...it matters where you go", and "leading the way to better health".

=== Affiliation with UPMC ===
On August 27, 2010, Hamot Medical Center and the University of Pittsburgh Medical Center (UPMC) signed a letter of intent to negotiate a $300 million affiliation deal. On January 10, 2011, Hamot's board of trustees unanimously approved a formal agreement to affiliate and integrate into UPMC as the medical center's tertiary hub for northwestern Pennsylvania. Hamot's affiliation with UPMC official began on February 1, 2011, and the medical center was renamed "UPMC Hamot". In December 2015, UPMC Hamot Women's Hospital was renamed to Magee-Women's Hospital - UPMC Hamot Campus to reflect its alignment with Magee-Women's Hospital of UPMC.

== Recognition ==
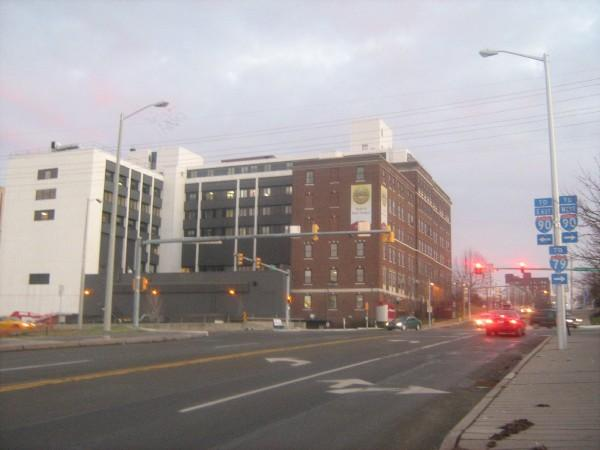
UPMC Hamot as seen from Bayfront Parkway

UPMC Hamot is listed among Thomson Reuters 100 Top Hospitals, Becker's Hospital Review 50 Best Hospitals in America, and has been recognized numerous times as being among the 50 best hospitals in various specialties by U.S. News & World Report.

== See also ==
- UPMC Magee-Women's Hospital
