= Jackson Township, York County, Pennsylvania =

Township in Pennsylvania, US

Coordinates: 39°52′36″N 76°54′59″W

- Township
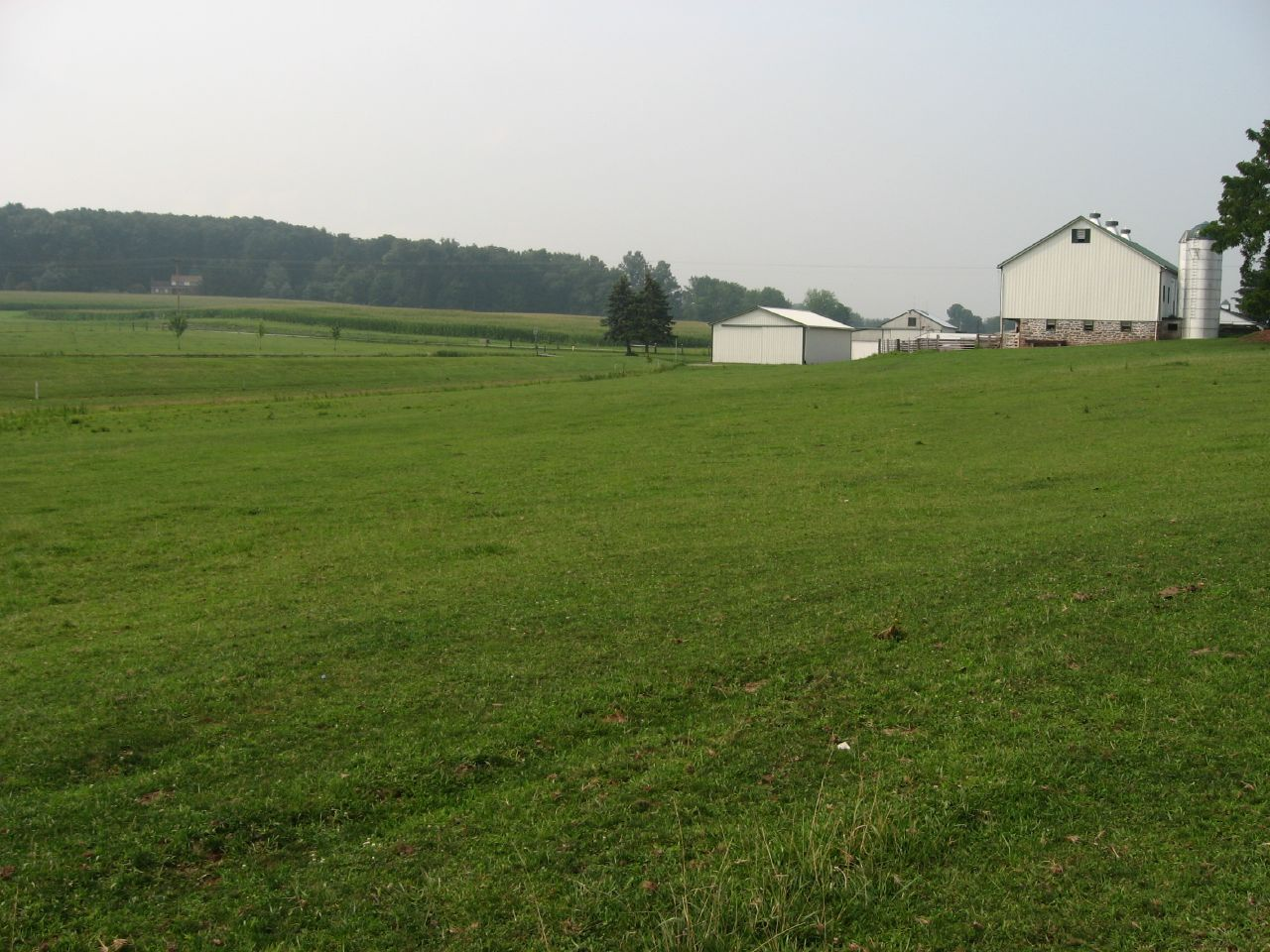
- A farm in Jackson Township

- Location in York County and the state of Pennsylvania.
- Country: United States
- State: Pennsylvania
- County: York
- Settled: 1756
- Incorporated: 1857

Government
  - Type: Board of Supervisors

Area
  - Total: 22.80 sq mi (59.06 km^{2})
  - Land: 22.57 sq mi (58.46 km^{2})
  - Water: 0.23 sq mi (0.60 km^{2})

Population (2020)
  - Total: 8,744 ▲
  - Estimate (2023): 9,035
  - Density: 352.6/sq mi (136.15/km^{2})
- Time zone: UTC-5 (Eastern (EST))
  - Summer (DST): UTC-4 (EDT)
- Area code: 717
- FIPS code: 42-133-37488

Historical population
Census	Pop.	Note	%±
1860	1,421		—
1870	1,499		5.5%
1880	1,836		22.5%
1890	1,603		−12.7%
1900	1,596		−0.4%
1910	1,788		12.0%
1920	1,702		−4.8%
1930	1,971		15.8%
1940	2,154		9.3%
1950	2,548		18.3%
1960	2,749		7.9%
1970	3,931		43.0%
1980	5,347		36.0%
1990	6,244		16.8%
2000	6,095		−2.4%
2010	7,494		23.0%
2020	8,744		16.7%
2023 (est.)	9,035		3.3%
U.S. Decennial Census

Jackson Township is a township in York County, Pennsylvania, United States. The population was 8,744 at the 2020 census. It was founded in 1853 from parts of Paradise Township. Jackson Township education is served by the Spring Grove Area School District. Police coverage is provided by Northern York County Regional Police Department, and EMS is provided by Spring Grove Area Ambulance. The township is home to York Airport.

== Geography ==
According to the U.S. Census Bureau, the township has a total area of 22.6 square miles (59 km^{2}), of which 22.4 square miles (58 km^{2}) is land and 0.2 square miles (0.52 km^{2}), or 0.97%, is water. The township surrounds on three sides the borough of Spring Grove, located along Codorus Creek, the southern boundary of the township and the borough.

== Demographics ==
As of the 2000 census, there were 6,095 people, 2,281 households, and 1,795 families living in the township. The population density was 272.0 inhabitants per square mile (105.0/km^{2}). There were 2,364 housing units at an average density of 105.5 units per square mile (40.7 units/km^{2}). The racial makeup of the township was 98.29% White, 0.33% African American, 0.10% Native American, 0.38% Asian, 0.33% from other races, and 0.57% from two or more races. Hispanic or Latino of any race were 1.05% of the population.

There were 2,281 households, out of which 35.5% had children under the age of 18 living with them, 67.1% were married couples living together, 8.1% had a female householder with no husband present, and 21.3% were non-families. 16.7% of all households were made up of individuals, and 5.7% had someone living alone who was 65 years of age or older. The average household size was 2.67 and the average family size was 2.98.

In the township, the population was spread out, with 24.9% under the age of 18, 6.6% from 18 to 24, 31.6% from 25 to 44, 26.2% from 45 to 64, and 10.8% who were 65 years of age or older. The median age was 38 years. For every 100 females, there were 103.0 males. For every 100 females age 18 and over, there were 102.8 males.

The median income for a household in the township was $49,781, and the median income for a family was $53,272. Males had a median income of $38,021 versus $22,193 for females. The per capita income for the township was $19,464. About 1.9% of families and 2.6% of the population were below the poverty line, including 2.6% of those under age 18 and 3.0% of those age 65 or over.
