= Port Meadville Airport =

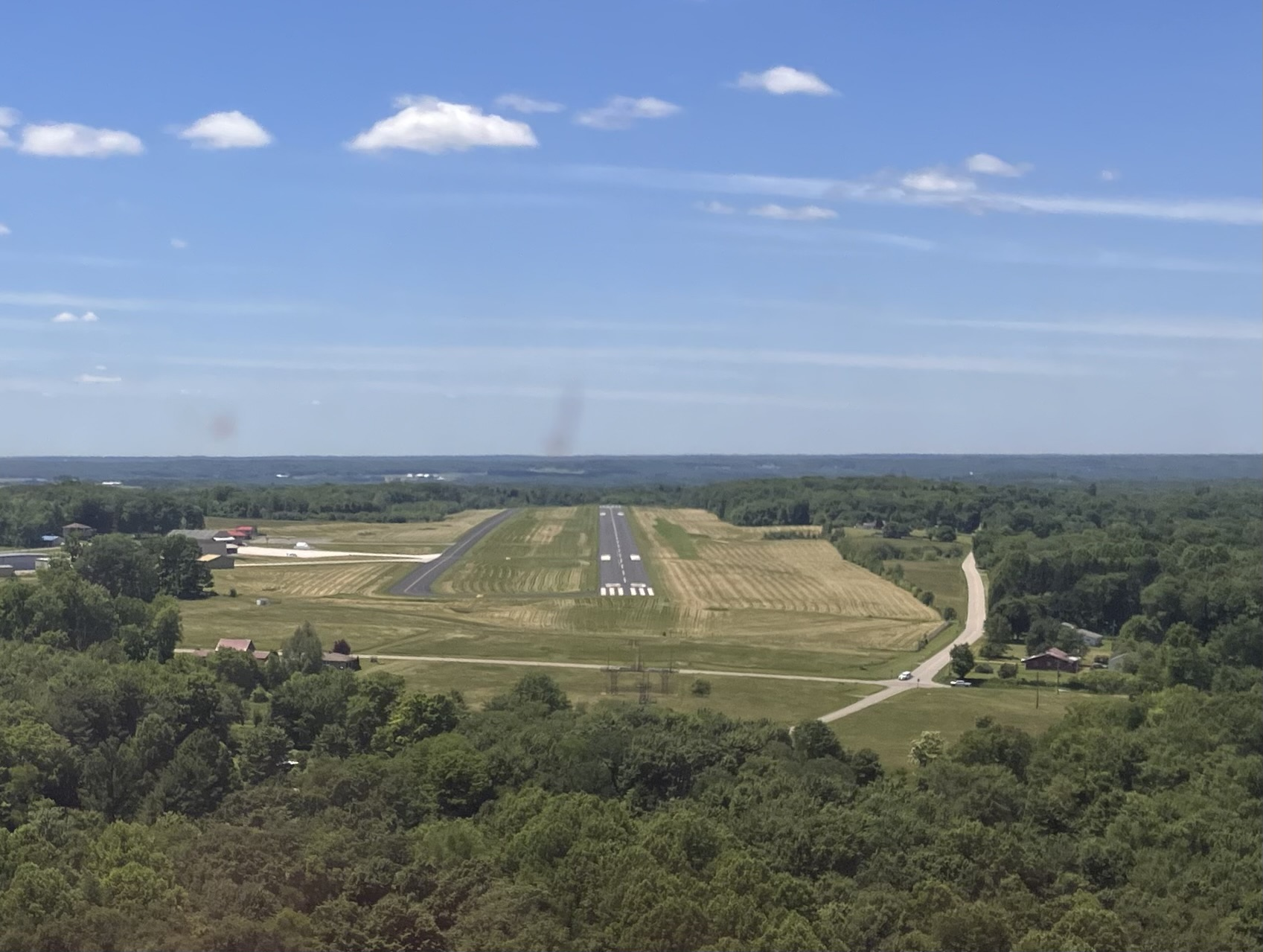
- Runway 25 (East end) of Port Meadville Airport
- IATA: MEJ; ICAO: KGKJ; FAA LID: GKJ

Summary
- Airport type: Public
- Owner: Crawford County Regional Airport Authority
- Serves: Meadville, Pennsylvania
- Elevation AMSL: 1,399 ft / 426 m
- Coordinates: 41°37′36″N 080°12′53″W
- Website: https://www.portmeadvilleairport.com

Map
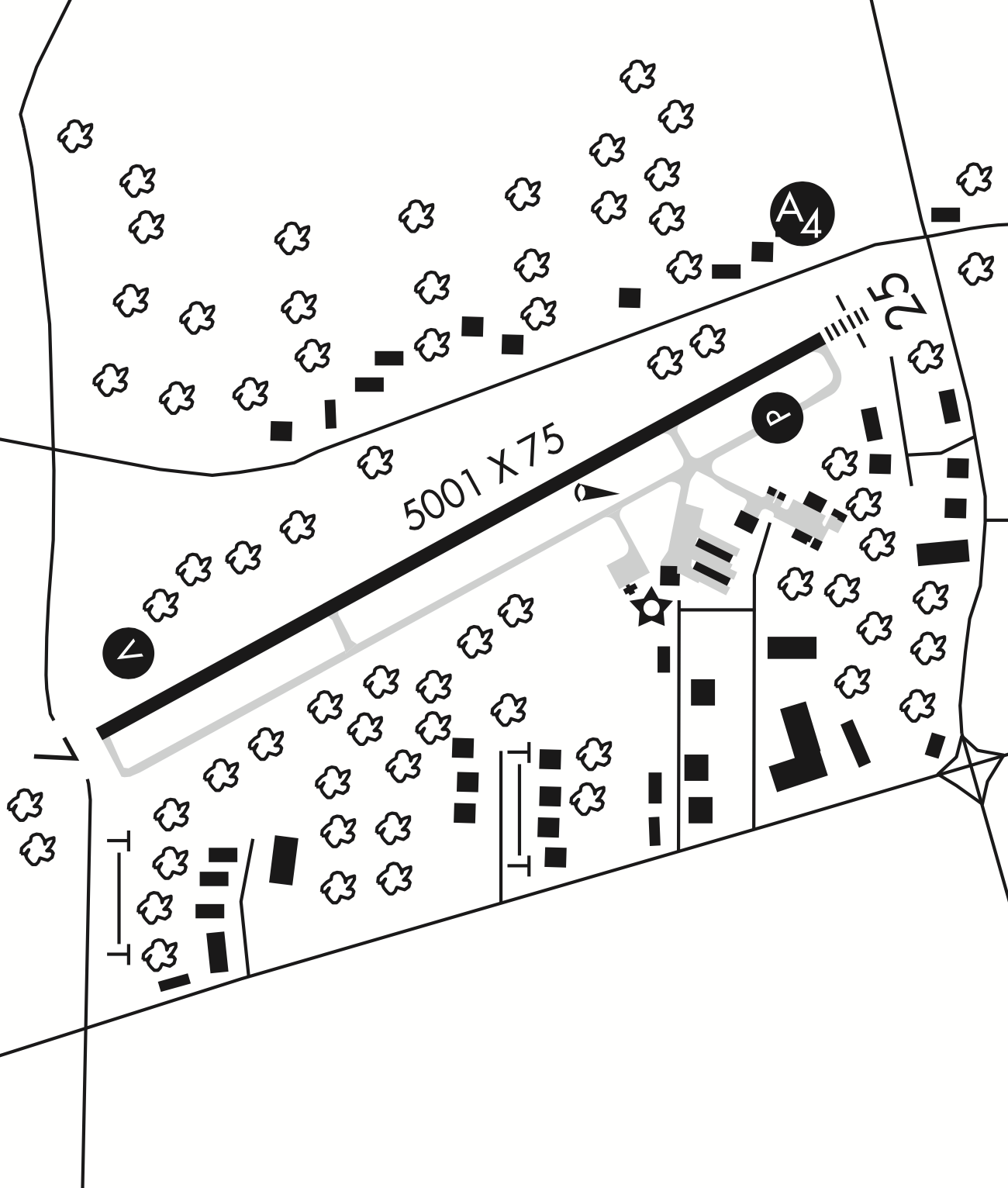
- FAA Airport Diagram

Runways
Direction	Length		Surface
Direction	ft	m	Surface
7/25	5,001	1,524	Asphalt

Helipads
Number	Length		Surface
Number	ft	m	Surface
H1	50	15	Concrete

Statistics (2010)
- Aircraft operations: 13,220
- Based aircraft: 27
- Source: Federal Aviation Administration

Port Meadville Airport (IATA: MEJ, ICAO: KGKJ, FAA LID: GKJ) is a public use airport located three nautical miles (3.5 mi; 5.6 km) west of the central business district of Meadville, in Crawford County, Pennsylvania, United States. It is included in the FAA's National Plan of Integrated Airport Systems for 2011–2015, which categorized it as a general aviation facility.

Although many U.S. airports use the same three-letter location identifier for the FAA and IATA, this airport is assigned GKJ by the FAA and MEJ by the IATA.

== Facilities and aircraft ==
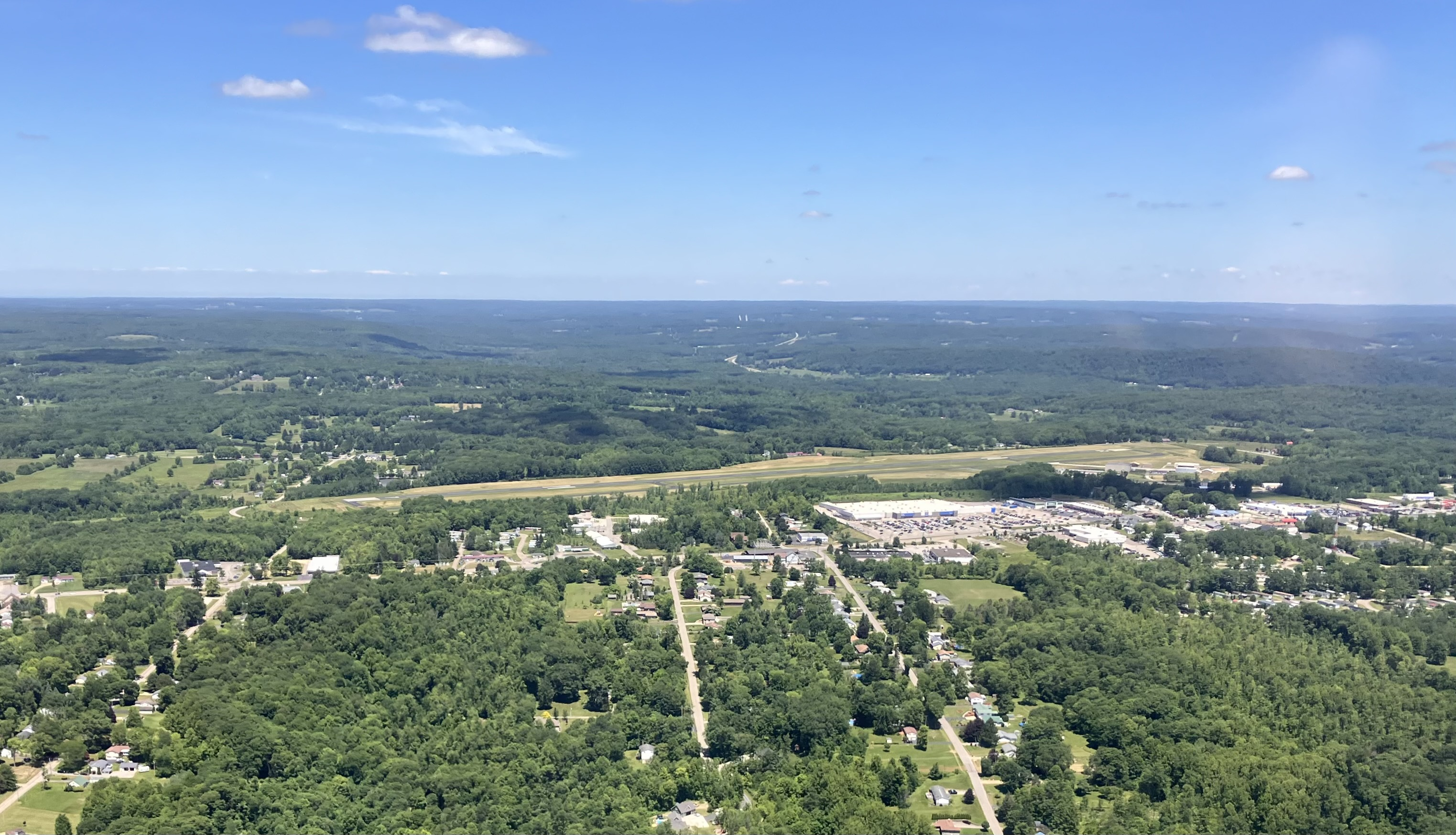
Airport viewed from the pattern altitude.

Port Meadville Airport covers an area of 250 acres (100 ha) at an elevation of 1,399 feet (426 m) above mean sea level. It has one runway designated 7/25 with an asphalt surface measuring 5,001 by 75 feet (1,524 by 23 m).

The airport also has one 50 by 50 feet (15 m × 15 m) concrete helipad that serves as the home base for Stat MedEvac 7, a regional air and ground critical care transport system.

For the 12-month period ending May 21, 2019, the airport had 13,369 aircraft operations, an average of 37 per day: 97% general aviation, 2% air taxi, and 1% military. At that time there were 17 aircraft based at this airport: 77% single-engine, 12% multi-engine, 6% jet, and 6% helicopter.

== See also ==
- List of airports in Pennsylvania
