= List of hospitals in Pennsylvania =

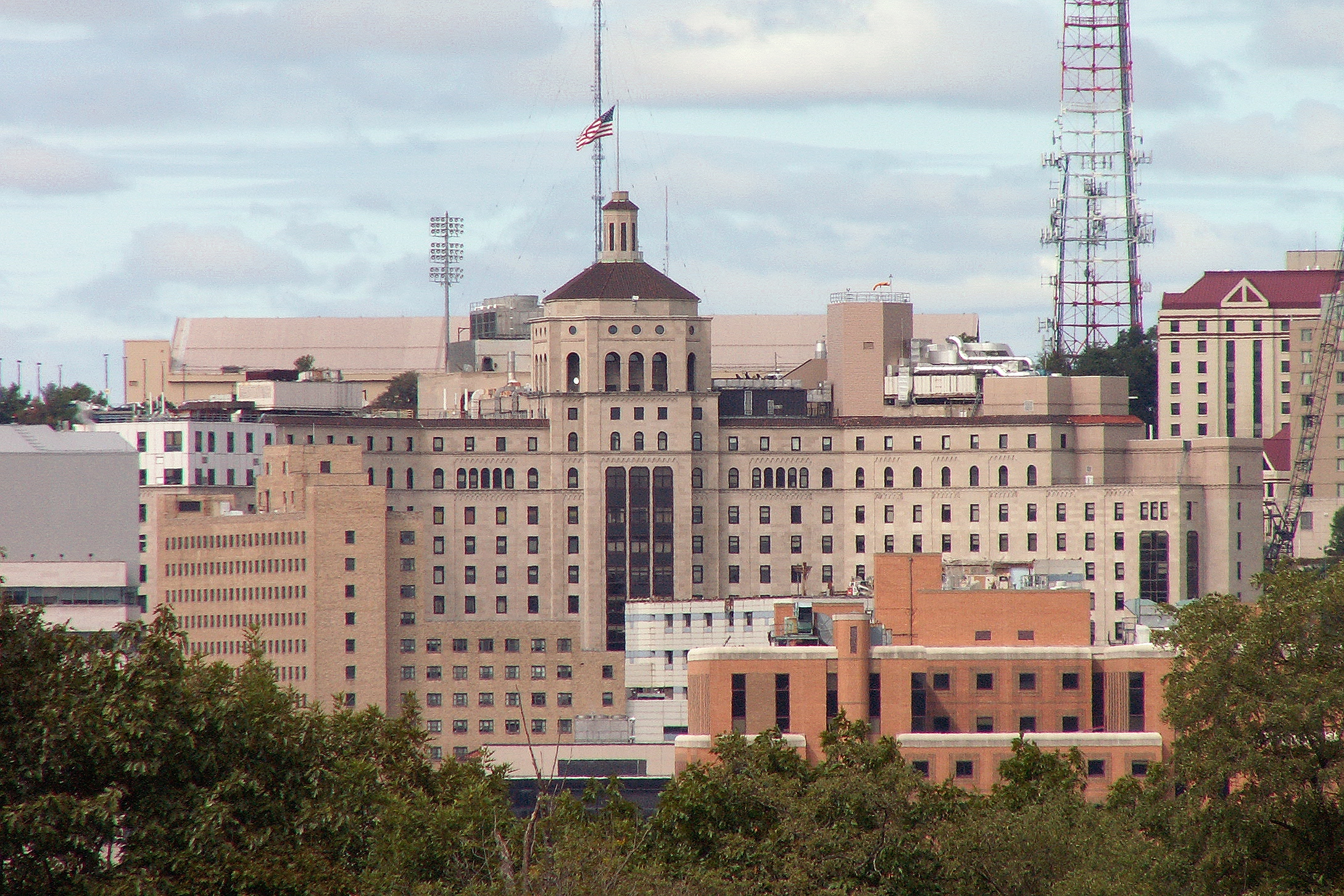
UPMC Presbyterian in Pittsburgh, the largest hospital in Pennsylvania with 1,577 beds and 77 operating rooms, October 2015

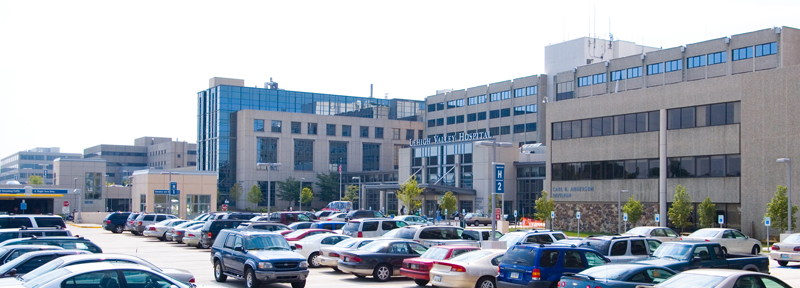
Lehigh Valley Hospital–Cedar Crest in Allentown, the third-largest hospital in Pennsylvania and largest hospital in the Lehigh Valley, with 877 beds and 46 operating rooms, July 2008

This is a list of hospitals in Pennsylvania, a U.S. state. The list includes only hospitals that are currently licensed by the Pennsylvania Department of Health or operated by the Veterans Health Administration, according to data collected by the Hospital and Healthsystem Association of Pennsylvania (HAP) and the Pennsylvania Department of Health.

As of July 2018, there were 249 state licensed hospitals and VA hospital facilities in Pennsylvania. 148 of these facilities were nonprofit, 86 were for-profit or "investor-owned", and 15 were public hospitals owned by the Federal government, state government, or in one case, the city of Philadelphia. There were 42,817 total licensed beds and 1,880 total operating rooms. 156 were general acute hospitals (with 10 more classified as general acute specialty hospitals), 29 were psychiatric hospitals, 22 were long-term acute care hospitals, 21 were rehabilitation hospitals, and 7 were VA hospitals. The largest hospital by both beds and operating rooms was UPMC Presbyterian-Shadyside in Pittsburgh. The University of Pittsburgh Medical Center (UPMC) was also the largest health system network in the state by number of hospitals (28), beds (7,022), and operating rooms (379).

== Hospitals in Pennsylvania ==
The following list is initially sorted alphabetically and can be sorted by additional categories. Hospital names are the latest as provided to HAP in their July 2018 dataset and may not reflect the current name or the name used by the hospital for marketing purposes. See the Notes column for additional information.

Name	City	County	Licensed beds	Operating rooms	Tax status	Type	Health system	US News PA rank	Notes
ACMH Hospital	Kittanning	Armstrong	147	8	Non-profit	General acute	Independent	—	—
Advanced Surgical Hospital	Washington	Washington	14	4	For-profit	General acute specialty	Independent	—	—
AHN Grove City	Grove City	Mercer	90	4	Non-Profit	General acute	Allegheny Health Network	—	Acquired by AHN on January 10, 2020
AHN Saint Vincent	Erie	Erie	371	15	Non-profit	General acute	Allegheny Health Network	—	—
Allegheny General Hospital	Pittsburgh	Allegheny	552	39	Non-profit	General acute	Allegheny Health Network	23	—
Allegheny Valley Hospital	Natrona Heights	Allegheny	190	8	Non-profit	General acute	Allegheny Health Network	—	—
Allied Services Institute of Rehab Medicine	Scranton	Lackawanna	50	0	Non-profit	Rehabilitation	Allied Services Institute of Rehab Medicine	—	—
Barix Clinics of Pennsylvania	Langhorne	Bucks	23	4	For-profit	General acute	Independent	—	—
Barnes-Kasson County Hospital	Susquehanna	Susquehanna	25	1	Non-profit	General acute	Independent	—	—
Belmont Behavioral Hospital	Philadelphia	Philadelphia	171	0	For-profit	Psychiatric	Independent	—	—
Berwick Hospital Center	Berwick	Columbia	90	6	For-profit	General acute	Community Health Systems	—	—
Bradford Regional Medical Center	Bradford	McKean	107	6	Non-profit	General acute	Upper Allegheny Health System	—	Kaleida Health, part of
Brooke Glen Behavioral Hospital	Fort Washington	Montgomery	146	0	For-profit	Psychiatric	Independent	—	—
Bryn Mawr Hospital	Bryn Mawr	Montgomery	287	13	Non-profit	General acute	Main Line Health/Main Line Hospitals	16	—
Bryn Mawr Rehabilitation Hospital	Malvern	Chester	148	0	Non-profit	Rehabilitation	Main Line Health/Main Line Hospitals	—	—
Bucktail Medical Center	Renovo	Clinton	16	0	Non-profit	General acute	Independent	—	—
Butler Memorial Hospital	Butler	Butler	296	12	Non-profit	General acute	Independence Health System	—	Announced sale to WVU Health System
Cancer Treatment Centers of America	Philadelphia	Philadelphia	74	5	For-profit	General acute	Independent	—	Closed
Canonsburg Hospital	Canonsburg	Washington	104	4	Non-profit	General acute	Allegheny Health Network	—	—
Chan Soon-Shiong Medical Center at Windber	Windber	Somerset	54	4	Non-profit	General acute	Independent	—	—
Chester County Hospital	West Chester	Chester	329	12	Non-profit	General acute	University of Pennsylvania Health System	10	—
Chestnut Hill Hospital	Philadelphia	Philadelphia	148	8	For-profit	General acute	Temple Health	—	Became part of Temple Health on January 1, 2023
Children's Home of Pittsburgh	Pittsburgh	Allegheny	30	—	Non-profit	General acute specialty	Independent	—	—
Children's Hospital of Philadelphia	Philadelphia	Philadelphia	535	20	Non-profit	General acute specialty	The Children's Hospital Foundation	—	—
Children's Hospital of Philadelphia King of Prussia	King of Prussia	Montgomery	52	4	Non-profit	General acute specialty	The Children's Hospital Foundation	—	—
Children's Institute of Pittsburgh	Pittsburgh	Allegheny	62	0	Non-profit	Rehabilitation	Independent	—	—
Clarks Summit State Hospital	Clarks Summit	Lackawanna	210	0	State	Psychiatric	Independent	—	—
Clarion Hospital	Clarion	Clarion	70	4	Non-profit	General acute	Independence Health System	—	Announced sale to WVU Health System
Clarion Psychiatric Center	Clarion	Clarion	76	0	For-profit	Psychiatric	Universal Health Services	—	—
Coatesville Veterans Affairs Medical Center	Coatesville	Chester	0	—	Federal	VA hospital	Veterans Integrated Service Network 4	—	—
Conemaugh Memorial Medical Center	Johnstown	Cambria	470	20	For-profit	General acute	Duke Lifepoint Healthcare	—	—
Conemaugh Meyersdale Medical Center	Meyersdale	Somerset	20	2	For-profit	General acute	Duke Lifepoint Healthcare	—	—
Conemaugh Miners Medical Center	Hastings	Cambria	25	3	For-profit	General acute	Duke Lifepoint Healthcare	—	—
Conemaugh Nason Medical Center	Roaring Spring	Blair	45	3	For-profit	General acute	Duke Lifepoint Healthcare	—	—
Crichton Rehabilitation Center	Johnstown	Cambria	39	0	For-profit	Rehabilitation	Duke Lifepoint Healthcare	—	—
Crozer-Chester Medical Center	Chester	Delaware	439	24	For-profit	General acute	Prospect Medical Holdings	—	Closed May 2, 2025
Curahealth Heritage Valley	Beaver	Beaver	35	2	For-profit	Long-term acute care	Independent	—	Now part of Curahealth
Danville State Hospital	Danville	Montour	161	0	State	Psychiatric	Independent	—	—
Delaware County Memorial Hospital	Drexel Hill	Delaware	168	10	For-profit	General acute	Prospect Medical Holdings	—	Closed November 5, 2022
Department of Veterans Affairs Medical Center-Erie	Erie	Erie	0	—	Federal	VA hospital	Veterans Integrated Service Network 4	—	—
Department of Veterans Affairs Medical Center-Lebanon	Lebanon	Lebanon	0	—	Federal	VA hospital	Veterans Integrated Service Network 4	—	—
Department of Veterans Affairs Medical Center-Philadelphia	Philadelphia	Philadelphia	0	—	Federal	VA hospital	Veterans Integrated Service Network 4	—	—
Department of Veterans Affairs Medical Center-Wilkes Barre	Wilkes-Barre	Luzerne	0	—	Federal	VA hospital	Veterans Integrated Service Network 4	—	—
Devereux Foundation	Malvern	Chester	49	0	Non-profit	Psychiatric	Independent	—	—
Penn Medicine Doylestown Health	Doylestown	Bucks	232	9	For-profit	General acute	University of Pennsylvania Health System	13	—
Eagleville Hospital	Eagleville	Montgomery	83	0	Non-profit	Drug & alcohol	Independent	—	—
Edgewood Surgical Hospital	Transfer	Mercer	10	4	For-profit	General acute	Independent	—	—
Einstein Medical Center Montgomery	East Norriton Township	Montgomery	171	6	Non-profit	General acute	Jefferson Health	—	Announced merger with Jefferson Health.
Einstein Medical Center-Philadelphia	Philadelphia	Philadelphia	750	23	Non-profit	General acute	Jefferson Health	—	Announced merger with Jefferson Health.
Ellwood Medical Center	Ellwood City	Lawrence	62	4	Non-profit	General acute	Independent	—	—
Encompass Health Rehabilitation Hospital of Altoona	Altoona	Blair	80	0	For-profit	Rehabilitation	Encompass Health	—	—
Encompass Health Rehabilitation Hospital of Erie	Erie	Erie	108	0	For-profit	Rehabilitation	Encompass Health	—	—
Encompass Health Rehabilitation Hospital of Harmarville	Pittsburgh	Allegheny	162	0	For-profit	Rehabilitation	Encompass Health	—	—
Encompass Health Rehabilitation Hospital of Mechanicsburg	Mechanicsburg	Cumberland	75	0	For-profit	Rehabilitation	Encompass Health	—	—
Encompass Health Rehabilitation Hospital of Nittany Valley	Pleasant Gap	Centre	73	0	For-profit	Rehabilitation	Encompass Health	—	—
Encompass Health Rehabilitation Hospital of Reading	Reading	Berks	60	0	For-profit	Rehabilitation	Encompass Health	—	—
Encompass Health Rehabilitation Hospital of Sewickley	Sewickley	Allegheny	44	0	For-profit	Rehabilitation	Encompass Health	—	—
Encompass Health Rehabilitation Hospital of York	York	York	90	0	For-profit	Rehabilitation	Encompass Health	—	—
Endless Mountains Health Systems	Montrose	Susquehanna	25	2	Non-profit	General acute	Independent	—	—
WellSpan Evangelical Community Hospital	Lewisburg	Union	132	8	Non-profit	General acute	WellSpan Health	—	Joined WellSpan Health
Frick Hospital	Mount Pleasant	Westmoreland	33	4	Non-profit	General acute	Independence Health System	—	Announced sale to WVU Health System
Westmoreland Hospital	Greensburg	Westmoreland	373	11	Non-profit	General acute	Independence Health System	—	Announced sale to WVU Health System
Fairmount Behavioral Health System	Philadelphia	Philadelphia	239	0	For-profit	Psychiatric	Universal Health Services	—	—
First Hospital Wyoming Valley	Kingston	Luzerne	149	0	For-profit	Psychiatric	Community Health Systems	26	—
Forbes Hospital	Monroeville	Allegheny	315	12	Non-profit	General acute	Allegheny Health Network	—	—
Foundations Behavioral Health	Doylestown	Bucks	60	0	For-profit	Psychiatric	Universal Health Services	—	—
Fox Chase Cancer Center	Philadelphia	Philadelphia	100	8	Non-profit	General acute specialty	Temple University Health System	—	—
Friends Hospital	Philadelphia	Philadelphia	192	0	For-profit	Psychiatric	Universal Health Services	—	—
Fulton County Medical Center	McConnellsburg	Fulton	21	1	Non-profit	General acute	Independent	—	—
Geisinger Community Medical Center	Scranton	Lackawanna	293	14	Non-profit	General acute	Geisinger	—	—
Geisinger Encompass Health Rehabilitation Hospital	Danville	Montour	42	0	For-profit	Rehabilitation	Encompass Health	—	—
Geisinger Jersey Shore Hospital	Jersey Shore	Lycoming	25	3	Non-profit	General acute	Geisinger	—	—
Geisinger Medical Center	Danville	Montour	540	39	Non-profit	General acute	Geisinger	17	—
Geisinger Wyoming Valley Medical Center	Wilkes-Barre	Luzerne	276	12	Non-profit	General acute	Geisinger	26	—
Geisinger-Bloomsburg Hospital	Bloomsburg	Columbia	72	5	Non-profit	General acute	Geisinger	—	—
Geisinger-Lewistown Hospital	Lewistown	Mifflin	123	6	Non-profit	General acute	Geisinger	—	—
Geisinger Medical Center Muncy	Muncy	Lycoming	20	?	Non-profit	General acute	Geisinger	—	—
Geisinger-Shamokin Area Community Hospital	Shamokin	Northumberland	48	0	Non-profit	General acute	Geisinger	—	—
Geisinger St. Luke's Hospital	Orwigsburg	Schuylkill	80	?	Non-profit	General acute	Geisinger and St. Luke's	—	—
Penn Medicine | Good Shepherd Rehabilitation Specialty Hospital	Philadelphia	Philadelphia	18	0	Non-profit	Long-term acute care	GSPP Rehabilitation	—	—
Penn Medicine Rehabilitation (an inpatient rehabilitation unit of the Hospital of the University of Pennsylvania)	Philadelphia	Philadelphia	58	0	Non-profit	Rehabilitation	GSPP Rehabilitation		
Good Shepherd Rehabilitation Hospital	Center Valley	Lehigh	76	0	Non-profit	Rehabilitation	Good Shepherd Rehabilitation	—	—
Good Shepherd Rehabilitation Hospital Pediatric Unit	Bethlehem	Lehigh	20	0	Non-profit	Rehabilitation	Good Shepherd Rehabilitation	—	—
Good Shepherd Specialty Hospital	Bethlehem	Lehigh	16	0	Non-profit	Long-term acute care	Good Shepherd Rehabilitation	—	—
Grand View Health	Sellersville	Bucks	194	12	Non-profit	General acute	St. Luke's Health Network	—	—
Guthrie Robert Packer Hospital	Sayre	Bradford	254	19	Non-profit	General acute	Guthrie Clinic	—	—
Guthrie Towanda Memorial Hospital	Towanda	Bradford	35	3	Non-profit	General acute	Guthrie Clinic	—	—
Guthrie Troy Community Hospital	Troy	Bradford	25	2	Non-profit	General acute	Guthrie Clinic	—	—
Hahnemann University Hospital	Philadelphia	Philadelphia	496	24	For-profit	General acute	American Academic Health System	—	Closed September 6, 2019
Haven Behavioral Hospital of Eastern Pennsylvania	Reading	Berks	67	0	For-profit	Psychiatric	Haven Behavioral Healthcare	—	—
Haven Behavioral Hospital of Philadelphia	Philadelphia	Philadelphia	36	0	For-profit	Psychiatric	Haven Behavioral Healthcare	—	—
Helen M. Simpson Rehabilitation Hospital	Harrisburg	Dauphin	55	0	For-profit	Rehabilitation	Select Medical	—	—
Heritage Valley Beaver	Beaver	Beaver	285	14	Non-profit	General acute	Heritage Valley Health System	—	Announced merger with Allegheny Health Network
Heritage Valley Kennedy	Kennedy Township	Allegheny	124	6	Non-profit	General acute	Heritage Valley Health System	—	Closed
Heritage Valley Sewickley	Sewickley	Allegheny	176	8	Non-profit	General acute	Heritage Valley Health System	—	Announced merger with Allegheny Health Network
Holy Redeemer Hospital	Meadowbrook	Montgomery	242	11	Non-profit	General acute	Holy Redeemer Health System	—	—
Horsham Clinic	Ambler	Montgomery	206	0	For-profit	Psychiatric	Universal Health Services	—	—
Hospital of the University of Pennsylvania	Philadelphia	Philadelphia	790	37	Non-profit	General acute	University of Pennsylvania Health System	1	—
Hospital of the University of Pennsylvania – Cedar Avenue	Philadelphia	Philadelphia	157	5	Non-profit	General acute	Trinity Health	—	Formerly known as - Mercy Philadelphia Hospital & Misericordia Hospital
Indiana Regional Medical Center	Indiana	Indiana	166	7	Non-profit	General acute	Independent	—	—
James E. Van Zandt Veterans Affairs Medical Center	Altoona	Blair	0	—	Federal	VA hospital	Veterans Integrated Service Network 4	—	—
Jeanes Hospital	Philadelphia	Philadelphia	146	9	Non-profit	General acute	Temple University Health System	—	—
Jefferson Abington Hospital	Abington	Montgomery	655	23	Non-profit	General acute	Jefferson Health	12	—
Jefferson Health Northeast	Philadelphia	Philadelphia	464	29	Non-profit	General acute	Jefferson Health	26	—
Jefferson Hospital	Pittsburgh	Allegheny	341	13	Non-profit	General acute	Allegheny Health Network	—	—
Jefferson Lansdale Hospital	Lansdale	Montgomery	140	7	Non-profit	General acute	Jefferson Health	—	—
John Heinz Institute of Rehab Medicine	Wilkes-Barre	Luzerne	61	0	Non-profit	Rehabilitation	Allied Services Institute of Rehab Medicine	—	—
Kensington Hospital	Philadelphia	Philadelphia	45	0	Non-profit	General acute	Independent	—	—
KidsPeace	Orefield	Lehigh	120	0	Non-profit	Psychiatric	Independent	—	—
Kindred Hospital Philadelphia	Philadelphia	Philadelphia	52	0	For-profit	Long-term acute care	Kindred Healthcare	—	—
Kindred Hospital Philadelphia - Havertown	Havertown	Delaware	57	0	For-profit	Long-term acute care	Kindred Healthcare	—	—
Kindred Hospital Pittsburgh	Oakdale	Allegheny	63	0	For-profit	Long-term acute care	Kindred Healthcare	—	Now Curahealth
Kindred Hospital South Philadelphia	Philadelphia	Philadelphia	58	0	For-profit	Long-term acute care	Kindred Healthcare	—	—
Kirkbride Center	Philadelphia	Philadelphia	25	0	For-profit	Psychiatric	Independent	—	—
Latrobe Hospital	Latrobe	Westmoreland	172	9	Non-profit	General acute	Independence Health System	—	Announced sale to WVU Health System
Lancaster General Hospital	Lancaster	Lancaster	604	40	Non-profit	General acute	University of Pennsylvania Health System	4	—
Lancaster Rehabilitation Hospital	Lancaster	Lancaster	59	0	For-profit	Rehabilitation	University of Pennsylvania Health System	—	—
Lankenau Medical Center	Wynnewood	Montgomery	370	19	Non-profit	General acute	Main Line Health/Main Line Hospitals	10	—
LECOM Health - Corry Memorial Hospital	Corry	Erie	20	2	Non-profit	General acute	LECOM Health - Millcreek Community Hospital	—	—
LECOM Health - Millcreek Community Hospital	Erie	Erie	144	4	Non-profit	General acute	LECOM Health - Millcreek Community Hospital	—	—
Lehigh Valley Hospital–Cedar Crest	Allentown	Lehigh	877	46	Non-profit	General acute	Lehigh Valley Health Network	6	—
Lehigh Valley Hospital - Hazelton	Hazleton	Luzerne	150	6	Non-profit	General acute	Lehigh Valley Health Network	—	—
Lehigh Valley Hospital - Muhlenberg	Bethlehem	Lehigh	194	8	Non-profit	General acute	Lehigh Valley Health Network	—	—
Lehigh Valley Hospital - Pocono	East Stroudsburg	Monroe	239	11	Non-profit	General acute	Lehigh Valley Health Network	—	—
Lehigh Valley Hospital - Schuylkill East Norwegian Street	Pottsville	Schuylkill	126	8	Non-profit	General acute	Lehigh Valley Health Network	—	—
Lehigh Valley Hospital - Schuylkill South Jackson Street	Pottsville	Schuylkill	179	11	Non-profit	General acute	Lehigh Valley Health Network	—	—
Lifecare Behavioral Health Hospital	Pittsburgh	Allegheny	49	0	For-profit	Psychiatric	Independent	—	—
Lifecare Hospital of Chester County	West Chester	Chester	39	0	For-profit	Long-term acute care	Independent	—	—
Lifecare Hospital of Mechanicsburg	Mechanicsburg	Cumberland	68	0	For-profit	Long-term acute care	Independent	—	—
Lifecare Hospital of Pittsburgh	Pittsburgh	Allegheny	80	0	For-profit	Long-term acute care	Independent	—	—
Lower Bucks Hospital	Bristol	Bucks	175	6	For-profit	General acute	Prime Healthcare Services	—	—
Magee Rehabilitation Hospital	Philadelphia	Philadelphia	96	0	Non-profit	Rehabilitation	Jefferson Health	—	—
Meadows Psychiatric Center	Centre Hall	Centre	107	0	For-profit	Psychiatric	Universal Health Services	—	—
Meadville Medical Center	Meadville	Crawford	217	12	Non-profit	General acute	Meadville Medical Center	—	—
Mercy Fitzgerald Hospital	Darby	Delaware	174	9	Non-profit	General acute	Trinity Health	—	—
Montgomery County Emergency Service	Norristown	Montgomery	81	0	Non-profit	Psychiatric	Independent	—	—
Moses Taylor Hospital	Scranton	Lackawanna	213	7	For-profit	General acute	Community Health Systems	—	—
Mount Nittany Medical Center	State College	Centre	260	12	Non-profit	General acute	Mount Nittany Health	17	—
Nazareth Hospital	Philadelphia	Philadelphia	203	9	Non-profit	General acute	Trinity Health	—	—
New Lifecare Hospitals of PGH - Alle-Kiski	Natrona	Allegheny	35	0	For-profit	Long-term acute care	Independent	—	—
New Lifecare Hospitals of PGH - Suburban	Pittsburgh	Allegheny	32	0	For-profit	Long-term acute care	Independent	—	—
Norristown State Hospital	Norristown	Montgomery	259	0	State	Psychiatric	Independent	—	—
OSS Health	York	York	26	8	For-profit	General acute specialty	Independent	—	—
Paoli Hospital	Paoli	Chester	231	14	Non-profit	General acute	Main Line Health/Main Line Hospitals	—	—
Penn Highlands Brookville	Brookville	Jefferson	35	3	Non-profit	General acute	Penn Highlands Healthcare	—	—
Penn Highlands Clearfield	Clearfield	Clearfield	96	5	Non-profit	General acute	Penn Highlands Healthcare	—	—
Penn Highlands Connellsville	Connellsville	Fayette	64	4	Non-profit	General acute	Penn Highlands Healthcare	—	Acquired by Penn Highlands Healthcare on April 1, 2022
Penn Highlands DuBois	DuBois	Clearfield	219	11	Non-profit	General acute	Penn Highlands Healthcare	—	—
Penn Highlands Elk	St. Marys	Elk	35	6	Non-profit	General acute	Penn Highlands Healthcare	—	—
Penn Highlands Huntingdon	Huntingdon	Huntingdon	62	4	Non-profit	General acute	Penn Highlands Healthcare	—	Acquired by Penn Highlands Healthcare in 2019
Penn Highlands Mon Valley	Monongahela	Washington	200	13	Non-profit	General acute	Penn Highlands Healthcare	—	Acquired by Penn Highlands Healthcare October 1, 2021
Penn Highlands State College	State College	Centre	29	3	Non-profit	General acute	Penn Highlands Healthcare	—	—
Penn Highlands Tyrone	Tyrone	Blair	25	3	Non-profit	General acute	Penn Highlands Healthcare	—	Acquired by Penn Highlands Healthcare November 1, 2020
Penn Presbyterian Medical Center	Philadelphia	Philadelphia	350	20	Non-profit	General acute	University of Pennsylvania Health System	—	—
Penn State Health Holy Spirit Medical Center	Camp Hill	Cumberland	307	18	Non-profit	General acute	Penn State Health	—	—
Penn State Health Milton S. Hershey Medical Center	Hershey	Dauphin	548	34	Non-profit	General acute	Penn State Health	4	—
Penn State Health Rehabilitation Hospital	Hummelstown	Dauphin	76	0	For-profit	Rehabilitation	Independent	—	Collaboration between Penn State Health and Select Medical
Penn State Health St. Joseph Medical Center	Reading	Berks	204	9	Non-profit	General acute	Penn State Health	—	—
Pennsylvania Hospital	Philadelphia	Philadelphia	461	28	Non-profit	General acute	University of Pennsylvania Health System	8	—
Pennsylvania Psychiatric Institute	Harrisburg	Dauphin	89	0	Non-profit	Psychiatric	Independent	—	Collaboration between Penn State Health and UPMC
Philhaven	Mt. Gretna	Lebanon	103	0	Non-profit	Psychiatric	WellSpan Health	—	—
Phoenixville Hospital	Phoenixville	Chester	151	8	For-profit	General acute	Tower Health	—	—
Physicians Care Surgical Hospital	Royersford	Montgomery	12	5	For-profit	General acute	Independent	—	—
Pottstown Hospital	Pottstown	Montgomery	232	9	For-profit	General acute	Tower Health	—	—
Punxsutawney Area Hospital	Punxsutawney	Jefferson	49	5	Non-profit	General acute	Independent	—	—
Reading Hospital	Reading	Berks	714	27	Non-profit	General acute	Tower Health	13	—
Regional Hospital of Scranton	Scranton	Lackawanna	186	9	For-profit	General acute	Community Health Systems	—	—
Riddle Hospital	Media	Delaware	204	12	Non-profit	General acute	Main Line Health/Main Line Hospitals	23	—
Rothman Orthopaedic Specialty Hospital	Bensalem	Bucks	24	6	For-profit	General acute specialty	Independent	—	—
Roxborough Memorial Hospital	Philadelphia	Philadelphia	141	4	For-profit	General acute	Prime Healthcare Services	—	—
Roxbury Treatment Center	Shippensburg	Franklin	112	0	For-profit	Psychiatric	Universal Health Services	—	—
Saint John Vianney Hospital	Downingtown	Chester	50	0	Non-profit	Psychiatric	Independent	—	—
SCI-Waymart Forensic Treatment Center	Waymart	Wayne	90	0	State	Psychiatric	Independent	—	—
Select Specialty Hospital - Camp Hill	Camp Hill	Cumberland	31	0	For-profit	Long-term acute care	Select Medical	—	—
Select Specialty Hospital - Danville	Danville	Montour	30	0	For-profit	Long-term acute care	Select Medical	—	—
Select Specialty Hospital - Erie	Erie	Erie	50	0	For-profit	Long-term acute care	Select Medical	—	—
Select Specialty Hospital - Harrisburg	Harrisburg	Dauphin	38	0	For-profit	Long-term acute care	Select Medical	—	—
Select Specialty Hospital - Johnstown	Johnstown	Cambria	39	0	For-profit	Long-term acute care	Select Medical	—	—
Select Specialty Hospital - Laurel Highlands	Latrobe	Westmoreland	40	0	For-profit	Long-term acute care	Select Medical	—	—
Select Specialty Hospital - McKeesport	McKeesport	Allegheny	30	0	For-profit	Long-term acute care	Select Medical	—	—
Select Specialty Hospital - Pittsburgh UPMC	Pittsburgh	Allegheny	32	0	For-profit	Long-term acute care	Select Medical	—	—
Select Specialty Hospital - York	York	York	23	0	For-profit	Long-term acute care	Select Medical	—	—
Sharon Regional Medical Center	Sharon	Mercer	220	12	For-profit	General acute	Steward Health Care System	—	—
Shriners Hospitals for Children - Philadelphia	Philadelphia	Philadelphia	53	3	Non-profit	General acute specialty	Independent	—	—
Southwood Psychiatric Hospital	Pittsburgh	Allegheny	68	0	For-profit	Psychiatric	Independent	—	—
Special Care Hospital	Wilkes-Barre	Luzerne	66	0	For-profit	Long-term acute care	Independent	—	—
St. Christopher's Hospital for Children	Philadelphia	Philadelphia	189	11	Non-profit	General acute specialty	Tower Health & Drexel University	—	Purchased by Tower Health and Drexel University December 15, 2019
St. Clair Hospital	Pittsburgh	Allegheny	328	13	Non-profit	General acute	Independent	17	—
St. Luke's Anderson Campus	Easton	Northampton	108	4	Non-profit	General acute	St. Luke's University Health Network	—	—
St. Luke's Bethlehem Campus	Bethlehem	Lehigh	550	21	Non-profit	General acute	St. Luke's University Health Network	6	—
St Luke's Easton Campus	Easton	Northampton	254	10	For-profit	General acute	St. Luke's University Health Network	—	Acquired by St. Luke's University Health Network in 2020
St. Luke's Lehighton Campus	Lehighton	Carbon	159	6	Non-profit	General acute	St. Luke's University Health Network	—	—
St. Luke's Miners Campus	Coaldale	Schuylkill	44	3	Non-profit	General acute	St. Luke's University Health Network	—	—
St. Luke's Quakertown Campus	Quakertown	Bucks	62	3	Non-profit	General acute	St. Luke's University Health Network	—	—
St. Luke's Sacred Heart Campus	Allentown	Lehigh	148	13	Non-profit	General acute	St. Luke's University Health Network	—	Now part of St. Luke's University Health Network
St. Mary Medical Center	Langhorne	Bucks	373	19	Non-profit	General acute	Trinity Health	17	—
St. Mary Rehabilitation Hospital	Langhorne	Bucks	50	0	For-profit	Rehabilitation	Trinity Health	—	—
Suburban Community Hospital	East Norriton Township	Montgomery	126	6	Non-profit	General acute	Prime Healthcare Services	—	Closed July 1, 2025
Surgical Institute of Reading	Wyomissing	Berks	15	4	For-profit	General acute specialty	Independent	—	—
Surgical Specialty Center at Coordinated Health	Bethlehem	Northampton	20	—	For-profit	General acute	Independent	—	—
Surgical Specialty Hospital-Coordinated Hlth	Allentown	Lehigh	20	6	For-profit	General acute	Independent	—	—
Taylor Hospital	Ridley Park	Delaware	213	3	For-profit	General acute	Prospect Medical Holdings	—	Closed April 26, 2025
Temple University Hospital	Philadelphia	Philadelphia	733	23	Non-profit	General acute	Temple University Health System	—	—
Thomas Jefferson University Hospital	Philadelphia	Philadelphia	937	63	Non-profit	General acute	Jefferson Health	3	—
Titusville Area Hospital	Titusville	Crawford	25	4	Non-profit	General acute	Meadville Medical Center	—	—
Torrance State Hospital	Torrance	Westmoreland	356	0	State	Psychiatric	Independent	—	—
Tyler Memorial Hospital	Tunkhannock	Wyoming	44	3	For-profit	General acute	Community Health Systems	—	—
UPMC Altoona	Altoona	Blair	361	17	Non-profit	General acute	UPMC	—	—
UPMC Bedford	Everett	Bedford	49	4	Non-profit	General acute	UPMC	—	—
UPMC Carlisle	Carlisle	Cumberland	159	7	For-profit	General acute	UPMC	—	Now non-profit
UPMC Children's Hospital of Pittsburgh	Pittsburgh	Allegheny	315	13	Non-profit	General acute specialty	UPMC	—	—
UPMC Cole	Coudersport	Potter	59	4	Non-profit	General acute	UPMC	—	—
UPMC Community Osteopathic	Harrisburg	Dauphin	145	14	Non-profit	General acute	UPMC	9	—
UPMC East	Monroeville	Allegheny	155	7	Non-profit	General acute	UPMC	—	—
UPMC Hamot	Erie	Erie	423	22	Non-profit	General acute	UPMC	—	—
UPMC Hanover	Hanover	York	93	10	Non-profit	General acute	UPMC	—	—
UPMC Harrisburg	Harrisburg	Dauphin	627	36	Non-profit	General acute	UPMC	9	—
UPMC Horizon	Greenville	Mercer	158	11	Non-profit	General acute	UPMC	—	—
UPMC Jameson	New Castle	Lawrence	207	10	Non-profit	General acute	UPMC	—	—
UPMC Kane	Kane	McKean	31	3	Non-profit	General acute	UPMC	—	—
UPMC Lititz	Lititz	Lancaster	148	6	For-profit	General acute	UPMC	—	Now non-profit
UPMC Lock Haven	Lock Haven	Clinton	47	4	For-profit	General acute	UPMC	—	—
UPMC Magee-Womens Hospital	Pittsburgh	Allegheny	383	14	Non-profit	Maternity	UPMC	—	—
UPMC McKeesport	McKeesport	Allegheny	222	11	Non-profit	General acute	UPMC	—	—
UPMC Memorial	York	York	100	5	For-profit	General acute	UPMC	—	—
UPMC Mercy	Pittsburgh	Allegheny	495	23	Non-profit	General acute	UPMC	—	—
UPMC Muncy	Muncy	Lycoming	20	3	Non-profit	General acute	UPMC	—	—
UPMC Northwest	Seneca	Venango	158	8	Non-profit	General acute	UPMC	—	—
UPMC Passavant	Pittsburgh	Allegheny	423	25	Non-profit	General acute	UPMC	13	—
UPMC Presbyterian	Pittsburgh	Allegheny	1577	77	Non-profit	General acute	UPMC	2	—
UPMC Shadyside	Pittsburgh	Allegheny	520		Non-profit	General acute	UPMC	2	—
UPMC Somerset	Somerset	Somerset	111	5	Non-profit	General acute	UPMC	—	Merged with UPMC on February 1, 2019.
UPMC St. Margaret	Pittsburgh	Allegheny	248	13	Non-profit	General acute	UPMC	17	—
UPMC Wellsboro	Wellsboro	Tioga	25	6	Non-profit	General acute	UPMC	—	—
UPMC West Shore	Mechanicsburg	Cumberland	150	10	Non-profit	General acute	UPMC	9	—
UPMC Western Psychiatric Hospital	Pittsburgh	Allegheny	263	0	Non-profit	Psychiatric	UPMC	—	—
UPMC Williamsport	Williamsport	Lycoming	224	20	Non-profit	General acute	UPMC	—	—
UPMC Williamsport Divine Providence Campus	Williamsport	Lycoming	31	6	Non-profit	Psychiatric	UPMC	—	—
Valley Forge Medical Center & Hospital	Norristown	Montgomery	50	0	For-profit	Drug & alcohol	Independent	—	—
Veterans Affairs Pittsburgh Healthcare System	Pittsburgh	Allegheny	0	—	Federal	VA hospital	Veterans Integrated Service Network 4	—	—
Warren General Hospital	Warren	Warren	85	4	Non-profit	General acute	Independent	—	announced affiliation with Allegheny Health Network and LECOM Health (minority interests)
Warren State Hospital	North Warren	Warren	152	0	State	Psychiatric	Independent	—	—
UPMC Washington	Washington	Washington	260	8	Non-profit	General acute	UPMC	—	—
UPMC Greene	Waynesburg	Greene	49	3	Non-profit	General acute	UPMC	—	—
Wayne Memorial Hospital	Honesdale	Wayne	112	3	Non-profit	General acute	Independent	—	—
WellSpan Chambersburg Hospital	Chambersburg	Franklin	258	11	Non-profit	General acute	WellSpan Health	23	Merged with WellSpan on November 1, 2018
WellSpan Ephrata Community Hospital	Ephrata	Lancaster	130	11	Non-profit	General acute	WellSpan Health	—	—
WellSpan Gettysburg Hospital	Gettysburg	Adams	76	5	Non-profit	General acute	WellSpan Health	—	—
WellSpan Good Samaritan Hospital	Lebanon	Lebanon	170	11	Non-profit	General acute	WellSpan Health	26	—
WellSpan Surgery & Rehabilitation Hospital	York	York	73	4	Non-profit	Rehabilitation	WellSpan Health	—	—
WellSpan Waynesboro Hospital	Waynesboro	Franklin	56	4	Non-profit	General acute	WellSpan Health	—	Merged with WellSpan on November 1, 2018
WellSpan York Hospital	York	York	580	18	Non-profit	General acute	WellSpan Health	17	—
Wernersville State Hospital	Wernersville	Berks	266	0	State	Psychiatric	Independent	—	—
West Penn Hospital	Pittsburgh	Allegheny	317	19	Non-profit	General acute	Allegheny Health Network	—	—
Wilkes-Barre General Hospital	Wilkes-Barre	Luzerne	412	15	For-profit	General acute	Community Health Systems	—	—
Wills Eye Hospital	Philadelphia	Philadelphia	4	8	City	Eye, ear, nose & throat	Independent	—	—
WVU Medicine Uniontown Hospital	Uniontown	Fayette	171	8	Non-profit	General acute	WVU Medicine	—	Merged with WVU Medicine in September 2020

== Hospitals planned or under construction ==
The following list of new hospitals are those that have been announced as planned or are currently under construction as of August 28, 2019. This list represents new hospital locations or campuses and does not include the expansion or replacement of existing hospital facilities.

Date	City	County	Beds	Type	Health system	Ref
2018 (start)	Milford Township	Bucks	40	General acute	St. Luke's University Health Network	
2018 (start)	Tannersville	Monroe	?	General acute	Lehigh Valley Health Network	
2019 (open)	Brentwood	Allegheny	10	General acute	Allegheny Health Network	
2019 (open)	Hempfield Township	Westmoreland	10	General acute	Allegheny Health Network	
2019 (open)	Harmar Township	Allegheny	10	General acute	Allegheny Health Network	
2019 (open)	McCandless	Allegheny	10	General acute	Allegheny Health Network	
2019 (start)	Hampden Township	Cumberland	108	General acute	Penn State Health	
2020 (start)	Hempfield Township	Lancaster	120	General acute	Penn State Health	
2021 (open)	Pine Township	Allegheny	160	General acute	Allegheny Health Network	
2021 (open)	King of Prussia	Montgomery	52	General acute specialty	The Children's Hospital Foundation	
2021 (open)	Jefferson Hills	Allegheny	63	General acute	UPMC	
2021 (open)	Pittsburgh	Allegheny	?	General acute specialty	UPMC	
2023 (open)	Pittsburgh	Allegheny	180	General acute specialty	UPMC	
2023 (open)	Pittsburgh	Allegheny	620	General acute specialty	UPMC	

== See also ==
- List of hospitals in Philadelphia
- List of hospitals in Pittsburgh
