= Memorial Hospital =

Memorial Hospital may refer to:

== United Kingdom ==
- Memorial Hospital, Woolwich
- Scunthorpe General Hospital, Lincolnshire, previously known as the Scunthorpe and District War Memorial Hospital

== United States ==
- CommonSpirit Memorial Hospital, Chattanooga, Tennessee
- Memorial Hospital (Cumberland), in Cumberland, Maryland, opened 1888, closed 2009
- Guthrie Towanda Memorial Hospital, formerly known as simply Memorial Hospital
- Memorial Hospital (New York City, New York), a former hospital in New York City
- Memorial Hospital of Rhode Island
- Memorial Hospital of South Bend in South Bend, Indiana
- Ochsner Baptist Medical Center (New Orleans), formerly known as Memorial Medical Center

== Other countries ==
- Memorial Hospital, North Adelaide, South Australia, owned by Adelaide Community Healthcare Alliance

== See also ==
- Memorial Medical Center (disambiguation)
