= Penn Highlands Healthcare =

Healthcare organization in Pennsylvania

- Type: 501(c)(3) nonprofit
- Industry: Health care
- Founded: September 30, 2011; 14 years ago
- Headquarters: DuBois, Pennsylvania, United States
- Number of locations: 9 hospitals >150 clinics and offices
- Area served: Western Pennsylvania, Central Pennsylvania
- Key people: Steven Fontaine (CEO)
- Revenue: ▲$937.4 million (2024)
- Operating income: ▼−$36.4 million (2024)
- Number of employees: 6,200 (2024)
- Website: phhealthcare.org

Penn Highlands (PH) Healthcare is an organization based in DuBois, Pennsylvania that was founded in 2011. The organization originally linked three hospitals in DuBois, Brookville, and Clearfield, and grew to nine hospitals in Western and Central Pennsylvania. Penn Highlands also provides services for at least 26 counties including primary, home, and urgent care.

Some hospitals acquired by PH have operated for over 100 years, while Penn Highlands opened a brand new hospital in State College in 2024. Penn Highlands has multiple senior care services based in Brookville. Penn Highlands experienced significant operating losses in 2023 and 2024, as did some other healthcare providers in Western Pennsylvania including Allegheny Health Network (AHN) and University of Pittsburgh Medical Center (UPMC).

== Facilities ==
=== Brookville ===
Brookville Hospital was established in 1915. It was a founding location of Penn Highlands in 2011, and its name was changed to Penn Highlands Brookville in 2014.

Penn Highlands Jefferson Manor is a senior care center also located in Brookville. Penn Highlands WRC Senior Services is based in Brookville and has origins in the late 1800s as the Woman's Relief Corps. Penn Highlands became affiliated with WRC in 2022 and operates facilities in multiple counties.

=== Connellsville ===
The former Highlands Hospital merged with Penn Highlands in 2022, becoming Penn Highlands Connellsville. It has operated for over 130 years, and in 2024 the smokestack was illuminated as a beacon. PH Connellsville is one of the city's largest employers.

=== Clearfield ===
Clearfield Hospital was established in 1901. As one of Penn Highlands' founding locations, it was acquired by the organization in 2011 and is a campus of PH DuBois. The name was changed to Penn Highlands Clearfield in 2014.

in 2022, Penn Highlands acquired Clearfield EMS, an ambulance service that has operated since 1932.

=== DuBois ===
Penn Highlands DuBois

Geography
- Location: DuBois, Pennsylvania, United States

Services
- Emergency department: Level II trauma
- Beds: 219

Helipads
- Helipad: FAA LID: PA10
Number	Length		Surface
Number	ft	m	Surface
H1	40	12	Concrete

Links
- Lists: Hospitals in Pennsylvania

Penn Highlands DuBois is located adjacent to the organization's headquarters and hosts the only level II trauma center in Central Northwestern Pennsylvania. Formerly DuBois Regional Medical Center, the hospital was one of the founding locations of Penn Highlands in 2011. DuBois Regional Medical Center was formed in 1985 from a merger of DuBois Hospital and Maple Avenue Hospital, which were founded in 1897 and 1918 respectively.

As a level II trauma center, PH DuBois can sponsor other locations as level IV trauma centers, which Penn Highlands has expressed interest in pursuing with their Elk and State College locations. Penn Highlands estimated that they would treat around 1,100 trauma patients in 2023 at PH DuBois.

In 2024, Penn Highlands and multiple PH hospitals agreed to pay $735,000 to the United States pursuant to a lawsuit. A US attorney alleged that PH DuBois violated the Physician Self-Referral Law from 2009 to 2012, and a whistleblower complaint was filed in 2016.

=== Elk ===
Elk Regional Health Center was formed in 1999 with the joining of Andrew Kaul Memorial Hospital and Elk County General Hospital which were established in 1922 and 1902 respectively. Penn Highlands acquired the hospital in 2013 and changed the name to Penn Highlands Elk in 2014. It is located in St. Marys, Pennsylvania.

In 2024, PH Elk both closed its maternity ward and submitted a letter of intent to become a level IV trauma center. Closure of the maternity ward caused some controversy. Penn Highlands referred Elk County patients to their DuBois location, while some groups consider the area to be a "maternity care desert."

=== Huntingdon ===
Penn Highlands Huntingdon was originally founded in 1911 as J.C. Blair Memorial Hospital. It was acquired by Penn Highlands in 2019. It has around 40 doctors, 400 employees, and 40 active volunteers. PH Huntingdon is the only hospital in Huntingdon County.

=== Mon Valley ===
Penn Highlands Mon Valley (PHMV), formerly Monongahela Valley Hospital, was acquired by Penn Highlands in 2021. It is a 200-bed facility with 225 medical staff and over 40 specialties.

=== State College ===
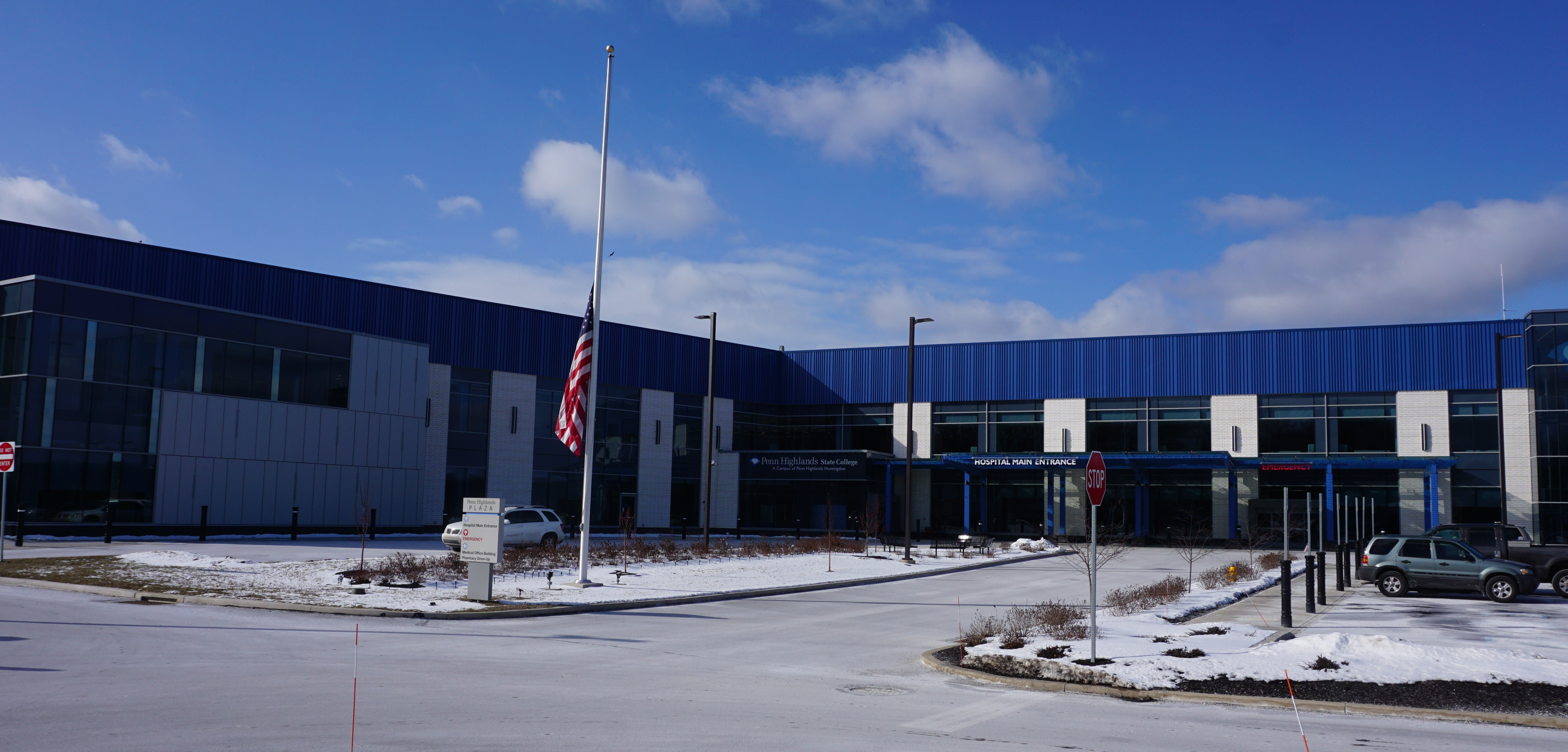
Penn Highlands State College

Penn Highlands State College was built from the ground up for the organization and opened in 2024 as a campus of PH Huntingdon. Sometimes called a "micro-hospital" with private rooms, it has 10 rooms in the emergency department in addition to a trauma room and three operating rooms, 18 inpatient rooms, and 15 outpatient beds. The hospital features imaging and cancer treatment sections. Other services include primary care, walk-in care, and a retail pharmacy in the adjoining medical office building.

Penn Highlands State College joined Mount Nittany Medical Center as the second hospital in Centre County, and it opened as the second hospital in Pennsylvania with a safe haven baby box.

=== Tyrone ===
Penn Highlands Tyrone, formerly Tyrone Hospital, was acquired by Penn Highlands in 2020.

Prior to the hospital's acquisition by PH, Tyrone Regional Health Network and Penn State Health signed letters of intent to become affiliated. In 2020, Tyrone Hospital and a supervising radiologist were ordered to pay $10.83 million after a patient suffered brain damage after experiencing an allergic reaction during an imaging procedure.

== List of hospitals ==
Name	City	County	Licensed beds	Operating rooms	Notes
Penn Highlands Brookville	Brookville	Jefferson	35	3	Founding location
Penn Highlands Clearfield	Clearfield	Clearfield	96	5	Founding location, campus of Penn Highlands DuBois
Penn Highlands Connellsville	Connellsville	Fayette	64	4	Acquired by PH on April 1, 2022
Penn Highlands DuBois	DuBois	Clearfield	219	11	Founding location, level II trauma center
Penn Highlands Elk	St. Marys	Elk	35	6	Acquired by PH on July 1, 2013
Penn Highlands Huntingdon	Huntingdon	Huntingdon	71	4	Acquired by PH in 2019
Penn Highlands Mon Valley	Monongahela	Washington	200	13	Acquired by PH on October 1, 2021
Penn Highlands State College	State College	Centre	29	3	Opened in 2024, campus of Penn Highlands Huntingdon
Penn Highlands Tyrone	Tyrone	Blair	25	3	Acquired by PH on November 1, 2020

== See also ==
- List of hospitals in Pennsylvania
