= Frick Hospital =

- Excela Health

Geography
- Location: 508 South Church Street, Mount Pleasant, Pennsylvania 15666, Northeast United States, Pennsylvania, United States
- Coordinates: 40.1452°N 79.5495°W

Organization
- Type: for profit hospital

Services
- Beds: 102

History
- Founded: ca. 1902

Links
- Website: www.excelahealth.org/patients-and-visitors/hospitals-facilities/hospitals/excela-frick.aspx
- Lists: Hospitals in Pennsylvania

Frick Hospital is a 33-bed hospital in Mount Pleasant, Pennsylvania, United States. Its services include general acute care, surgical services, emergency services, a sleep center, and rehabilitation services. It is owned by Independence Health System. This hospital has many outpatient services.

Excela Health set in motion a five-year renovation project to modernize Frick Hospital. The first phase of the renovation was completed in 2015.

== Frick Hospital rating data ==
The Healthgrades website contains the latest quality data for Excela Health Frick Hospital, as of 2015. For this rating section three different types of data from HealthGrades are presented:

- quality ratings for seventeen inpatient conditions and procedures,
- twelve patient safety indicators, and
- percentage of patients giving the hospital a 9 or 10 (the two highest possible ratings).

For inpatient conditions and procedures, there are three possible ratings: worse than expected, as expected, better than expected. For this hospital the data for this category is:

- Worse than expected – 0
- As expected – 15
- Better than expected – 2

For patient safety indicators, there are the same three possible ratings. All 12 were rated "As expected".

In a patient satisfaction survey, 69% rated the hospital as 9 or 10 (out of 10), the same as the national average.
