= Wilbur H. Haines =

American football player and coach, urologist (1883–1966)

Biographical details
- Born: January 23, 1883; Haddonfield, New Jersey, U.S.
- Died: March 3, 1966 (aged 83); Merion, Pennsylvania, U.S.

Playing career
- 1903–1907: Haverford

Coaching career (HC unless noted)
- 1907–1908: Haverford

Wilbur Hamilton Haines (January 23, 1883 – March 3, 1966) was an American urologist and college football player and coach. He served as the head football coach at Haverford College in 1908.

Haines was later an associate professor of urology at University of Pennsylvania School of Medicine—now known as Perelman School of Medicine. He was affiliated with St. Joseph's Hospital, St. Mary's Hospital, and St. Agnes Hospital in the Philadelphia area. He died on March 3, 1966, at his home in Merion, Pennsylvania.
