= Westmoreland Hospital =

- Excela Health

Geography
- Location: 532 W. Pittsburgh St., Greensburg, Pennsylvania 15601, Northeast United States, Pennsylvania, United States
- Coordinates: 40.3008°N 79.5553°W

Organization
- Type: for profit hospital

Services
- Beds: 373

History
- Opened: 1895

Links
- Website: http://www.excelahealth.org/patients-and-visitors/hospitals-facilities/hospitals/excela-westmoreland.aspx
- Lists: Hospitals in Pennsylvania

Westmoreland Hospital, owned by Excela Health, is an acute-care hospital in central Westmoreland County. It offers a range of inpatient and outpatient services, including an interventional heart center.

== Westmoreland Hospital rating data ==
The HealthGrades website contains the latest quality data for Excela Westmoreland Hospital, as of 2015. For this rating section three different types of data from HealthGrades are presented: quality ratings for thirty-three inpatient conditions and procedures, thirteen patient safety indicators, percentage of patients giving the hospital a 9 or 10 (the two highest possible ratings).

For inpatient conditions and procedures, there are three possible ratings: worse than expected, as expected, better than expected. For this hospital the data for this category is:

- Worse than expected - 1
- As expected - 30
- Better than expected - 2

For patient safety indicators, there are the same three possible ratings. For this hospital safety indicators were rated as:

- Worse than expected - 0
- As expected -11
- Better than expected - 2

Data for patients giving this hospital a 9 or 10 are:

- Patients rating this hospital as a 9 or 10 - 68%
- Patients rating hospitals as a 9 or 10 nationally - 69%
