= Guthrie Troy Community Hospital =

- Guthrie

Geography
- Location: 275 Guthrie Drive, Troy, Pennsylvania, United States
- Coordinates: 41°47′37.1″N 76°47′39.5″W

Organization
- Care system: Private
- Type: Community, Critical Access Hospital

Services
- Emergency department: Level IV trauma center
- Beds: 25

Helipads
Number	Length		Surface
Number	ft	m	Surface
H1	50	15

History
- Founded: 1950

Links
- Website: www.guthrie.org/location/guthrie-troy-community-hospital
- Lists: Hospitals in Pennsylvania

The Guthrie Troy Community Hospital is a community hospital and Level IV Trauma Center in Troy, Pennsylvania.

== History ==
The first hospital was built in 1950 as a 13-bed osteopathic facility. However, its history goes back 6 years before to a remodeled house on King Street opened by Dr. Lawrence Brown, a graduate of the Philadelphia College of Osteopathic Medicine, and Dr. C. H. Couch. A new hospital, the Troy Community Hospital, was planned and opened in 1950 on Elmira Street. It expanded 6 years later to 72 beds with 12 bassinets and was located at 100 John Street. The hospital became part of Guthrie in 1984 and achieved Critical Access Hospital status in 2003. In 2013, a new 25 bed facility was built with an on-site helipad.

The hospital won the 2017 Women's Choice Award for Emergency Care.
