= Wayne Memorial Hospital =

Wayne Memorial Hospital may refer to:

- Wayne Memorial Hospital, Jesup, Georgia
- Wayne Memorial Hospital (Ohio), Greenville, Ohio
- Wayne Memorial Hospital (Pennsylvania), Honesdale, Pennsylvania
- Wayne Memorial Hospital (North Carolina), Goldsboro, North Carolina
