= M. Deborrah Hyde =

American neurosurgeon (born 1949)

- Born: January 18, 1949 (age 77); Laurel, Mississippi, U.S.
- Education: Tougaloo College; Cleveland State University; Case Western Reserve University
- Scientific career
- Fields: Neurosurgery
- Workplaces: Guthrie Robert Packer Hospital

Maxine Deborrah Hyde (born January 18, 1949) is an American neurosurgeon who is the second African American woman certified by the American Board of Neurological Surgery.

== Life ==
Hyde was born January 18, 1949, in Laurel, Mississippi. Ann McDobald and Sellus Hyde were her parents. She was the valedictorian at Oak Park High School. A first generation college student, she earned a B.S. with honors in biology and a minor in chemistry from Tougaloo College in 1969. She completed a M.S. in developmental biology at Cleveland State University in 1973. Her graduate thesis researched the development of maturing rat eyes. Peter Baker was her academic advisor. In her early medical school years, a professor discouraged her by openly comparing her to the "better-prepared" non-minority students. She earned a M.D. from Case Western Reserve University School of Medicine in 1977 and was elected into Alpha Omega Alpha.

Hyde was influenced by her mentor Harold Rekate to pursue neurosurgery. She obtained a neurosurgery training position with Frank Nelson. In 1982, Hyde completed a neurosurgery residency at Case Western, the first female and African American graduate.

Hyde practiced at the Guthrie Robert Packer Hospital. In September 1985, she became the second African American woman to be certified by the American Board of Neurological Surgery. In 1991, she founded the Beacon of Hope Scholarship Foundation to provide assistance to underprivileged students in Laurel, Mississippi and Los Angeles. As of 2023, Hyde had run a private neurosurgery practice in West Hills, Los Angeles for 32 years.
