= Wilkes-Barre General Hospital =

Commonwealth Health Wilkes-Barre General Hospital
- Tenor Health Foundation
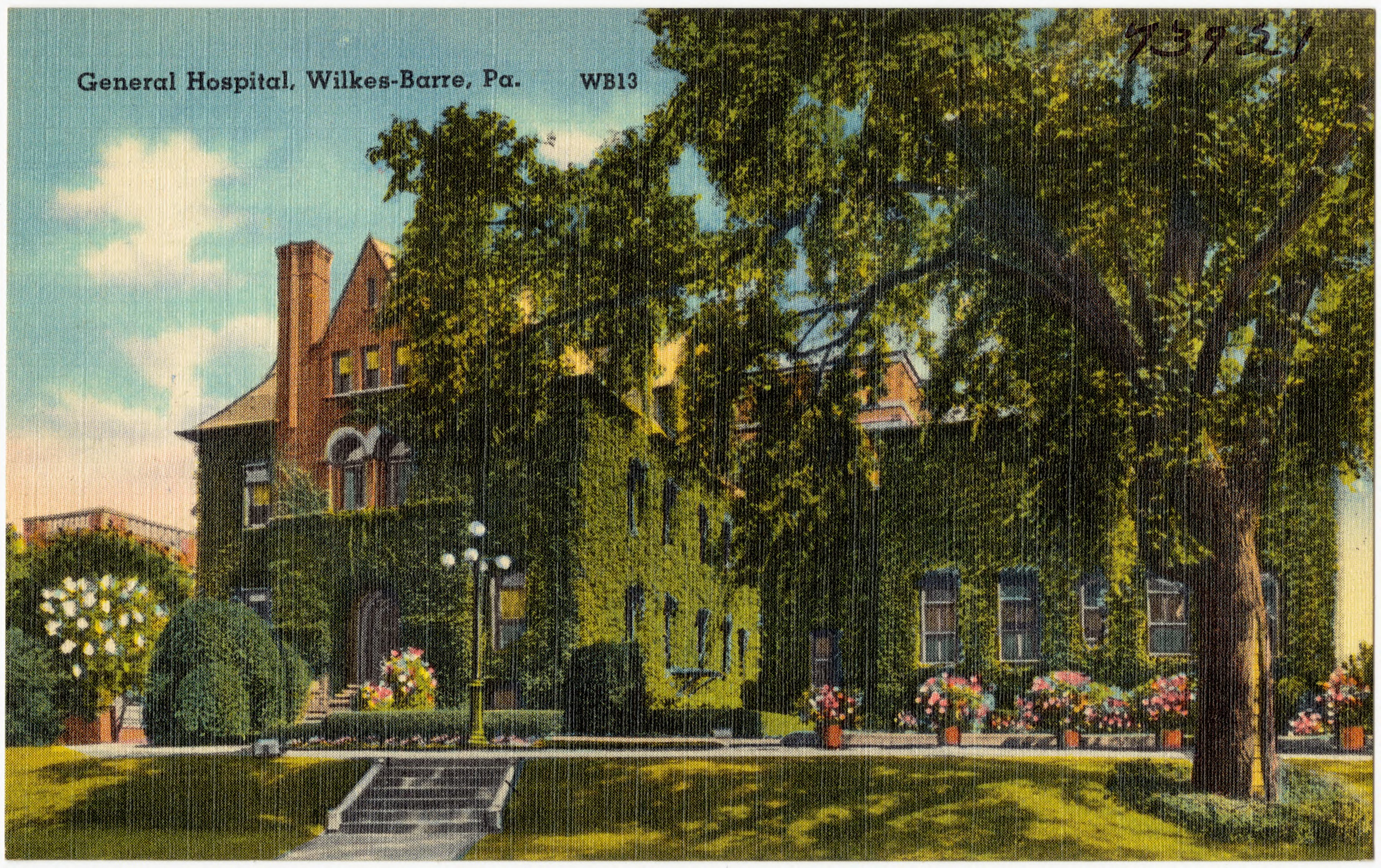
- Wilkes-Barre General Hospital

Geography
- Location: 575 N River St, Wilkes-Barre, Pennsylvania, United States
- Coordinates: 41.25857°N 75.86719°W

Organization
- Care system: For-profit

Services
- Beds: 369

Helipads
- Helipad: 2

History
- Founded: 1872

Links
- Website: Wilkes-Barre General Hospital
- Lists: Hospitals in Pennsylvania

Wilkes-Barre General Hospital is Northeastern Pennsylvania's largest community hospital with 369 beds and a medical staff of more than 400 physicians representing nearly 50 medical and surgical specialties. It is a member of the Commonwealth Health Network. Wilkes-Barre specializes in cardiovascular care, but also manages patients with oncological, and renal disease among others.

Tenor Health purchased Wilkes-Barre General Hospital in February 2026.

== History ==
The hospital opened on October 10, 1872, as Wilkes-Barre City Hospital. In its first years it was maintained entirely by voluntary subscriptions, until state appropriations began in 1874. In 1875, a four-acre tract on River Street near Mill Creek was donated by John Welles Hollenback for a permanent facility. A new hospital building providing space for approximately 75 to 100 patients was constructed on the site and opened on April 1, 1876. The institution expanded steadily over the following decades; by 1926 it had grown to a capacity of 325 beds.

The name changed to Wilkes-Barre General Hospital in 1925.

During the late nineteenth and early twentieth centuries, Hollenback remained closely associated with the institution, serving as one of its original incorporators in 1873 and continuing as a director for fifty years. He held leadership roles on the hospital’s board, serving as vice-president from 1892 to 1903 and as president from 1903 to 1908.

Board membership during this period also included several prominent figures in Wilkes-Barre civic life including Robert Charles Miner, Gilbert Stuart McClintock, and Charles Parrish Hunt who served as directors at various times.

The hospital was sold to Community Health Systems on May 1, 2009.

In October 2025, Community Health Systems (CHS), the for-profit parent company of Wilkes-Barre General Hospital, signed an agreement to sell the hospital along with Regional Hospital of Scranton and Moses Taylor Hospital to the nonprofit Tenor Health Foundation. The deal close in February 2026. Under the terms discussed, Tenor Health sought tax-exempt borrowing to finance the acquisition and agreed to make payments in lieu of taxes (PILOT) to Luzerne County, reflecting the change to nonprofit status and the resulting shift in tax treatment.

== Services ==
The hospital records approximately 34,386 emergency department visits annually, 9,036 inpatient admissions, more than 355,000 outpatient visits, and performs both inpatient and outpatient surgical procedures.

The hospital operates a 24-hour emergency department providing care for a full range of urgent and emergent conditions. Clinical services include cardiovascular care, orthopedic surgery, neurosurgery, general surgery, and advanced diagnostic imaging such as MRI, CT, nuclear medicine, and PET/CT.

== Awards & Recognitions ==
In 2019, The Center for Advanced Rehabilitation at Wilkes-Barre General Hospital was ranked in the top 10 percent of inpatient rehabilitation facilities nationally according to a Uniform Data System for Medical Rehabilitation (UDSMR) performance report.

In 2025, Wilkes-Barre General Hospital was recognized by the Hospital and Healthsystem Association of Pennsylvania’s Excellence in Patient Safety Recognition program for demonstrating low rates of healthcare-associated infections, as measured by standardized infection ratios for central line-associated bloodstream infections, catheter-associated urinary tract infections, and Clostridioides difficile infections compared with statewide averages.
