= Lower Bucks Hospital =

Hospital in Bristol, Pennsylvania, U.S.

- Prime Healthcare Services

Geography
- Location: 501 Bath Rd, Bristol, Pennsylvania, United States
- Coordinates: 40.105825°N 74.867550°W

Organization
- Type: Community
- Affiliated university: Philadelphia College of Osteopathic Medicine

Services
- Emergency department: Level IV trauma center

History
- Founded: 1954

Links
- Website: www.lowerbuckshosp.com
- Lists: Hospitals in the United States

Lower Bucks Hospital is a hospital located in Bristol, Pennsylvania, United States. The hospital focuses on behavioral health, cardiology, emergency medicine, orthopedics, radiology and general surgery. Lower Bucks has a Level IV Trauma Center and is affiliated with the Philadelphia College of Osteopathic Medicine.

== History ==
Lower Bucks Hospital was founded in 1954 as a community hospital. The hospital was funded by a local grassroots movement. In 2012, Prime Healthcare Services, an American private healthcare company, purchased the hospital and currently manages it.

In 2010, Lower Bucks was on the brink of closure after suffering "operating losses of nearly $20 million over the previous five years". Senator Tommy Tomlinson saved the hospital with a Bill which legalized table games at casinos in Bucks County. The tax revenue generated allowed the hospital to avoid closure. In November 2019, Tomlinson received the Dee Brown Lifetime Achievement Award for his assistance.

In 2016, Lower Bucks brought in a new team of emergency room doctors led by Dr. David Jaslow in an attempt to designate the emergency department as a Level IV Trauma Center. Jaslow served "eight years as deputy chief for clinical affairs and EMS medical director for the Bucks County Rescue Squad". His goal was "to rebuild [the] emergency department and to fix some systems". Linda Grass, CEO of Lower Bucks Hospital at the time said "this is our number-one initiative, our first step toward a clinical transformation of the hospital. We want to change community perception and have a higher-caliber of medical staff in the emergency department". The emergency department was previously staffed by "an outside firm that provided ER doctors on a contract basis".

Statistics gathered in the emergency departments of Lower Bucks Hospital, Doylestown Hospital, St. Mary Medical Center and Jefferson Bucks Hospital were used and published by the National Sexual Violence Resource Center (NSVRC) to study the prevalence of violence in local communities. According to the study "one in five women and one in 71 men will experience rape at some point in their lives".

On June 28, 2019, Michael Motte became the new CEO of Lower Bucks Hospital. Motte hopes to bring new services to the hospital including a "limb preservation program with a mobile unit" and a new program "designed to help people withdraw from opioids or alcohol".
