= Indiana Regional Medical Center =

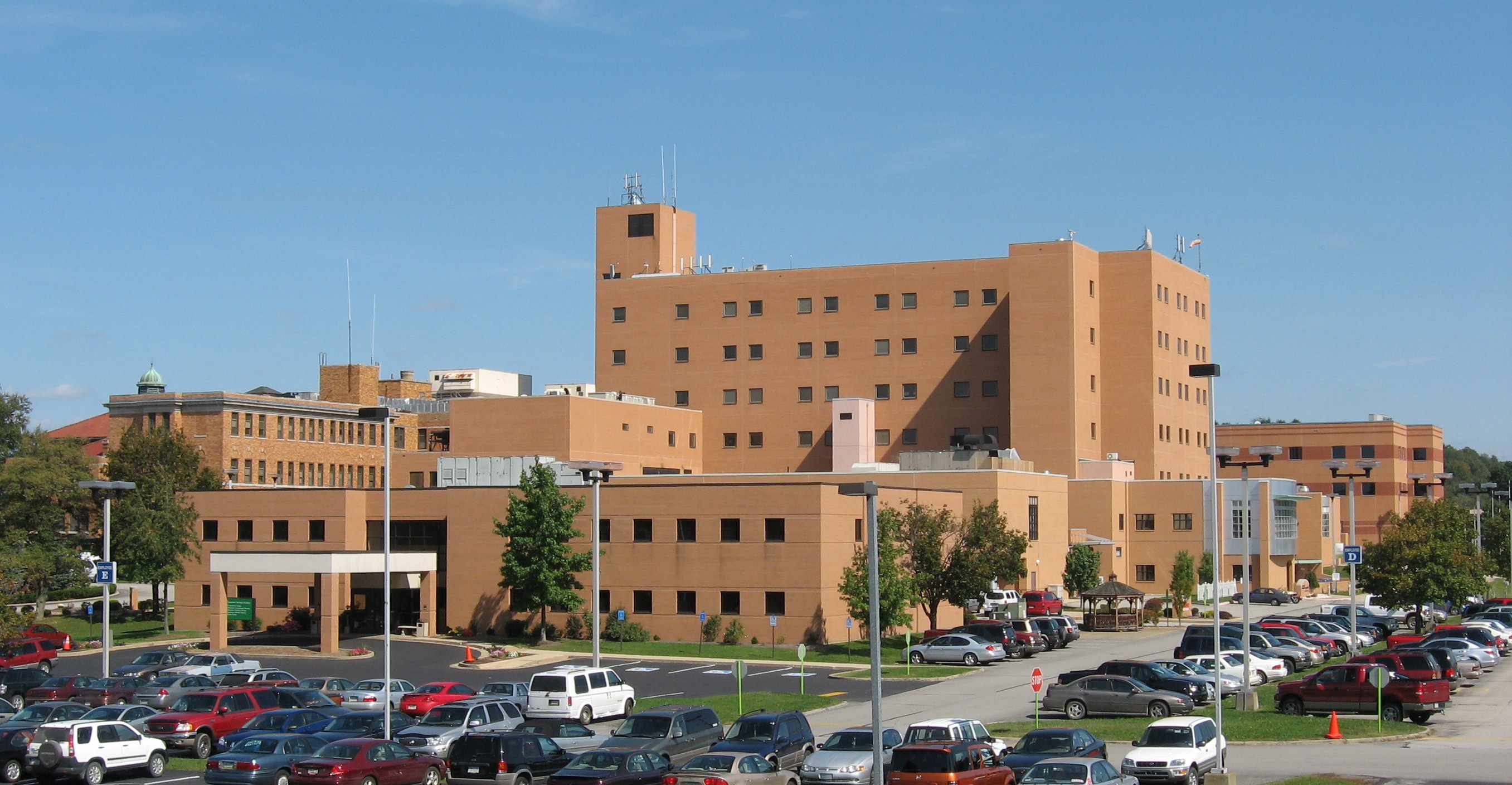
- Indiana Regional Medical Center in 2008

Geography
- Location: Indiana, Pennsylvania, United States
- Coordinates: 40.6074°N 79.1563°W

Services
- Emergency department: Level IV trauma

History
- Opened: 1914

Links
- Website: www.indianarmc.org
- Lists: Hospitals in Pennsylvania

Indiana Regional Medical Center is a not-for-profit hospital located in Indiana, Pennsylvania that was founded in 1914. The first hospital in Indiana, PA was founded by Dr. Harry B. Neal and Dr. George Simpson on 9th and Church street in 1904. In 1914 the Neal-Simpson Hospital merged with a then newly forming hospital to found Indiana Hospital, which became Indiana Regional Medical Center. It is one of the eighteen member hospitals of the Pennsylvania Mountains Healthcare Alliance that was established to provide community-based health care via independent community hospitals. The hospital became a level IV trauma center in 2026.

Indiana Regional Medical Center employs more than 50 physicians in and surrounding Indiana, PA. This group of primary care and specialty providers is called IRMC Physician Group.
