= Guthrie Robert Packer Hospital, Towanda Campus =

- Guthrie

Geography
- Location: 91 Hospital Drive, Towanda, Pennsylvania, United States
- Coordinates: 41°47′02.9″N 76°26′54.7″W

Organization
- Care system: Private
- Type: Community

Services
- Beds: 35

Helipads
- Helipad: (FAA LID: 5PN2)
Number	Length		Surface
Number	ft	m	Surface
H1	50	15	Concrete

History
- Founded: 1925

Links
- Website: www.guthrie.org/location/guthrie-towanda-memorial-hospital
- Lists: Hospitals in Pennsylvania

The Guthrie Robert Packer Hospital, Towanda Campus (formerly known as Towanda Memorial Hospital) is a 35-bed community hospital in Towanda, Pennsylvania.

== History ==
Memorial Hospital started out on April 5, 1925, when Mrs. Hila C. Mills, a nurse, opened the two bed Mills Maternity and Convalescent Home on South Street. The first year she had 56 maternity and other medical cases. By 1934 her residence was no longer large enough and she put on an addition, with the home becoming a licensed 21 bed hospital the following year. In 1936, she purchased the house next door as an addition to the hospital. It soon became known as Mills Community Hospital.

In 1959, Memorial Hospital, Inc. was formed and it opened a new 42 bed acute care hospital in its present location. Ten years later, the hospital added an obstetrical suite, x-ray department, patient room wing, and an emergency room. In 1974, a four-bed intensive care unit was added, along with a skilled nursing facility.

On Sept. 20, 2013, the maternity ward closed due to a decline in the numbers of births at the hospital leading to financial struggles. In 2015, Memorial Hospital joined Guthrie leading to the change in name to Guthrie Towanda Memorial Hospital.

The hospital received the Women's Choice Award for Emergency Care in 2017 and 2018.

The hospital official became a satellite campus of Guthrie Robert Packer Hospital on Jan. 1, 2021, leading to its current name.
