= Meadville Medical Center =

Non-profit community health system located in Meadville, Pennsylvania

- Company type: Private (not-for-profit)
- Industry: Health care
- Founded: 1870; 155 years ago (as Spencer Hospital); 1984; 41 years ago (as Meadville Medical Center)
- Headquarters: Meadville, Pennsylvania, United States
- Number of locations: 2 hospitals, 2 urgent care centers, multiple physician clinics, multiple dental clinics, oncology center (2021)
- Area served: Northwestern Pennsylvania, Northeast Ohio, Western New York
- Key people: Philip E. Pandolph (President & CEO)
- Services: Acute care Community medical facilities
- Number of employees: 1,450 (2015)
- Website: mmchs.org

Meadville Medical Center Health System, commonly referred to locally as simply "MMC", is a non-profit community health system located in Meadville, Pennsylvania. The health system serves the more than 75,000 residents of Crawford County, Pennsylvania, along with 150,000 additional residents in the greater northwestern Pennsylvania region. The hospital records over nearly 380,000 total patient visits per year, including 7,000 inpatient admissions per year, while logging over 37,000 emergency department visits and over 600 births annually. The health system is currently the largest employer in Crawford County with 1,450 employees at its Meadville campuses and another 250 at Titusville Area Hospital, with its overall economic impact on the community estimated to be $300 million annually.

== History ==
=== Origins ===
Meadville Medical Center traces its roots back to the late 1800s, when then St. Joseph's Hospital and City Hospital each respectively opened their doors.

St. Joseph's Hospital, which later became known as Spencer Hospital in 1888 to honor her, was founded in 1870 by Mother Mary Agnes Spencer and the Sisters of St. Joseph on Grove Street in Meadville, as part of their mission to serve not only the local orphaned children, but the sick and injured of all ages as Meadville lacked the presence of a hospital at that time. A formal nurse training program was established at the hospital in 1902.

City Hospital, founded in 1881, came to a reality after over a year of searching for a suitable location when a group of concerned citizens first came together in search of a solution to solve the growing city's health disparities in 1880. Such a facility was formed on Randolph Street, with numerous improvements being made, but it quickly became inadequate in meeting the needs of its patients and staff. In 1886, three acres at the corner of Liberty Street and Randolph Street were purchased by local philanthropist Alfred Huidekoper, who then donated such land to the city for the purpose of building a new hospital, a large brick and mason structure that was subsequently completed in 1887. A formal nurse training program was established at City Hospital in 1903.

=== Modern Day ===
Spencer Hospital and City Hospital would continue to operate independently across town from one another for the next one hundred years until financial strain would bring the two together in 1984 to form what is now known as Meadville Medical Center. As a result of this merger, City Hospital would become known as Meadville Medical Center's Liberty Street facility, while Spencer Hospital would become the Grove Street facility. Today, these two campuses make up a 235-bed acute care hospital offering an emergency department, intensive care unit, general medical/surgical inpatient units, inpatient and outpatient/same day surgery services, a new life unit, inpatient rehabilitation and transitional care units, diagnostic imaging services, inpatient and outpatient therapy services, inpatient and outpatient mental/behavioral health services, inpatient and outpatient drug and alcohol treatment services, an outpatient lab, and a wound clinic, along with numerous physician clinics offering specialities in family medicine, internal medicine, cardiology, pulmonology, neurology, gastroenterology, nephrology, obstetrics/gynaecology, urology, otorhinolaryngology, dermatology, infectious disease, and pain management.

Since 1984, Meadville Medical Center has continued to grow its footprint in the community and add health care services for local citizens. In 1992, the Meadville Medical Center Foundation was founded to assist with this growth and further its mission based on the identified needs of the region. With the help of foundation, the health system opened the Yolanda G. Barco Oncology Institute in 2008 to serve cancer patients who had previously had to travel out of town for such services. In 2014, ground was broke on Vernon Place, a $30 million, 87,000 square foot facility that opened in 2016 and now houses the health system's occupational/employee health clinic, outpatient therapy and sports medicine services, outpatient lab and imaging services, a cafe, Orthopedic Associates of Meadville, the Vernon Women's Center, and the Vernon Township branch of the Meadville Family YMCA.

In October 2015, Meadville Medical Center officially purchased Titusville Area Hospital, a then independent hospital in nearby Titusville, Pennsylvania founded in 1900, bringing together the county's two acute care hospitals under one health system. Titusville Area Hospital is now a 25-bed critical access hospital offering inpatient medical, surgical, pediatric and critical care services, along with same day surgery, an outpatient imaging center and lab, cardiac rehabilitation, oncology, and pain management services.

The health system also currently has numerous community and rural health clinics throughout Crawford County, along with two urgent care locations in Meadville and Titusville, and two community dental clinics in Meadville and nearby Conneautville.

== Facilities ==
=== Hospitals ===
- Meadville Medical Center, Liberty Street campus
- Meadville Medical Center, Grove Street campus
- Titusville Area Hospital

=== Urgent Cares ===
- Vernon ExpressCare
- Titusville ExpressCare

=== Community/Rural Health Clinics ===
- Cambridge Springs Health Center
- Conneaut Lake Health Center
- Conneaut Valley Health Center
- Meadville Community Health Center
- Tionesta Health Center

=== Community Dental Clinics ===
- Meadville Dental Center
- Valley Dental Center

=== Other Outpatient Facilities ===
- Yolanda G. Barco Oncology Institute
- Mind-Body Wellness Center
- One Vernon Place
- Poplar Street Medical Arts
- Meadville Dermatology and Skin Surgery Institute
- Meadville Pain Management
- Oil Valley Internal Medicine Associates
- Saegertown Medical Associates

== See also ==
- Meadville Medical Center Foundation
