= Trinity Health Mid-Atlantic =

Organization in Pennsylvania and Delaware, US

- Trinity Health Mid-Atlantic

Geography
- Location: Southeastern Pennsylvania, Bucks County, Chester County, Delaware County, Montgomery County, Philadelphia County, New Castle County., Pennsylvania, Delaware, United States

Links
- Website: www.trinityhealthma.org
- Lists: Hospitals in the United States

Trinity Health Mid-Atlantic is a healthcare system in Philadelphia. It was formed in October 2018 by the joining together of Mercy Catholic Medical Center - Mercy Fitzgerald Campus in Darby, Pennsylvania; Mercy Catholic Medical Center Mercy Philadelphia Campus; Nazareth Hospital in Philadelphia, Pennsylvania; Saint Francis Healthcare in Wilmington, Delaware; St. Mary Medical Center in Langhorne, Pennsylvania; and their associated programs and services.

In October 2018, St. Mary Medical Center, Saint Francis Healthcare, and the three hospitals of Mercy Health System of Southeastern Pennsylvania joined as one regional health system.

== History ==
In 1918, Misericordia Hospital, now Mercy Philadelphia, was founded by the Sisters of Mercy. The Sisters of Mercy were founded in 1831 in Dublin, Ireland, by Catherine McAuley, an heiress who used her inheritance to serve the poor; women and children in particular. McAuley founded 12 Mercy convents in Ireland and two in England. Twenty years after McAuley died in 1841, the Sisters of Mercy relocated to Philadelphia where they developed schools and visited the sick.

St. Mary Medical Center was founded by the Sisters of St. Francis who opened the Philadelphia-based, St. Mary Hospital in 1860. In 1973, the hospital relocated to Bucks County because of a regional need for health services. In 1996, the hospital's name was changed to St. Mary Medical Center.

Saint Francis Healthcare was founded by the Sisters of Saint Francis of Philadelphia in 1924.

In 2024, Trinity Health Mid-Atlantic includes four acute care facilities. It has also offered three Programs for Acute Care of the Elderly (PACE), three home health agencies, a physician network and an accountable care organization.

- Mercy Catholic Medical Center – Mercy. Fitzgerald Campus, Darby, Pennsylvania.
- Mercy Catholic Medical Center – Mercy. Philadelphia Campus, Philadelphia, Pennsylvania.
- Nazareth Hospital, Philadelphia, Pennsylvania.
- Saint Francis Healthcare, Wilmington, DE.
- St. Mary Medical Center, Langhorne, Pennsylvania.
- Mercy LIFE, Saint Francis LIFE and LIFE St. Mary.
- Mercy Home Health, Saint Francis at Home and St. Mary Home Care.
- Gateway Health Plan.

Trinity Health Mid-Atlantic is the largest Catholic healthcare system serving the Greater Philadelphia area and is a member of Trinity Health, a multi-institutional, Catholic health system, sponsored by Catholic Health Ministries.

== Saint Francis Hospital – Wilmington, Delaware ==
Saint Francis Hospital, part of Trinity Health Mid-Atlantic, is a 146-bed short term acute care hospital located in Wilmington, Delaware. Saint Francis Hospital serves the Wilmington community and Northern New Castle County by offering emergency care, cardiology, cancer care, family medicine and women’s health among other services. Founded by the Sisters of Saint Francis of Philadelphia in 1924, Saint Francis heeds a particular call to serve those in need. Saint Francis Hospital is dedicated to serve all who require expert medical care regardless of religion, race, color, creed or economic status.

=== History ===
Father William Scott, pastor of St. Joseph’s on the Brandywine, was inspired with the idea to build a Catholic hospital in Wilmington. Catholics in Wilmington contributed to the cost of the land, purchased from the McComb estate, and the Sisters of the Third Order of St. Francis of Glen Riddle contributed to the building and equipment.

After many years, Saint Francis Hospital opened its doors on October 16, 1924, dedicated to St. Francis of Assisi which could be seen from almost anywhere from the city.

== Mercy Catholic Medical Center – Mercy Fitzgerald Campus ==
Mercy Fitzgerald, part of Trinity Health Mid-Atlantic, is a 204-bed teaching hospital located in Darby, Pennsylvania, which offers advanced acute care services in Delaware County and Southwest Philadelphia. In 2015, the hospital admitted 8,834 patients, cared for 41,855 people in the Emergency Department and saw 166,028 outpatient registrations.

Mercy Fitzgerald is home to comprehensive heart and vascular care, cancer care, bariatrics, orthopedics and ambulatory services, advanced diagnostic and interventional radiology, diabetes education, a sleep centre, orthopedics, wound care, acute inpatient rehabilitation, and physical and occupational therapy. In 2012, a retail pharmacy was opened on Mercy Fitzgerald's campus and the hospital established a Mercy Cancer Center featuring a new Infusion Center. In 2013, a new Endoscopy Center opened with advanced capabilities to diagnose and treat digestive disorders.

The hospital also works collaboratively with first responders and local organizations to be a healing presence in its communities, especially in times of emergencies and disasters. In 2012, it was named the recipient of the Corporate Humanitarian Award from the American Red Cross Southeastern Pennsylvania Chapter.

=== History ===
In 1922, local banker and businessman Thomas M. Fitzgerald willed his property and funds to establish a hospital on Lansdowne Avenue in Darby, Pennsylvania. Seven years later, May Fitzgerald used $1.25 million from her late husband's trust and worked with the Archdiocese of Philadelphia to plan Delaware County's first Catholic hospital. Ground broke in 1932 and a year later, 30,000 people witnessed the dedication of the hospital, known at that time as Fitzgerald Mercy Hospital. To manage hospital operations, the Archdiocese asked the Sisters of Mercy as they already had experience with the Misericordia Hospital (now Mercy Philadelphia Hospital) which was established 15 years earlier in West Philadelphia. The Sisters agreed to rent Mercy Fitzgerald Hospital from the Archdiocese for $1 a year.

Mercy Fitzgerald was the first to introduce a hospital-administered Home Care Program in 1969, the first to open an inpatient psychiatric facility in 1977, and one of the first to provide paramedic services in the early 1980s. In more recent years, the hospital was the first in the County to install a 64-Slice CT scanner and the first in the region to launch photo ID bracelets for patients as part of efforts to improve patient safety.

== Mercy Catholic Medical Center – Mercy Philadelphia Campus ==
Mercy Philadelphia (formerly Misericordia Hospital), is a 157-bed community teaching hospital, founded by the Sisters of Mercy in 1909, which serves the communities of West Philadelphia and Southwest Philadelphia.

Services include emergency, surgical, cardiac, critical care, oncology, wound care, gastroenterology, mental wellness, physical and occupational rehabilitation, vascular, interventional and diagnostic radiology—including the latest in radiation oncology and diagnostic imaging technology. Its Mercy Cancer Care program is accredited by The American College of Surgeons Commission on Cancer and is affiliated with the Jefferson Cancer Network. In addition, a partnership with Penn Cardiac Care brought cardiovascular care to the West Philadelphia community.

=== History ===
In the summer of 1913, Mother M. Hildegarde, a Sister of Mercy, was asked by Archbishop Prendergast if the Sisters would manage a hospital in West Philadelphia; they accepted. Negotiations were begun for acquiring the lot at 54th Street and Cedar Avenue in West Philadelphia, at a cost of US$108,000.

Two sisters were sent to Mercy Hospital in Pittsburgh, Pennsylvania, and two others to Mercy Hospital in Baltimore, Maryland, to train to become nurses. Other sisters were registered at the College of Pharmacy and the Polyclinic Hospital in Philadelphia, for courses in pathology.

Mercy Philadelphia opened on July 2, 1918, as Misericordia Hospital. Two days later, the first patient was admitted to the hospital.

In February of 2020 Trinity Health notified State and Local officials of their intentions to wind down operations at Mercy Hospital. By September of that same year a consortium led by Penn Medicine and Public Health Management Corp, came to an agreement with Trinity Health to take over Mercy and related facilities and infrastructure, with the exception of the Mercy Senior Center which was retained by Trinity Health. The facility has since been integrated into the Penn Medicine system and serves as a remote location for the Hospital of the University of Pennsylvania known as the Hospital of the University of Pennsylvania - Cedar Avenue.

== Nazareth Hospital ==
Nazareth Hospital, established in 1940 by the Sisters of the Holy Family of Nazareth, serves Northeast Philadelphia with 205 acute beds and 28 skilled nursing beds.

In 2012, Nazareth expanded the community's access to emergency hip fracture repair and cardiovascular care with its therapeutic hypothermia program. An affiliate of Penn Cardiac Care, Nazareth continued to provide emergency angioplasty for patients suffering heart attacks, as well as heart diagnostics, a cath lab, a Vein Center and the Center of Wound Healing and Hyperbaric Medicine. Nazareth launched a Balance Program to prevent falls and improve quality of life for people with conditions that place them at risk.

=== History ===
To meet the healthcare needs of Northeast Philadelphia, the Sisters of the Holy Family of Nazareth prepared to open a hospital, by sending members of the Congregation to train at hospitals throughout the country, and by raising money to build. After six years of preparation, the Sisters founded Nazareth Hospital in 1940. On March 9, Nazareth Hospital opened with 116 beds and at a cost of $800,000 - financed solely by the Sisters, their families and friends.

Recognizing the necessity of partnering to strengthen the base on which the hospital was founded and of maintaining the Catholic identity of Nazareth Hospital, the Sisters transferred ownership of Nazareth Hospital to the Franciscan Health System on March 1, 1995. In 1996, through the Franciscan Health System, Nazareth Hospital became a member of Catholic Health Initiatives.

In 2001, Catholic Health Initiatives transferred ownership of several facilities, Nazareth Hospital among them, to Catholic Health East (CHE). Through this transfer, Nazareth became a member of Mercy Health System, a member of CHE. In 2013 CHE joined together with Trinity Health of Livonia, Mich., to form one Catholic health system.

== Mercy LIFE (Living Independence for the Elderly) ==
Mercy LIFE is a nationally recognized Program of All-inclusive Care for the Elderly (PACE). Mercy LIFE has provided a community-based long-term care program for seniors who reside in South Philadelphia since 2001 and began serving North Philadelphia in early 2009. The program serves seniors with a range of health conditions such as chronic illness, memory loss, difficulty providing personal care such as bathing and dressing, and more.

Mercy LIFE also operates Adult Day Centers, which offer preventive healthcare as well as observe and respond to changes in each senior's health.

Mercy LIFE's services include primary care and physician specialist services, nursing care, prescribed medications, dental care, mental health services, physical, occupational and speech therapies, along with vision, hearing and foot care.

=== History ===
In 1998, the first Mercy LIFE centre opened on Columbus Boulevard with seven participants, a few staff members, and one vehicle to provide transportation. A second centre was opened in 2005. The program motivated seniors to remain active and improve their quality of life, and additional Centers were opened in North Philadelphia and Delaware County.

== Mercy Home Health ==
Mercy Home Health operates in Bucks County, Chester County, Delaware County, Montgomery County and Philadelphia County and serves over 27,000 people in the Philadelphia five-county area.

Mercy Home Health provides services to support the ongoing treatment of heart, cancer, orthopedic conditions and much more.

Healthcare services include: Palliative Care, Rehabilitation Therapy, In-Home Telemonitoring, Skilled Home Nursing, Post-Partum Care and Support Services.
