= Latrobe Hospital =

- Excela Health

Geography
- Location: One Mellon Way, Latrobe, Pennsylvania 15650, Northeast United States, Pennsylvania, United States
- Coordinates: 40.3210°N 79.3936°W

Services
- Beds: 188

History
- Founded: 1907

Links
- Website: www.independence.health/locations/latrobe-hospital/
- Lists: Hospitals in Pennsylvania

Latrobe Hospital is located in the eastern section of Westmoreland County and on the north side of Latrobe, Pennsylvania. Latrobe has 188 inpatient beds and a ten-bed behavioral health unit. A variety of outpatient services, including a sleep disorders center, are at this hospital. The hospital has a number of buildings on site, including its Occupational Medicine building, at 121 W. 2nd Street. Latrobe is owned by Independence Health but will be taken over by WVU this fall

Latrobe was founded in 1907 and is today considered to be a teaching hospital. In 1974 a family medicine residency program was started there. It is affiliated with the Jefferson Medical College of Thomas Jefferson University.

== Latrobe Hospital rating data ==
The HealthGrades website contains the latest quality data for Excela Health Latrobe Hospital, as of 2015. For this rating section three different types of data from HealthGrades are presented: quality ratings for twenty-four inpatient conditions and procedures, eleven patient safety indicators, percentage of patients giving the hospital a 9 or 10 (the two highest possible ratings)

For patient safety indicators, there are the same three possible ratings. For this hospital safety indicators were rated as:

- Worse than expected - 1
- As expected -11
- Better than expected - 2

Data for patients giving this hospital a 9 or 10 are:

- Patients rating this hospital as a 9 or 10 - 69%
- Patients rating hospitals as a 9 or 10 nationally - 69%
