= Mount Nittany Medical Center =

- Mount Nittany Health

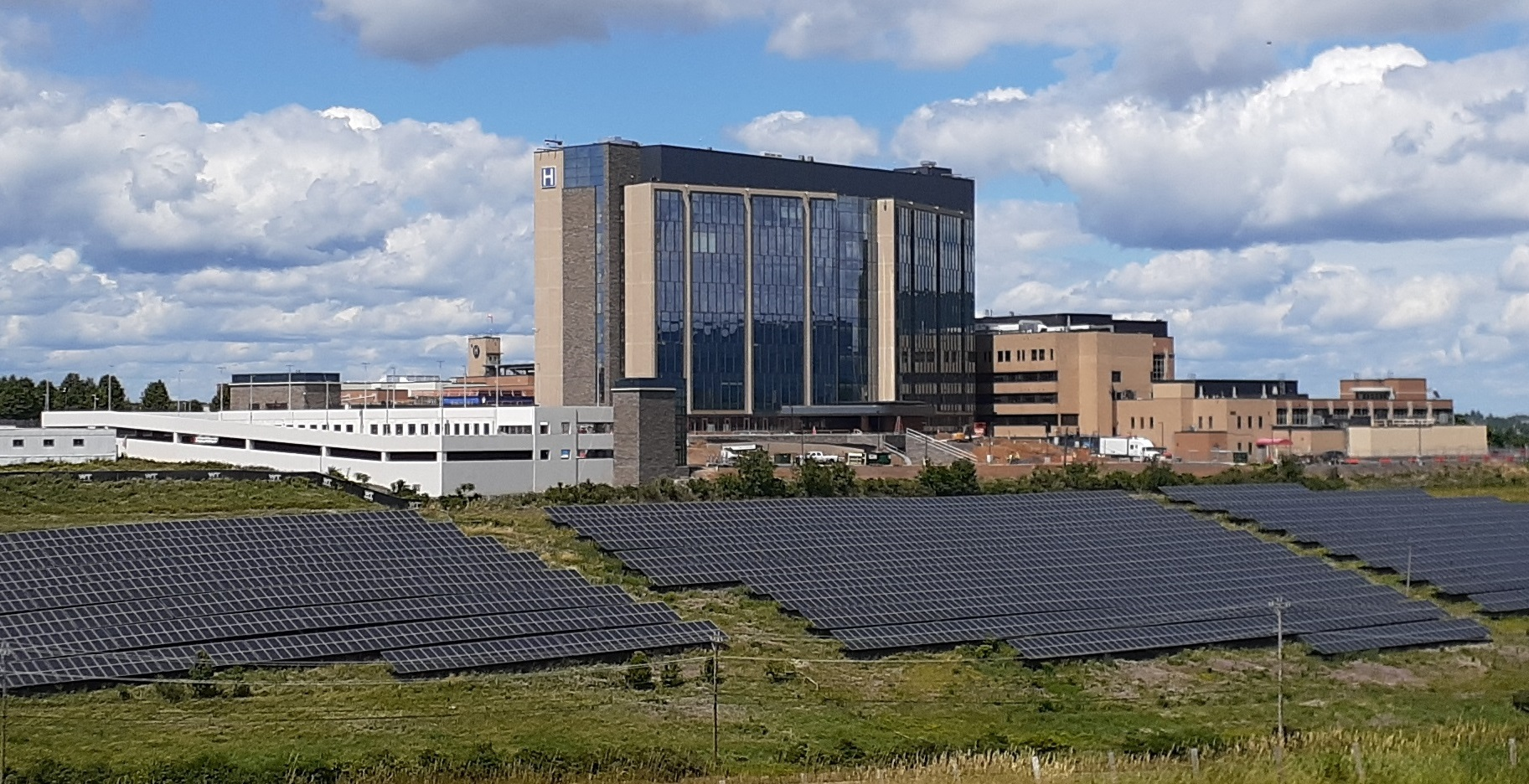
- MNMC in 2026

- Location within Pennsylvania

Geography
- Location: State College, Pennsylvania, United States
- Coordinates: 40.81900°N 77.84251°W

Services
- Emergency department: Level IV trauma
- Beds: 260 (Note: 243–248 beds, license for 260 beds)

Helipads
- Helipad: FAA LID: PS57
Number	Length		Surface
Number	ft	m	Surface
H1	46	14	Rooftop/concrete

History
- Founded: 1902 (as Bellefonte Hospital); 1972 (Mountainview Unit)

Links
- Website: http://www.mountnittany.org
- Lists: Hospitals in Pennsylvania

Mount Nittany Medical Center (MNMC), formerly Centre Community Hospital, is a hospital in College Township, Pennsylvania near State College. It is an acute-care facility offering emergency, medical, surgical, diagnostic and community services. The hospital is located adjacent to the Pennsylvania State University main campus near Beaver Stadium. MNMC employs around 2,400 healthcare professionals and support staff, with 60 specialties and subspecialties.

Mount Nittany Health is the operating organization and has ranked as Centre County's second-largest employer.

== History ==
=== 1900s ===
The Bellefonte Hospital was founded on July 8, 1902 in Bellefonte, Pennsylvania. It began in a frame house with six patient beds. In 1924, it was renamed Centre County Hospital; in 1971, it was renamed Centre Community Hospital. In 1972, the Mountainview Unit opened at the current location in State College, and the Bellefonte location was known as the Willowbank Unit. The Willowbank unit closed in 1978.

=== 2000s ===
In 2003, the name was changed to Mount Nittany Medical Center. The facility has undergone several renovations and expansions. Some of the notable expansions include the addition of a 52,000 square foot east wing in 2010 and a cancer center in 2012. A 26,000 square foot cardiovascular pavilion opened in 2019 which includes cardiac catheterization lab and electrophysiology lab spaces, complete with imaging and monitoring technology. In 2023, construction began on a 10-story patient tower.

== Emergency capabilities and collaborations ==
Mount Nittany Medical Center was the only hospital with an emergency department in Centre County until Penn Highlands State College opened in 2024; the opening of Penn Highlands caused MNMC to lose its federal designation and funding as a "sole community hospital," a decision which was objected to by both MNMC and local government representatives. MNMC became a level IV trauma center in 2026; patients have also been transferred to hospitals including Geisinger Medical Center, UPMC Altoona, and Milton S. Hershey Medical Center.

Mount Nittany Medical Center includes a rooftop helipad used by Life Flight. MNMC also collaborates with physicians affiliated with Geisinger. Mount Nittany provides emergency medical services (EMS); other ambulance services in Centre County include Centre Lifelink EMS, Penn State, Snow Shoe EMS, Pleasant Gap Fire Company, and Port Matilda EMS.

Mount Nittany is a founding member of the Penn State Hershey Cancer Institute (PSHCI).

== Mount Nittany Health ==
Mount Nittany Health was established as a system organization in 2011. The organization operates several locations with its Mount Nittany Physician Group, including a four-story outpatient center that opened in 2024. Mount Nittany's president and CEO since 2017 has been Kathleen Rhine. In fiscal year 2020, she earned $1.1 million. Mount Nittany Health had total revenues of $640 million in fiscal year 2025.

== Controversies ==
In 2024, Mount Nittany Health agreed to pay $1.8 million to settle a lawsuit regarding the organization sharing private patient information from its website and patient portal with third parties.

== Gallery ==
Bellefonte Hospital

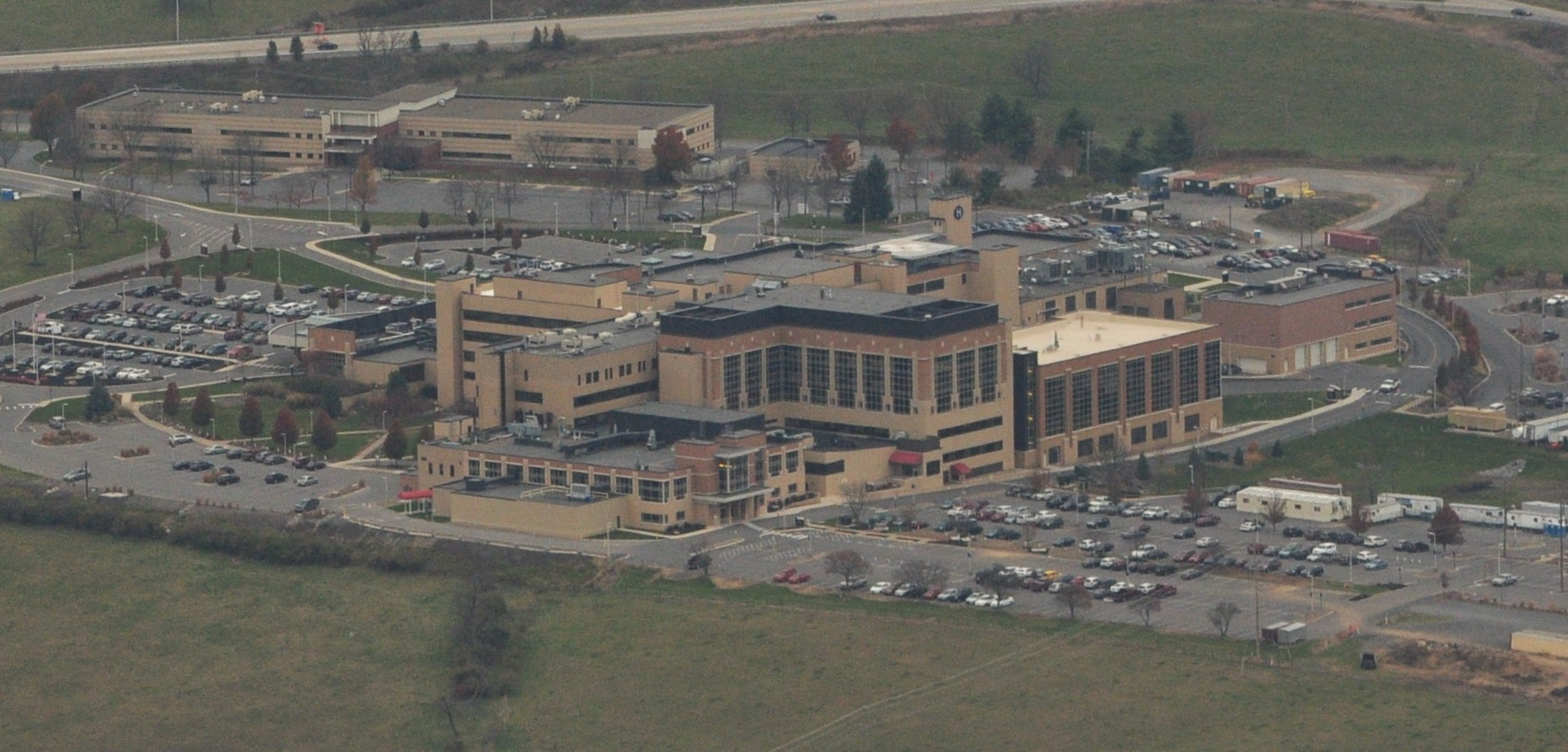
MNMC in 2024

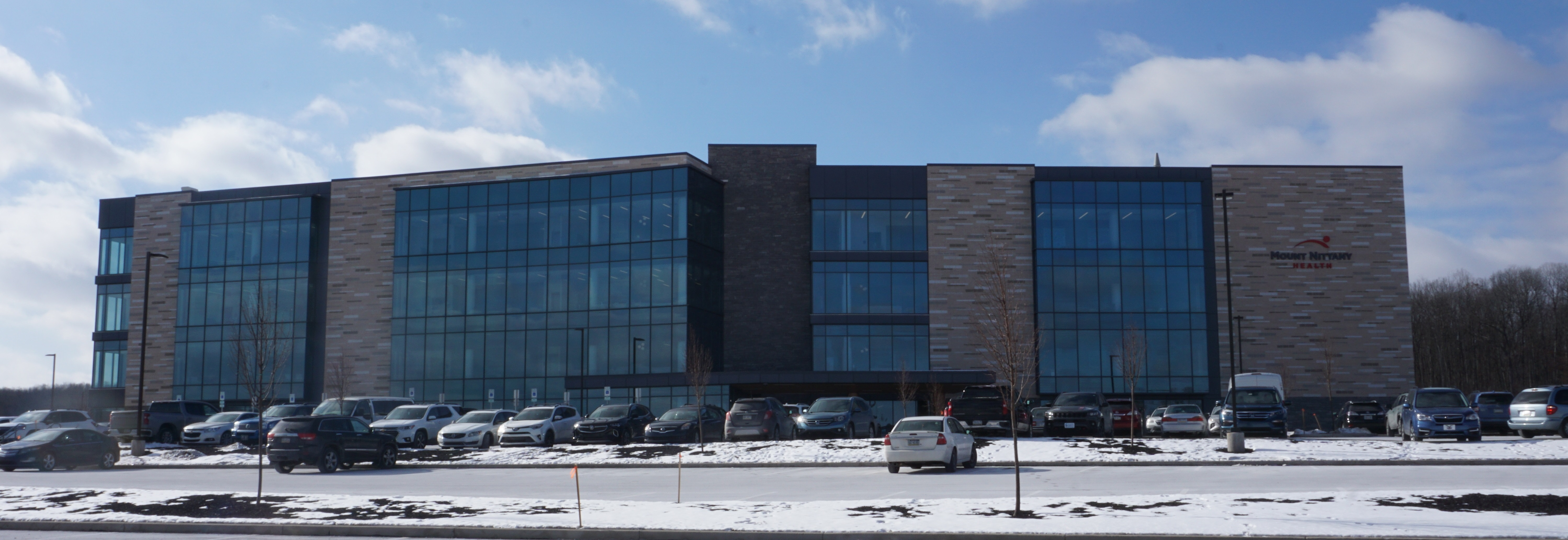
Mount Nittany Health Toftrees
