= Schuylkill Regional Medical Center =

- Lehigh Valley Health Network

Geography
- Location: Pottsville, Pennsylvania, United States
- Coordinates: 40.691035°N 76.188962°W

Organization
- Type: General

History
- Opened: August 1, 2008

Links
- Website: schuylkillhealth.com
- Lists: Hospitals in Pennsylvania

Schuylkill Regional Medical Center is a non-profit affiliation between two community hospitals formerly known as Good Samaritan Regional Medical Center and The Pottsville Hospital and Warne Clinic, both of which are located in Pottsville, Pennsylvania, United States.

On August 1, 2008, Schuylkill Health became the new parent organization for both facilities and their related health systems. After the affiliation was formalized in 2008, Good Samaritan Regional Medical Center became known as the East Norwegian Street campus and Pottsville Hospital was renamed the South Jackson Street campus.

Schuylkill Health System provides comprehensive inpatient and outpatient services and includes a regional network of off-site centers throughout Schuylkill County, Pennsylvania which specialize in family care, home health, outpatient surgery, MRI, and rehabilitation. Both the South Jackson Street and East Norwegian Street campuses are designated Level III Trauma centers by the Pennsylvania Trauma Systems Foundation.

On September 16, 2016, both campuses became part of Lehigh Valley Health Network.

== See also ==
- List of hospitals in Pennsylvania
