= Children's Home of Pittsburgh =

American non-profit organization

Children's Home of Pittsburgh Lemieux Family Center
- Formation: 1893
- Type: Non-profit
- Location: 5324 Penn Avenue, Friendship, Pittsburgh, Pennsylvania, US
- Coordinates: 40.464384°N 79.937553°W
- Services: Child and family services
- Website: www.childrenshomepgh.org
- Formerly called: Pennsylvania Children's Home Society

The Children's Home of Pittsburgh, established in 1893, is an independent non-profit organization in Pittsburgh, Pennsylvania. The organization's mission is "to promote the health and well-being of infants and children through services which establish and strengthen the family," including adoption, day care and pediatric health care.

In March 2007, the Children's Home moved to Penn Avenue in the Friendship neighborhood of Pittsburgh. It added "Lemieux Family Center" to its name in recognition of ongoing support from the Mario Lemieux Foundation.

It is organized as a 501(c)(3) Public Charity. In 2024 it reported $18,428,319 in total revenue, $17,991,770 in total expenses, and $38,416,437 in total assets.

== History ==
The Children's Home was founded by the Reverend W.H. Thompson in 1893 as the Pennsylvania Children's Home Society, to care for orphaned children and find them permanent homes. The first Children's Home was located on Penn Avenue in the Wilkinsburg neighborhood of Pittsburgh. The Pennsylvania Children's Home Society expected adoptive parents to tell their children their medical and social history; as early as 1927, society refused to allow an adoption if the prospective parents were not willing to inform the child.

In 1935, after several location changes, the Society settled in the Shadyside neighborhood and officially changed its name to the Children's Home of Pittsburgh. After moving one more time in 1969, the organization now resides on Penn Avenue in the neighborhood of Friendship.

In the 1980s and 1990s, two medical programs were introduced. The first was the Transitional Infant Care hospital, which opened in 1984 for the families of premature babies. The second was Child's Way, which opened in 1998 and offers day care services.

In the early 2000s, demand continued to grow for the Children's Home's services and the opening of the new location provided the space necessary to continue to further develop these programs. In 2008, the Children's Home received a federal grant of $307,414 to partially finance its expansion.

== Adoption ==
Originally, the Children's Home only housed children who were eligible for adoption, and it was reported in 1941 that every child was adopted within a year.

Now, the organization's licensed infant adoption program offers individual counseling and support groups for birthparents, adoptive parent counseling and education, family studies, short-term foster care, infertility-related counseling, a research and reunion program, and community adoption education.
