= Meadville Medical Center Foundation =

- Company type: Private (not-for-profit)
- Industry: Health care
- Founded: 1992
- Headquarters: Meadville, Pennsylvania
- Area served: Crawford County, Pennsylvania
- Key people: Donald Rhoten - President
- Revenue: ▼$450,000 USD (FY 2011)
- Total assets: $1,000,000
- Number of employees: 2 (2021)
- Website: mmchs.org

Meadville Medical Center Foundation, located in Meadville, Pennsylvania, serves the greater Crawford County and surrounding areas by raising funds in support of continuously improving the operations of the Meadville Medical Center Health System and its subsidiaries.

== History ==
The Meadville Medical Center Foundation was established on May 30, 1992, by Larry Yartz, then Meadville Medical Center Foundation President/CEO, and Anthony Defail, then Meadville Medical Center President/CEO. Since that time, the foundation has funded over 30 projects, allowing for the purchase of new medical equipment and the development of new buildings and healthcare services in the local community.

== Fundraising ==
To fund its objectives and projects, all money raised by the Meadville Medical Center Foundation comes strictly from the donations of those in the local community, a network currently consisting of over 4,000 donors.

== Leadership ==
The Meadville Medical Center Foundation is currently led by President Donald K. Rhoten, along with a 14-member Board of Directors made up of various leaders and other individuals from the local community.
