= Wayne Memorial Hospital (Pennsylvania) =

- Wayne Memorial Health System
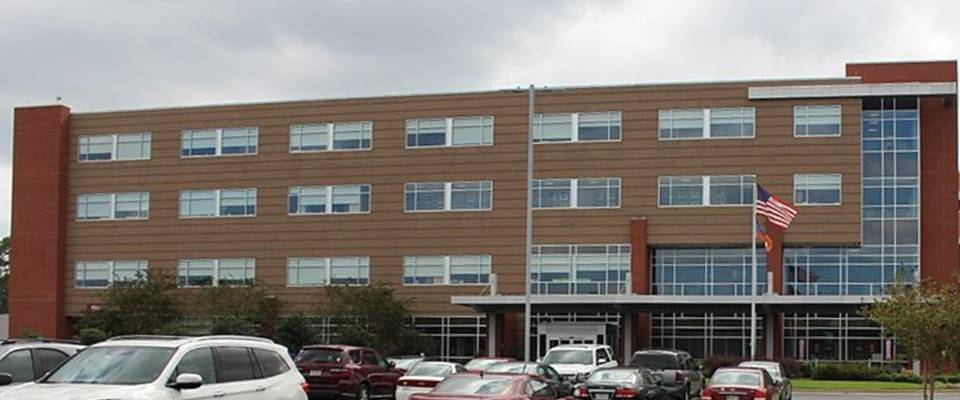

Geography
- Location: 601 Park Street, Honesdale, Pennsylvania, United States
- Coordinates: 41°34′36″N 75°15′37″W

Organization
- Type: Community
- Affiliated university: Geisinger Commonwealth School of Medicine, Luzerne County Community College, Marywood University

Services
- Emergency department: Level IV trauma center
- Beds: 114

Helipads
- Helipad: FAA LID: 7PA7
Number	Length		Surface
Number	ft	m	Surface
H1	44	13	Concrete

History
- Founded: 1920

Links
- Website: wmh.org
- Lists: Hospitals in Pennsylvania

Wayne Memorial Hospital is a 114-bed not-for-profit hospital located in Honesdale, Pennsylvania, United States.

== History and notable features ==
This hospital's patients include residents of Wayne, Pike, and Lackawanna County, Pennsylvania as well as Sullivan County, New York. Wayne Memorial first opened in 1920. The hospital is a Medicare Dependent Hospital.

In 2016, several new services, including a helipad and a cardiac catheterization lab, were added to the hospital. On October 3, 2017, it was announced that the hospital was granted Adult Level IV trauma center accreditation by the Pennsylvania Trauma Systems Foundation, effective November 1, 2017.
