= Ohio Valley Hospital =

Not-for-profit hospital in Kennedy Township, Pennsylvania

Coordinates: 40.47223°N 80.09119°W

Ohio Valley Hospital, also known as Heritage Valley Kennedy from 2019 to 2025, is a defunct not-for-profit hospital in Kennedy Township, Allegheny County, Pennsylvania, United States. Located near McKees Rocks, the hospital was a 124-bed facility that served Pittsburgh's western suburbs. It opened in the 1890s and closed in 2025. The hospital included a nursing school operated in conjunction with California University of Pennsylvania, and a radiography school in conjunction with La Roche College. It also had a wound care center, a pain treatment center, a senior living community, and a cataract and eye care center.

== History ==
The hospital was founded in the 1890s as McKees Rocks General Hospital by Samuel McCune Black, a doctor who owned it for a few years before transferring it to a public association in 1902. Annabell McAnulty was the first nurse to graduate from the nursing program in 1904.

The hospital officially became known as Ohio Valley General Hospital in 1906, when it was located in Norwood, a neighborhood of Stowe Township, Pennsylvania. In 1930, the Sisters of the Holy Family of Nazareth, took over management of the hospital, keeping it a non-sectarian, community hospital.

Ohio Valley Hospital moved to its current location, the former Heckel farm in Kennedy Township, in 1949. Its School of Nursing expanded there in 1959, and its School of Radiography formed in 1963. The hospital's Medical Office Building opened in 1988. Its campus expanded to include a Wound Care Center, Pain Treatment Center, and senior living facilities in 2000. In 2014, the hospital rebranded from Ohio Valley General Hospital to simply Ohio Valley Hospital. Ohio Valley Hospital was also an owner of Northwest EMS Ambulance Service.

As of 2019, Ohio Valley Hospital was a subsidiary of Heritage Valley Health System. On October 11, 2019, Heritage Valley Health System formally announced that Ohio Valley Hospital was renamed to Heritage Valley Kennedy as part of the hospital's integration into the health system.

On April 11, 2025, it was announced that the hospital would shut down, with the exception of the Medical Office Building. Main services such as ER, Inpatient Behavioral Health, Outpatient Surgery and Rehabilitation would be transferred to neighboring Heritage Valley locations. The School of Nursing was also affected by this closure. The hospital closed June 30, 2025.

== School of Nursing ==
The Ohio Valley Hospital School of Nursing offered a 20-month, 27 college credit, and 45 nursing credit program. The program included clinical experiences in other local hospitals.
