= Maternity care deserts in the United States =

Counties that lack maternity care resources

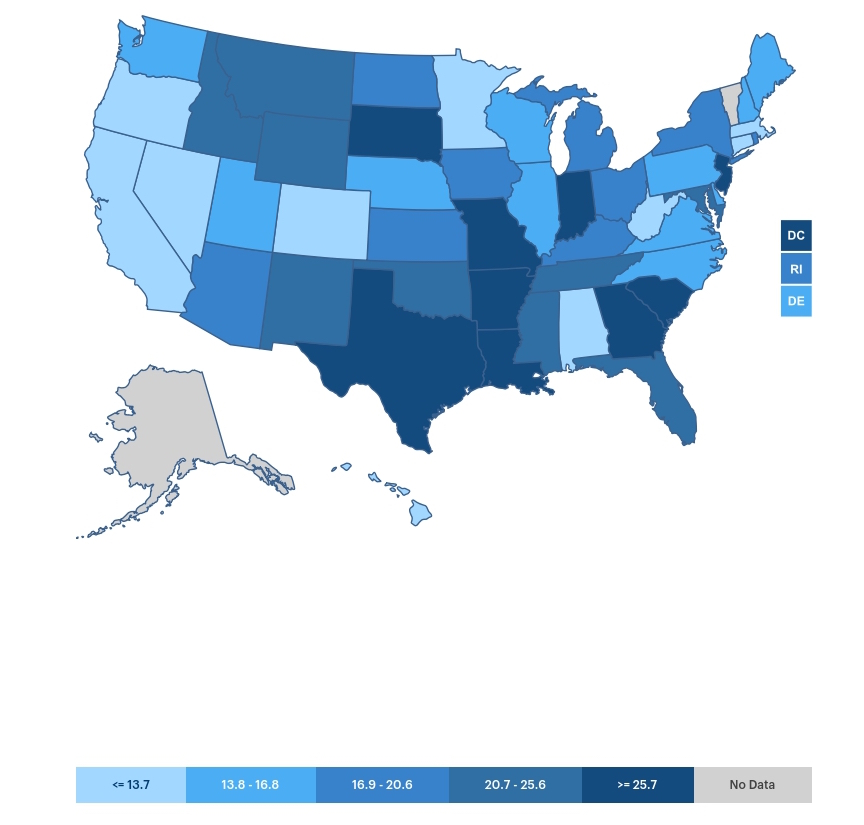
US map of maternal mortality

Maternity care deserts in the United States, also known as maternal care deserts, are counties that lack maternity care resources. The March of Dimes defines a maternity care desert as a county that has no hospitals or birth centers offering obstetric care and no obstetric providers. As of 2020 March of Dimes classified 1095 of 3139 of U.S. counties (34.9%) as maternity care deserts. Its 2022 report indicated an increase of nearly 2%, with 1119 of 3142 US counties (35.6%) considered maternity care deserts, affecting a population of over 5.6 million women. People living in maternity care deserts may have to travel longer distances to receive care, which is associated with higher costs and a greater risk of pregnancy complications.

The March of Dimes also classifies counties as having low access to maternal care if the county has one hospital or less offering obstetric care, fewer than 60 obstetric providers per 10,000 births and 10% (or greater) of women have no health insurance. Counties were classified as moderate access if they met the requirements of having low access to maternity care but the % of women with no insurance was less than 10%. A county with full access to maternity care had two or more hospitals with obstetric care facilities and 60 or more obstetric providers per 10,000 births.

Maternity care deserts are associated with high maternal mortality rates. Since 2018, there has been a 4% increase in maternity care deserts in the U.S. In the United States, up to 60,000 women a year experience severe maternal morbidity, life-threatening complications as a result of pregnancy, resulting in up to 700 pregnancy-related deaths annually. Maternal morbidity displays decades-long racial, geographical, and socioeconomic disparities. The United States is one of two countries worldwide that has reported significantly increased maternal mortality since 2000.

== Contributing factors ==
=== Race ===
Race plays a role in maternal mortality. In 2021, the maternal mortality rate for Black women was 69.9 deaths per 100,000 live births. This is 2.6 times the rate for White women. Approximately 1 in 6 Black infants were born in maternity care deserts and 1 in 4 Native American babies were born in maternity care deserts. Women who identify as American Indian or Alaska Native (AIAN) form 2.2% of the population of women in the U.S., and around 13% of them gave birth in maternity care deserts. They are more likely to experience negative outcomes including pre-term delivery, infant mortality, maternal morbidity, and maternal mortality.

=== Rural communities ===
Two in three maternity care deserts are in rural counties. Since 2004, rural communities in America have seen a decrease in obstetric services in hospitals. Between 2004 and 2016 obstetric services have decreased from 54% to 45%. Rural areas have a higher number of people on Medicaid and because Medicaid covers less than private insurance for childbirth, rural hospitals are unable to support obstetric care fiscally or through necessary staffing. When care units shut down, the healthcare workers who are able to provide maternity care might leave the area, potentially creating a new desert.

=== Restrictions on abortion services ===
The overturning of Roe v. Wade and changing abortion policy has led to a decrease in access to abortion care across the United States. 3.7 million women (about 5.8% of all women of reproductive age) live in both a maternity care desert and somewhere that has no access to abortion services. States and counties with abortion restrictions have fewer maternity care providers, with a 32% lower ratio of obstetricians and a 59% lower ratio of certified nurse midwives compared to states with abortion access. This disparity has increased the prevalence of maternity care deserts in recent years.

== Policies ==
Since 1991, the United States government has passed policies to reduce infant and maternal mortality through programs including Healthy Start. Healthy Start was first funded by President George H. W. Bush under Section 301 of the Public Health Services Act. It was further authorized by Congress under the Children's Health Act of 2000, signed by President Clinton, which funded prenatal care and support for children and mothers through early childhood).

In 2020, the Division of Reproductive Health of the Centers for Disease Control and Prevention (CDC) launched a national "Hear Her" campaign called to raise awareness of danger signs during and following pregnancy and to improve communication between pregnant or postpartum people, support systems, and health care providers.

Federally Qualified Health Centers (FQHC) receive federal money through the Department of Health Resources and Services and provide care for underserved populations or areas. FQHCs fill maternity care gaps by providing reimbursements through Medicaid, which helps providers receive reimbursement for their services. In Houston, one FQHC that provided maternity care increased the number of women who received prenatal care by 44%. The Affordable Care Act increased funding for FQHCs between 2011 and 2015. As of December 2021, 48% of rural counties did not have any FQHC. Urban counties had an average of 3.5 FQHCs per county while rural counties had an average of 1. Half of the counties with no FQHC were also classified as maternity care deserts. Increasing FQHCs can improve maternity care deserts.

Doulas:A doula is a trained maternal support professional who offers emotional, informational and/or psycho-social care during pregnancy, childbirth and/or the postpartum periods. Doulas do not replace but complement the role of clinicians (physicians, midwives and nurses). They provide culturally competent care and have been shown in multiple studies to decrease cesarean sections. Doula care has also been show to reduce the rate of postpartum depression and postpartum anxiety. Continuous support during labor may reduce rate of low 5 minute Apgar scores. Doulas may be a useful tool in decreasing disparities As of August 2022, six states were reimbursing doula services on Medicaid plans and 32 states had proposed legislative efforts to provide doula services or Medicaid reimbursements. There is evidence that this reduction in cesarean rates and improved outcomes may be a cost savings for state Medicaid programs. In order to increase the number of midwives, policy makers have invested in midwifery training programs to make the field more accessible.

Telehealth has been shown to improve obstetric care and early abortion care. Telehealth can be a partial solution to providing care for women in rural areas with a lack of access to care nearby. Telehealth access also overlaps with broadband access as the biggest barrier to telehealth care is internet access.

Medicaid expansion is associated with lower maternal mortality, with 6-7 out of 100,000 fewer maternal deaths than states with no Medicaid expansion. The evidence suggests that long-term coverage before and after pregnancy can reduce rates of maternal mortality. As of 2023, 41 states have passed amendments that extend Medicaid coverage for 12 months, with 5 states planning on expanding access and two states providing limited expansion. This was originally introduced through an improvision through the American Rescue Plan. The option was made permanent by the Consolidated Appropriations Act 2023.

== Current response ==
Maternal health care has received more legislative attention since the end of Roe v. Wade. The Biden Harris administration has included the phrase "Maternity care deserts" in their blueprint to tackle maternal health in America. In September 2023 the U.S. Department of Health and Human Services announced 90 million dollars in funding to support the plan for tackling maternal care in America.

Bills in Relation Passed by 117th Congress
Bills	What it Does
Data Mapping to Save Moms' Lives Act	It calls on the Federal Communications Commission to include maternal mortality and severe maternal morbidity in its data on its broadband health mapping tool.
Maternal Health Quality Improvement Act of 2021	This bill provides authority to the Department of Health and Human Services to provide grants to support care networks for maternal health in rural areas.
Protecting Moms Who Served	This bill directs the Department of Veterans Affairs to implement the maternity care coordination program.

== At the state level: Texas ==
46.5% of counties in Texas are maternity care deserts and 4.6% of women in Texas do not have birthing centers within 30 minutes from themselves. 66% of counties in Texas report high rates of chronic health conditions and preterm births, which can worsen maternal health outcomes.

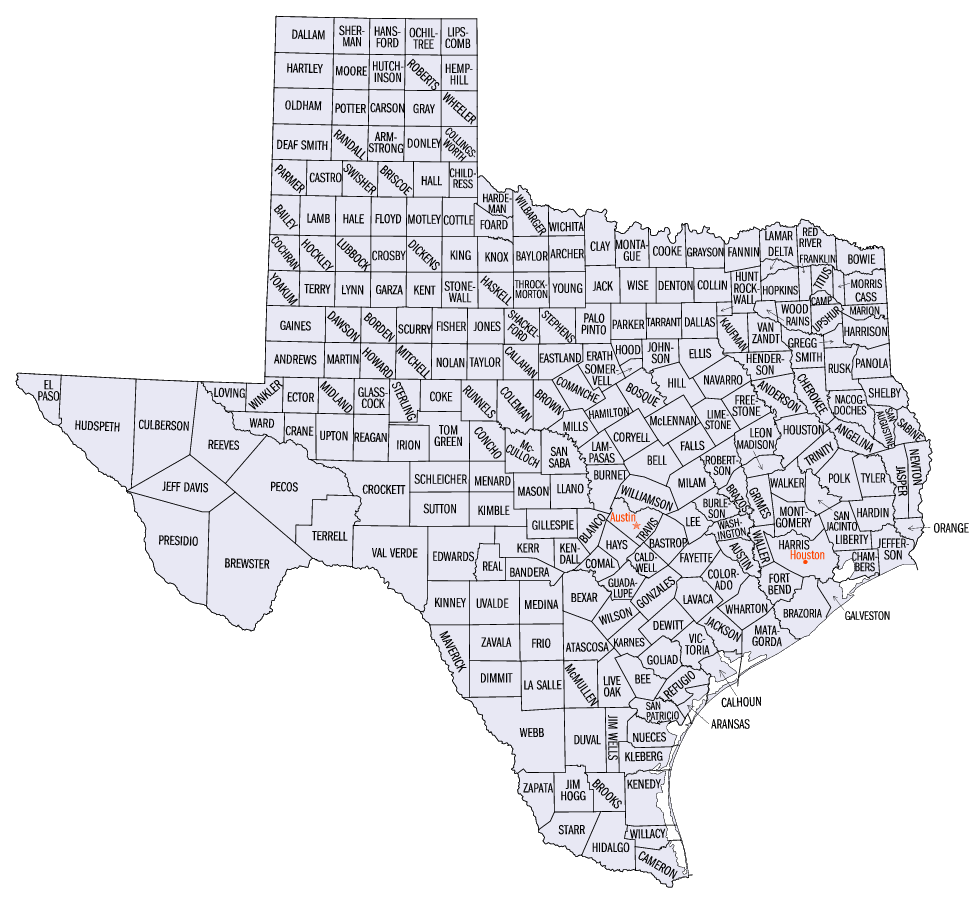
Map of Texas counties

20.4% of women in Texas have inadequate prenatal care compared to 14.8% for the US as a whole. Socioeconomics also impacts prenatal care in Texas. BIPOC women who live in areas with high socioeconomic vulnerability have a 44% increased likelihood of inadequate socioeconomic vulnerability compared to areas with low socioeconomic vulnerability.

Based on the CDC initiative, the Texas Department of State Health Services (DSHS) started its own Hear Her campaign of education and resources to help people recognize urgent maternal warning signs and know when they need to seek help. The campaign also encourages doctors and medical providers to listen to women.

The United States Health Resources and Services Administration funds the Rural Maternity and Obstetrics Management Strategies (RMOMS) Program In September 2019. RMOMS provides funds to programs that build networks to coordinate continuum of care and use telehealth and specialty care in areas that need it the most. From 2019 to 2020 the Texas RMOMS Comprehensive Maternal Care Network (TX-RMOMS) served 1,644 women and delivered 1,230 babies.

The Texas Presumptive eligibility program allows hospitals to determine if individuals need short term Medicaid. Pregnant women can qualify for both prenatal care and care during pregnancy depending on the hospital's approval. In 2024 there will be a new March of Dimes "Mom & Baby Mobile Health Center" in Houston due to funding from Blue Cross and Blue Shield of Texas.

== At the state level: Massachusetts ==
In Massachusetts, 100% of counties are full access. 4.6% of people had no birthing hospital within 30 minutes. There is an overall low vulnerability to adverse outcomes due to the availability of reproductive health services.

9.7% of people received no or inadequate prenatal care.

As of December 8, 2023 Masshealth (Medicaid) announced a new benefit of allowing coverage of doula services for pregnant, birthing and post partum members.

== At the state level: Maine ==
The state of Maine is experiencing the rapid desertification of maternal care services in rural communities. It has been referred to as a silent public health crisis, as 11 hospital maternity units have closed in approximately the past decade, and more than half of Maine's 36 hospitals no longer offer labor and delivery services. In August 2026, MaineHealth announced decision to close the 12th L&D, despite significant community and statewide outrage and requests for a pause, and is slated to stop local services on December 18, 2026.

Maine's rural hospitals without labor and delivery services are a median 45-minute drive from the nearest birthing hospital, the longest such figure in New England. But this measures hospital-to-hospital travel, not the journey from each patient's home. Families in outlying communities may face substantially longer drives, compounded by weather, seasonal traffic, EMS response times, ambulance deserts and the need for specialized emergency obstetric care.

In March 2025, Maine EMS issued a statewide clinical bulletin specifically warning that obstetric unit closures could lead to more unplanned field births, more complications requiring hospital transfers, and more patients arriving at emergency departments without obstetric services.

In September 2026, Waterville Fire-Rescue reported its second ambulance delivery since the city's labor and delivery unit closed in March 2025. The second baby was delivered while the ambulance was traveling to Augusta.

In 2022, Maine established maternal and neonatal levels-of-care guidelines consistent with recommendations from the American College of Obstetricians and Gynecologists (ACOG). Despite this framework, Level I facilities, including Houlton Regional Hospital & Lincoln Hospital, have continued to face closure of their labor and delivery services.

For years, Maine researchers, clinicians, and policymakers have identified strategies to sustain rural obstetric services, including alternative reimbursement models, shared regional staffing, workforce recruitment incentives, midwife-led care, and coordinated emergency obstetric systems. These approaches are documented in Maine's 2025 rural maternity policy agenda and its ongoing Transforming Maternal Health initiative.

MaineHealth and Northern Light Health have made decisions to eliminate local maternity services without publicly demonstrating that the available preservation strategies were comprehensively implemented, tested, and independently evaluated before permanent closure decisions.

In August 2026, the Maine Legislatures Joint Committee on Health Coverage, Insurance, and Financial Services convened a special session to ask MaineHealth, a nonprofit health system, why they ignored the requests of current and prospective governor, bipartisan lawmakers, local leaders and the people served to stop the closure until an independent analysis could occur. MaineHealth CEO Andy Mueller claimed local recruitment and retention difficulties were due to an annual number under 200 births: "Bankers don't want to work in a bank where there's no deposits. Bakers don't want to work in a bakery where there's no flour”. Mueller’s analogy equates 130 annual births with having no patients at all, fundamentally misrepresenting the scope of obstetric care. MaineHealth reported 131 deliveries at Lincoln Hospital in 2025, representing approximately 262 maternal and newborn patients. However, delivery totals do not account for additional obstetric encounters, including evaluations for suspected labor, pregnancy complications, emergency stabilization, and transfers that do not result in an on-site birth. The American College of Obstetricians and Gynecologists (ACOG) reports that hospital obstetric triage volumes typically exceed birth volumes by 20–50%. Delivery counts alone therefore do not measure the full scope of obstetric services provided or the outcomes of emergency interventions.

Houlton Regional Hospital only provided 30 days notice before notifying staff and patients of the impending closure of their obstetric unit on May 2, 2025. Just 29 days after Houlton Regional Hospital closed its labor and delivery unit, Dr. Rose Fuchs, a family physician and former midwife, fought to keep a baby alive during a life-threatening umbilical cord prolapse until a remaining obstetric team could perform an emergency C-section. Houlton Regional Hospital declined to take the transport initially, despite EMTALA requirements. LifeFlight was unavailable due to poor weather and the closest birthing hospital was 90 minutes away. Mother and baby survived because of Dr. Fuchs immediate assessment and because specialized obstetric staff were still temporarily nearby during the hospital’s transition.

The analogy by Mueller, MaineHealth’s CEO, raises a fundamental question about the responsibilities of a nonprofit healthcare institution: Should access to essential, time-sensitive medical care be determined primarily by patient volume, or do healthcare systems have an obligation to maintain lifesaving emergency capacity, even when demand is unpredictable? This tension is reflected in the ongoing lawsuit challenging Lincoln Hospital’s closure, which alleges that MaineHealth failed to adequately assess community healthcare needs, the consequences of eliminating local maternity services, and the availability of alternatives before proceeding with its decision. In the lawsuit, a local pregnant woman filed a lawsuit against MaineHealth seeking to prevent the closure of Lincoln Hospital’s labor and delivery unit. A judge denied an initial emergency injunction, allowing MaineHealth’s board to proceed with its closure vote. In September, the complaint was amended to allege violations of Affordable Care Act community health needs assessment requirements and seek injunctive relief. MaineHealth has moved to dismiss the case.
