= Memorial Medical Center =

Memorial Medical Center may refer to:

- Memorial Medical Center (Modesto, California)
- Memorial Medical Center (Springfield, Illinois)
- Ochsner Baptist Medical Center, New Orleans, Louisiana, formerly known as Memorial Medical Center
- Memorial Medical Center (Las Cruces, New Mexico)
