= Good Shepherd Rehabilitation =

American non-profit rehabilitation network

Good Shepherd Rehabilitation is an independent, not-for-profit rehabilitation network headquartered in Allentown, Pennsylvania. Pediatric, adolescent and adult patients receive treatment at Good Shepherd for stroke; brain injury; spinal cord injury; bone and joint conditions; aches, pains and strains; cardiac and respiratory illnesses; chronic neurological conditions; and developmental disabilities.

Types of treatment include inpatient and outpatient rehabilitation for adults, adolescents and children; physical medicine and rehabilitation physician services; long-term care; long-term acute care; and supported independent living for people with disabilities. In all, Good Shepherd operates 30 facilities throughout eastern Pennsylvania.

== History ==
The Rev. John ("Papa") and Estella ("Mama") Raker founded the Good Shepherd Home in Allentown in February 1908 to care for orphaned children with disabilities.While serving as the director of the Lutheran Orphan Home in Topton, Pennsylvania, the Rev. Raker met a local woman who had a disabled son. The woman said she had no way to provide care for her son. However, the Rev. Raker had to turn the mother and boy away because the home's charter allowed only "healthy children."In 1907, the Rev. Raker moved to Grace Lutheran mission in South Allentown but insisted that he be allowed to do mission work among children with disabilities as time allowed. His regular pastoral work with the church, however, did not leave much time initially.Then, his wife gave birth to a daughter, Viola, who passed away in infancy. Following the funeral, the Rev. Raker received a letter from another local minister about a child with a disability named Viola Hunt, who he hoped someone could take in.Seeing it as an omen, the Rakers took Viola Hunt in, and she became the first resident of what is now Good Shepherd.

=== Expansion ===
Good Shepherd opened its rehabilitation hospital in Allentown in 1967 and expanded the facility in 1983.In August 1980, Good Shepherd opened Good Shepherd Home - Raker Center on its South Allentown campus, providing a long-term care home for individuals with severe disabilities, such as cerebral palsy, muscular dystrophy, multiple sclerosis, spina bifida and traumatic brain injuries. Good Shepherd opened a second long-term care home in Bethlehem, Pennsylvania in 2000.

In 2003, Good Shepherd opened Supported Independent Living Apartments on its South Allentown campus.

Good Shepherd and Penn Medicine formed Good Shepherd Penn Partners in 2008 to provide rehabilitation and therapy services in the greater Philadelphia area and parts of New Jersey. Good Shepherd Penn Partners changed names to GSPP Rehabilitation in 2024.Good Shepherd opened a pediatric inpatient rehabilitation unit in Bethlehem in 2009.

In 2022, Good Shepherd started a training program at Good Shepherd Rehabilitation Hospital for candidates in the field of physiatry in partnership with the Temple University Hospital Physical Medicine and Rehabilitation (PM&R) Residency Program.

=== Good Shepherd Today ===
In 2023, Good Shepherd opened a free-standing, 123,000-square-foot, 76-bed inpatient rehabilitation hospital in Center Valley, Pennsylvania.In partnership with Moravian University, Good Shepherd also opened the Empower+ Makerspace and 3D Printing Lab in 2023 at Good Shepherd Rehabilitation Hospital.Good Shepherd also opened the Fleming Center for Robotics in Rehabilitation in 2023.

In 2025, Good Shepherd and Lehigh University conducted a Community Health Needs Assessment to collect information on the needs of autism and other neurodivergent conditions in the greater Lehigh Valley.

In June 2026, Good Shepherd announced it would open the first Autism and Neurodevelopmental Wellness Center in the greater Lehigh Valley region in fall 2026. The center will be located on Cetronia Road in Upper Macungie Township.
