= St. Mary Medical Center (Langhorne) =

Coordinates: 40°12′06.5″N 74°55′26.8″W

- Trinity Health

Geography
- Location: 1201 Newtown-Langhorne Rd, Langhorne, Pennsylvania, United States

Organization
- Care system: Non-profit hospital

Services
- Emergency department: Level II Trauma Center
- Beds: 371

History
- Founded: 1860 (original); 1973 (current)

Links
- Website: www.stmaryhealthcare.org
- Lists: Hospitals in Pennsylvania

St. Mary Medical Center is a non-profit hospital located in Langhorne, Pennsylvania. The hospital has a Level II Trauma Center and employs over 700 physicians and 1,100 volunteers.

The hospital focuses on non-invasive treatments, adult and pediatric emergency services, rehabilitation and health and wellness programs. St. Mary Medical Center merged with Catholic Health East in 2013 and is currently a part of Trinity Health.

== History ==
The original St. Mary Hospital was opened in Philadelphia in 1860 after inspiration from the Sisters of St. Francis. The hospital moved to Bucks County in 1973 opening a new hospital on land previously used as a horse farm.

In 1996, St. Mary Hospital was renamed to St. Mary Medical Center and was designated as "an Eastern Region member of Catholic Health Initiatives".

In 2012, St. Mary Medical Center expanded its campus by adding a helicopter landing pad for patient transport.

St. Mary discouraged nurses from joining unions. In August 2019, nurses "voted to unionize with PASNAP".
