= Excela Health =

American healthcare organization

Coordinates: 40.145263°N 79.549922°W

- Type: Private (not-for-profit)
- Industry: Medical
- Founded: July 2004
- Headquarters: Greensburg, Pennsylvania
- Area served: Western Pennsylvania
- Key people: John Sphon, CEO Carol Fox, MD CMO Helen Burns, PhD CNO
- Products: hospitals
- Website: http://www.excelahealth.org/

Excela Health is a not-for-profit health organization that includes three licensed, acute care hospitals, two free-standing outpatient surgery centers, home care and hospice, physician practices, a durable medical equipment company and other facilities and services. Formally incorporated in 2004, Excela Health is governed by a single Board of Trustees. Its headquarters is located in Greensburg, Pennsylvania.

Excela Health employs 4,800 employees and credentials 800 physicians and allied health professionals. It also serves parts of Fayette and Indiana counties.

Three charitable foundations exist to benefit the clinical and operational needs of Excela Health's hospitals and affiliated health care services. They include the Westmoreland/Frick Hospital Foundation with its two branches - the Frick Hospital Foundation and the Westmoreland Hospital Foundation - and the Latrobe Hospital.

== Health facilities ==
=== Frick Hospital ===
A 102 licensed-bed hospital located in Mount Pleasant, offers services including general acute care, surgical services, award-winning emergency services, a sleep center, rehabilitation services and more. In addition to modem operating rooms and needed support functions, there is a short procedure unit for minor outpatient surgeries. The hospital's Women's Care Services offer a range of breast health services and bone density scanning. The Outpatient Services Center features a centralized outpatient registration area with quick, convenient patient registration surrounded by a variety of outpatient testing areas and services, drawing together nuclear medicine, pulmonary function lab, stress lab, EKG, EEG, echo cardiography, x-ray, ultrasound and mammography for a "one-stop" shop.

=== Latrobe Hospital ===
Located in the eastern section of Westmoreland County, Latrobe Hospital offers acute, surgical and specialized services. A 196-licensed-bed hospital, Latrobe features mammography, bone density services . Extensive cardiac diagnostic testing and treatment abound with a cardiac rehabilitation program available for post surgery patients. The hospital also features a state of the art newly renovated emergency department, a sleep center; diabetes center and endocrine clinic; outpatient surgery and short procedure suites; emergency services; wellness programs and more. Home to Excela Health's child and adolescent inpatient unit, Latrobe Hospital does not offer child and adolescent health services. It is also home to Excela Health's geriatric assessment service, and is the site of the health system's Center for Neurosciences. A Family Medicine Residency Program at Latrobe Hospital, affiliated with the Jefferson Medical College of Thomas Jefferson University, allows physicians hands-on experience flexible enough to prepare them for rural, suburban or urban medical practice.

=== Westmoreland Hospital ===
Westmoreland Hospital, located in central Westmoreland County, is a hospital and regional referral center with 364 licensed beds. The Family Additions Maternity Center offers maternity care in a home-like atmosphere featuring labor-delivery-recovery suites (LDRs) with operating suites for Cesarean or high risk births, and a Special Care (Level II) Nursery. There are also services for women planning or considering pregnancy and gynecological services. Behavioral Health Services feature an adult inpatient unit as well as outpatient services for adults. Additionally, the Westmoreland campus offers a breast health center; outpatient services including the SurgiCenter at Westmoreland and the Short Stay Surgery unit; sleep center; diabetes services and endocrine clinic; digestive disorders center; pain center; fixed site and open MRI units; a large critical care unit with an intensivist program (offering 24-hour-a-day, in-house physician specialist coverage in the critical care areas), and emergency care. It is also home to the interventional Center for Cardiovascular Medicine encompassing cardiac catheterization labs, electrophysiology labs and open heart surgery.
