= Guthrie Robert Packer Hospital =

- Guthrie

Geography
- Location: 1 Guthrie Square, Sayre, Pennsylvania, United States
- Coordinates: 41°58′49.055″N 76°31′13.786″W

Organization
- Care system: Private
- Type: Teaching
- Affiliated university: Mansfield University, Geisinger Commonwealth School of Medicine

Services
- Emergency department: Level I trauma center
- Beds: 254

Helipads
- Helipad: (FAA LID: PS81)
Number	Length		Surface
Number	ft	m	Surface
H1	50	15	Asphalt-concrete
H2	50	15	Asphalt-concrete

History
- Opened: 1885

Links
- Website: www.guthrie.org/location/guthrie-robert-packer-hospital
- Lists: Hospitals in Pennsylvania

Guthrie Robert Packer Hospital is a rural teaching hospital in Sayre, Pennsylvania. It was founded as Robert Packer Hospital in 1885, making it the oldest hospital in the Twin Tiers of Pennsylvania and New York. The hospital is a primary stroke center and level I trauma center. It has received numerous awards, including being named one of the Truven Top 50 Cardiovascular Hospitals 10 times since 2001, "America’s 100 Best Hospitals for Coronary Intervention" by HealthGrades in 2017, 2018, and 2019 and receiving a Bariatric Surgery Excellence Award in 2019. It has also received a Center of Distinction Award for wound care and hyperbarics in 2018.

== Early history ==
Robert Asa Packer, son of Asa Packer, was a business magnate and president of the Northern Division of the Lehigh Valley Railroad. After his death in 1883, his mansion (built 1879–80) sat empty and was inherited by his sister, Mary Packer Cummings. She was approached by Rev. W. B. Morrow, the rector of the Church of the Redeemer, with plans for a hospital and she donated the home to the Lehigh Valley Railroad Company on February 14, 1885 to be used for that purpose. She also offered to pay for any required alterations. In turn, a corporation formed for the care of "injured and sick persons without distinction on account of creed, race, or nationality," and a charter was granted for the hospital one month later on March 16.

Robert Packer Hospital was dedicated on July 13, 1885, the house surgeon being Dr. Franklin M. Stephens, with the first patient, Alonzo House, arriving two weeks later. The majority of the patients in the first years were injured while working for the Lehigh Valley Railroad and Sayre Locomotive Shops. The hospital was known for its use of aseptic techniques, only resorting to amputation for infection once in the first five years. Despite the fact that patients generally feared hospitals, in 1893 and 1894 that the hospital often went over capacity and had to turn away admissions. Some patients would wait weeks for admission.

Early on, money was set aside for repairs to the old building and construction of a new ward, but it turned out not to be enough. Despite rarely having vacant beds, the hospital still went further into debt, largely due to not charging patients for their care.

== History after Dr. Guthrie's arrival ==
January 10, 1910, Dr. Donald Guthrie succeeded the surgeon-in-chief Dr. Ott, who had died the year prior. He founded the Guthrie Medical Group and expanded services in the hospital to model it after the Mayo Clinic, where he had completed his residency. In 1912, Mary Packer Cummings died and willed funds to build a children's ward. By 1920, Dr. Guthrie had added 11 more physicians to the group. Only eight years later, the four story Guthrie Clinic building opened with 27 physicians.

The hospital and its buildings were considered to be some of the most advanced in the country. In September, 1916, Ornan H. Waltz noted in Modern Hospital, "Sayre, Pa., a city of only eight thousand people, can boast of one of the most serviceable institutions in the country".

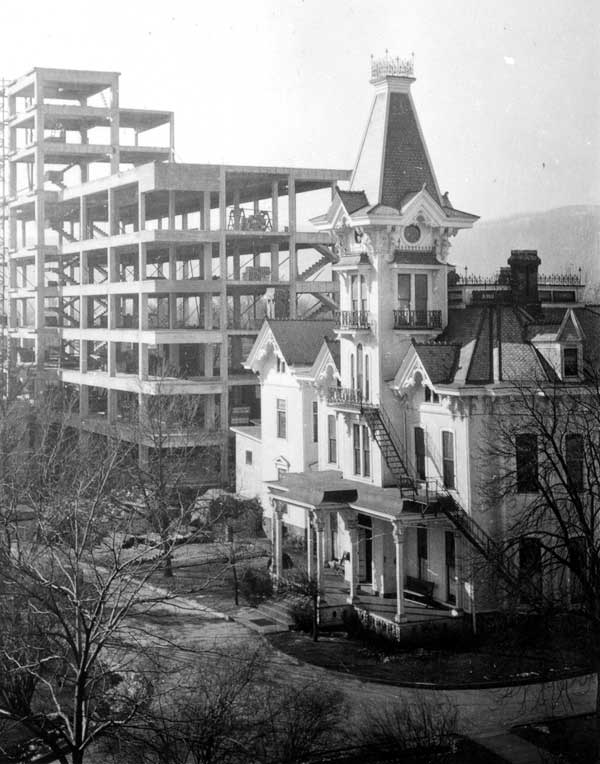
Robert Packer Hospital, ca. 1934

A major portion of the hospital burned down in a fire on May 3, 1933, forcing the hospital administration to successfully raise funds for a larger updated building for which they had been planning since 1929. At the time, some of the patients were moved to Tioga County General Hospital. The hospital received a Public Works Administration loan in the amount of $420,000 to complete the new building meant to house 285 beds, which was opened on December 6, 1934.

Multiple changes have taken place since then, including addition of new buildings, operating suites, educational buildings, and an emergency department. 1981 saw the formation of the Guthrie Medical Center, a new corporation and restructuring of the existing Guthrie Clinic. In 1986, the hospital switched its focus to taking care of trauma patients, adding an $85,000 heliport, establishing trauma-related hospital procedures, and bringing in appropriate staffing.

== Education ==
Robert Packer Hospital had its first intern in 1887, at a time when most physicians did not do internships. Its first residency began in 1923 in partnership with the University of Pennsylvania Graduate School of Medicine and Hahnemann Medical School, and was in general surgery. Five years later, a residency in medicine was added.

The hospital employed its first Director of Medical Education in 1967, also breaking ground for the Carl V. S. Patterson Education Building. The same year, the School of Nursing was accredited by the National League for Nursing. In 1987, nursing education changed at Robert Packer Hospital and it no longer offered a diploma program. Instead, it partnered with Mansfield University in offering the Bachelor of Science in Nursing degree.

As of July 2021, the hospital has physician residencies in emergency medicine, family medicine, internal medicine, general surgery, orthopedic surgery, anesthesiology, and fellowships in cardiology, gastroenterology, and pulmonology and critical care. Additionally, the hospital has a nursing residency, pharmacy residency, and is the Guthrie Campus of the Geisinger Commonwealth School of Medicine. Of historical note, it used to have residencies in neurosurgery, pathology, pediatrics, radiology, and urology.
