= Flavin prenyltransferase (UbiX) =

flavin prenyltransferase
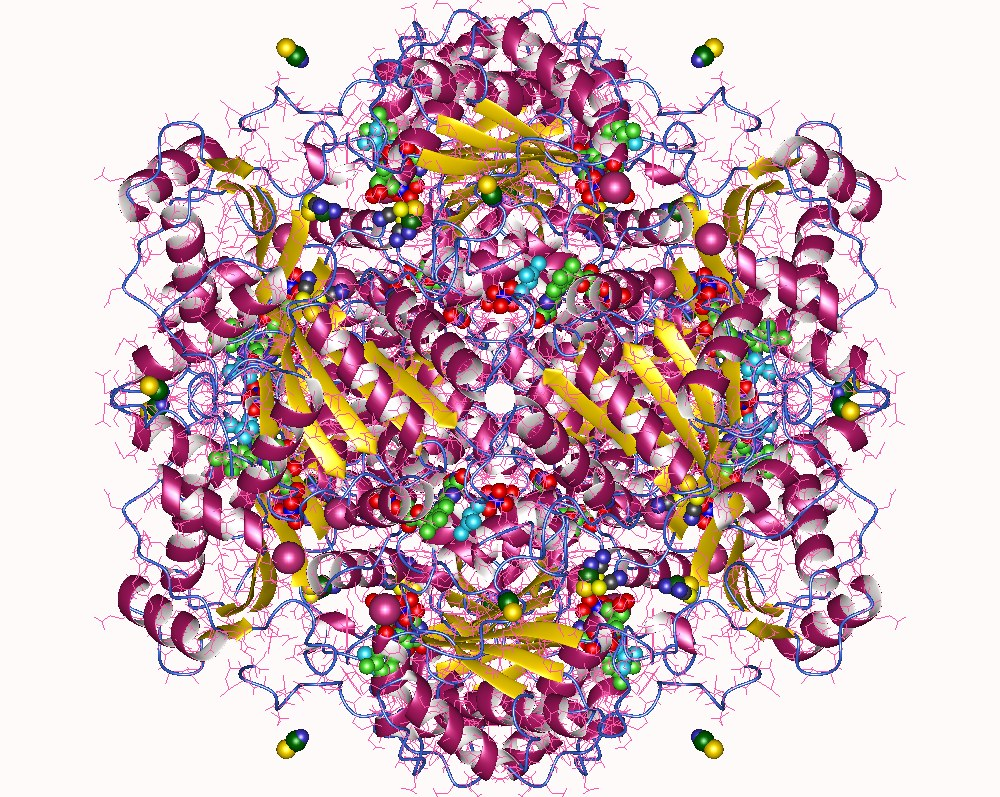
- Flavin prenyltransferase homododekamer, Pseudomonas aeruginosa

Identifiers
- EC no.: 2.5.1.129

Databases
- BRENDA: enzyme data
- ExPASy: NiceZyme view
- KEGG: enzyme entry
- MetaCyc: metabolic pathway
- Rhea: reactions
- PDB structures: RCSB PDB PDBe PDBsum
Search
- PMC: articles
- PubMed: articles
- NCBI: proteins

UbiX is a flavin prenyltransferase, catalysing the addition of dimethylallyl-monophosphate (DMAP) or dimethylallyl-pyrophosphate (DMAPP) onto the N5 and C6 positions of FMN, culminating in the formation of the prenylated FMN (prFMN) cofactor. The enzyme is involved in the ubiquinone biosynthesis pathway in E. coli, from where it gets its name UbiX is associated with the UbiD enzymes, as prFMN is utilised by UbiD enzymes in their function as reversible decarboxylases. Unusually for a prenyltransferase, UbiX is not metal dependent.

Following the elucidation of prFMN's structure in the active site of Fdc1 from aspergillus niger (AnFdc1), the prenyltransferase activity of UbiX was investigated. Incubation of UbiX from P. Aeruginosa with oxidised FMN and DMAP, followed by reduction with sodium dithionite, lead to the formation of prFMN^{reduced}. The same procedure followed by re-oxidation under aerobic conditions lead to prFMN^{radical}. Anaerobic incubation of apo-AnFdc1 with prFMN^{reduced,} followed by exposure to oxygen, lead to decarboxylase activity. However, incubation with prFMN^{radical} did not afford activity to apo-AnFdc1. This suggests that the prFMN^{reduced} form can be correctly oxidised by UbiD/Fdc1 to the corresponding prFMN^{iminium} (Figure 2).

== Mechanism ==
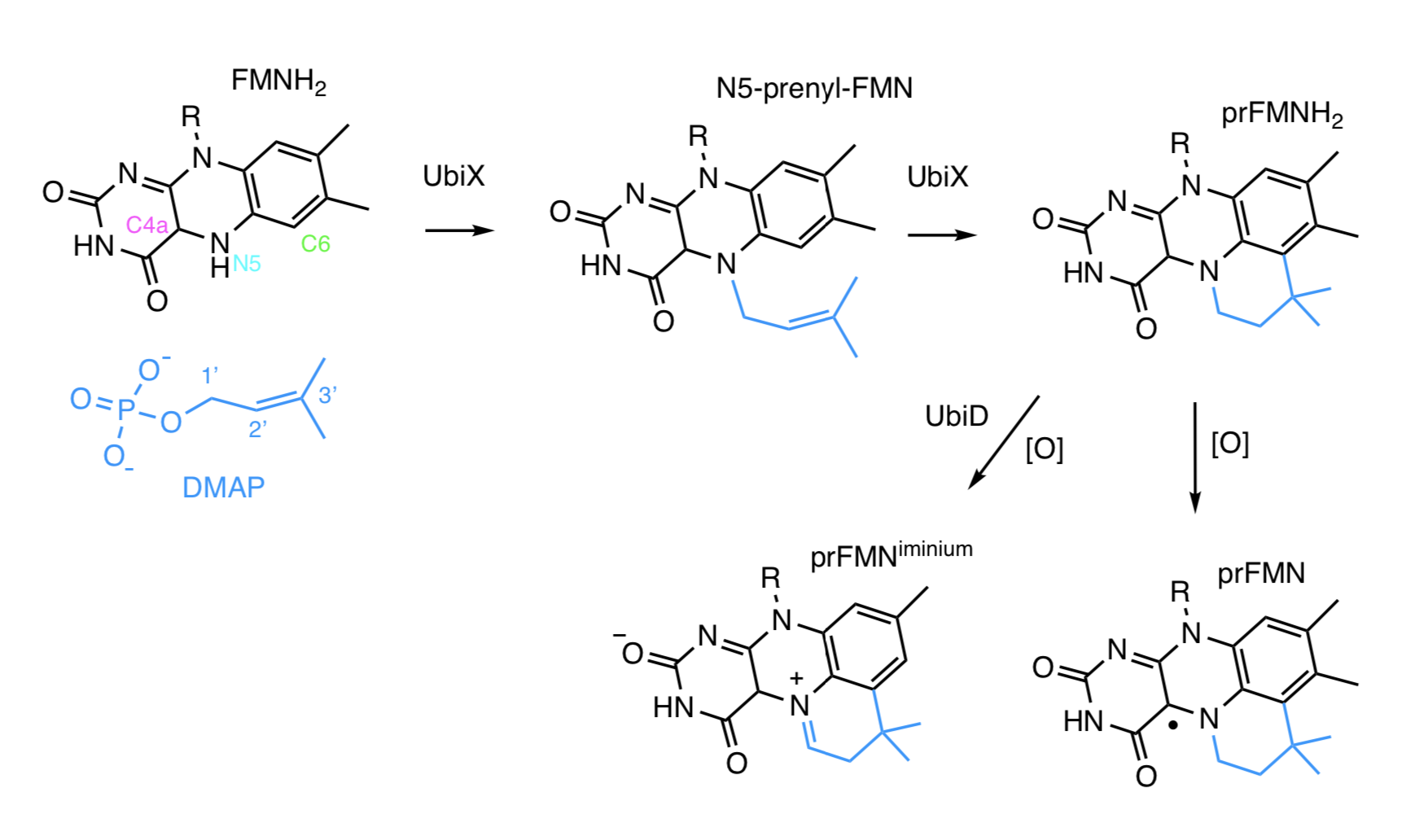
Figure.1 Proposed catalytic mechanism for PaUbiX. Figure adapted from.

P.aeruginosa UbiX (PaUbiX) crystal structures revealed that the DMAP substrate is positioned directly above the FMN isoalloxazine ring and that the N5-C1’ dimethylallyl adduct forms first as a prerequisite to formation of the C6-C3’ bond and creation of the fourth non-aromatic ring (Figure.1). Several conserved residues were found to be binding the DMAP phosphate group, with the residue E140 suggested to act as a proton donor to enhance the phosphate leaving group. The study suggested that the two residues, S15 and E49, play an important role in N5 deprotonation and N5-C1’ bond formation (Figure 1), the mutation E49Q severely affected PaUbiX’s ability to activate AnFdc1 and crystal structures of E49Q did not reveal a N5-C1’ bond within 1–5 seconds following reduction and rapid freezing, in contrast to wild type (WT) PaUbiX, for which the N5-C1’ bond was observed within 1–5 seconds. This study was unable to trap any intermediates during formation of the C3’-C6 bond, but suggested C6 nucleophilic attack on the C3’ carbocation occurs concomitant with or following protonation of the C2’ via the bound phosphate. The resultant cyclohexadiene adduct was then postulated to form the final product via aromatisation concomitant with proton abstraction via S15 and E49. The mechanism suggested for PaUbiX is shown in Figure 1.

These findings were updated in 2019, with a new publication showing that the first step, the N5-C1' bond formation, is likely to occur via an S_{N}1 mechanism. This leads to the strict requirement for a substrate dimethylallyl moiety to initiate the reaction. The same paper showed that the N5 alkylation occurred whether it was a DMAP or DMAPP substrate in the DMAPP specific UbiX from aspergillus niger (AnUbiX); therefore, this step is independent of the beta phosphate present in DMAPP. In the same AnUbiX enzyme, they showed that the Fridel-Crafts alkylation of the flavin C6 only occurs using the DMAPP substrate. Mutations to the phosphate binding site of PaUbiX were also unable to form the C6-C3' bond, but could be rescued through the addition of phosphate. This confirmed that UbiX catalyses the formation of the C6-C3' bond through phosphate (and pyrophosphate) acid-base catalysis.
