= Homewood Cemetery =

Cemetery in Pittsburgh, Pennsylvania, US

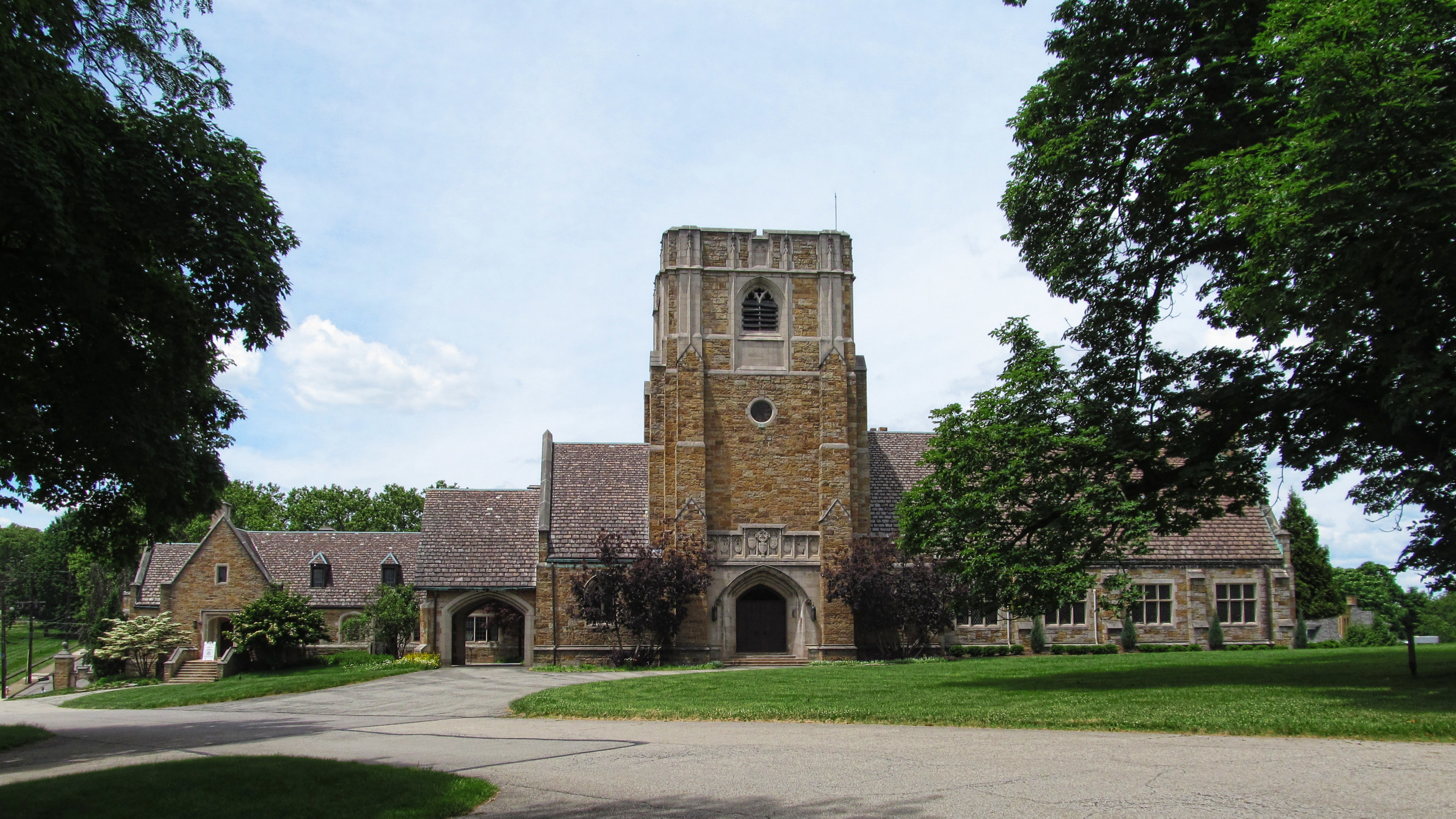
- Homewood Cemetery chapel
- Interactive map of Homewood Cemetery

Details
- Established: 1878
- Location: 1599 South Dallas Ave., Squirrel Hill, Pittsburgh, Pennsylvania
- Country: United States
- Coordinates: 40.441°N 79.909°W
- Type: Urban
- Size: 650-acre (2.6 km^{2})
- No. of graves: 77,000+
- Website: Official website

Homewood Cemetery is a historic lawn park cemetery in Pittsburgh, Pennsylvania, United States. Opened in 1878, it is located in Point Breeze and is bordered by Frick Park, the neighborhood of Squirrel Hill, and the smaller Smithfield Cemetery.

== History ==
Homewood Cemetery was established in 1878 on approximately 175 acres that had formerly been part of the East End estate of William Wilkins. It was created to provide a suitable burial place for the eastern section of Pittsburgh. From its founding, Homewood was a non-denominational and non-discriminatory cemetery, serving Pittsburgh residents across religious and cultural communities. Developed as a lawn-park cemetery, Homewood reflected a late nineteenth-century movement toward more uniform and naturalistic cemetery landscapes than those associated with the earlier rural cemetery tradition.

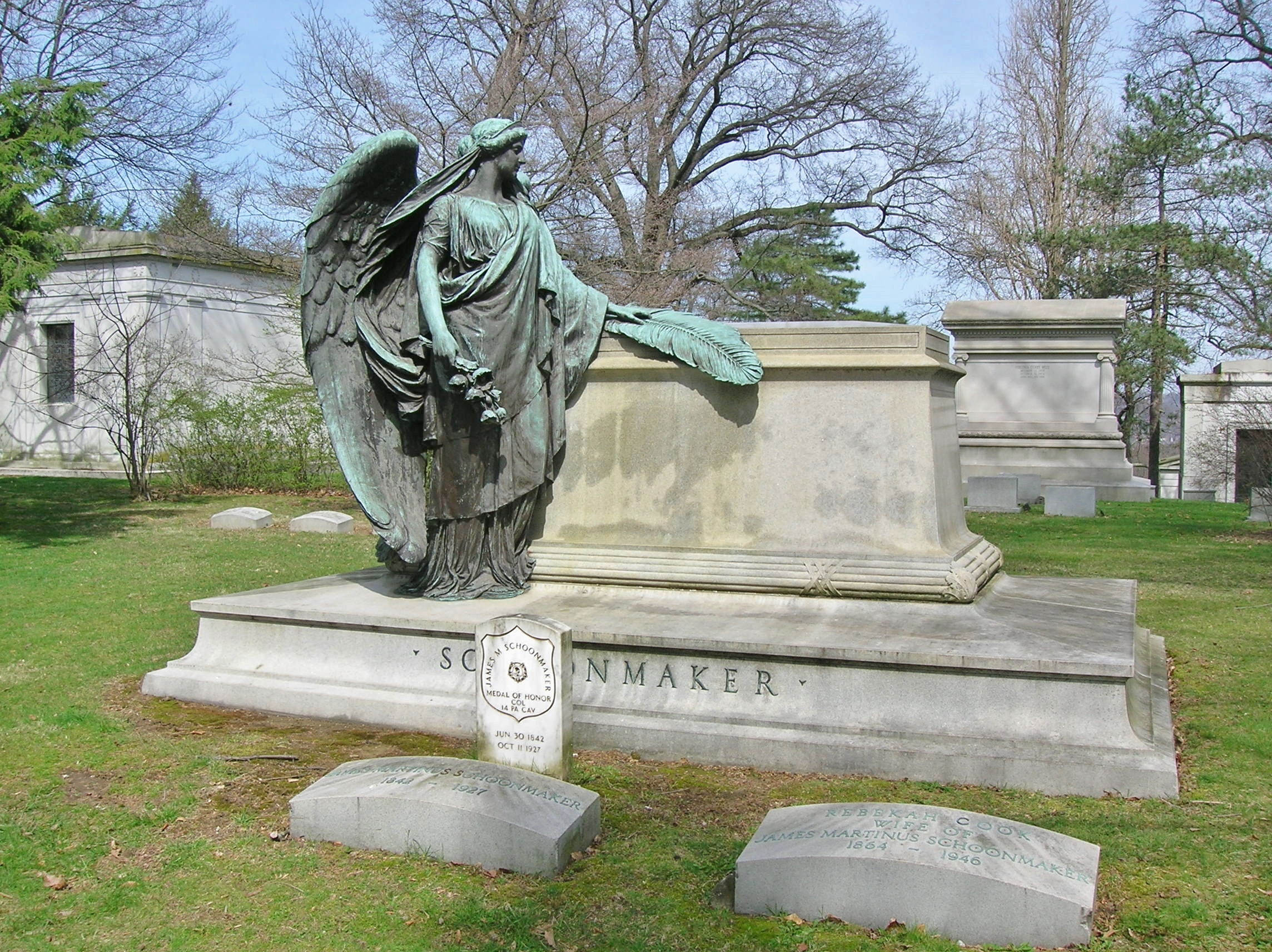
Schoonmaker monument (Jakob Otto Schweizer, sculptor)

== Landscape and architecture ==
Homewood's lawn-park design emphasized open vistas, broad lawns, and a more streamlined landscape than the denser plantings and elaborate layouts associated with earlier rural cemeteries. William Allen, superintendent of the cemetery from 1907 to 1935, had previously worked at Mount Auburn Cemetery in Cambridge, Massachusetts, and incorporated aspects of rural cemetery landscape design into Homewood's grounds. Some trees from the former estate of William Wilkins, which became the site of Homewood Cemetery, were retained as the landscape developed.

The cemetery's principal entrance complex was erected in 1923 and designed by architects Colbert T. A. MacClure and Albert H. Spahr. It includes a Gothic Revival chapel and a Tudor Revival gatehouse and administration building. Homewood also contains numerous late nineteenth- and early twentieth-century family mausoleums, including Romanesque Revival and Beaux-Arts examples associated with prominent Pittsburgh families. Among the cemetery's distinctive funerary monuments is the pyramid mausoleum of William Harry Brown and his family, a 35-foot Egyptian-inspired structure that became one of Homewood's recognizable landmarks. The cemetery has been a designated arboretum since 2014; more than 40 species of trees are represented throughout the grounds.

== Preservation and interpretation ==
The Homewood Cemetery Historical Fund was established on July 11, 1989, as a nonprofit organization to promote the appreciation and preservation of the cemetery's cultural, historical, and natural resources. The fund has supported preservation and restoration projects, historical documentation, and public interpretation of the cemetery. In 2010, a yearlong project documented the stained-glass windows and architecture of Homewood's private family mausoleums, producing more than 460 photographs that became part of the cemetery's records.

== Chinese burial section ==
Beginning in 1901, the Chinese Consolidated Benevolent Association purchased and organized burial lots in Section 3 of Homewood Cemetery for members of Pittsburgh's Chinese community. Approximately 250 Chinese Americans are buried in the area. The lots were originally intended for temporary burials, reflecting a practice in which remains could later be disinterred and returned to China for reburial with family ancestors. A 1937 United Press report, for example, described the planned burial of William Yic at Homewood for ten years before his remains were to be removed and sent to China. Additional adjoining lots were acquired in 1903, 1918, and 1929, but many burials became permanent when repatriation was not possible. In 2018, a grant from the Hillman Foundation supported the restoration and resetting of nearly 200 markers in the section.

== Notable interments ==
=== Business leaders ===
- Edward Jay Allen (1830–1915), businessman
- Michael Late Benedum (1869–1959), businessman, co-founder of Benedum-Trees Oil Company
- David Lytle Clark (1864–1939), businessman, creator of Clark Bar and Zagnut
- Henry Clay Frick (1849–1919), industrialist, founder of the South Fork Fishing and Hunting Club
- Henry J. Heinz (1844–1919), founder of H. J. Heinz Company
- H. J. "Jack" Heinz II (1908–1987), industrialist
- Henry Hillman (1918–2016), businessman, investor, civic leader, and philanthropist
- William Larimer Mellon Sr. (1868–1949), founder of Gulf Oil
- Willard Rockwell (1888–1978), founder of Rockwell International
- A.E. Succop (Augustus Ernest) (1847–1931), President Germania Savings Bank and German Fire Insurance Company
- Ernest T. Weir (1875–1957), founder of Weirton Steel and National Steel Corporation
- William Valentin Hartmann (1871–1947), VP of Gulf Oil

=== Political leaders ===
- Edward V. Babcock (1864–1948), Mayor of Pittsburgh 1918–22
- Matthew A. Dunn (1886–1942), member of the United States House of Representatives 1933–41
- William Flinn (1851–1924), politician
- Henry P. Ford (1837–1905), Mayor of Pittsburgh 1896–99
- H. John Heinz III (1938–1991), United States Senator 1977–91
- William McCallin (1842–1904), Mayor of Pittsburgh 1887–90
- John K. Tener (1863–1946), Governor of Pennsylvania 1911–1915
- Dick Thornburgh (1932-2020), United States attorney general 1988-1991
- William Wilkins (1779–1865), United States Senator from Pennsylvania 1831–34, Secretary of War 1844–45
- George Wilson (1816–1902), Mayor of Pittsburgh 1860–62

=== Military leaders ===
- John Wilkins Jr. (1761–1816), Quartermaster General of the United States Army 1796–1802

=== Artists and musicians ===
- Erroll Garner (1921–1977), jazz pianist and composer
- Walt Harper (1926–2006), jazz pianist
- Teenie Harris (1908–1998), photographer
- George Hetzel (1826–1899), portrait and landscape painter
- Churchill Kohlman (1906–1983), songwriter
- Anna Woodward (1868–1935), portrait and landscape painter
- Nikolai Lopatnikoff (1907-1976), composer
- Mac Miller (1992- 2018), rapper, songwriter, producer

=== Science and medicine ===
- Mary Bidwell Breed (1870–1949), chemist and first female dean of Indiana University
- Jared Cohon (1947–2024), engineer and president of Carnegie Mellon University
- Bertha Lamme Feicht (1869–1943), first female engineering graduate from Ohio State University and first female engineer to be employed by Westinghouse
- Bernard Fisher (1918–2019), pioneer of breast cancer treatment
- Childs Frick (1883–1965), paleontologist
- John Bell Hatcher (1861–1904), paleontologist
- Edwin Ruud (1854–1932), mechanical engineer and inventor
- Alvin P. Shapiro (1920–1998), physician and educator

=== Sports figures ===
- Bill Bishop (1869–1932), baseball player
- Chuck Cooper (1926–1984), first African-American to be drafted into the NBA
- Earl Francis (1935–2002), baseball player
- Bob Priddy (1939-2023), baseball player
- Jock Sutherland (1889–1948), football coach
- Pie Traynor (1899–1972), baseball Hall of Famer

=== Religion ===
- John Barrett Kerfoot (1816–1881), first Episcopal Bishop of Pittsburgh
- Robert S. Laws (c. 1837–1903), Baptist minister, educator, and church founder
- Stephen Varzaly (1890–1957), priest, journalist, and cultural activist

=== Others ===
- Edward Manning Bigelow (1850–1916), city planner
- Helen Clay Frick (1888–1984), philanthropist
- Rust Heinz (1914–1939), auto and boat designer
- Elsie Hillman (1925–2015), philanthropist and former Republican National Committeewoman
- Daisy Elizabeth Adams Lampkin (1883–1965), civil rights activist
- Perle Mesta (1889–1975), Ambassador to Luxembourg 1949–53, and a noted Washington, D.C. socialite during Eisenhower and Nixon eras
- Robert Lee Vann (1879–1940), publisher and editor of the Pittsburgh Courier
- Tom Boggs (1905–1952), poet
- Peter Oresick (1955-2016), poet
- John Sheridan Weller (1866-1944), attorney

== Gallery ==
Homewood Cemetery Gatehouse

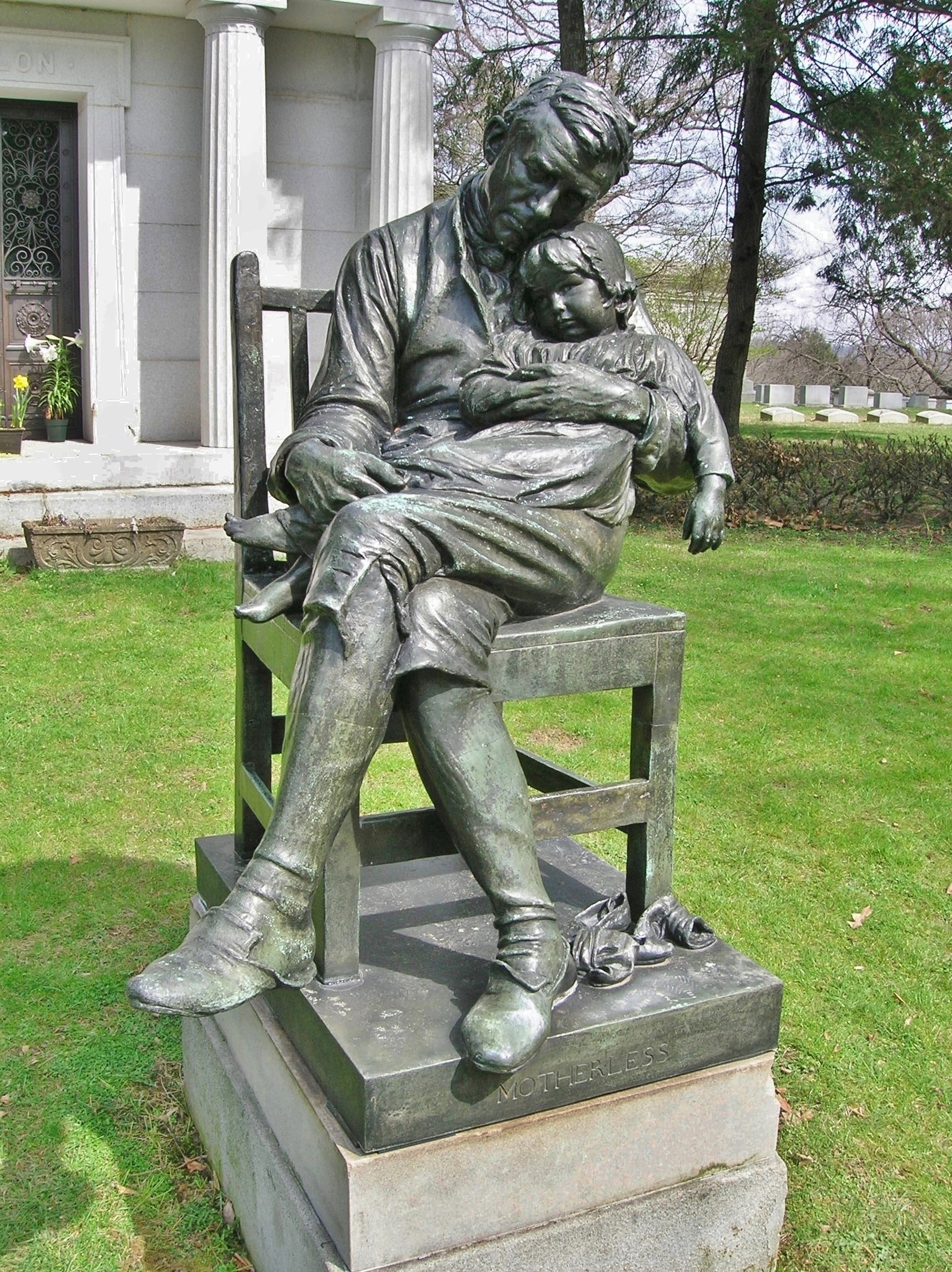
Motherless (1897), George Anderson Lawson, sculptor

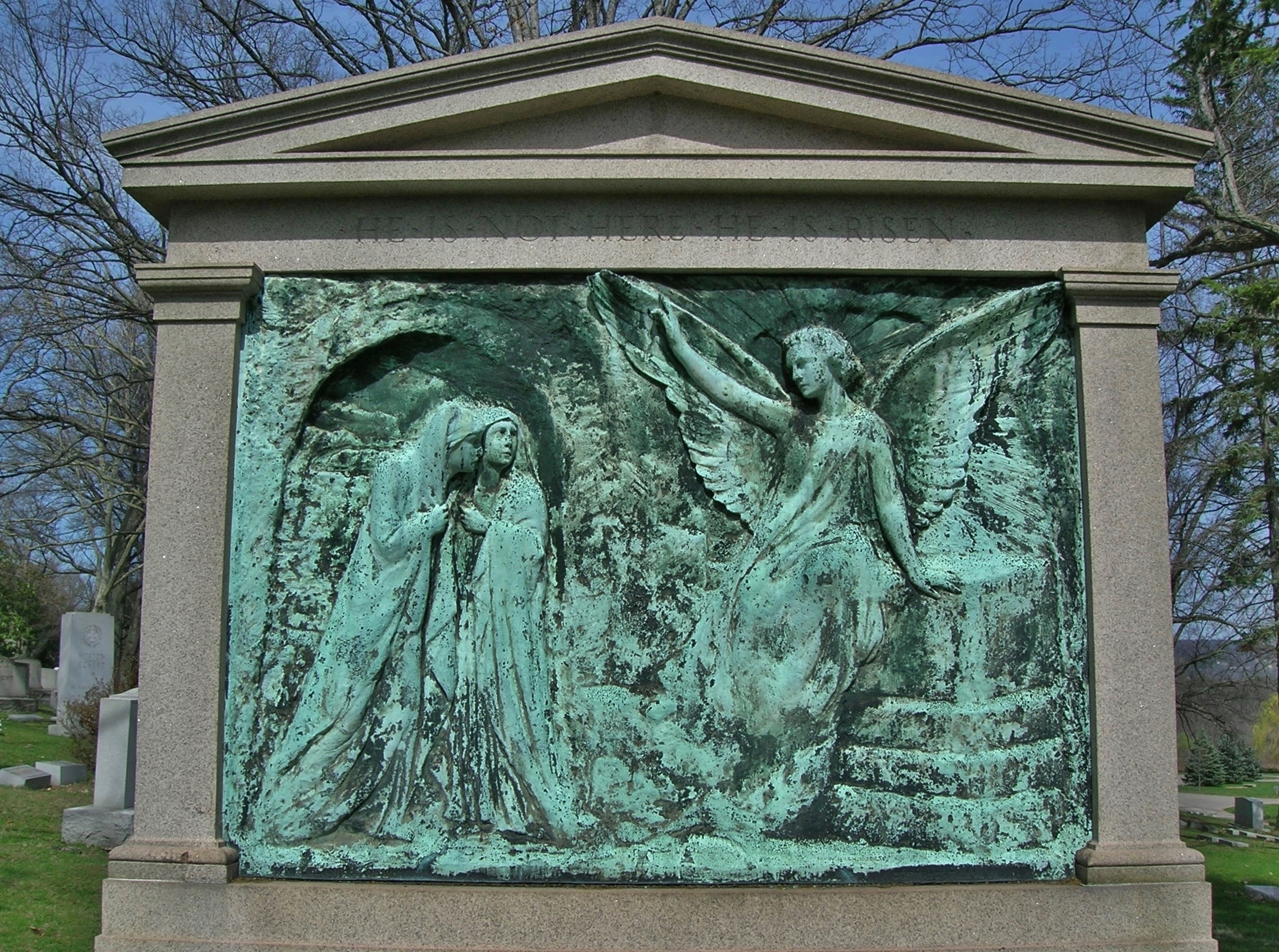
Bronze relief on Walker monument (ca. 1918–1921), Max Bachmann, sculptor

Elliott Mausoleum

Grave marker of Robert S. Laws

Landscape view

William Harry Brown Pyramid

== See also ==
- Allegheny Cemetery
- Greenwood Cemetery
- List of cemeteries in the United States
