= Mary Bidwell Breed =

American chemist

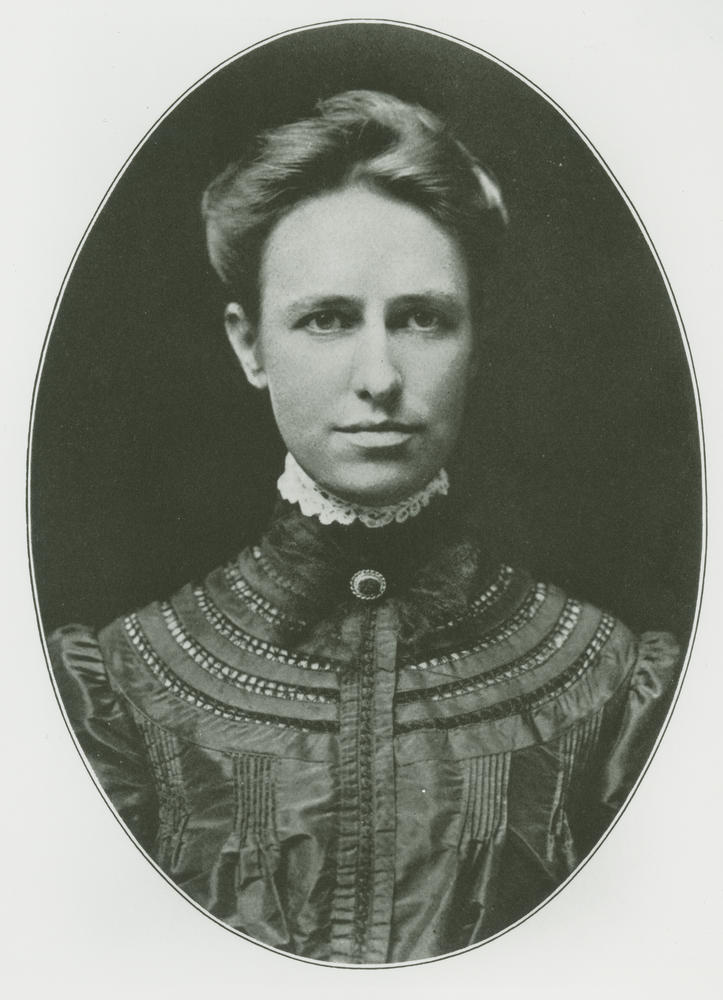
- Born: September 15, 1870; Pittsburgh, Pennsylvania, U.S.
- Died: September 15, 1949 (aged 79); Newton, New Jersey, U.S.
- Resting place: Homewood Cemetery, Pittsburgh, Pennsylvania, U.S.
- Education: Bryn Mawr College
- Occupation: Chemist

Mary Bidwell Breed (September 15, 1870 – September 15, 1949) was an American chemist. Her research focus was on aromatic acids and the atomic mass of palladium. In 1901 she became the first female dean of Indiana University.

== Biography ==
Mary Bidwell Breed was born on September 15, 1870, in Pittsburgh. She was educated at Bryn Mawr College, where she received three degrees and her PhD in 1901, and participated in the Bryn Mawr European Fellowship at Heidelberg University in 1895. She wrote The Polybasic Acids of Mesitylene, published in 1901, which discussed her chemistry work with aromatic acids, mainly derivatives of benzene.

Before finishing her doctorate, Breed was head of the science department at Pennsylvania College for Women. Her research focus was on aromatic acids and the atomic mass of palladium. Breed was the dean of women at Indiana University from 1901 to 1906, making her the first female dean at Indiana University. She used her position to denounce the segregation of men and women into certain academic fields. Breed was also a member of the teaching faculty of Indiana University as an assistant professor of chemistry. During Breed's term at Indiana University, the status of the position of dean of women began to decline. Many universities and colleges across the country reported that the women in these positions were not as accepted among the mostly male dominated faculty. Her work is not well documented after 1906; however, it is known that she was on faculty at the University of Missouri from 1906 to 1912, and served as director of the Margaret Morrison College of the Carnegie Institute of Technology, Pittsburgh from 1913 until at least 1926.

== Death ==
Breed died on her 79th birthday in 1949 in Newton, New Jersey. She is buried at Homewood Cemetery in Pittsburgh.
