= Financial World =

Defunct financial magazine

- Categories: Business
- Format: Biweekly magazine
- Founder: Louis Guenther
- Founded: 1902
- First issue: October 1, 1902; 123 years ago
- Final issue: 1998; 28 years ago
- Country: United States
- Based in: New York
- Language: English
- ISSN: 0015-2064

Financial World was an American magazine for investors that operated from 1902 to 1998. The magazine was known for its annual "Bronze Award" given to companies for the quality of their annual shareholders reports and, later, that year's top corporate CEO, in their respective industries.

== Publication history ==
Financial World was founded in 1902 by Louis Guenther in Chicago, and moved to New York City a few years later. The first issue, published on October 1, 1902, stated the purpose of the magazine was to provide information about companies that individual investors could use for evaluating the quality of individual stocks. The magazine was initially published monthly without advertisements for the price of 5¢ with subscriptions available for 50¢ per year. It started including advertisements when the publication frequency increased to semi-monthly commencing with the October 1, 1905, issue. Due to popular demand from its readers, the magazine began publishing weekly starting with the September 1, 1906, issue.

Guenther died on March 11, 1953, at the age of 78. Ralph Bach, Richard J. Anderson, and Arthur E. Voss purchased the magazine's publishing company, Guenther Publishing, from Guenther's estate in 1955. Bach, who had worked for the magazine since 1929, published it until his death in 1973, when Macro Communications took over. Macro reduced the publication frequency to semi-monthly in 1975. By the 1980s, the magazine was known for publishing annual lists of the year's top money-makers. Carl Lindner Jr. and a group of investors purchased the magazine in 1983; it was sold to Barry Rupp, Steve Rupp, and Timothy Draper in 1995.

In the magazine's later years of publication, its signature issue was the "Sports Franchise Valuation Issue". In its last years, this feature was prepared by Andrew Zimbalist, who became a contributor to Forbes.

The magazine failed in 1998.

== Bronze awards ==
=== Annual reports ===
In 1942, Vice President and Business Editor Weston Smith surveyed the shareholder annual reports for 1941 of 500 corporations listed on the New York Stock Exchange, evaluating how each company's report had improved the structure and quality of information presented when compared to the company's 1931 report. The following year, he expanded the survey to 766 corporations, both listed and unlisted, and awarded "Highest Merit Award" and "Honorable Mention" certificates for each industry category that were mailed to the presidents of the companies. The "Highest Merit Award" was for reports considered modern, while "Honorable Mention" was for reports that had shown significant improvement from 10 years before. The judging criteria included format, content and illustrations, typography, and public relations appeal. 318 were considered virtually unchanged, and Smith noted that some company reports had used the same style or content for over 25 years. Smith stated that the purpose of his annual report surveys was to foster continual improvement.

For the 1944 survey, over 2,000 companies submitted their 1943 annual reports to the magazine for inclusion. 1,000 reports qualified for the "Highest Merit Award" or an "Honorable Mention". In response to popular demand for selecting a best report from each industry category, the magazine formed an independent board of experts with initial members Lewis Haney (finance and economics), Norman Bel Geddes (industrial arts), Glenn Griswold (business and industry), Raymond C. Mayer (public relations), and C. Norman Stabler (financial journalism). The industry winners were announced in the August 9, 1944, issue, with Brown & Bigelow being awarded for "Outstanding Annual Report of the Year", and Pan American Airways being awarded "Best Original Annual Report Cover Design".

The first annual awards dinner was held on October 2, 1945, at the Waldorf-Astoria in New York City. The awards presented were the "best of industry" awards, which the magazine dubbed the "Oscar of Industry", a gold award for the overall winner (Caterpillar Tractor Company), second through fifth place awards, and two awards for cover designs.

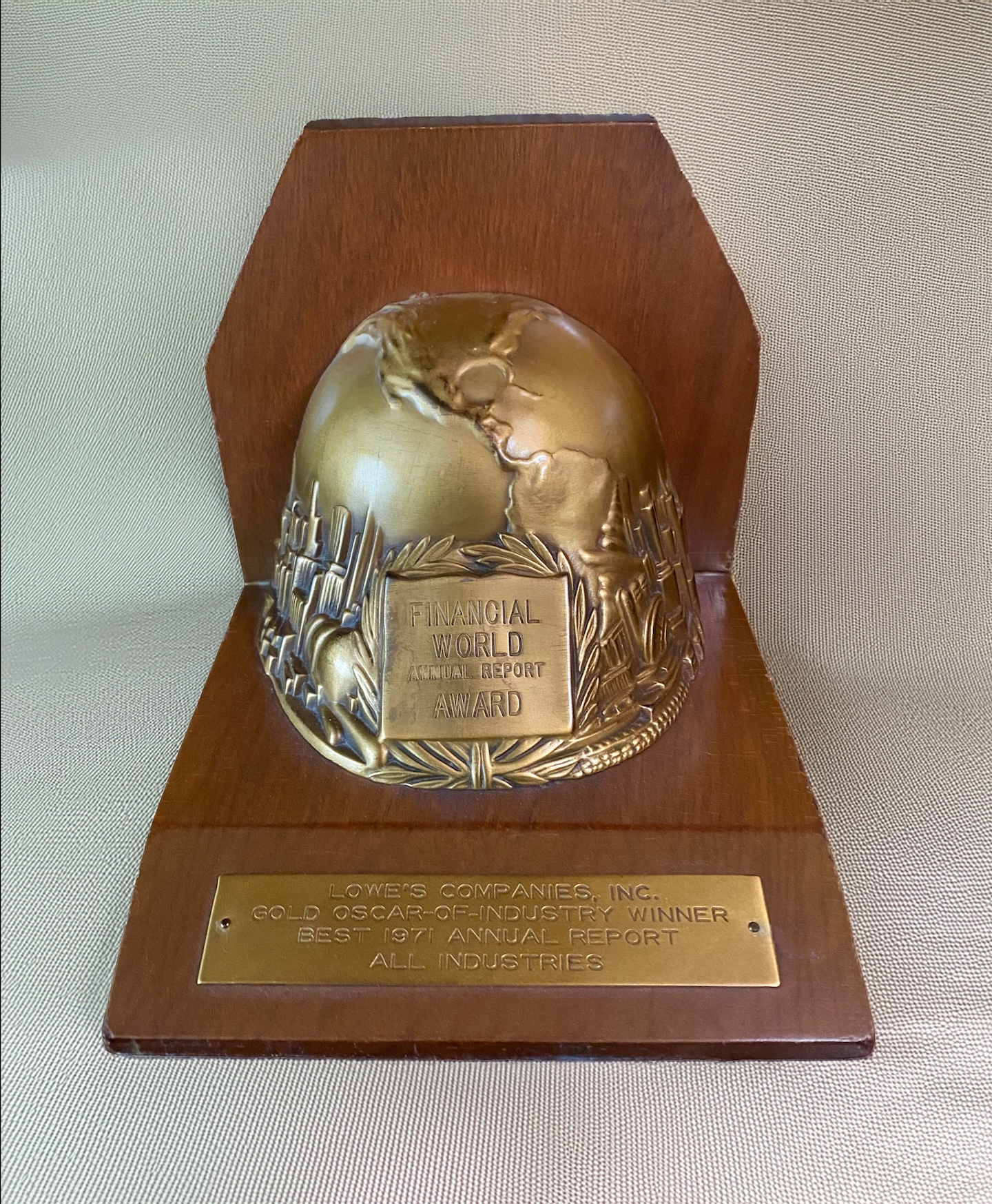
Financial World Gold Oscar of Industry Award Lowe's Companies 1971

Moving forward, the awards were divided into industrial classifications (100 in 1948), with the winner of each classification receiving a bronze award. The overall winner received a gold award, and multiple silver awards were given in various broader industry categorizations. Judging criteria included good design, graphics, completeness of information, and uniformity of data. Information looked for included the cost and nature of acquisitions, lines of business breakdowns, company products, sales, marketing and advertising, taxes, future financing plans, research and development, and public relations programs.

Annual Report Gold Winners
Year	Company
1945	Caterpillar Tractor Company
1946	Chesapeake and Ohio Railway
1947	Missouri–Kansas–Texas Railroad
1948	Marquette Cement Manufacturing Company
1949	Standard Oil Company
1950	General Motors
1951	Erie Railroad
1952	Monsanto Chemical Company
1953	Illinois Central Railroad
1954	Eastman Kodak
1955	Pennsylvania Railroad Company
1956	Great Northern Railway
1957	Marquette Cement Manufacturing Company
1958	Ford Motor Company
1959	Hilton Hotels Corporation
1960	Standard Accident Insurance Company
1961	American Electric Power Co.
1962	General Electric
1963	General Electric
1964	Xerox
1965	Copperweld Steel Company
1966	Eastman Kodak
1967	Glidden Company
1968	North American Rockwell Corporation
1969	Singer Corporation
1970	Westinghouse Electric Corp.
1971	Eastern Air Lines
1972	Lowe's Companies
1973	Philip Morris
1974	Citicorp
1975	Dayton-Hudson Corp.
1976	Lowe's Companies
1978	Louisiana Land and Exploration
1979	W. R. Grace and Company
1985	Vulcan Materials Company
1986	Lowe's Companies
1988	Times Mirror Company
1990	PepsiCo
1991	Atlantic Richfield Company
1992	PepsiCo
1994	Knight-Ridder
1995	Allstate Corp.

=== CEO of the year ===
The magazine began awarding its CEO of the Year award in 1975. Like the annual report awards, bronze awards were given for the best in each industry category (52 in 1983), silver awards, and a gold award for the overall winner.

CEO of the Year
Year	CEO	Company
1975	Walter B. Wriston	Citicorp
1976	C.B. Branch	Dow Chemical Company
	Rick de Lome	
	Mary Lynn Van Dyken	
	Jim Zahrt	
1982	Raymond Mundt	
1983	Lee Iacocca	Chrysler Corporation
1990	Amy Ink	
1993	Donald Haberek	
1994	Ronald L. Bittner	
1995	Ronald L. Bittner	
1996	Brian Engel	

=== Special awards ===
Special Awards
Year	Recipient	Reason
1960	New York Stock Exchange	The company's "leadership in encouraging greater dissemination of share ownership information."
1964	Commonwealth of Puerto Rico	"for distinguished achievement in the annual reports of the public corporations and authorities"

== Notable alumni of Financial World ==
- Stacey Bradford, financial journalist, author, and commentator
- Dan Cordtz, economics correspondent
- Dan Dorfman, television and print commentator and columnist
- Seth Hoyt, former publisher of Cosmopolitan Magazine
- Joseph Livingston, FW public utility editor in 1934
- Douglas McIntyre, technology entrepreneur
- Richard Sandomir, television, sports, and business reporter
- Anson Weston Smith, executive vice-president, creator of the shareholder annual report awards, and father of the famous radio DJ 'Wolfman Jack'
- John Hancock Willing Rhein, III, Sr. VP, Associate Publisher (1973–1982)
- Andrew Zimbalist, economist and author
