= Aryl-aldehyde dehydrogenase (NADP+) =

Enzyme family

aryl-aldehyde dehydrogenase (NADP+)

Identifiers
- EC no.: 1.2.1.30
- CAS no.: 9074-94-6

Databases
- BRENDA: enzyme data
- ExPASy: NiceZyme view
- KEGG: enzyme entry
- MetaCyc: metabolic pathway
- Rhea: reactions
- PDB structures: RCSB PDB PDBe PDBsum
- Gene Ontology: AmiGO / QuickGO
Search
- PMC: articles
- PubMed: articles
- NCBI: proteins

In enzymology, an aryl-aldehyde dehydrogenase (NADP+) (EC 1.2.1.30) is an enzyme that catalyzes the chemical reaction

an aromatic aldehyde + NADP^{+} + AMP + diphosphate + H_{2}O $\rightleftharpoons$ an aromatic acid + NADPH + H^{+} + ATP

The 5 substrates of this enzyme are aromatic aldehyde, NADP^{+}, AMP, diphosphate, and H_{2}O, whereas its 4 products are aromatic acid, NADPH, H^{+}, and ATP.

This enzyme belongs to the family of oxidoreductases, specifically those acting on the aldehyde or oxo group of donor with NAD+ or NADP+ as acceptor. The systematic name of this enzyme class is aryl-aldehyde:NADP+ oxidoreductase (ATP-forming). Other names in common use include aromatic acid reductase, and aryl-aldehyde dehydrogenase (NADP+).
