= Aryl-aldehyde dehydrogenase =

aryl-aldehyde dehydrogenase

Identifiers
- EC no.: 1.2.1.29
- CAS no.: 37250-94-5

Databases
- IntEnz: IntEnz view
- BRENDA: BRENDA entry
- ExPASy: NiceZyme view
- KEGG: KEGG entry
- MetaCyc: metabolic pathway
- PRIAM: profile
- PDB structures: RCSB PDB PDBe PDBsum
- Gene Ontology: AmiGO / QuickGO
Search
- PMC: articles
- PubMed: articles
- NCBI: proteins

In enzymology, an aryl-aldehyde dehydrogenase (EC 1.2.1.29) is an enzyme that catalyzes the chemical reaction

an aromatic aldehyde + NAD^{+} + H_{2}O $\rightleftharpoons$ an aromatic acid + NADH + H^{+}

The 3 substrates of this enzyme are aromatic aldehyde, NAD^{+}, and H_{2}O, whereas its 3 products are aromatic acid, NADH, and H^{+}.

This enzyme belongs to the family of oxidoreductases, specifically those acting on the aldehyde or oxo group of donor with NAD+ or NADP+ as acceptor. The systematic name of this enzyme class is aryl-aldehyde:NAD+ oxidoreductase. This enzyme participates in tyrosine metabolism and biphenyl degradation.
