= Elsie Hillman =

American politician & philanthropist (1925-2015)

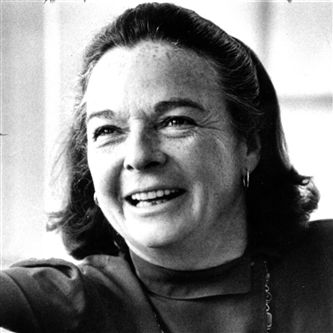

Member of the Republican National Committee from Pennsylvania
- In office 1975 – June 8, 1996
- Preceded by: Sally Stauffer
- Succeeded by: Anne Anstine

Personal details
- Born: Elsie Hilliard; December 9, 1925 Fox Chapel, Pennsylvania, US
- Died: August 4, 2015 (aged 89) Pittsburgh, Pennsylvania, US
- Resting place: Homewood Cemetery
- Party: Republican
- Spouse: Henry Hillman
- Children: Juliet Lea Hillman Simonds; Audrey Hillman Fisher; William Talbott Hillman; Henry L. Hillman Jr.
- Education: The Ellis School; Ethel Walker School; Westminster Choir College
- Known for: philanthropy

Elsie Hilliard Hillman (December 9, 1925 – August 4, 2015) was a Pittsburgh based philanthropist and a former Republican National Committeewoman. She was the wife of billionaire industrialist Henry Hillman. During her life, Hillman helped to advance the careers of a number of moderate Republican politicians to state and national offices. Among the politicians whose careers she fostered are President George H. W. Bush, Senator John Heinz, and Pennsylvania governors Dick Thornburgh and Tom Ridge.

She worked with Democrats and Republicans on civil rights, women’s rights, and jobs in the Pittsburgh region. Known for her down-to-earth nature and sense of humor, Pittsburghers regularly encountered "Elsie" in her signature headband, as she was active as a philanthropist and civic leader in the city and region.

== Early life ==
Hillman was born in Fox Chapel, Pennsylvania, a suburb of Pittsburgh, to Thomas Jones Hilliard and Marianna Talbott Hilliard. She was raised in the Fox Chapel and Hampton Township areas of Allegheny County before her family moved into the City of Pittsburgh. Hillman's mother served on the boards of non-profit organizations, volunteered to spot aircraft over Pittsburgh during WWII, and headed up the citywide effort to raise money to buy mobile kitchens and hospital equipment for war-bombed England. Elsie Hillman began her own volunteering by cleaning instruments for surgeries at Eye and Ear Hospital in Pittsburgh, selling War Bonds, and knitting socks for soldiers.

During her elementary and upper school years, Hillman attended the Ellis School in Pittsburgh and the Ethel Walker School in Connecticut. After she graduated from high school, Hillman went to Westminster Choir College in Princeton, N.J. to study piano and voice. (Her grandmother, Catherine Hauk Talbott, founded the college, which now is part of Rider University.) By then, she had fallen in love with Henry Hillman, a U.S. Navy pilot whom she had met years earlier in Pittsburgh. They were wed in 1945.

The Hillmans lived in New York and Texas, returning to the City of Pittsburgh at the end of the war.

== Political life ==
Hillman first ventured into politics as a young woman, campaigning for Republican presidential candidate Dwight D. Eisenhower because she saw him as a war hero. She had already registered as a Republican—both because of family tradition and the party’s support for women, including the Equal Rights Amendment (ERA) (which the party supported in its platform until 1980).

After Ike’s successful campaigns, Hillman remained involved in the Republican party during the 1960s as a volunteer at the local level. Her work in Pittsburgh and Allegheny County caused her to see how few African American men or women were involved in her party, so she arranged to meet with the county party chairman to raise the issue. He suggested that she meet Wendell Freeland, an African American lawyer and Tuskegee Airman, to team-up to recruit more volunteers and candidates from the city’s African American community.

Hillman and Freeland did this, going on to organize neighborhoods across the City of Pittsburgh and becoming lifelong friends through political and civic work that spanned decades.

Their work took Hillman into neighborhoods of Pittsburgh and the county she had never been. It was during this period that she developed her connections with African American leaders as well as a sense of outrage about the civil rights being denied to Black Americans. She volunteered for the board of directors of several traditionally African American organizations, including the Hill House Association, and began to speak publicly for civil rights.

Hillman and Freeland were able to reach African American voters in ways that the party had not before Never a Spectator and they organized large-scale events, including a 17,000-person rally for William Scranton when he ran for governor; Scranton was elected in 1962.

Because of Scranton’s moderate views and strong support of Civil Rights legislation, Hillman backed his candidacy during the 1964 Republican presidential primary in San Francisco (after having worked actively for Nelson Rockefeller, who withdrew from the race). She witnessed the poor treatment of African American Republican delegates by some of those who opposed Scranton. Scranton ultimately lost the nomination to Senator Barry Goldwater, who would go on to be defeated in the general election by Lyndon Johnson.

Hillman worked to elect Senator Hugh Scott, who had led the Republican National Committee and would rise to the position of Senate Minority Leader. With Scott’s encouragement, she ran for the position of chair of the Allegheny County Republican Party and was elected to the job in 1967—the first woman elected to head the party of an urban area. It was during her time as party chair that she worked to field winning candidates and develop connections with her counterparts across the state of Pennsylvania, including the members of the Republican State Committee of Pennsylvania.

During and after her tenure as party chair, Hillman worked to advance moderate candidates who supported civil rights and women’s rights—urging them to run, helping them to organize their campaigns (often staffing them, as a volunteer), and connecting them with the leaders of organized labor and other influential groups. She and her family made extensive contributions to campaigns as well, eventually establishing a political action committee to support moderate candidates. She was also known as a supporter of abortion rights.

In 1975, the State Committee of Pennsylvania elected Hillman to the Republican National Committee (RNC). She served as a national committeewoman until 1996.

She work on George H. W. Bush's 1980 campaign and helped him win the Pennsylvania primary. Ronald Reagan won the party nomination, but Bush was his vice-presidential running mate.

She was honored as "Woman of the Year" for 1982 by Vectors/Pittsburgh. In 2002, she was named to the PoliticsPA list of "Sy Snyder's Power 50." In 2003, she was named to the PoliticsPA "Power 50" list. She was named to the PoliticsPA list of "Pennsylvania's Most Politically Powerful Women." In 2010, Politics Magazine named her one of the most influential Republicans in Pennsylvania, calling her the "grand dame of big tent Republican politics."

== Philanthropy ==
She was chair of the Elsie H. Hillman Foundation, a trustee of the Hillman Family Foundations, co-chair of the UPCI and UPMC CancerCenter Council, and served as a board member of WQED, the Pittsburgh Symphony Orchestra, Hill House Association

== Personal life ==
Hillman died of heart failure on August 4, 2015, at the University of Pittsburgh Medical Center. Among the numerous political, civic, business, and medical leaders who attended her memorial service at Calvary Episcopal Church were former Pennsylvania governors Tom Corbett, Tom Ridge, and Dick Thornburgh. Burial was at Homewood Cemetery in Pittsburgh.

== Elsie H. Hillman Papers ==
University of Pittsburgh received Hillman's personal papers in 2013. They are stored and made accessible Archives Service Center of the University of Pittsburgh’s Library System. This collection amounts to over a hundred boxes. The papers are divided into fourteen sections:

- Series I. Republican Party Activity
- Series II. Political Campaigns
- Series III. Other Political Activity
- Series IV. Community Involvement
- Series V. Speeches and Writings
- Series VI. Awards contains material and records
- Series VII. Subject Files
- Series VIII. National Awareness documents, the Blair House Restoration Foundation and the White House Endowment Fund.
- Series IX. General Correspondence contains letters written to and from Elsie Hillman.
- Series X. Personal (Friends and Family) documents Elsie’s own personal life, as well as those of her friends and family members.
- Series XI. Public Profiles contains articles and newspaper clippings
- Series XII. Photographs contains many photographs
- Series XIII. Political memorabilia, campaign buttons, and other objects.
- Series XIV. Audio-Video of interviews, news programs, and live events

== See also ==
- Hillman Library – named for the Hillman family
