= Hillman Hall of Minerals and Gems =

Mineral and gem collection of the Carnegie Museum of Natural History

Coordinates: 40.44364°N 79.95111°W

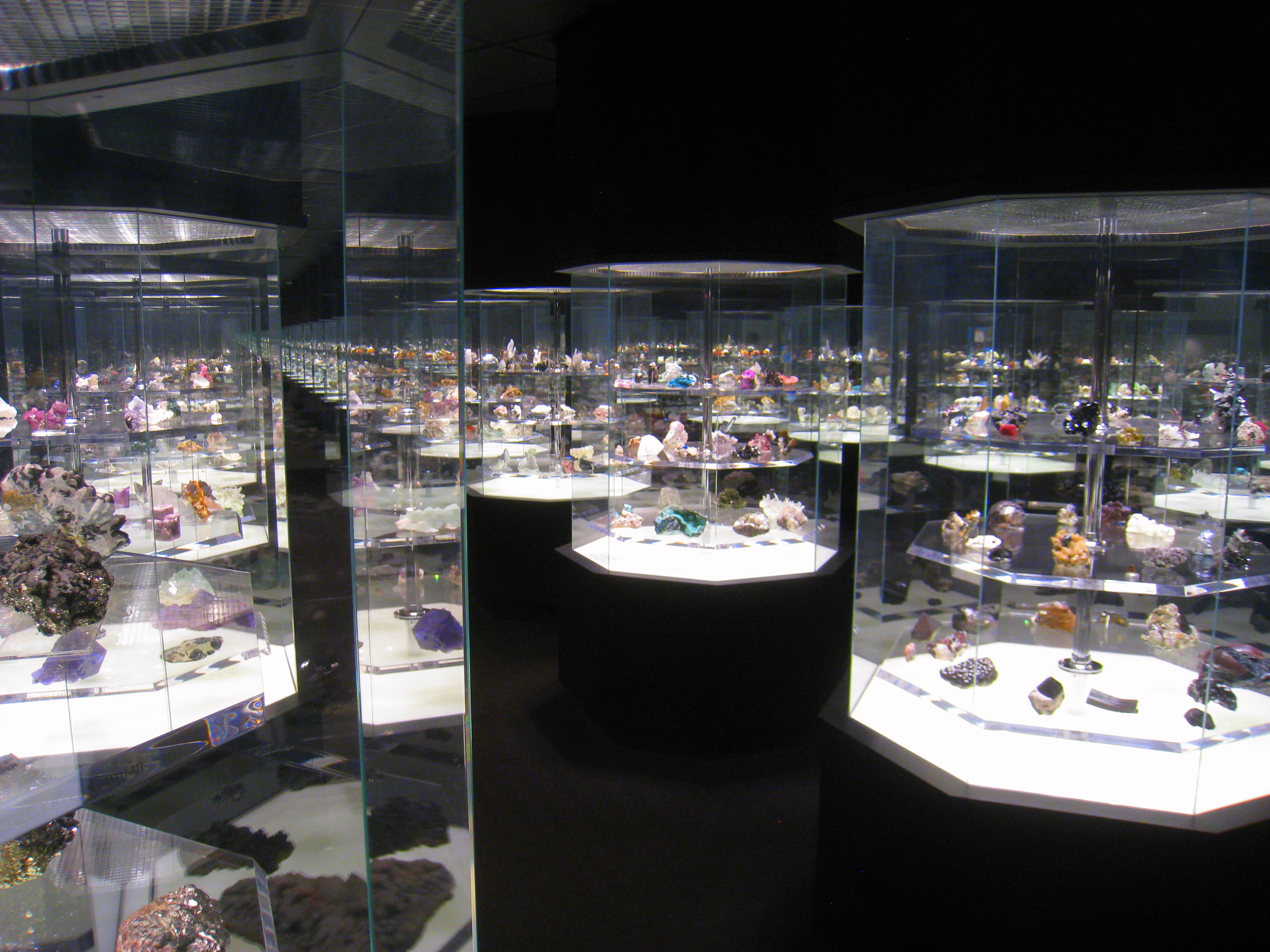
Hillman Hall of Minerals and Gems

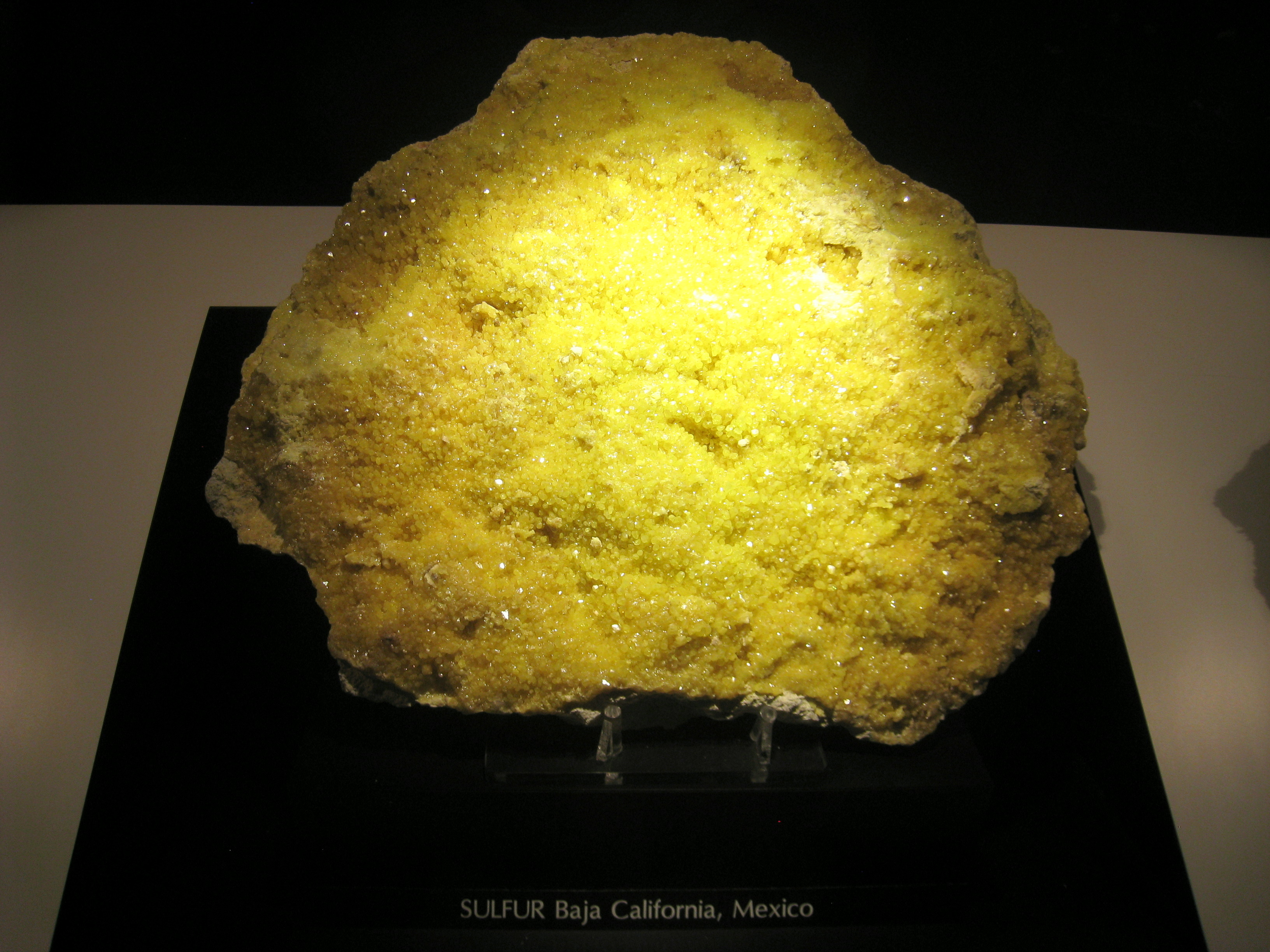
Native sulfur, Baja California

The Hillman Hall of Minerals and Gems is a notable mineral and gem collection within the Carnegie Museum of Natural History in Pittsburgh, Pennsylvania. Comprising over 1,300 specimens, Hillman Hall has gained a reputation as one of the finest mineral exhibitions in the United States

== History ==
The museum's first mineralogy exhibit consisted of about 550 specimens loaned by Professor Gustave Guttenberg, then purchased after his death in 1896 to become the core of the museum's collection. In subsequent decades, it was augmented primarily by gifts, including Andrew Carnegie's 1904 donation of the notable mineral collection of William W. Jefferis of West Chester, Pennsylvania (about 12,000 specimens), and a donation in 1902 of 2,600 gems from John L. Lewis, President of the Lewis Foundry & Machine Company located in Groveton, Pennsylvania. The museum also acquired ores and metals representing Pittsburgh industries, including tin, lead, copper, antimony, and bismuth, as well as local steel products, oil-bearing rock, crude petroleum, coal, coke, and graphite. Starting in 1969, trustee Henry L. Hillman provided substantial donations for purchasing new specimens and building the current exhibit hall, which opened in 1980, and was expanded and remodeled from 2006-2007.

== Collections ==
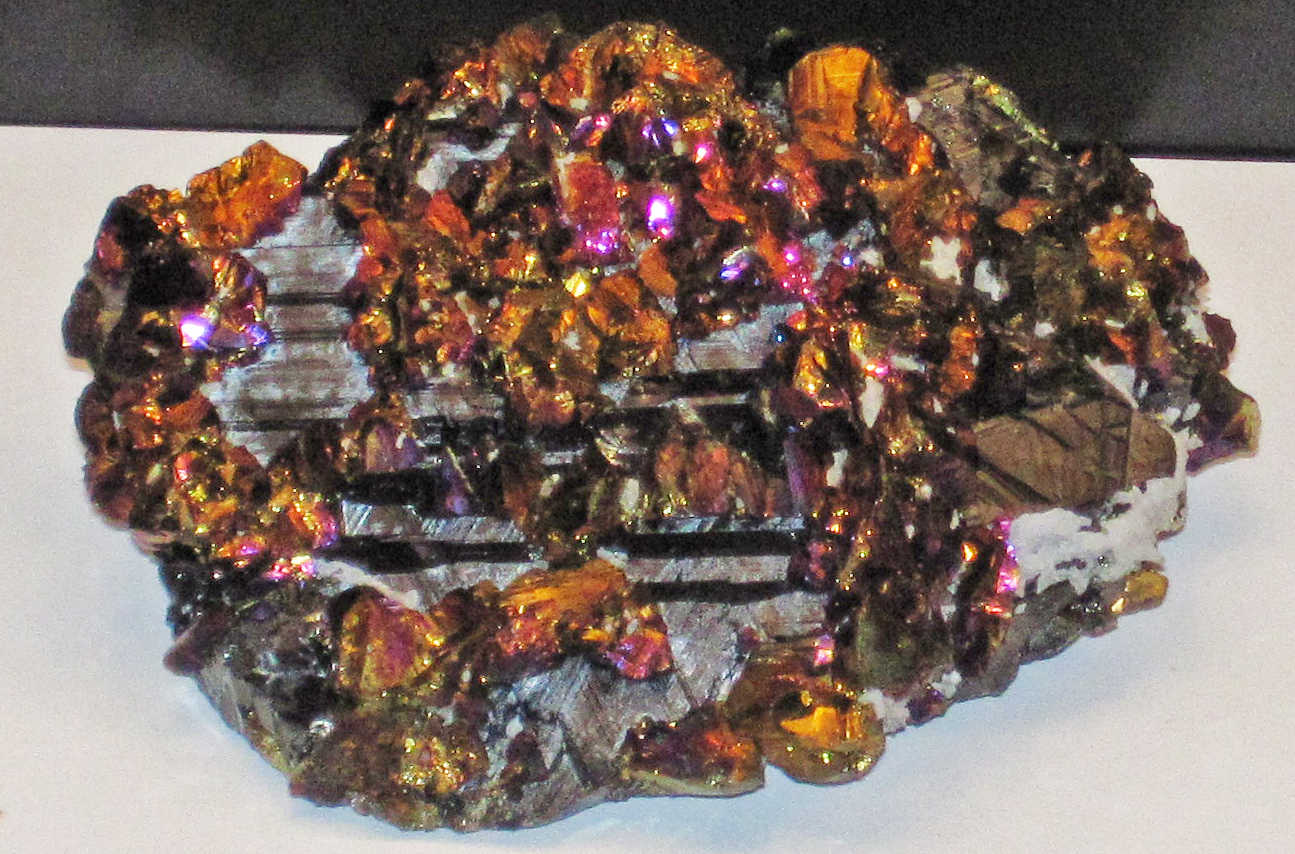
Chalcopyrite on sphalerite (Bolut Mine, Cavnic, Romania)

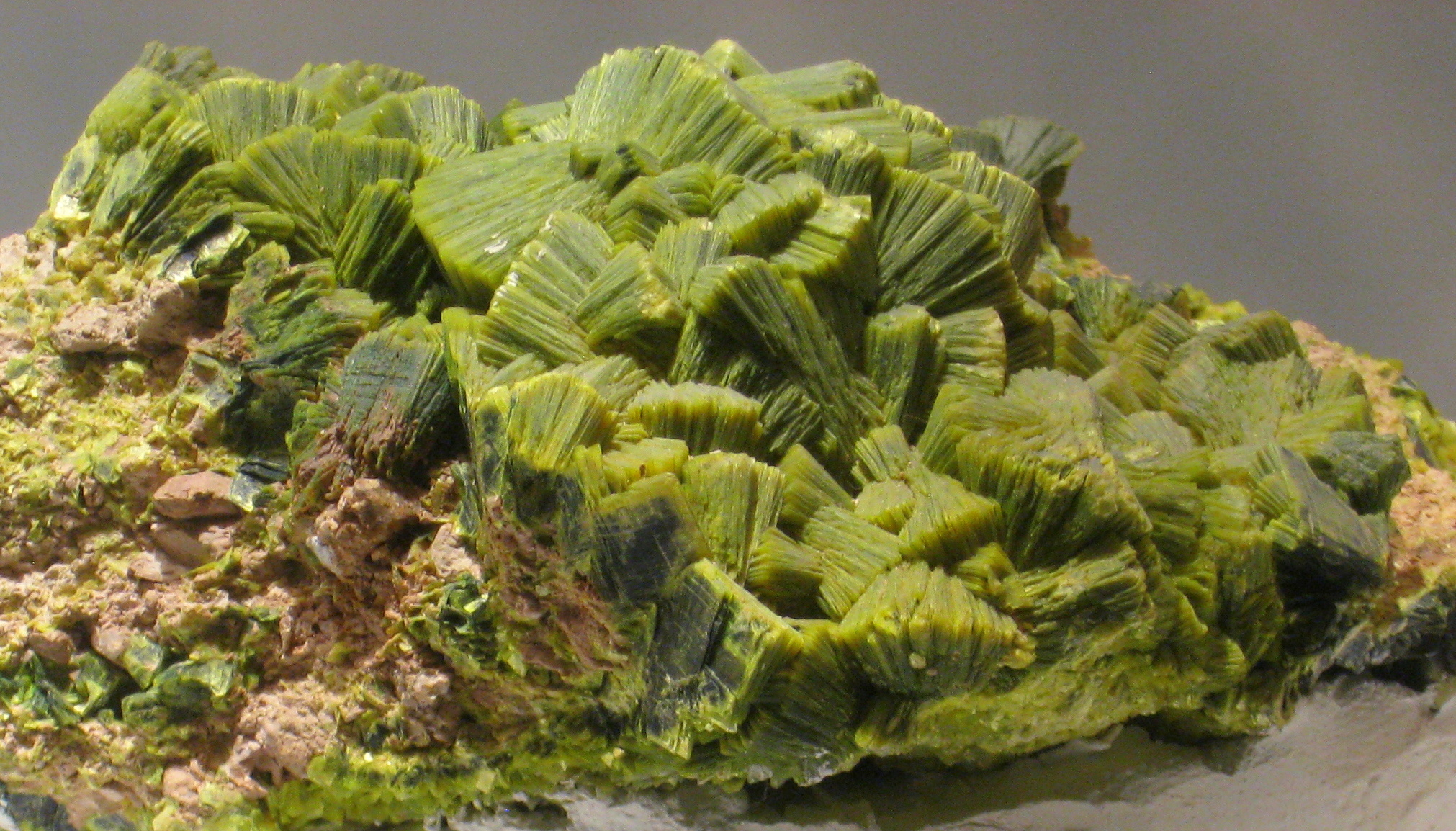
Autunite, Washington state

Hillman Hall contains more than 1,300 specimens, a curated sample of the Section Minerals collection of more than 30,000 specimens. The Hall is arranged in the following major sections:

- Lithology and Processes - illustrates the processes that create and transform rocks and minerals.
- Crystallography - exhibits that explain crystals and crystallography.
- Mineral Properties - physical properties of a variety of minerals.
- Fluorescence and Phosphorescence - displays of mineral fluorescence and phosphorescence.
- Locality Suites - illustrates the diversity of mineral species that come from a single geographic environment and how they impacted civilizations.
- Pennsylvania Minerals and Gems - specimens representing some of the finest minerals and gems from Pennsylvania.
- Systematic Collection - exhibiting minerals in systematic groupings by chemical classification according to Dana's System of Mineralogy.
- Masterpiece Gallery - an esthetic collection of notable mineral specimens from around the world.
- Wertz Gallery - the museum's gem collection, containing 17 permanent exhibits that display nearly 530 pieces, including a Birthstones exhibit.
