= Prenylated flavin mononucleotide =

Names
- IUPAC name 1-Deoxy-1-(3,3,4,5-tetramethyl-9,11-dioxo-2,3,8,9,10,11-hexahydro-1H,7H-quinolino[1,8-fg]pteridin-7-yl)-D-ribitol 5-(dihydrogen phosphate)
- Systematic IUPAC name (2R,3S,4S)-2,3,4-Trihydroxy-5-(3,3,4,5-tetramethyl-9,11-dioxo-2,3,8,9,10,11-hexahydro-1H,7H-quinolino[1,8-fg]pteridin-7-yl)pentyl dihydrogen phosphate
- Other names prFMN; Prenylated FMNH2

Identifiers
3D model (JSmol)	Interactive image
ChemSpider	61709288
KEGG	C21215
PubChem CID	91801161
- InChI: InChI=1S/C22H31N4O9P/c1-10-7-12-16-15(11(10)2)22(3,4)5-6-25(16)17-19(23-21(31)24-20(17)30)26(12)8-13(27)18(29)14(28)9-35-36(32,33)34/h7,13-14,18,27-29H,5-6,8-9H2,1-4H3,(H2,32,33,34)(H2,23,24,30,31)/t13-,14+,18-/m0/s1 Key: GLNFBGKHGHVPRL-IYOUNJFTSA-N
- SMILES: CC1=CC2=C3C(=C1C)C(CCN3C4=C(N2C[C@@H]([C@@H]([C@@H](COP(=O)(O)O)O)O)O)NC(=O)NC4=O)(C)C

Properties
Chemical formula	C_{22}H_{31}N_{4}O_{9}P
Molar mass	526.483 g·mol^{−1}
- Except where otherwise noted, data are given for materials in their standard state (at 25 °C [77 °F], 100 kPa). Infobox references

Prenylated flavin mononucleotide (prFMN) is a cofactor biosynthesized by the flavin prenyltransferase UbiX and used by UbiD enzymes for reversible decarboxylation reactions. Hence, prFMN is pivotal for catalysis in the ubiquitous microbial UbiD/X system.

prFMN is flavin prenylated at the N5 and C6 positions resulting in the formation of a fourth non-aromatic ring.

prFMN was discovered in 2015 at the University of Manchester by David Leys' group.

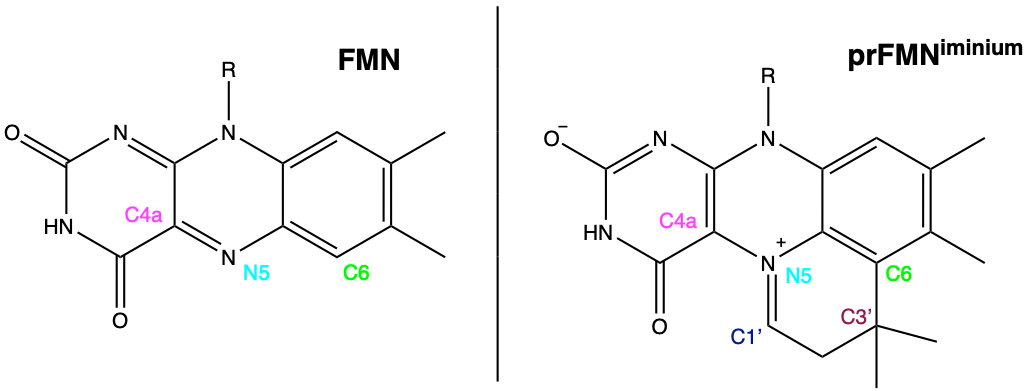
Structure of FMN and prFMN^{iminium}. The leftmost structure shows FMN (Flavin mononucleotide), the rightmost structure shows prFMN^{iminium} (prenylated flavin mononucleotide), Note the presence of the quaternary carbon (C3’) in prFMN^{iminium} indicative of cofactor prenylation.

Two studies in 2015 characterized UbiX as a flavin prenyltransferase, supplying prFMN to UbiD/Fdc1 which utilises the cofactor to catalyse a reversible decarboxylation reaction. Ferulic acid decarboxylase (Fdc1) from A. niger co-expressed in E. coli with UbiX from E. coli (AnFdc1^{UbiX}) once purified had clear spectral differences to singly expressed AnFdc1, and was capable of in vitro decarboxylation of a range of aromatic carboxylic acids. The atomic resolution of the crystal structure of AnFdc1^{UbiX}, allowed elucidation of the structure of the modified FMN cofactor classified as prFMN. The crystal structure revealed an isopentenyl-adduct to the N5-C6 of FMN, with the modifications branched nature and the position of the covalent linkages with flavin suggesting prenylation.

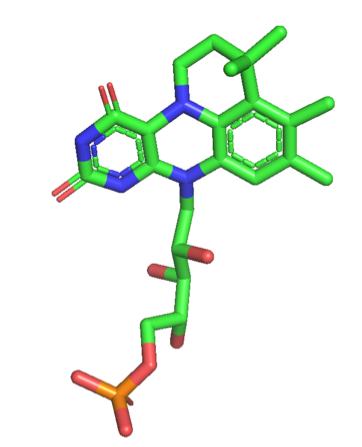
prFMN^{iminium} in the active site of AnFDC1. PDB file: 4ZA4.

== PrFMN^{Ox} ==
UbiD activation by UbiX/prFMN was found to be dependent on oxygen suggesting that the reduced prFMN product of UbiX is oxidised to the catalytically relevant form. Several variations of the oxidised prFMN (prFMN^{ox}) cofactor were observed: prFMN^{iminium}, hydroxylated prFMN^{iminium} and prFMN^{ketimine}. Determination of the prFMN isomer that was catalytically relevant involved incubation of AnFdc1^{UbiX} with phenylpyruvate (of which a small proportion is α-hydroxycinnamic acid which closely resembles cinnamic acid - a model substrate). Incubation with phenylpyruvate lead to an altered UV-Vis spectrum and reversible enzyme inhibition. The crystal structure of AnFdc1^{UbiX} with phenylpyruvate revealed a bond between C1’ of prFMN^{iminium} and a phenylacetaldehyde adduct – a species that can be formed by decarboxylation of α-hydroxycinnamic acid and tautomerization of the α-hydroxystyrene prFMN^{iminium} adduct.

This observation confirmed that it is the prFMN^{iminium} that is the catalytically relevant cofactor.
