= Stacey Bradford =

American journalist

Stacey Bradford is an American financial journalist, author, and commentator. She is the author of The Wall Street Journal Financial Guidebook for New Parents, and writes the Family Finance blog on CBS MoneyWatch.com. Previously, Stacey was an associate editor at SmartMoney.com.

== Early life and education ==
Born and raised in Montville, New Jersey, Bradford holds a BA from the University of Southern California, and MA in journalism from New York University.

== Career ==
Bradford began her journalism career at Financial World, before moving to the Dow Jones/Hearst start-up SmartMoney.com in 1997, rising to associate editor in 1998. After 11 years at SmartMoney.com covering investing and personal finance issues, Bradford joined the CBS start-up MoneyWatch.com in 2009.

Bradford's articles have appeared in The Wall Street Journal's Sunday Journal, RealEstateJournal.com, and CareerJournal.com, as well as Consumer Reports, AOL and Yahoo! Finance. She has appeared on CNN Headline News, Fox News, CNBC, CBS, The Wall Street Journal Radio Network and CBS Radio.

== Personal life ==
Stacey lives in New York City with her husband and daughter.

== Published works ==
- The Wall Street Journal Financial Guidebook for New Parents (June 2009)

== Awards and recognition ==
- 2008, The Society of American Business Editors and Writers Best in Journalism Award (Category: Audio/Visual Report for a Mid-Sized Website)
- 2000, ICI Education Foundation / American University Journalism Award for Excellence in Personal Finance Reporting
