= Dan Cordtz =

American journalist (1927–2019)

Dan Cordtz (May 1, 1927 – May 4, 2019) was an American economics correspondent for ABC News from 1974 to 1989. He also worked for The Wall Street Journal and Financial World.

Cordtz died from cancer in Albuquerque, New Mexico, on May 4, 2019, at the age of 92.
