= Ferulic acid decarboxylase =

Decarboxylase enzymes

AnFDC1
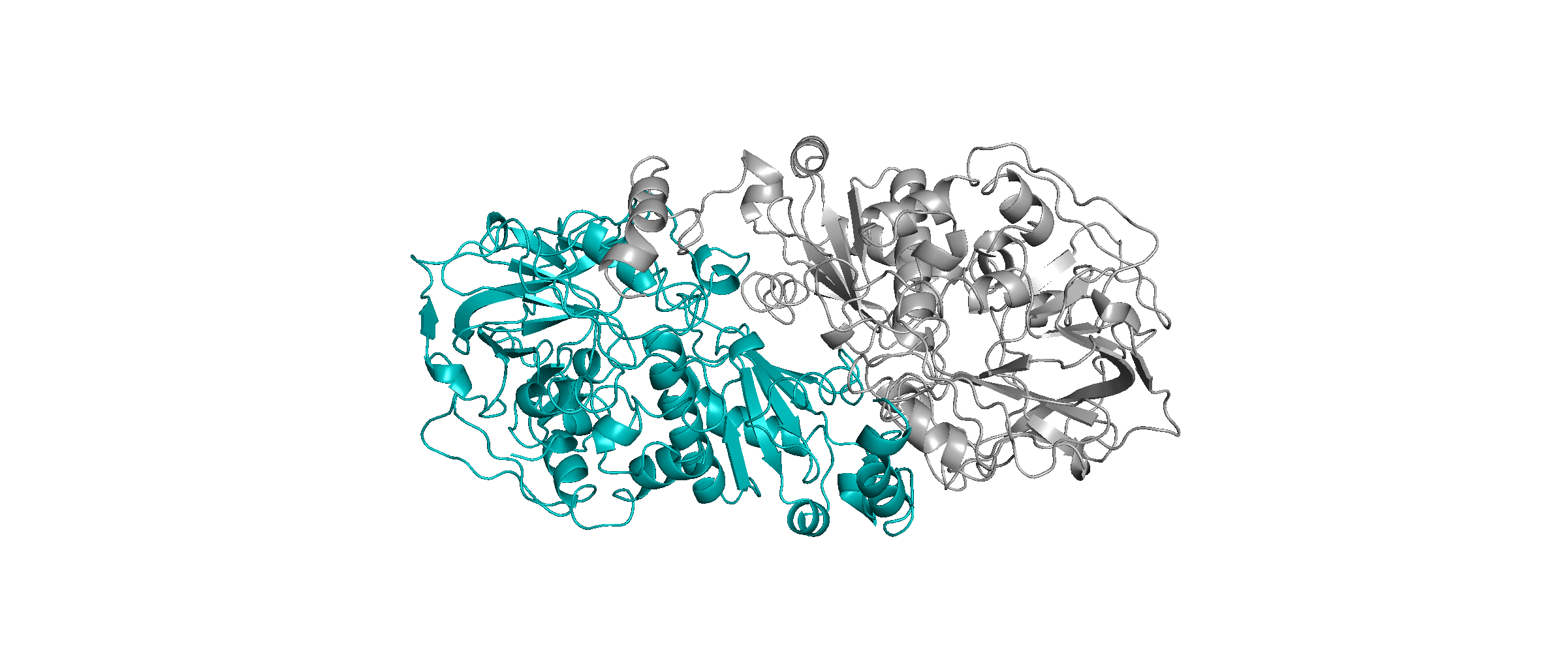
- Dimer of Fdc1 from Aspergillus niger. PDB file : 4ZA4

Identifiers
- EC no.: 4.1.1.102

Databases
- IntEnz: IntEnz view
- BRENDA: BRENDA entry
- ExPASy: NiceZyme view
- KEGG: KEGG entry
- MetaCyc: metabolic pathway
- PRIAM: profile
- PDB structures: RCSB PDB PDBe PDBsum
Search
- PMC: articles
- PubMed: articles
- NCBI: proteins

Ferulic acid decarboxylases (Fdc) are decarboxylase enzymes capable of the reversible decarboxylation of aromatic carboxylic acids such as ferulic acid and cinnamic acid. Fdc's are fungal homologues of the E. coli UbiD enzyme which is involved in ubiquinone biosynthesis. This places Fdc within the wider UbiD enzyme family, representing a distinct clade within the family Presence of fdc1 and the associated pad1 genes (Pad1 homologous to UbiX in E. coli) were shown to be required for the decarboxylation of phenylacrylic acids in Saccharomyces cerevisiae.

In 2015 the cofactor prFMN was discovered in the active site of Fdc1 from Aspergillus niger (AnFdc) by crystallography, prior to this genetic studies had led to the assumption that both UbiD and UbiX encoded isofunctional decarboxylases. In actuality UbiX/Pad were found to be flavin prenyltransferases supplying the prFMN cofactor to UbiD/Fdc where it is utilised for the reversible decarboxylation of alpha-beta unsaturated carboxylic acid substrates. Since the discovery of prFMN AnFDC has become the most well understood representative of the UbiD enzyme family

== AnFDC Mechanism ==
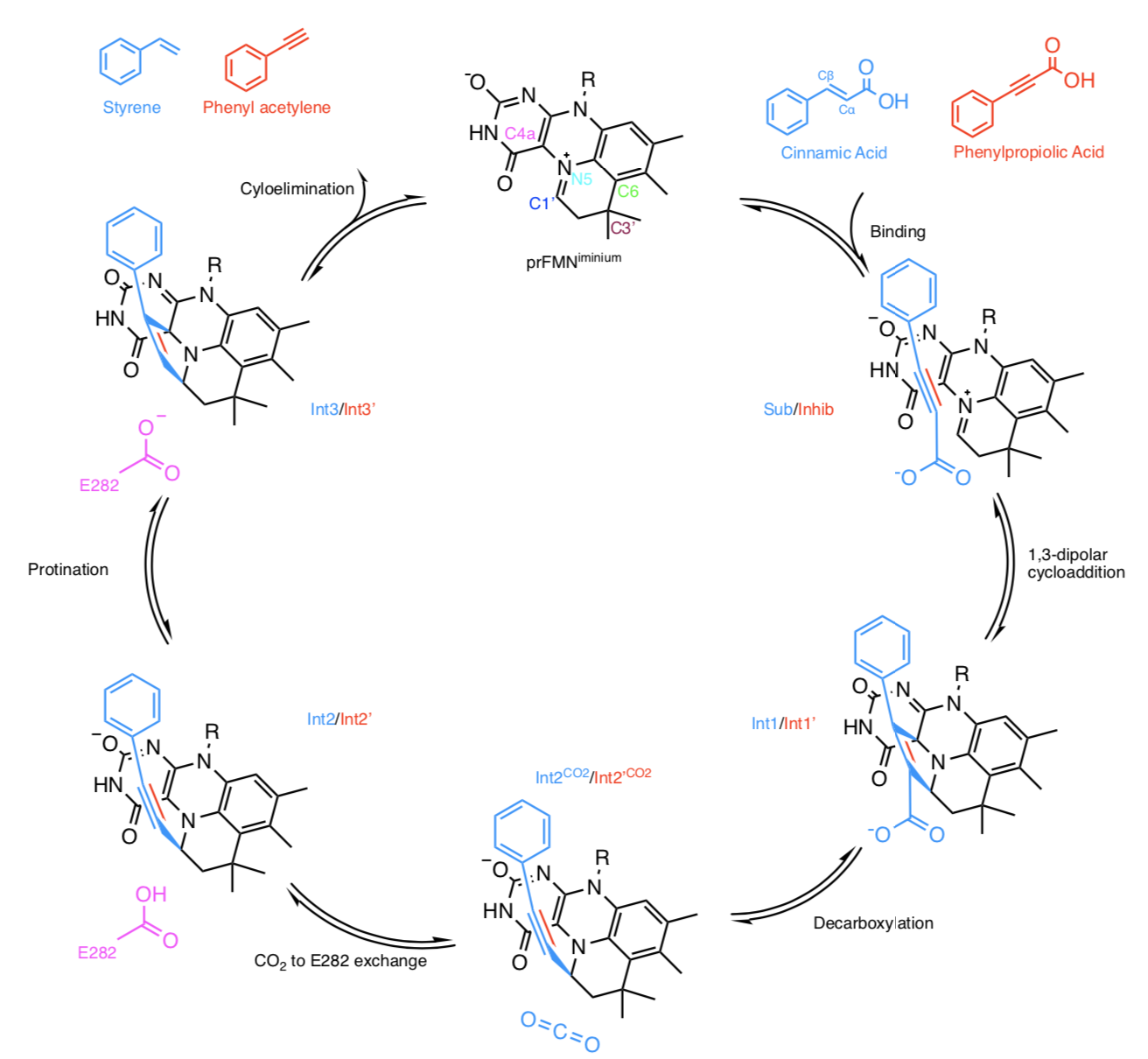
Figure 1. Proposed mechanism for AnFDC.

In the same paper in which the structure of prFMN was deduced in the active site of AnFdc1 there was a proposal for the mechanism by which Fdc1 decarboxylates α,β-unsaturated carboxylic acids. Not all UbiD enzymes decarboxylate acrylic acid substrates and other mechanisms may be at play for alternative substrates. In the case of AnFdc1 it was noted that prFMN displays an azomethine ylide characteristic C4a-N5+=C1’(Figure 1). This is a well-known 1,3-dipole in organic chemistry, positioned in the enzyme active site near to the α,β-unsaturated carboxylic acid substrate which contains a 1,3-dipolarophile. Thus, it was proposed that a 1,3-dipolar cycloaddition mechanism was responsible for the enzymatic decarboxylation. This was confirmed in a later paper.

The mechanism proposed in for 1,3-dipolar cycloaddition by Fdc1 is as follows (intermediates represented in Figure 1):

1. 1,3-dipolar cycloaddition between prFMN^{iminium} and the α,β-unsaturated substrate leads to a pyrrolidine cycloadduct (Int1)
2. This pyrrolidine cycloadduct supports simultaneous decarboxylation and ring opening, resulting in the formation of a distinct prFMN-alkene adduct (Int2)
3. A conserved glutamic acid residue (E282) donates a proton to the alkene moiety, resulting a second pyrrolidine cycloadduct (Int3)
4. The reaction concludes with cycloelimination of Int3 and the release of the alkene product and CO_{2}

A study went on to present evidence for the 1,3-dipolar cycloaddition, due to suspected turnover of cinnamic acid a crystal structure of AnFdc1 in complex with α-fluorocinnamic acid revealed the substrate Cα and Cβ carbons are located directly above the prFMN^{iminium} C1’ and C4a respectively (shown as Sub in Figure 1 - with cinnamic acid as opposed to α-fluorocinnamic acid). Cinnamic acid was confirmed to bind in a similar manner using inactive AnFdc1 crystals containing FMN. The AnFdc1 E282Q mutant crystallised with cinnamic acid revealed a structure corresponding to the Int2 species, this was taken to mean that progression through the 1,3-dipolarcycloadition cycle was halted as E282 is unable to donate a proton to the alkene moiety.

In order to observe the Int1 and Int3 structures alkyne analogues were used. Like alkenes these compounds can also act as dipolarophiles but cycloaddition would yield a cycloadduct containing a double bond. An inactive AnFdc1 enzyme (with prFMN^{radical} bound) co-crystallised with the phenylpropiolic acid revealed binding in a similar manner to the α-fluorocinnamic acid AnFdc1 and cinnamic acid AnFdc1 with FMN bound (Inhib). An active AnFdc1 enzyme co-crystallised with phenylpropiolic acid revealed clear density for a 3-pyrroline cycloadduct (Int3’) between the alkyne and prFMN^{iminium}. Int3’ represents a structure post decarboxylation, so it was assumed that over the time it took for crystallisation (~24h) the decarboxylation had occurred. Using a rapid soaking procedure, a different cycloadduct was observed that retained the carboxyl moiety (Int1’).
