= Anna Woodward =

American painter

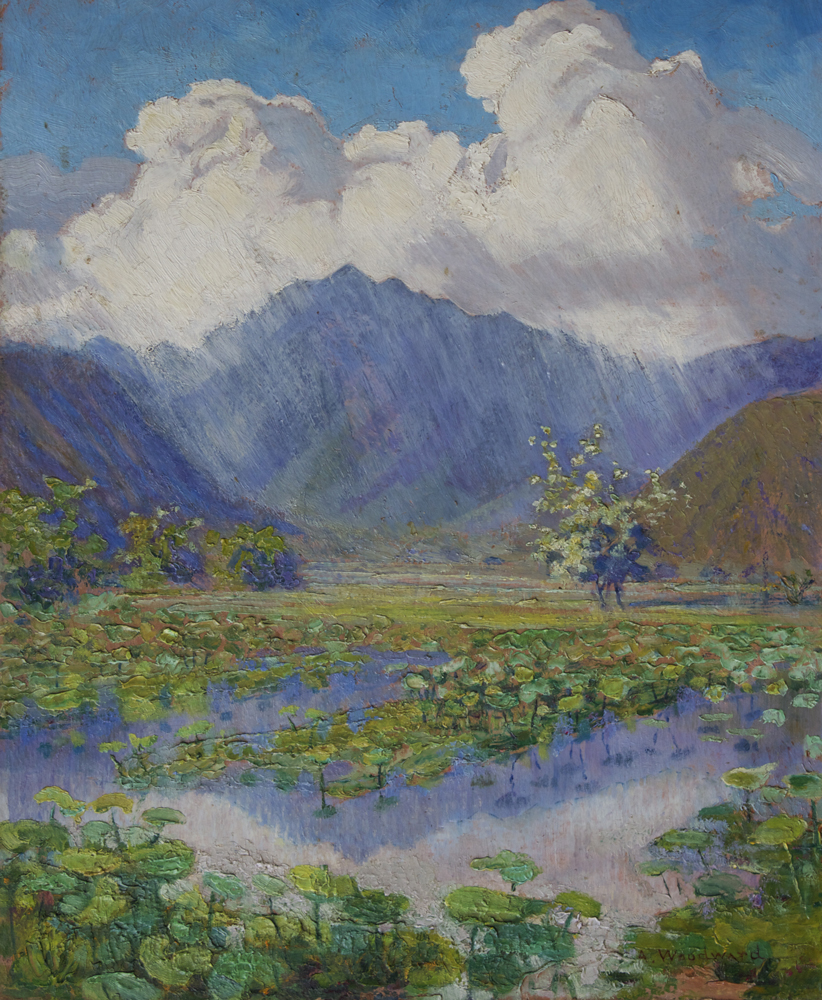
A Shower in the Mountains, Manoa Valley by Anna Woodward

Anna Woodward (1868–1935) was an American painter who was born in Pittsburgh, Pennsylvania in 1868. She studied painting at the Académie Julian in Paris with Tony Robert-Fleury, Jules Joseph Lefebvre, and William-Adolphe Bouguereau, and also with George Hitchcock in Holland. By 1918, she moved to Hawaii from Paris with a studio near Waikiki. She was influenced by the impressionist movement, creating landscape portraits. During the 1920s and 1930s she produced illustrations and paintings for Paradise of the Pacific. Woodward died in Honolulu in 1935.

The University of Iowa Museum of Art is among the public collections that hold works by Anna Woodward.

== Biography ==
Anna Woodward was born in Pittsburgh, Pennsylvania, on January 26, 1868. She was born to Anna M. W. Steiner and Marcus A. Woodward; a wealthy and well-known lawyer in Pittsburgh. She spent her childhood in Pennsylvania, earning a bachelor's degree. Soon after, Woodward went to Paris with the accompaniment of her mother and enrolled at the Académie Julian, with a focus in oil painting. She studied painting under the instruction of Jules-Joseph LeFebvre, Tony Robert-Fleury, and William Bourguereau. During the summer, she attended a small private school led by George Hitchcock, a former student of Jules-Joseph LeFebvre and Gustave Boulanger. Woodward, along with many other influenced students, joined George Hitchcock during the summers in Holland at the Edmongse School (1890-1915), a private studio spearheaded by Hitchcock at his residence in Egmond aan den Hoef.

While living and creating work in Paris, she presented works in the many exhibitions, salons, and gallery showings. She was accepted into the 1898 Paris Salon where she exhibited two works, Le sabot casse created in France and Recolte des pommes de terre, created in Holland. In 1903, she entered the Reims Exposition Internationale where she received a silver medal.

While studying abroad, Woodward made a name for herself within the American colony in Paris, a group of Americans studying fine arts in the heart of Paris. She became a part of the Union des Femmes Peintres et Sculpteurs. This group, established by Helene Bertaux (1825-1909), created a means for which female artists could create an established presence within the art world. Woodward was also a part of the Pittsburgh Art Association throughout her early life and the Hawaiian Academy of the Arts during her later career, a place where she exhibited pieces on numerous occasions.

Woodward lived in Paris throughout the first world war. After suffering from malnutrition, she was diagnosed with a heart impairment and was advised to travel to a warmer climate. She then traveled to Africa and Hawaii, where she took up residence in 1918 in the neighborhood of Waikiki. She became a well-known voice in the wealthy and artistic communities of Hawaii, commissioning many works for local patrons.

Her works have been exhibited in many galleries throughout the United States and France, including the Carnegie Institute in Pittsburgh, Pennsylvania. She exhibited for two exhibition seasons at the Institute in 1909, in between her back-and-forth travels to Paris. She was also exhibited throughout local galleries in Hawaii and the Honolulu Academy of Arts for her depictions of the Hawaiian Islands. Her works, A Honolulu Garden, Manoa Valley, and The Dunes are among her more well-known pieces that are representative of the Hawaiian landscape.

In early 1935, The State University of Iowa exhibited Woodward's piece entitled, The Dunes, in an exhibit show casing a small collection of masters from the Davenport Municipal Art Gallery, otherwise known as the Figge Art Museum. Woodward's piece was among many well-known artists, including Harry Van der Weyden and Richard E. Miller, both of whom also studied at the Académie Julian. The work is currently housed at the University of Iowa Museum of Art.

Woodward also wrote columns and articles for local magazines and newspapers in Hawaii. She wrote artist works columns, critiqued local exhibitions, and commented on the Hawaiian Islands as a harbinger of artistic inspiration. Her artwork was also used for the magazine, “Paradise in the Pacific” throughout the 1920s and 1930s. She is best known for her writings regarding her time within the art community in both Paris and in Holland, entitled, “Art Life in France and Holland.”

Woodward died at Queen's Hospital in Honolulu, Hawaii, on July 12, 1935, at the age of 67. Her remains were taken back to her place of birth and were placed at the Homewood Cemetery in Pittsburgh. Her works are still circulating between galleries, museums, and being sold at auction.
