= UPMC Shadyside =

- University of Pittsburgh Medical Center

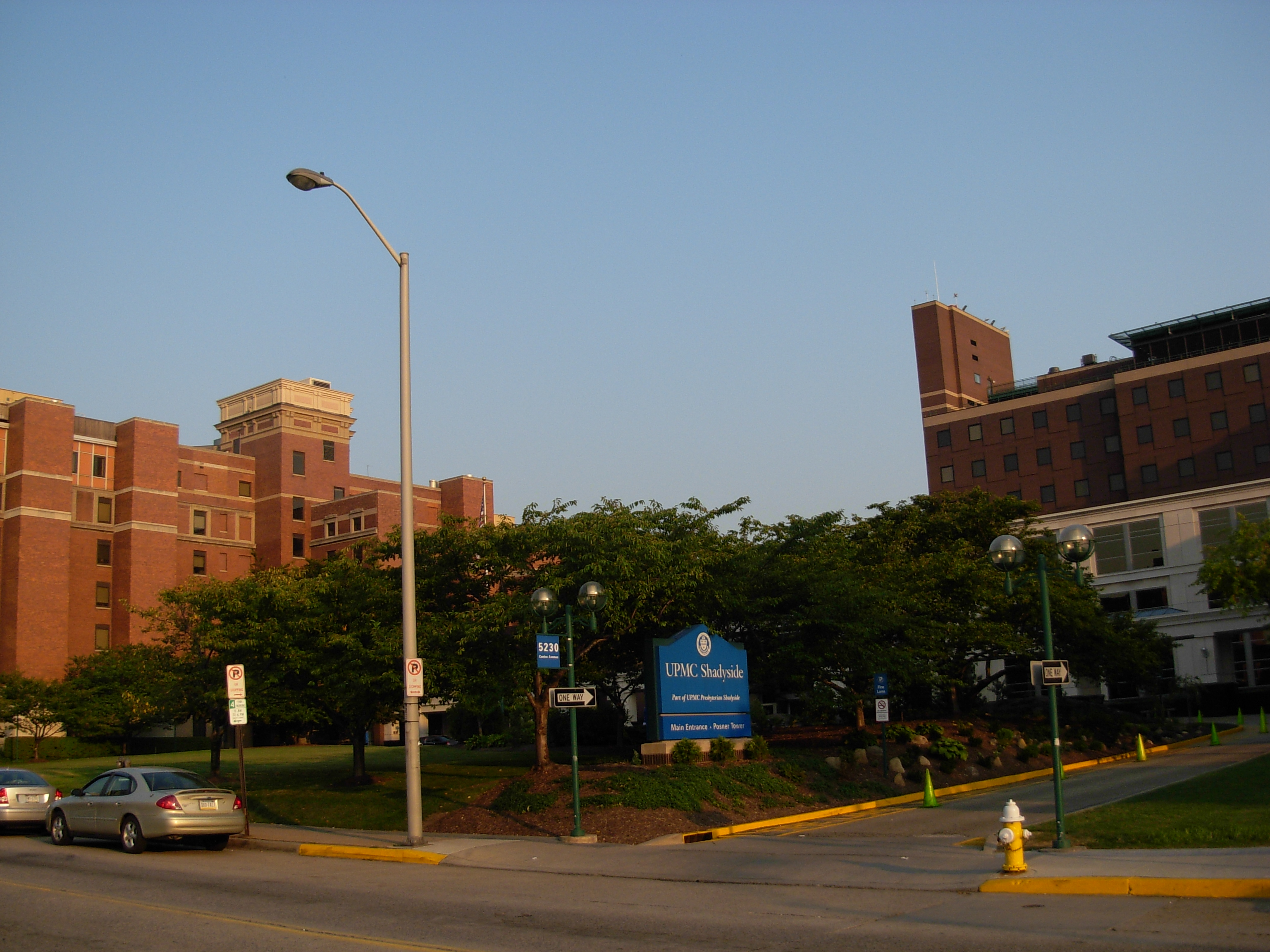
- UPMC Shadyside seen in 2007.

Geography
- Location: 5230 Centre Avenue, Shadyside, Pittsburgh, Pennsylvania, United States
- Coordinates: 40.454638°N 79.940056°W

Organization
- Type: Teaching
- Affiliated university: University of Pittsburgh School of Medicine

Services
- Emergency department: Yes
- Beds: 520

Helipads
- Helipad: FAA LID: PA16
Number	Length		Surface
Number	ft	m	Surface
H1	48 x 48	15 × 15	mats

History
- Former names: Shadyside Hospital; Homeopathic Medical and Surgical Hospital and Dispensary
- Opened: 1866

Links
- Website: www.upmc.com/locations/hospitals/shadyside
- Lists: Hospitals in Pennsylvania

UPMC Shadyside is a nationally ranked, 520-bed non-profit, tertiary, teaching hospital located in the Shadyside neighborhood of Pittsburgh, Pennsylvania. UPMC Shadyside is a part of the University of Pittsburgh Medical Center (UPMC), and grouped in with the flagship UPMC Presbyterian. The hospital is near UPMC's flagship campus which houses Presbyterian and Montefiore. As the hospital is a teaching hospital, it is affiliated with University of Pittsburgh School of Medicine. The hospital has an emergency room to handle emergencies, with a rooftop helipad to transport critical patients to and from the hospital. UPMC Shadyside houses the flagship campus of the UPMC Hillman Cancer Center, a nationally ranked cancer hospital.

Founded in as the Homeopathic Medical and Surgical Hospital and Dispensary, it changed its name to that of the neighborhood of Shadyside on May 12, 1938. Shadyside agreed to be bought by UPMC on June 5, 1996.

== History ==
In 1866, Herman H. Hofmann, Marcellin Coté, and John C. Burgher, started to gather donations to open a hospital specializing in homeopathic medicine in Pittsburgh. UPMC Shadyside was founded in 1866 with the name "Homeopathic Medical and Surgical Hospital and Dispensary" in the downtown area Pittsburgh.

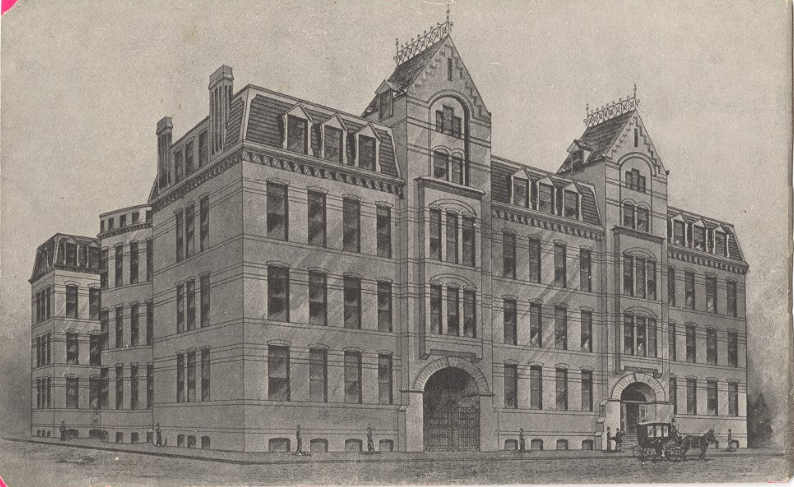
A scan of an illustration depicting the second Homeopathic Hospital at 146 Second Avenue in Downtown Pittsburgh near Smithfield Street.

Years later, in 1884 they moved to a new building also in the downtown neighborhood. In 1896, the hospital pioneered the first x-ray in western Pennsylvania.

Due to lack of space a new location for the hospital was inquired upon. In 1906 Alexander Peacock, a member of the Board, donated $25,000 toward the purchase of land at the current site in Pittsburgh's Shadyside development. Construction for the new hospital began in 1907, completed in January 1910, and opened its doors to patients on March 1, 1910, on a site in front of its current location.

In 1938, its name was changed to Shadyside Hospital to reflect its location in the Shadyside neighborhood. Many of the present buildings of UPMC Shadyside were constructed in 1972. During the 1960s, UPMC Shadyside Hospital became known for their cardiology department.

In 1997 Shadyside Hospital became part of the University of Pittsburgh Medical Center (UPMC) network when they merged with Presbyterian Hospital.

== Awards ==
In 2020 the hospital was recognized by Human Rights Campaign Foundation as a "Top Performer" in their forward thinking LGBTQ policies and initiatives.

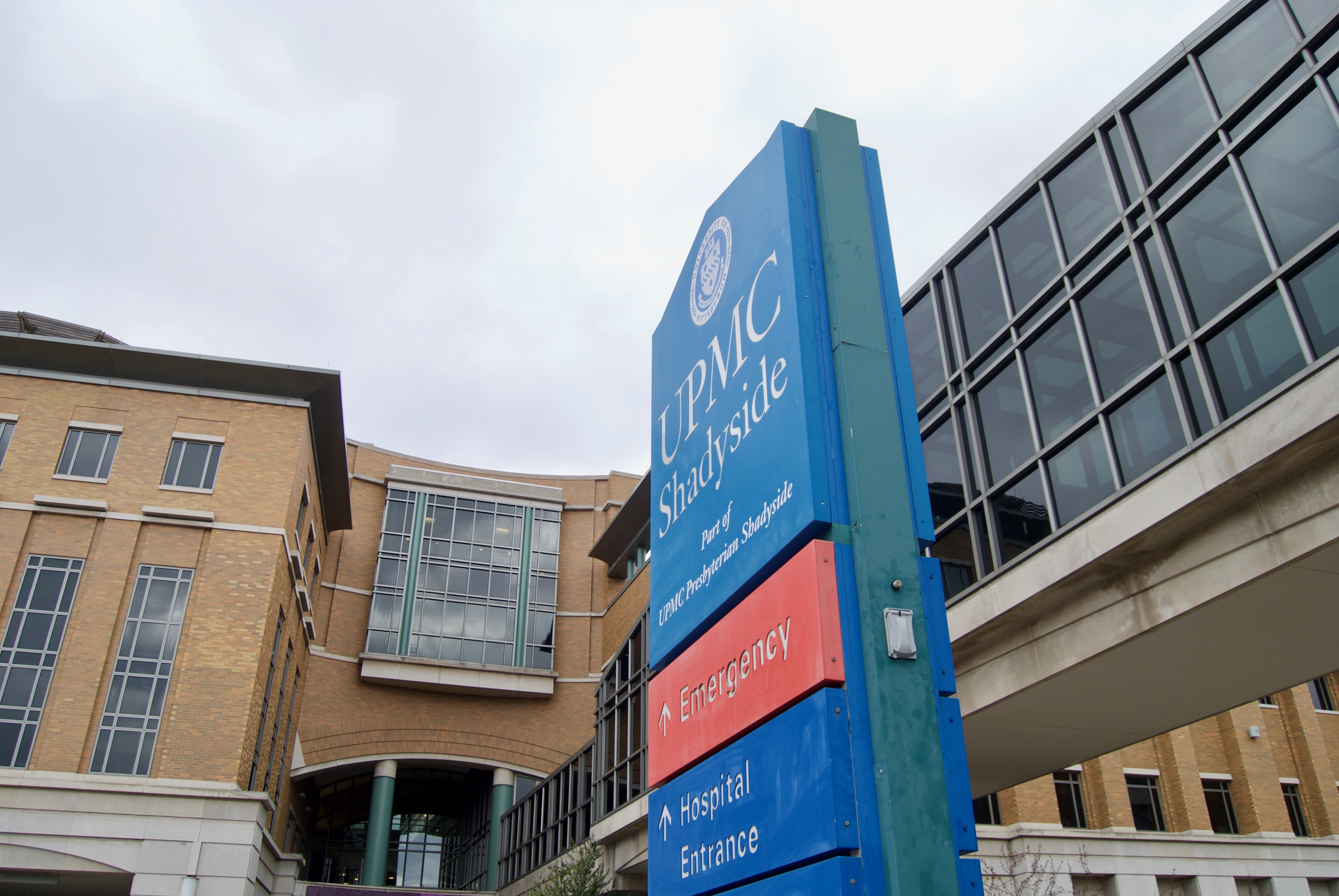
Signage outside of UPMC Shadyside

The hospital (ranked together with UPMC Presbyterian) ranked nationally in 11 adult specialties and as #2 in Pennsylvania (after Penn Presbyterian) on the 2020-21 U.S. News & World Report: Best Hospitals rankings.

2020-21 U.S. News & World Report Rankings for UPMC Presbyterian-Shadyside
Specialty	Rank (In the U.S.)	Score (Out of 100)
Cancer	#15	63.5
Cardiology & Heart Surgery	High Performing	53.7
Diabetes & Endocrinology	#46	55.1
Ear, Nose & Throat	#32	67.0
Gastroenterology & GI Surgery	#17	72.7
Geriatrics	#23	82.1
Nephrology	#40	56.4
Neurology & Neurosurgery	#24	72.1
Ophthalmology	Not Ranked	1.5
Orthopedics	#19	57.8
Psychiatry	High Performing	3.6
Pulmonology & Lung Surgery	#41	69.3
Rehabilitation	High Performing	4.5
Rheumatology	#12	5.4
Urology	#35	63.8

== Hillman Cancer Center ==
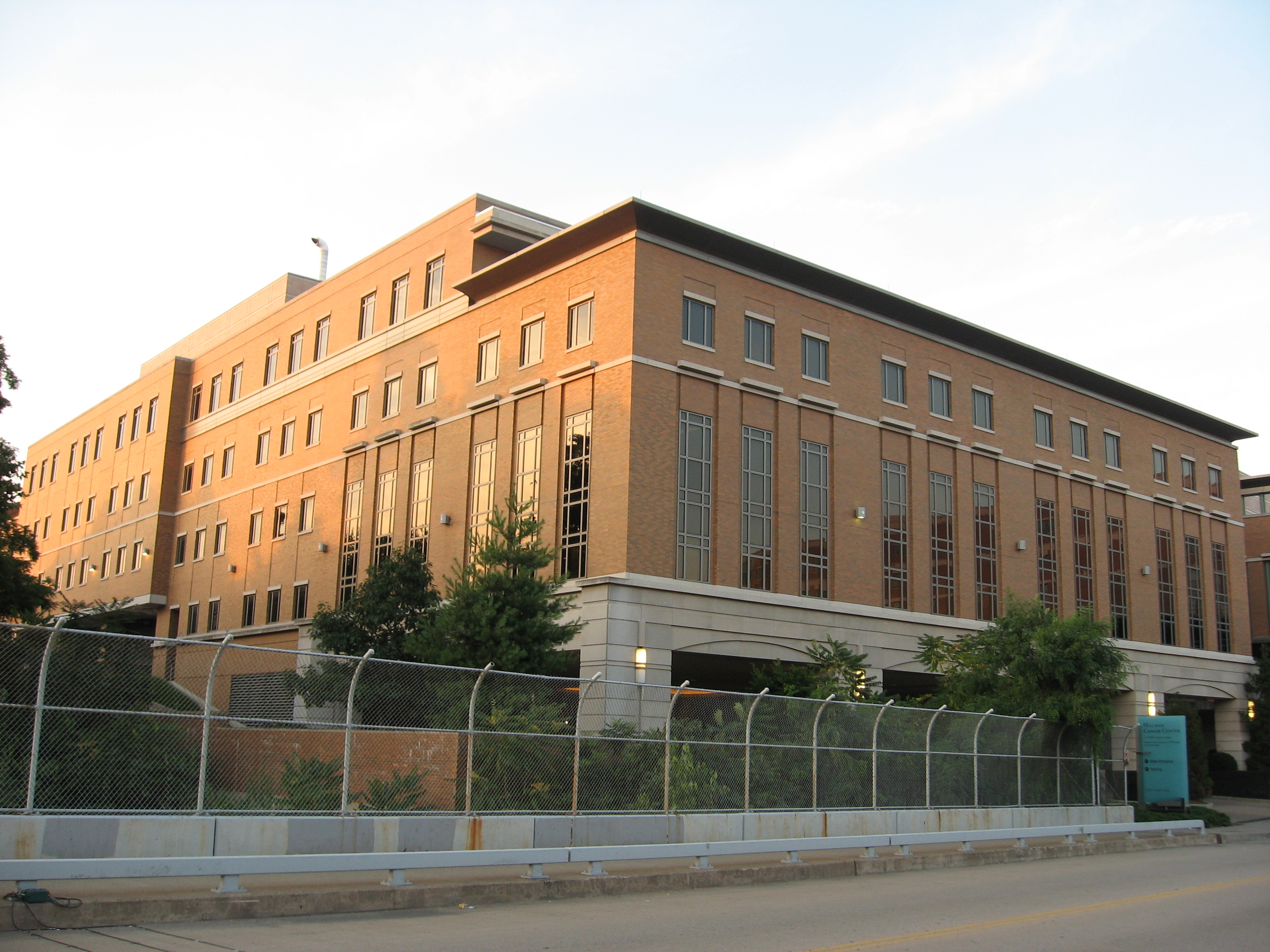
The Hillman Cancer Center in Shadyside, Pittsburgh

The UPMC Hillman Cancer Center (Hillman), previously titled the University of Pittsburgh Cancer Institute (UPCI), is a National Cancer Institute (NCI)-designated Comprehensive Cancer Center located in the Hillman Cancer Center in the Shadyside neighborhood of Pittsburgh, Pennsylvania, United States. The only NCI-designated cancer center in Western Pennsylvania, Hillman is composed of collaborative academic and research efforts between the University of Pittsburgh, the University of Pittsburgh Medical Center (UPMC), and Carnegie Mellon University.

The UPMC Hillman Cancer Center in the Shadyside neighborhood of Pittsburgh is the flagship facility for the clinical services and research activities. The $130 million, 350,000-square-foot, 5-story facility, designed by Pittsburgh architectural firm IKM, opened in 2002 in the Shadyside neighborhood of Pittsburgh. It is located directly across Centre Avenue from, and connected via a pedestrian bridge to, UPMC Shadyside hospital where cancer surgery and Intensity Modulated Radiation Therapy (IMRT) are conducted. The Hillman Cancer Center building houses both a research pavilion and a clinical pavilion connected by a three-story atrium.

== Notable people ==
=== Faculty ===
- Elizabeth Concordia (CEO from 2001 to 2007)
- Bernadette Mazurek Melnyk
- Alvin P. Shapiro (physician from 1956 to 1998)
- Nancy Caroline (former physician)

=== Deaths ===
- John M. Walker
- Bob O'Connor
- Skip Gougler
- Leon Falk Jr.
- William F. Knox
- Arnold Palmer
- Richard Caliguiri

== See also ==
- UPMC Hillman Cancer Center
- UPMC Presbyterian
- List of UPMC Hospitals
- University of Pittsburgh Medical Center
