= Henry Hillman =

American billionaire businessman

- Born: Henry Lea Hillman; December 25, 1918; Pittsburgh, Pennsylvania, U.S.
- Died: April 14, 2017 (aged 98); Pittsburgh, Pennsylvania, U.S.
- Education: Shady Side Academy; Taft School
- Alma mater: Princeton University
- Occupation: Businessman
- Spouse: Elsie Hilliard (m. 1945; died 2015)
- Children: 4
- Parent(s): J. Hartwell Hillman Jr. Juliet Cummins Lea

Henry Lea Hillman (December 25, 1918 – April 14, 2017) was an American billionaire businessman, investor, civic leader, and philanthropist. He was chairman of The Hillman Company, a family office and investment company headquartered in Pittsburgh, Pennsylvania, and owned by the Hillman family. He chaired the board of trustees of Hillman Family Foundations, which manages 18 named foundations.

== Early life ==
Henry Lea Hillman was born and raised in Pittsburgh, Pennsylvania. He was the fifth child and second son of John Hartwell Hillman Jr. (1880–1959) and his wife, Juliet Cummins Hillman (née Lea; 1885–1940). His father built upon his own father's small iron brokerage firm to create a diversified industrial operation with holdings in coal and coke, steel and utilities, energy, transportation, real estate, and banking.

Hillman attended Shady Side Academy in Pittsburgh, the Taft School in Watertown, Connecticut, and Princeton University, where he earned an A.B. degree in geology in 1941. He enlisted in the Navy before the United States entered World War II in December 1941 and served first as an aide to Rear Admiral Randall Jacobs, chief of the Bureau of Naval Personnel. He became a Naval aviator in 1942, holding the rank of lieutenant and serving until after the war's end in 1945.

== Business career ==
In January 1946, Hillman joined Pittsburgh Coke & Chemical, which produced and sold coke, merchant pig iron, and such coal-derived byproducts as activated carbon. J. H. Hillman & Sons (later renamed The Hillman Company) was the majority shareholder of this publicly traded firm. As vice president and a director, Henry expanded the company's manufacture and sale of finished chemicals and plasticizers. He became president of Pittsburgh Coke in 1955.

As a director of Pittsburgh's Colonial Trust Company, he worked with his father in 1959 to negotiate the consolidation of smaller banks and trust companies into Pittsburgh National Bank, ancestor of PNC Financial Services, today one of the largest financial institutions in the United States. Hillman served as a director of Pittsburgh National Bank from its founding until 1988.

The death of his father in 1959 put Hillman in charge of Hillman family holdings, which he expanded many fold. Years in advance of the growing market in private equity, he sold off industrial and chemical operations, took Pittsburgh Coke private, and remade Hillman into a diversified investment company. Just several of the scores of companies acquired and sold between the 1960s and 1990s were Marion Power Shovel Company, Copeland Refrigeration Corp, American Flyers Airline Corporation, Bahnson Service Company, Continental Trailways, Global Marine Systems, Joseph Magnin Co., Shakespeare Company, Read-Rite Corporation, Texstar Corporation, Perrigo, and Exide."

One of the first to invest in private equity funds, Hillman in 1972 became a founding limited partner in the first venture capital fund of the firm Kleiner Perkins. Through this fund and others, as well as directly, Hillman invested in Genentech, Tandem Computers, Hybritech, and numerous other high-tech start-ups in the Silicon Valley and elsewhere. The Hillman Company was the largest single venture capital investor in the country during the early 1980s.

In 1976, Hillman became the first limited partner in the leveraged buyout firm Kohlberg Kravis Roberts (KKR). Through KKR, Hillman participated in the buyouts of, among others, American Forest Products Corporation; L. B. Foster Company; Fred Meyer; Beatrice Companies, Inc. (Beatrice Foods); Duracell; and RJR Nabisco. The Hillman Company also became what Forbes magazine described as "one of the country's largest, and lowest-profile, commercial real estate developers", with properties from California to Florida. Energy exploration and investments during this same period included early and active development of coal-bed methane, a dynamic new segment of the petroleum industry.

During his career, Hillman served as a director of Chemical Bank & Trust Co. (an ancestor of JP Morgan Chase & Co.); the Copeland Corporation (chairman 1970–1986); Cummins Engine Company, Inc.; Edgewater Steel; General Electric Company; Global Marine Systems; Marion Power Shovel Company; Marquette Cement Manufacturing Company; Merck & Co., Inc.; National Steel Corporation; Nichols-Homeshield Inc.; Shakespeare Company; Texas Gas Transmission (chairman 1959–1975); and Wilson Marine Transit. He stepped down from active management of The Hillman Company in 2004. As chairman, he remained active in the company's governance.

Hillman was inducted into the Private Equity Hall of Fame. He was named Industrialist of the Year in 1968 by the Western Pennsylvania Chapter of the National Society of Industrial Realtors and Business Leader of the Year in 1989 by the Pennsylvania Chamber of Commerce.

== Philanthropy ==
Active in Pittsburgh civic leadership since the years of the city's first "renaissance" in the late 1940s, Hillman has served as a director or trustee of ACTION Housing, Inc.; the Carnegie Hero Fund Commission; Carnegie Institute; Carnegie Library of Pittsburgh; Children's Hospital of Pittsburgh; the Maurice Falk Medical Fund; Penn's Southwest Association; Pittsburgh Regional Planning Association; Regional Industrial Development Corporation of Southwestern Pennsylvania; the University of Pittsburgh, and the Urban Redevelopment Authority of Pittsburgh. He served as president of the Allegheny Conference on Community Development from 1967 to 1970 and as chair from 1970 to 1973.

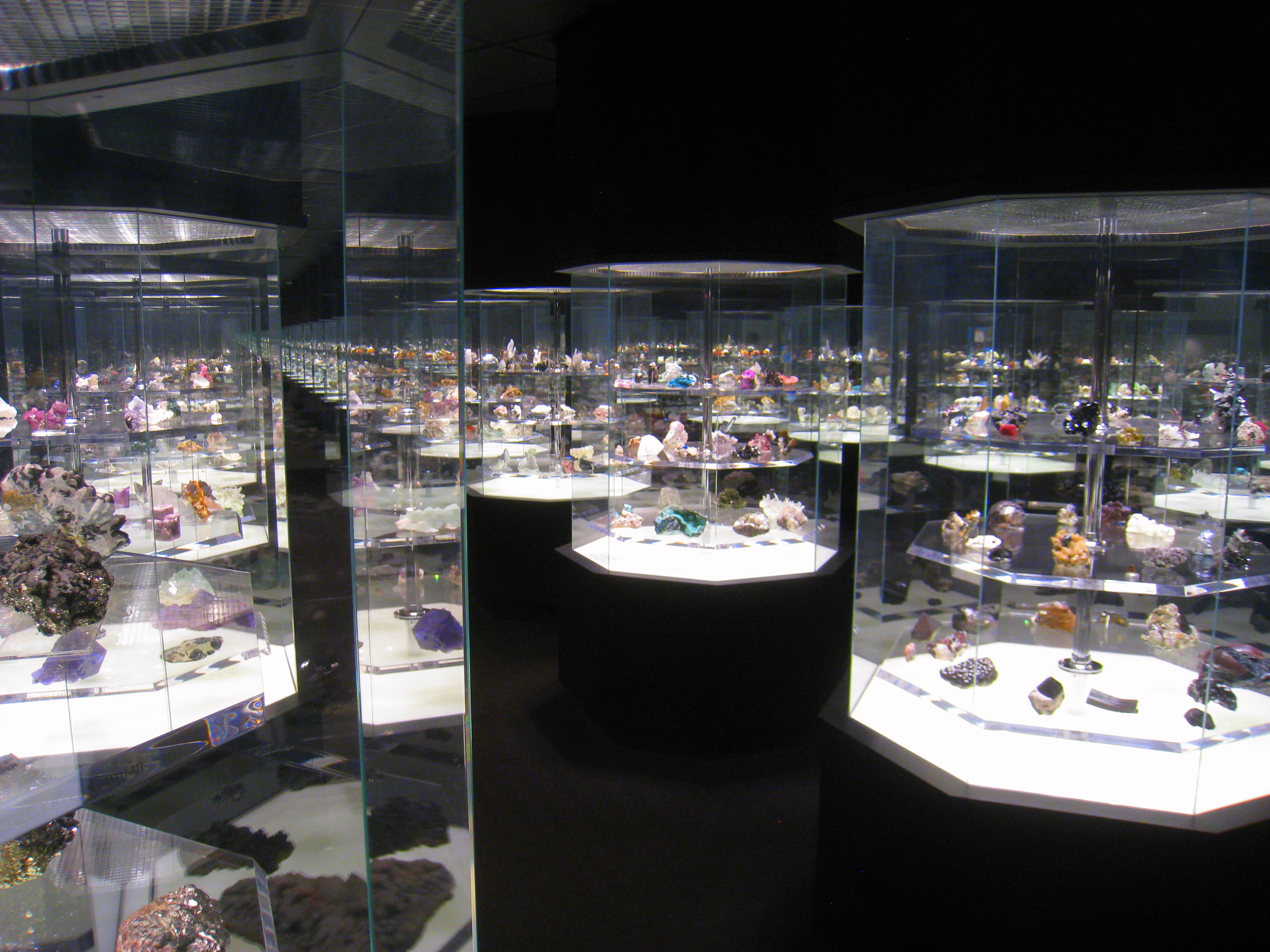
Hillman Hall of Minerals and Gems at the Carnegie Museum of Natural History in Pittsburgh

As chair of the board of trustees of Hillman Family Foundations, Hillman focused on philanthropic opportunities aimed at creating or enhancing a competitive advantage for Pittsburgh. Notable gifts have included the Hillman Library of the University of Pittsburgh, Hillman Hall of Minerals and Gems at the Carnegie Museum of Natural History, the Henry L. Hillman Professorship in Molecular Biology at Princeton University, the Henry L. Hillman Fund for art acquisition at the Carnegie Museum of Art, the Elsie Hillman Chair in Women and Politics at Chatham University, the Elsie Hilliard Hillman Chair of Women's Health Research at Magee-Womens Research Institute, the Hillman Cancer Center of the University of Pittsburgh Cancer Institute, the Hillman Fellows Program for Innovative Cancer Research at the University of Pittsburgh Cancer Institute, the Hillman Center for Pediatric Transplantation at UPMC Children's Hospital of Pittsburgh, endorsement assessments by the Advanced Robotics for Manufacturing Institute to help Western Pennsylvania organizations prepare students for careers in manufacturing, and the Hillman Center for Future-Generation Technologies at Carnegie Mellon University.

In 2012 Henry began to give additional annual contributions to the Henry L. Hillman Foundation to support community efforts and organizations that drive the development of new ideas across the nonprofit sector in Pittsburgh.

Hillman is a gold medalist of The Pennsylvania Society (with Elsie H. Hillman). Together, he and Elsie Hillman received the Tree of Life Award from the National Jewish Fund, the Sheepskin Award from the Pennsylvania Association of Colleges and Universities, and the gold medal award from the American Institute of Architects, Pittsburgh chapter.

== Personal life ==
Hillman married Elsie Hilliard (1925–2015) in Pittsburgh on May 12, 1945. They had four children: Juliet Lea Hillman Simonds, Audrey Hillman Fisher, Henry L. Hillman Jr., and William Talbott Hillman. Hillman died on April 14, 2017, aged 98.
