= Alvin P. Shapiro =

American physician

Coordinates: 40.441°N 79.909°W

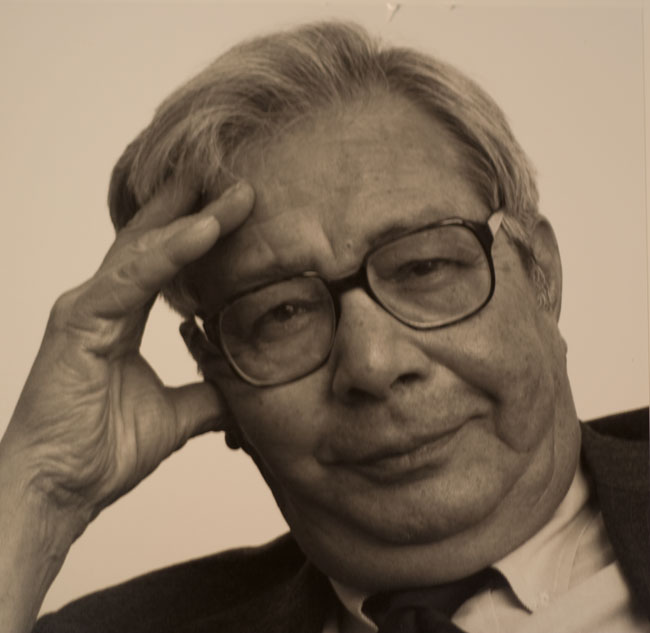
- Shapiro in 1993
- Born: December 28, 1920; Nashville, Tennessee, US
- Died: November 21, 1998 (aged 77); Pittsburgh, Pennsylvania, US
- Resting place: Homewood Cemetery, Pittsburgh, Pennsylvania
- Education: AB, Cornell University, 1941 MD, Long Island College Medicine, Brooklyn, 1944; Certification: Diplomate National Board Medical Examiners.; cert. Am. Board Internal Medicine.
- Occupations: Physician, educator
- Spouse: Ruth Thomson (married 1951)
- Children: 2

Alvin P. Shapiro (December 28, 1920 – November 21, 1998) was an American physician and professor primarily at the University of Pittsburgh School of Medicine. Shapiro was the recipient of a Lasker Award and was known for his research in hypertension, behavioral sciences, and related diseases.

== Career ==
Shapiro held intern and residency positions at Long Island College Hospital, Brooklyn, Goldwater Memorial Hospital, New York City, and Kings County Hospital. After training, he was an attending physician at hospitals in Parkland, Virginia, and Pittsburgh as well as the Dallas Presbyterian University Hospital and Shadyside Hospital.

He held academic positions at the Cincinnati College of Medicine from 1949 to 1951 and Southwestern Medical School, Texas, from 1951 to 1956. He was a member of the faculty of the School of Medicine at the University of Pittsburgh from 1956 to 1998, where he was successively assistant professor, associate professor, full professor, and emeritus professor.

Shapiro was a consultant for the American Medical Association Council on Drugs; he was the Medical Letter of Drugs and Therapy in 1960 as well as a Fulbright visiting professor at the University of Utrecht. He chaired special projects such as a National Heart Institute study committee and the National Hypertension Study Policy Advisory Board from 1972 to 1982.

== Publications ==
=== Books ===
Sources:

- Shapiro, A. P., & Waife, S. O. (1959). The clinical evaluation of new drugs. New York.
- Shapiro, A. P., Provoost, A. P., & De, J. W. (1977). Hypertension and brain mechanisms. Progress in Brain Research, v. 47. Amsterdam: Elsevier Scientific Publishing Company.
- Shapiro, A. P., & Baum, A. (1991). Behavioral aspects of cardiovascular disease. Perspectives in behavioral medicine. Hillsdale, N.J: L. Erlbaum Associates.
- Shapiro, A. P. (1996). Hypertension and stress: A unified concept. Mahwah, N.J: Lawrence Erlbaum Associates.

=== Journals ===
Shapiro was the author of over 155 journal articles in respected medical journals, and associate editor of:

- Psychosomatic Medicine, 1963–92
- Integrative Physiological and Behavioral Sci, 1990

== Awards and recognition ==
- Co-recipient Alfred Lasker Special Public Health award, 1980
- Honored Member of Year, Minute Men of University of Pittsburgh, 1995
- Fellow American College of Physicians, American Association for the Advancement of Science (elected fellow 1989)
- member of:
  - American Federation Clinical Research
  - American Psychosomatic Society (president 1975)
  - American Medical Association, American Heart Association (medical advisory board council high blood pressure, council on circulation, council on epidemiology)

The American Psychosomatic Society established the Alvin P. Shapiro Award in 2001.
