= William F. Knox =

American lawyer

Biographical details
- Born: January 29, 1885; Connellsville, Pennsylvania, U.S.
- Died: December 21, 1975 (aged 90); Pittsburgh, Pennsylvania, U.S.

Playing career
- 1905–1906: Yale
- Positions: Halfback, fullback

Coaching career (HC unless noted)
- 1907: Yale
- 1908: Carnegie Tech

Head coaching record
- Overall: 12–7–1

Accomplishments and honors

Championships
- 1 national (1907)

Awards
- Consensus All-American (1906)

William Francis Knox (January 29, 1885 – December 21, 1975) was an American football player and coach and lawyer. He played college football for Yale University and was selected as a first-team All-American halfback in 1906. He was the head coach of the 1907 Yale football team which finished the season with a record of 9–0–1. He later became an attorney and was a founder and member of the Pittsburgh law firm of Moorhead & Knox.

== Early years ==
Knox was born in Connellsville, Pennsylvania, in 1885. His father, Alfred C. Knox, was a Pennsylvania native and a banker. His mother, Annie E. Knox, was also a Pennsylvania native. At the time of the 1900 United States census, Knox was living in Ben Avon, a suburb of Pittsburgh, with his parents and three sisters Louise, Juliet, and Mary. His uncle was Philander C. Knox, who served as the United States Attorney General (1901–1904), United States Senator (1904–1909, 1917–1921), and United States Secretary of State (1909–1913).

== Yale and University of Pittsburgh ==
Knox enrolled at Yale University. While attending Yale, he played for the Yale Bulldogs football team and was selected as a first-team All-American halfback in 1906.

After graduating from Yale, he returned in the fall of 1907 as Yale's head football coach. Knox led the 1907 Yale football team to an undefeated season with a record of 9–0–1. The team's only setback was a 0–0 tie against Army.

During the period from 1899 to 1912, Yale had 14 different head football coaches in 14 years – despite compiling a combined record of 127–11–10 in those years. During that 14-year span, the Yale football team has also been recognized as the national championship team by one or more of the major national championship selectors on seven occasions – 1900 (Billingsley, Helms, Houlgate, National Championship Foundation, Parke Davis), 1901 (Parke Davis), 1902 (Parke Davis), 1905 (Parke Davis, Whitney), 1906 (Billingsley, Parke Davis, Whitney), 1907 (Billingsley, Helms, Houlgate, National Championship Foundation, Parke Davis, Whitney), and 1909 (Billingsley, Helms, Houlgate, National Championship Foundation, Parke Davis).

Knox later attended the University of Pittsburgh law school from which he graduated in 1910. At the time of the 1910 United States census, Knox was living with his parents and three sisters at the family home on Brighton Road in Ben Avon.

== Carnegie Mellon ==
While living in Pittsburgh, Knox served as the head coach of the 1908 Carnegie Tech Tartans football team, finishing with a record of 3 wins and 7 losses.

== Legal career and family ==
After graduating from law school, Knox had a long career as a lawyer in Pittsburgh. In 1917, he formed a law partnership with William S. Moorhead Sr., the father of William S. Moorhead, who later served as a U.S. Congressman from 1959 to 1981. Their firm, Moorhead and Knox, became a prestigious Pittsburgh law firm. Knox remained active in the firm until his retirement in 1973.

At the time of the 1920 United States census, Knox was living with his wife, Ruth T. Knox, and son William F. Knox Jr. at 6923 Brighton Road in Ben Avon, Pennsylvania. The family also had a live-in maid, Mary Kramer.

At the time of the 1930 United States census, Knox was living in Pittsburgh with his wife, Ruth, and their two sons, William F. Knox Jr. and James Knox.

Knox's son William F. Knox enrolled at Yale in 1936. He died at age 19 when he fell almost 200 feet to his death while climbing a train trestle over Manhasset Bay at daybreak.

In a draft registration card completed in 1942, Knox indicated that he was living at 8 Robin Road in Pittsburgh and that he was a member of the firm of Moorhead & Knox with offices in the Oliver Building in Pittsburgh.

Knox also served on the board of directors of National Union Fire Insurance Co. and the Duquesne Slag Co. Knox died at the Shadyside Hospital in Pittsburgh in December 1975 at age 90.

== Head coaching record ==
Year	Team	Overall	Conference	Standing	Bowl/playoffs
Yale Bulldogs (Independent) (1907)
1907	Yale	9–0–1			
Yale:		9–0–1			
Carnegie Tech Tartans (Independent) (1908)
1908	Carnegie Tech	3–7			
Carnegie Tech:		3–7			
Total:		12–7–1			
National championship Conference title Conference division title or championship game berth
