= UbiD protein domain =

UbiD
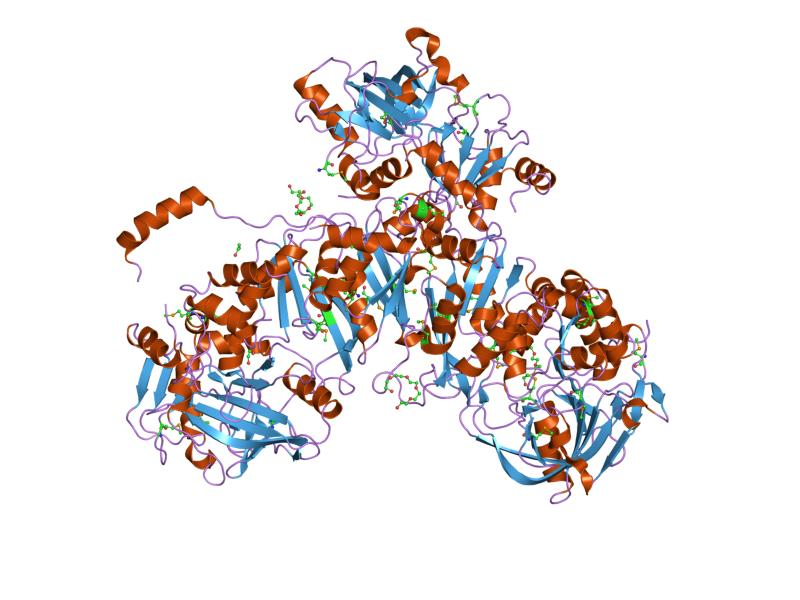
- crystal structure of 3-octaprenyl-4-hydroxybenzoate decarboxylase (ubid) from escherichia coli, northeast structural genomics target er459.

Identifiers
- Symbol: UbiD
- Pfam: PF01977
- InterPro: IPR002830
Available protein structures:
- PDB: IPR002830 PF01977 (ECOD; PDBsum)
- AlphaFold: IPR002830; PF01977

In molecular biology this protein domain, refers to UbiD, which is found in prokaryotes, archaea and fungi, with two members in Archaeoglobus fulgidus. They are related to UbiD, a 3-octaprenyl-4-hydroxybenzoate carboxy-lyase from Escherichia coli that is involved in ubiquinone biosynthesis. The member from Helicobacter pylori has a C-terminal extension of just over 100 residues that is shared, in part, by the Aquifex aeolicus homologue.

== Function ==
Ubiquinone is an essential electron carrier in prokaryotes. In Escherichia coli, the Ubiquinone biosynthesis pathway involves at least nine reactions whereby 3-octaprenyl4-hydroxybenzoate decarboxylase (UbiD) is an enzyme on the pathway which catalyses the conversion of the substrate 3-octaprenyl-4-hydroxybenzoate to the product, 2-octaprenyl phenol. E. coli ubiD- mutants have defects in Q8 biosynthesis, accumulate 4-hydroxy-3-octaprenylbenzoicacid (HP8B), and lack decarboxylase activity in vitro. However, E. coli ubiD- mutants retained the ability to produce about 20–25% of the normal levels of Q 4-hydroxy-3-octaprenylbenzoic acid. In essence, the protein domain, UbiD, is vital to creating ubiquinone, an essential electron carrier in the creation on energy.
