= Marquette Cement Manufacturing Company =

Cement manufacturing company

- Company type: Public; Subsidiary (1976–1982)
- Traded as: NYSE: MQC
- Industry: Building materials
- Founded: 1898
- Defunct: 1982
- Fate: Acquired by Gulf and Western Industries (1976), sold to Lone Star Industries (1982)
- Successor: Lone Star Industries
- Headquarters: Chicago, Illinois (1898–1974); Nashville, Tennessee (1974–1982)
- Key people: James E. Poole (President and CEO)
- Products: Cement
- Parent: Gulf and Western Industries (1976–1982)
- Subsidiaries: Lawrence Concrete Corporation

The Marquette Cement Manufacturing Company was an American cement manufacturing company.

== History ==
Marquette Cement was founded in 1898 in Chicago, Illinois. In 1972, James E. Poole was named president and chief executive officer of the company by its directors. Marquette Cement moved its headquarters to Nashville, Tennessee in 1974, and two years later it was acquired by Gulf and Western Industries, becoming part of the Gulf and Western Natural Resources Group. Gulf and Western later sold Marquette Cement to Lone Star Industries in 1982. In 1999, Lone Star Industries was bought by Dyckerhoff AG, which was later taken over by Buzzi Unicem.

=== Acquisitions ===
Throughout its history, Marquette Cement acquired many of its competitors.

In 1940, Marquette Cement purchased Hawkeye Portland Cement Company; in 1947, it bought both the Cumberland Portland Cement Company and the Hermitage Portland Cement Company.

On December 22, 1953, Marquette Cement announced it would purchase the Southern States Portland Cement Company and the Superior Cement division of the New York Coal Company.

On January 11, 1961, Marquette Cement shareholders approved plans to acquire North American Cement Corporation of New York for an exchange of stock. That same year, it acquired the Green Bag Cement Company.

In 1964, Marquette Cement acquired Cooney Bros., Inc., Plaza Concrete Corporation, and Mamaroneck Stone Corporation from the Cooney family through a subsidiary called Lawrence Concrete Corporation. However, it was later forced to divest the Cooney assets to Westchester Concrete, Inc. (Westcon) due to antitrust concerns.
