= Aromatic acid =

Aromatic acids are a type of aromatic compound. Included in that class are substances containing an aromatic ring and an organic acid functional group. There are several categories of aromatic acids including:

- Phenolic acids: substances containing an aromatic ring and an organic carboxylic acid function (C6-C1 skeleton).
- Aromatic amino acids
