= The Young in Heart =

1938 film by Richard Wallace

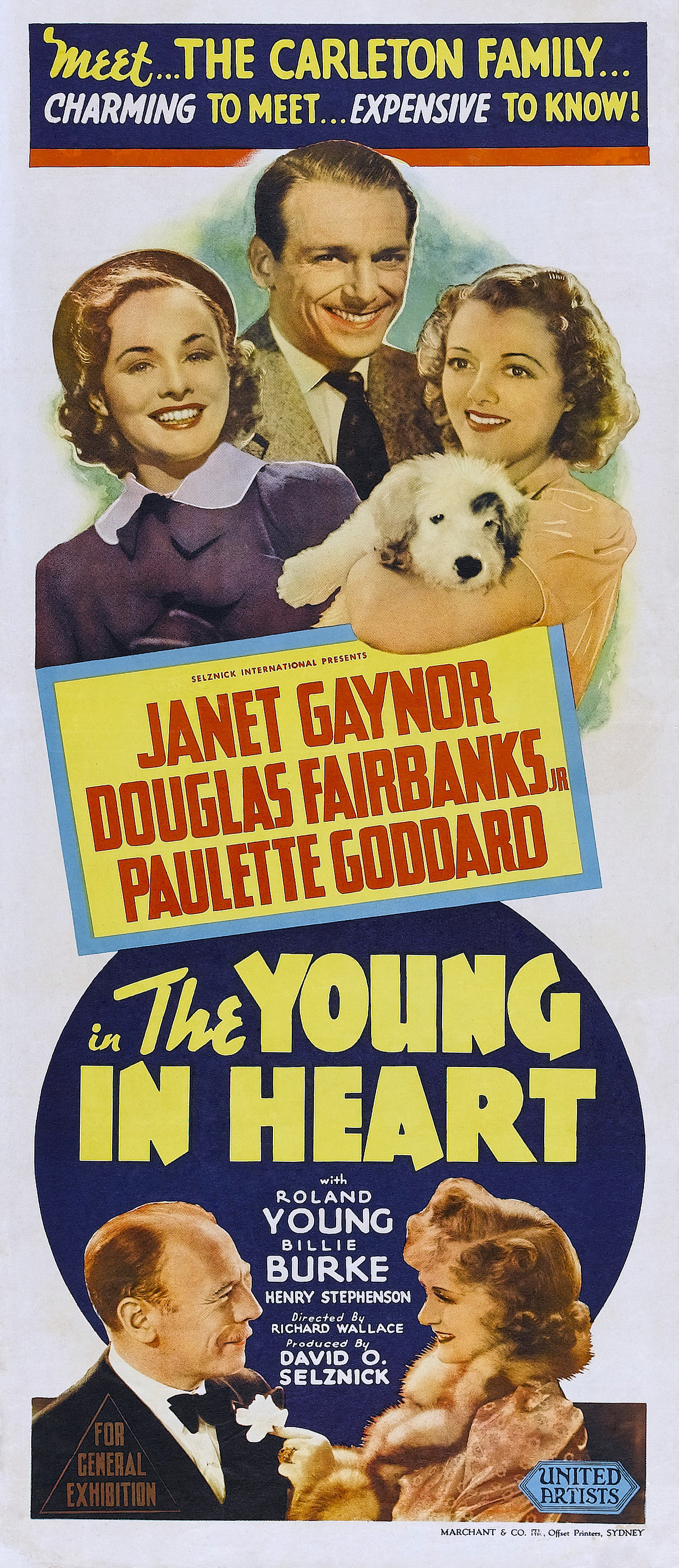
- Australian theatrical release poster
- Directed by: Richard Wallace
- Written by: Charles Bennett (adaptation)
- Screenplay by: Paul Osborn
- Based on: The Gay Banditti (novel) by I. A. R. Wylie
- Produced by: David O. Selznick
- Starring: Janet Gaynor; Douglas Fairbanks Jr.; Paulette Goddard; Roland Young; Billie Burke
- Cinematography: Leon Shamroy
- Edited by: Hal C. Kern
- Music by: Franz Waxman
- Production company: Selznick International Pictures
- Distributed by: United Artists
- Release date: November 3, 1938 (US)
- Running time: 90 minutes
- Country: United States
- Language: English

The Young in Heart is a 1938 American comedy film produced by David O. Selznick, directed by Richard Wallace, and starring Janet Gaynor, Douglas Fairbanks Jr., and Paulette Goddard. The supporting cast features Roland Young and Billie Burke. This was Richard Carlson's feature film debut, preceding The Duke of West Point by a month.

The screenplay by Paul Osborn was adapted by Charles Bennett from the novel The Gay Banditti, by I. A. R. Wylie, serialized in The Saturday Evening Post from February 26 to March 26, 1938.

== Plot ==
A family of con artists led by "Colonel" Anthony "Sahib" Carleton and his wife "Marmy" are working the French Riviera in search of wealthy potential mates for their daughter George-Anne and son Richard. Sahib, a former actor, passes himself off as an officer who served with the Bengal Lancers in India. George-Anne flirts with her Scottish suitor, Duncan Macrae, whom she dismisses when she learns that he is not rich. Richard has managed to get himself engaged to the wealthy, but rather plain Adela Jennings. Meanwhile, Sahib cheats her American senator father out of a large sum of money at poker. The local police find out about the Carleton family, provide them with complimentary train tickets to London, courtesy of Mr. Jennings, and order them to leave the country.

On the train, George-Anne meets a lonely old spinster named Miss Ellen Fortune, who inherited a fortune from her former fiancé, with whom she had quarreled in her youth. The kindhearted Miss Fortune invites George-Anne and her family to her first-class compartment, and the penniless family eagerly accepts, hoping to swindle her out of some of her money. While Miss Fortune treats them to dinner, the train derails, and they manage to extricate the old woman from the wreckage. Grateful, she invites them to stay with her at her London mansion. Seeing an opportunity to make their way into Miss Fortune's will, they treat her with kindness and spend evenings with her. Sahib and Richard also go out looking for jobs in order to persuade both her and her suspicious lawyer, Felix Anstruther, that they can be trusted.

Meanwhile, Duncan looks up George-Anne, whom he still loves, despite her repeated rejections and her family's continued shady activities. He finds Sahib a job as a Flying Wombat car salesman. The initially reluctant colonel is soon applying his con artist skills so successfully that he is promoted to manager of the London branch. Richard also takes a job, as a mail clerk at an engineering firm when he sees Leslie Saunders working there. She is also attracted to him, despite his completely frank admissions about his flawed character. Soon he is planning to take night courses in engineering. Gradually the two men begin to find the value of honest work and start to feel guilty about taking advantage of Miss Fortune. George-Anne and Marmy also honestly care about the old woman, but all four believe the others are still only after the inheritance.

Miss Fortune eventually learns about the Carletons' background from Anstruther, but she informs George-Anne that she is going to have a new will written, leaving everything to the Carletons. At a dinner party, Miss Fortune collapses, leaving the family legitimately distressed. Gathered in worried watch outside her sick room, they dismiss Anstruther's news that she no longer has any money and she will even lose her house. Marmy, Sahib and Richard retort she will never lack for a home or their care, much to Anstruther and George-Anne's surprise.

Sometime later, a recovered Miss Ellen drives Anstruther uncomfortably fast in her Flying Wombat to the Carletons' house, where she now lives. George-Anne is married to Duncan, and Richard to Leslie.

== Cast ==
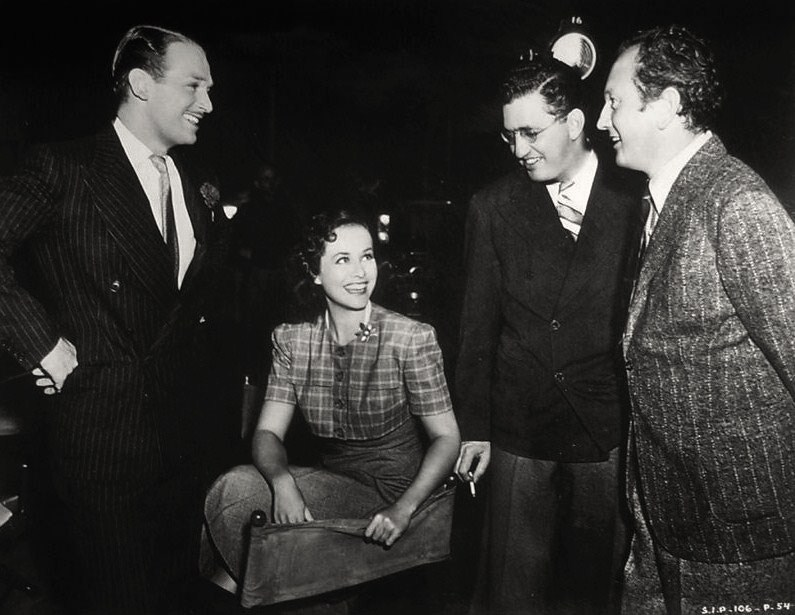
From left to right: Douglas Fairbanks Jr., Paulette Goddard, producer David O. Selznick, and director Richard Wallace

- Janet Gaynor as George-Anne Carleton
- Douglas Fairbanks Jr. as Richard Carleton
- Paulette Goddard as Leslie Saunders
- Roland Young as Col. Anthony "Sahib" Carleton
- Billie Burke as Marmy Carleton
- Minnie Dupree as Ellen Fortune
- Henry Stephenson as Felix Anstruther
- Richard Carlson as Duncan Macrae
- Lawrence Grant as Mr. Hutchins, the Flying Wombat managing director
- Walter Kingsford as Inspector
- Eily Malyon as Sarah, Miss Fortune's servant
- Tom Ricketts as Andrew, Miss Fortune's butler
- Irvin S. Cobb as Mr. Jennings
- Lucile Watson as Mrs. Jennings
- Margaret Early as Adela Jennings

== Production ==
The Broadway stars Maude Adams and Laurette Taylor originally screen tested for the part of Miss Fortune, which eventually went to Minnie Dupree. The screen tests of Adams and Taylor, made by David Selznick, survive and are the only audio-visual record of the actresses (although Taylor did star in a couple of silent films). Taylor's screen test can be seen on the DVD of Broadway: The Golden Age.

This was Gaynor's final film role before retiring while at the height of her career (she did make one more film, 1957's Bernardine).

Principal photography on The Young in Heart took place from May 2 to June 26, 1938.

The six-passenger 2-door sedan Flying Wombat featured in the film was actually the one-of-a-kind prototype Phantom Corsair. The Phantom Corsair concept car was built in 1938 and designed by Rust Heinz of the H. J. Heinz family and Maurice Schwartz of the Bohman & Schwartz coachbuilding company in Pasadena, California.

== Reception ==
The Young in Heart was reviewed in Variety, where the film received a positive review; "This is a beautiful and deeply touching picture, skilfully adapted from I.A.R. Wylie's poignant magazine story." Despite favorable critical reviews, the film lost $517,000 at the box office.

Franz Waxman received two Oscar nominations, for Best Music, Original Score and Best Music, Scoring, for his work in The Young in Heart. Leon Shamroy's cinematography was also nominated.
