= Rust Heinz =

American car and boat designer

- Born: Henry Heinz; October 18, 1914; Pittsburgh, Pennsylvania, United States
- Died: July 29, 1939 (aged 24); Lincoln Highway near Versailles, Pennsylvania, United States
- Cause of death: Car accident
- Resting place: Homewood Cemetery, Pittsburgh
- Occupations: Car and boat designer
- Notable work: 1938 Phantom Corsair
- Relatives: Jack Heinz (brother); Henry J. Heinz (grandfather)

Rust Heinz (October 18, 1914 – July 24, 1939) was an American car and boat designer. He is perhaps best known for designing the 1938 Phantom Corsair, a prototype car built on a Cord 810 chassis by the coach builder Bohman & Schwartz, incorporating a Lycoming 190 bhp V8 engine, weighing two tons and seating six people. The Phantom Corsair project was helped by finance from his aunt. Following his death, the car was never mass-produced and the prototype remains the only one ever made.

== Background ==
Heinz was born in 1914 in Pittsburgh, Pennsylvania, the second son of Howard Covode Heinz and Elizabeth Granger Heinz, and younger brother of Henry John "Jack" Heinz, II. They were grandsons of Henry J. Heinz who founded the Heinz empire. In 1937 he married Helen Clay Goodloe.

Heinz studied naval architecture at Yale University and Westlawn Academy of Yacht Design and designed a number of speedboats. He abandoned his studies in 1936 and went to live with his aunt in Pasadena. He set up a design studio and established himself as an automobile designer in California, to pursue a passion he held since 1936 when he was 21 years old, where he designed a delivery vehicle called the Comet for the Heinz company, which was built by the Square Deal Body Company on an Autocar chassis intended to be used for promotional work.

He then designed the Phantom Corsair.

== Death ==
Heinz was killed on July 24, 1939, in a car accident at Westinghouse Bridge in Wilkinsburg, Pennsylvania.

Heinz had allowed his friend Phil Brainard to drive his open Buick home from a dance he was attending. During the journey Brainard's trilby hat flew off.

After a detour to collect the hat, the Buick ventured back on to the Lincoln Highway near Versailles and was broadsided by an unseen vehicle.

Six people were injured in the crash and Heinz died the following morning from head injuries.

Heinz is buried at Homewood Cemetery, Pittsburgh, Pennsylvania in a private mausoleum (section 14, lot 61, grave 7) with other family members.

Other family members also interred in the mausoleum include Robert Eugene Heinz (1899, grave 8), Henry J Heinz (1919, grave 4), Clarence Noble Heinz (1920, grave 6), Clifford S Heinz (1935, grave 3), Howard Heinz (1941, grave 5), Elizabeth Rust Heinz (1952, grave 1), Henrietta D Heinz (1954, grave 2), Dorothy Louise Heinz (1979, grave 4).

== See also ==
- Phantom Corsair
- Jack Heinz
- Henry J. Heinz
