= Popular Science (film series) =

1935–1949 series of U.S. short films

- Produced by: Jerry Fairbanks
- Production company: Paramount Pictures
- Running time: 10 minutes
- Country: United States
- Language: English

Popular Science is a 1935–1949 American series of short educational films produced by Jerry Fairbanks. The series, comprising 72 10-minute episodes, was photographed in Magnacolor and released by Paramount Pictures.

Produced with the cooperation of Popular Science magazine, the series featured advances in medicine, aviation, science and technology, television, home improvement, planes, trains and automobiles, as well as an assortment of strange and whimsical inventions.

== Series contents ==
Each episode comprises a set of unrelated topics. For example, in episode L7-6 (1948):

- frozen TV dinners
- mechanical brain at UCLA (the world’ first mechanical computer)
- the Northrop "Flying Wing"

The following are examples of topics covered across the series:

- building Hoover Dam (1935)
- telephone answering machine (1936)
- building the San Francisco–Oakland Bay Bridge (1936)
- contact lenses (1936)
- the world's first full-scale (whole body) X-ray technique (1936)
- the birth of Plastic Surgery (1937)
- Rust Heinz and his Phantom Corsair car (1938)
- tour of Fleischer Studios in Miami which produced animated cartoons for Paramount (1939)
- Philo T. Farnsworth, "the father of television" (1939)
- the Electron Microscope (1942)
- Frank Lloyd Wright and his architectural school (1942)
- Jet Aircraft (1946)
- the Academy Award-nominated Moon Rockets (1947)
- fuel from corn cobs (1949)

== Accolades ==
During its 14-year theatrical run, the series was honored with numerous awards and acclaim, including two Academy Award nominations. The series also received a Special Commendation from the US Department of War in 1943 for its unparalleled coverage of American military technology involved in World War II.

== Television and home media ==
The series was first acquired on American television in 1951, and has been shown on the American Movie Classics cable network, hosted by Nick Clooney and Bob Dorian. The series, as well as the rest of the Jerry Fairbanks film library, is owned by Shields Pictures, which released a DVD in 2008 of some of the original Popular Science sequences.
