= H. John Heinz III Center for Science, Economics and the Environment =

Former American nonpartisan nonprofit organization

The H. John Heinz III Center for Science, Economics and the Environment
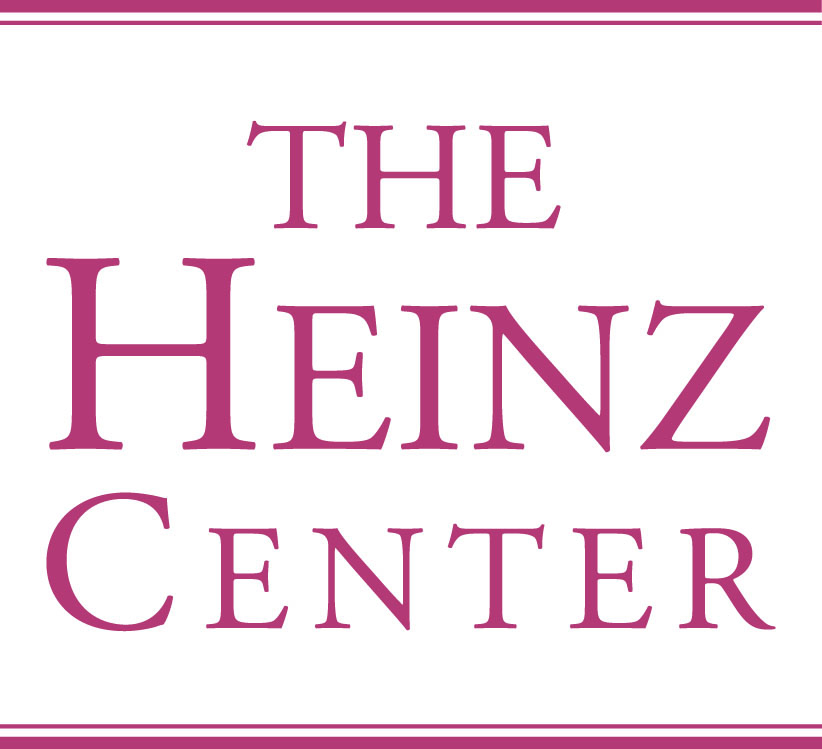
- Founded: 1995
- Founder: Teresa Heinz
- Purpose: Biodiversity Protection, Managing Phosphorus in Agricultural Soils to Improve Chesapeake Bay Water Quality, Supporting the Development of National Indicators and Monitoring Systems, Wildlife Conservation Program, and Climate Change Information for Local Decision-Making
- Location: Washington D.C., United States
- Key people: Mark Gorenberg, Chair of the Board of Trustees; Teresa Heinz, Vice Chair of Board of Trustees; and Dr. Thomas Lovejoy, Biodiversity Chair
- Website: www.heinzctr.org

The H. John Heinz III Center for Science, Economics and the Environment was a nonpartisan nonprofit organization headquartered in Washington, D.C. The Center brought together representatives of business, government, the scientific community and the environment community to collaborate on the development of environmental policy and science-based solutions to environmental challenges to society. The Heinz Center is best known as the creator of the State of the Nation's Ecosystems reports, which have become seminal references for U.S. policy makers and environmental managers on the conditions of and trends in U.S. ecosystems and habitats and the goods and services they provide. The Center was founded in 1995, in tribute to U.S. Senator H. John Heinz III of Pennsylvania after his untimely death in 1991, and closed in 2013.

== History ==
=== Origin ===
The Heinz Center was conceived of by the wife of the late Senator H. John Heinz III, Teresa Heinz, who had a vision for a Center where experts from business, science, government and non-governmental organizations could come together to solve seemingly intractable environmental challenges. Following Senator Heinz' death in 1991, The Vera I. Heinz Endowment and several others made a $20 million gift, one of the largest grants ever made to the environment, to create the John Heinz Center, in memory of Senator Heinz. The Center was founded in 1995 in Washington, D.C.

== State of the Nation's Ecosystems 2002 and 2008 ==
=== The State of The Nation's Ecosystems ===
The State of The Nation's Ecosystems was designed to provide an impartial and comprehensive understanding of the state of and trends in ecosystems, much the way decision makers use gross domestic product (GDP) to gauge national economic health. As part of the project, The Heinz Center published two State of the Nation's Ecosystems reports, one in 2002 and one in 2008, and a report on environmental data gaps and policy roadmap for environmental information. Since their publication, the State of the Nation's Ecosystems reports have become seminal references for national and regional policymakers and resource managers on the condition and use of ecosystems in the United States. The reports were created with the input of more than 300 scientific experts, who agreed upon a set of 108 indicators to track trends in the health of distinct U.S. ecosystems—coasts and oceans, farmlands, forests, freshwaters, grasslands and shrublands, and urban and suburban land-use types—on the national, regional, and local levels.

== Heinz Center Publications ==
- Forest Sustainability in the Development of Bioenergy in the US, ; The Pinchot Institution for Conservation Leadership in Conservation Thought, Policy and Action; and The H. John Heinz III Center for Science, Economics and the Environment, June 2010.
- Carbon Capture and Storage Development in China, ; The H.John Heinz III Center for Science, Economics and the Environment, 2010.
- Measuring the Results of Wildlife Conservation Activities, ; The H. John Heinz III Center for Science, Economics and the Environment, 2009.
- Indicators of Ecological Effects on Air Quality, ; The H. John Heinz III Center for Science, Economics and the Environment, 2009.
- Resilient Coasts: A Blueprint for Action, ; The H.John Heinz III Center for Science, Economics and the Environment and Ceres 2009.
- The State of Nation's Ecosystems 2008: Measuring the Lands, Waters, and Living Resources of the United States,; The H. John Heinz III Center for Science, Economics and the Environment, 2008.
- Environmental Information: A Road Map to the Future, ; The H. John Heinz III Center for Science, Economics and the Environment, 2008.
- Strategies for Managing the Effects of Climate Change on Wildlife and Ecosystems, ; The H. John Heinz III Center for Science, Economics and the Environment, 2008.
- Landscape Pattern Indicators for the Nation, ; The H. John Heinz III Center for Science, Economics, and the Environment, 2008.
- Filling the Gaps: Priority Data Needs and Key Management Challenges for National Reporting on Ecosystems Condition, ; The H. John Heinz III Center for Science, Economics and the Environment, May 2006.
- Following the Paper Trail: Impact of Magazine and Dimensional Lumber Production on Gas Emissions: A Case Study; The H. John Heinz III Center for Science, Economics and the Environment, 2006.
- Innovation by Design: Improving Learning Networks in Coastal Management, ; The H. John Heinz III Center for Science, Economics and the Environment, 2004.
- The Coastal Zone Management Act: Developing a Framework for Identifying Performance Indicators, ; The H. John Heinz III Center for Science, Economics and the Environment, 2003.
- Human Links to Coastal Disasters, ; The H. John Heinz III Center for Science, Economics and the Environment, 2002.
- Dam Removal Research: Status and Prospects, ; The H. John Heinz III Center for Science, Economics and the Environment, October 23–24, 2002.
- The Hidden Cost of Coastal Hazards: Implications for Risk Assessment and Mitigation; The H. John Heinz III Center for Science, Economics and the Environment, 2000.
- Fishing Grounds: Defining a New Era for American Fisheries Management; The H. John Heinz III Center for Science, Economics and the Environment, 2000.

== See also ==
- Global change
- Climate change
- Green chemistry
- Environmental indicators
