= Jack Heinz =

American business executive (1908–1987)

- Born: Henry John Heinz II; July 10, 1908; Pittsburgh, Pennsylvania, U.S.
- Died: February 23, 1987 (aged 78); Hobe Sound, Florida, U.S.
- Education: Yale University; University of Cambridge
- Occupations: Business executive, former CEO of the H. J. Heinz Company
- Children: John Heinz
- Relatives: Henry J. Heinz (grandfather) Donald Trump (fourth cousin)

Henry John Heinz II (July 10, 1908 – February 23, 1987) was an American business executive and CEO of the H. J. Heinz Company based in Pittsburgh, Pennsylvania, US. His grandfather Henry J. Heinz founded the company in the nineteenth century, and he worked in a variety of positions within the company before becoming CEO.

Heinz II was the father of John Heinz, a Republican member of the U.S. House of Representatives and Senate, who died in a 1991 plane crash.

== Early life, education, early career ==
Heinz was born in Pittsburgh to Howard Covode Heinz and Elizabeth Granger (Rust) Heinz. His grandfather Henry J. Heinz had founded the H. J. Heinz Company, and his father worked for the company for decades, becoming president after the founder died.

Heinz II was educated at Choate, and graduated from Yale University, where he was a member of the Skull and Bones secret society. He also earned a degree from Cambridge University. During the summers, he worked for his father's Heinz Company in the pickling and salting stations, as bookkeeper and as handyman. He later joined the sales force in England.

In 1932, Heinz anonymously published an account of a trip alongside Welsh journalist Gareth Jones to the Soviet Union the previous year, titled "Experiences in Russia-1931: A diary." The pair travelled widely across Soviet Russia and Ukraine, and witnessed the effects of the ongoing campaign of dekulakization on the peasant population.

== Marriage and family ==
Heinz married Joan Diehl, a pioneer aviator, in 1935. They had one son, H.J. Heinz III. They established their home, Rosemont Farm, in the Fox Chapel suburb of Pittsburgh. The couple divorced in 1942.

In 1953, Heinz married Drue Maher, with whom he shared a love of philanthropy, skiing, art collecting, and world travel.

== Leadership of H.J. Heinz Company ==
Heinz started work early in his grandfather's company, learning every aspect of the business. In 1941, he advanced to become president of the Heinz Company upon his father's death of a stroke.

He led the company through the challenges of World War II. For a time the Heinz plant in Pittsburgh was converted to producing gliders for the War Department. He made five trips to England during the war: once to see about the bombed Heinz plant in Harlesden, and several times by request of the British government to assist with relieving its food shortages. He also aided the Netherlands with their food challenges.

As chairman of the United War Fund, Heinz routinely gave speeches in the Pittsburgh region and elsewhere about food conservation, rationing, and allocations. After the war, he served as chairman of the Community Chest in Pittsburgh, which became the United Way, a national organization with chapters across the country.

As president of the Heinz Company, Jack launched subsidiaries in the Netherlands, Portugal, Venezuela, Japan, and Italy, establishing a large international network. Acquisitions of Star-Kist Foods Inc. and Ore-Ida Foods Inc. are considered the hallmarks of his tenure. He also presided over the opening of a baby food plant on mainland China.

=== Resignation ===
In 1966, Heinz resigned as president and CEO. For the first time in company history, a non-family member, Robert Burt Gookin, was chosen as CEO to manage day-to-day operations. Heinz served as chairman of the board from 1966 until his death.

== Philanthropy ==
After the war, Heinz teamed up with Richard King Mellon and Pittsburgh mayor David Lawrence for Renaissance I, a plan to improve and modernize Pittsburgh. Redevelopment included smoke-control ordinances to clear the air of smoke and soot from the steel mills. This also helped improve water quality in the city's rivers, for which additional environmental laws were passed.

Heinz was the driving force for the creation of downtown Pittsburgh's Cultural District, a major legacy of his work as a philanthropist and community leader. He was the first chairman of the Heinz Endowments, serving from 1941 until his death in 1987. One of his early projects was the conversion and restoration of Loew's Penn Theater to the current Heinz Hall, home of the Pittsburgh Symphony.

Heinz was one of the original investors in the city's effort to win an NHL franchise, becoming part owner of the Pittsburgh Penguins from 1967 until the early 1970s.

== Politics ==
A lifelong Republican, Heinz chaired the U.S. arm of the International Chamber of Commerce from 1948 to 1951. He was tapped by President Dwight D. Eisenhower to head a special aid mission to assess the effectiveness of an emergency economic aid program to Pakistan. He also chaired the U.S. delegation to the Economic Commission for Europe in 1958 and 1959. He was a member of the Steering Committee of the Bilderberg Group.

== Honors ==
In 1979, Queen Elizabeth II made Heinz an Honorary Commander of the Order of the British Empire, citing him "for significant contribution in the furtherance of British-American relationships, especially in the cultural, educational and economic fields."

He received decorations from Italy, France, and Greece.

== Death ==
On 23 February 1987, Henry John Heinz II died of cancer at the family's winter home in Hobe Sound, Florida, at the age of 78.
