= André Heinz =

American environmentalist

- Born: December 9, 1969 (age 56)
- Occupation: Environmentalist
- Spouse: Maria Marteinsdottir
- Parents: John Heinz; Teresa Heinz
- Relatives: Christopher Heinz (brother); John Kerry (stepfather); Trump family

André Thierstein Heinz (born December 9, 1969) is an American environmentalist. The great-great-grandson of Henry J. Heinz, he is the son of John Heinz and Teresa Heinz.

== Biography ==
Heinz has been active in the field of sustainable development since 1993, when he began working for William McDonough, the noted green architect and designer, on sustainable design issues and projects. At the same time, Heinz joined the board of The Heinz Endowments, where he oversaw the creation of an environmental grant-making program through a series of 14 topical environmental colloquia that convened leaders from around the world. He continues to serve on the Endowments board and on its Joint Investment Committee, which oversees the management of the $1.5 billion endowment.

Following a six-month urban redevelopment project for the City of Pittsburgh, where he applied his knowledge together with colleagues at Carnegie Mellon University, Heinz began research for Paul Hawken on his latest book titled "Natural Capitalism." It chronicles examples of 75 percent or greater resource productivity at zero-to-negative cost, and suggests principles to help replicate those successes. Simultaneously, Heinz co-founded in 1995 the first U.S. office of The Natural Step, a Sweden-based nonprofit organization specialized in education and consulting around sustainable development.

In 1999, after receiving a masters in environmental management at the Yale School of Forestry and Environmental Studies, where he specialized in industrial environmental management and industrial ecology, Heinz accepted a job offer to run the international office of The Natural Step in Stockholm. In 2004, Heinz left The Natural Step to focus on U.S. presidential politics as a surrogate spokesperson specializing in environmental policy and issues. Since then, he has turned his attention yet again to Scandinavia as the founder of Sustainable Technology Capital, a growth-stage, private equity management firm focused on Nordic Cleantech.

=== Personal life ===
Heinz is a son of Henry John Heinz III, a U.S. Senator killed in a 1991 plane crash, and Maria Teresa Thierstein Simões-Ferreira, a businesswoman and philanthropist. He has a younger brother, Christopher, and an elder brother, John IV. His mother later married John Kerry, making Heinz a stepbrother of Alexandra Kerry and Vanessa Kerry.

Heinz married Maria Marteinsdottir in Sweden in August 2016
