= Phantom Corsair =

1938 prototype automobile

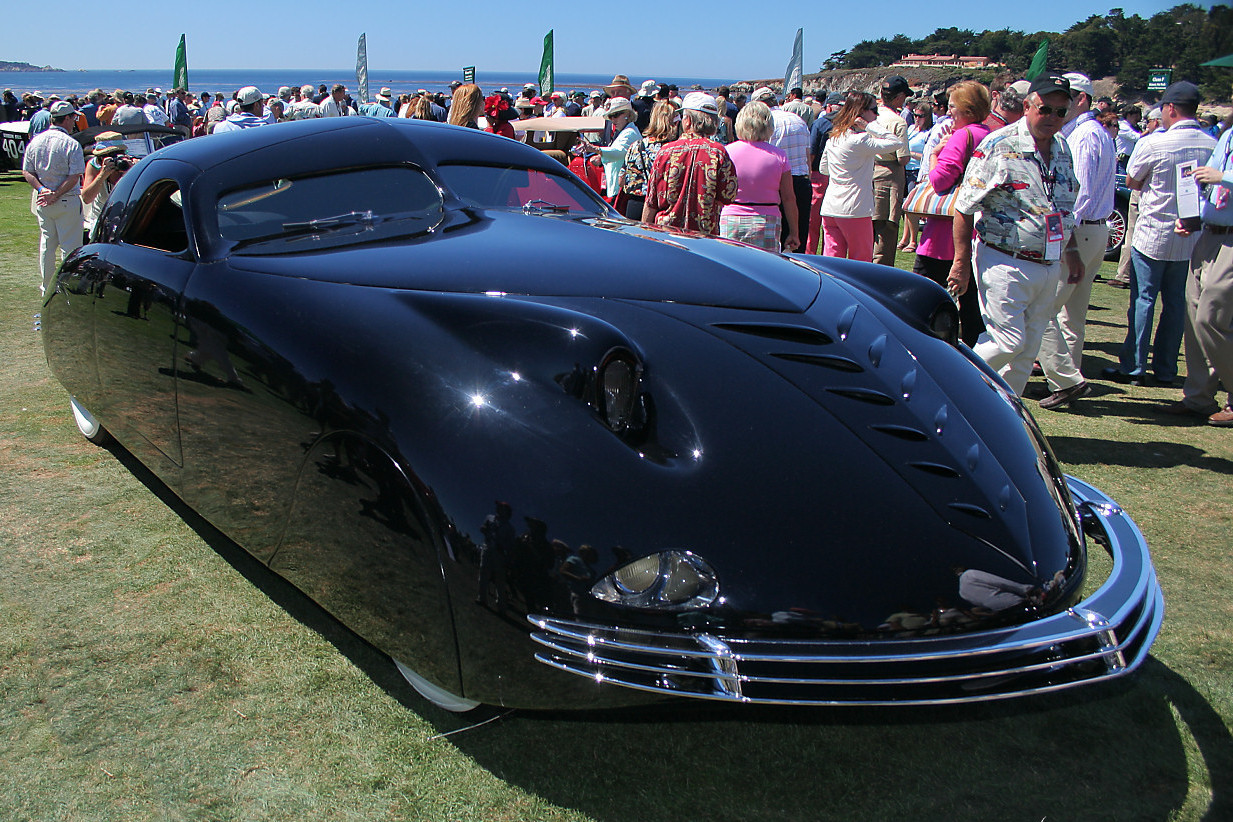

Overview
- Manufacturer: Rust Heinz; Maurice Schwartz
- Model years: 1938
- Assembly: Pasadena, California

Body and chassis
- Class: Mid-size prototype
- Body style: 2-door 5/6 seater sedan
- Layout: Front-mid-engine, front-wheel-drive layout
- Platform: Cord 810

Powertrain
- Engine: 4.7 L Lycoming (Cord) L-head V8 (Note: While according to Michael Lamm of Motor Trend the Phantom Corsair has a V8 engine, Mick Walsh of Classic & Sports Car writes that it has a straight-8 engine instead.)

Dimensions
- Wheelbase: 3,175 mm (125.0 in)
- Length: 6,020 mm (237.0 in)
- Width: 1,943 mm (76.5 in)
- Height: 1,448 mm (57.0 in)
- Curb weight: 2,070 kg (4,563.6 lb)

The Phantom Corsair is an American prototype automobile built in 1937. It is a six-passenger 2-door sedan that was designed by Rust Heinz of the H. J. Heinz family and Maurice Schwartz of the Bohman & Schwartz coachbuilding company in Pasadena, California. Although sometimes dismissed as a failure because it never entered production, the Corsair is regarded as ahead of its time because of its futuristic features, and styling cues such as faired-in fenders and a low profile.

It was shown to the local press in Pasadena in July 1937, and first exhibited publicly at the Ambassador Hotel in Los Angeles on 15 February 1938, with publicity including many construction details:

“Streamlined to the ultimate—underneath as well as above—the body of the car covers wheels and eliminates necessity for fenders or running boards and thus makes possible a longer seat on which four people ride abreast. A rumble seat accommodates two passengers who face the rear…With a body of electrically welded aviation steel tubing - and an outer surface of alloy steel - and a passenger compartment lined with rubber composition, passengers ride in a scientifically safe ‘steel cage.’ Electric push buttons replace door handles, while the hood raises by an automatic trigger on the instrument panel, automatically switching on an engine service light. Seats are of solid cast rubber, eliminating seat springs. There is a ‘crash board,’ padded with cork and sponge rubber and covered with leather to minimize injury in case of accident. Layers of cork and rubber latex applied to the entire body of the car kill vibration and rumble at its source and eliminate all normal highway and engine noises. Indirect lighting features the car's interior, while built-in headlights of enormous candlepower, with amber fog lights below, afford 180-degree highway illumination....The passenger section contains luxury compartments—one on either side of the rumble seat. There is an all-wave radio with twin speakers and an aviationtype aerial. Ceiling and sidewalls are lined with three-quarter inch light cork composition and layer of sponge rubber under upholstery of tufted design. The floor is acoustically treated with a layer of pulp composition, sprayed cork, rubber and floor carpet. Interior features are of dull finished chromium, and unprotruding. Air conditioning, which is additional, thermostatically controls cold and heat producing units.”

== Design ==
The Phantom Corsair's steel-and-aluminum body measured just 57 in (140 cm) in height and incorporated fully skirted wheels and completely flush fenders while forgoing running boards. The car also lacked door handles, as the doors were instead opened electrically using push-buttons located on the exterior and the instrument panel. The instrument panel also featured a compass and altimeter, while a separate console above the windshield indicated when a door was ajar or if the car's lights or radio were turned on. The Corsair's body was mated to the "most advanced chassis available in the United States" at that time, the Cord 810. The Lycoming 90º V-8 engine-powered Cord chassis also featured front-wheel drive and an electrically operated four-speed pre-selector gearbox, as well as fully independent suspension and adjustable shock absorbers. Though these features from the Cord 810 chassis were all retained on the Phantom Corsair, the chassis was modified in order to accommodate the Corsair's large body. The body measured an impressive 237 in (600 cm) long and 76.5 in (194 cm) wide, enough to accommodate four people in the front row, including one person to the left of the driver. The back seats could only hold two passengers, however, in large part because of space limitations posed by on-board beverage cabinets. Though weighing a hefty 4,600 lb (2,100 kg), the Phantom Corsair could achieve speeds of up to 115 mph (185 km/h) because of its modified, naturally aspirated 125 bhp Lycoming engine as well as its aerodynamic shape.

== Production ==
Rust Heinz planned to put the Phantom Corsair, which cost approximately $24,000 to produce in 1938 (equivalent to about $370,000 in 2010), into limited production at an estimated selling price of $12,500. However, Heinz's death in a car accident in July 1939 ended those plans, leaving the prototype Corsair as the only one ever built.

The Phantom Corsair now resides in the National Automobile Museum (also known as The Harrah Collection) in Reno, Nevada.

== Media appearances ==
- The automobile was featured as the "Flying Wombat" in the David O. Selznick film The Young in Heart (1938), starring Janet Gaynor, Douglas Fairbanks, Jr., Paulette Goddard, and Billie Burke.
- The Corsair was featured in a segment of the Popular Science film series in 1938.
- Versions of the Corsair (referred to as the "Manta") feature as unique unlockable vehicles in the 2002 video game Mafia and its 2020 remake.
- The Corsair is one of the 15 rare drivable vehicles featured in the 2011 video game L.A. Noire.

== Image gallery ==
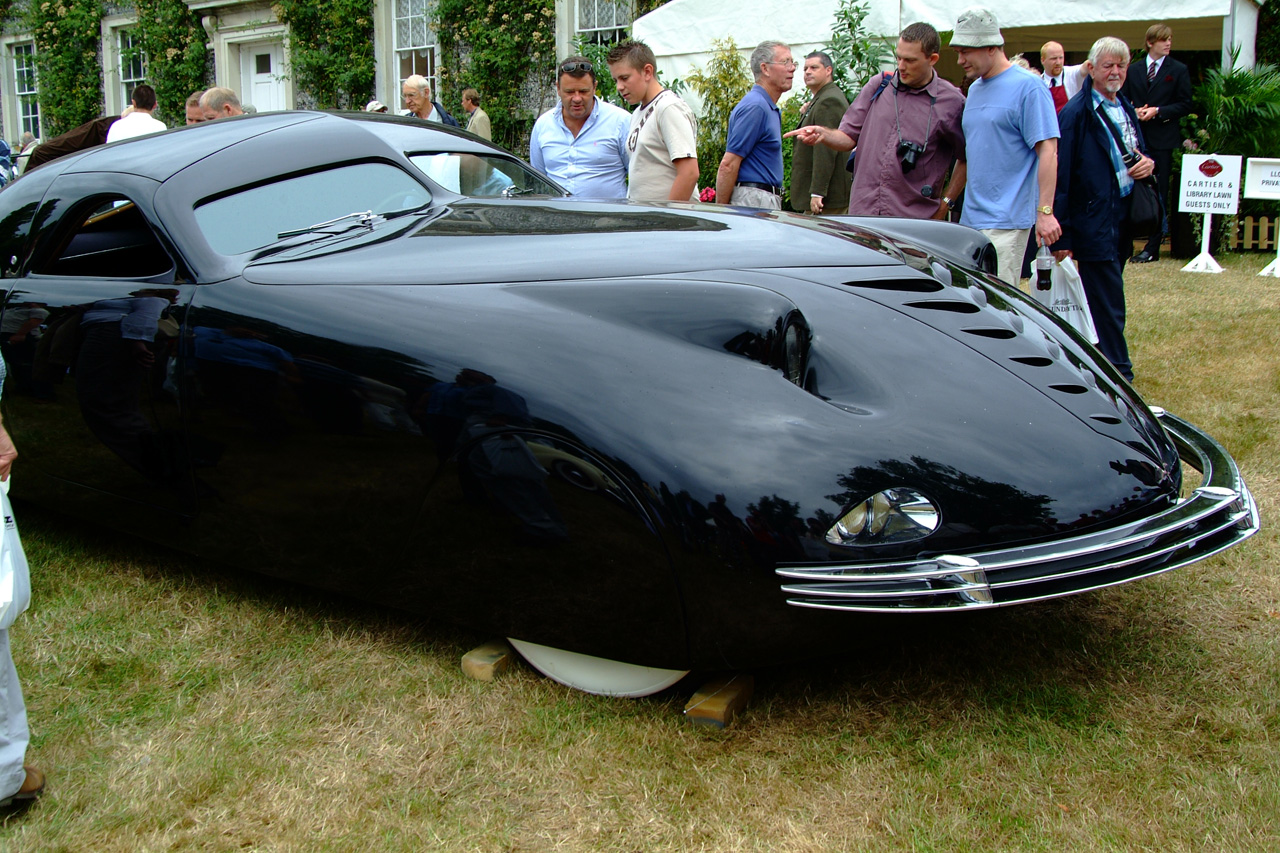
Side view, at the 2006 Goodwood Festival of Speed

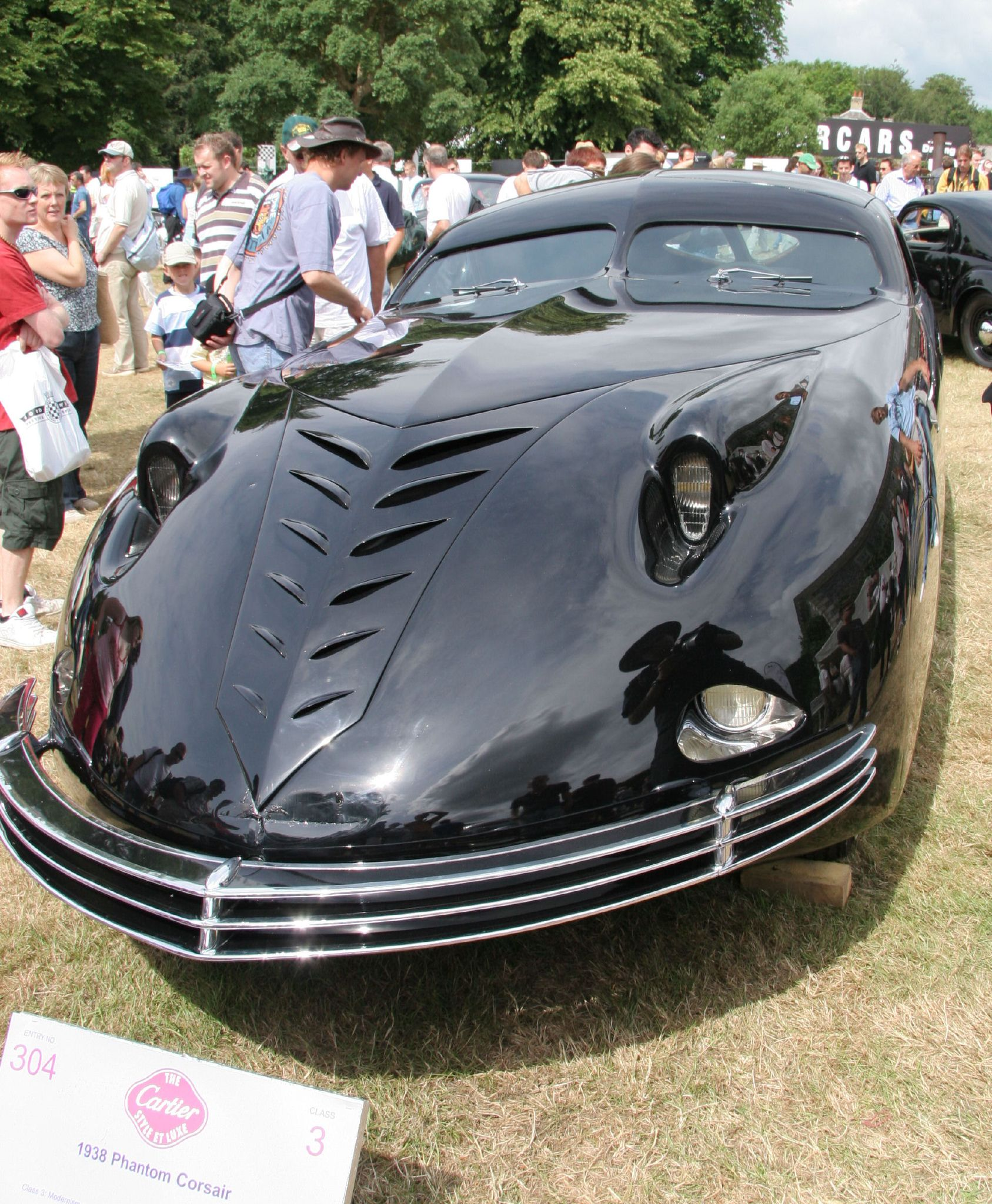
Front view, at the 2006 Goodwood Festival of Speed

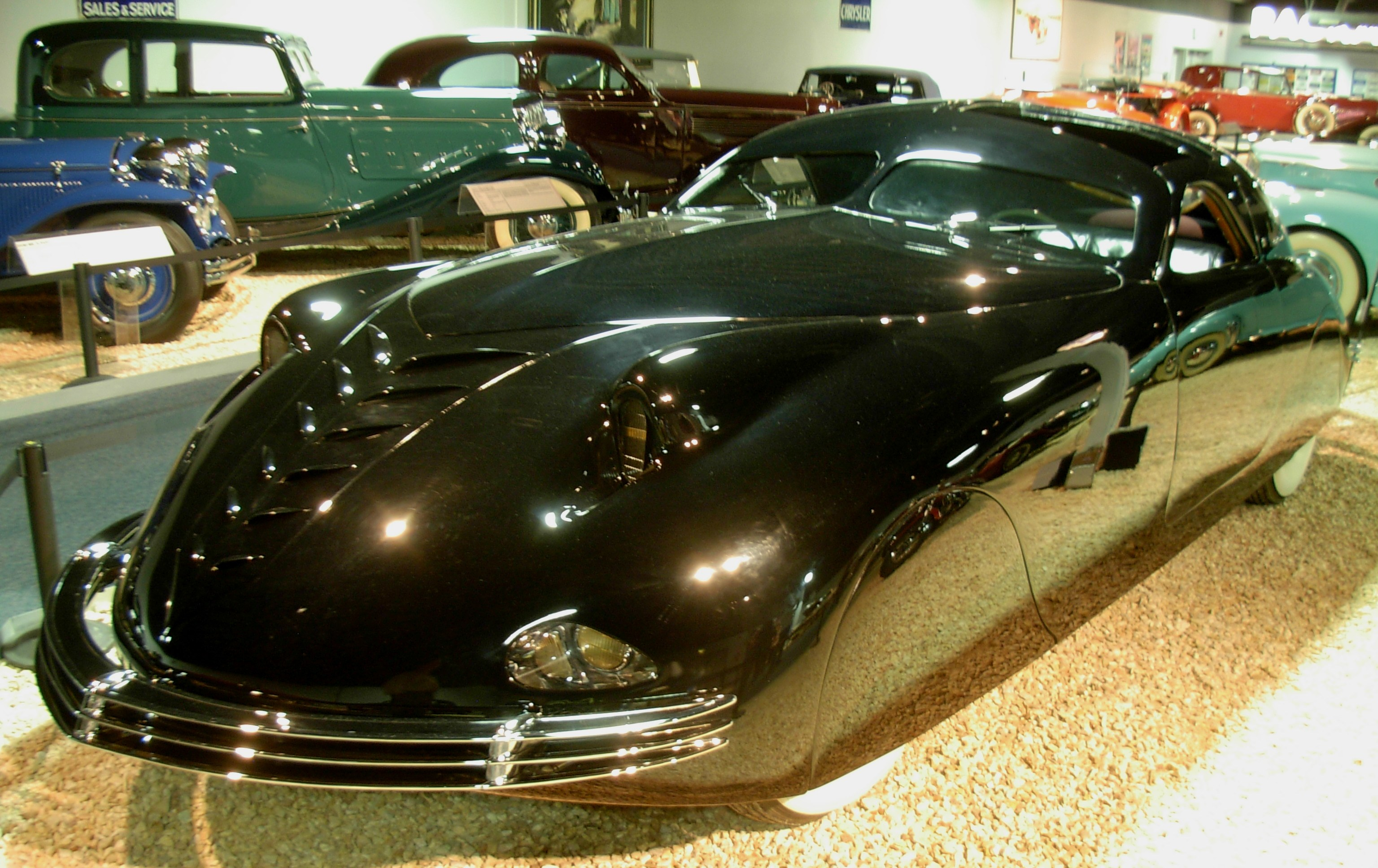
Side view, on museum display

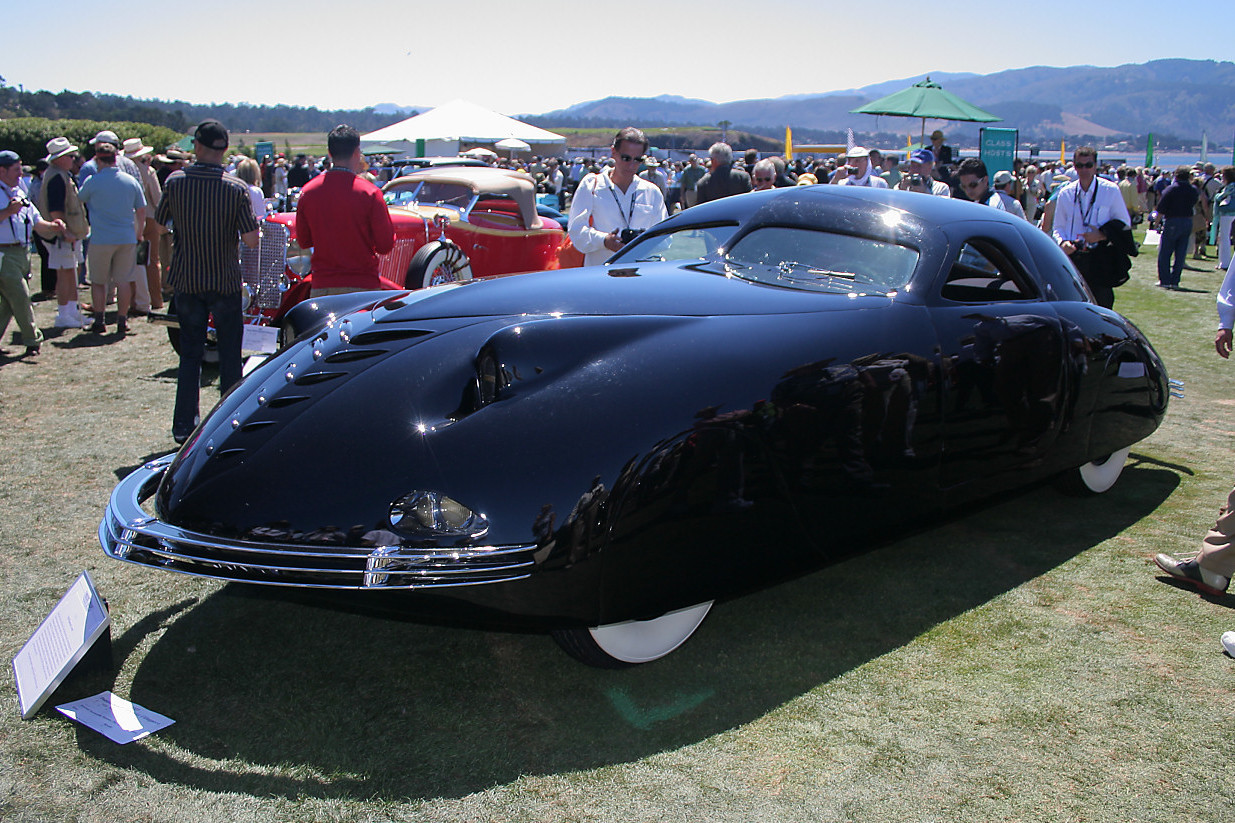
Side view, at the 2007 Pebble Beach Concours d'Elegance

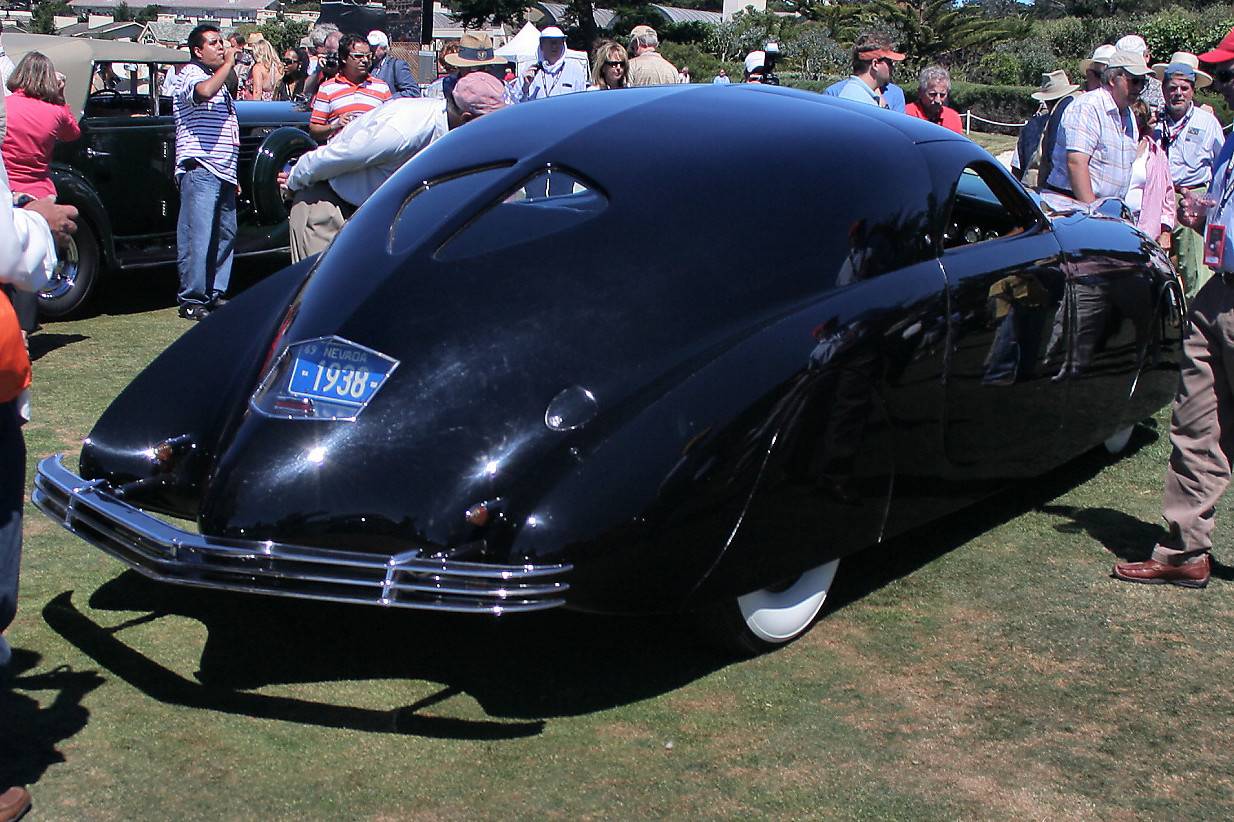
Rear view, at the 2007 Pebble Beach Concours d'Elegance
