= Drue Heinz =

American philanthropist of literature (1915–2018)

Drue Heinz DBE FRSL
- Heinz in 1955
- Born: Doreen Mary English; March 8, 1915; Norfolk, England
- Died: March 30, 2018 (aged 103); Lasswade, Midlothian, Scotland
- Other names: Doreen English; Drue Mallory
- Occupation: Philanthropist of literature
- Spouses: John Mackenzie Robertson; Dale Wilford Maher (m. 1946; died 1948) H. J. Heinz II (m. 1953; died 1987)

Doreen Mary Heinz DBE FRSL (née English; March 8, 1915 – March 30, 2018), known as Drue Heinz, was a British-born American actress, philanthropist, arts patron, and socialite. She was the publisher of the literary magazine The Paris Review (1993 to 2007), co-founded Ecco Press, founded literary retreats and endowed the Drue Heinz Literature Prize, among other initiatives. She was married to H. J. Heinz II, president of Heinz.

== Biography ==
Born Doreen Mary English in Norfolk, England, to Patrick Harry English, an army officer, and Edith English (née Wodehouse), she first married John Mackenzie Robertson, with whom she had one daughter, Wendy Mackenzie. Her second husband was Dale Wilford Maher, the first Secretary of the U. S. Legation in Johannesburg, South Africa (died 1948). They had a daughter Marigold Randall. In 1953, Drue became the third wife of H. J. Heinz II (1908–87), then president of Heinz company and heir to the Heinz fortune. She was the stepmother of John Heinz (1938–91), who later became a United States Senator from Pennsylvania.

Prior to her marriage to Heinz, she was an actress. As "Doreen English" she had a small role in the 1948 movie Uneasy Terms, which starred Michael Rennie. Using the name Drue Mallory, she was cast in three 1950 movies: Please Believe Me, starring Deborah Kerr, Three Came Home and Breakthrough.

The Heinz home in Pittsburgh was called "Goodwood", in Sewickley Heights. They also had an apartment in New York's Upper East Side and a winter retreat in Hobe Sound, Florida. For many years, their British home was Ascot Place at North Ascot in Winkfield, Berkshire. Heinz would buy houses, restore them and turn them into writers' retreats. She purchased Hawthornden Castle, a medieval fortress outside Edinburgh, Scotland and made it into a place for writers to live and work called the Hawthornden Literary Retreat. The Heinz Italian home, called Villa Maresi, was on Lake Como in the town of Griante. She called it "Casa Ecco", and writers would go there for discussions. "She was very close to Tom Wolfe, Norman Mailer, Andy Warhol, Harold Pinter and Antonia Fraser", according to Daniel Halpern, founder of Ecco Press.

Of her character, Heinz's daughter-in-law Teresa Heinz said: "Drue was a very private person but she came to know an amazing group of people in her life. She was smart and passionate and deeply interested in art, literature, and especially poetry." Of her reputation, Jonathan Galassi, president of Farrar, Straus and Giroux, said:

"Drue Heinz was the great literary philanthropist of our time. The institutions she created and/or supported – among them The Drue Heinz Prize, Antaeus, The Ecco Press and The Paris Review in the United States and the Hawthornden Prize and Hawthornden Castle in the U.K., to name only a few – are monuments to the seriousness and long-standing of her commitments; but it was her personal involvement, her long friendships with [James] Laughlin, George Plimpton, and countless writers and editors, that made her generosity so impactful."

Heinz died on March 30, 2018, at the age of 103, at Hawthornden Castle in Lasswade, Scotland.

== Philanthropic and literary career ==
In 1971, with the encouragement of her friend James Laughlin, Heinz co-founded Ecco Press. In addition to the literary magazine Antaeus, which she funded from 1970 to its closing in 1994, Ecco published many out-of-print books, and was one of the leading US publishers of poetry.

Heinz began supporting the University of Pittsburgh's fiction prize in 1980. In 1995, she endowed the prize with a $1 million gift, at which point it became known as the Drue Heinz Literature Prize. The prize publishes collections of short fiction through the University of Pittsburgh Press. "The revenue from that million has exceeded the needs of the press for publication and promotion of the Heinz books so it keeps growing," said Ed Ochester, editor of the press in 2018. Heinz also endowed the Hawthornden Prize for many years.

When the archives of The Paris Review were sold to the Morgan Library in 1999, Heinz paid the purchase price of $850,000. Heinz was close friends with the founder, George Plimpton, and was herself publisher of the Review from 1993 to 2007. Heinz was among those who helped found the paper in 1953 and over the years help fund it.

In 1970, she restored an old movie theater in Pittsburgh into the Heinz Hall for the Performing Arts, which was the founding institution of what would later become the Cultural District. Heinz gave $10 million to Carnegie Institute for the creation of the Heinz Architectural Center in 1990. Heinz also supported London's Tate Gallery and the Royal Institute of British Architects. Funds from her foundation help publish the Lincoln Center Theater Review.

She was the sponsor of The Royal Oak Foundation's Drue Heinz Lecture Series and served as the Foundation's Honorary Chairman. In 2002, Heinz endowed a chair jointly held at St. John's College, Oxford, and the Rothermere American Institute, University of Oxford, called the Drue Heinz Professor of American Literature. She endowed the position of the Drue Heinz Librarian at the American Academy in Rome. She sponsored the Literary Evenings, Monday Night Lecture Series produced by Pittsburgh Arts & Lectures in Pittsburgh, Pennsylvania, and the Drue Heinz Study Center for Drawings and Prints at the National Design Museum. She was on the board of the Metropolitan Museum of Art, the MacDowell Colony, the Pierpont Morgan Library, the American Academy in Rome and served on the International Council of the Museum of Modern Art. She joined the board of the Howard Heinz Endowment in 1973, which later became the Heinz Endowments, and became director emeritus in 1994. She was also a board member of the Carnegie Museum of Art.

Her private foundation, the Drue Heinz Trust, had assets of $36 million according to its 2015 tax return.

== Awards and honors ==
Heinz was named an Honorary Dame Commander of The Most Excellent Order of the British Empire in July 1995. In 2002, Heinz was selected as an Honorary Fellow of the Royal Society of Literature. She was an Honorary Fellow of Hertford College, Oxford.
