= Christopher Heinz =

American businessman

- Born: 1973 (age 52–53)
- Occupations: Businessman, manager
- Spouse: Alexandra Lewis
- Children: 2
- Parents: John Heinz; Teresa Heinz
- Relatives: Andre Heinz (brother); John Kerry (stepfather); Trump family

Christopher Drake Heinz (born 1973) is an American businessman and investment manager. He is an heir to the billionaire fortune from the family food company Heinz.

== Family ==
Chris Heinz is the youngest son of United States Senator Henry John Heinz III (d. 1991) and Teresa Heinz Kerry. He is the great-great-grandson of the industrialist and founder of the H.J. Heinz Co. He has two brothers, H. John Heinz IV (born November 4, 1966) and Andre Heinz. He and his brothers served on the board of The Heinz Endowments chaired by their mother. His father was killed in the 1991 mid-air collision of a helicopter and plane (Merion air disaster).

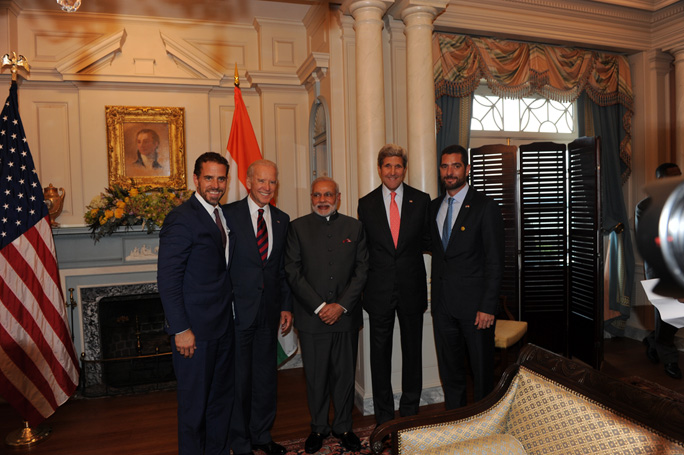
30 September 2014: Vice President Biden and Secretary of State Kerry host a luncheon for the Indian Prime Minister. From left: Hunter Biden, his father US Vice President Biden, Indian Prime Minister Narendra Modi, US Secretary of State Kerry and his stepson Christopher Heinz

Chris Heinz is a stepson of the former United States Secretary of State John Kerry, and stepbrother of Alexandra Kerry and Vanessa Kerry. Heinz married Alexandra Lewis in February 2007. They have two children.

== Career ==
In 2004 when his stepfather John Kerry, was the Democratic nominee for president of the United States, Heinz quit his job working as a venture capitalist to work as a fundraiser and surrogate speaker for Kerry's campaign. Heinz worked on his stepfather's presidential campaign, and spoke at the 2004 Democratic National Convention where he was considered a plausible candidate for a 2006 seat in the U.S. Congress. In 2005, he co-founded Rosemont Capital (named for the family's Fox Chapel property near Pittsburgh) until departing in 2014. He was a partner in the Washington, D.C. firm Rosemont Seneca from its founding in 2009 until 2014, when he ended his working relationship with Hunter Biden and Devon Archer, after Biden and Archer took board positions on Burisma Holdings (a privat Ukrainian fracking gas company), which was owned by Ukrainian oligarchs Ihor Kolomoyskyi and Mykola Zlochevsky, the former Minister of Ecology and Natural Resources. Biden’s father was then serving as vice president and had been made the point man on Ukraine after February 2014 by the Obama administration. 2014, Zlochevsky fled Ukraine amid allegations of unlawful self enrichment and legalization of funds during his tenure in public office.

In 2015, he relocated to Pittsburgh.

He has served on the board of the Navy SEAL Foundation. He is a former member of the Council on Foreign Relations.
