= John Heinz =

American businessman and politician (1938–1991)

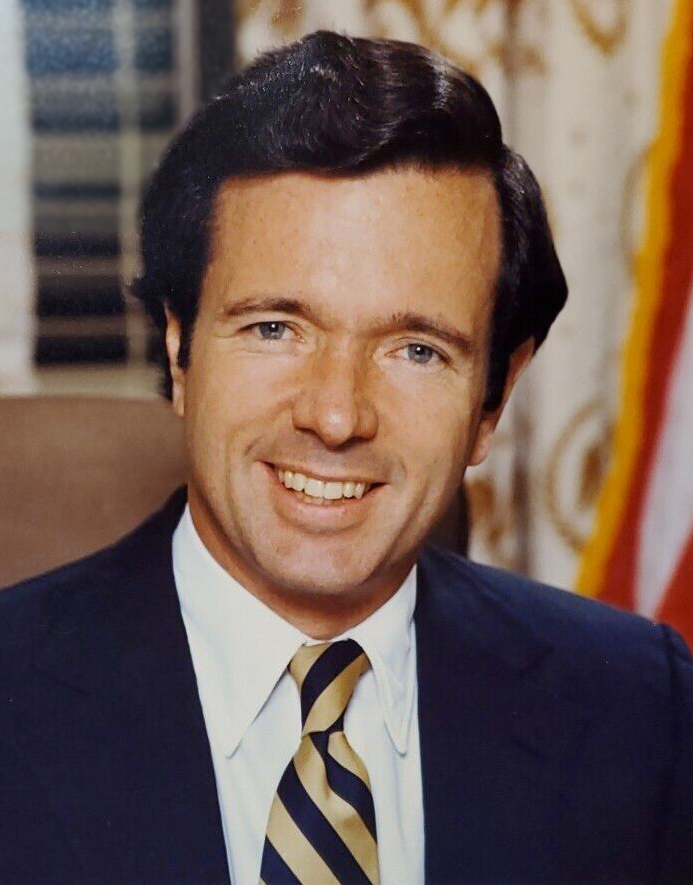

United States Senator from Pennsylvania
- In office January 3, 1977 – April 4, 1991
- Preceded by: Hugh Scott
- Succeeded by: Harris Wofford
Committee positions
Chair of the Senate Aging Committee
In office January 3, 1981 – January 3, 1987
Preceded by	Lawton Chiles
Succeeded by	John Melcher
Chair of the National Republican Senatorial Committee
In office January 3, 1985 – January 3, 1987
Leader	Bob Dole
Preceded by	Richard Lugar
Succeeded by	Rudy Boschwitz
In office January 3, 1979 – January 3, 1981
Leader	Howard Baker
Preceded by	Bob Packwood
Succeeded by	Bob Packwood

Member of the U.S. House of Representatives from Pennsylvania's 18th district
- In office November 2, 1971 – January 3, 1977
- Preceded by: Robert Corbett
- Succeeded by: Doug Walgren

Personal details
- Born: Henry John Heinz III; October 23, 1938 Pittsburgh, Pennsylvania, U.S.
- Died: April 4, 1991 (aged 52) Lower Merion Township, Pennsylvania, U.S.
- Cause of death: Plane crash
- Resting place: Homewood Cemetery
- Party: Republican
- Spouse: Teresa Simões-Ferreira (m. 1966)
- Children: 3, including André and Christopher
- Parent: Jack Heinz (father)
- Relatives: Henry J. Heinz (great-grandfather); Drue English (stepmother); Trump family
- Education: Yale University (BA); Harvard University (MBA)

Military service
- Allegiance: United States
- Branch: U.S. Air Force (Reserves)
- Service years: 1963–1969

Henry John Heinz III (October 23, 1938 – April 4, 1991) was an American businessman and politician who served as a United States senator from Pennsylvania from 1977 until his death in 1991. An heir to the Heinz family fortune, Heinz entered politics in 1971 when he won a special election to replace Robert Corbett to represent Pennsylvania's 18th congressional district. In 1976, Heinz ran to replace retiring Senate Minority Leader Hugh Scott. Heinz narrowly won in the Republican primary over future Senator Arlen Specter and defeated William Green III in the general election. Heinz won re-election in 1982 and 1988 by large margins. On April 4, 1991, Heinz was killed when his plane, facing mechanical problems, collided with a helicopter inspecting the plane, killing all involved in the crash.

== Early life and education ==
Henry John Heinz III was born on October 23, 1938, in Pittsburgh, Pennsylvania, the only child of Joan (Diehl) and H. J. "Jack" Heinz II, heir to the H. J. Heinz Company. His parents divorced in 1942. Heinz moved to San Francisco, California, with his mother and stepfather, U.S. Navy Captain Clayton Chot "Monty" McCauley. Although he was raised and primarily resided in San Francisco throughout his childhood, Heinz often spent the summer months with his father in Pittsburgh.

In 1956, Heinz graduated from Phillips Exeter Academy. He then attended and graduated from Yale University, where Theodore Stebbins was his roommate, in 1960, majoring in history, arts and letters. Heinz subsequently graduated from Harvard Business School in 1963. As a Harvard Business School student, he met his future wife, Teresa Simões Ferreira, who attended the University of Geneva, over summer break.

He was a fourth cousin of 45th and 47th U.S. President Donald Trump (their great-grandfathers were first cousins and originated from Kallstadt, Germany).

== Career ==
=== U.S. Air Force ===
After graduating from the Harvard Business School in 1963, Heinz served in the United States Air Force Reserve and was on active duty during the same year. He remained in the Air Force Reserve until 1969.

=== Political career ===
Heinz served as an assistant to Pennsylvania Republican U.S. Senator Hugh Scott and played an active role as assistant campaign manager during Scott's campaign for re-election. Heinz then worked in the financial and marketing division of the H. J. Heinz Company between 1965 and 1970, after which he taught business at the Carnegie Mellon University's Graduate School of Industrial Administration until 1971.

==== U.S. House of Representatives ====
In 1971, Heinz entered politics after Representative Robert Corbett, who represented Pennsylvania's 18th congressional district, died in office. After winning the Republican primary, Heinz won the special election on November 2, 1971, to fill the vacancy created by Corbett's death. Heinz was re-elected to the U.S. House of Representatives in 1972 and 1974. During his tenure, he cultivated a moderate record in the vein of Pennsylvania's two Republican senators Hugh Scott and Richard Schweiker. Also in 1974, he declined to challenge Democratic governor Milton Schapp.

==== U.S. Senate ====
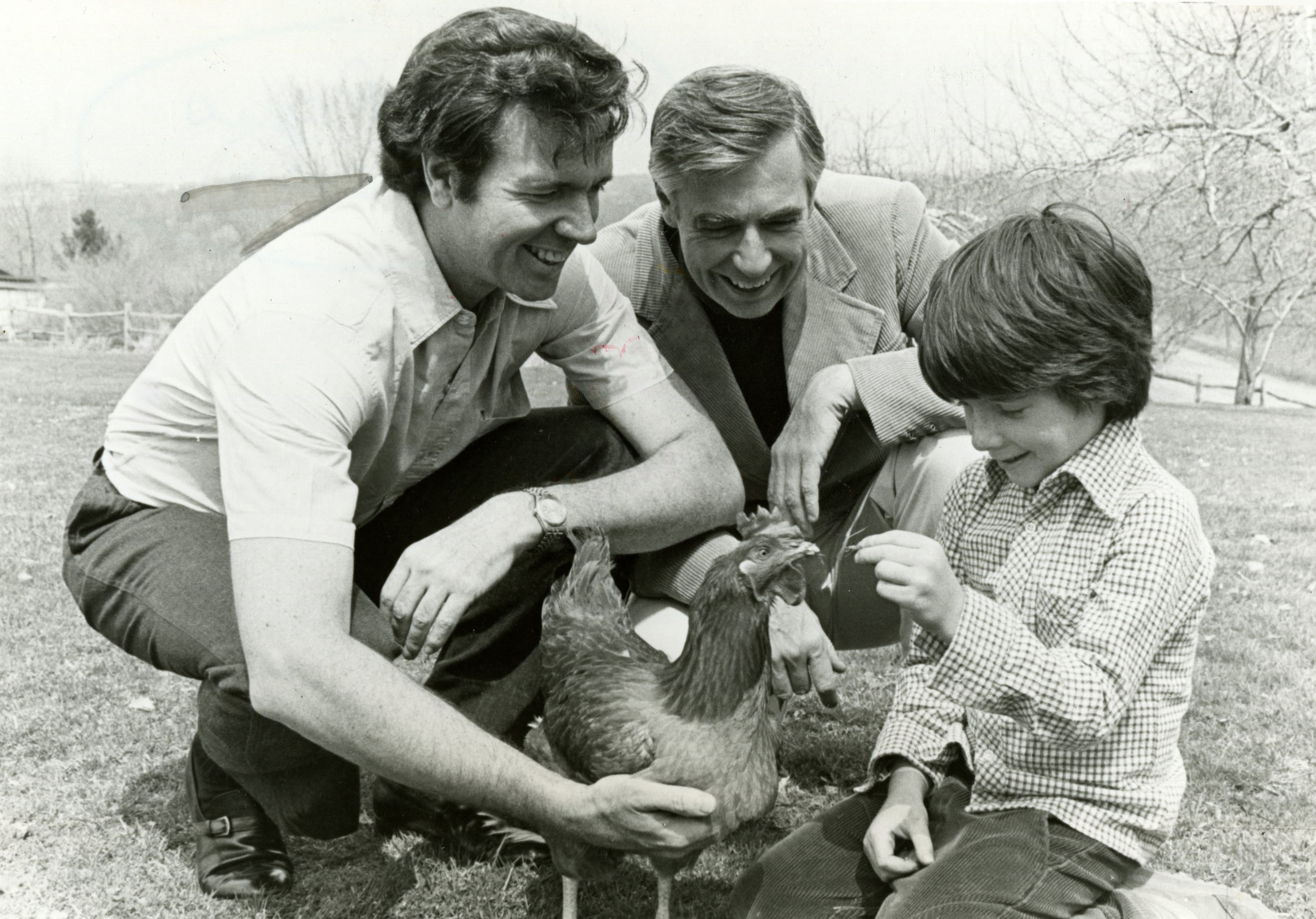
Heinz, his son Chris, and Fred Rogers

Heinz opted not to run for re-election to his seat in the House of Representatives, announcing on December 10, 1975 to run for Pennsylvania's open United States Senate seat created by the retirement of incumbent Hugh Scott. In the primary, Heinz faced opposition from Arlen Specter. During the campaign, the Supreme Court issued a ruling in Buckley v. Valeo, allowing candidates to spend with few restrictions, benefitting Heinz. During the campaign, Heinz came under fire for having accepted illegal donations totaling $6,000 from Gulf Oil, which Heinz returned, claimed was an accident and denied legal culpability. Heinz would defeat Specter in the primary, performing strongly in western Pennsylvania. Heinz faced congressman William Green III in the general election. Heinz was criticized by Green for his wealth and spending. Heinz defeated Green in November. He was subsequently re-elected in 1982 and in 1988.

In the Senate, Heinz was a moderate-to-liberal Republican. He was a member of the Committee on Banking, Housing, and Urban Affairs, the Committee on Finance, the National Commission on Social Security Reform, the National Commission on Health Care Reform, the Northeast Coalition, and the Steel Caucus. He also served as chairman of the Subcommittee on International Finance and Monetary Policies, the Special Committee on Aging, and the Republican Conference Task Force on Job Training and Education.

Heinz voted in favor of the bill establishing Martin Luther King Jr. Day as a federal holiday and the Civil Rights Restoration Act of 1987 (as well as to override President Reagan's veto). Heinz voted in favor of the Robert Bork Supreme Court nomination.

He was elected chairman of the National Republican Senatorial Committee for two terms, 1979–1981 and 1985–1987.

The New York Times noted that Heinz built a solid record in the Senate as "a persistent defender of the nation's growing elderly population and of the declining steel industry", that he was "instrumental in pushing through legislation that put the Social Security system on sounder financial footing", and "played a major role in strengthening laws regulating retirement policies, pension plans, health insurance and nursing homes", and "pushed successfully for trade laws that encourage American exports and protect American products, like steel, from foreign imports".

In 1991, Heinz began evaluating a Pennsylvania gubernatorial bid, with advisors thinking it was a move towards a future bid for the White House.

== Death ==
On April 4, 1991, Heinz and six other people, including two children, were killed when a Sun Co. Aviation Department Bell 412 helicopter and a Piper Aerostar, with Heinz aboard, collided in mid-air above Merion Elementary School in Lower Merion Township, Pennsylvania. All aboard both aircraft, as well as two children at the school, were killed. The helicopter was attempting to investigate a problem with the landing gear of Heinz's plane, and while moving in for a closer look, collided with the plane, causing both aircraft to lose control and crash. The subsequent NTSB investigation attributed the cause of the crash to poor judgment by the pilots of the two aircraft involved.

Following a funeral at Heinz Chapel in Pittsburgh and a Washington, D.C. memorial service that was attended by President George H. W. Bush and Vice President Dan Quayle, Senator Heinz's remains were interred in the Heinz family mausoleum in Homewood Cemetery, located in the Point Breeze neighborhood of Pittsburgh, Pennsylvania.

Heinz's long time friend, Senator Tim Wirth of Colorado, remarked: "He really believed he could make the world a better place, such a contrast to the jaded resignation of our time. He could send the Senate leadership up a wall faster than anyone I've seen." Heinz's son André said at the services: "Dad, I am so grateful for the time we had, and I miss you and I love you."

In 1995, Teresa, Heinz's widow, married Heinz's Senate colleague, future Democratic presidential nominee and Secretary of State John Kerry.

== Legacy ==
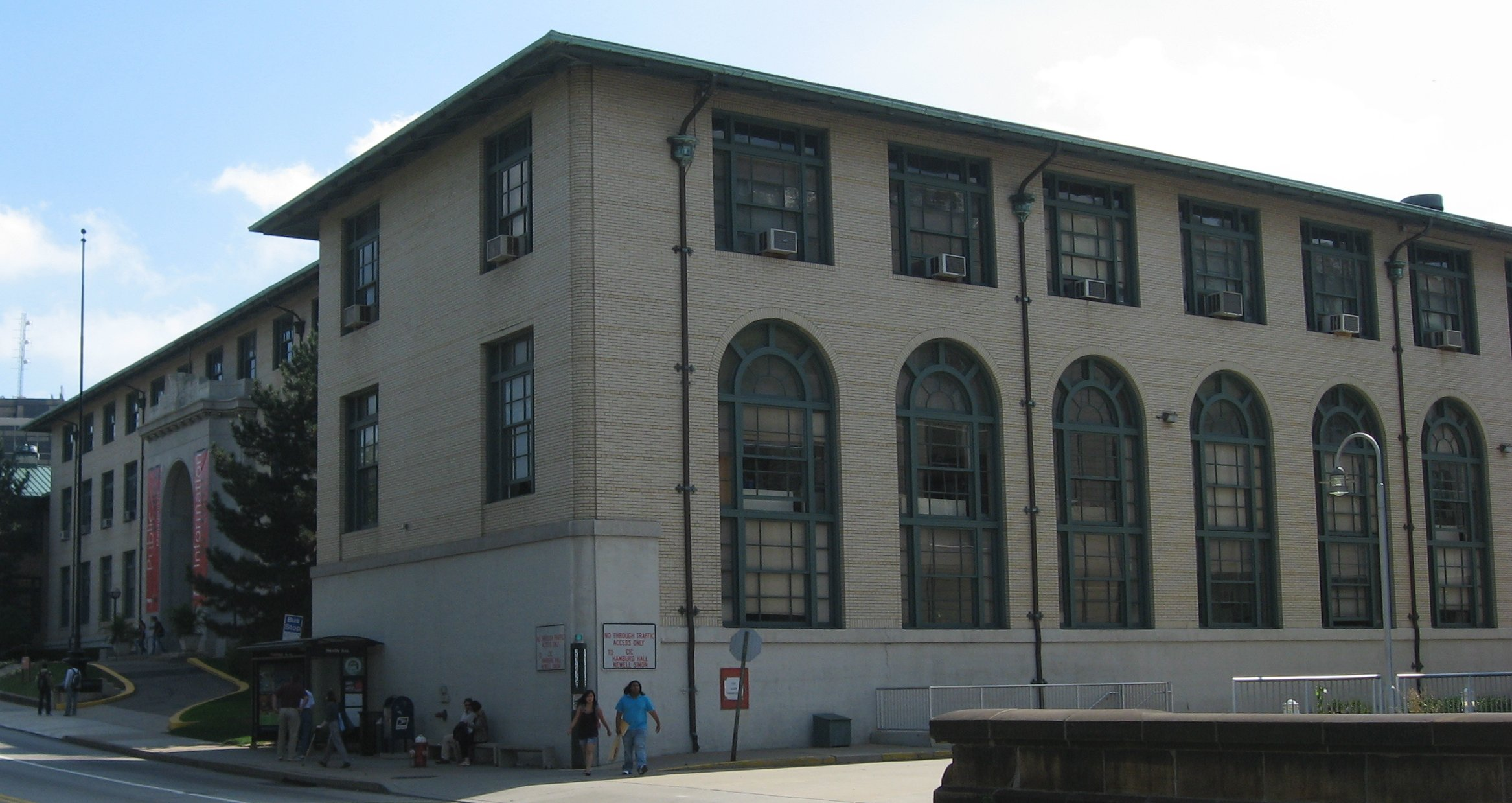
Heinz College at Carnegie Mellon University in Pittsburgh

The Tinicum Wildlife Preserve was renamed to the John Heinz National Wildlife Refuge at Tinicum in Heinz's honor following his death. The 1,200 acre (4.9 km^{2}) refuge includes the largest remaining freshwater tidal marsh in Pennsylvania, as well as other habitats that are home to a variety of plants and animals native to Southeastern Pennsylvania.

Heinz was elected to the American Philosophical Society in 1991.

In 1993, his family established the Heinz Awards, which honors individual innovation in five categories. One of the Jefferson Awards for Public Service annual awards, for "Greatest Public Service by an Elected or Appointed Official", is named in his honor.

Several institutions bear his name, including:

- Senator H. John Heinz III Archives at the Carnegie Mellon University Libraries in Pittsburgh
- Heinz College at Carnegie Mellon University in Pittsburgh
- H. John Heinz III Center for Science, Economics and the Environment in Washington, D.C.
- Heinz History Center in Pittsburgh
- H. J. Heinz Campus of the U.S. Department of Veterans Affairs Pittsburgh Healthcare System in Pittsburgh

== Electoral history ==
U.S. House special election, 1971
Party	Candidate	Votes	%	±%
Republican	H. John Heinz III	103,543	66.6	
Democratic	John E. Connelly	49,269	31.7	
Constitution	John E. Backman	2,737	1.7	

1976 Republican primary results
Party	Candidate	Votes	%	±%
Republican	H. John Heinz, III	358,715	37.73	
Republican	Arlen Specter	332,513	34.98	
Republican	George Packard	160,379	16.87	
Republican	Others	99,074	10.43	

U.S. Senate election results, 1976
Party	Candidate	Votes	%	±%
Republican	H. John Heinz III	2,381,891	52.39	
Democratic	William J. Green III	2,126,977	46.79	
Constitution	Andrew J. Watson	26,028	0.57	
Socialist Workers	Frederick W. Stanton	5,484	0.12	
Labor Party	Bernard Salera	3,637	0.08	
Communist Party	Frank Kinces	2,097	0.05	

Pennsylvania United States Senate Election, 1982
Party	Candidate	Votes	%	±%
Republican	H. John Heinz III (Incumbent)	2,136,418	59.28	
Democratic	Cyril Wecht	1,412,965	39.20	
Libertarian	Barbara I. Karkutt	19,244	0.53	
Socialist Workers	William H. Thomas	18,951	0.53	
Consumer	Liane Norman	16,530	0.46	
Majority		723,453	20.08	
Turnout		3,604,108		
Republican hold		Swing		

Pennsylvania United States Senate Election, 1988
Party	Candidate	Votes	%	±%
Republican	H. John Heinz III (Incumbent)	2,901,715	66.45	
Democratic	Joseph Vignola	1,416,764	32.45	
Consumer	Darcy Richardson	25,273	0.58	
Libertarian	Henry E. Haller II	11,822	0.27	
Populist	Samuel Cross	6,455	0.15	
New Alliance	Sam Blancato	4,569	0.11	
Majority		1,484,951	34.00	
Turnout		4,366,598		
Republican hold		Swing		

== See also ==
- List of members of the United States Congress who died in office (1950–1999)

U.S. House of Representatives
Preceded by Robert Corbett	Member of the U.S. House of Representatives from Pennsylvania's 18th congressional district 1971–1977	Succeeded by Doug Walgren
U.S. Senate
Preceded by Hugh Scott	U.S. senator (Class 1) from Pennsylvania; 1977–1991; Served alongside: Richard Schweiker and Arlen Specter	Succeeded by Harris Wofford
Party political offices
Preceded by Robert Packwood; Oregon	Chairman of the National Republican Senatorial Committee; 1979–1981	Succeeded by Robert Packwood; Oregon
Preceded by Richard Lugar; Indiana	Chairman of the National Republican Senatorial Committee; 1985–1987	Succeeded by Rudy Boschwitz; Minnesota
Preceded by Hugh Scott	Republican nominee for U.S. Senator from Pennsylvania (Class 1); 1976, 1982, 1988	Succeeded by Dick Thornburgh
Political offices
Preceded by Lawton Chiles; Florida	Chairman of the Senate Aging Committee; 1981–1987	Succeeded by John Melcher; Montana
