= 1976 United States Senate election in Pennsylvania =

- November 2, 1976
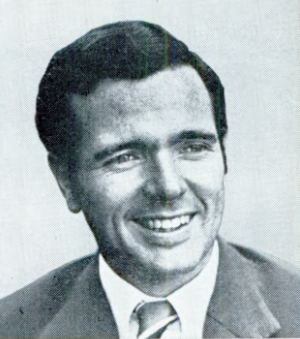

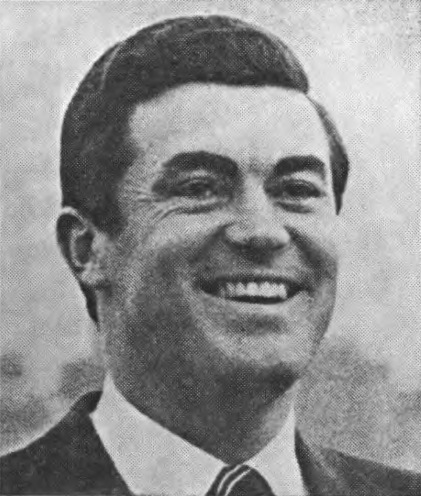
Nominee	John Heinz	Bill Green
Party	Republican	Democratic
Popular vote	2,381,891	2,126,977
Percentage	52.39%	46.79%
- County results Heinz: 50–60% 60–70% Green: 40–50% 50–60% 70–80%
U.S. senator before election
Hugh Scott
Republican
Elected U.S. Senator
John Heinz
Republican

The 1976 United States Senate election in Pennsylvania was held on November 2, 1976. Incumbent Republican U.S. Senator and Minority Leader Hugh Scott decided to retire. Republican John Heinz won the open seat.

== Background ==
In December 1975, U.S. senator Hugh Scott announced that he would not seek re-election in 1976 at the age of 75 after serving in Congress for 32 years. Scott listed personal reasons and several "well-qualified potential candidates" for the seat among the reasons of his decision to retire. Other reasons, including his support for Richard Nixon and accusations that he had illegally obtained contributions from Gulf Oil were alleged to have contributed to the decision.

== Republican primary ==
=== Candidates ===
- C. Homer Brown
- Mary Ellen Foltz
- John Heinz, U.S. Representative from Pittsburgh since 1971
- George Packard, former managing editor of the Philadelphia Bulletin
- Arlen Specter, former District Attorney of Philadelphia
- Francis Worley, former State Representative from Adams County

=== Results ===
Republican primary results
Party	Candidate	Votes	%
Republican	H. John Heinz III	358,715	37.73%
Republican	Arlen Specter	332,513	34.98%
Republican	George Packard	160,379	16.87%
Republican	C. Homer Brown	46,828	4.93%
Republican	Mary Ellen Foltz	29,160	3.07%
Republican	Francis Worley	20,421	2.15%
Write-in		2,665	0.28%
Total votes		950,681	100.00%

== Democratic primary ==
=== Candidates ===
- Bill Green, U.S. Representative from Philadelphia
- Jeanette Reibman, State Senator from Easton

=== Results ===
Democratic primary results
Party	Candidate	Votes	%
Democratic	William J. Green III	762,733	68.71%
Democratic	Jeanette Reibman	345,264	31.10%
Write-in		2,058	0.19%
Total votes		1,110,055	100.00%

== General election ==
=== Candidates ===
- William Green, U.S. Representative from Philadelphia (Democratic)
- John Heinz, U.S. Representative from Pittsburgh (Republican)
- Frank Kinces (Communist)
- Bernard Salera (Labor)
- Frederick W. Stanton (Socialist Workers)
- Andrew J. Watson (Constitution)

=== Campaign ===
Heinz was the victor in all but nine counties, defeating opponent William Green, who had a 300,000 vote advantage in his native Philadelphia area. Heinz and Green spent $2.5 million and $900,000, respectively, during the ten-month campaign. Much of the money Heinz spent on his campaign was his own, leading to accusations from Green that he was "buying the seat". Heinz replied to this by claiming that the spending was necessary to overcome the Democratic voter registration advantage.

=== Results ===
1976 U.S. Senate election in Pennsylvania
Party	Candidate	Votes	%	±%
Republican	H. John Heinz III	2,381,891	52.39%	▲0.96
Democratic	William J. Green III	2,126,977	46.79%	▲1.41
Constitution	Andrew J. Watson	26,028	0.57%	▼1.79
Socialist Workers	Frederick W. Stanton	5,484	0.12%	▲0.01
Labor Party	Bernard Salera	3,637	0.08%	▲0.08
Communist Party	Frank Kinces	2,097	0.05%	▲0.05
N/A	Other	239	0.00%	N/A
Total votes		4,546,353	100.00%	
Republican hold		Swing		

==== Results by county ====
County	H. John Heinz III Republican		William J. Green III Democratic		Various candidates Other parties		Margin		Total votes cast
County	#	%	#	%	#	%	#	%	Total votes cast
Allegheny
Armstrong
Beaver
Butler
Clarion
Fayette
Forest
Greene
Indiana
Lawrence
Venango
Washington
Westmoreland
Totals	2,381,891	52.39%	2,126,977	46.79%	37,246	0.82%	254,914	0.22%	4,546,353

== See also ==
- 1976 United States Senate elections
