= Robert Burt Gookin =

American businessman

- Born: 23 June 1914 (age 112)
- Education: Northwestern University; Harvard University
- Occupation: Former CEO of H.J. Heinz
- Years active: 34

Robert Burt Gookin (23 June 1914 – 21 December 2002) was the first CEO of the H. J. Heinz Company from outside the Heinz family. He joined the firm in 1945 and retired in 1979.
