= Teresa Heinz =

American businesswoman and philanthropist (born 1938)

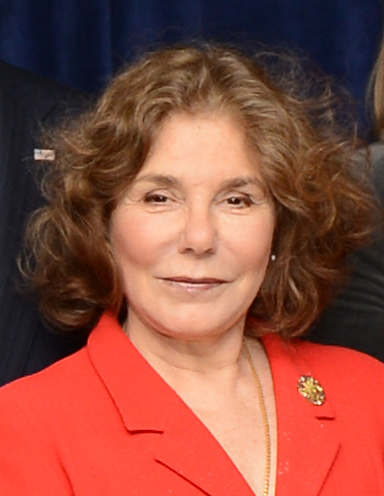
- Heinz in 2013
- Born: Maria Teresa Thierstein Simões-Ferreira; October 5, 1938 (age 88); Lourenço Marques, Portuguese East Africa
- Other name: Teresa Heinz Kerry
- Education: University of the Witwatersrand (BA); University of Geneva, School of Translation and Interpretation (MA)
- Occupations: Businesswoman, philanthropist
- Political party: Democratic (since 2003); Republican (until 2003)
- Spouses: John Heinz (m. 1966; died 1991) John Kerry (m. 1995)
- Children: 3, including André and Christopher
- Relatives: Trump family (from first marriage)

Teresa Heinz (born Maria Teresa Thierstein Simões-Ferreira; October 5, 1938), also known as Teresa Heinz Kerry, is a Portuguese-American businesswoman and philanthropist. Heinz is the widow of former U.S. Senator John Heinz and the current wife of former U.S. Secretary of State, longtime U.S. Senator and 2004 Democratic presidential nominee John Kerry. Heinz has served as chair of the Heinz Endowments and the Heinz Family Philanthropies.

== Early life, family, and education ==
Maria Teresa Thierstein Simões-Ferreira was born in the city of Lourenço Marques (later renamed Maputo) in the east African colony of Portuguese Mozambique, which later became the nation of Mozambique. Her parents were José Simões-Ferreira Jr., a Portuguese-born oncologist and tropical disease specialist, and Irene Thierstein, a Portuguese and British national. Irene Thierstein's father was the scion of a Swiss-German family living in Malta, and her mother was the half-French, half-Italian daughter of an Alexandrian shipowner who traded with Russia during the Crimean War; both emigrated to Portuguese East Africa. Simões-Ferreira was raised Roman Catholic.

In 1960, Simões-Ferreira earned a Bachelor of Arts in Romance Languages and Literature from the University of the Witwatersrand, Johannesburg, South Africa. In 1963, she graduated from the School of Translation and Interpretation at the University of Geneva; after her graduation, she moved to the United States to be an interpreter at the United Nations.

== Personal life ==
In addition to Portuguese (her native language), Heinz speaks English, Spanish, French, and Italian. She is Roman Catholic.

=== Marriages and children ===
On February 5, 1966, at Pittsburgh, Pennsylvania's gothic Heinz Chapel on the campus of the University of Pittsburgh, Simões-Ferreira married future U.S. Senator John Heinz, an heir to the H. J. Heinz Company. The couple had three sons, including André and Christopher. In 1971, Teresa Heinz became a naturalized United States citizen. John Heinz died in a plane crash on April 4, 1991. Teresa Heinz inherited a fortune from her husband upon his death.

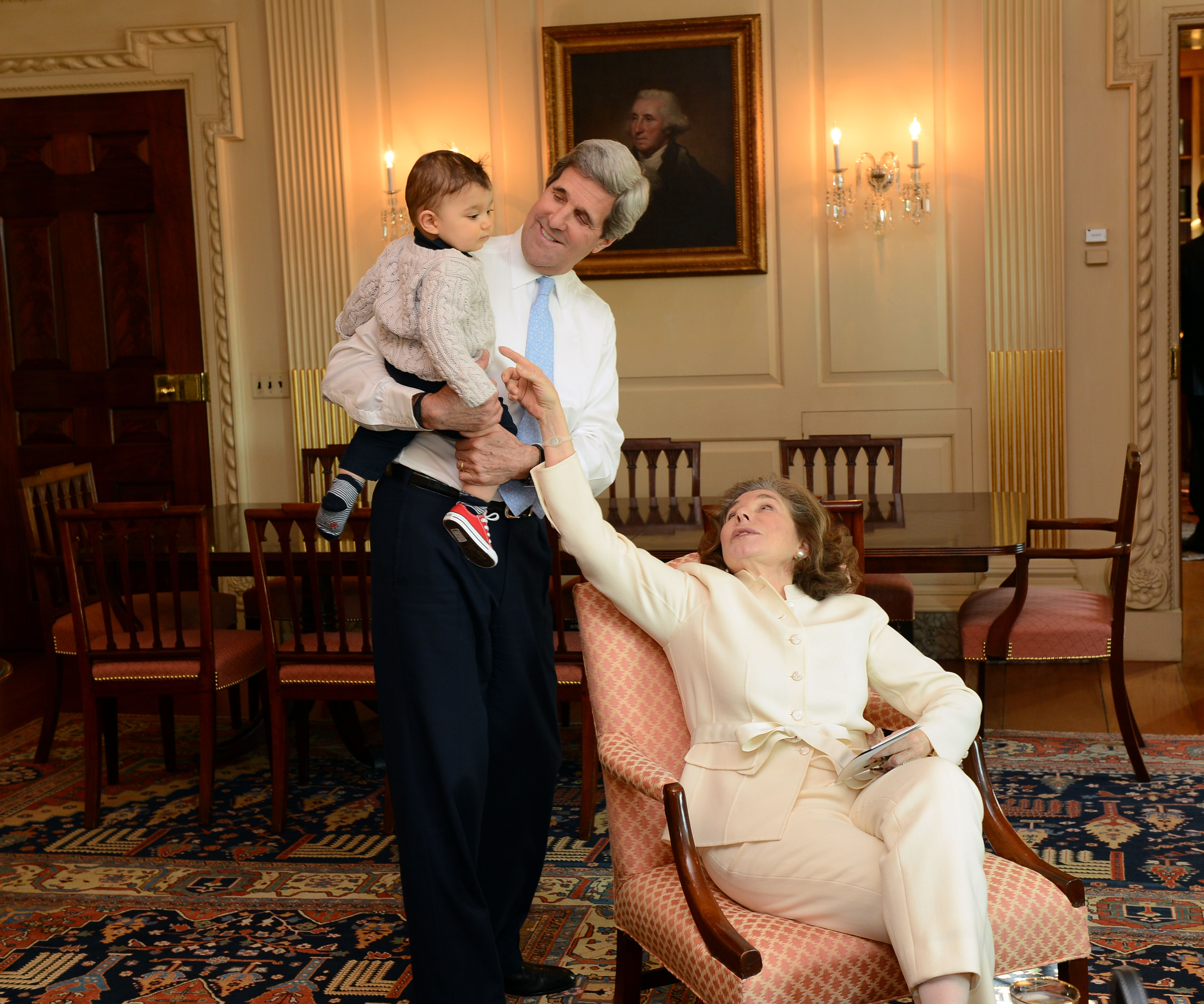
Teresa Heinz Kerry and Secretary Kerry with her grandson

In 1990, Teresa Heinz met Senator John Kerry at an Earth Day rally. This was the only reported time the two met before John Heinz's death. In 1992, Teresa Heinz met Kerry again, this time at the Earth Summit in Rio de Janeiro, Brazil. Heinz was a member of a State Department delegation appointed by then-President George H. W. Bush. Heinz and Kerry were married May 26, 1995, in Nantucket, Massachusetts.

Following her marriage to Kerry, Heinz retained the name Teresa Heinz. In May 2004, she said:

My legal name is still Teresa Heinz. Teresa Heinz Kerry is my name... for politics. Just so people don't ask me questions about so and so is so and so's wife or this and that. Teresa Heinz is what I've been all my growing-up life, adult life, more than any other name. And it's the name of my boys, you know ?... So, that's my legal name and that's my office name, my Pittsburgh name.

=== Health ===
In December 2009, Heinz revealed that she was being treated for breast cancer. She indicated that she had undergone several lumpectomies and would be following up with a targeted type of radiation therapy treatment called accelerated partial breast irradiation (APBI).

On July 7, 2013, Heinz was taken by ambulance to Nantucket Cottage Hospital after showing symptoms consistent with a seizure. She was described as being in "critical but stable" condition. Heinz was then flown to Massachusetts General Hospital for further medical treatment and tests. Her condition was upgraded to fair the next day, and doctors were able to rule out a heart attack, brain tumor, stroke, and other triggers. On July 11, she was transferred to Spaulding Rehabilitation Hospital to continue her recovery. Heinz was released on July 17, 2013, from Spaulding Rehabilitation Hospital in Boston. She recovered at home after some limited out-patient treatment.

== Philanthropy ==
Heinz has served as chair of the Heinz Endowments and the Heinz Family Philanthropies. She has also served on the Board of Selectors of Jefferson Awards for Public Service.

=== Environmental programs and advocacy ===
Heinz has contributed to the environmental movement through many programs and outreach efforts. In 1990, she co-founded the Alliance to End Childhood Lead Poisoning (later known as the Alliance for Healthy Homes, it has since merged with the National Center for Healthy Housing), through the first environmental grant of the Vira I. Heinz Endowment. In 1992, she was a Delegate to the Earth Summit, representing Non-Governmental Organizations.

In 1993, with Kerry and environmentalist academic Dr. Anthony Cortese, she co-founded Second Nature, which brings "Education for Sustainability" to college campuses. In 1993, she founded the Heinz Awards, including a category for Outstanding Contributions to the Environment. In 1995, with a $20 million grant, the Heinz Endowments provided initial funding for The Heinz Center, "a nonprofit institution dedicated to improving the scientific and economic foundation for environmental policy through multisectoral collaboration among industry, government, academia, and environmental organizations."

Since 1996, Heinz has hosted an annual "Women's Health and the Environment" conference series. She founded Teresa Heinz Scholars for Environmental Research, which annually awards eight $10,000 awards for doctoral dissertation support and eight $5,000 awards for Masters' thesis support for research having "public policy relevance that increases society's understanding of environmental concerns and proposed solutions." Heinz is a board member of the Environmental Defense Fund.

=== Women's economic security programs and advocacy ===
In 1995, the book Pensions in Crisis: Why the system is failing America and how you can protect your future (later republished as The Pension Book) was published, with support from the Teresa and H. John Heinz III Foundation, and a foreword by Heinz.

Spurred by the issues uncovered by Pensions in Crisis, Heinz and her foundation created the Women's Retirement Initiative to "extend that investigation and examine how the dynamics of our pension and retirement system contribute to the disproportionate rate of poverty among older women."

In 1996, the Heinz Foundations created WISER, the Women's Institute for a Secure Retirement.

== Politics ==
Like her first husband, Heinz was a registered Republican for most of her voting life, and she remained a registered Republican despite being married to Kerry. In January 2003, she changed her registration to the Democratic Party.

In 2003, Heinz was named to the PoliticsPA list of "Pennsylvania's Most Politically Powerful Women".

Heinz is said to have been encouraged to run for her first husband's vacant Senate seat after his death. Heinz declined and refused to endorse Republican Congressman Rick Santorum's 1994 bid for the seat. She publicly denounced him as the "antithesis" of her late husband, and later called him "Forrest Gump with attitude." It was rumored she would challenge Santorum in 2006 (as a Democrat), but she did not enter the race, and the Democratic nomination went to State Treasurer Bob Casey Jr., who went on to defeat Santorum.

In a 2004 interview, Heinz criticized George W. Bush's Iraq War policy, stating, "Our first priority was terrorism. We have now made enemies of people who were our friends, and even our allies distrust us. And that's a terrible thing."

Heinz has a reputation in the media as a very direct personality. In an interview published in USA Today in July 2004, Heinz was asked about the differences between then-First Lady Laura Bush and herself:

"Well, you know, I don't know Laura Bush. But she seems to be calm, and she has a sparkle in her eye, which is good. But I don't know that she's ever had a real job — I mean, since she's been grown up. So her experience and her validation comes from important things, but different things. And I'm older, and my validation of what I do and what I believe and my experience is a little bit bigger — because I'm older, and I've had different experiences. And it's not a criticism of her. It's just, you know, what life is about."

Heinz retracted the statement later, saying she was "sincerely sorry" for the remark. "I had forgotten that Mrs. Bush had worked as a schoolteacher and librarian, and there couldn't be a more important job than teaching our children", Heinz said. "As someone who has been both a full time mom and full time in the workforce, I know we all have valuable experiences that shape who we are. I appreciate and honor Mrs. Bush's service to the country as first lady, and am sincerely sorry I had not remembered her important work in the past."

As the wife of the presidential nominee, Heinz spoke at the 2004 Democratic National Convention.
