= Bohman & Schwartz =

Defunct American motor vehicle body manufacturer

Bohman & Schwartz was an automobile coachbuilder in Pasadena, California. It was established after the collapse of the Walter M Murphy Company by some of Murphy's former employees.

== Gallery ==
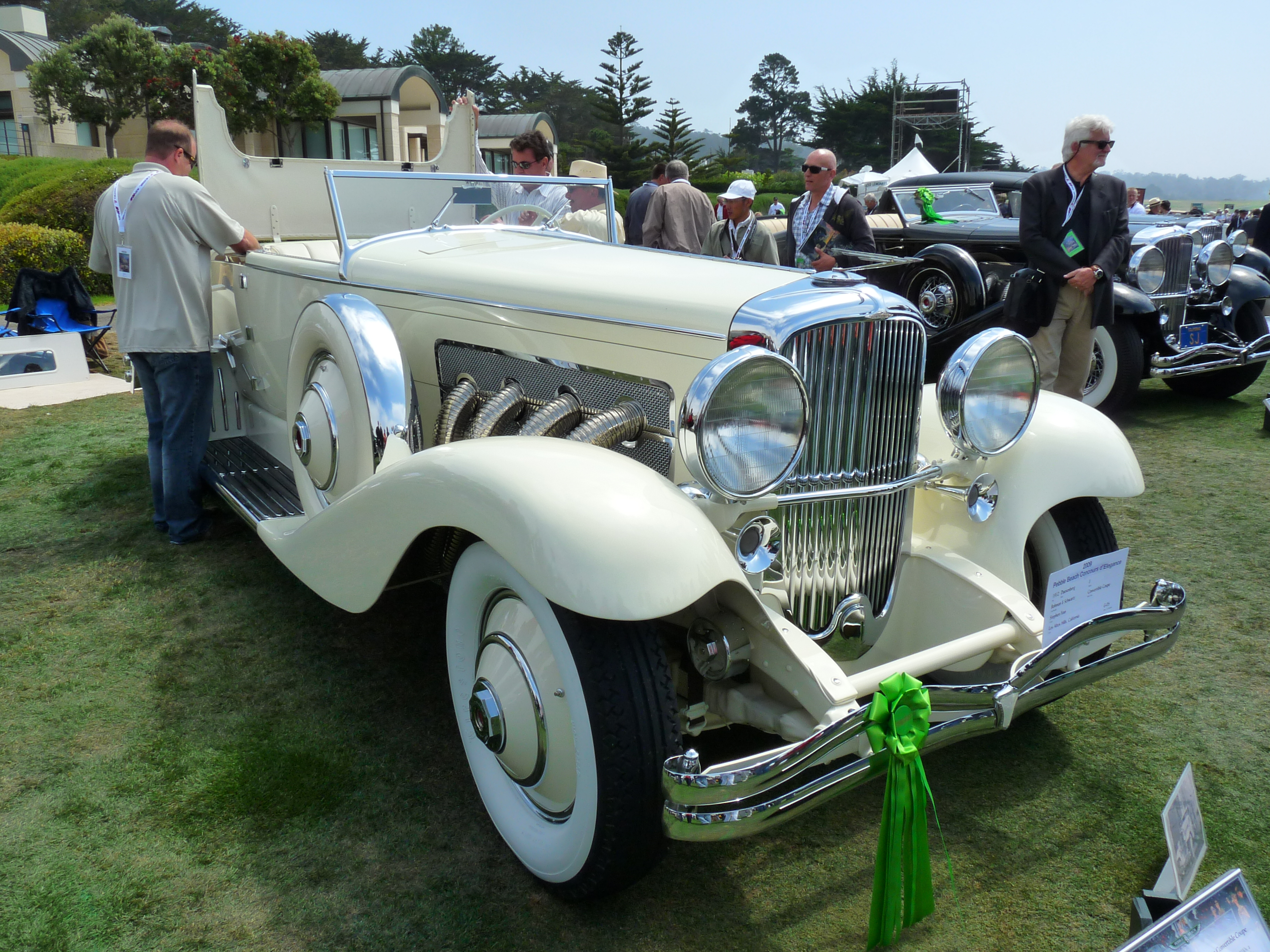
Bohman & Schwartz body on a 1932 Duesenberg J chassis

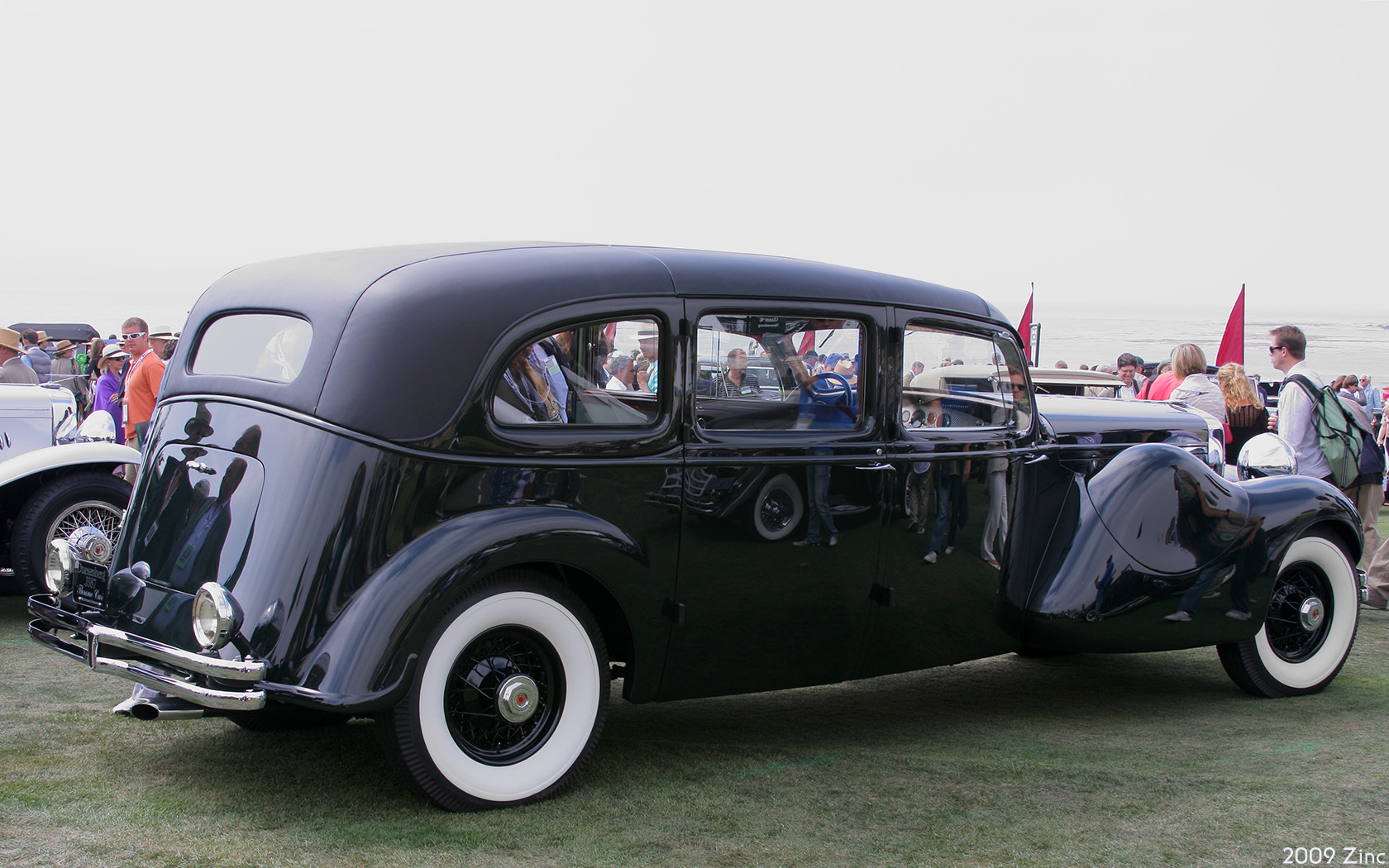
1937 Duesenberg J Laundalet bodied by Bohman & Schwartz

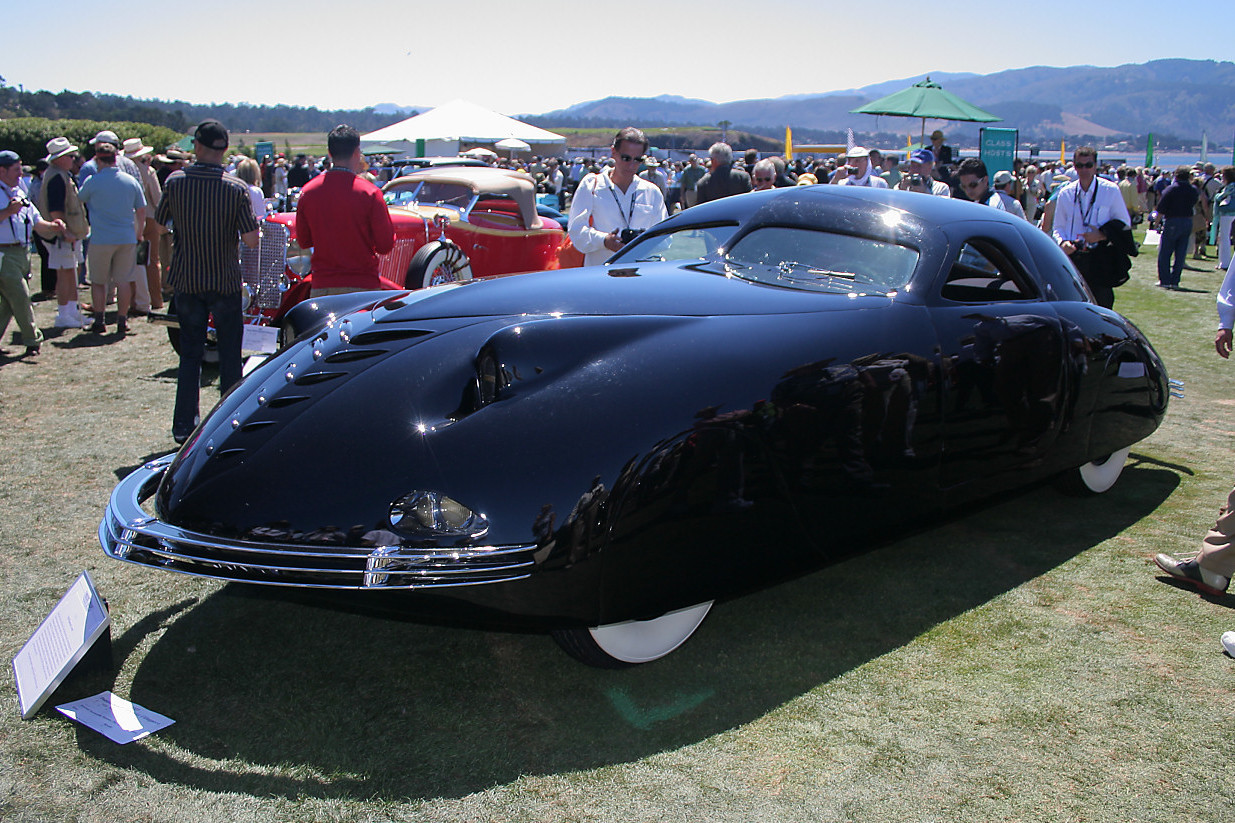
Maurice Schwartz of Bohman & Schwartz helped bring the initial drawings of the Phantom Corsair to reality, and subsequently built it.

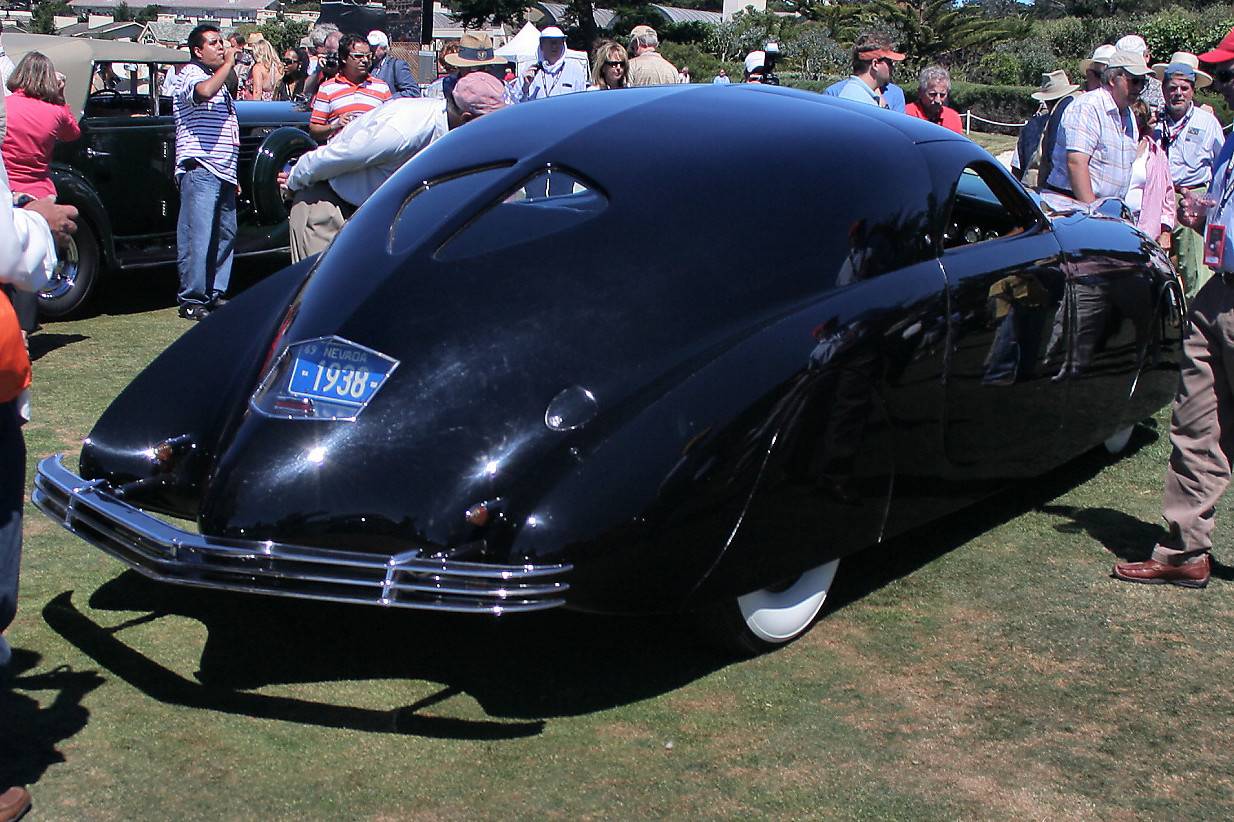
1938 Phantom Corsair rear
