= Henry J. Heinz =

American businessman (1844–1919)

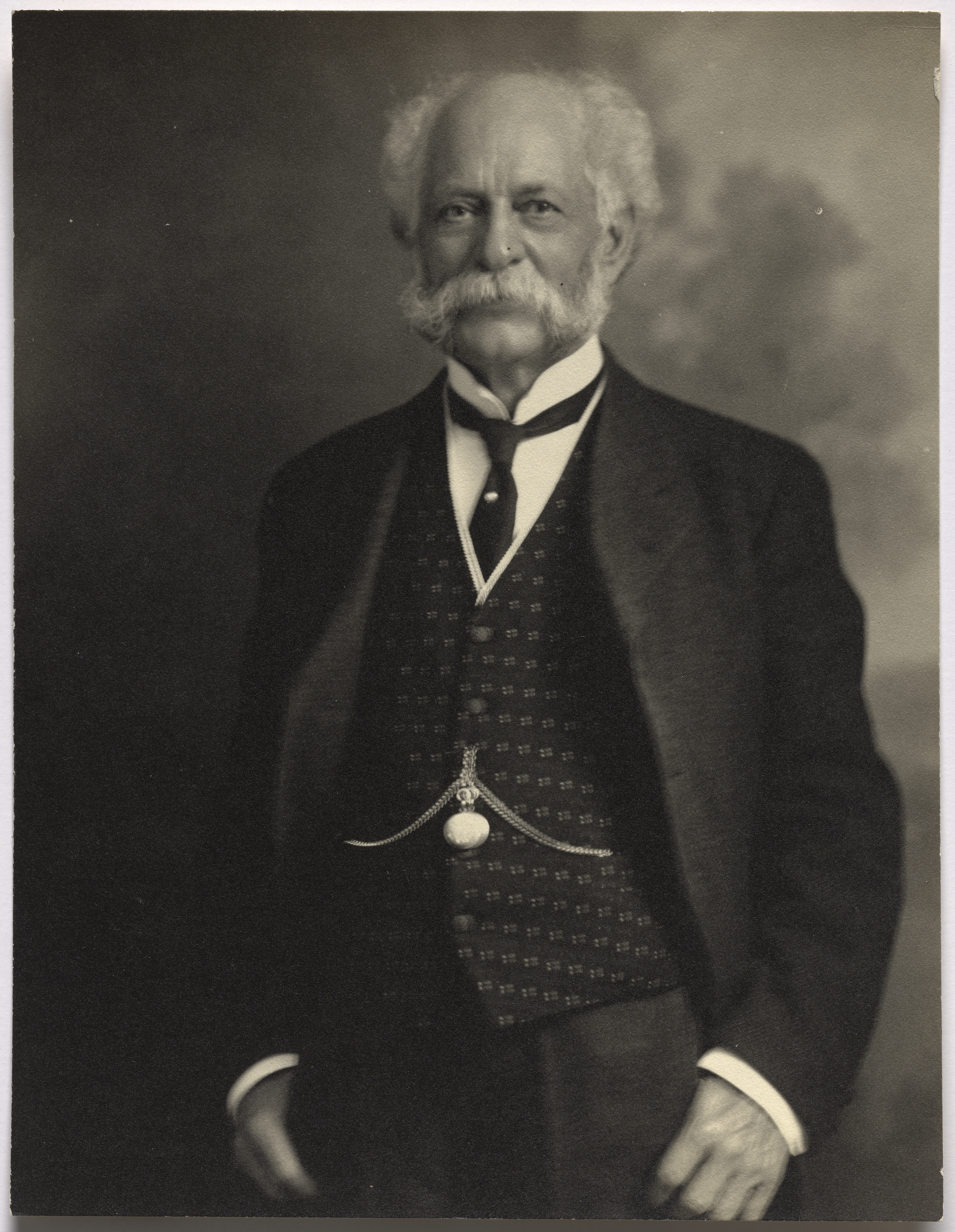
- Heinz c. 1914
- Born: Henry John Heinz; October 11, 1844; Birmingham, Pennsylvania, U.S.
- Died: May 14, 1919 (aged 74); Pittsburgh, Pennsylvania, U.S.
- Burial place: Homewood Cemetery
- Occupation: Business magnate
- Known for: The creator of Heinz Tomato Ketchup
- Title: Founder of H. J. Heinz Company
- Spouse: Sarah Sloan Young Heinz (m. 1869; died 1894)
- Children: 5
- Relatives: Trump family

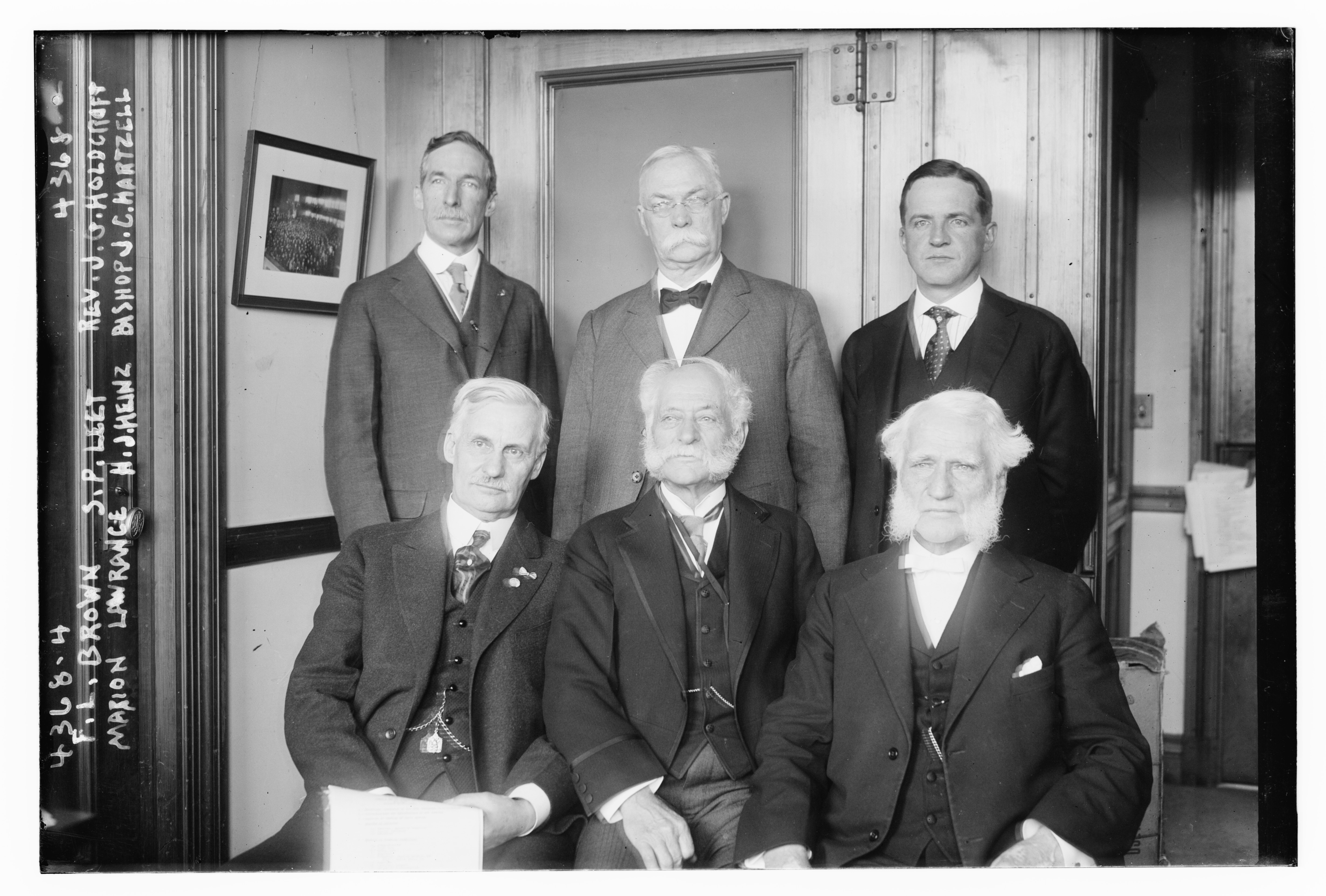
F.L. Brown, S.P. Leet, Reverend J.G. Holdcroft, Marion Lawrence, Henry John Heinz, and Bishop Joseph Crane Hartzell in 1917

Henry John Heinz (October 11, 1844 – May 14, 1919) was an American entrepreneur who co-founded the H. J. Heinz Company of Pittsburgh, Pennsylvania. He was involved in the passage of the 1906 Pure Food and Drug Act. Many of his descendants are known for philanthropy and involvement in politics and public affairs. His fortune became the basis for the Heinz Foundations.

== Early life ==
Henry John Heinz was born in Pittsburgh, Pennsylvania, to John Henry Heinz (1811–1919), and Anna Margaretha Schmidt (1822–1899). John Henry Heinz was born Johann Heinrich Heinz to parents Johann Georg Heinz and Charlotte Louisa (née Trump). Heinz's mother's family, the Trump family, was originally from Kallstadt of the Palatinate, which at that time was part of the Kingdom of Bavaria. In 1840, John Henry immigrated to Birmingham, where he got a job making bricks and then met and married Anna in 1843, who herself had recently emigrated from Kruspis (today a part of Haunetal), Hesse-Kassel. Then when Henry was five years old, his parents moved to Sharpsburg where Henry’s father went into the brick making business for himself. Anna Schmidt was the daughter of a farmer and church administrator, Johann Adam Schmidt, and Dorothea (Thiel) Schmidt. (Note: At least one biographer has erroneously written that Anna's father was a pastor, based on a mistranslation of the German word "Kirchenältester" which appears before Anna's father's name in Anna's baptism record. "Kirchenältester" does not mean "pastor," but rather refers to a lay church administrator who is elected by the parish elders to safeguard the affairs of the church.) Anna came from Hesse-Kassel, which was a Reformed Protestant (Calvinist) territory, so she was raised in the Calvinist Christian faith. Anna's husband, John Henry Heinz, was a Lutheran, and they raised and confirmed their son to that faith.

== H. J. Heinz Company ==
Henry John Heinz began packing foodstuffs on a small scale at Sharpsburg, Pennsylvania, in 1869. There, he founded Heinz Noble & Company with a friend, L. Clarence Noble, and started marketing bottled horseradish, soon followed by sauerkraut, vinegar, and pickles. The company went bankrupt in 1875. The following year, Heinz founded another company, F & J Heinz, with his brother John Heinz and a cousin, Frederick Heinz.

The company grew and, in 1888, Heinz bought out his other two partners and reorganized it as the H. J. Heinz Company, the name carried to the present day. The company was incorporated in 1905, with Heinz serving as its first president and retaining that position for the rest of his life.

The company's slogan, "57 varieties," was introduced by Heinz in 1896, though by then, the company was selling more than 60 different products. Heinz said he chose "5" because it was his lucky number, while "7" was his wife's lucky number.

At the time of Heinz's death in Pittsburgh at the age of 74, the H. J. Heinz Company had more than 20 food processing plants and owned seed farms and container factories.

== Personal life ==
Heinz led a successful lobbying effort in favor of the Pure Food and Drug Act in 1906. During World War I, he worked with the Food Administration. He was a director in many financial institutions, and was chairman of a committee to devise ways of protecting Pittsburgh from floods.

=== Marriage and family ===
Heinz married Sarah Sloan Young on September 3, 1869. She was of Scots-Irish ancestry and had grown up in the Presbyterian Church. They had five children:

- Irene Edwilda Heinz-Given (1871–1956)
- Clarence Henry Heinz (1873–1920)
- Howard Covode Heinz (1877–1941)
- Robert Eugene Heinz (1882–1882, lived about 1 month)
- Clifford Sloan Heinz (1883–1935)

They were raised as Presbyterians.

=== Religious faith ===
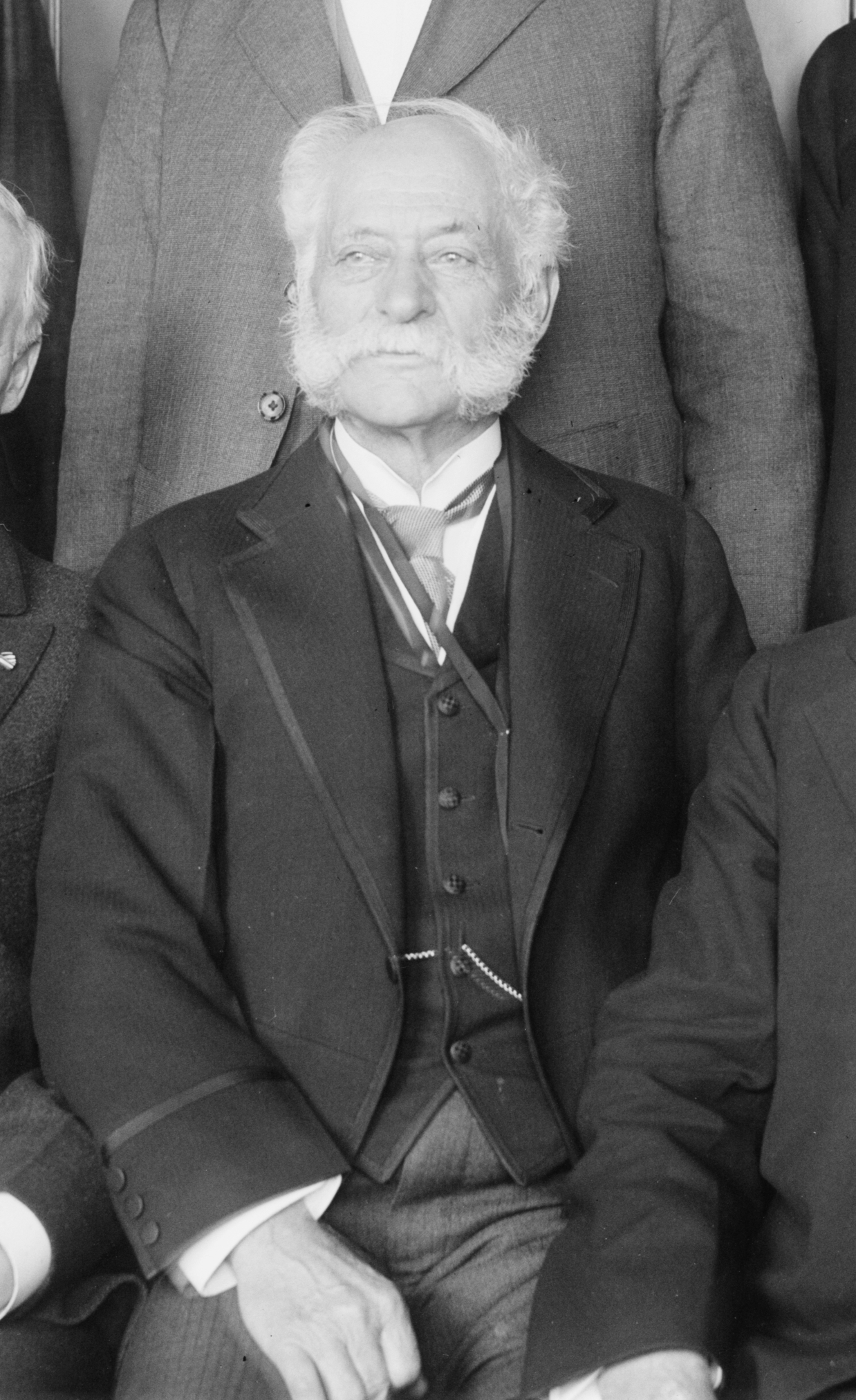
Henry J. Heinz in 1917

Later in life Heinz worshipped as a member of Methodist and Presbyterian churches, and worked closely with Baptists as well.

When Heinz visited England, his "tourist stops" included the graves of religious leaders John Bunyan, Isaac Watts, and John Wesley. He visited a chapel that Wesley founded, later writing that "I felt I was upon holy ground." At the beginning of his will Heinz wrote: "I desire to set forth, at the very beginning of this Will, as the most important item in it, a confession of my faith in Jesus Christ as my Savior."

=== Death and legacy ===
Heinz died at his home on May 14, 1919, after contracting pneumonia. His funeral was at East Liberty Presbyterian Church. He was buried at Homewood Cemetery in Pittsburgh, in the Heinz Family Mausoleum.

A bronze statue of Heinz by Emil Fuchs was dedicated on October 11, 1924, at the Heinz Company building in Pittsburgh.

Heinz is the grandfather of H. J. Heinz II (1908–1987), the great-grandfather of U.S. Senator H. John Heinz III (1938–1991) of Pennsylvania (who was later buried in the same family mausoleum), and great-great grandfather of Henry John Heinz IV, André Thierstein Heinz, and Christopher Drake Heinz.
