= 1991 Merion mid-air collision =

1991 mid-air collision

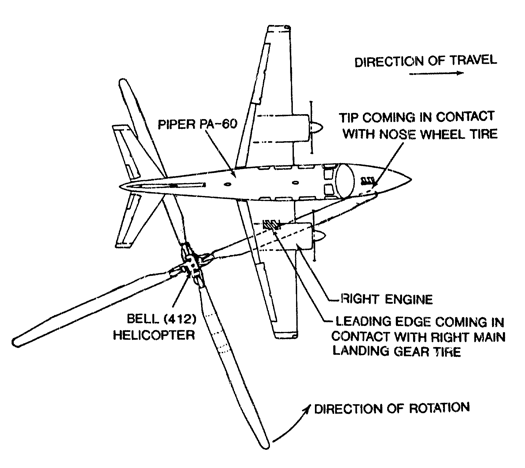
- NTSB diagram of the collision

Accident
- Date: April 4, 1991
- Summary: Mid-air collision due to pilot error on both aircraft
- Site: Lower Merion Township, Pennsylvania; 40.0017°N 75.2568°W
- Total fatalities: 7
- Total injuries: 5
- Total survivors: 0

First aircraft
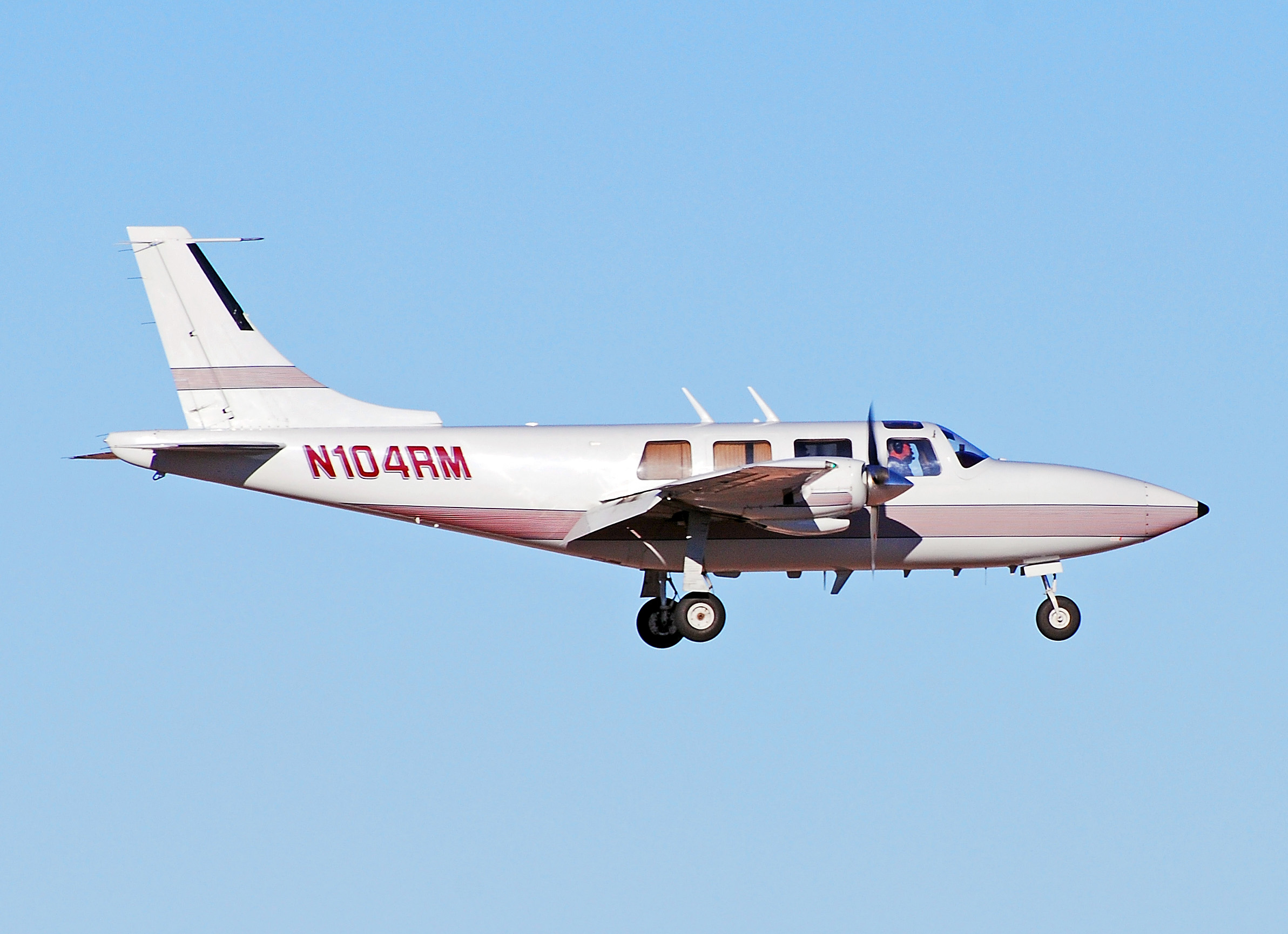
- A Piper Aerostar similar to the one involved in the accident
- Type: Piper Aerostar
- Registration: N3645D
- Flight origin: Williamsport Regional Airport
- Destination: Philadelphia International Airport
- Occupants: 3
- Passengers: 1
- Crew: 2
- Fatalities: 3
- Survivors: 0

Second aircraft
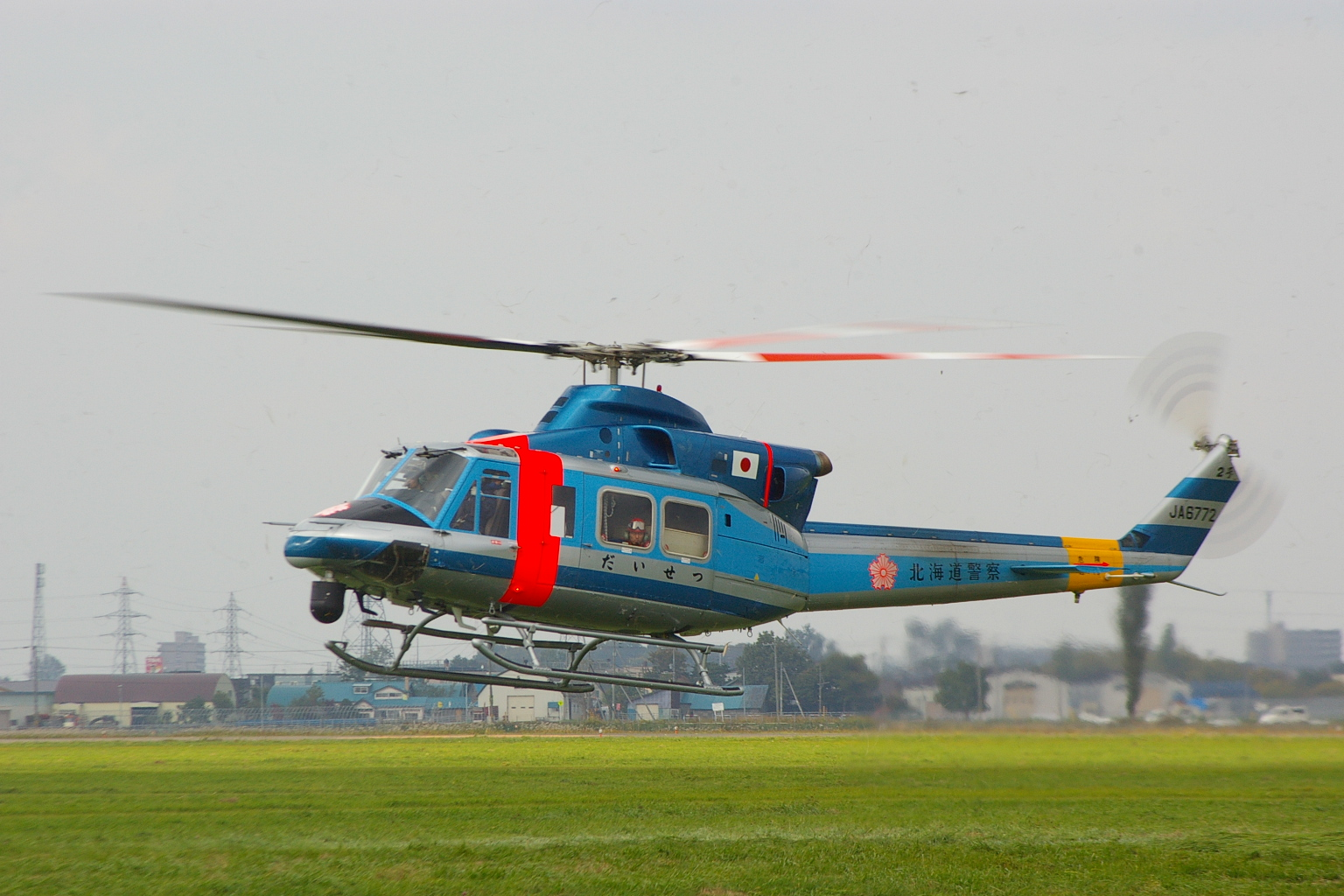
- A Bell 412EP similar to the one involved in the accident
- Type: Bell 412
- Registration: N78S
- Occupants: 2
- Crew: 2
- Fatalities: 2
- Survivors: 0

Ground casualties
- Ground fatalities: 2
- Ground injuries: 5

On April 4, 1991, a Piper Aerostar propeller-driven aircraft collided in mid-air with a Bell 412 helicopter over Merion Elementary School in Lower Merion Township, a suburb west of Philadelphia, in southeast Pennsylvania. All five people in both aircraft were killed, including United States Senator John Heinz, the sole passenger of the Piper. On the ground, two schoolchildren were killed by falling debris and five people were injured.

An investigation determined the accident was caused by poor crew judgment and pilot error in both aircraft.

== Background ==
John Heinz's aircraft departed from Williamsport Regional Airport (IPT) in central Pennsylvania on the morning of April 4, 1991, at about 10:22 a.m. EST. Heinz was in Williamsport for a press conference pertaining to federal funding of U.S. Route 15. Heinz hired a twin-engine Piper PA-60-601 Aerostar from Lycoming Air Services, an air taxi operator based at the Williamsport airport. Heinz and his two pilots, both from Lycoming County, departed for Philadelphia International Airport (PHL) slightly before 10:30 a.m.

== Crash ==
As Heinz's aircraft made its approach to Philadelphia International Airport at approximately 12:01 p.m., the pilots noticed that the nose landing gear "locked" indicator light was not illuminated. The crew began troubleshooting the problem and alerted air traffic control (ATC). A pilot in the Piper told ATC he could see the apparently extended nose gear reflected in the propeller spinners. Approximately three minutes later, the plane executed a low pass near the tower; the controller reported to the crew that the nose gear appeared to be extended.

The crew of a passing Bell 412SP helicopter, operated by Sun Company Inc. and headed to the company's headquarters in Radnor, Pennsylvania, offered to take a closer look to see if the gear was indeed down and locked. They moved near the Aerostar for a better look, and the final transmission from the helicopter crew was to advise the Aerostar crew that "everything looks good from here".

At 12:10 p.m., the two aircraft collided over Merion Elementary in Lower Merion, with the helicopter's rotor blades clipping the Aerostar from underneath, severing a main rotor blade of the helicopter and a main wing panel of the airplane and rendering both aircraft uncontrollable. The helicopter spun out of control and the Aerostar dived to the ground; both caught fire and disintegrated on impact in the elementary school grounds, while children were playing outside during their lunch recess. The Aerostar fell in the school yard near the entrance loop while the Bell fell behind the school building; debris also fell on nearby private residences in a 250-yard (230 m) radius around the school. The collision killed all five people on both aircraft, including Heinz. On the ground, two schoolgirls were killed, and five other persons were injured by fire and debris. The school's custodian, John Fowler, and reading specialist Ivy Weeks helped put out the flames that caught on student David Rutenberg's jacket. Post-crash fires destroyed much of the aircraft wreckage and some landscaping at the school.

== Investigation ==
A National Transportation Safety Board (NTSB) investigation was opened almost immediately. Investigators cited a litany of mistakes and wrong decisions that led to the deaths and injuries. "This was a senseless accident that didn't have to happen," said James L. Kolstad, then-chairman of the NTSB.

In September 1991, the NTSB's finding were announced. It was determined that the poor judgment of both flight crews caused the accident.

The NTSB report stated that visual checks from the helicopter and control tower were pointless because the nose gear doors of the Aerostar partially close when the gear extends, obscuring most of the locking mechanism and making it "virtually impossible" to determine even from an "unsafe distance" whether the nose gear was locked. No useful information could have been provided beyond what the pilots had already determined for themselves by looking at the propeller spinner reflections, the NTSB said, noting that the Aerostar pilots should have realized this due to their presumed familiarity with their own aircraft. The NTSB said that the helicopter crew should have also realized the futility of the task due to the inherent difficulty of seeing fine detail while looking upwards through the Bell's front windshields. The Bell was equipped with overhead windows, but the operator had painted them over because light flicker from the main rotor had caused pilots to experience vertigo.

The NTSB criticized the Piper flight manual for lacking explicit procedures to follow if the nose gear indicator light would not illuminate. However, the aircraft was also equipped with a landing gear warning horn that would sound if the throttles were moved to the idle position when the gear was not down and locked; the pilots could have verified whether the gear was locked by reducing throttle at a safe altitude and listening for the horn, which was part of the procedure in the flight manual if the landing gear hydraulics failed. The NTSB could not determine whether this was attempted, as the Aerostar was not equipped with a cockpit voice recorder, but the NTSB concluded from radio communications with controllers that the pilots most likely did not attempt it. Even if the procedure was fruitless, the NTSB said that with the nose gear visibly in the down position, a more experienced pilot probably would have still attempted a landing "accepting the possibility that the nose gear could collapse during the landing roll", as such a condition "does not generally result in a major accident or occupant injury".

The NTSB noted that none of the pilots had any formal experience or training in formation flying; the helicopter pilots had flown close to another helicopter in the past, but at a considerably greater distance than in the accident flight, and it was not known if they had ever flown near a fixed-wing airplane. The NTSB said that aerodynamic forces tend to pull aircraft toward one another when one flies immediately above another, and assertive flight control corrections may be required to counteract this; although radar data was inadequate to determine if such an event had in fact occurred, Bell Helicopter engineers confirmed that the 412SP is subject to this tendency. The NTSB faulted the crews of both aircraft for attempting unfamiliar and inherently risky maneuvers over a populated area, as both aircraft had ample fuel, and there was no other factor present that would compel the pilots to finish the inspection quickly. The NTSB recommended that the Federal Aviation Administration (FAA) make a more concerted effort to train pilots to recognize such hazardous situations and exercise better judgment.

Due to collision, ground impact, and fire damage, the NTSB was unable to determine if the Aerostar's nose gear or the nose gear warning systems were functioning properly before the crash.

== Aftermath ==
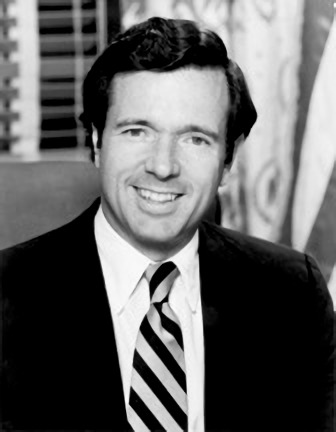
U.S. Senator John Heinz

Word of Heinz's death came from his Washington office. At midafternoon, sobbing members of his staff began walking out of his office in the Russell Senate Office Building. A few minutes later, the senator's legislative director, Richard Bryers, announced Heinz's death to reporters.

News of Heinz's death at age 52 shocked fellow lawmakers:

- Senator Tim Wirth of Colorado stated that he and his wife, Wren, considered Heinz and his wife, Teresa, "our dearest friends in the Senate," and paid tribute to his "intense intelligence, sparkling charm, and broad vision."
- Senate Minority Leader Bob Dole of Kansas called Heinz "a dynamic and dedicated public servant, a tireless champion for Pennsylvania and a good and decent family man".
- Vice President Dan Quayle, in Los Angeles for a speech, said: "We are going to miss John Heinz tremendously. He made a tremendous contribution to the U.S. Senate."

The crash received multi-national attention, with reports appearing in multiple regions including the United Kingdom, France, Germany, Canada, and Australia. Flights over Merion Elementary School during school hours were informally banned for a period of time, and media avoided flying news or traffic helicopters over the school.

Heinz's funeral was held in Pittsburgh, and a memorial service in Washington was attended by President George H. W. Bush and Vice President Quayle. The nearby Tinicum National Wildlife Refuge was renamed for Heinz, who had played a role in its preservation.
