= Hintz =

Hintz may refer to:

== Places ==
- Hintz, Wisconsin, an unincorporated community in USA
- Cluj-Napoca Hintz House, a historic building in Romania

== People ==
- Andrew Hintz (1963–2016), New Zealand cricketer
- Gordon Hintz (born 1973), Democratic Party member of the Wisconsin State Assembly
- Johannes Hintz (1898–1944), highly decorated Generalleutnant in the Luftwaffe during World War II
- Joy Alice Hintz (1926–2009), American writer
- Mathew Hintz (1976–2017), American painter
- Miiko Hintz (born 1992), Finnish ice hockey player
- Mike Hintz (born 1965), former defensive back in the National Football League
- Orton Sutherland Hintz (1907–1985), New Zealand journalist
- Pat Hintz (1914–2004), American basketball player
- Peter Hintz (born 1991), German mathematician
- Roope Hintz (born 1996), Finnish ice hockey player
- Viktor Hintz (1888–1972), Finnish politician

== Fictional characters ==
- Terry Hintz, a character in the 2014 video game Lisa: The Painful

== See also ==
- Hint (disambiguation)
- Hinz (disambiguation)
- Hinz (surname)
