= Heinz (given name) =

- Pronunciation: English: /haɪnz/ HYNZE; German: [haɪnts]
- Gender: Male
- Language: German

Origin
- Origin: Germanic Haimric
- Meaning: Home-ruler

Other names
- Cognates: Henry, Heinrich, Enzo

Heinz is a German given name, a diminutive of Heinrich and cognate of the given name Henry. People with this given name include:

== People with the given name Heinz ==
- Heinz Allersmeier (1917–2001), German Army officer in World War II
- Heinz von Allmen (1913–2003), Swiss Olympic skier
- Heinz Alt (1922–1945), German composer and victim of the Nazi regime
- Heinz Anger (born 1941), Austrian painter
- Heinz Ansbacher (1904–2006), German-American psychologist
- Heinz Arndt (1915–2002), Australian economist
- Heinz Arnold (1919–1945), German Luftwaffe fighter ace
- Heinz Arzberger (born 1972), Austrian football player
- Heinz Auerswald (1908–1970), German lawyer and member of the SS
- Heinz Barwich (1911–1966), German nuclear physicist
- Heinz Burt (1942–2000), German-born British pop singer
- Heinz Edelmann (1934–2009), German illustrator and designer
- Heinz Fiedler (1929–1993), German general
- Heinz Erhardt (1909–1979), German comedian, entertainer and actor
- Heinz Ewald (1922–2002), German World War II fighter pilot
- Heinz Fischer (born 1938), President of Austria
- Heinz von Foerster (1911–2002), Austrian-American physicist and philosopher
- Heinz Galinski (1912–1992), president of the Central Council of Jews in Germany
- Heinz Guderian (1888–1954), German general during World War II, one of the principal commanders of Eastern Front (World War II) and Battle of Moscow
- Heinz-Günther Guderian (1914–2004), German officer in the Wehrmacht and later NATO, son of Heinz Guderian
- Heinz Günthardt (born 1959), Swiss tennis player
- Heinz van Haaren (born 1940), Dutch football player
- Heinz-Harald Frentzen (born 1967), German racing driver
- Heinz Harant (1919–1992), Australian student activist
- Heinz Heck (1894–1982), German biologist and zoo director
- Heinz Werner Höber (1931–1996), prolific pulp fiction author
- Heinz Hoenig (born 1951), German actor
- Heinz Höher (1938–2019), German footballer
- Heinz Höhne (1926–2010), German journalist and historian
- Heinz Hopf (1894–1971), German mathematician
- Heinz Körner (1893–1961), Austrian footballer and coach
- Heinz-Otto Kreiss (1930–2015), German mathematician
- Heinz Kühn (1912–1992), German politician
- Heinz Kurschildgen, German charlatan
- Heinz Rudolf Kunze (born 1956), German singer
- Heinz Lembke (1937–1981), German right-wing extremist
- Heinz-Georg Lemm (1919–1994), German military officer
- Heinz Linge (1913–1980), SS officer who served as Adolf Hitler's valet
- Heinz A. Lowenstam (1912–1993), German-born, Jewish-American paleoecologist
- Heinz von Lichberg (1890–1951), German author known for his 1916 short story Lolita
- Heinz Magenheimer (born 1943), Austrian historical revisionist
- Heinz Mayr (born 1935), German racewalker
- Heinz Plank (born 1945), German painter, draughtsman and graphic artist
- Heinz von Randow (1890–1942), German army general in World War II
- Heinz Raack (1917–2002), German hockey player
- Heinz Rühmann (1902–1994), German actor
- Heinz Spoerli (born 1940), Swiss choreographer
- Heinz Staab (1926–2012), German chemist and director of the Max Planck Society
- Heinz Steinberger (born 1958), Austrian ice speed skater
- Heinz-Christian Strache (born 1969), Austrian politician and former Vice-Chancellor
- Heinz Weber (born 1976), Austrian former footballer
- Heinz Winckler (born 1978), singer, winner of the first South Africa Idols competition
- Heinz Wolff (1928–2017), German-British scientist and TV presenter
- Heinz Zander (1939–2024), German artist and writer

== People better known by other names ==
- Heinz Alfred Kissinger (Henry Kissinger), German-born American academic, political scientist, diplomat, and businessman
- Heinz Horst Bodo Dettke (Bodo Dettke), a Solomon Islands politician
- Heinz Kurt Bolender (Kurt Bolender), SS officer in World War II
- Heinz Strobl (Gandalf), Austrian New Age composer
- Heinz-Frederic Jolles (Henry Jolles), a German pianist and composer
- Heinz-Georg Kramm (Heino), German singer and entertainer

== Fictional characters ==
- Heinz, a character from the Japanese animated film Memories
- Heinz, a Dutch comic strip about a grumpy, sarcastic cat by René Windig and Eddie de Jong.
- Heinz Doofenshmirtz, a fictional character from Phineas and Ferb
- Heinz Kruger, a German spy during World War II in the Marvel Comics universe
- Heinz Thorvald, character in the 1999 novel War of the Rats
- Heinz Thorvald, character in the 2001 film Enemy at the Gates

== See also ==
- Heinz (surname)
- Hines (name)
- Heinie
- Heinrich (given name)
- Heinz (disambiguation)
