= Lembke =

Lembke is a German surname derived from the personal name Lambrecht. Notable people with the name include:

- Anna Lembke, American psychiatrist
- Charles F. Lembke (1865–1923), American architect
- Gerald Lembke (1966), German business economist
- Heinz Lembke (1937–1981), German right-wing extremist
- Janet Lembke (1933–2013), American author, essayist, naturalist, translator and scholar
- Jim Lembke (1961), Missouri politician
- Katja Lembke (1965), German classical archaeologist
- Robert Lembke (1913–1989), German television presenter and game show host

== See also ==
- Lemke (surname)
- Lembke House, historic house in Albuquerque, New Mexico, built by Charles H. Lembke (1889–1989)
