= Heinze =

Heinze is a surname. Notable people with the surname include:

- Alonso Heinze (born 1948), Mexican sprint canoer
- Andrew R. Heinze (born 1955), American scholar
- Sir Bernard Heinze (1894–1982), Australian conductor and musical administrator
- Cheryll Heinze (1946–2012), American politician
- F. Augustus Heinze (1869–1914), American entrepreneur
- Gabriel Heinze (born 1978), Argentine footballer
- Gerhard Heinze (born 1948), German footballer
- Gus Heinze (born 1926), American photorealist painter
- Kevin Heinze (1928–2008), Australian television presenter
- Lasse Heinze (born 1986), Danish footballer
- Martin Heinze (born 1983), Danish footballer
- Nathan Heinze, American house music and synthpop producer
- Otto Heinze (1877–1968), Estonian military commander
- Ralph Heinze (born 1975), Mexican sprint canoer
- Richard Heinze (1867–1929), German philologist
- Roberto Heinze (born 1946), Mexican sprint canoer
- Rüdiger Heinze (born 1971), German film producer and screenwriter
- Rudolf Heinze (1865–1925), German politician
- Steve Heinze (born 1970), American ice hockey player
- Suse Heinze (born 1920), German diver
- Thomas Heinze (born 1964), German actor
- Timo Heinze (born 1986), German footballer
- Úrsula Heinze (born 1941), German writer and translator

== See also ==
- Jan Heintze (born 1963), Danish footballer
- Heinz (disambiguation)
- Heinze, a rack or trestle for drying hay
- Heinzer, a person who racks or dries hay
- Heinze Islands, a group of four islands which are part of the Moscos Islands in the Andaman Sea off the coast of Burma
- Heinze River, a river in Burma
