= Hint =

Hint and similar may refer to:

- A clue (information) – a piece of information bringing someone closer to a conclusion
- Hint (musician), musician Jonathan James from Sussex, England
- Hint (SQL), a feature of the SQL computer language
- Hint (brand), an American brand of flavored water owned by Hint, Inc.
- Aadu Hint (1910–1989), Estonian writer
- Font hinting, a process for optimizing the rasterization of vectors
- Hints, Shropshire, a location in England
- Hints, Staffordshire, a village in Staffordshire, England
- Motorola Hint QA30, a mobile phone introduced by Motorola

== Acronyms ==
- Hierarchical INTegration, a computer benchmark
- Nord-Trøndelag University College (Norwegian: Høgskolen i Nord-Trøndelag)
- Health Information National Trends Survey
