= Heinz (disambiguation) =

Heinz is an American food conglomerate based in Pittsburgh, Pennsylvania.

Heinz may also refer to:

== Arts and entertainment ==
- Dr. Doofenshmirtz, a fictional character from Phineas and Ferb
- Heinz Records, an independent record label based in Portland, Oregon

== Institutions and organizations ==
- Heinz College, a graduate school at Carnegie Mellon University in Pittsburgh
- Heinz College Australia, the international campus of Carnegie Mellon University in Adelaide, Australia
- Heinz Foundations, a group of philanthropic organizations in the United States
  - Heinz Award, an annual award given by the Heinz Foundation
  - Heinz Endowments, two private charitable organizations in Pennsylvania
- Heinz History Center, a regional affiliate of the Smithsonian Institution in Pittsburgh, Pennsylvania
- The Heinz Center, a nonprofit environmental institution in Washington DC

== People ==
- Heinz (given name), a given name (including a list of people with the given name)
- Heinz (surname), a surname (including a list of people with the surname)
- Heinz (singer) (1942–2000), stage name of German bassist and singer Burt Heinz

== Places ==
- Heinz Field, a football stadium in Pittsburgh, Pennsylvania
- Heinz Lofts, a building in the Troy Hill neighborhood of Pittsburgh, Pennsylvania
- John Heinz National Wildlife Refuge at Tinicum, a National Wildlife Refuge in Pennsylvania
- Heinz Hall for the Performing Arts, a performing arts center and concert hall in Pittsburgh, Pennsylvania
- Heinz Memorial Chapel, a historic property at University of Pittsburgh

== Other uses ==
- Heinz (bet), a type of combination bet offered by some bookmakers
- Heinz dilemma, a frequently used moral dilemma made popular by Lawrence Kohlberg
- Heinz Chapel Choir, a choir from the University of Pittsburgh founded in 1938
- Heinz Southern 500, a NASCAR Sprint Cup Series
- Mixed-breed dog, sometimes called Heinz or Heinz 57, after the Heinz slogan company's slogan "57 varieties"

== See also ==
- Heinze (disambiguation)
- Hinz (disambiguation)
