= Arzberger =

Arzberger is a surname. Notable people with the surname include:

- Gus Arzberger (1921–2016), member of the Arizona State Senate
- Heinz Arzberger (born 1972), Austrian football player
- Johann Arzberger (1778– 1835), Austrian technologist
- Marsha Arzberger (born 1937), member of Arizona State Senate
