= Burgruine Reisberg =

Castle ruin in Austria

Coordinates: 46°48′20″N 14°45′34″E

- Carinthia, Austria
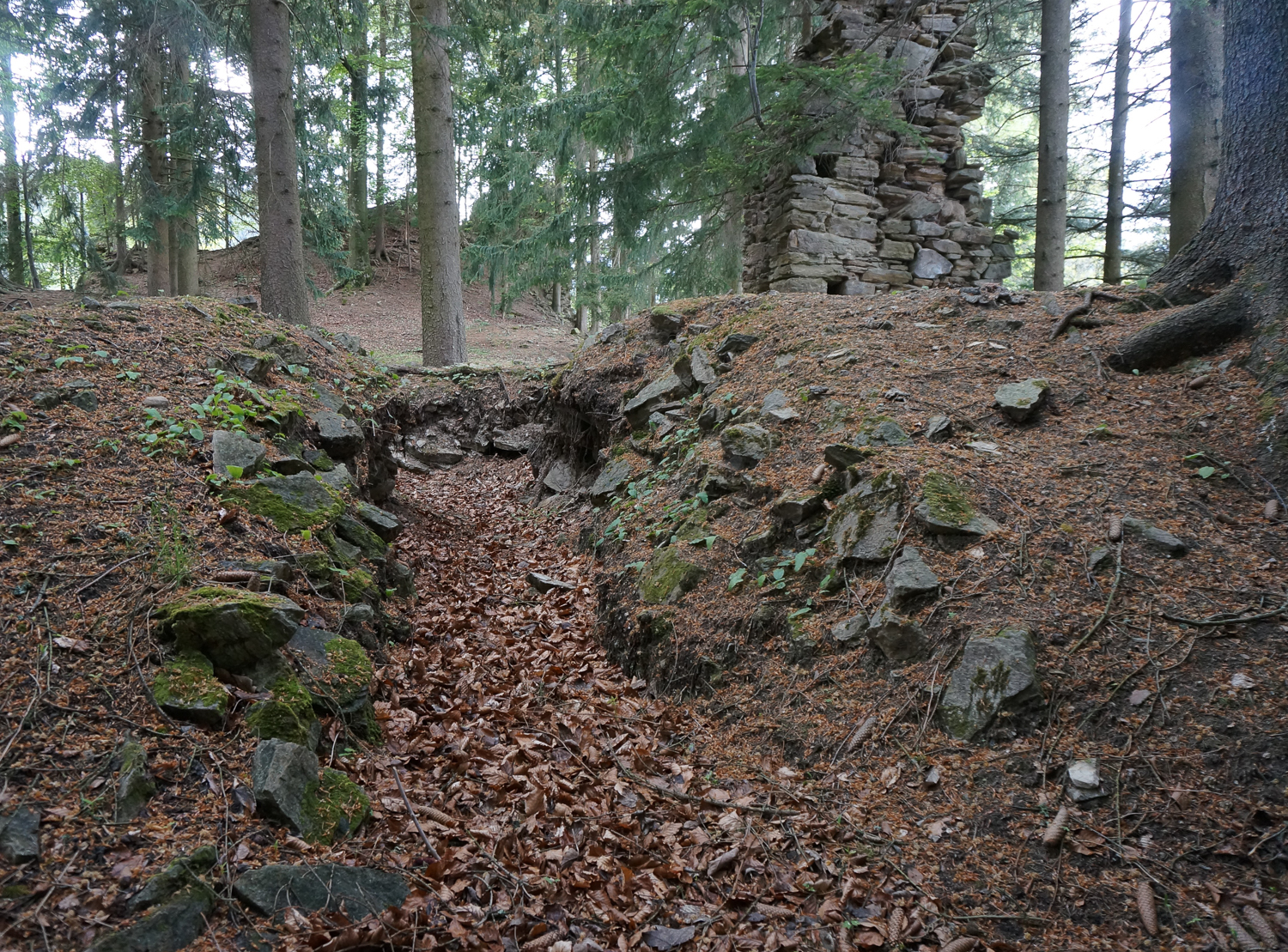

Site information
- Type: Hilltop castle

Site history
- Built: first mentioned 1194

Burgruine Reisberg is a castle near Wolfsberg in Carinthia, Austria.

== See also ==
- List of castles in Austria
