= Hinz (surname) =

Hinz is a surname. Notable people with the surname include:

- Arthur F. Hinz (1886–1969), American politician
- Christopher Hinz (born 1951), American writer
- Dietmar Hinz (born 1953), German wrestler
- Dinah Hinz (1934–2020), German actress
- Emil A. Hinz (1889–1964), American politician
- Gertrud Hinz (1912–1996), German film editor
- Hans-Martin Hinz (born 1947), German museum administrator
- Hermann Hinz (1916–2000), German archaeologist
- Johann-Peter Hinz (1941–2007), German sculptor
- Michael Hinz (1939–2008), German actor
- Michael Hinz (footballer) (born 1987), German footballer
- Petra Hinz (born 1962), German politician
- Tyson Hinz (born 1991), Canadian basketball player
- Vanessa Hinz (born 1992), German biathlete
- Volker Hinz (1947–2019), German photographer
- Werner Hinz (1903–1985), German actor

== See also ==
- Hinz (disambiguation)
