= Walter Kogler =

Austrian footballer

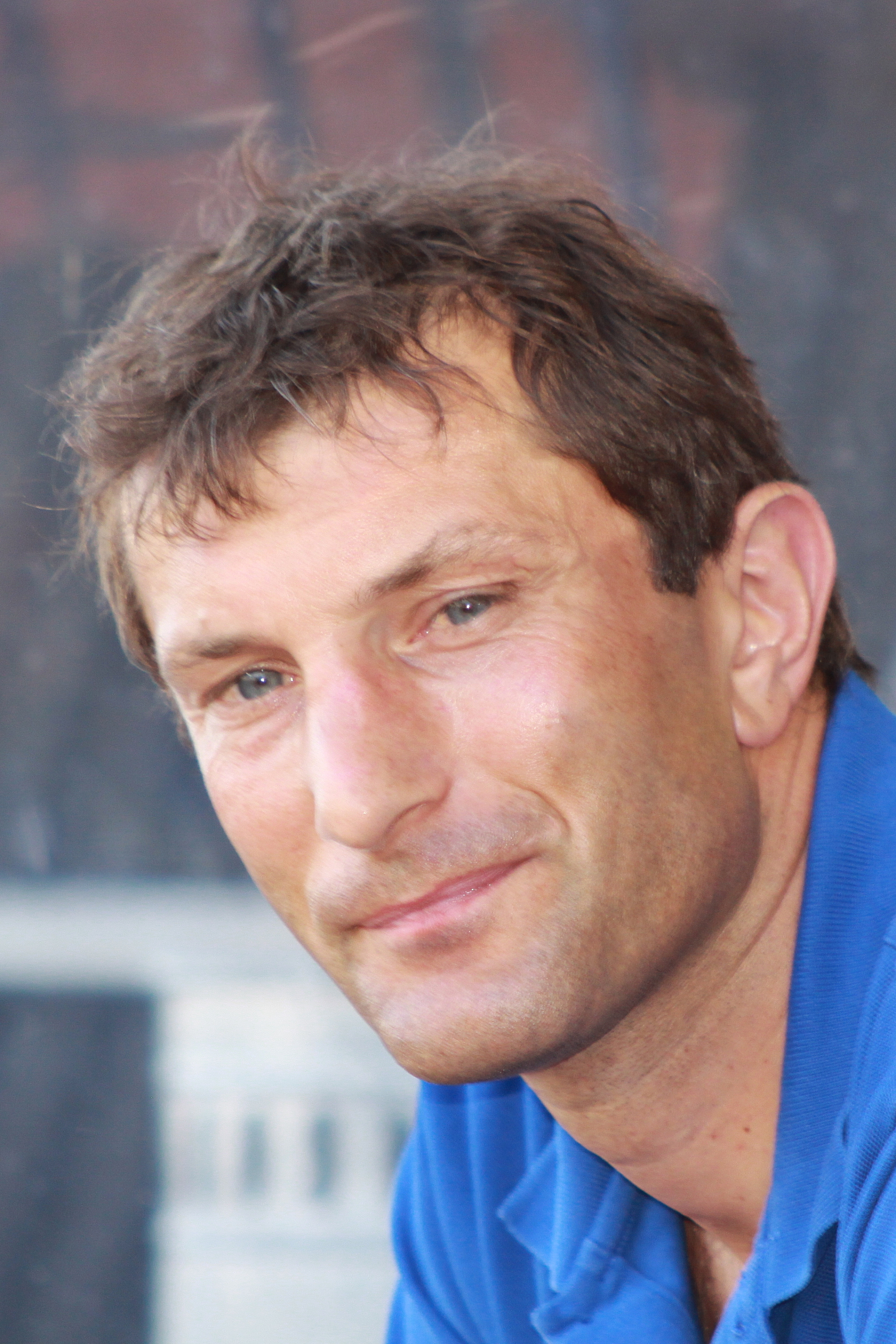

Personal information
- Date of birth: 12 December 1967 (age 58)
- Place of birth: Wolfsberg, Carinthia, Austria
- Height: 1.84 m (6 ft 1/2 in)
- Position: Defender

Youth career
- St. Michael im Lavanttal
- Wolfsberger AC

Senior career*
Years	Team	Apps	(Gls)
1987–1992	SK Sturm Graz	62	(6)
1992–1996	FK Austria Wien	137	(7)
1996–1998	SV Austria Salzburg	55	(6)
1998	AS Cannes	11	(0)
1998	LASK Linz	14	(1)
1999–2002	FC Tirol Innsbruck	110	(2)
2002–2004	FC Kärnten	58	(0)
Total		447	(22)

International career
1991–2001	Austria	28	(1)

Managerial career
- 2007–2008: DSV Leoben
- 2008–2012: FC Wacker Innsbruck
- 2013–2015: FC Rot-Weiß Erfurt
- * Club domestic league appearances and goals

Walter Kogler (born 12 December 1967) is a retired Austrian football player.

== Club career ==
A central defender, Kogler started his professional career at SK Sturm Graz and also played for clubs such as FK Austria Wien, SV Austria Salzburg, LASK Linz and FC Tirol Innsbruck. He had a short spell abroad, playing 11 games in the French League for AS Cannes.

== International career ==
He made his debut for Austria in a September 1991 friendly match against Portugal, in which he immediately scored a goal. He also was a participant at the 1998 FIFA World Cup. He earned 28 caps, scoring once. His last international was a September 2001 World Cup qualification match against Bosnia and Herzegovina.

=== International goals ===
Scores and results list Austria's goal tally first.

No	Date	Venue	Opponent	Score	Result	Competition
1.	4 September 1991	Estádio das Antas, Porto, Portugal	Portugal	1–1	1–1	Friendly match

== Honours ==
- Austrian Football Bundesliga:
  - 1993, 1997, 2000, 2001, 2002
- Austrian Cup:
  - 1994
