= Christian Prawda =

Austrian footballer

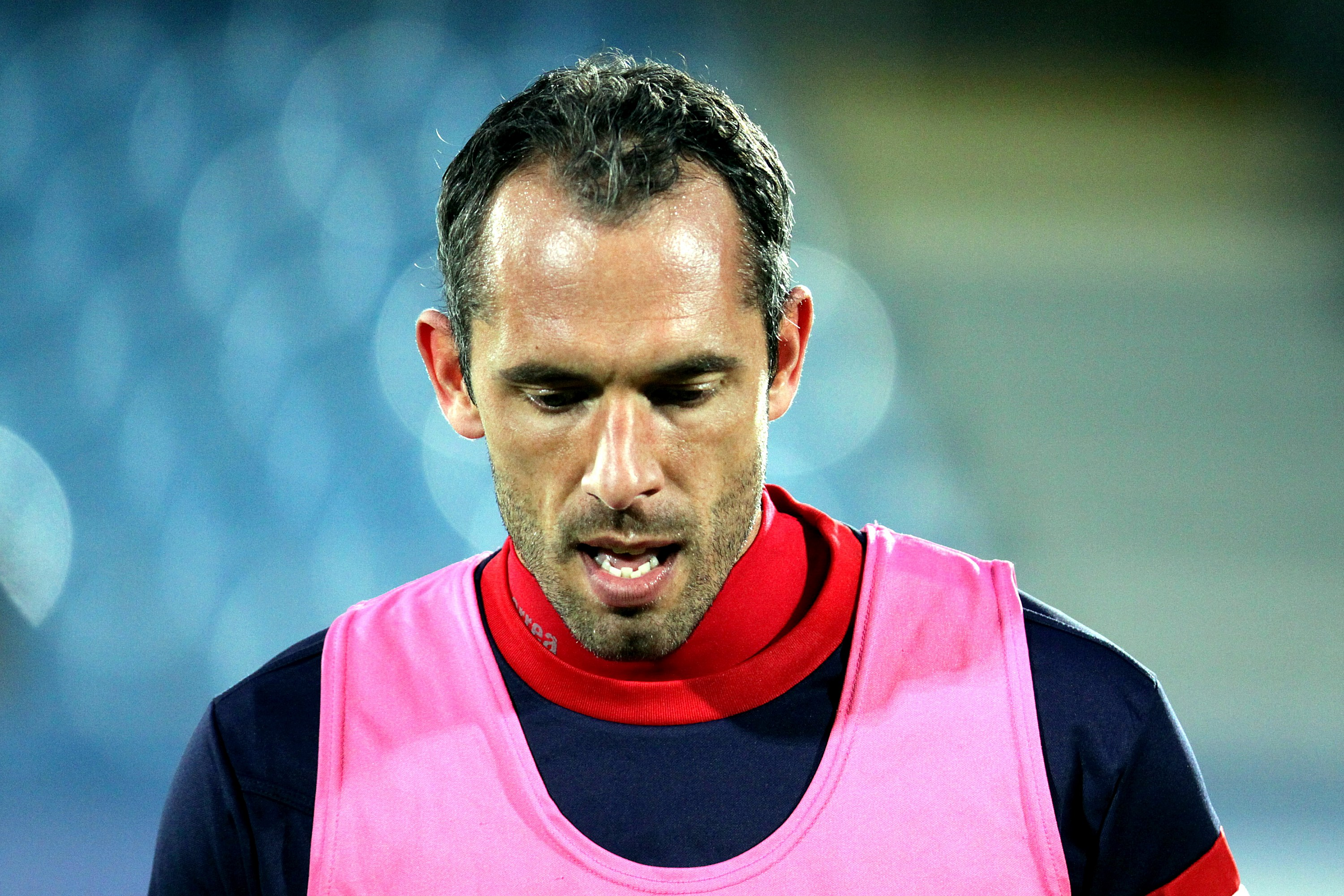
- Prawda in 2015

Personal information
- Date of birth: August 6, 1982 (age 44)
- Place of birth: Wolfsberg, Austria
- Height: 1.86 m (6 ft 1 in)
- Position: Left back

Team information
- Current team: SV Austria Klagenfurt
- Number: 16

Youth career
- 1988–1999: Annabichler SV
- 1999–2000: FC Kärnten

Senior career*
| Years | Team | Apps | (Gls) |
| 2000–2002 | BSV Juniors Villach | 22 | (0) |
| 2000–2007 | FC Kärnten | 110 | (4) |
| 2007–2009 | SK Austria Kärnten | 70 | (1) |
| 2010 | SK Sturm Graz | 11 | (0) |
| 2010–2011 | SV Austria Klagenfurt | 30 | (1) |
| 2011–2013 | Villacher SV | 53 | (2) |
| 2013– | SV Austria Klagenfurt | 64 | (1) |
- * Club domestic league appearances and goals as of 31 May 2016

Christian Prawda (born 6 August 1982 in Wolfsberg) is an Austrian football player who plays for SV Austria Klagenfurt.

== Career ==
He formerly played for FC Kärnten and ASV in Klagenfurt.
