= Úrsula Heinze =

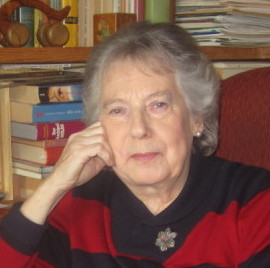
Úrsula Heinze de Lorenzo

Úrsula Heinze de Lorenzo (born in Cologne, Germany on 18 June 1941) is a writer and translator in Galician and German residing in Galicia. Her extensive literary works include poetry, novels, essays, short stories and children's literature. She moved from Germany to Galicia in 1968. She has worked for the Radio Galega Compañía de Radio Televisión de Galicia and El Correo Gallego and is a former president of the PEN club of Galicia.
