= Heinz Kurschildgen =

German fraudster

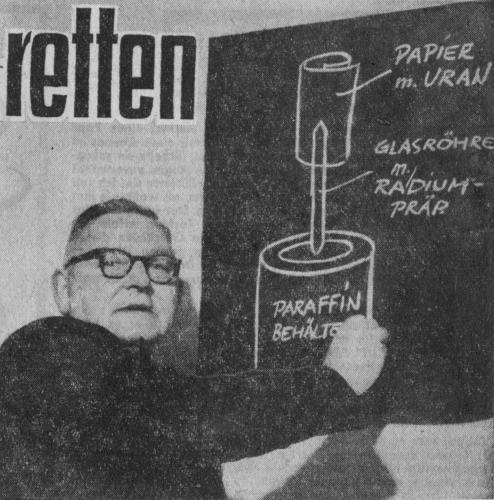
Heinz Kurschildgen with a diagram of his radium-making machine in a 1920s press photograph.

Heinrich "Heinz" Kurschildgen, called the "goldmaker of Hilden", was a charlatan in pre-World War II Germany. He fooled numerous people, including Nazi leader Heinrich Himmler, into believing that he was able to make valuable resources such as gold, radium or petrol out of base materials.

== Weimar Republic: gold and radium ==
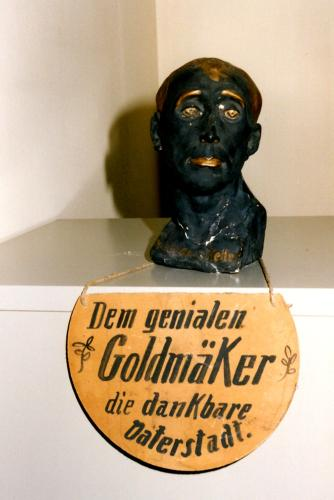
"To the genius gold-maker, his grateful home town": The bust to Kurschildgen installed in Hilden.

In 1914, the young Kurschildgen began an apprenticeship in a dye factory in Hilden, Germany. Fascinated by the chemicals he worked with, he cobbled together a chemical laboratory of his own and after a short time claimed to have made numerous sensational discoveries. He convinced several investors that he had found a way to make gold, and was prosecuted for fraud in 1922. Kurschildgen was, however, found to be not criminally responsible because of dementia praecox, and the case was dismissed on the condition that Kurschildgen stop approaching investors with gold-making schemes.

Complying with this restriction, Kurschildgen then began claiming that he was able to synthesize radium, a very rare and expensive radioactive element. He demonstrated his "transmutation" of uranium oxide into radium to physicists of the University of Cologne, but declined to explain his procedure. When the newspapers took up his claims, the Physikalisch-Technische Reichsanstalt examined them and found them to be fraudulent. In May 1928, as a result of the publicity Kurschildgen now enjoyed, the apothecary of his hometown Hilden had a bust of Kurschildgen installed in town, mockingly dedicated to the "genius goldmaker".

In 1929, Kurschildgen returned to the gold-making business. He unsuccessfully contacted the German president Paul von Hindenburg as well as Reichsbank president Hjalmar Schacht with proposals to manufacture gold to pay back Germany's World War I reparations. With private backers, Kurschildgen had more success, obtaining an advance of 100,000 ℛ︁ℳ︁ from a Cologne businessman and an offer of 1 million ℛ︁ℳ︁ from an American millionaire called Harris. In 1930, 15 of his defrauded clients brought criminal charges against him, and after being found criminally responsible (if "not very intelligent") this time, he was convicted to 18 months imprisonment. The news of his trial and conviction was reported as far away as Australia.

== Nazi Germany: petrol ==
After his release from prison, Kurschildgen sought the attention of the new Nazi government with claims of being able to make petrol from water. He was visited by Wilhelm Keppler, Hitler's scientific advisor, and agreed to reveal his methods to the Reichspatentamt as well as to surrender the exclusive rights to his invention to the government. After his claims seized the interest of high-ranking Nazis such as Werner Best and SS leader Heinrich Himmler, the Gestapo received a warning that Kurschildgen was prone to "fantastic experiments". He was visited by party leaders in his laboratory, who were not convinced by his petrol-making apparatus, and ordered the inventor with all his machinery to be moved to the Physikalisch-Technische Reichsanstalt in Berlin.

After the physicists of the Reichsanstalt declared his contraption to be useless, Kurschildgen became a factor in Party intrigues. Joseph Goebbels sneered in a diary entry of 27 January 1935:

"Himmler ist auf einen Gold- und Benzinmacher Kurschildgen hereingefallen. Wollte mich auch beschwindeln. Ich hab ihn gleich erkannt."
(Himmler fell for a gold and petrol maker, Kurschildgen. He wanted to defraud me, too. I recognized him at once.)

Kurschildgen was detained at the Columbia-Haus concentration camp in 1936, and sentenced by a criminal court to three years of imprisonment. He was released early for "diligence and good behavior" in 1938, but was soon rearrested on Himmler's orders, who feared that Kurschildgen would reveal his involvement with the SS and thereby embarrass Himmler. Kurschildgen however successfully petitioned Gestapo head Reinhard Heydrich to obtain his definitive release.

== After the war: attempts at rehabilitation ==
After the end of World War II, Kurschildgen unsuccessfully sought to be recognized as a victim of Nazi persecution, claiming that "the Gestapo would stop at nothing to get at my invention". He retained his old acquaintance Werner Best as legal counsel, whom he had supported in de-Nazification proceedings by testifying to Best's good conduct towards detainees.

Best proposed requesting a pardon for the 1936 conviction, which Kurschildgen refused. Kurschildgen then spent years trying to have his conviction overturned, which the Oberlandesgericht Düsseldorf ultimately declined to do.
