= Heinz Alt =

German composer

- Born: 1922
- Died: 6 January 1945 (aged 22–23)
- Occupation: composer

Heinz Alt (1922 – 6 January 1945) was a German composer and one of the Jewish victims of Nazi regime.

== Biography ==
Few facts are known about Alt, who worked in Theresienstadt concentration camp together with Victor Ullmann, Gideon Klein, Pavel Haas, Hans Krása and others. In June 1943, he arrived at Theresienstadt from Ostrava. His participation in the musical culture there comes from his "Six Miniatures for the Piano" in the second of the Studio for New Music concerts under the direction of Victor Ullman. It is also known that he composed an accompaniment to Smetana's "The Bohemian Song" which was written for the 60th anniversary of Smetana's death in 1944. In September 1944, Alt was deported to Auschwitz and briefly after that to Dachau, where he died on January 6, 1945.

== Sources ==
- Jascha Nemtsov, Beate Schroder-Nauenburg: "Musik im Inferno des Nazi-Terrors: Jüdische Komponisten im 'Dritten Reich'", en: Acta Musicologica, Vol. 70, Fasc. 1 (enero-junio de 1998), pp. 22–44
