= Viktor Hintz =

Finnish politician

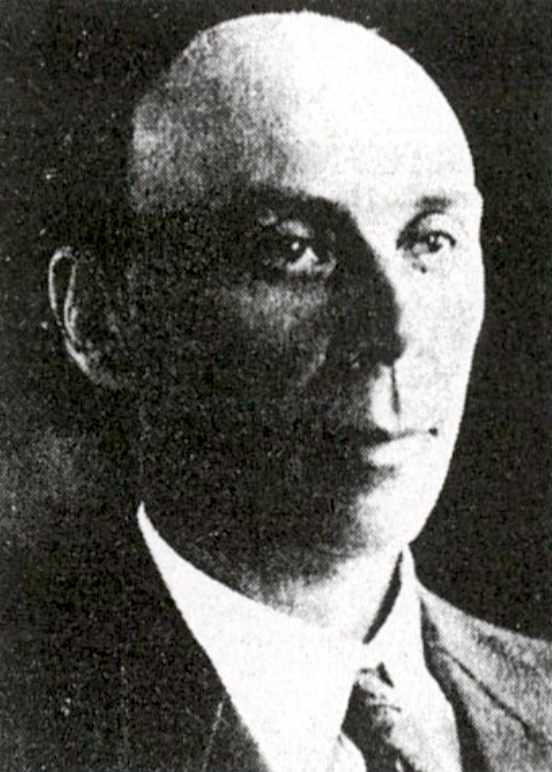
Viktor Hintz

Karl Viktor Hintz (10 April 1888, Tjöck - 7 June 1972; surname until 1921 Eriksson) was a Finnish farmer and politician. He was a member of the Parliament of Finland from 1929 to 1930, representing the Swedish People's Party of Finland (SFP).
