= Johann-Peter Hinz =

German sculptor and politician

Johann-Peter Hinz (18 March 1941 – 11 February 2007) was a German artist and sculptor and local politician in Saxony-Anhalt.

== Life ==
Hinz was born in 1941 in Kolberg, where his father Paulus Hinz was pastor at the cathedral. Several artists descended from the Hinz family, the elder brother being the sculptor Erdmann-Michael Hinz (1933–1950), the younger brother is the metal sculptor Jörg-Tilmann Hinz, his nephews are the sculptors Michael Weihe, Christoph Weihe and Daniel Priese.

In 1946, his father got a job at the Halberstadt Cathedral, which is why the family moved there. There he first attended the Martineum (cathedral and council grammar school) and studied metal design from 1965 to 1970 (among others with Irmtraud Ohme) at the Burg Giebichenstein University of Art and Design. His eldest brother Christoph Hinz (1928 - 1991) was student pastor of the Evangelische Studierendengemeinde (term 1955–1963), which was then based in the former Freiweltliches adeliges von Jena'sches Fräuleinstift of the Saale city. Hinz regularly attended the Halle Protestant Student Congregation during his studies under his brother's successor, student pastor Rudolf Schulze (tenure 1964–1970).

Hinz remained connected to Halberstadt throughout his life. In the 2002 television film Von Quedlinburg nach Halberstadt, the Mitteldeutscher Rundfunk showed him at work in his home town and gave him a chance to talk about his professional and voluntary work, and this film was broadcast several times.

As a convinced Christian, a metal designer and committed politician, Hinz campaigned for the preservation of Halberstadt's old town. In 1989, he was a co-initiator of the peaceful revolution in the city. After 1989, he became president of the city parliament. In 1992, he was honoured with the Federal Cross of Merit on ribbon for his commitment and his outstanding role as an initiator in the reconstruction of the city centre. In 2001 he became honorary citizen Halberstadt.

Hinz died in Halberstadt at the age of 65.

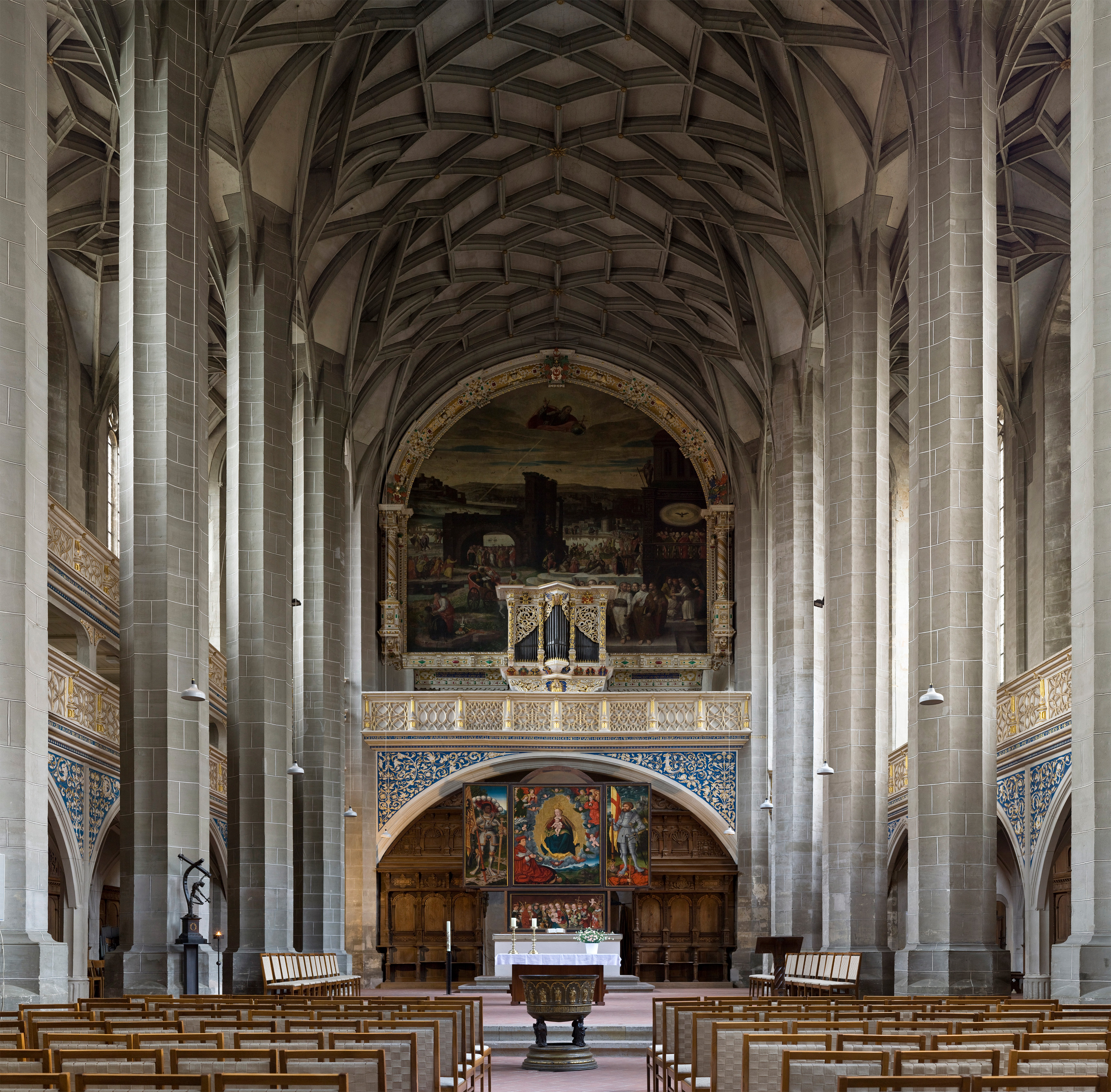
MarienkircheHalle Innenraum

== Work ==
- Crucifix in the Marktkirche Unser Lieben Frauen Halle (1976)
- Müntzer-Denkmal im Hof der Festung Heldrungen (1976), together with the painter and sculptor Hans-Hermann Richter
