= Hinz =

Hinz may refer to:

- Hinz, Iran, a village in Qazvin Province
- Hinz BLT-ARA, a German aircraft design
- Freddi Hinz, satirical character of Viktor Giacobbo

== People ==
- Hinz (surname)

== See also ==
- Heinz (disambiguation)
