= Miiko Hintz =

Finnish ice hockey player

- Born: September 27, 1992 (age 33) Nokia, Finland
- Height: 6 ft 1 in (185 cm)
- Weight: 157 lb (71 kg; 11 st 3 lb)
- Position: Right wing
- Shot: Left
- Played for: Ilves
- NHL draft: Undrafted
- Playing career: 2011–2017

Miiko Hintz (born September 27, 1992) is a Finnish former professional ice hockey player.

Hintz made his SM-liiga debut playing with Ilves during the 2011–12 SM-liiga season.

He is an older brother of fellow ice hockey player Roope Hintz.
