= Motorola Hint QA30 =

Mobile phone introduced by Motorola

- Manufacturer: Motorola
- Type: mobile/cellular
- Series: Motorola Hint QA30
- Compatible networks: CDMA 1x EVDO 1700/2100/800/1900
- Form factor: Slider
- Dimensions: 61.6 mm × 82 mm × 16.9 mm (2.43 in × 3.23 in × 0.67 in)
- Weight: 4.23 oz (120 g)
- Memory: 256 ROM and 128 MB RAM
- Removable storage: Up to 8 GB
- Battery: Li-ion4.5 Hours of Talk Time
- Rear camera: 2-megapixel, no flash
- Display: QVGA; 2.5", 320 x 240 pixels
- Connectivity: Stereo Bluetooth technology Micro USB 2.0 high speed GPS Enabled

The Motorola Hint QA30 is a sliding mobile camera phone introduced by Motorola in the fourth quarter of 2008. It was available on Alltel, Bell Canada, Cricket, MetroPCS, and US Cellular. Its 3G mobile network connectivity via CDMA2000 is no longer supported by carriers. About the size of a Post-It note, the QA30 slides open to reveal a full QWERTY keyboard for text messaging and email. The 2 megapixel camera stores 1600x1200 resolution pictures on either the 128 MB internal memory or on a MicroSD card up to 8 GB.

== Features ==
The front of the QA30 has a 2.5-inch (64 mm) color screen. The front has few buttons including a "Call" and "End" button, Media Player button, Back button and Menu navigation buttons. The Keypad Lock button is located on the top of the unit. Sliding the unit open reveals a full QWERTY Keyboard, and shortcut buttons for features such as the camera, speakerphone, web browser, and email.

The camera is capable of capturing 2-megapixel JPEG still images and MPEG-4 video. The phone is also capable of alerting the user by announcing the name of the person calling if the contact's number has been previously entered in the units contact list. It comes with 31 pre-installed ring tones and has the capability of purchasing/downloading more ring tones from the internet. It also includes an MP3 player.

== Notes and references ==
=== Reviews ===
http://reviews.cnet.com/cell-phones/motorola-hint-qa30-cricket/4505-6454_7-33660851.html
