= Gerald Lembke =

German business economist

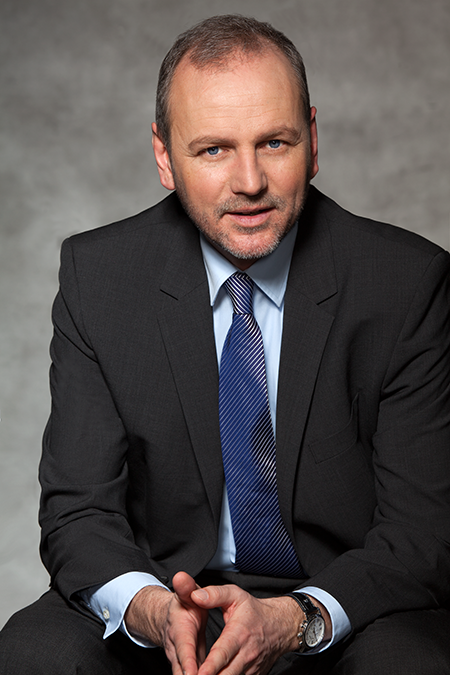
- Lembke in 2013
- Born: 30 April 1966 (age 59); Wolfsburg, Lower Saxony, Germany
- Education: Abitur
- Occupations: Business economist; author
- Website: Official website (in German)

Gerald Lembke (born 30 April 1966) is a German business economist with focus on digital media and an author of non-fiction.

== Life ==
Gerald Lembke was born on 30 April 1966 in Wolfsburg, Lower Saxony, Germany.

After graduating from the Anna-Sophianeum-Gymnasium in Schöningen in Lower Saxony and training as an industrial clerk, Lembke studied business education and economics at the Carl von Ossietzky University in Oldenburg. As a student, Lembke founded the mediana Internet agency GbR in 1994, of which he was a partner until 1999, and then sold. In 1996 he completed his studies as a qualified commercial teacher and in 1998 he completed a six-month training course as a change manager at the Academy for Business Executives in Bad Harzburg, where he worked as a product manager, project manager and management assistant. From there, he switched to Bertelsmann, where he received further training as a project manager at the internal Bertelsmann Corporate University. His work at Bertelsmann, at Gabler Verlag in Wiesbaden ended in 2000. As an independent management consultant, Lembke was managing director of his own consulting company LearnAct! based in Wiesbaden from 1999 to 2007. He founded the LearnAct! Verlagsgesellschaft, a digital publisher that merged with the management consultancy into a GmbH in 2002. From 2000 to 2002 he trained as a "systemic organizational consultant" and NLP practitioner. In 2005 he received his doctorate in business administration on organizational development with the subject "Knowledge cooperation in knowledge communities" with Uwe Schneidewind. Lembke held a teaching position at the AKAD Bildungsgesellschaft in Frankfurt from 2000 to 2004, and from 2005 at the Wiesbaden University of Applied Sciences. In 2007 Lembke became professor for business administration and media management at the Mannheim University of Cooperative Education. As head of the course and dean of studies, he has been responsible for academic training in the digital media course at the Baden-Württemberg Cooperative State University in Mannheim since 2009. In 2008 the LearnAct! Corporate development and publishing company relocated from Wiesbaden to Heidelberg. In 2012 the headquarters were relocated to Weinheim and the company was renamed the Institut für Medien GmbH. Lembke has written several books on knowledge management and digital media. In 2012 he founded the Federal Association for Media and Marketing in Mannheim. Since then he has been president of the association. Here he campaigns for the professionalization of digital media in business practice.

== Reception ==
Lembke received media attention with his book Die Lüge der digitalen Bildung: Warum unsere Kinder das Lernen verlernen (The Lie of Digital Education: Why Our Children Unlearn How To Learn). Norbert Neuß, professor of pedagogy and didactics at the University of Gießen, criticized Lembke's theses about the learning behavior of children as „Unsinn“ ("nonsense").

== Publications (selection) ==
- Die lernende Organisation als Grundlage einer entwicklungsfähigen Unternehmung. Tectum Verlag 2001, ISBN 978-3-8288-8712-1.
- Wissenskooperation in Wissensgemeinschaften. Initiative und Förderung der Wissensteilung in Organisation. LearnAct Verlag, Wiesbaden 2005, ISBN 978-3-938627-00-6.
- Wissensnetzwerke. Grundlagen-Anwendungsfelder-Praxisberichte. LearnAct Verlag, Wiesbaden 2006, ISBN 978-3-938627-02-0.
- with Fabian Reinfeldt: Organisation und Management in mittelständischen Unternehmen. LearnAct Verlag, Wiesbaden 2007, ISBN 978-3-938627-03-7.
- Social Media Marketing. Analyse, Konzeption, Strategien, Umsetzung. Cornelsen Verlag, Berlin 2011, ISBN 978-3-589-23908-5.
- with Nadine Soyez: Digitale Medien im Unternehmen: Perspektiven des betrieblichen Einsatzes von neuen Medien. Springer Verlag, Heidelberg 2012, ISBN 978-3-642-29905-6.
- with Ingo Leipner: Zum Frühstück gibt's Apps: Der tägliche Kampf mit der Digitalen Ambivalenz. Springer Science Verlag, Heidelberg 2014, ISBN 978-3-662-43401-7.
- with Ingo Leipner: Die Lüge der digitalen Bildung: Warum unsere Kinder das Lernen verlernen. Redline Verlag, München 2015, ISBN 978-3-86881-568-9.
- Im digitalen Hamsterrad: Ein Plädoyer für den gesunden Umgang mit Smartphone & Co. medhochzwei Verlag, Heidelberg 2016, ISBN 978-3-86216-302-1.
- Verzockte Zukunft: Wie wir das Potenzial der jungen Generation verspielen. Weinheim 2019, ISBN 978-3-407-86557-1.
- with Nadine Soyez: Digitale Fitness für Führungskräfte: Praxiswissen, Skills und Checklisten für die neue hybride Arbeitswelt. REDLINE Verlag, München 2021, ISBN 978-3868818451.
