= Heinz Chapel Choir =

American university a cappella choir

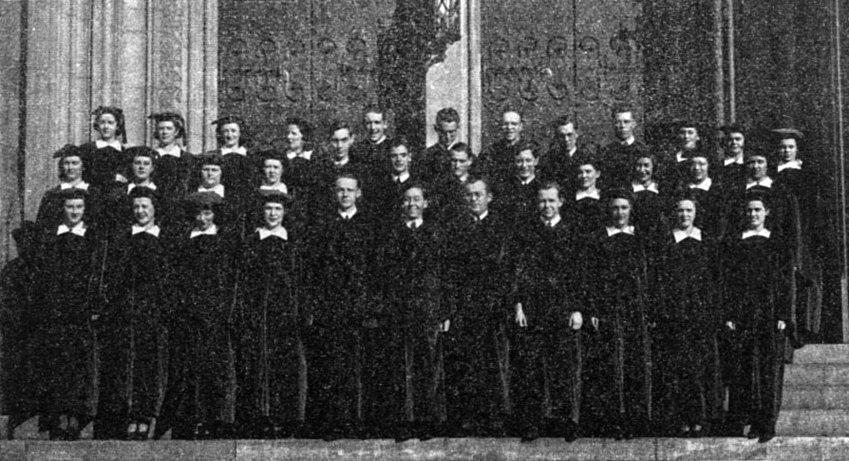
The Heinz Chapel Choir on the steps of Heinz Memorial Chapel during the 1938-39 school year, the first year the chapel was opened

The Heinz Chapel Choir is an internationally known mixed a cappella choir from the University of Pittsburgh founded in 1938 which draws its members from the university's student body. Performances are given in the Heinz Memorial Chapel. The group was first founded as the school's A Capella Choir; it became the official chapel choir when Heinz Chapel was opened in 1938, thus changing its name accordingly. The choir has been performing for over 80 years, becoming a signature part the Heinz Memorial Chapel. It is currently under the direction of Dr. Susan Rice after the retirement of John Goldsmith in 2014 following 25 years of conducting.

In addition to regular performances in Pittsburgh, the Heinz Chapel Choir regularly undertakes domestic and international tours. In spring of 2017, the choir embarked on a tour throughout the United Kingdom. Previous international tours have included: The Balkans (2014); China and Hong Kong; Peru and Bolivia in 2012; Brazil (2006); Italy and Croatia (2001); Spain and France (1998); Greece and Italy (1995); Germany, Poland, Hungary, Czechoslovakia, Austria, and Switzerland (1992); Belgium, Ireland, and a 14 city tour of France (1984), France (1982, 1980 and 1978); and England, France, and Italy (1974). The choir has also toured domestically throughout the United States, airing on a national radio broadcast from Washington, D.C., and appearing at the White House. Other notable past performances range from singing for world leaders Pope Paul VI and Helmut Schmidt, to accompanying performances of the Pittsburgh Ballet Theatre, and appearing in a concert with Duke Ellington. In the 1950s, the choir had its own Sunday television show air for five years on KDKA-TV, and its predecessor WDTV, in Pittsburgh.

== Recordings ==
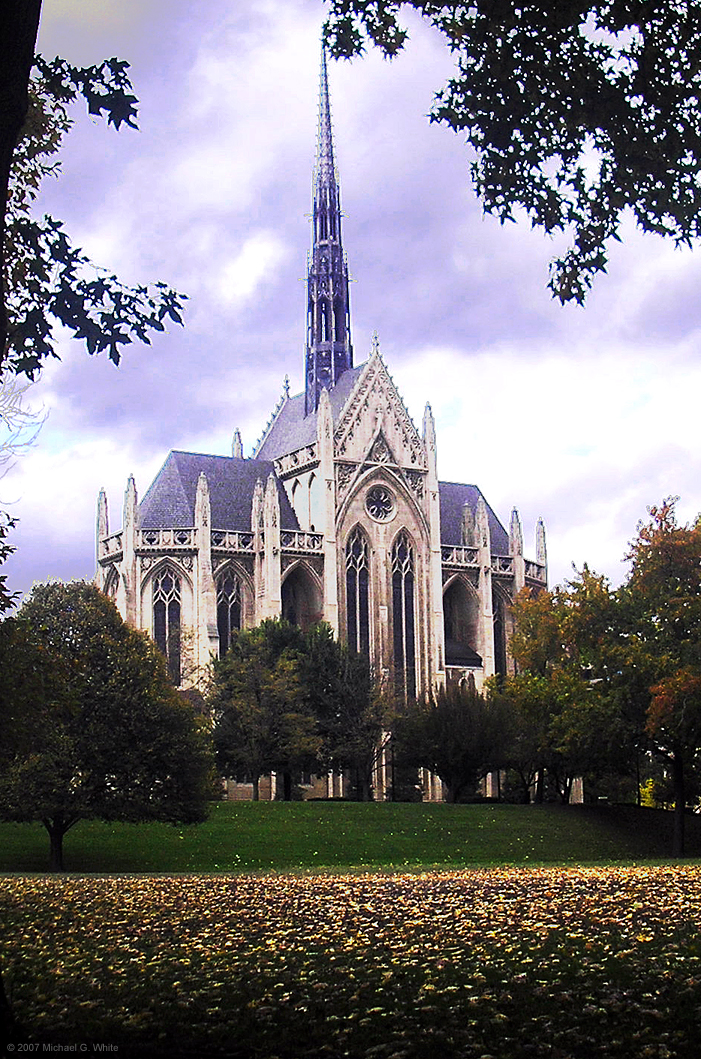
Heinz Chapel at the University of Pittsburgh

The Heinz Chapel Choir has recorded several CDs:

- Heinz Chapel Choir Christmas, 1999
- A Cappella Music of the Americas
- 2001 Adriatic Odyssey, 2001
- Viking Adventure, 2003
- "Blame it on Rio" Tour, 2006
- Christmas in Heinz Chapel, 2007
- Great Wall Tour, 2009
