= Heinz Fiedler =

- Born: 29 April 1929; Leubnitz (Zwickau), Saxony, Germany
- Died: 15 December 1993 (aged 64); Berlin, Germany
- Occupation: Major general (Stasi)

Heinz Fiedler (29 April 1929 – 15 December 1993) was a major general in East Germany's Ministry for State Security (Stasi). Between 1970 and 1990 he was in charge of the organisation's Department VI which gave him responsibility for border security and tourist traffic. In December 1993 he hanged himself.

== Life ==
Fiedler was born six months before the Wall Street crash heralded worldwide economic retrenchment: he was born and grew up in Leubnitz, an industrial quarter of Zwickau. His father was a fitter and his mother was a weaver. On leaving primary school he embarked on a successful period of study at a commercially focused "Handelsschule". However, war had broken out in 1939, and in 1945 he was conscripted for Labour service which, at this point in the war, meant the army. His short career as a soldier ended with a spell as an American prisoner of war.

War ended in May 1945 and Fiedler, remaining in the region of his birth, took a job as an assistant mechanic with the Siemens factory in Werdau. In 1946 he entered an apprenticeship with the Social Insurance Office in Zwickau, for which he subsequently worked as an employee. Although the Americans had reached Zwickau in the final stages of the war, the leading winning powers had already agreed new frontiers and military occupation zones for Germany, and the Americans withdrew to Bavaria after a few weeks leaving the entire central portion of what had been Germany administered as the Soviet occupation zone. In 1946 Heinz Fiedler joined, briefly, the German Communist Party. Politically there had initially been a widespread belief that military defeat, by destroying the Hitler regime, had put an end to one-party government in Germany, and in the summer As matters turned out, 1946 was also the year in which the basis for a return to one-party government was established, with the contentious merger, in April of that year, of the Communist Party and, within the Soviet occupation zone, of the more moderately left-wing Social Democratic Party, forming together the Socialist Unity Party (SED / Sozialdemokratische Partei Deutschlands). Heinz Fiedler, like many German communists, lost little time in signing his party membership over to the new SED. In 1949 he took a clerical job with the "Ernst Grube" truck and bus factory in Werdau, where he also became Secretary of the Free German Youth, which was the youth wing of the ruling SED party in what had become, in October 1949, the German Democratic Republic, comprising the entire area that had previously been administered as the Soviet Occupation zone. The young country retained Soviet military and political sponsorship, and many of its constitutional arrangements and political power structures were directly modeled on those of the Soviet Union. In 1952 Fiedler switched to the Zwickau district office of the Ministry for State Security. In 1954 he was transferred to Department II (Counterespionage) of the Stasi regional leadership in Karl-Marx-Stadt (as Chemnitz was then known).

He was promoted in 1958, becoming the department head. Then, between 1960 and 1965, he undertook a correspondence study course at the Ministry's own Academy for State Security at Potsdam-Eiche. His study was concluded in June 1965 when he received a degree for a 107-page dissertation on the theme: "The relationship of the Structural Plan, Operational Plan and Organisational Directives in General, with particular reference to the importance of Operational Duties and Rights, and of the Division of Responsibility for Management Activities in the Ministry for State Security" Long before completing his degree, in 1961 Heinz Fiedler was appointed deputy head of Operations for the Karl-Marx-Stadt region. Then, from 1968, he was department head of the Permanent Operational Staff of the Ministry for State Security nationally, before in 1970 taking charge of the organisation's Department VI which gave him responsibilities that included passport control and oversight of cross border travel (including entry and exit permits and transit traffic). By 1989 the department employed 2,025 people. As the senior officer in charge of border control he was also responsible for radio-active (and at the time secret) systems that employed traditional X-ray technology to search vehicles entering or leaving the country.

Fiedler and his colleague Rolf Fister were among nine Stasi officers who in 1975 received a doctorate for work on the theme: "Organisation of Prevention and Detection of Illegal Departures from the German Democratic Republic and the Struggle against anti-state People Trafficking" Fiedler was promoted to the rank of major general in 1975. In 1977/78 he undertook a study year at the Central Committee "Karl Marx" Party Academy.

In 1985 he was awarded the Patriotic Order of Merit (gold). In November 1989 the breach of the Berlin Wall and the absence of a military response from the Soviet Union triggered a succession of events that led to German reunification in October 1990. One of the changes involved the dissolution of the East German Ministry for State Security: like many colleagues, Heinz Fiedler was relieved of his duties in January 1990 and went into retirement.

Heinz Fiedler was arrested on 1 December 1993 on suspicion of inciting the murder of Wolfgang Welsch, a Berlin activist who had helped people to escape from the German Democratic Republic. Two weeks later, on 15 December 1993, Fiedler committed suicide while on remand in the prison at Moabit in Berlin. His funeral was attended by numerous formerly high ranking Stasi officers including Wolfgang Schwanitz, Gerhard Neiber, Rudi Mittig and Werner Großmann.
