= Nathan Heinze =

American house music producer

Nathan Heinze is an American house music and synthpop record producer from Miami, Florida, United States. His music is similar to that of the Pet Shop Boys and New Order.

== Career ==
In the late 1990s and early 2000s, Heinze produced several eurodance and tribal tracks, but later work showed an electro and progressive house influence. His song "At the Disco" charted at No. 6 on InternetDJ.com. After the success of "At the Disco", he began collaborating with Miami DJ VButterfly. The most notable tracks the two released were a dance cover of "Lovesong" by The Cure, and "Stupid Prick", a minor hit released by Decibel Records NYC. Heinze also worked with singer Vanessa Valentin (known primarily for her work in commercials for Pantene and Honda) on two tracks, "Maldita Condena" and "I'm Leavin".

In 2007, he wrote and produced two tracks for the European charity album Philanthropy, and also remixed two other songs from the album ("Fanatic Boy" by KooLTURE and "Rumor" by Ray Grant). In 2007, Heinze also remixed KooLTURE's hit "Stupid Superstar".

In 2008, he completed two remixes of the West End Girls' first single from their album Shoplifting. The track is entitled "What Have I Done to Deserve This?" and is a cover of the 1987 Pet Shop Boys hit. Heinze's remixes appear on the CD single (released by EMI), along with a radio mix and an instrumental mix. In November 2008, ISV Entertainment released Heinze's version of "It Doesn't Often Snow at Christmas" sung by West End Girls and found on the Super Dance Christmas Party release.
