= Health Information National Trends Survey =

The Health Information National Trends Survey (HINTS) is a cross-sectional, nationally representative survey of American adults sponsored by the National Cancer Institute. HINTS provides publicly available data on American adults' knowledge of, attitudes toward, and behaviors related to cancer prevention, control and communication. Researchers use the data to identify trends in health communication, including how people find cancer information, which sources they use, their feelings about the search process, and how they perceive cancer overall.

For example, HINTS data users have examined how adults 18 years and older use different communication channels (e.g., the Internet) to obtain vital health information for themselves and their loved ones. They've also analyzed the experiences people have when they search for cancer information. Program planners can use the data to overcome barriers to health-information access and to obtain data to help them create more effective communication strategies. Social scientists can use the data to refine theories of health communication and to recommend methods to reduce the burden of cancer.

As a national-level surveillance vehicle for cancer and health communication, HINTS can make valuable contributions to the larger cyberinfrastructure devoted to health and may potentially be leveraged with other national-level surveys (e.g., The Centers for Disease Control and Prevention's Behavioral Risk Factors Surveillance Survey and National Health Interview Survey) to gauge the effects of policy changes on population health.

== HINTS Surveys ==
=== HINTS 1 (2003) ===
The first HINTS data were collected between October 2002 and April 2003 via a Random Digit Dial (RDD) telephone survey using a Computer Assisted Telephone Interview (CATI) format to accommodate complex skip-patterns based on respondent's answers. Data were collected from 6,369 respondents. The survey instruments are available in English and Spanish.

=== HINTS 2 (2005) ===
HINTS 2 data were collected from February 2005 through August 2005. HINTS 2005 also used RDD/CATI and identical data collection procedures. Data were collected from 5,586 respondents.

=== HINTS 3 (2008) ===
HINTS 3 data were collected from January 2008 through May 2008. The sample design for HINTS 2008 consisted of two samples with each sample selected from a separate sample frame. One sample used the same RDD/CATI methodology as prior surveys. Survey administration averaged 30 minutes per respondent. Data were collected from 4,092 respondents.

The second sample was selected from United States Postal Service address administrative records. After the CATI instrument was modified to produce a printed questionnaire, the survey and a cover letter were sent to the address sample. All adults at each sampled address were asked to return the completed questionnaire in a postage-paid envelope. Data were collected from 3,582 respondents. Data from both surveys became available for public use in February 2009 along with a final report.

The 2008 survey added questions about social media, personal health records, health services utilization, and patient provider communication.

=== HINTS Puerto Rico (2009) ===
HINTS researchers expanded to Puerto Rico in 2009. The University of Puerto Rico Comprehensive Cancer Center and the Puerto Rico Behavioral Risk Factors Surveillance System collaborated with the National Cancer Institute on the project. A total of 639 interviews were conducted (603 complete and 36 partially complete). Data and documentation as well as instructions on how to combine the data set with HINTS 2007 is available on the HINTS website.

=== HINTS 4, Cycle 1 (2011) ===
Data for cycle 1 were collected from October 2011 through February 2012. The sample design consisted of a single-mode mail survey, with two methods of respondent selection: the All Adult method and the Next Birthday method. The sampling consisted of a two-stage stratified sample of addresses used by Marketing Systems Group (MSG). In the All Adult method, two questionnaires were sent with each mailing, where all adults residing in a sampled household were asked to complete the questionnaire. In the next birthday method, one questionnaire was sent with each mailing so that the adult who would have the next birthday in the sampled household was asked to complete the questionnaire. Data were collected from 3,959 respondents. The methodology report, complete data set and the survey instruments are available on the HINTS website.

=== HINTS 4, Cycle 2 (2012) ===
Data for cycle 2 were collected from October 2012 through January 2013. The sample design consisted of a single-mode mail survey, using the Next Birthday method for respondent selection. It included two stages. In the first stage, a stratified sample of addresses was selected from a file of residential addresses. In the second-stage, one adult was selected within each sampled household. The sampling frame consisted of a database of addresses used by Marketing Systems Group (MSG) to provide random samples of addresses. Complete data were collected from 3,630 respondents. The methodology report, complete data set and the survey instruments are available on the HINTS website.

=== HINTS 4, Cycle 3 (2013) ===
Cycle 3 data were collected from September 2013 through December 2013. Like cycle 2, the sample design consisted of a single-mode mail survey that used the Next Birthday method for respondent selection. The sample design for this survey consisted of two-stages. In the first stage, a stratified sample of addresses was selected from a file of residential addresses. In the second-stage, one adult was selected within each sampled household. The sampling frame consisted of a database of addresses used by Marketing Systems Group (MSG) to provide random samples of addresses. Complete data were collected from 3,185 respondents. The methodology report, complete data set and the survey instruments are available on the HINTS website.

=== HINTS 4, Cycle 4 (2014) ===
Data were collected from August through November, 2014. The sample design for this cycle consisted of a single-mode mail survey, using the Next Birthday method for respondent selection. The sample design consisted of two-stages. In the first stage, a stratified sample of addresses was selected from a file of residential addresses. In the second-stage, one adult was selected within each sampled household. The sampling frame consisted of a database of addresses used by Marketing Systems Group (MSG) to provide random samples of addresses. Complete data were collected from 3,677 respondents. The methodology report, complete data set and the survey instruments are available on the HINTS website.

=== HINTS 5, Cycle 1 (2017) ===
Data were collected from January through May, 2017. The sample design for this cycle consisted of a single-mode mail survey, using the Next Birthday Method for respondent selection. The sample design consisted of two-stages. In the first stage, a stratified sample of addresses was selected from a file of residential addresses. In the second-stage, one adult was selected within each sampled household. The sampling frame consisted of a database of addresses used by Marketing Systems Group (MSG) to provide random samples of addresses. Complete data were collected from 3,191 respondents. The methodology report, complete data set and the survey instruments are available on the HINTS website.

=== HINTS 5, Cycle 2 (2018) ===
Data were collected from January through May, 2018. The sample design consisted of a single-mode mail survey, using the Next Birthday Method for respondent selection. The sample design consisted of two-stages. In the first stage, an equal-probability sample of addresses was selected from within each explicit sampling stratum. In the second-stage, one adult was selected within each sampled household. The sampling frame consisted of a database of addresses used by Marketing Systems Group (MSG) to provide random samples of addresses. Complete data were collected from 3,504 respondents. The methodology report, complete data set and the survey instruments are available on the HINTS website.

=== HINTS 5, Cycle 3 (2019) ===
Data were collected from January through May, 2019. The design consisted of two samples (the traditional HINTS mail survey and a push-to web pilot (Web Pilot). The sampling strategy consisted of a two-stage design. In the first stage, a stratified sample of addresses was selected from a file of residential addresses. In the second stage, one adult was selected within each sampled household using the Next Birthday method for respondent selection. The sampling frame consisted of a database of addresses used by Marketing Systems Group (MSG) to provide random samples of addresses. In the Web Pilot, respondents were offered the choice to respond via paper (in English or Spanish) or via a web survey (in English only). Complete data were collected from 5,247 respondents. The methodology report, complete data set and the survey instruments are available on the HINTS website.

=== HINTS 5, Cycle 4 (2020) ===
Data were collected from February through June, 2020. The sample design consisted of a single-mode mail survey, using the Next Birthday Method for respondent selection. The sample design consisted of two-stages. In the first stage, an equal-probability sample of addresses was selected from within each explicit sampling stratum. In the second-stage, one adult was selected within each sampled household. The sampling frame consisted of a database of addresses used by Marketing Systems Group (MSG) to provide random samples of addresses. Complete data were collected from 3,865 respondents. The complete data set and the survey instruments are available on the HINTS website.

=== HINTS Data Linkage Project 2020 (HDLP) ===
This project contains geo-coded, restricted, HINTS 5 Cycle 4 data linked—at the county level-- with over 70 external variables chosen from trusted and reliable sources including the U.S. Census, the Agency for Healthcare Research and Quality (AHRQ) and the US Department of Agriculture (USDA). The external variables fall into five categories: 1) Social and economic factors (e.g., Income inequality); 2) Demographics (e.g., Percent of population 65 or older); 3) Information technology (e.g., Percent of households with broadband internet); 4) Built environment (e.g., Fitness centers and recreational sports per 100,000 people); and 5) Physical environment (e.g., Percentage of days with good air quality). Given the geocodes and potential for disclosure, the HDLP is not a public-use data file and anyone interested in accessing the data will first need to apply to access the data via the HINTS restricted-use data request form. The survey instruments are available on the HINTS website.

=== HINTS-SEER (2021) ===
In 2021, NCI undertook a pilot project to oversample cancer survivors using three cancer registries from the Surveillance, Epidemiology, and End Results (SEER) Program (https://seer.cancer.gov) as a sampling frame of cancer survivors. The pilot project, called HINTS-SEER, was designed to provide a larger sample of cancer survivors for analyses. The instrument closely resembles survey items and topics found on HINTS 5, Cycle 4 (2020), and includes other topics relevant to cancer survivors. A unique aspect of the dataset is that key data elements from the cancer registry datasets are linked to the survey responses, providing a more in-depth view of each respondent's cancer diagnosis.

Data were collected from January 11, 2021 through August 20, 2021. Once the SEER registries obtained consent to share individual mailing addresses, the mailing protocol for all three cohorts (Iowa Cancer Registry, Greater Bay Area Cancer Registry, and New Mexico Tumor Registry) followed a modified Dillman approach (Dillman, et al., 2009) with a total of four mailings: an initial mailing, a reminder postcard, and two follow-up mailings. Individuals in each sample received the first mailing and reminder postcard, while only non-respondents received the subsequent survey mailings. Complete data were collected from 1,234 respondents. The methodology report, complete data set and the survey instruments are available on the HINTS website.

=== HINTS 6 (2022) ===
Data were collected from March through November 2022. The design consisted of two modes, with respondents being offered a paper survey or web option. The sampling strategy consisted of a two-stage design. In the first stage, a stratified sample of addresses was selected from a file of residential addresses. In the second stage, one adult was selected within each sampled household. The sampling frame consisted of a database of addresses used by Marketing Systems Group (MSG) to provide random samples of addresses. A total of 6,252 surveys were included in the final dataset. The survey included an embedded methodological experiment comparing two mixed mode approaches: concurrent and sequential (also known as the control and treatment groups). Households in the concurrent (control) group received a cover letter with the link to the web survey and their unique access code as well as a paper survey with each mailing (including their first mailing). Households in the sequential (treatment) group received only a cover letter with the link to the web survey and their unique access code with their first mailing—they did not receive a paper survey in their first mailing. In subsequent mailings, these households received the link to the web survey and their unique access code as well as the paper survey. The methodology report, complete data set and the survey instruments are available on the HINTS website.

== HINTS knowledge products ==
Three categories of HINTS knowledge products are available: books/reports, HINTS briefs, and overview materials.

- Books and reports include a special issue devoted to HINTS research as well as reports that summarize the results of HINTS 2003 and 2005 and that explain analytic strategies for evaluating trends between iterations of the survey.
- HINTS Briefs provide two page high-level summaries of HINTS research and are usually based on a HINTS study that appears in the peer-reviewed literature. The briefs cover several topics, including sun safety, human papillomavirus, and cancer information seeking behaviors.

Finally, the HINTS overview materials include a HINTS brochure and a HINTS fact sheet. These overview materials can be useful to researchers presenting HINTS data at conferences when explaining their methodological approach.
