= Katja Lembke =

German classical archaeologist and Egyptologist (born 1965)

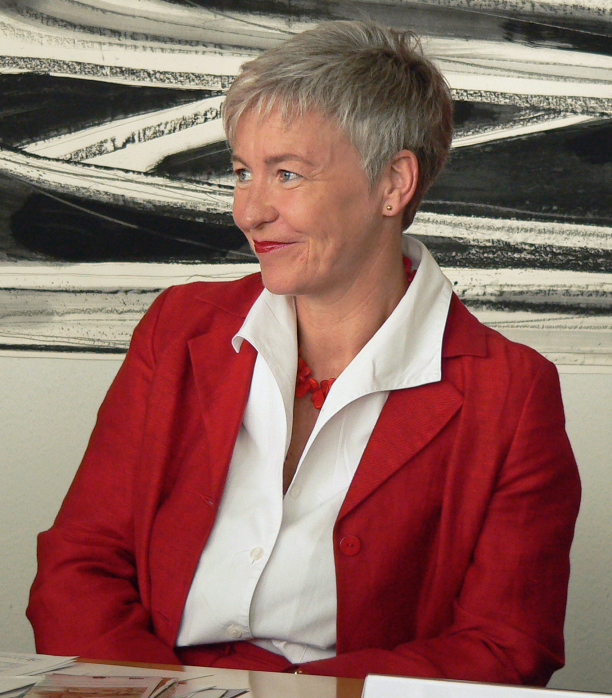
Lembke in 2012

Katja Lembke (born 1965) is a German classical archaeologist and Egyptologist and director of the Lower Saxony State Museum in Hanover.

== Career ==
Katja Lembke studied Classical Archeology, Egyptology, and Latin from 1984 to 1992 at the Leibniz College (Studium generale) at the University of Tübingen, at LMU Munich, the Sapienza University of Rome, and the Pontifical Gregorian University in Rome, and at Heidelberg University. In 1992, she received her doctorate at Heidelberg University with Tonio Hölscher with the dissertation Das Iseum Campense in Rome. In 1992 or 1993, she received a travel grant from the German Archaeological Institute. From 1994 to 1996, Lembke worked as an assistant at the Egyptian Museum Berlin. Then she headed a project to document the grave of Siamun in the Siwa oasis until 2000, followed by the research project "The sculptures from the spring shrine of Amrit / Western Syria" until 2003. In 2002, she also started coordinating the subproject “Egyptian Museum and Papyrus Collection” of the “Restoration and Building Clearance Pergamon Museum” project, which ran until 2004. From 2000 to 2003, she headed the research project “The favissa of the Herakles Melqart sanctuary in Amrit” within the framework of the DFG priority program “Forms and ways of acculturation in the eastern Mediterranean and the Black Sea region”. In 2002, Lembke began her two-year activity as an expert on Egyptian art Federal Office for Building and Regional Planning (BBR). Here she was in particular responsible for planning the restoration and clearing of the building of the Egyptian Museum in the Neues Museum. From 2005 to 2011, Lembke was executive director and managing director of the Roemer and Pelizaeus Museums Hildesheim GmbH. During her tenure, numerous cultural and historical exhibitions (including "Cult around the Ball" (2006), "Beauty in Ancient Egypt. Longing for Perfection" (2006/07), "Maya. Kings from the Rainforest" (2007/08), "Paradises of the South Seas. Myth and Reality" (2008/09), "Cyprus. Island of Aphrodite" (2010) and "Giza. At the foot of the great pyramids" (2011)) as well as the new installation of the Egyptian permanent exhibition planned and implemented. She also taught at times as a lecturer at the Institute for Classical Archeology at the University of Göttingen.

On 1 May 2011, she succeeded Jaap Brakke as director of the Lower Saxony State Museum in Hanover.

In 2004, she initiated the research and restoration project “The Petosiris Necropolis of Hermupolis / Tuna el-Gebel”, which was carried out by the DFG in 2004–2011, by the DAAD in 2011–2014, by the Volkswagen Foundation in 2015-2018 and again by the DFG since 2017 and is currently funded by the Federal Foreign Office. Lembke has been an honorary professor at the University of Göttingen since 2015, where she has been a lecturer since 2001. Since 2018 she has acted as the spokesperson for the research project "Provenance Research in Non-European Collections and Ethnology (PAESE) in Lower Saxony", which is funded by the Volkswagen Foundation and as a joint project with the Universities of Göttingen and Hanover, theState Museum "Natur und Mensch" Oldenburg, the Städtisches Museum Braunschweig, and the Roemer and Pelizaeus Museum Hildesheim.

Katja Lembke has been a corresponding member of the German Archaeological Institute since 2003, and in December 2021 she was appointed to the Historical Commission for Lower Saxony and Bremen. In June 2021, Katja Lembke was elected as the new chairperson of the German Archaeological Association for a two-year term, succeeding Patrick Schollmeyer.

== Works ==
- Das Iseum Campense in Rom. Studie über den Isiskult unter Domitian (= Archäologie und Geschichte. Vol. 3). Verlag Archäologie und Geschichte, Heidelberg 1994, ISBN 3-9801863-2-6.
- Phönizische anthropoide Sarkophage (= Damaszener Forschungen. Vol. 10). von Zabern, Mainz 2001, ISBN 3-8053-2662-9.
- Die Skulpturen aus dem Quellheiligtum von Amrit. Studie zur Akkulturation in Phönizien (= Damaszener Forschungen. Vol. 12). von Zabern, Mainz 2004, ISBN 3-8053-3403-6.
- Ägyptens späte Blüte. Die Römer am Nil (= Zaberns Bildbände zur Archäologie. Special editions of Antike Welt). von Zabern, Mainz 2004, ISBN 3-8053-3276-9.
- Hannovers Nofretete. Die Bildnisse der Sent M´Ahesa von Bernhard Hoetger (= NahSichten. Vol. 2). Schnell & Steiner, Regensburg 2012, ISBN 978-3-7954-2627-9.
- Das Grab des Siamun in der Oase Siwa. Ammoniaca II (= Archäologische Veröffentlichungen des Deutschen Archäologischen Instituts Abteilung Kairo. Vol. 115). Harrassowitz, Wiesbaden 2014, ISBN 978-3-4471-0239-1.
- Ikonen der Kunst – und wie sie zu dem wurden, was sie heute sind. Prestel, Munich 2021, ISBN 978-3-7913-8680-5.
- as editor and author: Shark Island. The First German Concentration Camp. Nünnerich-Asmus, Oppenheim 2024, ISBN 978-3-96176-301-6 (German edition: Die Haifischinsel. Das erste deutsche Konzentrationslager. Nünnerich-Asmus, Oppenheim 2023, ISBN 978-3-96176-242-2).
- as editor and author (with contributions from students at the University of Göttingen): Eine Muse aus Italien. Graf Münster und seine Grand Tour (= NahSichten. Vol. 7). Schnell & Steiner, Regensburg 2025, ISBN 978-3-7954-9013-3.
