= Heinz Harant =

Australian student activist

Heinz Richard Harant (1919 – July 12, 1992) was an Australian student activist at the University of New South Wales, Australia, where he was one of the University's earliest alumni and most dedicated supporters. After graduating with a degree in engineering he devoted many years of service to student life on campus. He was instrumental in founding the University's Alumni Association and maintained a lifelong association with his alma mater through membership of various committees, and over 28 years of dedicated service to student life on campus.

== Contribution to the University of New South Wales ==
He moved with his family to Australia from Vienna, Austria, in September 1939 at the outbreak of World War 2. He graduated with a Bachelor of Electrical Engineering (Hons) in 1955, a member of the 4th class to graduate from the University of New South Wales.

He was active on the Student Council, organized a 1955 protest on student fee hikes and was a representative on the Student Affairs Committee. He was on the Union's Board of Management, the University Council, the Creation of the Provisional Committee for the Establishment of a Student' Guild and, consequently, as a founding member of the Student' Guild Council which he served on for many years advocating issues such as autonomy, freedom of speech and political action. He was also the co-founder and longtime honorary secretary of Ngunnagan Club and a founding member of the Aboriginal Scholarship movement known as ABSCHOL.

He helped to establish the University's Alumni Association and remained on the Alumni Board from its inception until his death. In 1991, he was awarded a special UNSW Alumni Award for service in recognition of this outstanding commitment.

=== Legacy ===
Several awards have been established to honor Heinz Harant including:

- Arc@UNSW Heinz Harant Award for student leadership and contribution to student life;
- Heinz Harant Prize for best new Australian music composition;
- University of New South Wales Heinz Harant Award for Teaching Innovation;
- University of New South Wales Heinz Harant Challenge Prize for general education;
- Heinz Harant Associate Conductor of the Sydney Symphony Orchestra award.

In 1994 two orchestral compositions by Ross Edwards titled Enyato III and Enyato IV were commissioned by Eva Griffith in memory of Heinz Harant.

== See also ==
- Arc @ UNSW Limited
