= Roope Hintz =

Finnish ice hockey player (born 1996)

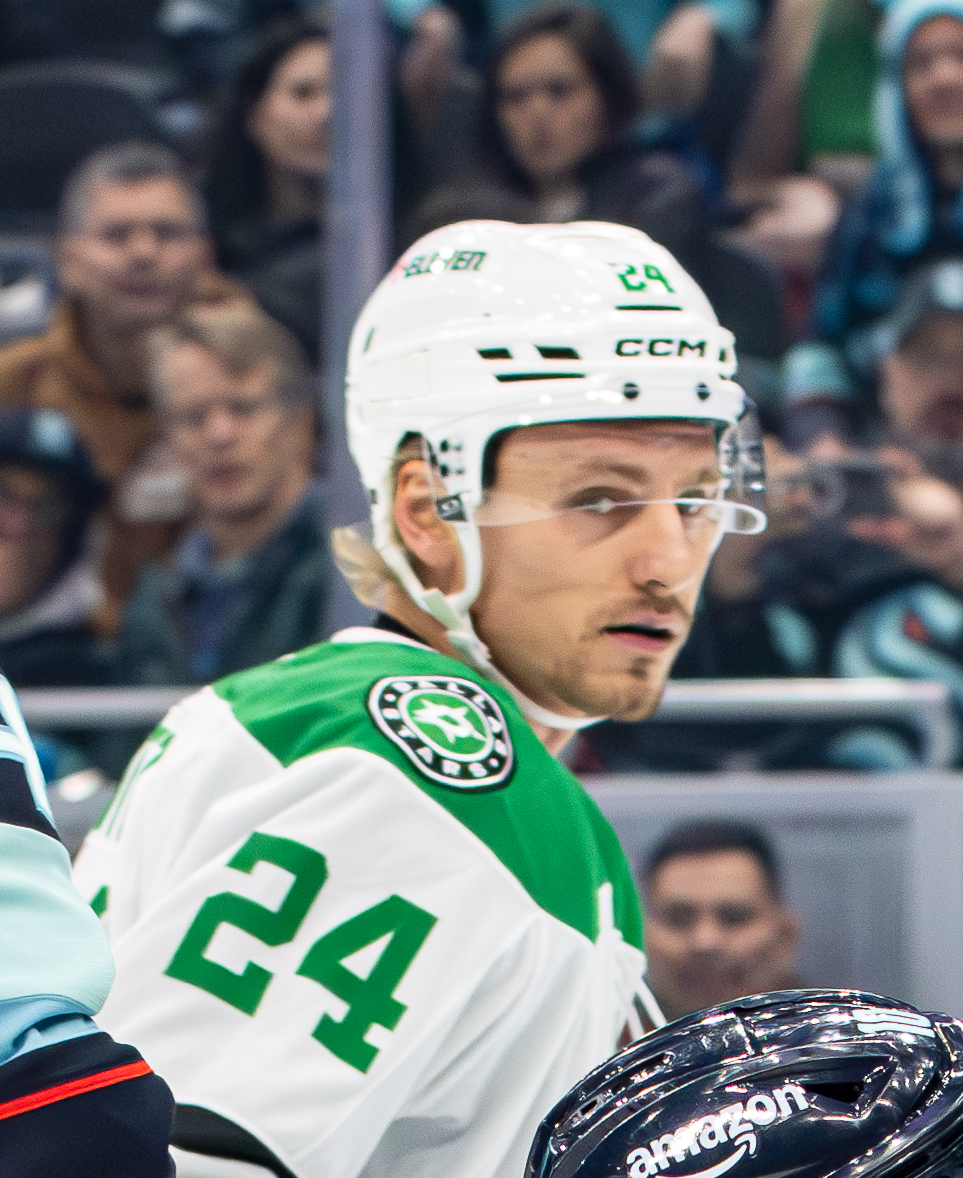
- Hintz with the Dallas Stars in 2025
- Born: 17 November 1996 (age 30) Nokia, Finland
- Height: 6 ft 3 in (191 cm)
- Weight: 217 lb (98 kg; 15 st 7 lb)
- Position: Forward
- Shoots: Left
- NHL team Former teams: Dallas Stars; Ilves; HIFK
- National team: Finland
- NHL draft: 49th overall, 2015; Dallas Stars
- Playing career: 2013–present

Roope Hintz (Finnish pronunciation: [ˈroːpe hints]; born 17 November 1996), nicknamed the "Ace of Spades", is a Finnish professional ice hockey player who is a forward and alternate captain for the Dallas Stars of the National Hockey League (NHL).

Growing up in Finland, Hintz played within the Ilves organization before spending the 2012–13 season playing for the Tampa Bay Juniors in the Empire Junior Hockey League. He also played an early portion of the season with the Bismarck Bobcats of the North American Hockey League before returning to play for Ilves professionally in Finland. Hintz played in seven Liiga games but spent the majority of the season with Finland's U20 team. As the youngest player on Ilves during the 2014–15 Liiga season, Hintz recorded five goals and 12 assists for 17 points through 42 games. Due to his Liiga play, Hintz was ranked by the NHL Central Scouting Bureau amongst the eligible European skaters before being selected 49th overall by the Dallas Stars in the 2015 NHL entry draft.

Hintz made the transition to the North American professional leagues during the 2017–18 NHL season. He played with the Stars' American Hockey League (AHL) affiliate, the Texas Stars, during the 2018 Calder Cup Finals against the Toronto Marlies. Hintz's play during the 2018–19 season earned him a full-time position at the NHL level during the 2019–20 season and during 2021–22 began playing consistently as the top line center, and the top player on the team.

== Early life ==
Hintz was born on 17 November 1996, in Nokia, Finland to parents Marika and Kai. He began his playing career with the Nokia Pyry at Pyry Skating School at the age of three. He was also a multi-sport athlete growing up, playing organized basketball, soccer and hockey. While both of his parents played basketball growing up, Hintz chose to follow his brother Miiko and play ice hockey.

== Playing career ==
=== Ilves ===
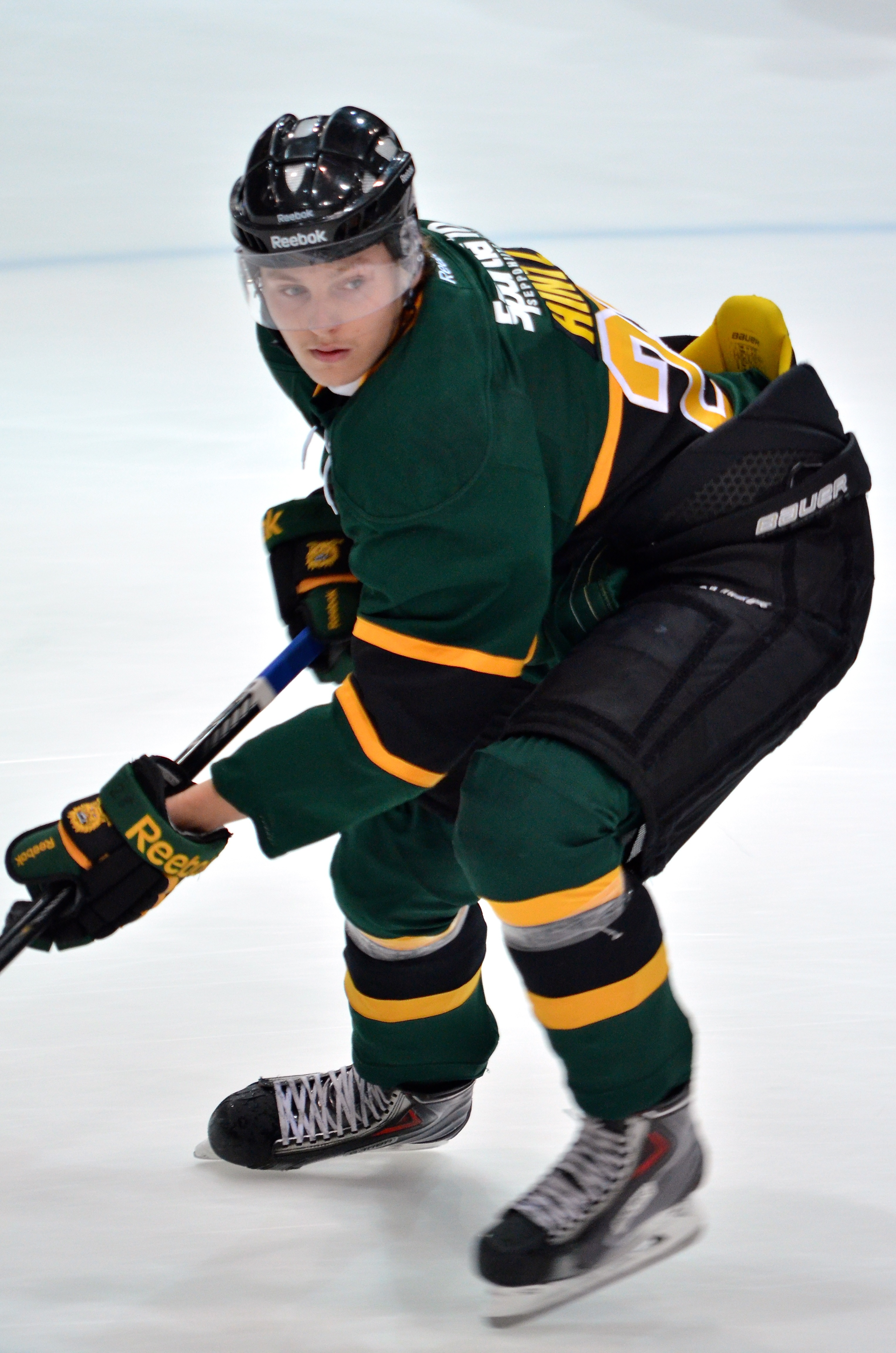
Hintz with Ilves in 2013.

Growing up in Finland, Hintz played within the Ilves organization before being encouraged to spend the 2012–13 season playing for the Tampa Bay Juniors in the Empire Junior Hockey League. He also played an early portion of the season with the Bismarck Bobcats of the North American Hockey League before deciding to turn professional and play for Ilves in Finland. During his 20 games with the Juniors, Hintz tallied 20 goals and 15 assists for 35 points as he got acclimated to the smaller ice surfaces in North America. Upon returning to Finland, Hintz made his Liiga debut playing with Ilves during the 2013–14 Liiga season. He played in seven Liiga games but spent the majority of the season with their U20 team. In November 2013, Hintz was chosen as the Finnish Youth Championship League's October Player of the Month.

During the 2014–15 Liiga season, which Hintz played with Ilves, he recorded five goals and 12 assists for 17 points through 42 games. As the youngest player on the team, he finished eighth in points and seventh in assists.

=== HIFK ===
On 23 April 2015, after two seasons with Ilves, Hintz transferred to fellow Liiga club HIFK on a two-year contract. Hintz was ranked by the NHL Central Scouting Bureau amongst the eligible European skaters before he was selected 49th overall by the Dallas Stars in the 2015 NHL entry draft.

Hintz returned to the Liiga following the draft but suffered an injury and missed the start of the 2015–16 season. After missing the first 11 games of the season, Hintz returned to HIFK as their second-line center. Within the following 10 games, Hintz registered two goals and three assists while also averaging 18:09 of ice time per game. He also competed in the 2016 Channel One Cup with Finland's top national team and he recorded one goal and one assist in three games. Despite missing the first eleven games of the season, Hintz finished the season with 19 goals and 11 assists for 30 points through 44 games. Hintz continued his scoring prowess into the postseason and led the Liiga in scoring with three goals and 11 assists for 14 points through 14 games prior to HIFK being eliminated.

=== Dallas Stars ===
Following the conclusion of the 2016–17 Liiga season, Hintz signed a three-year, entry-level contract with the Dallas Stars. He attended the Stars' training camp prior to the 2017–18 season but was assigned to their American Hockey League (AHL) affiliate, the Texas Stars. He made his AHL debut in the Stars' season opener on 5 October and scored in their 6–5 win over the Chicago Wolves. By December 2017, Hintz had recorded nine goals and eight assists through 31 games to lead team rookies in scoring. He continued to produce offensively as the second half of the season began and by March was tied for fifth on the team with 27 points. As a result of his play, Hintz was recalled to the NHL level on 5 March 2018. He rejoined the AHL team the following day without making his NHL debut. Upon rejoining the Stars' lineup, Hintz helped them make a 2018 Calder Cup playoffs push by scoring five goals in his last 10 games to tie for 11th among AHL rookies in goal scoring. During his first Calder Cup playoffs, Hintz played an important role in the Stars' push to the 2018 Calder Cup Finals against the Toronto Marlies. In the first round against the Ontario Reign, Hintz assisted on two important goals; Brian Flynn's game-winner in overtime and Denis Gurianov's game-winner in game 4 that clinched the series. He then recorded three goals and three assists in the Conference Finals against the Rockford IceHogs, including the overtime game 6 winner. His goal came with 8.5 seconds left in overtime to give the Stars a 2–1 win over the IceHogs. The Stars eventually lost to the Marlies in game 7 of the Finals.

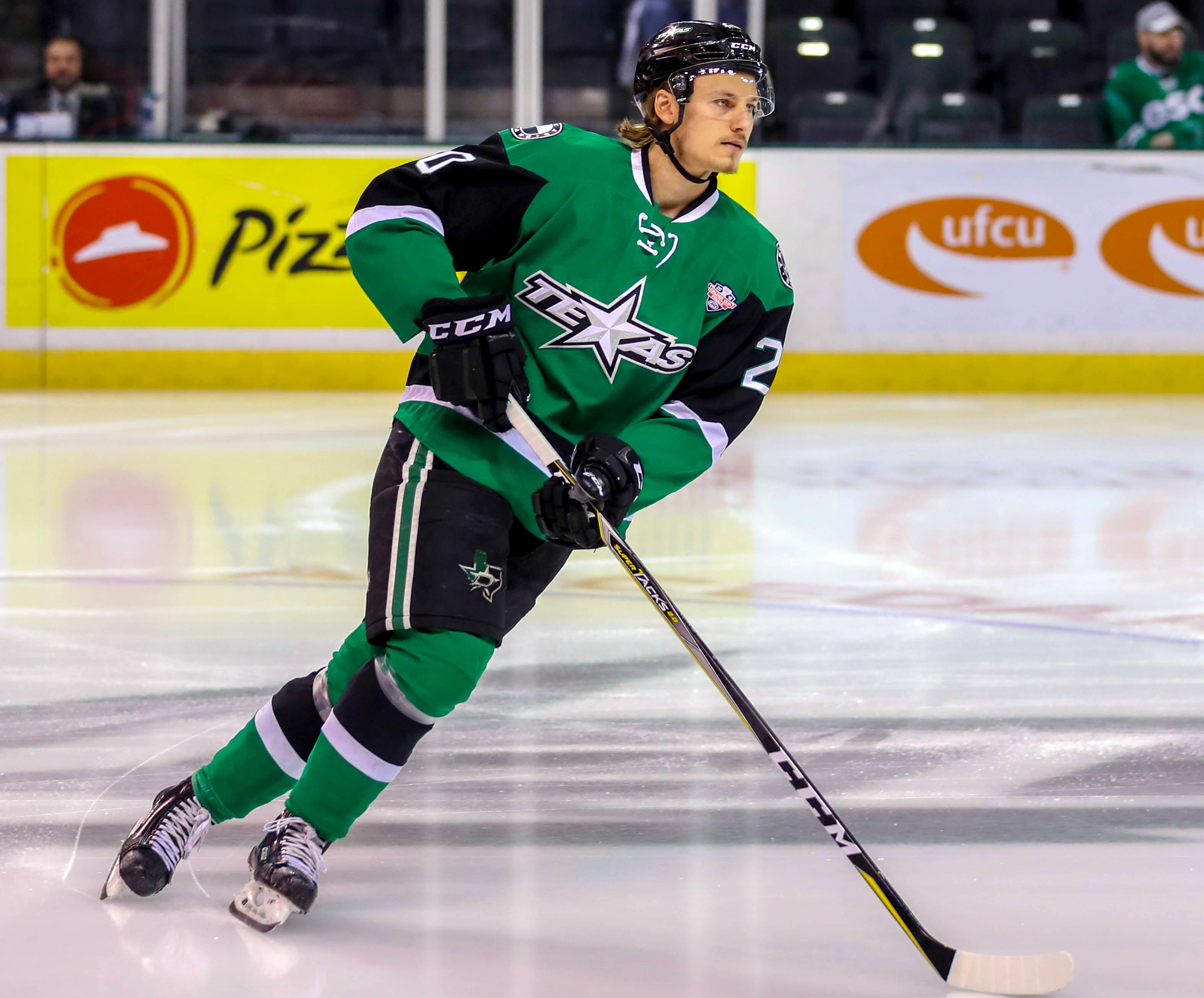
Hintz with the Texas Stars during the 2018 Calder Cup Finals.

Following their Calder Cup loss, Hintz participated for the Stars in the 2018 NHL Prospect Tournament in Traverse City, Michigan. During the tournament, he centered the Stars' top line with various linemates including Nick Caamano and Jason Robertson. He continued to impress the Stars' coaching staff during their preseason games and spent time centering the top line with Jamie Benn and Alexander Radulov. As a result of his impressive training camp and preseason efforts, Hintz was named to the Dallas Stars roster to start the 2018–19 NHL season. He subsequently made his NHL debut on 4 October 2018, playing 9:59 and recording one shot on goal and four hits in a 3–0 win over the Arizona Coyotes. However, after playing in five games for Dallas and recording seven shots, Hintz was reassigned to their AHL affiliate on 20 October. When speaking of the demotion, coach Jim Montgomery stated it was to get him going after he struggled in his five games. Upon returning to the AHL, Hintz earned a spot on their top line alongside Denis Gurianov and Michael Mersch as he recorded four points through his first three games. He remained in the AHL for nine games and produced 11 points before being recalled to the NHL level on 18 November 2018. That same night, Hintz played in his sixth NHL game and scored his first NHL goal at the Barclays Center in a 6–2 victory over the New York Islanders. During his time at the NHL level, Hintz recorded three points before being reassigned to the Texas Stars on 6 December.

As the second half of the season continued, Hintz was sent down to the AHL three times and recalled three times. However, after being reassigned shortly during the NHL All-Star Game break and Dallas' bye week, he eventually became a mainstay on the Dallas Stars lineup. By February, Hintz began to earn top-six minutes while playing on the left wing with Tyler Seguin and Alexander Radulov. Following an injury to Jamie Benn, Hintz earned a spot on the Stars' top line with Seguin and Radulov, where he scored the overtime game-winner to re-secure the Stars' wildcard spot for the 2019 Stanley Cup playoffs. Hintz finished the regular season with four goals and seven assists for 11 points through his final 14 regular season games. As the Stars began their 2019 Stanley Cup push, Hintz helped the Stars beat the Nashville Predators in the Eastern Conference First Round to face the eventual winners, the St. Louis Blues, in the Western Conference Second Round. Despite having a weak start in his first NHL playoff series, Hintz worked with assistant coach Stu Barnes following game 2 and went 15-for-29 in faceoffs during his games 3 and 4. Beyond improving in faceoffs, Hintz also scored his first and second career playoff goals on 17 April 2019 to even up the series against the Predators. After eliminating the Predators, Hintz and the Stars faced the St. Louis Blues. After injuring his foot in game 6, Hintz returned to the ice the following game with a fractured foot. He played through the injury and recorded two shots on goal and three blocked shots through 45 shifts. Prior to being eliminated by the Blues, Hintz and Radulov co-led the team in goal scoring with five goals each.

Hintz's play during the 2018–19 season earned him a full time position at the NHL level during the 2019–20 season. Throughout the month of October, he centered the top line with Jamie Benn and Corey Perry while leading the team in points and goals. While maintaining this pace, he also ranked 10th on the team in average time on ice at 16:28. His strong start to the season was cut short in November after he suffered a lower body injury during a game against the Montreal Canadiens. At the time of the injury, he led the Stars with nine goals and 11 points. Hintz was eventually placed on injured reserve retroactive to 2 November. In his return to the lineup on 23 November, Hintz scored which extended the team's point streak to 11. Hintz continued to produce following his injury and continued to rank first on the team in goals with 15 by late January. His suffered another upper body injury during a game against the Tampa Bay Lightning on 27 January 2020. Hintz returned to the top line with Benn and Seguin after missing two games. While skating on the top line, Hintz scored the game-tying goal and overtime game-winning goal in a February contest against the St. Louis Blues. He subsequently became the first Stars player since Mike Ribeiro to achieve such a feat. When the NHL paused play due to the COVID-19 pandemic, Hintz was tied with Benn for second on the team with 19 goals despite ranking eighth among its forwards in average ice time per game.

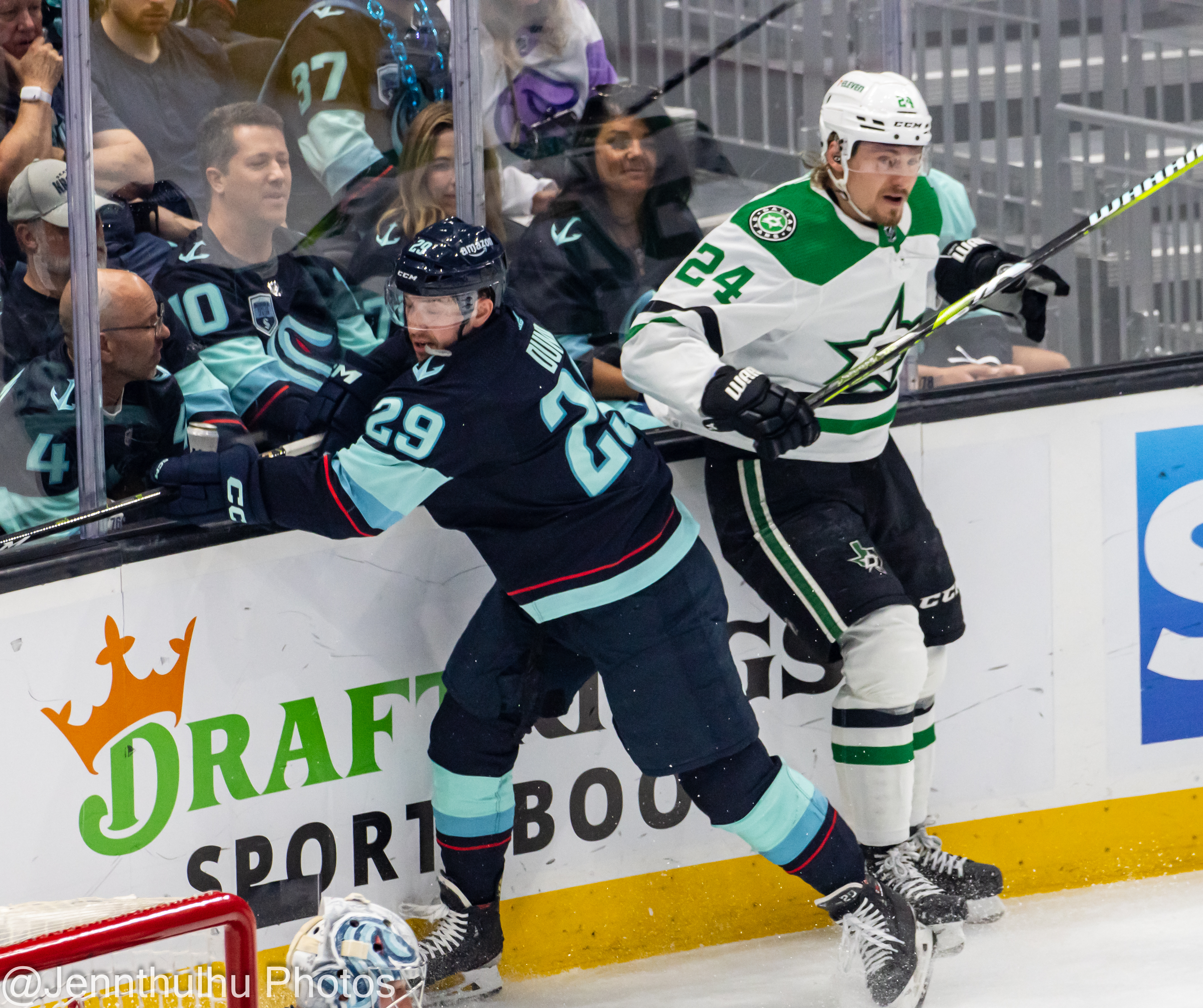
Hintz brushes off a check from Vince Dunn of the Seattle Kraken during a game of the 2023 Stanley Cup playoffs.

When the NHL resumed playing in August, Hintz and the Stars defeated the Calgary Flames, Colorado Avalanche, and Vegas Golden Knights to qualify for the Stanley Cup Finals. During their series against the Flames, Hintz played significantly more minutes than he did during the regular season. While he averaged 14:45 during the regular season, Hintz played 17 minutes in game 4. The Stars eventually defeated the Flames in the six games to face off against the Colorado Avalanche in the Western Conference Second Round. During game 1 of their series against the Avalanche, Hintz tallied his first postseason goal of the tournament to lead the Stars to a 5–3 victory. He eventually helped the Stars defeat the Avalanche in seven games to face the Vegas Golden Knights in the Western Conference Final. During their series, Hintz suffered an injury in game 4 and was considered a game-time decision for game 5. After eliminating the Knights, Hintz suffered another injury in the Stanley Cup Finals against the Lightning.

Following the Stars' elimination from the playoffs, Jim Nill signed Hintz to a three-year contract extension worth $9,450,000 with an average annual value of $3,150,000. During the off-season, Hintz took four weeks off to rest and recover in Finland but underwent an MRI upon his return to Dallas that revealed surgery was required. Despite the injury, Hintz was one of 13 forwards named to the Stars' 2020–21 opening night roster. He put up career highs in goals, assists, and points through the shortened season despite enduring an injury for most of the campaign.

During the 2021–22 NHL season, Hintz has played on the Stars' top line, alongside Joe Pavelski and Jason Robertson, who contributed heavily to the goal-scoring of the Stars for the season with the line combining for almost 44% of the Stars’ goals. On 30 November, Hintz recorded his first career NHL hat-trick to beat the Carolina Hurricanes 4–1. He reached the 30-goal mark after his first 65 games of the regular season.

Hintz began the 2022–23 season again on the Stars' top line, playing at or above a point-per-game pace for the first 20 games of his season. On 29 November 2022, Hintz signed an eight-year, $67.6 million contract extension to remain with the Stars. On 19 April 2023, Hintz recorded his first career postseason hat-trick in game 2 of the Stars' 7–3 win against the Minnesota Wild in the first round series He became only the fourth Stars player ever to score a hat-trick in the playoffs and the first to do it in Dallas.

== International play ==
Medal record

Representing Finland

Ice hockey

Olympic Games
| Bronze medal – third place | 2026 Milano Cortina | |

World Junior Championships
| Gold medal – first place | 2016 Finland | |

He represented Finland at the 2026 Winter Olympics and won a bronze medal.

== Career statistics ==
=== Regular season and playoffs ===
| | | | Regular season | | | | | Playoffs |
| Season | Team | League | GP | G | A | Pts | PIM | GP | G | A | Pts | PIM |
|---|---|---|---|---|---|---|---|---|---|---|---|---|
| 2012–13 | Tampa Bay Juniors | EmJHL | 20 | 20 | 15 | 35 | 0 | — | — | — | — | — |
| 2012–13 | Bismarck Bobcats | NAHL | 2 | 0 | 0 | 0 | 0 | — | — | — | — | — |
| 2013–14 | Ilves | FIN U18 | 1 | 2 | 0 | 2 | 0 | 7 | 3 | 6 | 9 | 4 |
| 2013–14 | Ilves | FIN U20 | 29 | 18 | 20 | 38 | 16 | 5 | 0 | 0 | 0 | 0 |
| 2013–14 | Ilves | Liiga | 7 | 0 | 0 | 0 | 2 | — | — | — | — | — |
| 2014–15 | Ilves | Liiga | 42 | 5 | 12 | 17 | 10 | 2 | 0 | 0 | 0 | 0 |
| 2014–15 | Ilves | FIN U20 | — | — | — | — | — | 6 | 1 | 1 | 2 | 0 |
| 2015–16 | HIFK | Liiga | 33 | 8 | 12 | 20 | 4 | 18 | 2 | 4 | 6 | 2 |
| 2016–17 | HIFK | Liiga | 44 | 19 | 11 | 30 | 18 | 14 | 3 | 11 | 14 | 4 |
| 2017–18 | Texas Stars | AHL | 70 | 20 | 15 | 35 | 27 | 22 | 4 | 8 | 12 | 4 |
| 2018–19 | Dallas Stars | NHL | 58 | 9 | 13 | 22 | 24 | 13 | 5 | 3 | 8 | 2 |
| 2018–19 | Texas Stars | AHL | 21 | 9 | 13 | 22 | 10 | — | — | — | — | — |
| 2019–20 | Dallas Stars | NHL | 60 | 19 | 14 | 33 | 16 | 25 | 2 | 11 | 13 | 10 |
| 2020–21 | Dallas Stars | NHL | 41 | 15 | 28 | 43 | 4 | — | — | — | — | — |
| 2021–22 | Dallas Stars | NHL | 80 | 37 | 35 | 72 | 28 | 6 | 2 | 2 | 4 | 2 |
| 2022–23 | Dallas Stars | NHL | 73 | 37 | 38 | 75 | 30 | 19 | 10 | 14 | 24 | 8 |
| 2023–24 | Dallas Stars | NHL | 80 | 30 | 35 | 65 | 22 | 15 | 2 | 6 | 8 | 6 |
| 2024–25 | Dallas Stars | NHL | 76 | 28 | 39 | 67 | 30 | 17 | 6 | 6 | 12 | 10 |
| 2025–26 | Dallas Stars | NHL | 53 | 15 | 29 | 44 | 18 | — | — | — | — | — |
| Liiga totals | | | 126 | 32 | 35 | 67 | 34 | 34 | 5 | 15 | 20 | 6 |
| NHL totals | | | 521 | 190 | 231 | 421 | 172 | 95 | 27 | 42 | 69 | 38 |

=== International ===
| Year | Team | Event | Result | GP | G | A | Pts | PIM |
|---|---|---|---|---|---|---|---|---|
| 2015 | Finland | WJC | 7th | 5 | 0 | 2 | 2 | 2 |
| 2016 | Finland | WJC | 1st place, gold medalist(s) | 7 | 3 | 1 | 4 | 2 |
| 2025 | Finland | 4NF | 4th | 3 | 0 | 0 | 0 | 0 |
| 2026 | Finland | OG | 3rd place, bronze medalist(s) | 6 | 1 | 3 | 4 | 2 |
| Junior totals | | | | 12 | 3 | 3 | 6 | 4 |
| Senior totals | | | | 9 | 1 | 3 | 4 | 2 |
