= Joy Alice Hintz =

American writer (1926–2009)

Joy Alice Hintz (February 7, 1926 – April 2009) was an American writer and a community advocate for migrant workers in Ohio and a peace advocate in Central America. Hinz was inducted into the Ohio Women's Hall of Fame in 1993.

== Early life, education, and career ==
Joy Alice Posey was born in Zanesville, Ohio, on February 7, 1926, and grew up in Columbus. She earned a Bachelor of Arts and a Bachelor of Science degrees from Ohio State University. She married Howard Hintz in 1952. They relocated to Tiffin, Ohio when he took a faculty position at Heidelberg College. During her first years in Tiffin, she taught school in Tiffin and Attica, Ohio. In 1956, Hintz took the position as curator of the Charles H. Jones Collection of Minerals at Heidelberg College and she remained in the job for 25 years.

== Advocacy for migrant farmworkers ==
Hintz was appointed to a migrant workers committee by Ohio Governor John J. Gilligan. She was president of the Committee on Migrant Relations of Tiffin, and a founder of Auxilio y Amistad (Aid and Friendship.)

== Writer ==
Hintz studied the migrants farmworkers and wrote several books and articles about their working conditions. She collected and compiled anthologies of workers' poems, essays, and drawings.

== Death and legacy ==
Hintz was inducted into the Ohio Women's Hall of Fame in 1993, and the Ohio Farmworker Advocate Hall of Fame. She received the NAACP Peacemaker Award. She died from complications of Alzheimer's disease in 2009.
