= Wolfsberg, Carinthia =

Wolfsberg
- Municipality
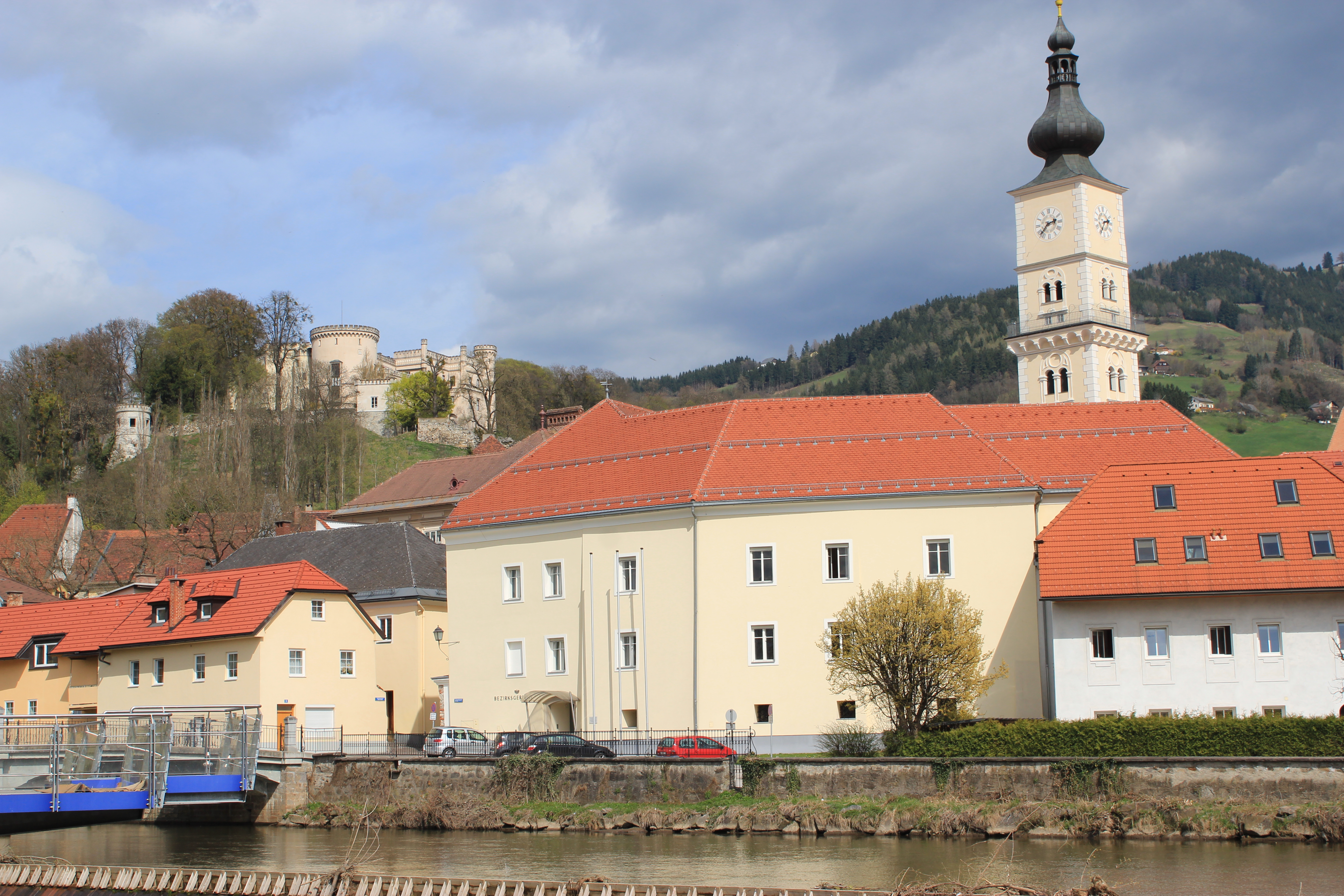
- Riverside and Wolfsberg Castle

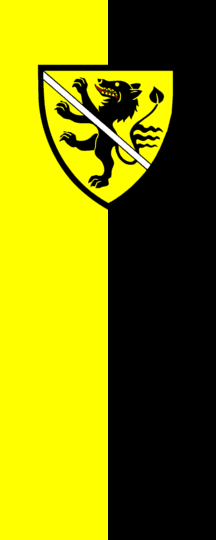
- Flag Coat of arms

- Location within Austria
- Coordinates: 46°51′N 14°50′E
- Country: Austria
- State: Carinthia
- District: Wolfsberg

Government
  - Mayor: Hannes Primus (SPÖ)

Area
  - Total: 278.31 km^{2} (107.46 sq mi)
- Elevation: 463 m (1,519 ft)

Population (2018-01-01)
  - Total: 25,035
  - Density: 89.954/km^{2} (232.98/sq mi)
- Time zone: UTC+1 (CET)
  - Summer (DST): UTC+2 (CEST)
- Postal code: 9400
- Area code: 04352
- Website: www.wolfsberg.at

Wolfsberg (Austrian German pronunciation: [ˈvɔlfsbɛrɡ]; Slovene: Volšperk) is a town in Carinthia, Austria, the capital of Wolfsberg District.

== Geography ==
The town is situated within the Lavanttal Alps, west of the Koralpe range in the valley of the Lavant River, a left tributary of the Drava. In the northeast, the road up to the Packsattel mountain pass connects Wolfsberg with Voitsberg in Styria. Wolfsberg's municipal area of 279 km^{2} (108 mi^{2}) is the fourth largest in Austria.

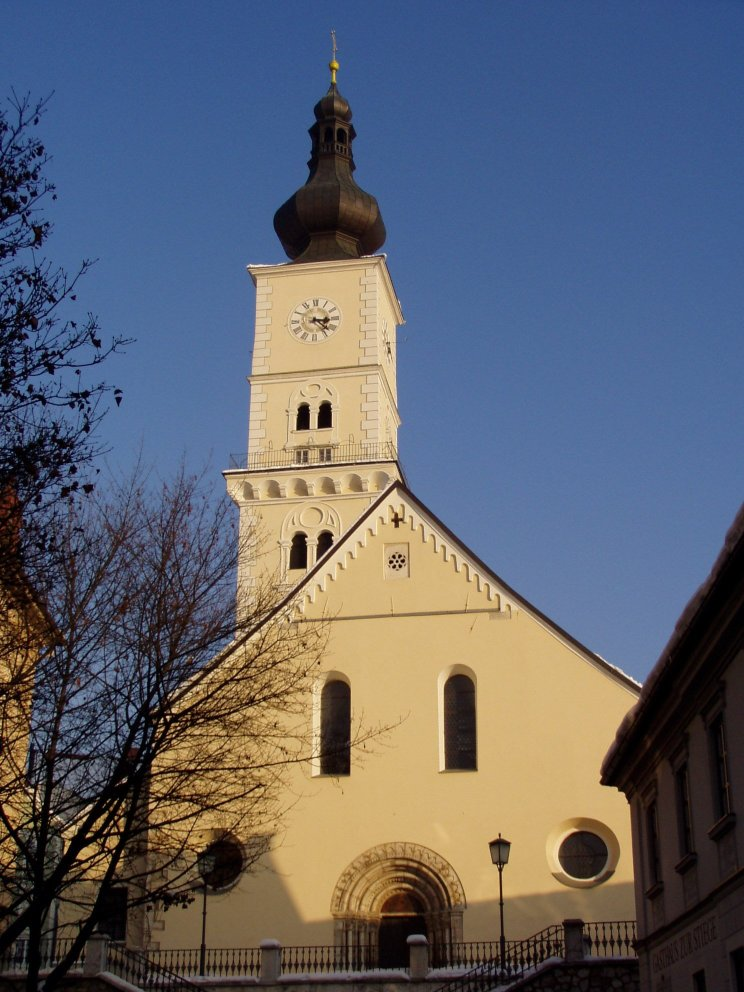
St. Mark's Church

The municipality comprises 40 cadastral communities (Surface area in hectares 31. Dezember 2019):

- Aichberg (1.897,01 ha)
- Auen (600,55 ha)
- Forst (2.458,67 ha)
- Gräbern-Prebl (1.495,09 ha)
- Gries (93,78 ha)
- Hartelsberg (1.188,11 ha)
- Hattendorf (243,20 ha)
- Hintertheißenegg (1.444,63 ha)
- Kleinedling (435,20 ha)
- Kleinwinklern (48,62 ha)
- Lading (2.335,45 ha)
- Leiwald (1.428,66 ha)
- Michaelsdorf (348,40 ha)
- Oberleidenberg (1.162,33 ha)
- Paildorf (138,81 ha)
- Pfaffendorf (101,08 ha)
- Preims (1.939,64 ha)
- Priel (296,13 ha)
- Reding (149,89 ha)
- Reideben (114,35 ha)
- Reisberg (1.245,59 ha)
- Rieding (1.210,13 ha)
- Ritzing (92,89 ha)
- St. Jakob (107,35 ha)
- St. Johann (112,12 ha)
- St. Marein (110,33 ha)
- St. Margarethen (237,03 ha)
- St. Michael (470,82 ha)
- St. Stefan (732,21 ha)
- Schoßbach (14,49 ha)
- Schwemmtratten (45,88 ha)
- Thürn (516,80 ha)
- Unterleidenberg (334,56 ha)
- Vordergumitsch (545,23 ha)
- Vordertheißenegg (778,12 ha)
- Waldenstein (1.019,73 ha)
- Weißenbach (125,86 ha)
- Witra (2.185,37 ha)
- Wolfsberg Obere Stadt (15,49 ha)
- Wolfsberg Untere Stadt (11,20 ha)

The municipal area is divided into 65 villages (population in brackets as of 1 January 2020):

- Aichberg (255)
- Altendorf (415)
- Arling (51)
- Auen (810)
- Eselsdorf (27)
- Forst (292)
- Glein (62)
- Gräbern (121)
- Gries (1221)
- Großedling (243)
- Hartelsberg (166)
- Hartneidstein (31)
- Hattendorf (447)
- Hintertheißenegg (38)
- Kleinedling (1838)
- Kleinwinklern (86)
- Klippitztörl (43)
- Kötsch (12)
- Kragelsdorf (72)
- Lading (236)
- Lading Sonnseite (236)
- Lausing (55)
- Leiwald (12)
- Magersdorf (54)
- Maildorf (115)
- Michaelsdorf (223)
- Oberleidenberg (376)
- Paildorf (223)
- Pfaffendorf (121)
- Pollheim (381)
- Prebl (305)
- Preims (97)
- Priel (3032)
- Raggl (146)
- Reding (2852)
- Reideben (68)
- Reinfelsdorf (75)
- Reisberg (127)
- Rieding (276)
- Riegelsdorf (54)
- Ritzing (574)
- Schilting (64)
- Schleife (549)
- Schoßbach (189)
- Schwemmtratten (426)
- Siegelsdorf (227)
- St. Jakob (865)
- St. Johann (1056)
- St. Marein (363)
- St. Margarethen im Lavanttal (886)
- St. Michael (538)
- St. Stefan (1723)
- St. Thomas (203)
- Thürn (198)
- Unterleidenberg (217)
- Völking (175)
- Vordergumitsch (164)
- Vordertheißenegg (216)
- Waldenstein (126)
- Weißenbach Gumitsch (71)
- Weißenbach Rieding (35)
- Witra (121)
- Wois (8)
- Wolfsberg (718)
- Wolkersdorf (134)
- Wölling (121)

== History ==
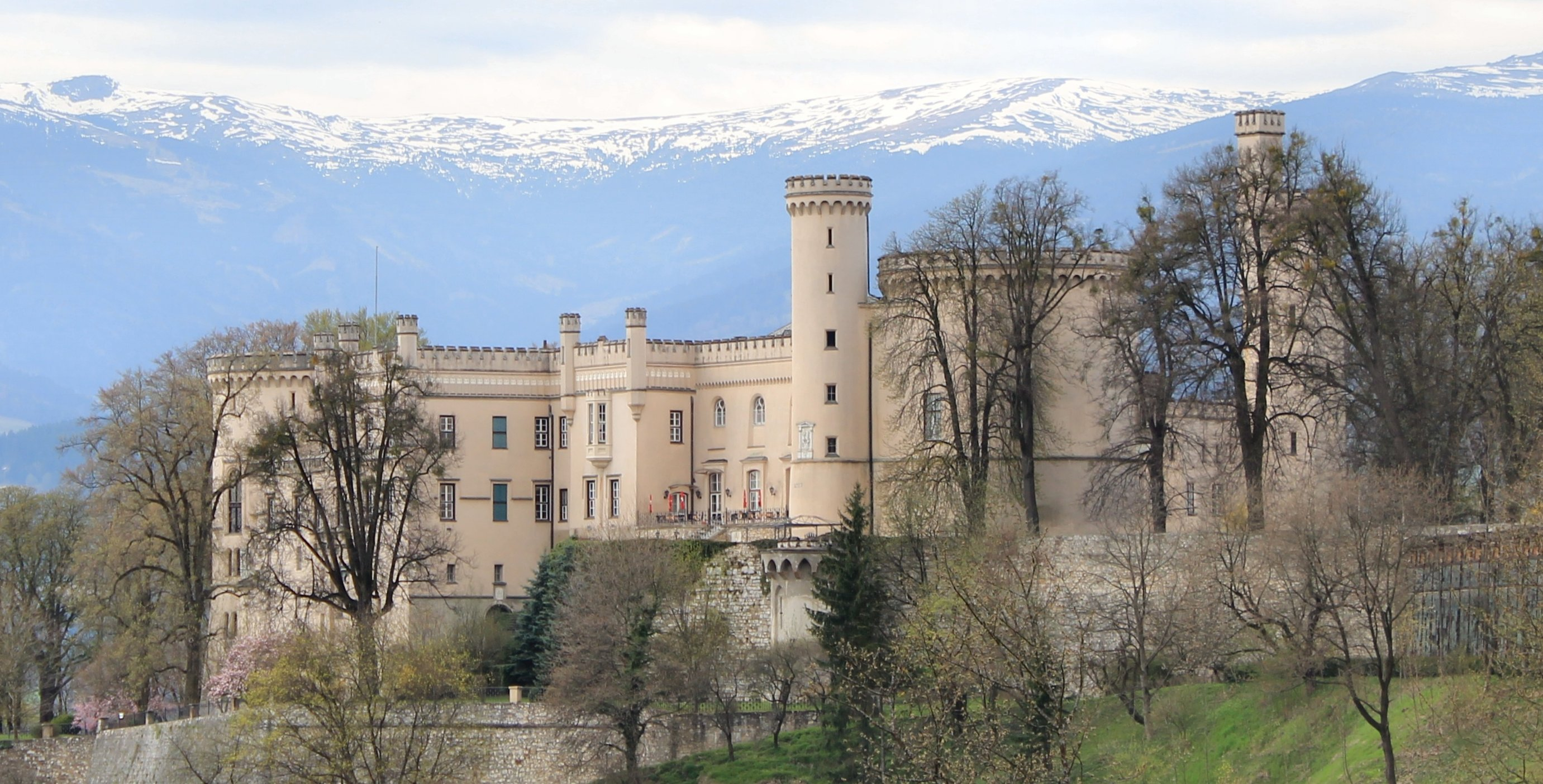
Wolfsberg Castle

The area of Wolfsberg belonged to the estates within the medieval Duchy of Carinthia that were ceded to the Prince-Bishopric of Bamberg, probably already by Emperor Henry II in 1007. The castle above the town was first mentioned as Wolfsperch in an 1178 deed of St. Paul's Abbey in the Lavanttal. The adjacent settlement became the administrative centre of Bamberg's Carinthian territories and in 1331 received town privileges by Prince-Bishop Werntho Schenk von Reicheneck.

During the Protestant Reformation the Bayerhofen Castle residence, first mentioned in 1239 and rebuilt in the 16th century, became a center of Lutheranism, which nevertheless was suppressed by the Counter-Reformation. In 1759 the Habsburg empress Maria Theresa acquired all Bamberg lands in Carinthia. Wolfsberg Castle was purchased by Count Hugo Henckel von Donnersmarck in 1846 and rebuilt in a Tudorbethan style.

In World War II the village of Priel south of the town center was the site of the Stalag XVIII-A prisoner-of-war camp with about 7,000 inmates. After the war it served as a detention camp run by the British occupation forces.

Largest groups of foreign residents
| Nationality | Population (2025) |
|---|---|
| Germany | 279 |
| Bosnia and Herzegovina | 255 |
| Croatia | 243 |
| Romania | 230 |
| Turkey | 190 |
| Syria | 139 |
| Slovenia | 137 |
| Hungary | 125 |
| Ukraine | 50 |
| Poland | 48 |
| Italy | 23 |
| Slovakia | 20 |
| Serbia | 19 |
| Iraq | 18 |
| Czech Republic | 11 |
| Bulgaria | 6 |

== Politics ==
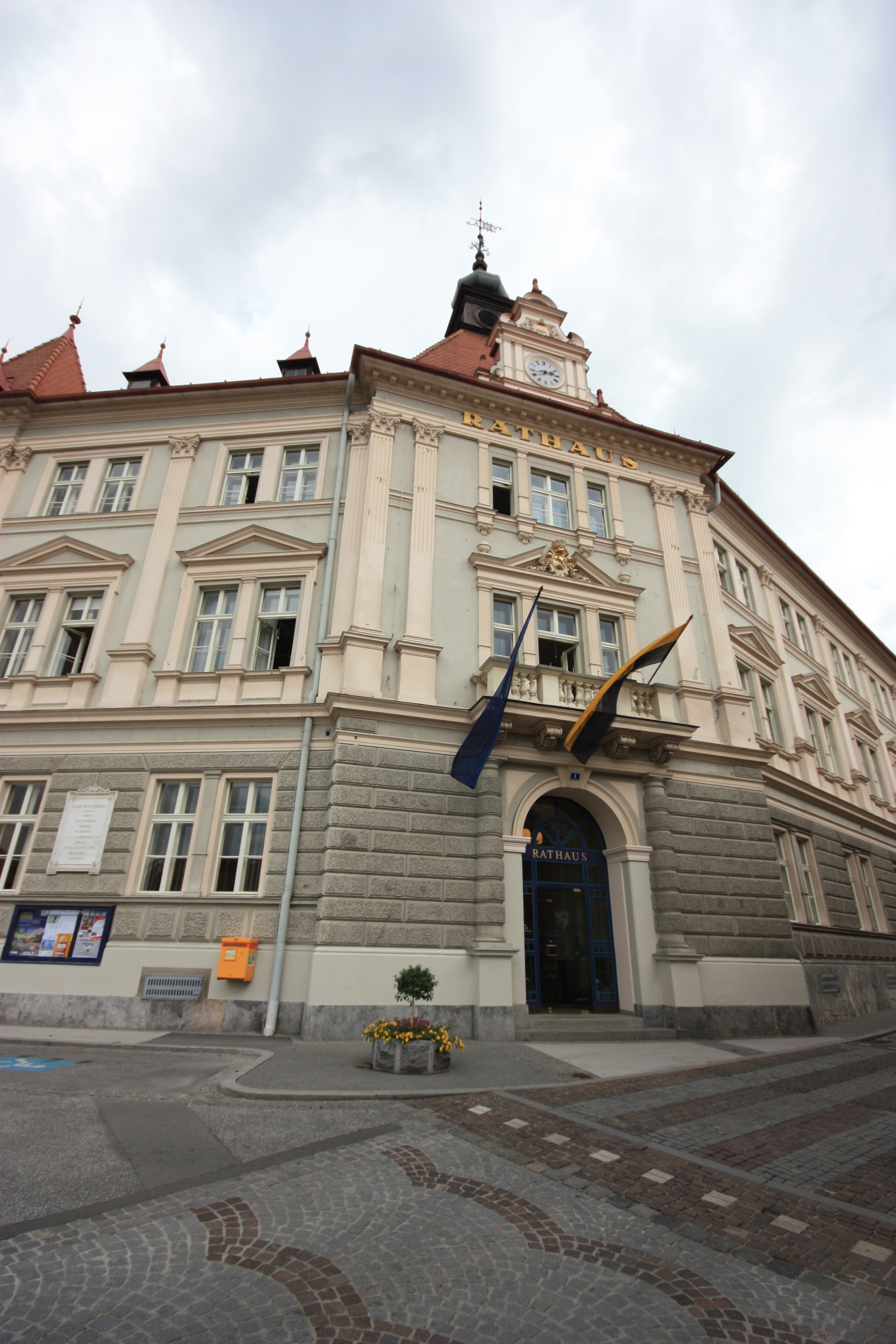
Town hall

The municipal council (Gemeinderat) consists of 35 members. Following the 2021 Carinthian Local Elections, the seat distribution is as follows:

- Social Democratic Party of Austria (SPÖ): 22 seats
- Austrian People's Party (ÖVP): 6 seats
- Freedom Party of Austria (FPÖ): 5 seats
- The Greens - The Green Alternative (GRÜNE): 2 seats

== Twin towns ==
Wolfsberg is twinned with:

- Herzogenaurach, Germany
- Várpalota, Hungary

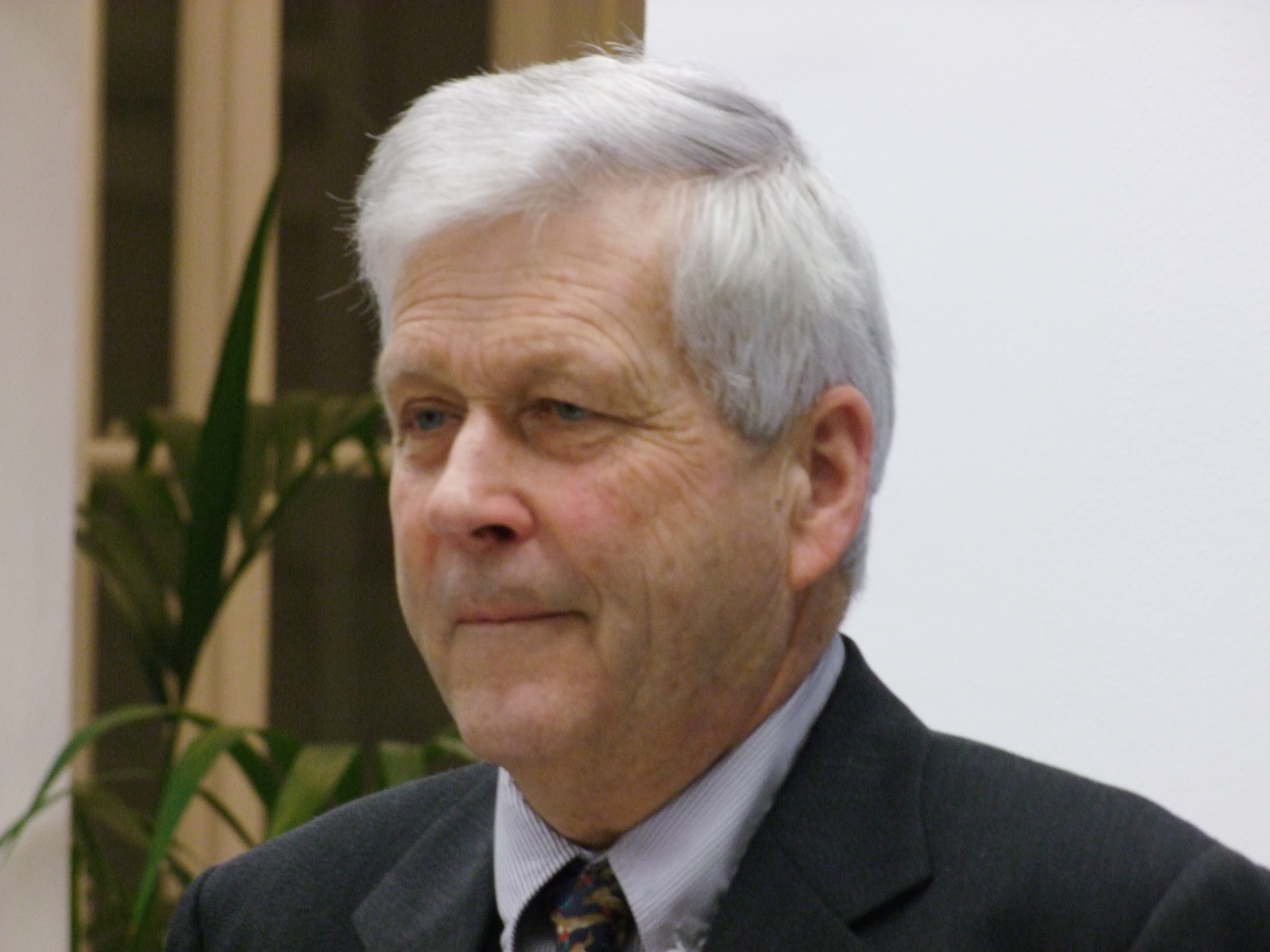
Ulrich Habsburg-Lothringen, 2010

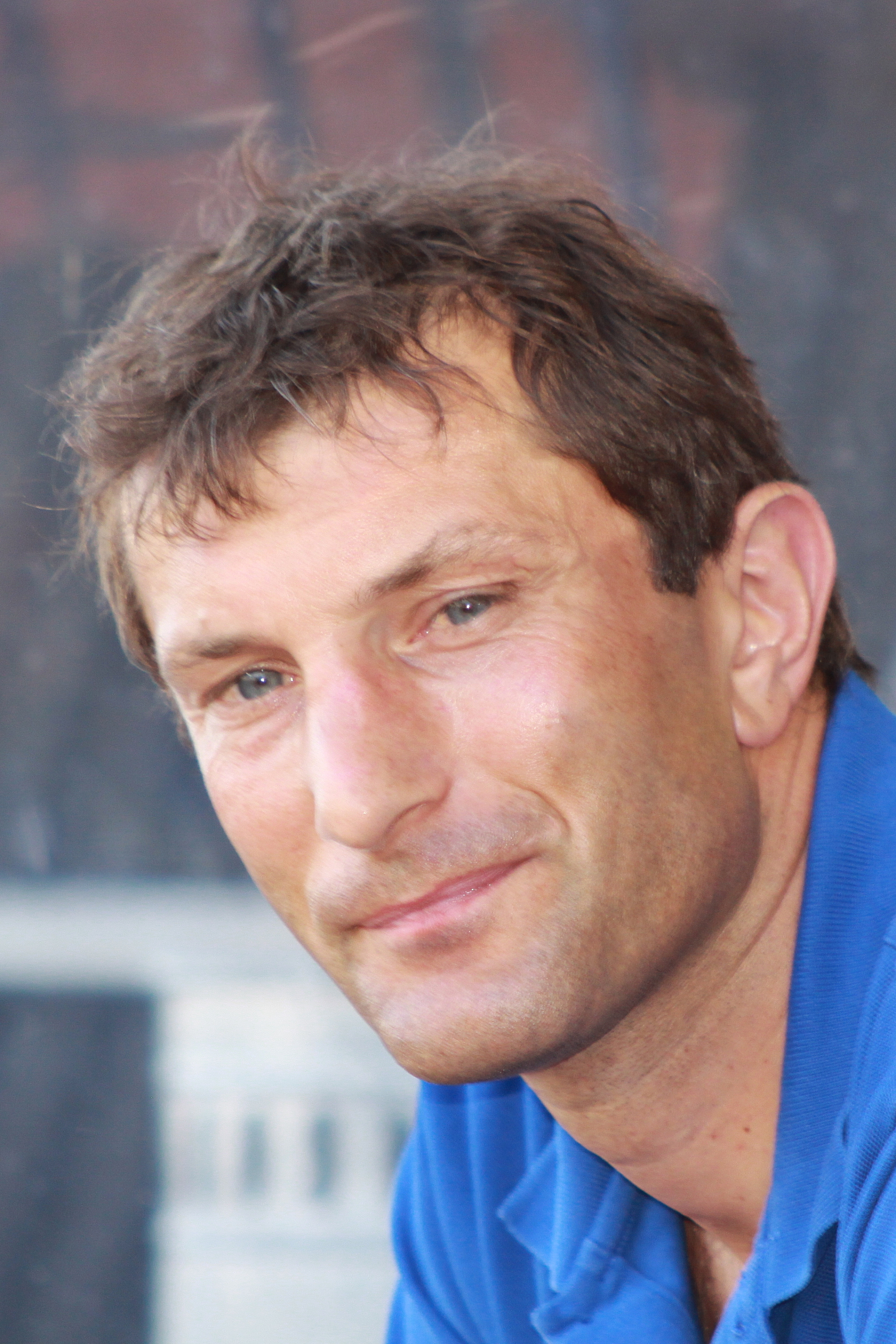
Walter Kogler, 2009

== Notable people ==
- Michael Tangl (1864–1921), scholar of history and historical documents (diplomatics).
- Christine Lavant (1915 in Großedling – 1973), poet and novelist
- Hermann Schmid, (DE Wiki) (born 1939), actor and director
- Ulrich Habsburg-Lothringen (born 1941), nobleman and politician, formerly The Greens
- Erwin Friedrich Wagner (born 1950), biochemist in cancer and molecular biology
- Dietmar W. Winkler (born 1963), scholar of patristics and ecclesiastical history.
- Elisabeth Köstinger (born 1978), politician (ÖVP)

=== Sport ===
- Hubert Baumgartner (born 1955), former football player and manager, played 408 games.
- Walter Kogler (born 1967), football player and coach; played over 430 games and 28 for Austria
- Heinz Arzberger (born 1972), football goalkeeper, played 200 games
- Patrick Friesacher (born 1980), racing driver
- Kai Schoppitsch (born 1980), football player, played over 200 games
- Christian Prawda (born 1982), football player, played over 350 games
- Marlies Hanschitz (born 1986), retired footballer who played 45 games for Austria women
- Eva Wutti (born 1989), triathlete and cyclist
