= Heinz Lembke =

Personal details
- Born: 24 March 1937 Stralsund, Nazi Germany
- Died: 1 November 1981 (aged 44) Lüneburg, Lower Saxony, West Germany

Heinz Lembke (24 March 1937 – 1 November 1981) was a German right-wing extremist and a member of the stay-behind network Gladio. Lembke was found hanged in his prison cell one day before his hearing by the federal prosecutor.

In 1959, at the age of 22, Lembke fled from East to West Germany and immediately connected with right-wing extremist organisations. He became a member of the Bund Vaterländischer Jugend (Coalition of the Patriotic Youth) and became chief executive in 1960. He appeared at events of the Bund Heimattreuer (Coalition of Loyal Patriots) and Manfred Roeder's Deutsche Bürgerinitiative ("German Citizen Initiative) and became involved in the Deutsche Reichspartei (German Imperial Party) and the National Democratic Party of Germany for which he appeared as candidate. He also organised Wehrsportübungen (Defensive Sport Exercises) and became an "avid arms dealer for right-wing terrorists". The bomb planters around Peter Naumann used equipment from Lembke to commit their attacks.

Lembke had verifiable contact with the terrorist Deutsche Aktionsgruppe (German Action Group) and the Wehrsportgruppe Hoffmann (Group of Defense Sport Hoffmann). Until his imprisonment, he was a forest ranger in Oechtringen next to Hanstedt in the district of Uelzen, close by a military training ground.

The day after the attack of the Oktoberfest in Munich on 26 September 1980, members of the Deutsche Aktionsgruppe around Raymund Hörnle and Sibylle Vorderbrügge provided information that Lembke had offered them weapons, explosives and ammunition and had told them about his extensive arsenal. This tip off was investigated by the prosecutors almost a year later when, by chance, lumberjacks encountered one of the depots. Lembke admitted in the remand center the location of his 33 illegal weapon and ammunition arsenals which caused quite a stir in the media when found in 1981 in Uelzen near Lüneburg Heath. They contained automatic weapons, 13,520 shots of munition, 50 bazookas, 156 kg explosives and 258 hand grenades. The amount and quality of the military equipment pointed to Lembke, a part of the secret organisation Gladio, of which such weapon arsenals are characteristic. Lembke was found hanged in his prison cell on 1 November 1981, the day before his hearing by a federal prosecutor. He had announced beforehand that he would disclose vast information about his backers. The investigation in that direction was stopped soon after Lembke's death and his death was portrayed as one of a maverick, who built up his arsenal out of fear for a Soviet invasion. The origins of the weapons remain unknown.
