= Heinz Arzberger =

Austrian footballer

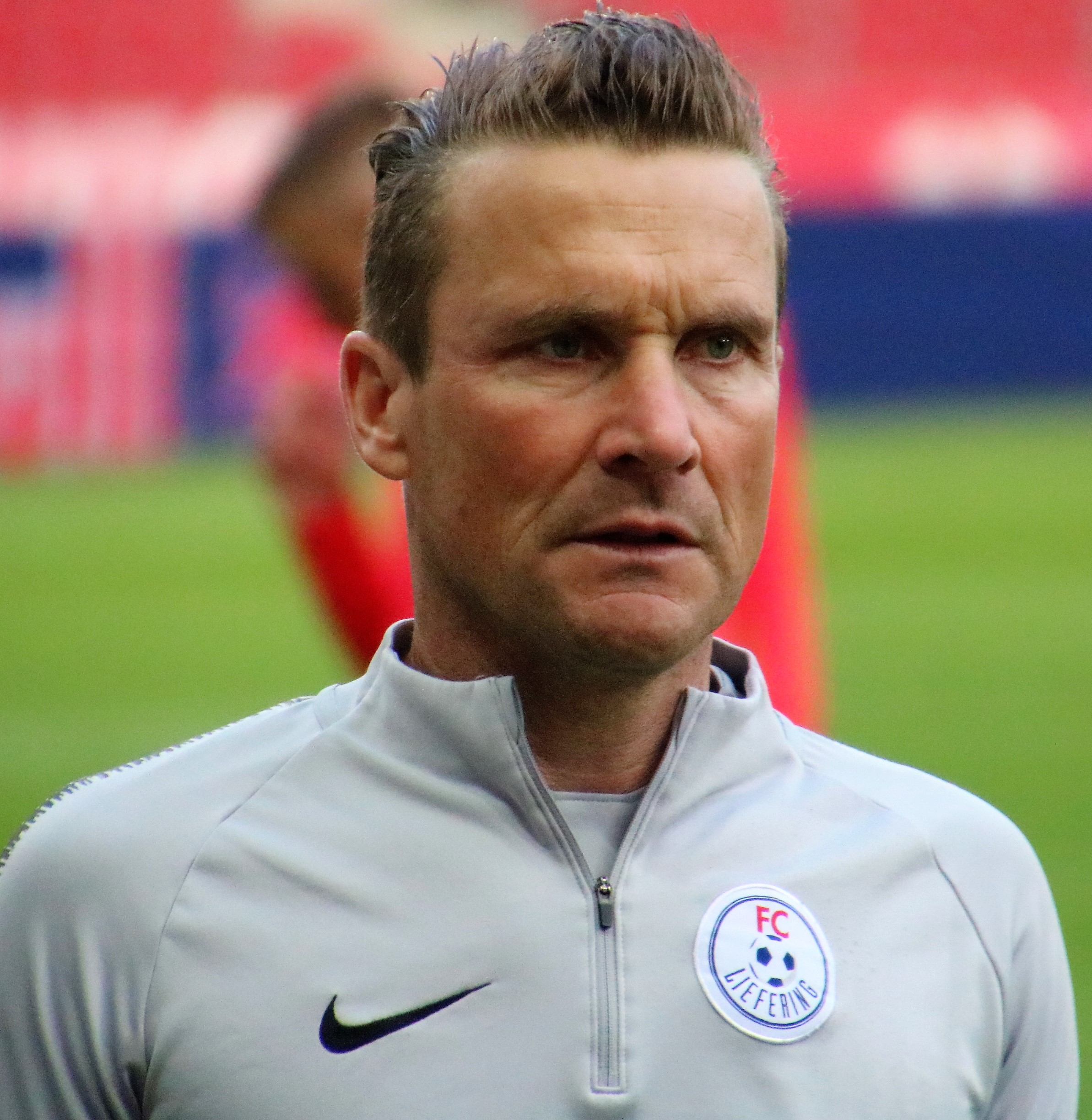
- Arzberger in 2019

Personal information
- Full name: Heinz-Dieter Arzberger
- Date of birth: 27 August 1972 (age 54)
- Place of birth: Wolfsberg, Austria
- Height: 1.85 m (6 ft 1 in)
- Position: Goalkeeper

Team information
- Current team: FC Liefering (goalkeeping coach)

Senior career*
| Years | Team | Apps | (Gls) |
| 1991–1995 | Wolfsberger AC | | |
| 1995–1997 | Sturm Graz | 9 | (0) |
| 1997 | SV Gerasdorf | 5 | (0) |
| 1997–1998 | SKN St. Pölten | 31 | (0) |
| 1999–2010 | Red Bull Salzburg | 134 | (0) |
| 2010–2011 | Red Bull Junior Salzburg | 21 | (0) |

International career
| 2004 | Austria | 1 | (0) |
- * Club domestic league appearances and goals

Heinz-Dieter Arzberger (born 27 August 1972) is a Austrian former professional footballer who played as a goalkeeper. He has gained one cap for the Austria national team in a friendly in 2004. Arzberger played at Red Bull Salzburg for over a decade, making him one of the club's longest-serving players. He won the Austrian Bundesliga three times with Red Bull Salzburg, in 2007, 2009 and 2010.

After the end of his career, he became a goalkeepinh coach of FC Liefering in 2012.

== Honours ==
Sturm Graz

- Austrian Cup: 1995–96, 1996–97
- Austrian Supercup: 1996

Red Bull Salzburg

- Austrian Bundesliga: 2006–07, 2008–09, 2009–10
