= Hynes =

Hynes Ó hEidhin Hines, Hinds, Hindes, Haynes, Haines, Hynds
- Parent house: Uí Fiachrach Aidhne
- Country: Connachta
- Founder: Eidhean mac Cléireach
- Historic seat: Dunguaire Castle

Hynes is a surname, many examples of which originate as the anglicisation the Irish name Ó hEidhin.

== Etymology ==
According to the Oxford Dictionary of Family Names in Britain and Ireland, the modern name Hynes and its variants derive from two quite different medieval names.

1. The Irish Ó hEidhin, which means 'descendant of Eidhin'. The dictionary adds that Eidhin itself is 'a personal name of uncertain origin. It may be a derivative of eidhean "ivy", or it may represent an altered form of the place-name Aidhne’ and that 'the principal family of this name is descended from Guaire of Aidhne, King of Connacht. From the 7th century for over a thousand years they were chiefs of a territory in east County Galway. There appears to have been another branch of the family located in east County Limerick'.
2. The Middle English name Hine (with the addition of the genitive -s case ending, implying that the name-bearer was the child of a father called Hine, or addition of -s on the analogy of such names). This occupational name derives from Old English hīne ('household servant, farm labourer'), but in the Middle English period could also mean 'farm manager' and also be used of high-status people serving in a lordly household.

== Distribution ==
Around 2011, there were 3320 bearers of the surname Hynes in Great Britain and 3605 in Ireland. In 1881, there were 717 bearers of the name in Great Britain, with higher frequencies in the north of England, especially Lancashire; Devon and Cornwall; and also central Scotland, especially Lanarkshire.

== Irish clan ==
According to historians C. Thomas Cairney and John O'Hart, the O'Hynes clan were a chiefly family of the Uí Fiachrach Aidhne who were the southern branch of the Uí Fiachrach. Cairney states that the Uí Fiachrach were in turn a tribe of the Gaels, the fourth and final wave of Celtic settlement in Ireland which took place during the first century BC. Their seat was at Dunguaire Castle, County Galway.

== People ==
Notable people with surname include:

- Eidhean mac Cléireach, fl. 800, ancestor of the Ó hEidhin/Hynes family of south County Galway
- Andrew Hynes (1750–1800), founder of Elizabethtown, Kentucky
- Charles J. Hynes (1935–2019), American lawyer and politician, District Attorney of Kings County, New York (1990–2013)
- Daniel Hynes (born 1968), Comptroller of the State of Illinois
- Dev Hynes (born 1985), musician known under the moniker Blood Orange, former member of the band Test Icicles
- Garry Hynes (born 1953), award-winning Irish theatre director
- Jessica Hynes (born 1972), English actress and writer, most renowned as one of the stars of the UK sitcom Spaced
- James Hynes (born 1955), contemporary American novelist
- John Hynes (disambiguation)
- Jon Hynes, American classical concert pianist
- Laurence Hynes Halloran (1765–1831), pioneer schoolteacher and journalist in Australia
- Louis Hynes (born 2001), English actor
- Marc Hynes (born 1978), British race car driver
- Martin Hynes, American screenwriter, director, actor and producer of independent films
- Mary Hynes (broadcaster), Canadian radio and television broadcaster
- Patricia Hynes, American attorney
- Peter Hynes (footballer) (born 1983), Irish footballer
- Peter Hynes (rugby union) (born 1982), Australian rugby union player
- Red Hynes (1897–1952), American municipal police officer and strikebreaker
- Ron Hynes, Canadian folk singer-songwriter from Newfoundland
- Samuel Hynes (1924–2019), American historian and writer
- Syd Hynes (1944–2024), English rugby league player and coach
- Thomas Hynes (disambiguation)
- Tyler Hynes (born 1986), Canadian actor

Fictional characters

- Joe Hynes, character in James Joyce's novel Ulysses
- Duke of Rudling's animal-trainer Hynes, from Lassie Come-Home

Places

- Hynes, California now part of Paramount, California

== See also ==
- Hynes Convention Center, a 193,000 square feet (17,900 m^{2}) exhibition center in Boston's Back Bay
  - Hynes Convention Center (MBTA station), the MBTA stop at Convention Center
- Hyness, a character in Kirby Star Allies
- Hynes Athletic Center, a 2,611-seat multi-purpose arena in New Rochelle, New York
- Hines (disambiguation)
- Hein, a surname (including a list of people with the name)
- Heini, a given name and a surname (including a list of people with the name)
- Heyne, a surname (including a list of people with the name)
- Heine, a surname
- Heines, a surname
- Hines (name), a name
- Heinie (disambiguation)
- Irish clans
