= Hines =

Hines may refer to:

== Places in the United States ==
- Hines, Florida, an unincorporated community in Dixie County
- Hines, Illinois, an unincorporated community
- Hines, Minnesota, an unincorporated community
- Hines Township, Beltrami County, Minnesota
- Hines, Oregon, a city
- Hines, West Virginia, an unincorporated community
- Hines, Wisconsin, an unincorporated community

== People ==
- Hines (name), a list of people with the surname or given name

== Other ==
- Hines Creek, a village in Alberta, Canada
- Hines Interests Limited Partnership, an international real estate company

== See also ==
- Edward Hines, Jr., Veterans Administration Hospital
- Hines College of Architecture at the University of Houston
- Hines' Raid, U.S. Confederate exploratory mission
- Hinesville, Georgia, United States
- Ulmus americana 'Hines', elm cultivar
- Hynes
- Himes
- Justice Hines (disambiguation)
- Hine (TV series), 1971 British television series
