= Heinz (surname) =

Heinz is a German surname and cognate of Henry. Notable people with this surname include:

== Acting, directing, and editing ==
- David Heinz (born c. 1980), American film editor
- Drue Heinz (1915–2018), British-born American actress, philanthropist, arts patron, and socialite
- Gerard Heinz (1904–1972), German actor
- Gerd Heinz (born 1940), German stage, film and television actor, stage director and theatre manager
- Julia von Heinz (born 1976), German film director and screenwriter
- Wolfgang Heinz (actor) (1900–1982), Austrian and East German actor and theater director

== Business ==
- Christopher Heinz (born 1973), American businessman and investment manager; son of John Heinz and Teresa Heinz
- Henry J. Heinz (1844–1919), American entrepreneur of Palatine descent; founder of the H. J. Heinz Company
- Jack Heinz (1908–1987), American business executive; CEO of the H. J. Heinz Company and grandson of Henry J. Heinz
- Teresa Heinz (born 1938), Portuguese-American businesswoman and philanthropist; widow of John Heinz and wife of John Kerry

== Military ==
- Edward J. Heinz (born 1932) American air force general
- Richard D. Heinz (born 1987), United States Navy rear admiral

== Politics ==
- Christian Heinz (born 1976), German politician
- John Heinz III (1938–1991), U.S. senator from Pennsylvania and son of Jack Heinz
- Matt Heinz (born 1977), American doctor and politician
- Wolfgang Heinz (politician) (born 1938), German politician

== Sports ==
=== Association football (soccer) ===
- Marek Heinz (born 1977), Czech footballer
- Robert Heinz (1924–1972), German football manager
- Tim Heinz (born 1984), Luxembourg footballer

=== Other sports ===
- Andreas Heinz (badminton) (born 1991) German badminton player
- Bob Heinz (1947–2026), American football player
- George Heinz (1891–1966), Australian rules footballer
- Katharina Heinz (born 1987), German skeleton racer
- Lara Heinz (born 1981), Luxembourgish swimmer
- Lilian Heinz (born 1935), Argentine sprinter
- Pauline Heinz (born 2001), German field hockey player
- Peter Heinz (born 1954), German sports shooter
- Rick Heinz (born 1955), Canadian ice hockey player
- W. C. Heinz (1915–2008), American sportswriter
- Willi Heinz (born 1986), New Zealand rugby union footballer

== Others ==
- André Heinz (born 1969), American environmentalist; son of John Heinz and Teresa Heinz
- Andreas Heinz (psychotherapist) (born 1960), German psychiatrist and psychotherapist
- Charles Heinz (singer) (1940–2011), American singer
- Elise B. Heinz (1935–2014), American lawyer and politician
- Erhard Heinz (1924-2017), German mathematician
- Federico Heinz, Argentinian programmer
- Gerhard Heinz (born 1927), Austrian composer and pianist
- Karl Heinz (born 1938), Austrian architect
- Karl Malte von Heinz (1904–1971), Austrian architect active in India
- Pius Heinz (born 1989), German professional poker player
- Rust Heinz (1914–1939), American car and boat designer; brother of Jack Heinz
- Wolfgang Heinz (criminologist) (born 1942), German criminologist and writer

== See also ==
- Heinz (given name)
- Heine, surname
- Heines, surname
- Hines (name)
- Heintz, surname
