= Heine =

Heine is both a surname and a given name of German origin. People with that name include:

== People with the surname ==
- Albert Heine (1867–1949), German actor
- Alice Heine (1858–1925), American-born princess of Monaco
- Armand Heine (1818–1883), French banker and philanthropist
- Ben Heine (born 1983), Belgian visual artist and music producer
- Bernd Heine (born 1939), German linguist and Afrikanist
- Bernhard Heine (1800–1846), German physician and bone specialist
- Bill Heine (1945–2019), British radio presenter
- Bud Heine (1900–1976), American baseball player
- Cariba Heine (born 1988), Australian actress
- Carl Wilhelm Heine (1838–1877), German surgeon
- Charles Heiné (1920–1971), French footballer
- Dwight Heine (1919-1984), Marshallese politician
- Eduard Heine (1821–1881), German mathematician
- Edmund Carl Heine, German convicted of espionage in 1941
- Ellen Heine (1907–1989), botanist, photographer and painter
- Ferdinand Heine (1809–1894), German ornithologist and collector
- Ferdinand Heine (junior) (1840–1920), German plant breeder and ornithologist
- Friedrich Wilhelm Heine (1845–1921), German painter
- Gustav Heine von Geldern (1812–1886), Austrian publicist
- Gustav Otto Ludolf Heine (1868–1959), German-American piano business owner and automobile builder
- Harry Heine (1928–2004), Canadian maritime and landscape painter
- Heinrich Heine (1797–1856), German poet
- Helme Heine (1941–2025), German children's book author
- Hilda Heine (born 1951), Marshallese educator and politician, President of the Marshall Islands
- Jared Heine (born 1984), Marshallese swimmer
- Joseph Heine (1803–1877), German physician and civil servant
- Jakob Heine (1800–1879), German orthopaedist
- Johann Georg Heine (1771–1838), German orthopaedist and doctor
- Jutta Heine (born 1940), German athlete
- Karl Heine (1819–1888), German lawyer and entrepreneur
- Karsten Heine (born 1955), German football player and manager
- Klaus Heine, German marketing lecturer
- Leina'ala Kalama Heine (died 2015), American kumu hula and hula instructor
- Max Heine (1911–1988), American investor and fund manager
- Maximilian Meyer Heine (1807–1879), German doctor and Russian state councilor
- Michel Heine (1819–1890), French banker and businessman
- Pete Heine (1928–2005), American politician
- Peter Heine (1928–2005), South African cricketer
- Robert von Heine-Geldern (1885–1968), Austrian ethnologist, historian, and archaeologist
- Salomon Heine (1767–1844), German merchant and banker
- Sara Heine (1858–1953), Russian-born Jewish actress
- Steven Heine (born 1950), American professor of religion and history
- Steven Heine (psychologist), Canadian professor
- Thomas Heine, Marshallese politician and government minister
- Thomas Theodor Heine (1867–1948), German painter and illustrator
- Veronika Heine (born 1986) Austrian table tennis player
- Vita Heine (born 1984), Latvian-Norwegian racing cyclist
- Volker Heine (born 1930), New Zealand-British physicist
- Werner Heine (1935–2022), German football player
- Wilbur Heine, Marshallese politician and government minister
- Wilhelm Heine (1827–1885), American painter and soldier
- William C. Heine (1911–1991), Canadian author and newspaper editor
- Wolfgang Heine (1861–1944), German jurist
- Yosef Heine, Israeli football player, active 1954–1964

== People with the given name ==
- Heine Araújo (born 1984), Brazilian artistic gymnast
- Heinie Beau (1911–1987), American jazz composer and musician
- Heinie Conklin (1880-1959), American actor
- Heine Fernandez (born 1966), Danish football player
- Heine Havreki (1514–1576), Norwegian Lutheran pastor
- Heine Jensen (born 1977), Danish handball coach
- Heine Kanimea, Nauruan basketball player
- Heine Meine (1896–1968), American baseball player
- Heine Strathmann, German sprint canoeist, active in the late 1930s
- Heine Totland (born 1970), Norwegian singer
- Heine Wang (born 1963), Norwegian businessperson
- Herman Heine Goldstine (1913–2004), American mathematician and computer scientist
- Peter Heine Nielsen (born 1973), Danish chess player
- Veitel-Heine Ephraim (1703–1775), jeweller to the Prussian Court

== Fictional ==
- Heine Rammsteiner, protagonist in the Dogs: Bullets & Carnage manga
- Heine Westenfluss, a character in the anime television series Mobile Suit Gundam SEED
- Heine Wittgenstein, protagonist of the manga The Royal Tutor
- Heine, a character in the 2022 video game HARVESTELLA

== See also ==
- Hein, a surname (including a list of people with the name)
- Heini, a given name and a surname (including a list of people with the name)
- Heyne, a surname (including a list of people with the name)
- Heines, a surname
- Hines (name), a name
- Hynes, a surname
- Heinie (disambiguation)
