= Charles Hines =

Charles Hines may refer to:

- Charles A. Hines (1935–2013), American soldier and educator
- Charles Hines (director) (1892–1936), American actor and film director
- Charles Hines (died 1897), executed Australian prisoner
- Charles Cragg Hines (born 1945), American journalist
- Charles Hines, fictional character, London debut role, c. 1905, of John Barrymore

== See also ==
- Charles Heinz (disambiguation)
- Charles J. Hynes, Brooklyn lawyer, politician and prosecutor
