= Wolfgang Heinz =

Wolfgang Heinz may refer to:

- Wolfgang Heinz (actor) (1900–1984), Austrian and East German actor and theater director
- Wolfgang Heinz (criminologist) (born 1942), German criminologist and writer on jurisprudence
- Wolfgang Heinz (politician) (born 1938), German politician of the Free Democratic Party
