= Reini =

Surname list

Reini is a surname. Notable people with the surname include:

- Aarne Reini (1906–1974), Finnish wrestler
- Antti Reini (born 1964), Finnish actor
- Juha Reini (born 1975), Finnish footballer

== See also ==
- Heini
- Reinis
