= Echium plantagineum in Australia =

Species of flowering plant

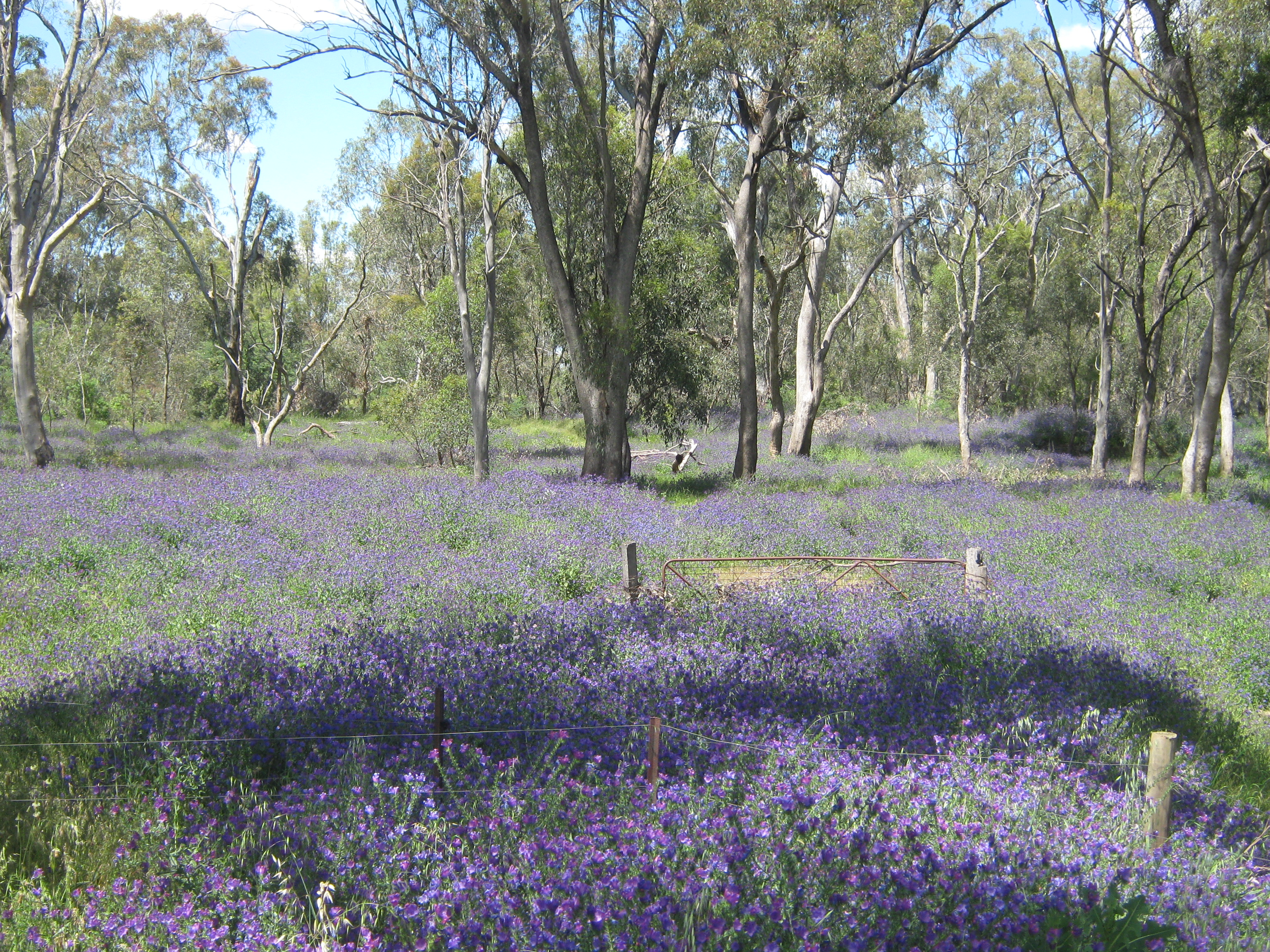
A field of Echium plantagineum near Shepparton, Victoria

Echium plantagineum, commonly known as Paterson's Curse or Salvation Jane, is an invasive plant species in Australia.

E. plantagineum is known for its rapid growth, high seed production, and ability to thrive in disturbed soils, making it a major invasive species in agricultural areas. It competes with pasture grasses and it can be toxic to grazing livestock. Originally native to N.W. Africa, the Iberian Peninsula and Atlantic Western Europe, it was introduced to Australia in the 19th century, where it has since become a serious environmental and economical problem.

== Common names ==
In Australia, the common names for E. plantagineum are Paterson's Curse and Salvation Jane. Other names for the plant include Blueweed, Lady Campbell weed, Riverina bluebell, Purple bugloss and Ucolta Curse.

=== Paterson's Curse ===
Mrs Paterson's Curse is the name most commonly used for this plant in Australia. The name traces back to the family whose property the weed escaped from in the late 1890s. Originally, the family's name was spelled 'Patterson', and the common name, 'Paterson's Curse', emerged from a simple spelling mistake that was perpetuated over time.

When the Patterson family relocated from South Yarra in 1869, Eliza Patterson, an avid gardener, acquired some plants from a garden along the way. These plants eventually became established on her property and on the adjoining reserve. Her daughter, however, later disputed this theory, stating that she had never seen the flower in her mother's garden. The homestead was situated about a mile southwest of the Cumberoona Stock Reserve, northeast of Albury, in New South Wales. After the Hume Reservoir was completed in 1936, the property was submerged under water.

In a letter to Joseph Maiden dated 15 March 1904, E.A. Hamilton of the Cumberoona estate, describes how plants from the property of a Mr. Paterson spread onto a stock route. From there, the plant was carried into the Riverina, surrounding areas of Victoria, and eventually throughout southeastern Australia.

"This weed was introduced to this district by the people (Patersons), who lived in a small farm adjoining this estate, as a garden flower, about twenty-five years ago. It did not spread much at first, but grew out on a small hill near the house, gradually enlarging every year. However, about eight years ago it got through the fence on to a travelling stock reserve and into our paddocks. Then, as soon as the stock began to travel through it, it spread very quickly, and now it is all over the district, particularly on stock routes and reserves, being carried to these by the stock".

The letter suggests that Patterson's introduction of the plant occurred around 1880, with its spread beginning around 1896. By 1905, it was spreading around Albury and by 1916, it had been reported from the Upper Murray, Bourke, Nyngan, Wilcannia, Dubbo, Hay and Jingellic.

=== Salvation Jane ===
The name Salvation Jane is primarily used in South Australia, particularly in the northern agricultural regions of that state. The earliest recorded use was by John McConnell Black in 1907, who stated that the name was used in the northern parts of the state. In a speech to the Field Naturalists Society of South Australia, he says:

"It has been christened "Salvation Jane," because it bears some resemblance to the poke bonnet which is worn, or was worn, not long ago by the Salvation Army lasses".

An alternative explanation for the name is that the plant provided a 'salvation' for landholders in the semi-arid grazing lands of the mid-north of South Australia during drought years. However, this is likely a later interpretation rather than the original meaning.

The origin of the name "Jane" remains unclear. While several theories have been proposed, one of which refers to a Salvationist named Jane in Port Pirie, there are no conclusive primary sources.

=== Lady Campbell weed ===
The name originates from Lady Lucy Ann Cockburn-Campbell (1850–1926), wife of Sir Thomas Cockburn-Campbell, who was residing not far from Broomehill in Western Australia during the construction of the Great Southern Railway. She introduced this species as a garden plant soon after 1900, and from there, it became widespread along parts of the railway. The initial spread of the weed was likely a result of her introduction, although the plant had already been recorded in Western Australia as early as 1881.

== History ==
E. plantagineum was deliberately introduced as an ornamental plant in the 1840s through seed importation from England, via Madeira, the Canary Islands, and South Africa, the main shipping route before the opening of the Suez Canal. Accidental introductions may have also occurred, such as with contaminated canary and cumin seeds from Morocco and France, as well as in agricultural produce like fodder.

The earliest recorded instance in Australia dates back to 1843, when it was introduced as an ornamental plant in the Camden gardens of John Macarthur near Sydney. It was listed as a cultivated species in the Melbourne, Sydney and Adelaide Botanic Gardens in the 1850s under the name E. violaceum. It may also have been the species referred to as E. italicum from the Royal Tasmanian Botanical Gardens in Hobart. It is uncertain, however, whether these early introductions resulted in later escape and naturalisation.

The deliberate introduction and spread of the plant were likely promoted by the availability of seeds for purchase. It first began appearing in nursery catalogues in 1845 and continued to appear throughout the rest of the nineteenth century. In one example, E.B. Heyne, an Adelaide nurseryman, listed the plant under the names E. violaceum or E. violaceum grandiflorum in his seed catalogue of flower plants in 1882.

E. plantagineum is believed to have been naturalized in Victoria by 1858, and in 1859, J.D. Hooker reported it as naturalized in New South Wales. By 1869, it had also naturalized in Tasmania; by 1889, in Western Australia; by 1916, in Queensland; and by 1956, in the Northern Territory. However, some of these early records have been disputed, as introduction may have been confused with establishment or naturalization. It is likely that some specimens were collected from cultivation or may refer to minor garden escapes in the area.

The spread of E. plantagineum appears to have begun at four, or possibly more, isolated 'infestation points' by 1900, with later movement as migrating fronts from these points, and, finally, amalgamation of the spreading fronts. It is concluded that a significant naturalization event occurred at Gladstone, South Australia, in 1889, and another at Cumberoona near Albury, New South Wales, in 1890. Another major outbreak was later recorded in Western Australia around 1900. By the early 20th century, E. plantagineum was officially declared a noxious weed in the shires of Toowong (1904) and Maldon (1908), and the whole of Victoria in 1911.

Paterson's curse is now a dominant broadleaf pasture weed through much of New South Wales, the Australian Capital Territory, Victoria, South Australia, and Tasmania. It also infests native grasslands, heathlands, and woodlands.

== Description ==
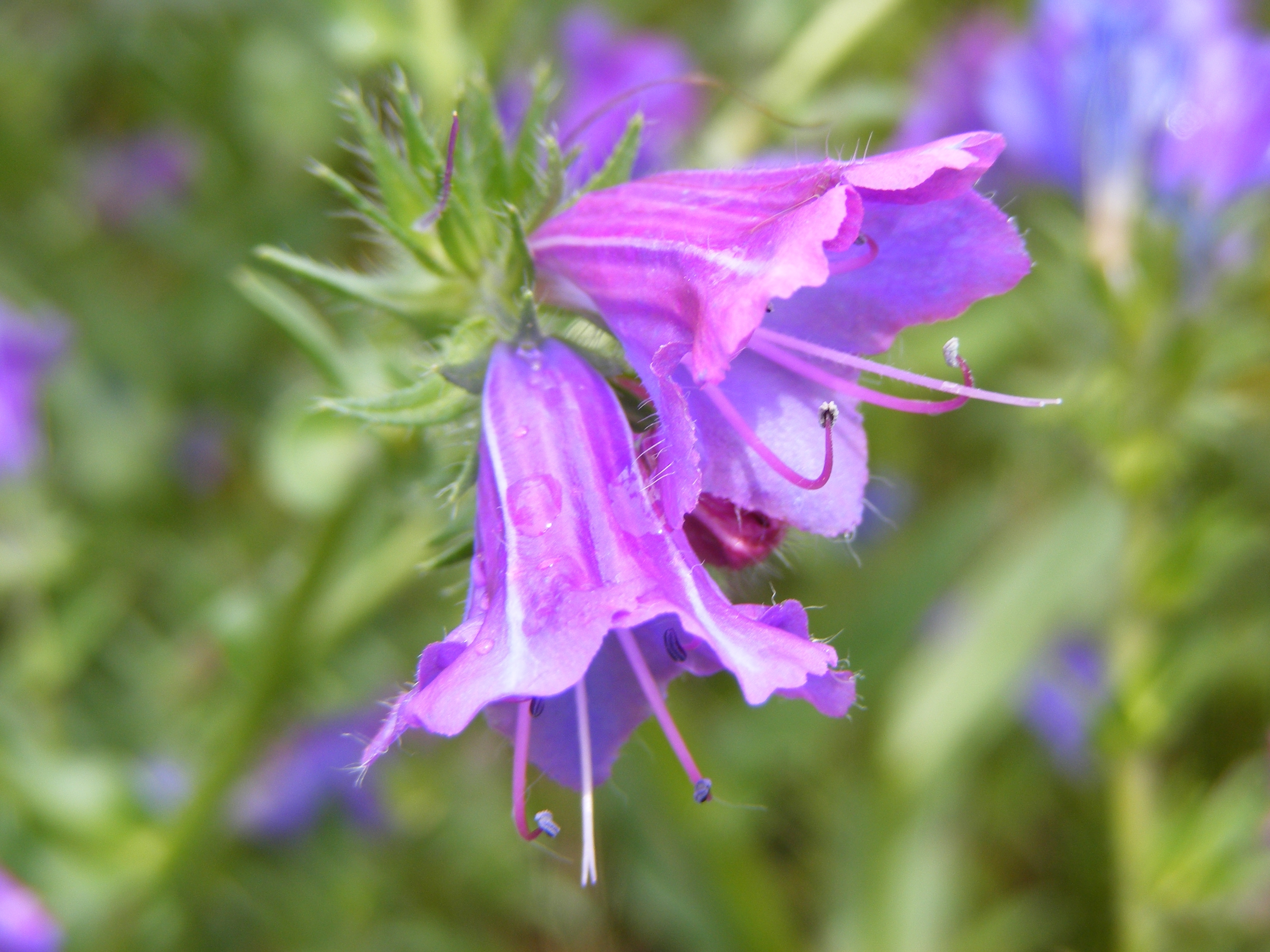
E. plantagineum flowers in spring, growing adjacent to the freeway at Crafers, South Australia.

=== Appearance ===
The plant has hairy, dark green, broadly oval rosette leaves to 30 cm long. The several seeding stems grow to 120 cm in height and develop branches with age. Flowers develop in clusters; they are purple, tubular and 2–3 cm long with five petals. It has a fleshy taproot with smaller laterals.

=== Growth ===
Although generally an autumn-germinating, spring-flowering annual, Paterson's curse has become highly adaptable to Australian erratic rainfall events, and given suitable rainfall, some plants germinate at any time of year, but the plant never survives for more than one year. It is a very prolific seed producer; heavy infestations can yield up to 30 000 seeds/m^{2}. Paterson's curse can germinate under a wide variety of temperature conditions, tolerates dry periods well, and responds vigorously to fertiliser. If cut by a lawnmower, it quickly recovers and sends out new shoots and flowers.

The plant disperses by movement of seeds – on the wool or fur of animals, the alimentary tracts of grazing animals or birds, movement in water, and most importantly as a contaminant of hay or grain. This is most noticeable in times of drought, when considerable movement of fodder and livestock occurs.

It can rapidly establish a large population on disturbed ground and competes vigorously with both smaller plants and the seedlings of regenerating overstorey species. Its spread has been greatly aided by human-induced habitat degradation, particularly the removal of perennial grasses through overgrazing by sheep and cattle and the introduction of the rabbit. Paterson's curse is rarely able to establish itself in habitats where the native vegetation is healthy and undisturbed.

== Control ==
=== Chemical ===
Control of the plant is carried out by hand (for small infestations) or with any of a variety of herbicides, and must be continued over many years to reduce the seedbank. (Most seeds germinate in the first year, but some survive for as long as five years before germinating.) In the longer term, perennial grasses (which do not need to regenerate from seed each year) can outcompete Paterson's curse, and any increase in perennial cover produces a direct decrease in it. However, the annual cost in control measures and lost production in Australia was estimated (in a 1985 study by the Industries Assistance Commission) to be over $30 million, compared to $2 million per year in benefits.

=== Biological ===
The Australian Commonwealth Scientific and Industrial Research Organisation (CSIRO) has carried out research on numerous classical biological control solutions, and of the 100-odd insects found feeding on Paterson's curse in the Mediterranean, judged six safe to release in Australia without endangering crops or native plants. The leaf-mining moth Dialectica scalariella, the crown weevil Mogulones larvatus, root weevil Mogulones geographicus, and flea beetle Longitarsus echii are now currently widely distributed in southern Australia and can be found easily on most large Paterson's curse plants encountered. The crown weevil and flea beetle are proving highly effective. While the CSIRO is cautiously optimistic, biological control agents are expected to take many years to be fully effective. The most recent economic analysis, however, suggests that biological control has already brought nearly $1.2 B in benefits to Australia by reducing the amount of Paterson's curse in pastures. Investment into the biological control of Paterson's curse has already reaped a benefit cost ratio of 52:1.

== Toxicity ==
E. plantagineum is sometimes considered a useful fodder species, especially the young growth which is readily eaten by stock, particularly sheep. However, it contains pyrrolizidine alkaloids and bioactive shikonins in the root that can be toxic to livestock. Consumption of the plant can result in chronic liver damage and mortality, especially if substantial amounts are eaten over prolonged periods. Ten alkaloids have been identified of which echimidine is the most toxic. Pigs are most susceptible to poisoning, followed by horses, whilst cattle and goats are least affected. The increased susceptibility in pigs and horses is due to their being non-ruminants, lacking the necessary microorganisms in their stomachs to break down pyrrolizidine alkaloids.

Paterson's curse can kill horses and irritate the udders of dairy cows and the skin of humans. After the 2003 Canberra bushfires, over 40 horses were recorded as put down after eating the weed.

== See also ==
- Invasive species in Australia
