= Charles Heinz =

Charles Heinz may refer to:

- Charles Heinz (singer) (1940–2011), musician and religious leader
- Charles Heinz (fl. 1975), police officer allegedly maimed by employees of Morris Levy

== See also ==
- Charles Hines (disambiguation)
