= AAFES Depot Grünstadt =

GRDC Gruenstadt Distribution Center of the AAFES

Coordinates: 49.5545°N 8.1763°E

AAFES Depot Grünstadt is the German name for the GRDC Gruenstadt Distribution Center of the AAFES. In Grünstadt it is simply called the “depot”. The "depot" was founded in 1953. The bakery located in the depot Grünstadt is providing most of the bakery products for US Service Members and their families in Germany and Europe. In the 1970 and 1980 the depot was one of the most important source for work in Grünstadt, but by 2007 it has lost most of its economic importance for the regional economy of Grünstadt and its surroundings like the Leiningerland.

Previously under U.S. Army Garrison Mannheim, in May 2011 the depot became part of U.S. Army Garrison Baden-Württemberg. On 1 October 2011 the depot became part of the US Army's Kaiserslautern Military Community, in addition to the bakery (which opened in the 1980s) since 1996 it has been the site of a Culligan bottled water plant. It previously also produced ice cream, meat and developed photographs.

In 2014 the site produced 250 different items for the US military and provided cold storage for a further 200 items. In that year it produced 5,000,000 US gallons (19,000,000 L; 4,200,000 imp gal) of bottled water. It provided supplies to 100 sites in 25 countries.
