= Himes =

Himes is a surname. Notable people with the surname include:

- Andrew Himes (born 1950), American author and social activist
- Charles Francis Himes (1838-1918), American science professor at Dickinson College
- Chester Himes (1909–1984), African-American writer
- Dick Himes (1946–2026), American football offensive lineman
- Donald Himes, Canadian actor in the children's television series Butternut Square and Mr. Dressup
- George H. Himes (1844–1940), American pioneer and historian in Oregon
- Gregory A. Himes (1966), American College Basketball Coach
- Harriette Himes (1930–1997), birth name of American Ann Bishop (journalist)
- Jack Himes (1878–1949), American baseball player
- Jim Himes (born 1966), American politician
- Joseph H. Himes (1885–1960), American politician
- Joshua Vaughan Himes (1805–1895), American Christian leader and publisher
- Kenneth R. Himes (born 1950), American Roman Catholic theologian
- Lance Himes, American administrator, a defendant in Obergefell v. Himes
- Larry Himes (born 1940), American Major League Baseball general manager
- Michael Himes, American priest
- Norman Himes (1903–1958), Canadian ice hockey centre
- Norman E. Himes (1899-1949), American sociologist and economist
- Tyruss Himes (born 1972), American rapper known as Big Syke
- William Himes, noted composer for brass bands

== See also ==
- Himes (disambiguation)
- Hime (surname), including a list of people with that surname
- Hines (name), including a list of people with that name
