= Heintz =

Heintz is a surname. Notable people with the surname include:

- Anatol Heintz (1898–1975), Norwegian palaeontologist
- Bob Heintz (born 1970), American professional golfer
- Chris Heintz (baseball) (born 1974), former Major League Baseball catcher
- Chris Heintz (aeronautical engineer) (1938–2021), French and Canadian aeronautical engineer
- Emile Heintz, colleague of Michel Brunet, French paleontologist
- Fred Heintz, former Australian rules footballer
- Heintz Kluger (Haim Yavin) (born 1932), Israeli television anchor and documentary filmmaker
- Joseph Heintz the Elder (1564–1609), Swiss painter, draftsman and architect
- Kurt Heintz (1912–1944), highly decorated Hauptmann in the Luftwaffe during World War II
- Susy Heintz (born 1947), American politician from the state of Michigan
- Victor Heintz (1876–1968), U.S. Representative from Ohio and, highly decorated veteran of World War I
- Wilhelm Heinrich Heintz (1817–1880), German structural chemist
- Wulff-Dieter Heintz (1930–2006), German astronomer who moved to the United States

== See also ==
- Freund-Heintz House, Cincinnati, Ohio, United States
- Heintz Peak, in the Welch Mountains, north of Mount Acton in Palmer Land, Antarctica
- Heinz (surname)
- Hentz, surname
