= Henry Heinz (disambiguation) =

Henry Heinz (Henry John Heinz, 1844–1919) was the founder of the H. J. Heinz Company.

Henry Heinz may also refer to the following notable people:

- Jack Heinz (Henry John Heinz II, 1908–1987), CEO of H. J. Heinz Company and grandson of Henry John Heinz
- John Heinz (Henry John Heinz III, 1938–1991), U.S. Senator from Pennsylvania and son of Henry John Heinz II

== See also ==
- Heinz (surname)
