= Reinis =

Male given name

- Gender: Male
- Language: Latvian

Origin
- Region of origin: Latvia

Reinis is a Latvian masculine given name and surname and may refer to:

As a given name:

- Reinis Kaudzīte (1839–1920), Latvian schoolteacher and writer
- Reinis Nitišs (born 1995), Latvian rallycross driver
- Reinis Pozņaks (born 1977), Latvian politician
- Reinis Reinholds (born 1997), Latvian footballer
- Reinis Rozītis (born 1982), Latvian bobsledder and Olympic competitor
- Reinis Uzulnieks (born 1986), Latvian politician
- Reinis Zālītis (1943–2005), Latvian footballer
- Reinis Zusters (1919–1999), Latvian-born Australian artist

As a surname:

- Jānis Reinis (born 1960), Latvian actor
