= Heyne =

Heyne is a German surname. Notable people with the surname include:

- Alexander Heyne (1869-1927), German bookseller, specimen trader and entomologist
- Benjamin Heyne (1770–1819), botanist, naturalist, and surgeon
- Christian Gottlob Heyne (1729–1812), German classical scholar and archaeologist
- Dirk Heyne (born 1957), German football player and manager
- Ernst Bernard Heyne (1825–1881), German botanist
- Karel Heyne (1877–1947), Dutch botanist
- Moritz Heyne (1837–1906), Germanic linguist
- Paul Heyne (1931–2000), American economist

== See also ==
- Heyne (singer), South Korean singer
- Heyne Verlag, a German imprint of publishers Random House
- Heine, also a surname
- Chayyim, the basis for this name and similar spellings
