= Himes (disambiguation) =

Himes may refer to:

- Himes, a surname (including a list of people with that surname)
- Himes Creek Trail, in Lincoln County, Montana, United States
- Himes Pass, a mountain pass in Sanders County, Montana, United States
- Judge Himes, an American Thoroughbred racehorse, winner of the 1903 Kentucky Derby
- HIghly Maneuverable Experimental Space vehicle (HIMES), a Japanese former spaceplane project, now superseded by WIRES (WInged REusable Sounding rocket)
