= Heines =

Heines is a German language surname. It is similar to Heine.

== List of people with the surname ==
- Edmund Heines (1897–1934), German Nazi politician
- Martin Heines (born 1962), American politician from Texas

== See also ==
- Haines (disambiguation)
- Heinz (surname)
- Heine
- Hines (name)
- Hynes
