= Grünstadt =

- Town
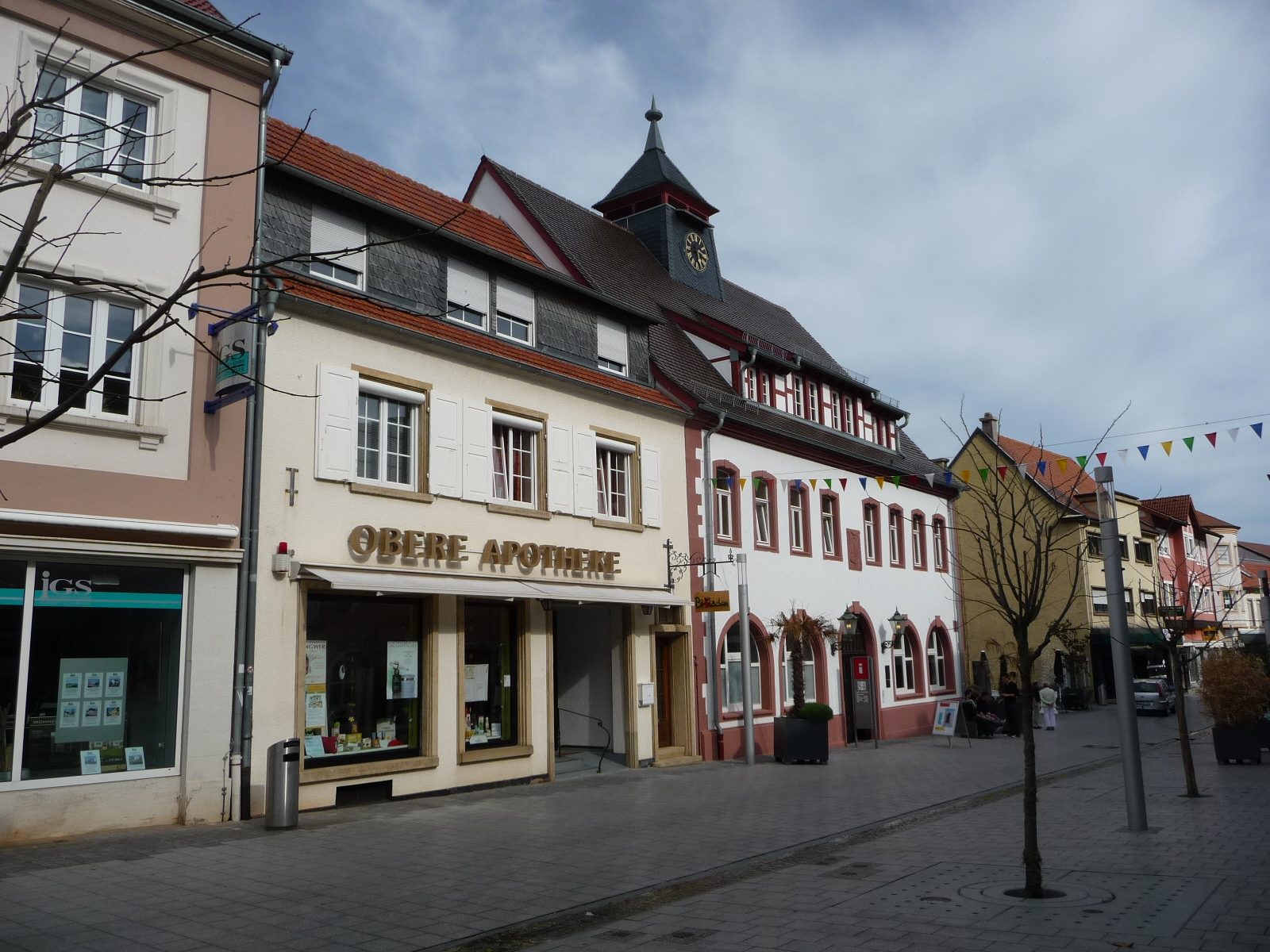
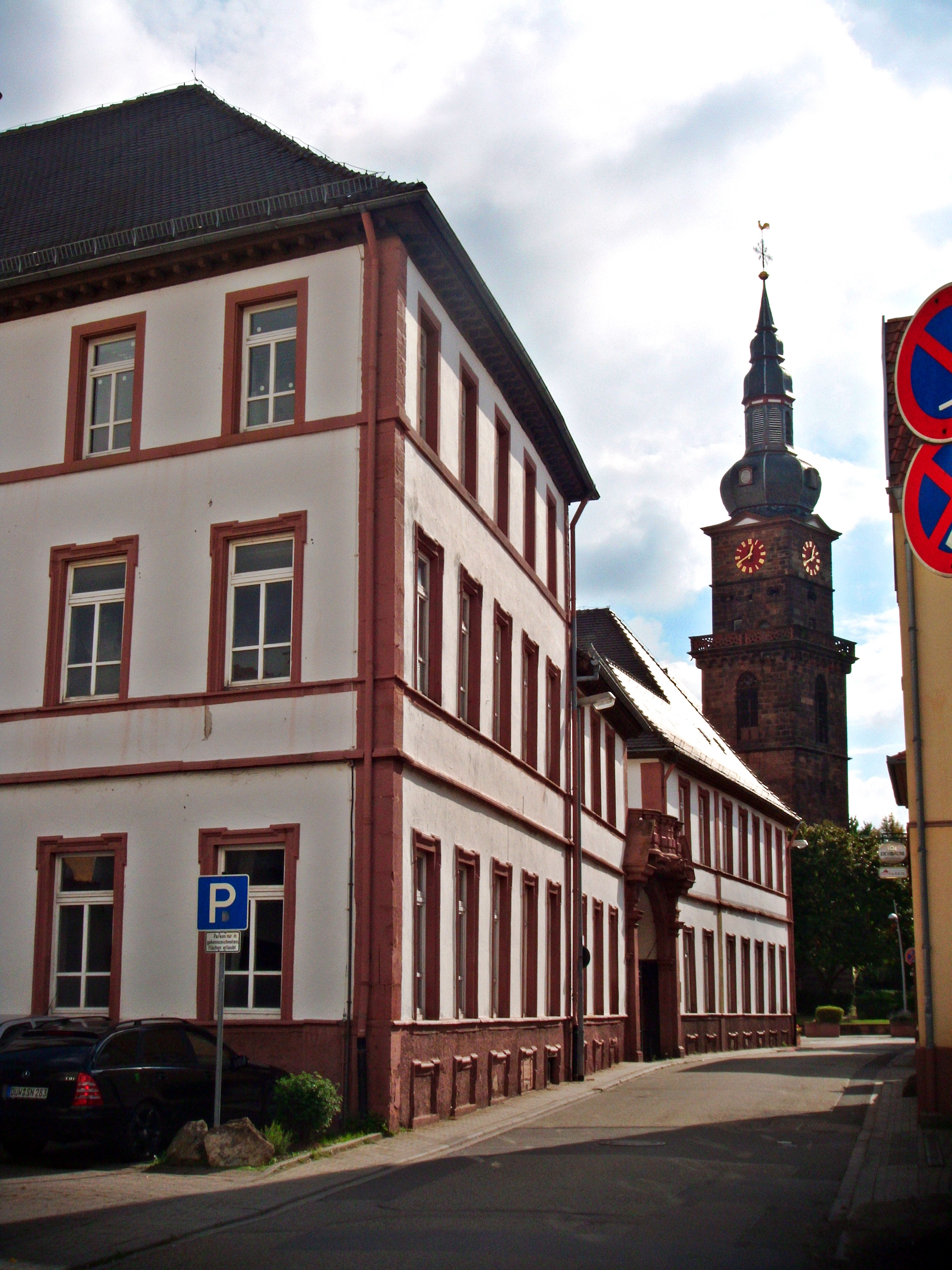
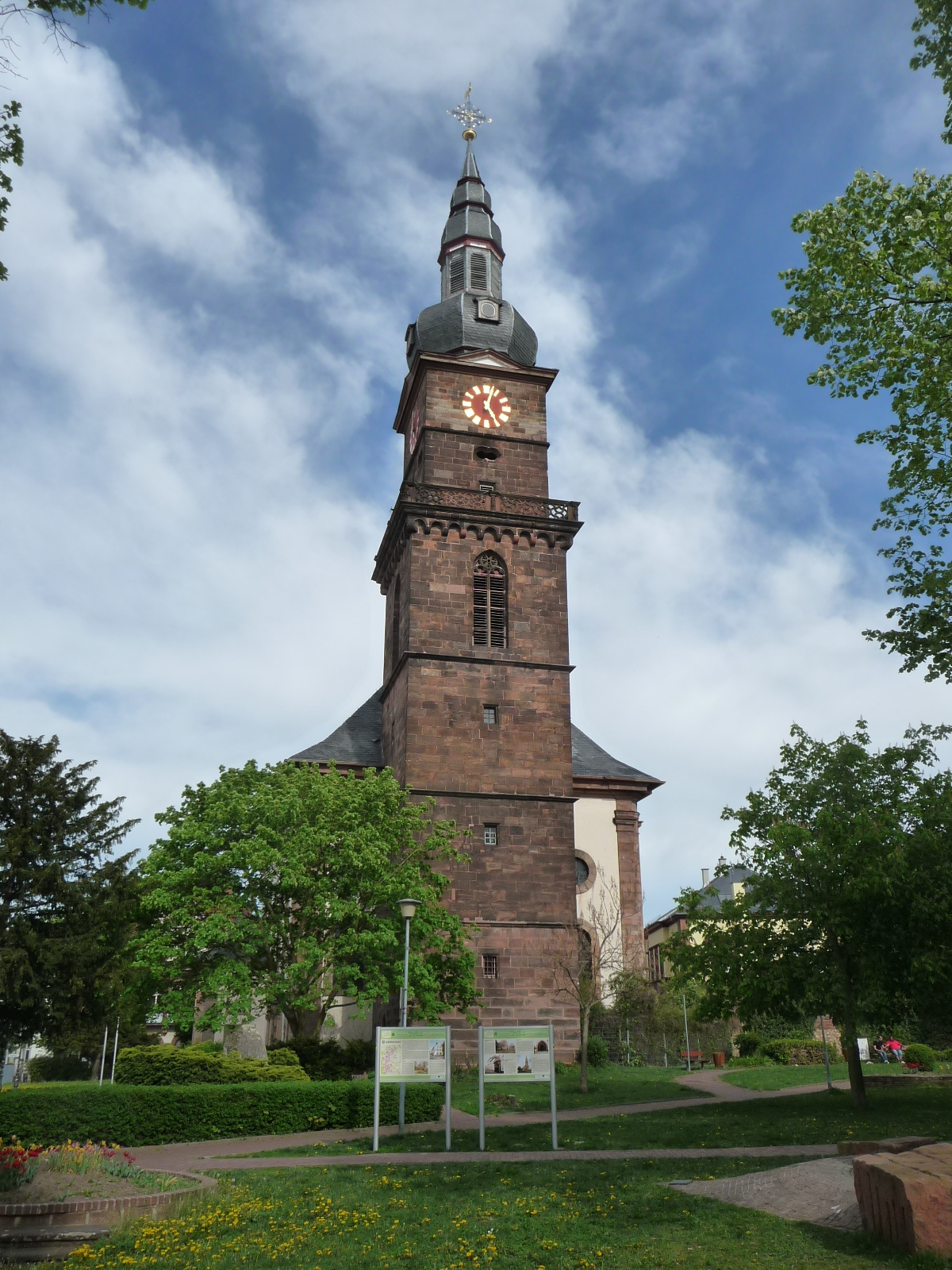
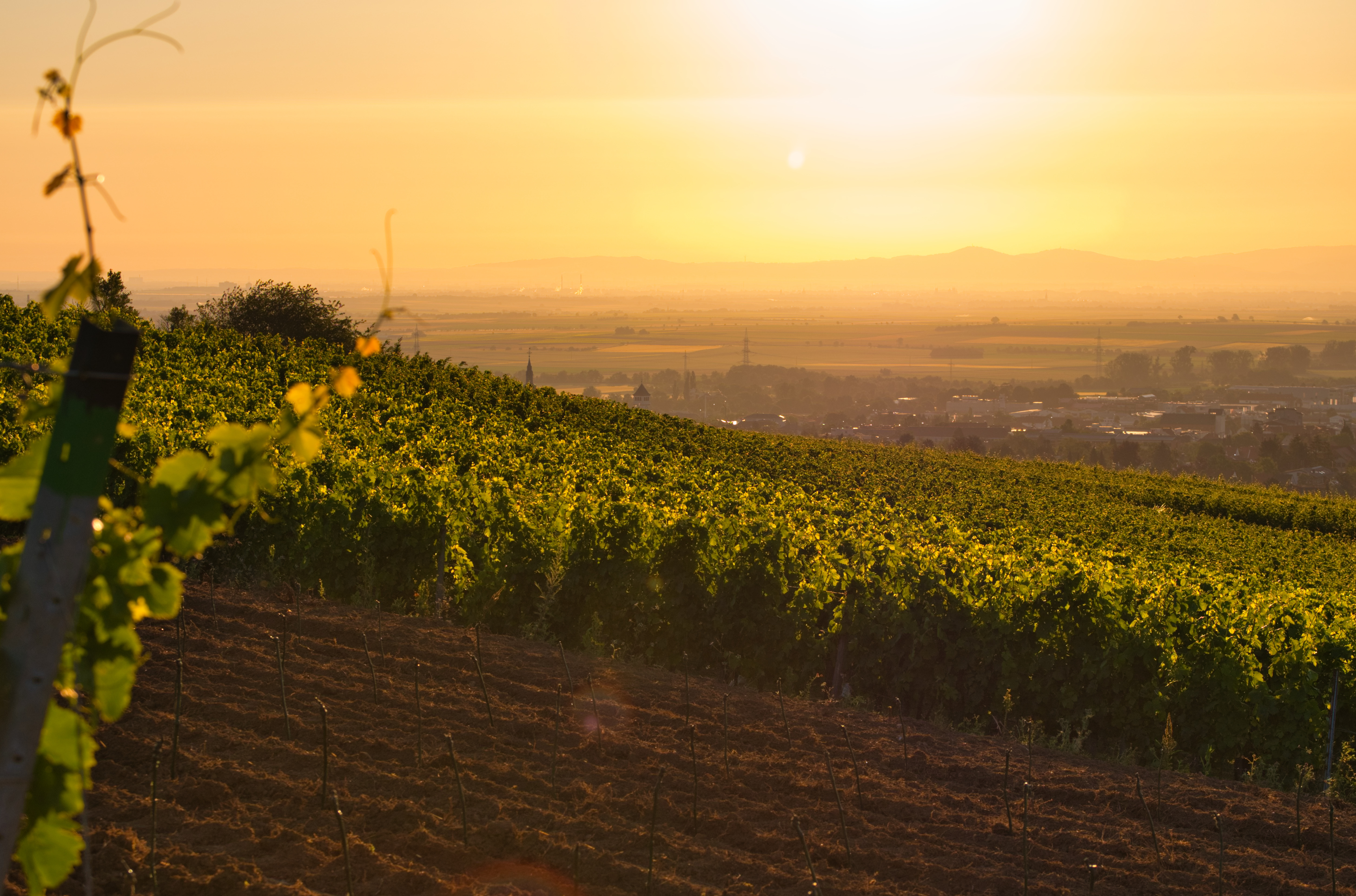
- pedestrianised street Leininger Oberhof prot. church vineyards near the town

- Coat of arms

- Location of Grünstadt within Bad Dürkheim district
- Interactive map of Grünstadt
- Location within Germany Location within Rhineland-Palatinate
- Coordinates: 49°34′09″N 08°10′05″E
- Country: Germany
- State: Rhineland-Palatinate
- District: Bad Dürkheim
- Subdivisions: 3

Government
  - Mayor (2017–25): Klaus Wagner (CDU)

Area
  - Total: 18.09 km^{2} (6.98 sq mi)
- Elevation: 161 m (528 ft)

Population (2025-12-31)
  - Total: 14,379
  - Density: 794.9/km^{2} (2,059/sq mi)
- Time zone: UTC+01:00 (CET)
  - Summer (DST): UTC+02:00 (CEST)
- Postal codes: 67269
- Dialling codes: 06359
- Vehicle registration: DÜW
- Website: www.stadt-gruenstadt.de

Grünstadt (German pronunciation: [ˈɡʁʏnˌʃtat]; Palatine German: Grinnschdadt) is a town in the Bad Dürkheim district in Rhineland-Palatinate, Germany with roughly 13,200 inhabitants. It does not belong to any Verbandsgemeinde – a kind of collective municipality – but is nonetheless the administrative seat of the Verbandsgemeinde of Leiningerland.

== Geography ==
=== Location ===
The town lies in the Leiningerland (the lands once held by the Counts of Leiningen) on the northern border of the Palatinate Forest about 10 km north of Bad Dürkheim, 15 km southwest of Worms and 20 km northwest of Ludwigshafen at the point where the German Wine Route crosses the Autobahn A 6. Grünstadt belongs to the “Unterhaardt” a landscape with submediterranean character as the geographer Christophe Neff wrote in his paysages blog. The town's landmark mountain is the so-called Grünstadter Berg.

=== Climate ===
Yearly precipitation in Grünstadt amounts to 529 mm, which is very low, falling into the lowest tenth of the precipitation chart for all Germany. Only at 7% of the German Weather Service's weather stations are even lower figures recorded. The driest month is February. The most rainfall comes in June. In that month, precipitation is 1.7 times what it is in February. Precipitation hardly varies throughout the year, however. At 15% of the weather stations, lower seasonal swings are recorded.

=== Constituent communities ===
Besides the main town of Grünstadt itself, which has some 10,000 inhabitants, there are two outlying centres within town limits, the Ortsteile of Asselheim (about 1,300 inhabitants) and Sausenheim (about 2,300 inhabitants).

== History ==
=== Early history until first documentary mention ===
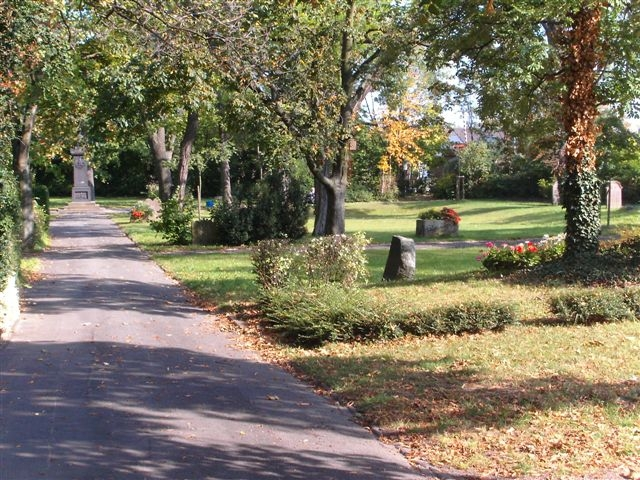
Peterspark Grünstadt, one of the town's “seeds”. From Roman times the dead were buried here, and here also stood the oldest church

The Grünstadt area is an ancient centre of culture. Within the town's modern limits, hunters from the Middle Stone Age, about 5000 BC, left their traces, as did farmers from the New Stone Age about 2000 BC. From the Bronze Age (1500-750 BC), Hallstatt times (700-450 BC) and La Tène times (450 BC – 1) come both remnants of settlements and archaeological finds.

In Roman times until AD 450 there were three inhabited centres, one of which was near today's Peterspark. This is one of Grünstadt's “seeds”, and it was also settled in the Merovingian and Frankish periods. It was here that the Romans buried their dead, the Christian Franks later taking over. There were quite likely a Roman burgus (a Latin word borrowed from the Germanic whose root also yields the German Burg ["castle"] and the English borough [originally "fortified town"]; it was a kind of small, towerlike fortification) and a temple complex that later became a church. Also here, about 800, the Alsatian Weißenburg Monastery (which lay in what is now Wissembourg, France) owned a church consecrated to Saint Peter with a parish estate – the latter of which gives a clue as to the town's importance – a lordly estate with great outbuildings and 14 farms.

At roughly the same time, there still stood a southern centre in the area around the Martinskirche (Saint Martin's Church) that belonged to the Glandern (or Lungenfeld) Monastery near Metz, and it is believed that there was a further settlement between the two. Grünstadt at first developed gradually from these three centres, one of which – apparently the southernmost – went back to a Frankish clan chief by the name of “Grimdeo” or “Grindeo”. Although the first syllable in the town's name – grün – happens to be the German word for “green”, modern linguistic research has unambiguously shown that the name does not derive from this root at all. The green municipal coat of arms introduced in the 19th century and the town colours, green and white, that were derived from it in 1928 therefore lack any historical basis.

=== 875 to 1500 ===
Grünstadt – or rather the southern settlement around Saint Martin's – had its first documentary mention on 21 November 875, when King Louis the German restored this estate to the Glandern Monastery near Metz. The place was already called Grinstat in this document, and the ownership rights already went back further, as they were only being restored. This settlement, therefore, was considerably older than that 875 document, which had nothing to say about the estate's buildings. It is assumed to have been a monastery estate with a small church, out of which grew first a Benedictine priory which was newly built several times, and then today's Protestant Saint Martin's Church, with the burial place of the House of Leiningen-Westerburg.

At roughly the same time, about 900, the northern settlement belonging to the Weißenburg Monastery (near today's Peterspark) was recorded in that institution's directory of holdings, even describing it in depth, with the holdings already mentioned (church, parish estate, manor house and many buildings), which point to an already great age for the village even then. The settlement later vanished or perhaps moved to the south to join the other two. Saint Peter's Church (Peterskirche) and its graveyard, whose beginnings could well go back to Roman times, were nevertheless kept on into the 19th century as a religious centre and necropolis, even though they lay far outside the later town of Grünstadt. In 1819, the church, which was more than 1,000 years old, was torn down, and the ancient patronage "St. Peter" then passed to the Capuchin church (now the Catholic parish church). The graveyard was closed only in 1874 and converted into today's Peterspark.

In 1155, Grünstadt was named in a document from Emperor Friedrich I Barbarossa in which he donated the holdings there to the Ramsen Monastery. In 1218, Pope Honorius III confirmed the Glandern Monastery's ownership of Saint Martin's Church in Grünstadt. In 1245, Pope Innocent IV certified the Höningen Monastery's holdings in Grünstadt. About 1300, the Weißenburg Monastery enfeoffed the Counts of Leiningen with its holdings in Grünstadt.

=== 1500 to 1700 ===
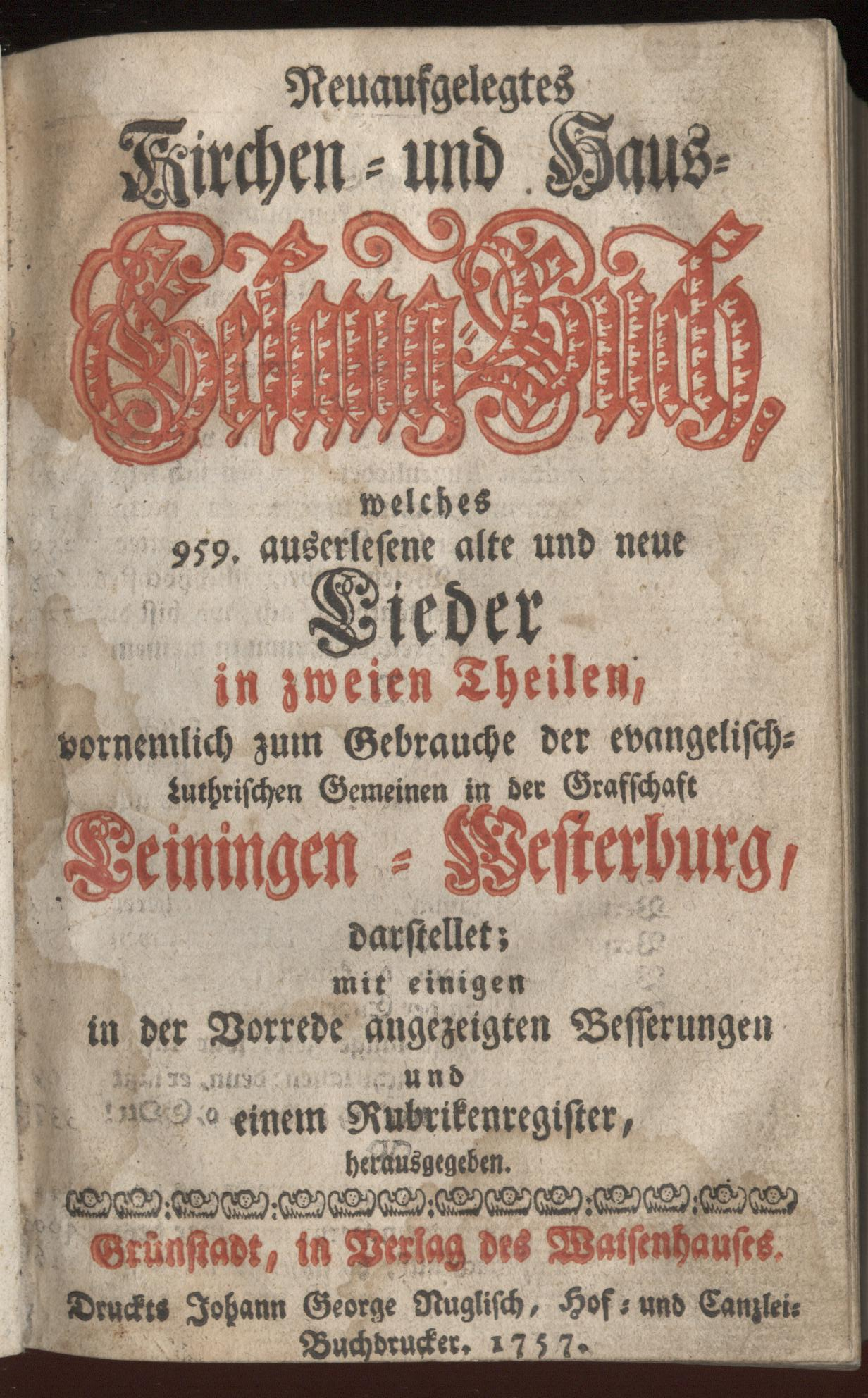
Lutheran songbook, Grünstadt 1757

From 1481 to 1505, Grünstadt belonged to the Palatinate, and then once again to the Leiningens, who in 1549 were also enfeoffed with the Glandern Monastery's holdings there (the southern part around Saint Martin's). It was not until 1735 that the Leiningens managed to acquire this property formerly belonging to the Glandern or Lungenfeld Monastery as their own.

In 1556, Emperor Karl V granted the municipality market rights, raising it from village to market town. The year before this one, Count Philipp I of Leiningen had introduced the obligatory practice of the Lutheran faith in his county and forbidden the other Christian denominations, namely Roman Catholicism and Reformed.

In 1573, Henry III of France, then King of Poland, spent the night in Grünstadt.

In 1596 and 1597, the Plague raged in Grünstadt, killing more than 250 inhabitants in a short time.

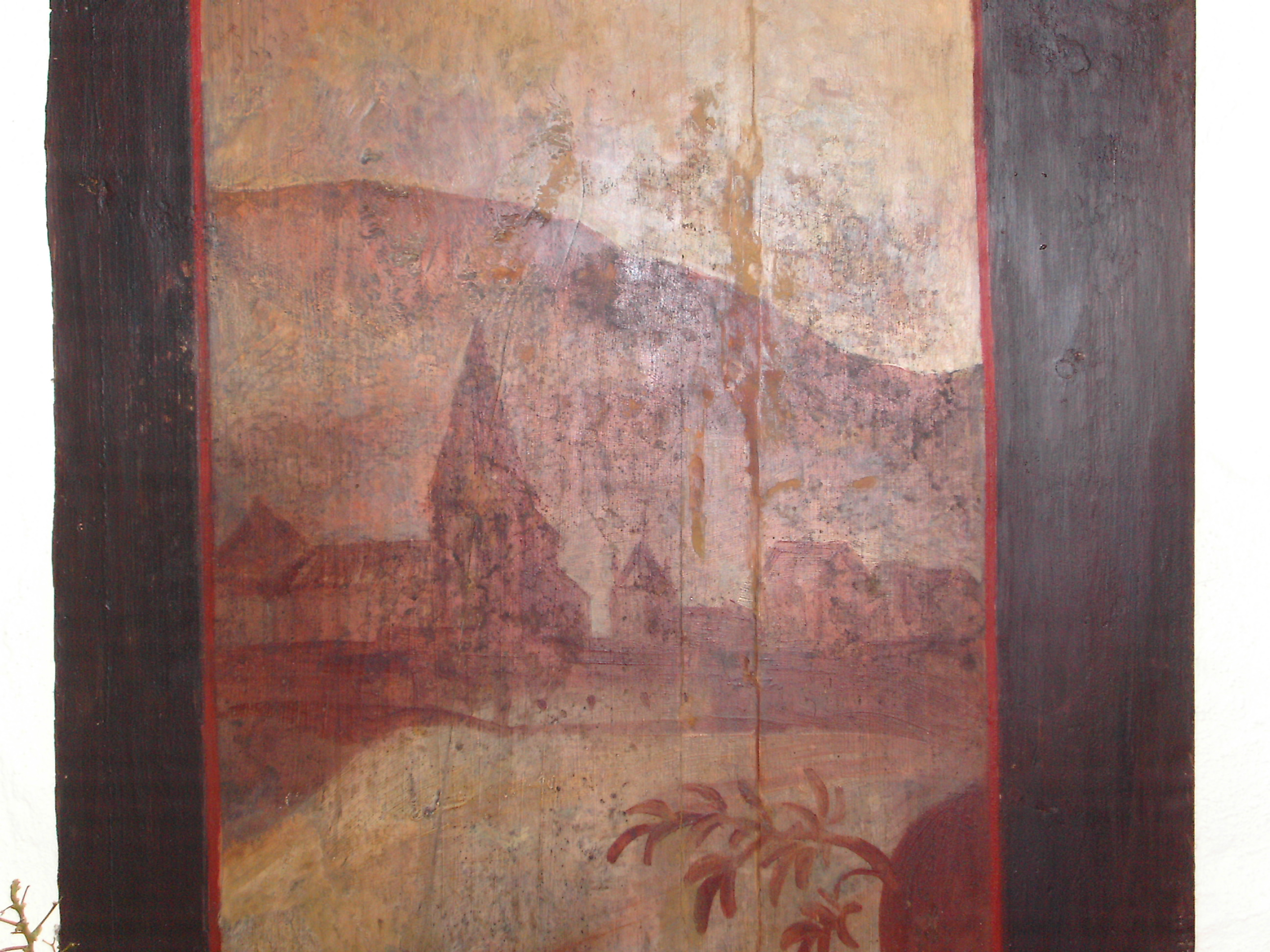
Grünstadt about 1680, stylized representation in wood, in one of the town's old houses. In the background the Grünstadter Berg (mountain), at left Saint Martin's Church, at right the smaller Saint Peter's Church, in the foreground a bit of the town wall.

Beginning in 1610, the Counts were having coins struck in Grünstadt, and established a mint.

In the time of the Thirty Years' War, the town was spared any major destruction; however, the Plague once again beset the townsfolk between 1625 and 1629. Many of them died or left the area. For a time, Spanish soldiers were quartered in Grünstadt.

In 1673, Count Ludwig Eberhardt of Leiningen converted to the Catholic faith and thereafter granted Catholics tolerance in his county. He had the Capuchins come there, who soon founded a monastery from which arose today's Catholic parish church and the monastery building.

In 1689, in the Nine Years' War (known in Germany as the Pfälzischer Erbfolgekrieg, or War of the Palatine Succession), the French burnt the town down, which is why there are only a few traces of pre-Baroque architecture in town.

It was only in 1689 that the long overdue reform to the Gregorian Calendar was implemented in Grünstadt and the rest of the county, heretofore having been boycotted for religious reasons because it was instituted by Pope Gregory XIII.

=== 1700 to 1800 ===
Since both the family castles of Altleiningen and Neuleiningen had also been burnt down, the two comital lines both settled in Grünstadt beginning in 1700, made it a common residence town and took turns ruling. The Altleiningers had the old Glandern monasterial estate near Saint Martin's Church expanded into a palatial residence and called it Schloß Unterhof, while the Neuleiningers built the stately Baroque Schloß Oberhof not far away. For about 100 years, Grünstadt remained the capital of the county of Leiningen-Westerburg.

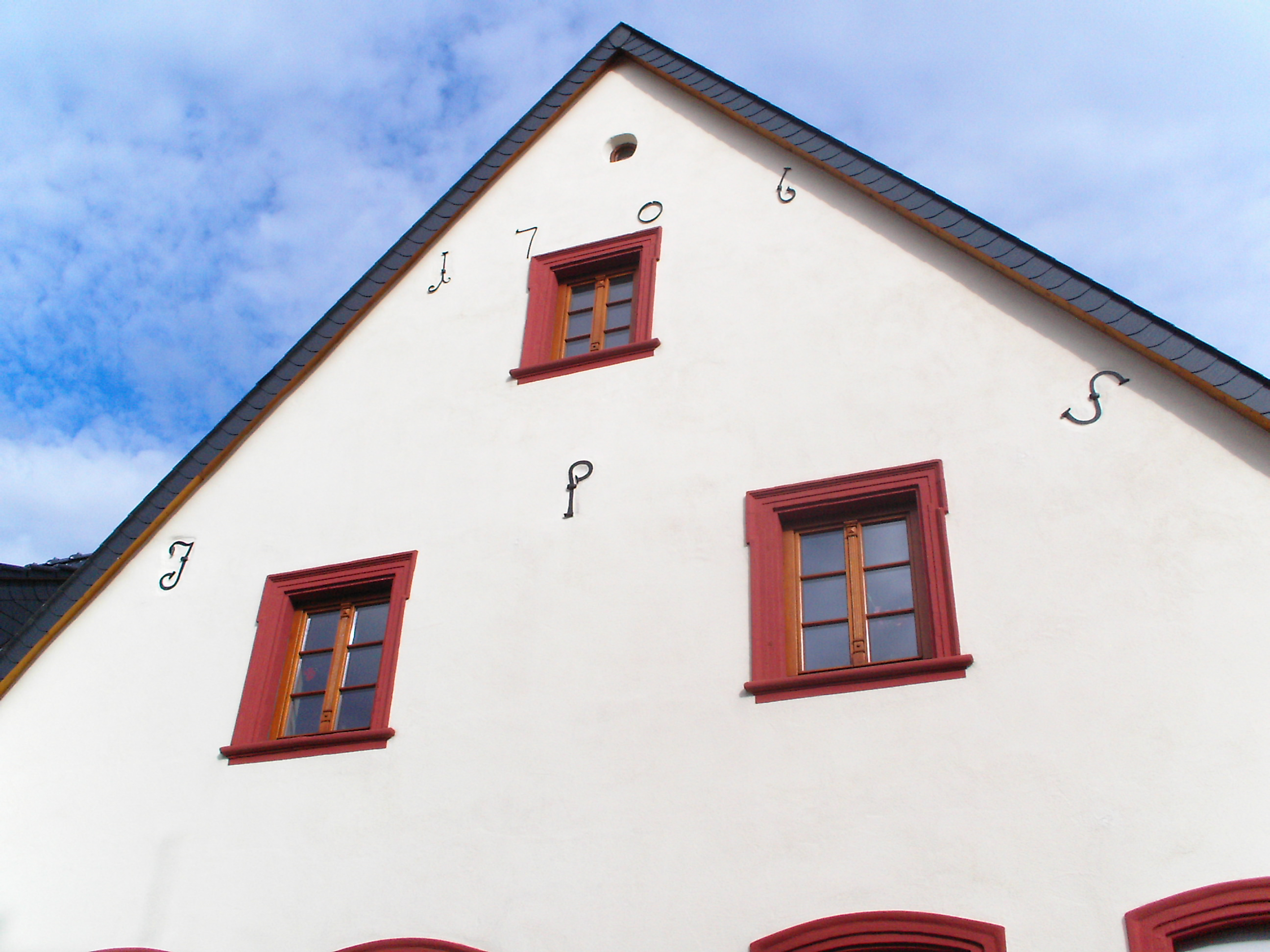
Baroque house of Oberschultheiß Johann Peter Schwartz, with his initials.

In 1726, the first Reformed church service was held in Grünstadt. In the time that followed, the Reformed Church's followers were subjected to great oppression, mainly by the Lutheran clergy. They were not allowed to build their own church, and they were even forbidden to bury their dead at the local graveyard. They were instead buried in a barn, where the community also met for its services. The Reformed Schultheiß and master tanner Johann Peter Schwartz, especially, put himself forth as the group's spokesman to defend against this treatment. He wrote to royalty (for instance, King Frederick II of Prussia) and eventually forced formal tolerance of the Reformed Church in the county. Not far from his house (which still bears the initials “JPS” today), on the same spot where their old barn had stood, the Reformed Church's followers built themselves their own church in 1740, which is now known as the Friedenskirche (“Church of Peace”).

In 1729, Count Georg Hermann at Leiningen-Westerburg-Altleiningen founded a Latin school in Grünstadt, as a successor institution to the monastery school at Höningen (nowadays an outlying centre of Altleiningen). From this arose first a Progymnasium and then today's Leininger-Gymnasium.

In the War of the First Coalition, there was fighting in the area around Grünstadt between 1793 and 1795 with the occupiers changing among the Austrians, the French and the Prussians. In 1794, the man who would later become Field Marshal von Blücher, but who at this time was a colonel in the Prussian Red Hussars, procured quarters in the town. According to local lore, he rode his horse up the outdoor stairway that then stood at the (now former) town hall and made a speech to the townsfolk.

=== 1800 to 1900 ===
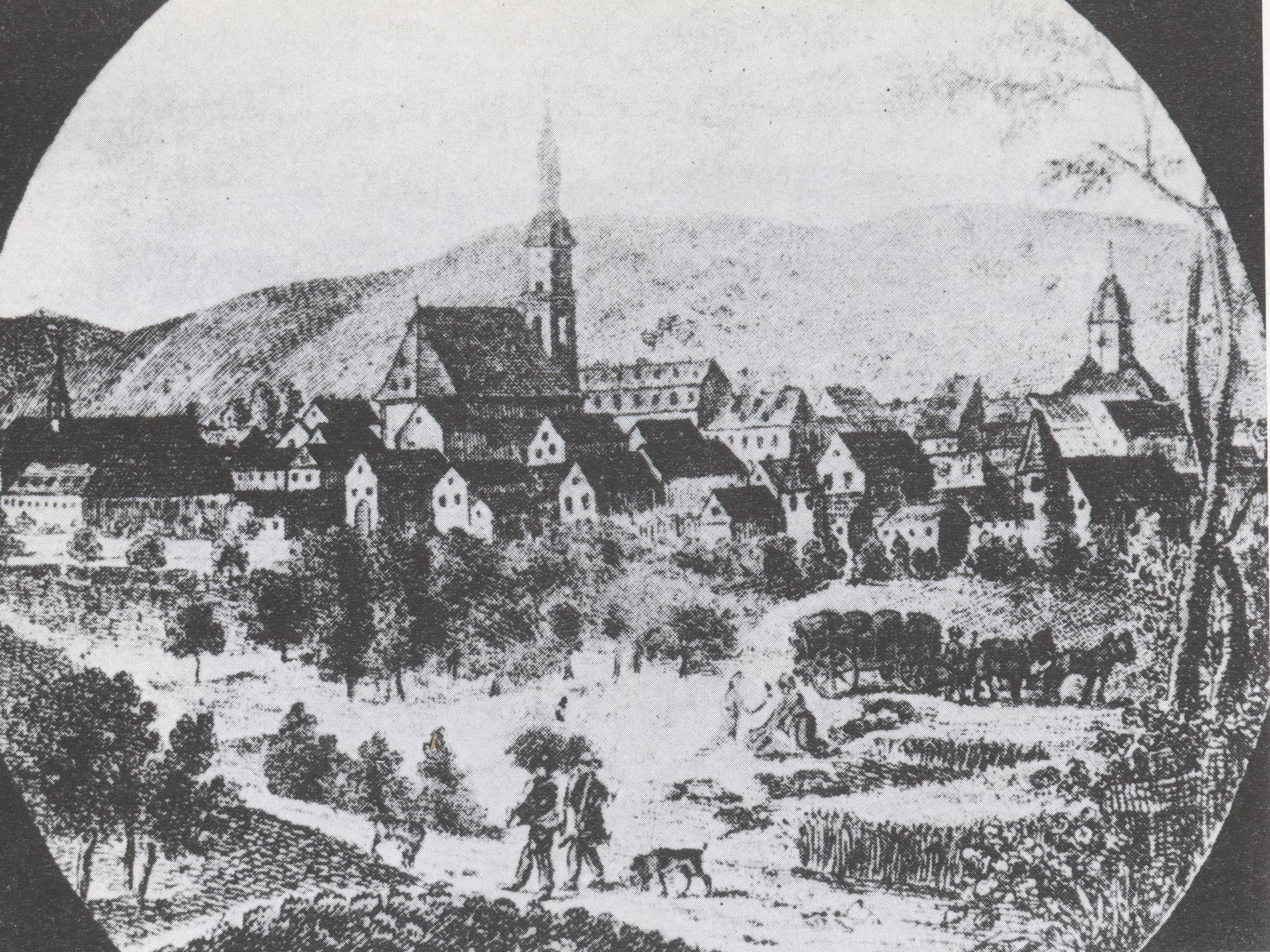
Grünstadt about 1800, contemporary copper engraving

In 1797, with the Treaty of Campo Formio – itself permanently confirmed by the Treaty of Lunéville (1801) – Grünstadt passed as a cantonal seat to the French Department of Mont-Tonnerre (or Donnersberg in German), whose seat of government was in Mainz. Grünstadt remained French until 1815.

After Napoleon's downfall and in accordance with the treaty agreements of the Congress of Vienna, Grünstadt passed in 1816 to the Kingdom of Bavaria. It remained Bavarian for exactly 130 years, until the new state of Rhineland-Palatinate was founded in 1946.

On 14 June 1829, King Ludwig I of Bavaria and his consort Queen Therese visited the town as part of their tour of the Palatinate. The king attended a High Mass at the Capuchin church and was ceremoniously welcomed by Father Bernhard Würschmitt.

On 14 June 1849 – twenty years to the day later – Prince William of Prussia, who would later be Wilhelm I, German Emperor, rode in pursuit of the irregular, revolutionary partisans (Freischärler) coming from Kirchheimbolanden with his staff through what is now called Jakobstraße (street) and Hauptstraße. At the Stadthaus (now known as the Old Town Hall) he made a stop and an officer from his entourage spoke from the outdoor stairway to the townsfolk on the topic of “Loyalty towards Prince and Fatherland”, whereafter the military detachment pushed on towards the south.

In 1873, Grünstadt acquired a rail link on the Bad Dürkheim - Monsheim railway with its own station.

=== 1900 to present ===
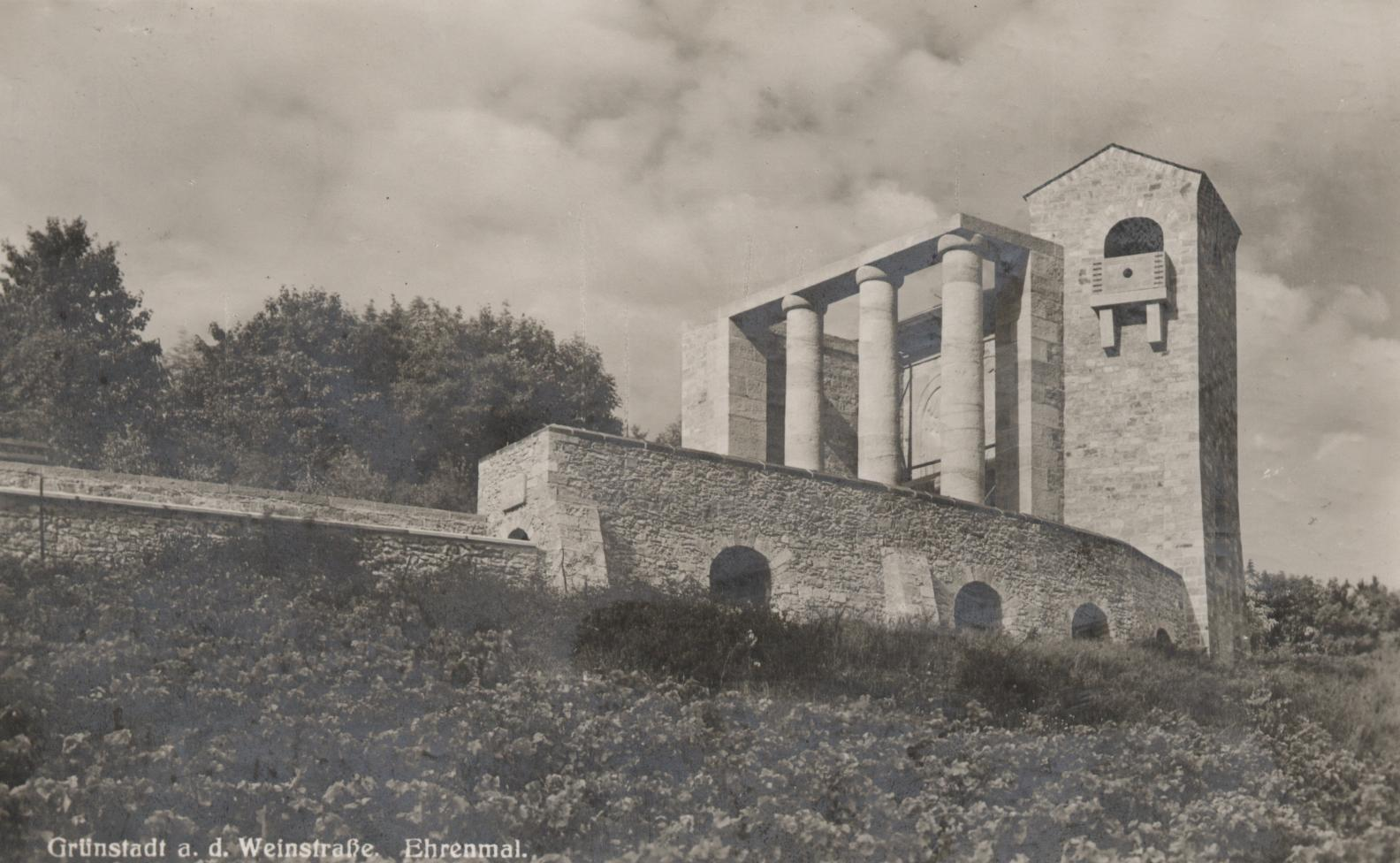
War memorial for the fallen of the First World War on the Grünstadter Berg

In the First World War (1914–1918), 164 inhabitants of Grünstadt fell, in whose memory in 1937 a templelike memorial was built in a prominent spot on the Grünstadter Berg.

In the Second World War (1939–1945), Grünstadt was repeatedly the target of air raids to which, among others, Saint Martin's Church fell victim. As a result of wartime events, 360 people lost their lives, soldiers and civilian victims of bombings. As well, the town's very old and important Jewish community was swept away in this time by deportation and emigration, although the Baroque synagogue and the Jewish graveyard east of town have been preserved.

On 20 March 1945, American troops occupied the town area; the French military followed them on 7 July 1945.

In the wake of the dissolution of the Frankenthal district, after having belonged to the same district for more than 150 years, Grünstadt passed in 1969 to the new district of Bad Dürkheim; the vehicle licence prefix changed from “FT” to “DÜW”. On 7 June 1969, the formerly autonomous localities of Asselheim and Sausenheim were amalgamated with the town.

== Religion ==
=== History of Grünstadt’s Jewish community ===
Grünstadt was once one of the most important Jewish communities in the Palatinate. In 1827, more than ten percent of the town's population was Jewish. From 1608 to 1933, the Jewish community's history can be traced in an unbroken line. The persecution of Jews by the Nazi régime sealed the community's fate. It simply ceased to exist.

=== Today ===
In 2007, 44.4% of the inhabitants were Evangelical and 25.5% Catholic. The rest belonged to other faiths or adhered to none.

== Politics ==
=== Town council ===
The council is made up of 28 honorary council members, who were elected at the municipal election held on 7 June 2009, and the full-time mayor as chairman.

The municipal election held on 7 June 2009 yielded the following results:

Year	SPD	CDU	FDP	GRÜNE	FWG	Total
2009	8	10	2	2	6	28 seats
2004	10	11	2	2	3	28 seats

=== Mayors ===
From 2002 to 2009, the directly elected mayor was Hans Jäger (SPD). Since 1 January 2010, however, Klaus Wagner (CDU) has been the new Mayor of Grünstadt.

=== Coat of arms ===
The German blazon reads: In Grün ein rotbewehrter silberner Adler, bewinkelt von vier gleichschenkligen goldenen Kreuzchen.

The town's arms might in English heraldic language be described thus: Vert an eagle displayed argent armed and langued gules among four Greek crosses in fess Or, two in chief, and two in base.

The arms were approved in 1890 by the Bavarian prince regent Luitpold and go back to a court seal from 1456.

The eagle is taken from the arms borne by the Counts of Leiningen, but the reason for the crosses’ inclusion as a charge is less clear. They might refer to the Weißenburg Monastery, which was also a landlord in the town. The tincture vert (green) is canting for the town's name, Grünstadt, which means “Greentown”, although research has shown that the name does not derive from this German word.

=== Town partnerships ===
Grünstadt fosters partnerships with the following places:

- (Germany) Hermsdorf, Saale-Holzland-Kreis, Thuringia
- (United States) Greenville, Ohio, USA
- Carrières-sur-Seine, Yvelines, France
- (United States) Bonita Springs, Florida, USA
- (Germany) Westerburg, Westerwaldkreis, Rhineland-Palatinate
- (Germany) Peine, Peine, Lower Saxony (friendship agreement with outlying centre of Asselheim)

== Culture and sightseeing ==
=== Regular events ===
In Grünstadt, the tradition of the Stabausstecken has been kept, or has at least been given new life. This is a festival, traditionally held in early March, in which winter is burnt in effigy, an event known as the Winterverbrennung (“Winter Burning”).

== Economy and infrastructure ==
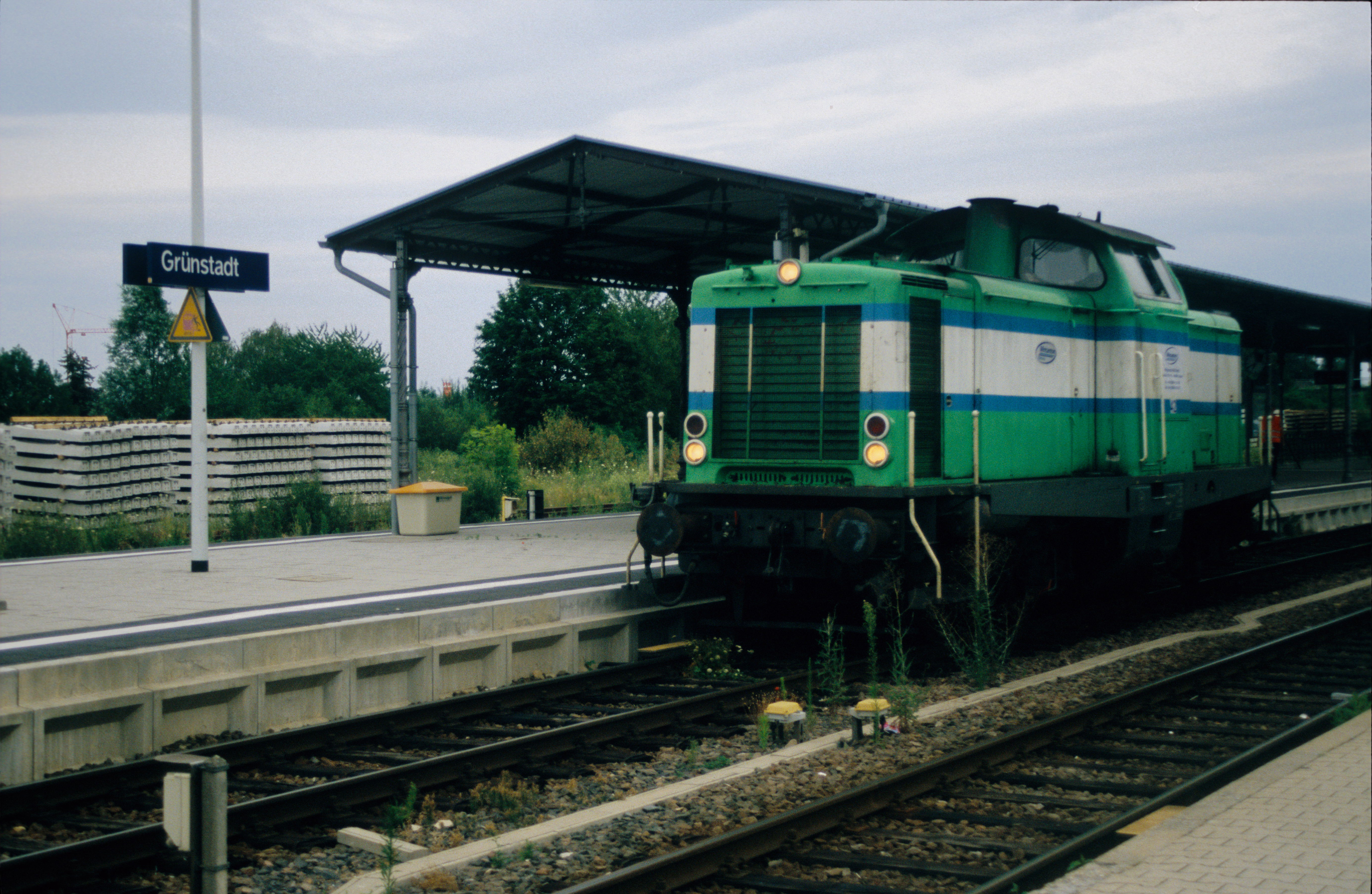
Locomotive 42 of the Wincanton Rail at Grünstadt railway station, July 2007)

=== Transport ===
Thanks to the A 6 motorway (from Saarbrücken to Mannheim), Grünstadt is well linked not only to the national motorway network in Germany, but also to France and the Czech Republic. Grünstadt station also lies on the Palatine Northern Railway, which in parts runs alongside the German Wine Route in the southerly direction to Neustadt an der Weinstraße. Furthermore, the re-opened Eis Valley Railway runs into the Palatinate Forest to the Eiswoog (a reservoir and hiking destination) near Ramsen. Formerly this line reached all the way to Enkenbach. The Lower Eis Valley Railway also branches off the Palatine Northern Railway in Grünstadt.

=== Authorities ===
Besides its own town administration, Grünstadt harbours the administration of the Verbandsgemeinde of Leiningerland, even though the town itself is in neither this nor any other Verbandsgemeinde.

=== Courts ===
Grünstadt has at its disposal an Amtsgericht that belongs to the state court region (Landgerichtsbezirk) of Frankenthal and the high state court region (Oberlandesgerichtsbezirk) of Zweibrücken.

=== Hospital ===
In the town is found a 200-bed hospital with an adjoining day clinic (12 places). The sponsor is the Bad Dürkheim district.

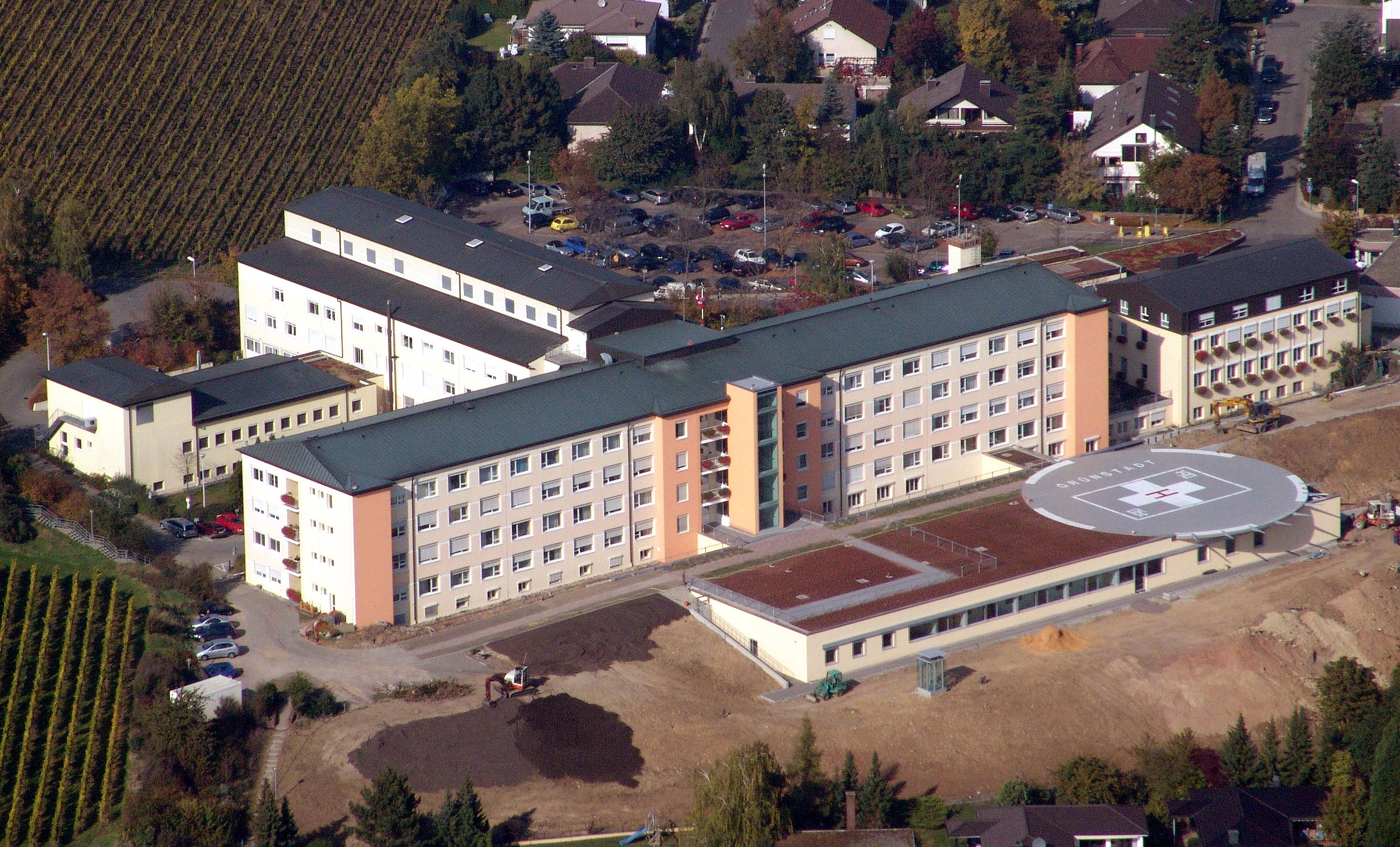
Grünstadt Hospital

=== Education ===
Besides three primary schools, a Hauptschule, and a Realschule, there is the Leininger Gymnasium, which is steeped in tradition and rooted in the old Höningen Latin School.

== Sundry ==
Grünstadt is known for its AAFES bakery. In Grünstadt, it is called the depot (AAFES Depot Grünstadt).

== Notable people ==
=== Sons and daughters of the town ===
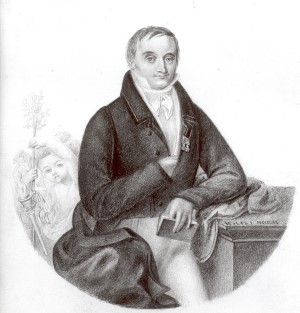
Andreas van Recum

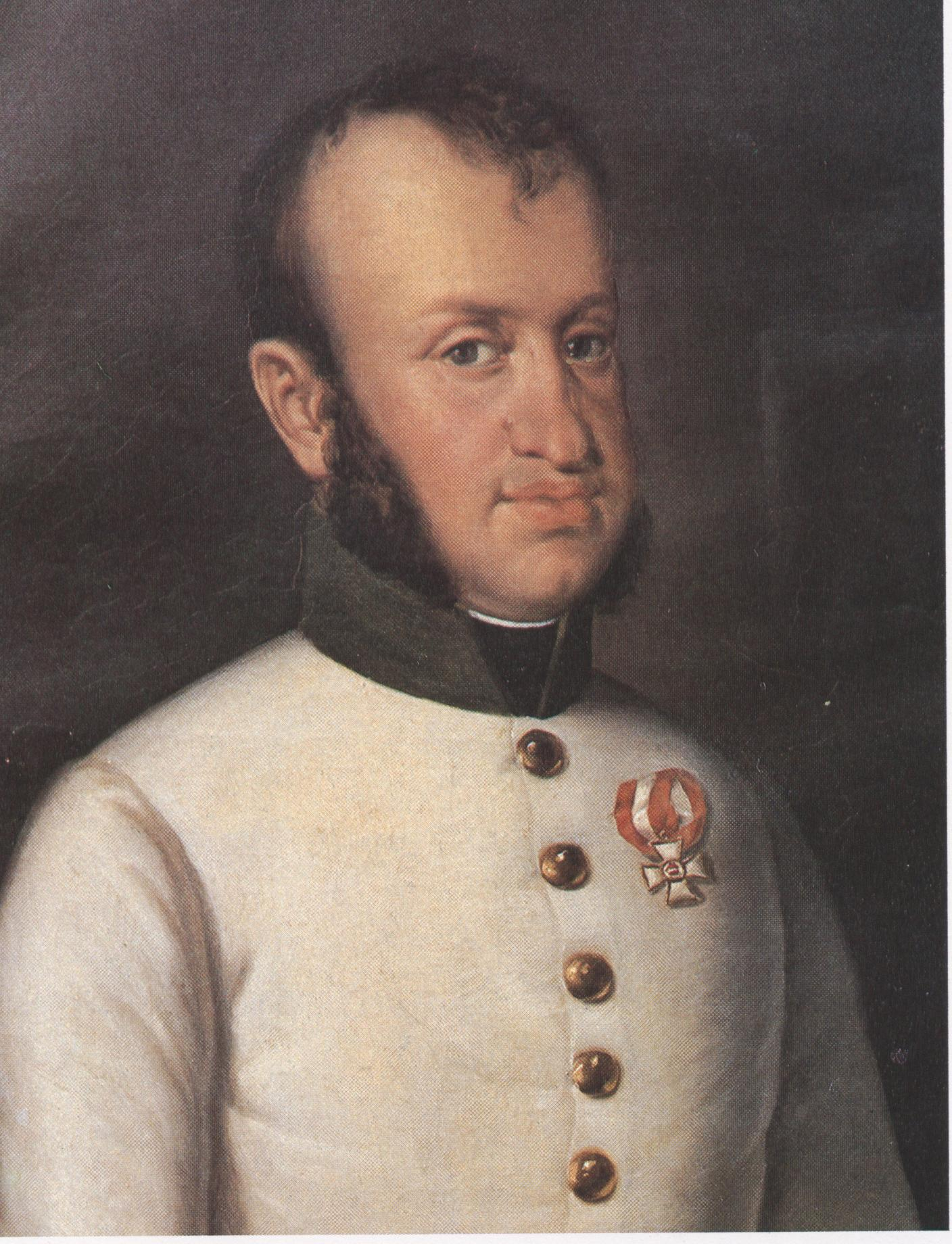
Christian Ludwig zu Leiningen-Westerburg-Neuleiningen

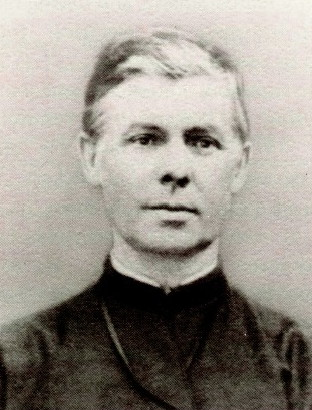
Karl Heinrich Heichemer

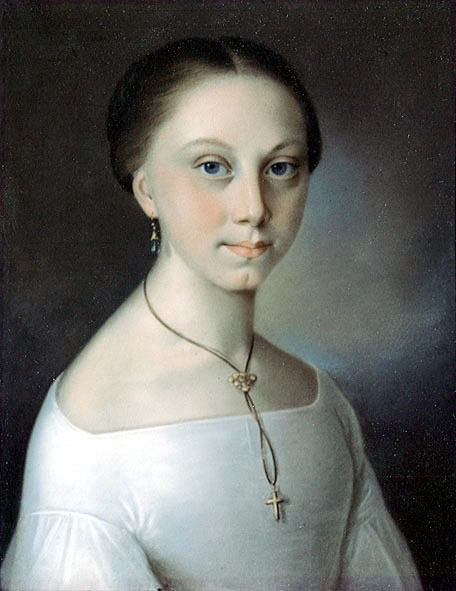
Franziska Riotte

=== 19th century ===
- Jacob Frankel (1808–1887), the first Jewish military chaplain in the United States
- Franz Umbscheiden (1825–1874), German revolutionary and journalist
- Adolf Stern (1849–1907), chess player

=== 20th century ===
- Erwin Lehn (1919–2010), German pianist and Orchestra leader (SWR's Südfunk-Tanzorchester)
- Ludwig Wilding (born 1927), painter and object artist
- Wolfgang Heinz (born 1938), politician (FDP)
- Norbert Schindler (born 1949), politician (CDU)
- Marco Haber (born 1971), footballer
- Silvio Adzic (born 1980), footballer

=== Notable people associated with the town ===
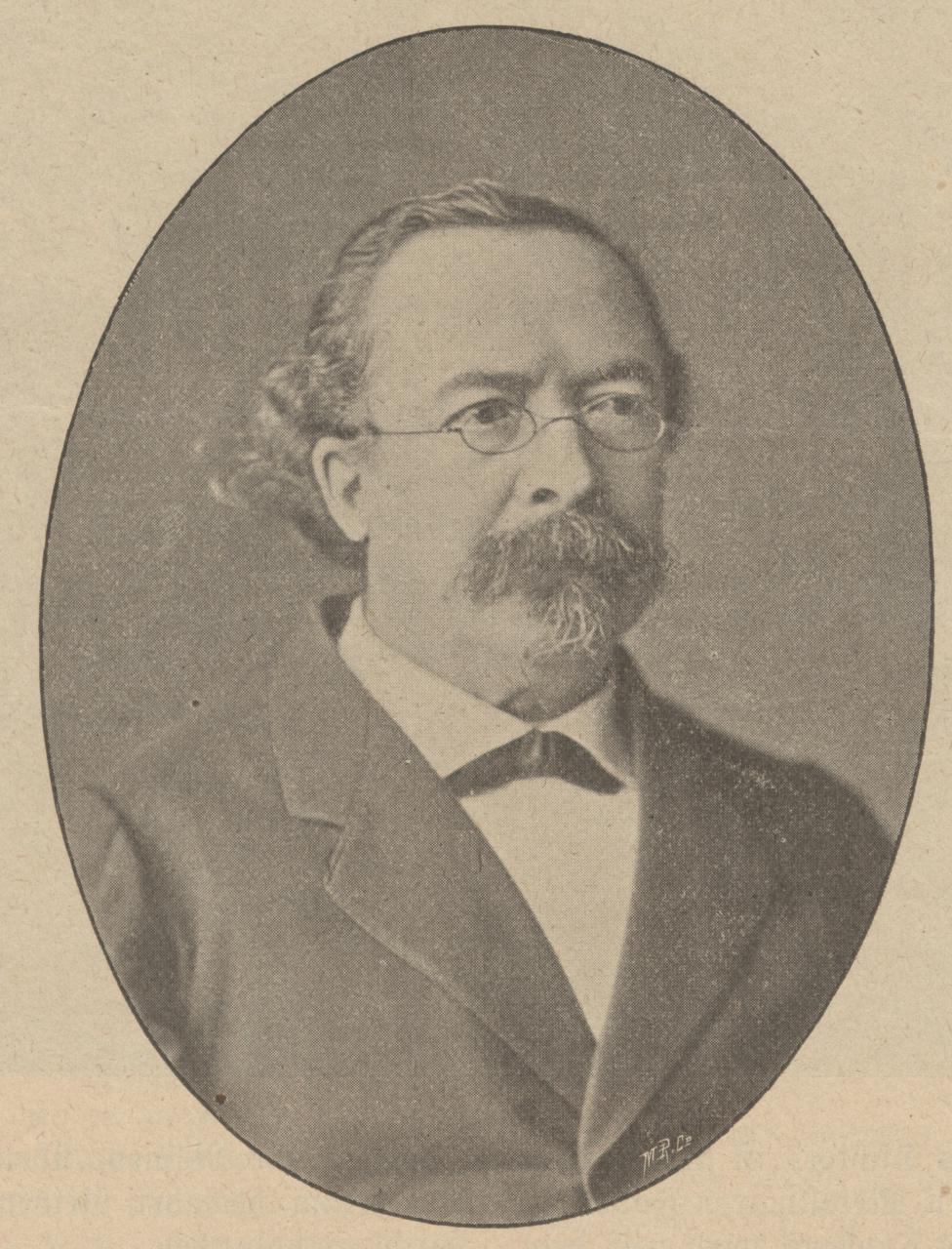
Ferdinand Gottfried von Herder

- Friedrich Christian Laukhard, (1757–1822), writer, attended the Leininger-Gymnasium.
- Christophe Neff, forest fire expert and geographer, lives in Grünstadt.
- Boris Brejcha, DJ and music producer, lives in Grünstadt.
- Ludwig Kratzer, (1913-2001), WWII prisoner of war

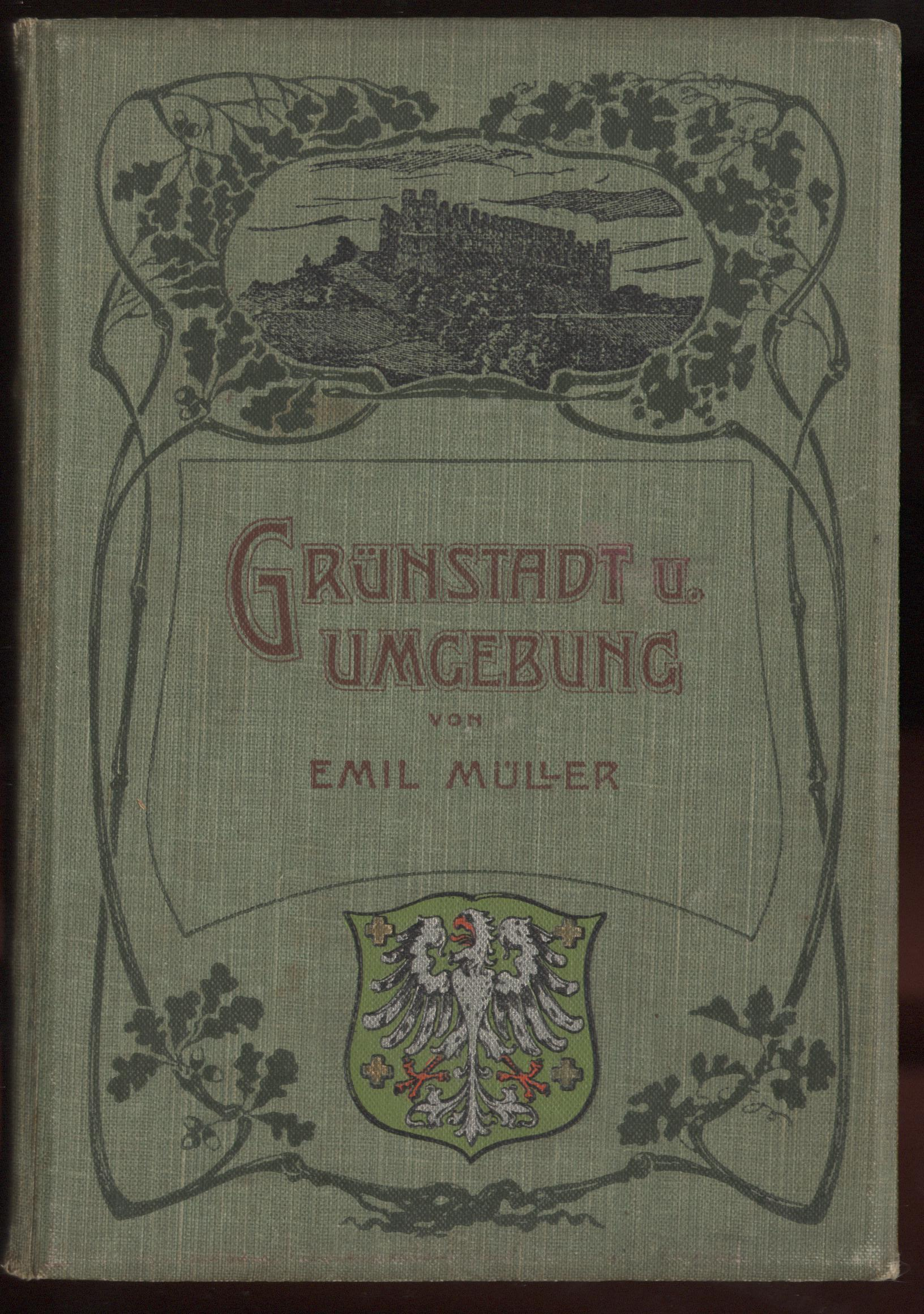
First book on Grünstadt local history, Emil Müller, 1904
