= Hine =

Other names
- Variant forms: Hines, Hyne, Hynes, Hind, Ion, Hayne

Hine is a surname deriving from Middle English.

== Etymology ==
According to the Oxford Dictionary of Family Names in Britain and Ireland, the modern name Hine and its variants derive from the Middle English word hine (with the addition of the genitive -s case ending in forms like Hines, implying that the name-bearer was the child of a father called Hine, or addition of -s on the analogy of such names). This occupational name derives from Old English hīne ('household servant, farm labourer'), but in the Middle English period could also mean 'farm manager' and also be used of high-status people serving in a lordly household.

== Distribution ==
Around 2011, there were 2899 bearers of the surname Hine in Great Britain and 21 in Ireland. In 1881, there were 2301 bearers of the name in Great Britain, concentrated in Devon.

== People ==
Hine may refer to:

- Charles DeLano Hine (1867–1927), American civil engineer
- Deirdre Hine (born 1937), Welsh medical doctor
- Edward Hine (1825–1891), proponent of British Israelism in the 19th century
- George Thomas Hine, son of Thomas Chambers Hine, architect
- Lemon G. Hine (1832–1914), American politician and lawyer from Washington, D.C.
- Lewis Hine (1874–1940), American sociologist
- Mark Hine (1964–2025), English footballer
- Michele Hine, New Zealand actor
- Nicholas Hine, a character in the Sharpe novels of Bernard Cornwell
- Nick Hine (born 1966), British Royal Navy officer
- Milton B. Hine (1828–1881), American politician
- Reginald Hine (1883–1949), solicitor and historian
- Robert V. Hine (1921–2015), American historian
- Rupert Hine (1947–2020), English record producer and musician
- Sonny Hine (1931–2000), American Hall of Fame Thoroughbred horse trainer
- Thomas Hine & Co., a manufacturer of cognac
- Thomas Chambers Hine (1813-1899), architect

== See also ==
- Hine E Hine, a Māori song
- Hine-nui-te-pō, a mythical Māori woman
- Ngāti Hine, a Māori tribe
- Hines (disambiguation)
- Hine (TV series), 1971 British television series
