= Heini =

Heini is both a given name and a nickname, often short for Heinrich. It is mainly a masculine given name in German-speaking countries, but a feminine given name in Finland. However, in Wales, it is a both masculine and feminine given name, meaning 'healthy and spirited'. Currently, in Wales, it is more commonly recognised as a female given name. Notable people with the name include:

- Heini Adams (born 1980), South African rugby union player
- Enrico Bacher (1940–2021), Italian ice hockey player nicknamed "Heini"
- Heinrich Heini Becker (born 1935), Australian politician
- Heini Bock (born 1981), Namibian rugby union player
- Heini Brüggemann, German sprint canoeist
- Heini Dittmar (1911–1960), German glider pilot
- Heini Gruffudd (born 1946), Welsh author, winner of the 2013 Welsh-language Wales Book of the Year award
- Heini Halberstam (1927–2014), British mathematician
- Heini Hediger (1908–1992), Swiss biologist
- Heini Hemmi (born 1949), Swiss alpine skier
- Heinrich Heini Klopfer (1918–1968), German ski jumper and architect
- Heini Koivuniemi (born 1973), Finnish strongwoman competitor
- Heinrich Heini Lohrer (1918–2011), Swiss ice hockey player
- Heinrich Heini Meng (1902–?), Swiss ice hockey player
- Heini Müller, Swiss footballer
- Heinrich Heini Müller (footballer, born 1934), German footballer
- Heini Otto (born 1954), Dutch footballer
- Heini Salonen (born 1993), Finnish tennis player
- Heini Vatnsdal (born 1991), Faroese football player
- Heinrich Heini Walter (1927–2009), Swiss racing driver
- Heini Wathén (born 1955), Finnish female model

== See also ==
- Heinis, French automobile
- Heine (surname)
