= Jon Hynes =

American musician

- Origin: Little Rock, Arkansas, U.S.
- Genres: Classical music
- Occupation: Pianist

Jon Hynes is an American classical concert pianist.

== Biography ==
A native of Little Rock, Arkansas, Hynes is a graduate of the Eastman School of Music in Rochester, New York. His teachers included Vitaly Margulis and Natalya Antonova. Hynes spent two years at the Paris Conservatory in France before completing his doctoral degree from the Eastman School. He has performed around the world at venues such as St. Martin-in-the-Fields in London, the International Musicora Festival in Paris and the Gnessin School of Music in Moscow.

Hynes is a prize-winning pianist of several competitions, including the gold medal of the 1990 Nena Wideman Competition, the Eastman Concerto Competition, and the Young Keyboard Artists International Competition. He is a frequent adjudicator, lecturer, and clinician throughout the United States.
