= Steven Heine (psychologist) =

Canadian psychologist

Steven J. Heine is a Canadian professor of psychology at the University of British Columbia, Department of Psychology. He specialises in cultural psychology.

== Professional background ==
Heine's research specialty is social psychology, particularly cultural psychology with an emphasis on the differences between Western and East Asian cultures. He also has done research on the meaning maintenance model and genetic essentialism.

== Honors and awards ==
In 2003, Heine was awarded the Distinguished Scientist Early Career Award for Social Psychology, American Psychological Association. In 2011, he was honored with the Career Trajectory Award, Society of Experimental Social Psychology. In 2016, he was elected as a fellow into the Royal Society of Canada.

== Selected publications ==
=== Books ===
- Start Making Sense:How Existential Psychology Can Help Us Build Meaningful Lives in Absurd Times (New York:Basic Books, 2025, ISBN 9781541600812)

=== Journal articles ===
- Heine, Steven J.; Henrich, Joseph; Norenzayan, Ara (2010). "The weirdest people in the world?" (PDF). Behavioral and Brain Sciences. 33 (2–3): 61–83. doi:10.1017/S0140525X0999152X. hdl:11858/00-001M-0000-0013-26A1-6. PMID 20550733. S2CID 220918842.
