= Heinis =

French automobile (manufactured 1925-1930)

The Heinis was a French automobile manufactured in Neuilly from 1925 until 1930. It was the brainchild of one M. Heinis. The cars were offered with various engines, including an ohc 799 cc four, which was designed by Heinis himself. Other engine options included various proprietary 1100 cc, 1170 cc, 1690 cc, and 1947 cc units, and a 5000 cc Lycoming eight.
