= Hines, West Virginia =

- Unincorporated community
- Location within West Virginia Location within the United States
- Coordinates: 37°59′00″N 80°43′05″W
- Country: United States
- State: West Virginia
- County: Greenbrier
- Elevation: 2,411 ft (735 m)
- Time zone: UTC-5 (Eastern (EST))
  - Summer (DST): UTC-4 (EDT)
- Area codes: 304 & 681
- GNIS feature ID: 1540311

Hines is an unincorporated community in Greenbrier County, West Virginia, United States. Hines is located on U.S. Route 60, northwest of Rupert.

== Climate ==
The climate in this area has mild differences between highs and lows, and there is adequate rainfall year-round. According to the Köppen Climate Classification system, Hines has a marine west coast climate, abbreviated "Cfb" on climate maps.
