= Michael Himes =

American theologian and priest

- Occupation: Priest, Theologian, Professor

Father Michael Himes (May 12, 1947 – June 10, 2022) was a priest of the Roman Catholic Diocese of Brooklyn, New York. Himes was a theologian at Boston College in Chestnut Hill, Massachusetts. He served as professor and academic dean of the Seminary of Immaculate Conception on Long Island, New York, and as associate professor of theology at the University of Notre Dame.

== Education ==
Himes received his bachelor's degree at Cathedral College, located in Douglaston, New York, his masters at the Seminary of Immaculate Conception in Huntington, New York, and his doctorate in the history of Christianity at the University of Chicago. He was the recipient of four honorary degrees.

He was ordained to the priesthood May 27, 1972.

== Last lecture ==
Michael Himes gave a talk he called "Last Lecture" at BC on November 18, 2008, in the Yawkey Athletic Center at Boston College in Chestnut Hill, Massachusetts, just outside the city of Boston. This Last Lecture speech lasting 52 minutes long, given by Himes, talks about "all the important things in life." Over 1,000 students, faculty, and staffed attended what would become one of his more prominent and popular marks on philosophical, theological, and ecclesiological thought.

The speech marked the first in a series named for the talk given by Carnegie Mellon University professor Randy Pausch in September 2007, after Pausch was diagnosed with pancreatic cancer, from which he died in July 2008. The format encourages the speaker to discuss, in Himes's words, "the issues that matter most and have been truest in life."

== Publications and presentations ==
=== Before 2002 ===
- Fullness of Faith: The Public Significance of Theology with Kenneth Himes OFM (Paulist Press, 1993)
- Johann Sebastian Drey: A Brief Introduction to the Study of Theology (translation and introduction)
- Associate editor, The Harper Encyclopedia of Catholicism (Harper/Collins, 1995)
- Doing the Truth in Love: Conversations about God, Relationships and Service (Paulist Press, 1995)
- Ongoing Incarnation: Johann Adam Möhler and the Beginnings of Modern Ecclesiology, New York: Crossroad Herder, 1997

=== After 2002 ===
"The Church Is Conciliar." The Many Marks of the Church. Ed. By William Madges and Michael J. Daley. New London, Connecticut: Twenty-Third Publications, 2006.

"Spirituality and Redemption." Spirituality for the 21st Century: Experiencing God in the Catholic Tradition. Ed. by Richard W. Miller. Liguori, Missouri: Liguori, 2006.

"The Church and the World in Conversation: The City of God and ‘Interurban' Dialogue." New Theology Review 18, #1 (February, 2005)

"Lay Ministers and Ordained Ministers." Lay Ministry in the Catholic Church: Visioning Church Ministry through the Wisdom of the Past. Ed. by Richard W. Miller. Liguori, Missouri: Liguori, 2005. The Mystery of Faith: An Introduction to Catholicism. Cincinnati: St. Anthony Messenger Press, 2004

"What Can We Learn from the Church in the Nineteenth Century?" The Catholic Church in the 21st Century: Finding Hope for Its Future in the Wisdom of Its Past. Ed. by Michael J. Himes. Liguori, Missouri: Liguori, 2004.

"Möhler as Church Historian." Papers of the Nineteenth Century Theology Group 34, 2003 Annual Meeting of the American Academy of Religion, ed. by Darrell Jodock, David C. Ratke, and Charles J. T. Talar. Eugene, Oregon: Wipf and Stock, 2003.

"The Catholic Intellectual Tradition: Challenges and Responses." Examining the Catholic Intellectual Tradition 2: Issues and Perspectives. Ed. by Anthony J. Cernera and Oliver J. Morgan. Fairfield, Connecticut: Sacred Heart University Press, 2002.

"Public Theology in Service to a National Conversation." Religion, Politics, and the American Experience: Reflections on Religion and American Public Life. The Public Religion Project. Ed. by Edith L. Blumhofer. Introduction by Martin E. Marty. Tuscaloosa: University of Alabama Press, 2002.

"Reading the Signs of the Times: Theological Reflections." The Catholic Theological Society of America: Proceedings of the Fifty-seventh Annual Convention. Berkeley, California: Catholic Theological Society of America, 2002.

== Professional activities and awards ==
Himes was the author of numerous articles and books, including two that were recognized with the Catholic Press Association Book Award in Theology: Fullness of Faith: The Public Significance of Theology (Paulist Press, 1993) and Ongoing Incarnation: Johann Adam Möhler and the Beginnings of Modern Ecclesiology (Crossroad Herder, 1997). In 1992 the Boston College chapter of Phi Beta Kappa presented him with its Award for Outstanding Teaching, awarded by O Massachusetts Chapter (Boston College) of Phi Beta Kappa, 2002.

Most Influential Teacher Award, voted by the graduating class of the University of Notre Dame, 1990, 1991.

The Notre Dame Social Concerns Award, awarded by the Center for Social Concerns of the University of Notre Dame, 1995.

The Sophia Award for Theological Excellence in Service to Ministry, awarded by the Trustees and Faculty of the Washington Theological Union, Silver Spring, Maryland, 1999.

Doctor of Letters; St. Joseph's College, New York, 1992.

Doctor of Humane Letters; Sacred Heart University, Connecticut, 1999.

Doctor of Letters; Molloy College, New York, 2000.

Doctor of Humane Letters; Felician College, New Jersey, 2001.

== Classes offered ==
- Introduction to Christian Theology I & II
- The Problem of Belief in Modernity
- Sacramental Principle
- Introduction to Ecclesiology
- Approaches to Faith
- Contemplation and Ethics
- Twilight of Belief
- Golden Age of Atheism
- Newman and Kierkegaard
- Theology and the Rise of Humanistic Atheism Part I: Slouching towards Feuerbach
