= Hentz =

Hentz is a surname. Notable people with the surname include:

- Caroline Lee Hentz (1800–1856), American novelist and author
- Charlie Hentz (born 1948), American basketball player
- Eta Hentz (1895-1986), Hungarian-American fashion designer
- Morgan Hentz (born 1997), American volleyball player
- Nicholas Marcellus Hentz (1797–1856), French American educator and arachnologist

== See also ==
- Wentz
