= Charles A. Hines =

United States Army general

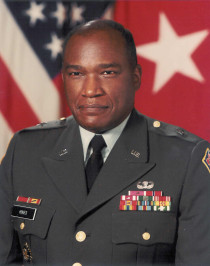
- Brigadier General Charles A. Hines circa Unknown
- Born: Charles Alfonso Hines; September 4, 1935; Washington, D.C., U.S.
- Died: July 4, 2013 (aged 77); Houston, Texas, U.S.
- Resting place: Arlington National Cemetery; Arlington, Virginia; Section 55, Grave 463; 38.8793°N 77.0659°W
- Education: United States Army War College; M.M.A.S., US Army Command and General Staff College; United States Army Military Police School; United States Army Infantry School; Ph.D. Sociology, Johns Hopkins University; M.S. Police Admin. and Public Safety, Michigan State University; B.S. Physical Education, Alpha Phi Alpha, Howard University
- Spouse: Veronica L. Hines (1962–2013; his death)
- Military career
- Allegiance: United States
- Branch: United States Army
- Service years: 1954–1958, 1962–1994
- Rank: Major general
- Units: 90th Military Police Detachment, Vietnam (1966–67)
- Commands: Cdr Army Chemical and Military Police Centers, Fort McClellan (1989–92); Head of Officer Personnel, The Pentagon; Cmdr 519th MP Battalion (1977–79); Provost Marshal, VII Corps, Germany
- Conflicts: Vietnam War
- Awards: >= 14
- Other work: Adjunct Professor of Sociology, Lone Star College System (2002–2013); President, Prairie View A&M University (1994–2002)

Charles Alfonso Hines (September 4, 1935 – July 4, 2013) was an American Army major general, university administrator, and sociology professor.

== Biography ==
A native of Washington, D.C. where he was born on September 4, 1935, Hines enlisted in the United States Army on February 19, 1954 after having completed high school. After completing his active duty commitment as a sergeant, Hines enrolled in Howard University on the G.I. Bill. Upon graduation with a B.S. degree in physical education in 1962, he was commissioned as a second lieutenant in the Army, where he continued to serve with distinction, eventually attaining the rank of major general.

Hines earned an M.S. degree in police science in 1970 from Michigan State University and a Master of Military Art and Science degree in 1971 from the Army Command and General Staff College. His master's thesis for the latter was entitled Analysis of factors associated with guard-prisoner hostility at the U.S. Disciplinary Barracks. Hines later received a Ph.D. in sociology in 1984 from the Johns Hopkins University, where his doctoral thesis was entitled Military Job Performance Evaluation Patterns in Intraracial and Interracial Dyads: Quantitative and Narrative Aspects.

When Hines took command of Fort McClellan in July 1989, he became the first black commander of a military installation in the South. In 1991, Governor Guy Hunt awarded Hines the Alabama Distinguished Service Medal for his contributions to the Alabama National Guard at Fort McClellan. When Hines retired in 1994, he returned to his hometown to serve as director of Health and Security at the Smithsonian Institution.

Hines served as president of Prairie View A&M University from 1994 until 2002, where he oversaw its role in the Office for Civil Rights (OCR) settlement that resulted in the Texas Commitment funding for four new buildings, additional master's and doctoral degree programs and dollars for development initiatives, student scholarships and endowed chairs. Hines began his career with Lone Star College–CyFair in 2008 as an adjunct faculty student advisor in Student Services. In 2010 he received the Adjunct Excellence Award for the 2009–10 academic year.

== Awards and decorations ==
Basic Parachutist Badge

Legion of Merit
Bronze Star
Alabama Distinguished Service Medal
