= Cragg Hines =

American journalist

Charles Cragg Hines (19 June 1945 - 16 December 2023) was born in Dallas, Texas, was employed by the Houston Chronicle, as a correspondent, bureau chief and columnist, for more than three decades. He retired from the Chronicle in 2007. Since his retirement, Hines wrote for Washingtonian (magazine) as a freelancer and was a Democratic activist since 2008.

in 2001, Hines was named as one of the "Top 50 Journalists" in D.C., by Washingtonian, along with other notable journalists such as Dan Rather, Cokie Roberts, and Bob Woodward.

Hines reported from the Berlin Wall in 1987, and covered each summit meeting with Mikhail Gorbachev, through three administrations. He also reported on Saudi Arabia at the start of the Persian Gulf War, and the September 11 attacks.

== Education and background ==
Hines earned a Bachelor of Science degree in Journalism from the University of North Texas in 1967. While a student, he served as an editor of The Yucca, the yearbook of North Texas State University, in 1964, 1965, and 1966.

Hines was awarded a congressional fellowship, by the American Political Science Association, for the 1970-71 academic school year. The program is a highly selective, nonpartisan program devoted to expanding knowledge and awareness of Congress.

== Career ==
Hines was a news reporter, bureau manager and statehouse correspondent for United Press International, in Dallas, and later in Little Rock. After five years, he left in 1972, and began working at the Houston Chronicle.

Hines' 35-year career with the Chronicle began in 1972, when he worked as a correspondent. Later, in 1983, he served as the paper's Washington bureau chief where he served in that position until 2000. He was a columnist at the Chronicle, until his retirement in 2007.

Hines reported from the Berlin Wall in 1987, when President Ronald Reagan made his "tear down this wall" speech. He also covered each summit meeting with Mikhail Gorbachev, through the Reagan, George H. W. Bush and Clinton administrations. He was in Saudi Arabia at the start of the Persian Gulf War, and wrote the main story in the Chronicle’s special edition, covering the 9/11 terrorist attacks on the Pentagon and World Trade Center.

== Awards and recognition ==
Hines was the recipient of several awards and honors, some of which are listed below.

- 1970-71 Awarded a Congressional Fellowship, by the American Political Science Association, funded by the Ford Foundation.
- 2001 Hines was one of the Top 50 Journalists in D.C., named by Washingtonian magazine.
- 2001 First-place, Texas Associated Press Managing Editors Award.
- 2007 Adweek referred to Hines "One of the great Washington monuments in the journalism community."
- 2019 The Mary Marshall Outstanding Democrat Award, by the Arlington County Democratic Committee.
