= Maximilian Meyer Heine =

German physician (1807–1879)

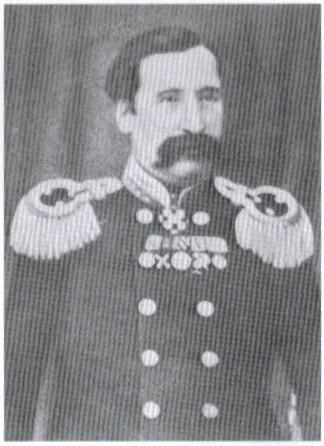
- Born: November 6, 1807
- Died: November 6, 1879 (aged 72); Berlin
- Occupation: State councilor

Maximilian Meyer Heine also Maximilian von Heine (November 6, 1807 - November 6, 1879) was a German doctor and Russian state councilor. He served with the Russian Army during the Russo-Turkish War. He was the youngest brother of Heinrich Heine.

He graduated from the universities of Berlin and Munich in 1829 and joined the Russian army as a surgeon. He died in Berlin in 1879.
