= Klaus Heine =

Lecturer in luxury marketing, luxury brand management

- Education: Technische Universität Berlin (Business Administration); Macquarie University, Sydney
- Occupations: Lecturer, Consultant
- Employer: Emlyon Business School
- Known for: Luxury brand management, luxury marketing, brand personality, brand identity

Klaus Heine is a lecturer in luxury marketing, luxury brand management, brand personality and brand identity at the Emlyon Business School and works as an independent consultant specializing in luxury brand management.

== Biography ==
Klaus Heine studied Business Administration with a focus on marketing and human resources at Technische Universität Berlin and Macquarie University in Sydney. He wrote his Master thesis at ThyssenKrupp Asia/Pacific in Shanghai about the marketing of European product innovations in China and his doctoral dissertation at TUB about the identity of luxury brands. He is currently working as a researcher and lecturer at the chair of marketing at TUB and as an independent [consultant] specializing in luxury brand management.

He conducted qualitative and quantitative luxury consumer surveys in Europe and on-site in China and published his research results in scientific and business conferences and international journals. His research initiated a broad press coverage in Germany with articles for instance in Die Zeit, Handelsblatt, Focus, Manager Magazin, and Süddeutsche Zeitung. Dr. Heine worked for the consulting company trommsdorff + drüner, which is affiliated with the marketing chair, and also on various independent consulting projects, which includes, amongst others, the Luxury Institute New York and Mont Charles de Monaco.

== Publications ==
- Heine, K. (2012), Die Identität von Luxusmarken, In: The Luxury Business Report, 30 March 2012
- Heine, K. (2011) [www.worldluxurybranddirectory.com The World Luxury Brand Directory], ISSN 2193-5440, Technische Universität Berlin
- Heine, K. (2009) Is Berlin Luxury the Future Luxury? Presented at the International Herald Tribune Techno Luxury Conference, Berlin, 16–18 November.
- Heine, K. (2009) The Impact of the Luxury Brand Identity on Packaging Design. Presented at the LuxePack Conference, Monaco, 20–22 October.
- Heine, Klaus: The Concept of Luxury Brands. Luxury Brand Management, No. 1, ISSN 2193-1208
- Heine, K. (2012) The Identity of Luxury Brands, luxury marketing, Technische Universität Berlin
- Phan, M., Thomas, R., Heine, K. (2011) Luxury Brand Revitalization through Social Media, Presented at the KAMS Fall Conference, Seoul, 19 November.
- Phan, M., Thomas, R., Heine, K. (2011) Social Media and Luxury Brand Management: The Case of Burberry. In: Journal of Global Fashion Marketing, Vol. 2, Issue 4, pp. 213–222.
- Heine, K., Phan, M. (2011) Trading-Up Mass-Market Goods to Luxury Products. In: Australasian Marketing Journal, Vol. 19, Issue 2, pp. 108–114.
- Heine, K., Kübrich, K., Phan, M. (2010) The Definition of Luxury Products by their Constitutive Characteristics. Presented at the KAMS Fall Conference, Seoul, 27 November.
- Heine, K. (2010) Identification and Motivation of Participants for Luxury Consumer Surveys by Viral Participant Acquisition. In: The Electronic Journal of Business Research Methods, Vol. 8, Issue 2, pp. 132–145
- Heine, K. (2010) Luxury & Sustainability: Implications of a Consumer-oriented Concept of Luxury Brands. Presented at the ITU-TUB Joint Conference, Istanbul, 10–12 November.
- Heine, K. (2010) The Personality of Luxury Fashion Brands. Journal of Global Fashion Marketing, Vol. 1, Issue 3, pp. 154–163.
- Heine, K., Trommsdorff, V. (2010) Dimensions of the Luxury Brand Personality. Proceedings of the Global Marketing Conference, Tokyo, 9–12 September, pp. 453–465.
- Heine, K., Trommsdorff, V. (2010) The Universe of Luxury Brand Personality Traits. Presented at the Global Marketing Conference, Tokyo, 9–12 September, p. 439.
- Heine, K. (2010) A Theory-based and Consumer-oriented Concept of Luxury Brands. Presented at the In Pursuit of Luxury Conference, London, 18 June.
- Heine, K. (2010) Identification and Motivation of Participants for Luxury Consumer Surveys. Proceedings of the 9th European Conference on Research Methodology for Business and Management Studies, Madrid, 24–25 June, pp. 183–193.
- Heine, K. (2010) The Luxury Brand Personality Traits. Proceedings of the 6th Thought Leaders International Conference in Brand Management, Lugano, 18–20 April.
- Heine, K., Trommsdorff, V. (2010) Practicable Value-Cascade Positioning of Luxury Fashion Brands. Proceedings of the 9th International Marketing Trends Conference, Venice, 21–23 January
- Heine, K. (2009) Using Personal and Online Repertory Grid Methods for the Development of a Luxury Brand Personality. In: The Electronic Journal of Business Research Methods, Vol. 7, Issue 1, pp. 25–38
- Heine, K. (2009) Using Personal and Online Repertory Grid Methods for the Development of a Luxury Brand Personality. Proceedings of the 8th European Conference on Research Methodology for Business and Management Studies, Valletta, Malta, 22–23 June, pp. 160–170.
