= U.S. Army Garrison Baden-Württemberg =

U.S. Army Garrison Baden-Württemberg oversaw a diverse group of United States military communities in the southwest of Germany, focusing on maintaining a high quality for the life of soldiers, civilians and family members under the U.S. Army's Installation Management Command Europe Region Headquarters at Patton Barracks in Heidelberg. It provided support and supervision for U.S. Army Garrison Kaiserslautern, among others.

USAG Baden-Wuerttemberg was activated March 27, 2008. Its original predecessor organization from 1991 to 2005 was the 26th Area Support Group. From 2005 until 2008, USAG Heidelberg fulfilled both the local community support and regional command functions.

Besides providing homes for thousands of American forward-deployed soldiers and their families, until 2013 the communities also served as bases for several major headquarters, including U.S. Army Europe and IMCOM-Europe Region.

Due to the relocation of the U.S. Army Europe headquarters and all its personnel to Wiesbaden, U.S. Army Garrison Baden-Württemberg and all its services were closed on 26 September 2013. The last active military US Installations located in the Mannheim and Heidelberg area of the German state of Baden-Württemberg were scheduled to close by the end of 2014.
