= Reinis Zālītis =

Latvian footballer (1943–2005)

Reinis Zālītis (19 September 1943 – 15 October 2005) was a Latvian football defender, famous for playing for Daugava Rīga.

Zālītis first began to play football in the sports school of Daugava Riga in the early 1950s. His first coach was the renowned Latvian football player, Makss Levitanuss. In 1961, he played for the Latvia youth team; in 1962 for RVR Rīga; in 1963 for RER Rīga. For both of the latter seasons, he was also a member of the reserves squad of Daugava Rīga. In 1964, he became a full-time regular with Daugava and remained as such until 1975 (with a break in 1974), capping more than 300 main squad appearances. From 1974 to 1976, he also was involved in coaching the Daugava squad. In later years, he played with Torpedo Riga.

Because of his big height and good playing with the head, Zālītis often played in the opponent's penalty area for free kicks and corner kicks. With Daugava Zālītis, he made more than 300 main squad appearances until 1973.
