= Justice Hines =

Justice Hines may refer to:

- Geraldine Hines (born 1947), associate justice of the Massachusetts Supreme Judicial Court
- Harris Hines (1943–2018), chief justice of the Georgia Supreme Court
- James K. Hines (1852–1932), associate justice of the Supreme Court of Georgia
