= Ulmus americana 'Hines' =

Elm cultivar

- Species: Ulmus americana
- Cultivar: 'Hines'
- Origin: Hines Nursery, Souris, Manitoba, Canada

The American elm cultivar Ulmus americana 'Hines' was listed in the accessions of the Morden Arboretum, apparently sourced from the Hines Nursery, Souris, Manitoba in 1940. The tree was not recognized as a valid cultivar by some authorities.

== Description ==
Not available.

== Pests and diseases ==
'Hines' was susceptible to Dutch elm disease.

== Cultivation ==
No specimens are known to survive; the two specimens at Morden had both died from Dutch elm disease by 2001.

== Etymology ==
Named for the Hines Nursery (now defunct), which raised it.
