= Charles Heinz (singer) =

Charles Robert Heinz (November 16, 1940 – April 2011) was a pop and religious singer, and minister of music, in Germantown, Tennessee.

His father was an elder in the family's church.

In his mid-teens, he recorded two of the earliest 45 rpm pop-music records for Satellite Records, which soon became Stax. At 16, he was preparing for the release of "Destiny", backed by "Prove Your Love". He asked a girl named Freda (whom he would later marry) that he be invited to her 13th birthday party, and they began dating.

The flip-side song proved a local hit on release in 1959, but in September 1960, his "Suddenly", backed by "Nobody Cares", was released, with less success.

After dating for three years, he and Freda "ran away", and married with her parents permission.

He took a job in the management of a retail store, and moved his family to Alabama to take a promotion.

Becoming dissatisfied with his work, he moved the family back to Tennessee; his father sensed a spiritual dissatisfaction, and urged a pastor friend to see whether their interests would be as close as he sensed. The son and the pastor found a common ground, and Heinz became involved in the pastor's use of music with this congregation. Heinz found this activity fulfilling, and in time took charge of and developed the music program beyond expectations, and made it his career.

In February, 2011, he celebrated his retirement from the ministry, and died in April of the same year at the age of 70.
