= Wolfgang Heinz (politician) =

German politician (born 1938)

Wolfgang Heinz (born 31 July 1938 in Grünstadt) is a German politician of the Free Democratic Party.
