= Ernst Bernard Heyne =

Ernst Bernhard Heyne (15 September 1825 – 16 October 1881) was a German botanist and horticulturist and a pioneer in the early development of agriculture in Australia.

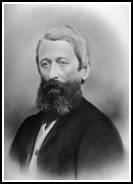
E.B. Heyne

Ernst Bernhard Heyne (1825-1881) born on 15 September 1825 at Meissen, Saxony, son of Carl August Heyne, M.D., and his wife Marianne Tierof. Heyne graduated with a Diploma of Botany from the University of Leipzig, Saxony. As an accomplished linguist and mathematician, he obtained a position at the Royal Botanic Gardens, Dresden. In 1848 he was chosen to lead a botanical expedition in Spain, but it was cancelled because of political troubles. Heyne's brother Carl, who had become involved in politics, killed an officer in a duel and fled to America. Although not implicated, Ernst also decided to migrate to Australia and left Hamburg for Melbourne Australia on board the 'Godefroi'.

Life in Australia

His journey and arrival in Melbourne on 13 February 1849 are described in his letters, published in German as Australia Felix (Dresden, 1850. They contain shrewd observations of the climate, soil, vegetation, water supplies and economy and habits of the colonists and the local indigenous population as well as advice to prospective migrants.

After his father died, he purchased a house in Richmond and his mother Marianne and his younger sister Agnes migrated to Melbourne where his mother continued her educational work.

In 1854 Heyne was employed at the Melbourne Botanic Gardens as chief plantsman. He drew one of the earliest designs for the layout of the gardens. When Ferdinand von Mueller became director, Heyne was appointed his secretary and went with him on several Victorian expeditions. He helped to classify much of the botanical material collected by von Mueller in the 1850s, and is commemorated by Aster heynei F. Muell. = Olearia xerophila, and Cyperus heynei Boeckel. = Cyperus ornatus R. Br. His created a large herbarium which was destroyed after his death.

In January 1869, Heyne moved to Adelaide where he made an extensive collection, since lost, of local seaweeds. He is credited with finding Dicksonia antarctica on the eastern slopes of the Mount Lofty Ranges. The identification of these tree-ferns, now extinct in South Australia, is authenticated by a specimen in the Melbourne Botanic Gardens: the label written by von Mueller reads: Mount Lofty, S. Austr. 1870—E. B. Heyne.

Heyne established a nursery at Hackney, near Adelaide, and opened a shop for seeds and plants in Rundle Street. He contributed regularly to the South Australian Register and the Observer chiefly on the cultivation of forest trees, forage plants and pasture grasses. The colonists were then interested in finding the crops best suited to their soil and climate, and those plants and trees likely to prove of economic and industrial importance. Heyne translated many articles and pamphlets on viticulture from German, French and Spanish, and wrote on the best methods of treating plant diseases, especially dodder in lucerne and oidium in vines. At a meeting sponsored by the Chamber of Manufactures in 1870 after a lecture by Dr Moritz Schomburgk, Heyne spoke on the importance of growing trees, hedges, hickory, yellow willow, sultana vines, tobacco, sunflowers and mulberries. He had published Vines and their Synonyms in 1869 and became secretary to the Vignerons' Club, which in 1876 presented him with a gold watch as a tribute to his work.

In 1871 Heyne published The Fruit, Flower and Vegetable Garden, which was enlarged as The Amateur Gardener in 1881 and ran to four editions. His Rueckblick in German had appeared in the 1850s.

Heyne was a sincere adherent of the Evangelical Lutheran Church, but on 3 December 1870 at the Unitarian Christian Church, Adelaide, he married Wilhelmina Laura, daughter of Heinrich Edouard Hanckel, bookseller of Norwood, and his wife Johanne, née Von Bruno. They had three daughters, Agnes, Laura and Ida and two sons.

Heyne continued to work until he became ill with asthma and nearly blind. He died on 16 October 1881 at his home in Norwood. His son Carl was still at Roseworthy Agricultural College and, when he qualified, managed his father's shop and nursery with a partner.

Though serious, Heyne was known to be cheerful and sociable with many friends, delighted in conversation, and a prodigious writer. Though overshadowed by von Mueller, his botanical and horticultural work greatly contributed to the early development of two colonies.

The Heyne Nursery in Adelaide continued under the direction of his son Carl Franz (1869-1948). The Heyne Garden Centre was established by his grandson Franz Waldemar (1913-2003) and continues today as the Heyne Garden Centre.
