= Wolfgang Heinz (criminologist) =

German criminologist (born 1942)

Wolfgang Heinz (born 23 April 1942 in Pforzheim) is a German criminologist and writer on jurisprudence.
