= Heinie =

Heinie may refer to:

== Slang and pejorative terms ==
- A slang term for the buttocks
- A derogatory term for German soldiers that originated in World War I; also a crewcut haircut (from the stereotypical German soldier's haircut)
- A slang term for Heineken International, a Dutch brewing company

== Nickname ==
=== Major League Baseball players ===
- Heinie Beckendorf (1884–1949)
- Heinie Berger (1882–1954)
- Heinie Elder (1890–1958)
- Heinie Groh (1889–1968)
- Heinie Heitmuller (1883–1912)
- Heinie Heltzel (1913–1998)
- Mike Hiney (1935-2020)
- Heinie Jantzen (1890–1948)
- Heinie Kappel (1863–1905)
- Heinie Manush (1901–1971)
- Heinie Meine (1896–1968)
- Heinie Mueller (outfielder) (1899–1975)
- Heinie Mueller (second baseman) (1912–1986)
- Heinie Odom (1900–1970)
- Heinie Peitz (1870–1943)
- Heinie Reitz (1867–1914)
- Heinie Sand (1897–1958)
- Heinie Scheer (1900–1976)
- Heinie Schuble (1906–1990)
- Heinie Smith (1871–1939)
- Heinie Stafford (1891–1972)
- Heinie Wagner (1880–1943)
- Heinie Zimmerman (1887–1969)

=== Other ===
- Harry C. Aderholt (1920–2010), U.S. Air Force brigadier general
- Heinie Benkert (1901-1972), back in the National Football League (NFL), 1925-1930
- Heinie Beau (1911–1987), jazz composer, arranger, saxophonist and clarinetist
- Heinie Conklin (1886–1959), an actor in silent comedy films
- Heinie Jawish (1900-1941), early NFL player
- Heinie Kirkgard (1898-1967), halfback in NFL, 1923
- Heinie Miller (1893–?), early NFL player
- Heinie Schultz, played in the American Professional Football Association in 1920
- Heinie Weisenbaugh (1914–1965), NFL back

== See also ==
- Heinrich
