= Hines (name) =

Origin
- Meaning: Hynes, Ions, Hynds, Hindes, Ince

Hines is both a surname and a given name.

== Etymology ==
According to the Oxford Dictionary of Family Names in Britain and Ireland, the modern name Hines and its variants derive from two quite different medieval names.

1. The Irish Ó hEidhin, which means 'descendant of Eidhin'. The dictionary adds that Eidhin itself is "a personal name of uncertain origin. It may be a derivative of eidhean 'ivy', or it may represent an altered form of the place-name Aidhne" and that "the principal family of this name is descended from Guaire of Aidhne, King of Connacht. From the 7th century for over a thousand years they were chiefs of a territory in east County Galway. There appears to have been another branch of the family located in east County Limerick'".
2. The Middle English name Hine (with the addition of the genitive -s case ending, implying that the name-bearer was the child of a father called Hine, or addition of -s on the analogy of such names). This occupational name derives from Old English hīne ('household servant, farm labourer'), but in the Middle English period could also mean 'farm manager' and also be used of high-status people serving in a lordly household.

== Distribution ==
Around 2011, there were 4206 bearers of the surname Hines in Great Britain and 61 in Ireland. In 1881, there were 2471 bearers of the name in Great Britain, spread throughout England but especially in Lancashire. In the mid-nineteenth century, Irish examples of the name were concentrated in Offaly.

== People ==
Notable people with the name include:

=== Surname ===
- Hines (Kent cricketer), British cricketer
- Adrian Hines (aka MC ADE), American musician
- Andre Hines (born 1958), American football player
- Andrico Hines (born 1980), American football player
- Barbara Hines, American baseball player
- Barbara Hines (born 1950), American artist
- Barry Hines (1939–2016), British author
- Bo Hines (born 1995), American football player and politician
- Brendan Hines (born 1976), American actor and singer-songwriter
- Brian Hines (born 1944), the birth name of British rock musician Denny Laine
- Chasen Hines (born 2000), American football player
- Cheryl Hines (born 1965), American actress
- Chris Hines (born 1987), American basketball player
- Chris Hines (environmentalist), British surfer and activist
- Christopher Hines, American documentary film director and journalist
- David Gordon Hines (1915–2000), British accountant
- Deni Hines (born 1970), Australian singer
- D'Juan Hines (born 1994), American football player
- Donald E. Hines (1933–2019), American politician and physician
- Duncan Hines (1880–1959), American food critic
- Earl Hines (1903–1983), American jazz pianist
- Edward N. Hines (1870–1938) American road builder and developer
- Francis Hines (1920–2016), American artist
- Frank T. Hines (1879–1960), American military officer
- Frazer Hines (born 1944), British actor
- Geoff Hines (born 1960), New Zealand rugby player
- Gerald D. Hines (1925–2020), American real estate developer
- Gregory Hines (1946–2003), American actor and tap dancer
- Gustavus Hines (1809–1873), American missionary
- Harris Hines (1943–2018), American judge
- Jerome Hines (1921–2003), American basso opera singer
- Jesse K. Hines (1829–1889), American politician
- Jim Hines (1946–2023), American track and field athlete
- John L. Hines (1868–1968), American Army general
- Johnny Hines (1895–1970), American actor
- Karen Hines, Canadian actress and director
- Kyle Hines (born 1986), American basketball player
- Marcia Hines (born 1953), American-Australian actress and TV personality
- Marie Hines, American singer-songwriter
- Maurice Hines (1943–2023), American actor, director, singer and choreographer
- Melissa Hines (born 1951), American-born British neuroscientist
- Nathan Hines (born 1976), Australian/Scottish rugby player
- Nyheim Hines (born 1996), American football player
- Paul Hines (1855–1935), American baseball player
- Peter Hines (born 1948), Australian footballer
- Peter F. Hines (1927–1984), American attorney and politician
- Rico Hines (born 1978), American basketball coach
- Robert L. Hines (born 1970), American comedian
- St. Aubyn Hines (born 1972), Jamaican boxer
- Tanook Hines (born 2006), American football player
- Ted Hines (1926–1983), American librarian
- Thomas Hines (1838–1898), Confederate spy during the American Civil War
- Tiffany Hines (born 1985), American actress
- Timothy Hines, American film director
- Tyler Hines (born 1990), American basketball player
- Walker Hines (railroad executive) (1870–1934), American railway executive
- Zavon Hines (born 1988), British footballer

=== Given name ===
- Hines Holt (1805–1865), American lawyer and politician
- Hines Johnson (1910–1987), Jamaican cricketer
- Hines Ward (born 1976), American football player

== See also ==
- Heinz (surname)
- Heinz (given name)
- Hine (disambiguation)
- Hynes
- Heine, a surname
- Heines, a surname
- Hinds (surname)
