= Theres Rohde =

German curator and museum director

Theres Sophie Rohde (born 1983) in Heidelberg), Baden-Württemberg is a German media and cultural studies scholar. Since 2015, Rohde has worked as a research assistant at the Museum of Concrete Art in Ingolstadt, since 2016 she has served as a curator and deputy director at the museum. On August 6, 2021, she was appointed the museum's director.

== Life ==
From 2003 until 2007 Theres Rohde studied Media culture at the Bauhaus University, Weimar. Her master's thesis was titled wohnMASCHINEnmensch Haus am Horn as an educational utopia for the new human being. While she was a student, she began volunteering as a "Bauhaus Guide" in 2006, along with other students. The students organized tours for university visitors on the history of the Bauhaus. Due to the great success of these walks in 2007, the students were hired by the university as Student Assistants. After completing her master’s degree, Rohde joined the Bauhaus Transfer Center for Design whose goal was to connect university graduates with potential employers. She was also in charge of the Bauhaus Shop. After completing her master's degree, Rohde became a fellow in the Deutsche Forschungsgemeinschaft at the Graduate Program Medial Historiographies. In 2015 she earned her doctorate at the Bauhaus University in Weimar with a dissertation titled Die Bau-Ausstellung zu Beginn des 20. Jahrhunderts oder die Schwierigkeit zu wohnen. In her dissertation, she examined modernist architecture and housing exhibitions such as the Darmstädter Künstlerkolonie Mathildenhöhe, the Weissenhof Estate in Stuttgart, and other concepts of the German Werkbund. When the position of director of the Museum of Concrete Art became vacant in 2021, 15 candidates applied. Rohde prevailed over five other candidates who had also made the shortlist. Rohde chairs the board of the Stiftung für Konkrete Kunst und Design (Foundation for Concrete Art and Design) and is a visiting lecturer in the design department at the Technische Hochschule Ingolstadt. She also serves on the board of the Gesellschaft für Designgeschichte in Frankfurt. Since 2025, Theres Rohde is also a member of the board of trustees of the Internationale Bauausstellung, Munich Metropolitan Region.

== Management of the Museum ==
As the new director of the Museum of Concrete Art, Rohde was actively involved in planning the new building of the museum.

=== During the Pandemic ===
At first, the COVID-19 pandemic and the two lockdowns called for creative solutions to figure out how to still reach the audience: "If people can't come to the museums, then the museum will simply come out to them!" Rohde designed the exhibition Bernhard Lang: Most Beautiful from a Distance with this motto in mind. Since 2010, photographer Bernhard Lang has been taking photographs of the Earth from high altitudes. Due to the distance from which they are taken, his aerial photographs resemble Concrete art, and it is only upon closer inspection that it becomes clear what these patterns are actually made of. For the show, Rohde used the cultural advertising displays scattered throughout the city, which were empty at the time because cultural events could not be held. Fifty of Bernhard Lang’s Aerial views were displayed there in a size of 2 metres (6.6 ft) × 2.40 metres (7.9 ft) . This meant the exhibition could be viewed from anywhere in the city without requiring the museum as a venue. Through repeated exposure to the artworks, the museum established itself as an important institution in the city and as a driving force for culture. One of the following exhibitions she curated, she titled humorously and ambiguously Hängepartie (Cliffhanger): "A Hängepartie is a time of uncertainty, of unresolved circumstances, of stalling. [...] Rather than falling into a state of shock, the Museum of Concrete Art seeks to recognize the potential in this Hängepartie for the museum, art, and the public. It aims to reinterpret the generally negative connotation and turn it into an exhibition. Art with an open ending also means art with a special intensity, art that makes you think."

=== Construction delays of the new museum ===
The opening of the new museum in the Alte Gießereihalle was originally scheduled for 2019, but due to complications at the construction site, the opening was repeatedly postponed. In 2026, a burst water hose caused the opening to be delayed until 2027. Theres Rohde: "About a year ago [in March 2023], we reached a point where we said, ‘Okay, we’ll close in September, and then there’ll be nothing.’ And we didn't have any exhibitions lined up, but then we were told it would take another year. I can't just say, ‘Oh well, that’s how it is,’ – instead, I need a program, another year’s worth of programming." And this repeatedly happened year after year. Planning an exhibition including securing all loans and conducting licensing research usually takes a full year; nothing happens quickly or just like that. Nevertheless, Theres Rohde’s team managed to keep the museum active with exhibitions throughout this period, including such significant ones as the 2024 exhibition Martin Creed: I don’t know what art is and, in the same year – in collaboration with the Museum im Kulturspeicher Würzburg – 24! Questions on Concrete Art. The massive increase in construction costs also required ongoing communication with the public. These included, among other things, the blog documenting progress at the construction site and the site tours offered by the museum. In addition, the new building was repeatedly brought to the public’s attention through art installations, such as light art at the construction site. In order for the public to stay informed, the museum also developed an app that allowed visitors to track the progress of the construction site. Once the new building opens, the app will serve as a multimedia exhibition guide. Rohde adopted the app developed by the Landesstelle für die nichtstaatlichen Museen in Bayern (State Office for Non-State Museums in Bavaria) and used it as another medium to generate public interest in the new museum. When the museum opens in 2027, the focus of Rohde’s work will be on developing the museum into a cultural flagship with national and international appeal. In doing so, she does not adhere to a strictly historical conception of Concrete Art: "Concrete Art began very strictly, excluding many trends. Then it became more diverse; the element of chance, for example, suddenly played a role. I think Concrete Art will evolve. This is simply because Concrete Art also has a lot to do with materials, and new ones are constantly being added –Plexiglas years ago, for instance, or new media. Concrete Art does, however, have the potential to remain true to its core."

== Exhibitions curated by Theres Rohde (selection) ==
- 2016: Verknüpft: Haleh Redjaian und die Sammlung (Haleh Redjaian and the Collection) (As part of the Gewebeproject by Stadtkultur Netzwerk Bayerischer Städte e.V.)
- 2016: Logo. Die Kunst mit dem Zeichen (Logo. The Art of the Symbol)
- 2017: Out of Office
- 2018: Carlos Cruz-Diez. Color in Motion
- 2019: Gemalte Diagramme: Bauhaus, Kunst und Infografik
- 2021: Raum — Licht — Zeit: Susa Templin
- 2021: Bernhard Lang: Mit Abstand am schönsten
- 2022: Hängepartie

== Exhibition catalogs (selection) ==
- 2016: Rohde, Theres; Schimpf, Simone, eds. (2016). Logo. Die Kunst mit dem Zeichen [Logo. The Art of the Symbol] (in German). Frankfurt am Main: Surface. ISBN 978-3-93985544-6.
- 2017: Rohde, Theres; Schimpf, Simone, eds. (2017). Out of Office (in German). Frankfurt am Main: Surface. ISBN 978-3-93985551-4.
- 2018: Rohde, Theres; Schimpf, Simone, eds. (2018). Carlos Cruz-Diez. Color in Motion (in German). Frankfurt am Main: Form. ISBN 978-3-94396269-7.
- 2019: Rohde, Theres; Schimpf, Simone, eds. (2019). Gemalte Diagramme: Bauhaus, Kunst und Infografik [Painted Diagrams: Bauhaus, Art, and Infographics] (in German). Berlin: Kerber. ISBN 978-3-73560553-5.
- 2024: Listl, Mathias; Holsing, Henrike; Rohde, Theres, eds. (2024). 24! Fragen an die Konkrete Gegenwart [24! Questions for the Concrete Present] (in German and English). Berlin: Deutscher Kunst Verlag. ISBN 978-3-42280222-3.

== Publications ==
- 2025: Voelker, Sven (2025). "This book was produced in collaboration with the Museum of Concrete Art in Ingolstadt". Das Museum der Formen: Ein interaktives Bilderbuch über Geometrie, Formenvielfalt und Kreativität für Kinder [The Museum of Forms: An interactive picture book about geometry, diversity of shapes, and creativity for children] (in German). Berlin: Hatje Cantz. ISBN 978-3-7757-6051-5.
