= Museum of Concrete Art =

Art museum in Ingolstadt, Germany

Coordinates: 48.7616°N 11.4273°E

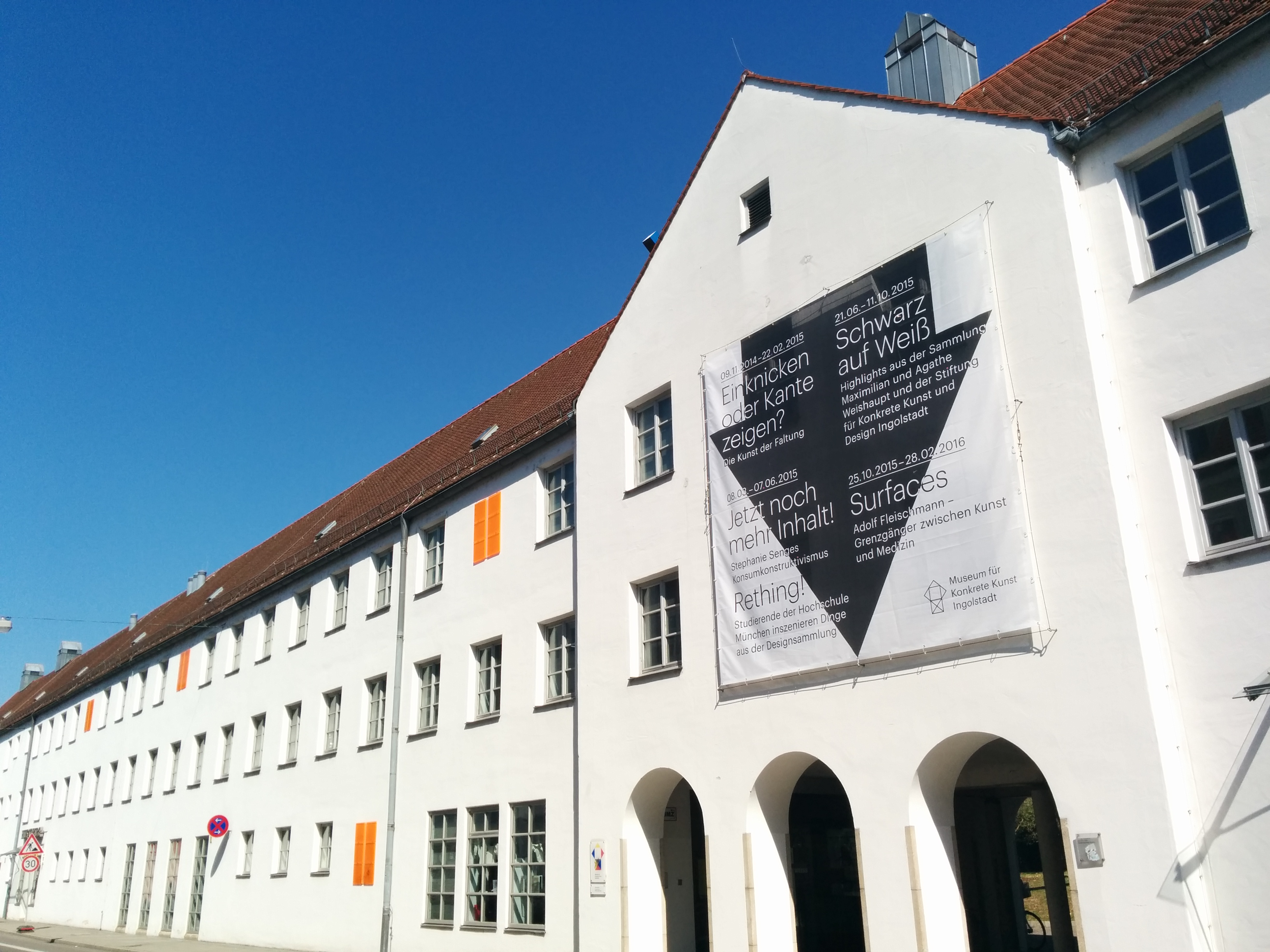
- Established: 1992
- Location: Ingolstadt, Germany
- Director: Theres Rohde
- Website: www.mkk-ingolstadt.de

Museum of Concrete Art (German: Museum für Konkrete Kunst) in Ingolstadt, is a German museum that presents the diversity of concrete art since its inception, with permanent and temporary exhibitions in a space of approximately 800 square metres (8,600 sq ft). The museum includes art collected by Eugen Gomringer and works from the 20th and 21st centuries Stiftung für Kunst und Design (Foundation for art and design). It also has long-term loans from the Maximilian and Agathe Weishaupt collection.

The museum opened in 1992 at the Tränktorstraße in Ingolstadt. A new building in Quartier G of the city is under construction and is expected to open in 2027.

== Establishment ==
The museum opened in 1992 in its current location, a historic 18th-century barracks building at the Tränktorstraße in Ingolstadt. The architectural design by the Munich-based architects Claus and Forster was awarded the BDA Prize for Bavaria in 1993.

Concrete art does not refer to the building material but is an art movement. The term was first used in the 1930s by the Dutch artist Theo van Doesburg, who wrote a manifesto about what art in his opinion should convey: "The artwork must have been fully conceived and developed in the mind before its execution. It must not contain forms dictated by nature, sensuality, or emotion. Lyricism, drama, symbolism, etc., are to be avoided. The painting must be constructed exclusively from purely pictorial elements, i.e., from planes and colors. A pictorial element means nothing other than itself; consequently, the painting also means nothing other than itself." On the internet site of the museum it states: "There is hardly any modern art movement that continues to generate so many misunderstandings, myths, and fears to this day. Yet Concrete Art is an immediate art movement designed to engage the senses, one that can be understood even without any prior knowledge—but necessarily also without prejudice. It is a non-representational art form in painting, sculpture, film, or installations that does not seek to depict the visible world. Consequently, colors, shapes, lines, and – by extension – materials take on special significance. [...] The Museum of Concrete Art stands for the idea of the Concrete art movement and not for a static, one-dimensional interpretation of Concrete Art, which has always been subject to change anyway."

The museum also focuses on selected aspects of design, which are often closely linked to concrete art and their creators. It also includes the Stiftung für Konkrete Kunst und Design (Foundation for Concrete Art and Design), which was established in 2007 by Ludwig Wilding, the City of Ingolstadt, and Ingeborg König, the widow of Ludwig Wilding. The foundation is supported by Audi ArtExperience, a cultural sponsorship program of the company Audi. The foundation's goal is to preserve the estates of significant artists of concrete art and make them accessible to the public. The chairperson of the foundation always is the current museum director; as of 2021, this has been Theres Rohde.

== Collections and donations ==
=== Eugen Gomringer Art Collection ===
The foundation of the collection was laid by the acquisition of the private art collection of Eugen Gomringer in 1981. Gomringer was one of the leading figures of so-called concrete poetry. The acquisition was made possible by support from industry and artisan businesses, as well as numerous donations from the citizens of Ingolstadt.

=== Collection of the Stiftung für Kunst und Design ===
The Stiftung für Kunst und Design (Foundation for art and design) focuses on works from the 20th and 21st centuries. Since its founding in 2007, the collection has been continuously expanded. By 2022, the foundation’s collection already comprised 20 artists’ estates, with the artworks alone valued at 5.6 million euros. The foundation not only manages the estates and maintains contact with heirs, artists, and designers, but also ensures the necessary restoration of the artworks when required: "Providing the thousands of items in the collection with the necessary conservation treatments and climate-controlled storage conditions remains the foundation’s greatest challenge. Rising material and personnel costs make it difficult to implement these often urgent measures."

=== Long-term loans from the Maximilian and Agathe Weishaupt collection ===
In 2004, parts of the Sammlung Maximilian und Agathe Weishaupt were exhibited for the first time at the Museum of Concrete Art. Since 2009, there has been an agreement between the Sammlung für Konkrete Kunst und Design, the museum, and the Stiftung für Konkrete Kunst und Design, under which targeted acquisitions are made for the newly planned Museum of Concrete Art and Design. Agathe Weishaupt herself commented "Part of our philosophy as collectors has always been to make these works known to the public and to display them in exhibitions. After all, art does not thrive in storage; it needs people to see it and appreciate it. I am therefore all the more delighted that our collection has had a second home at the MKK in Ingolstadt since 2004."

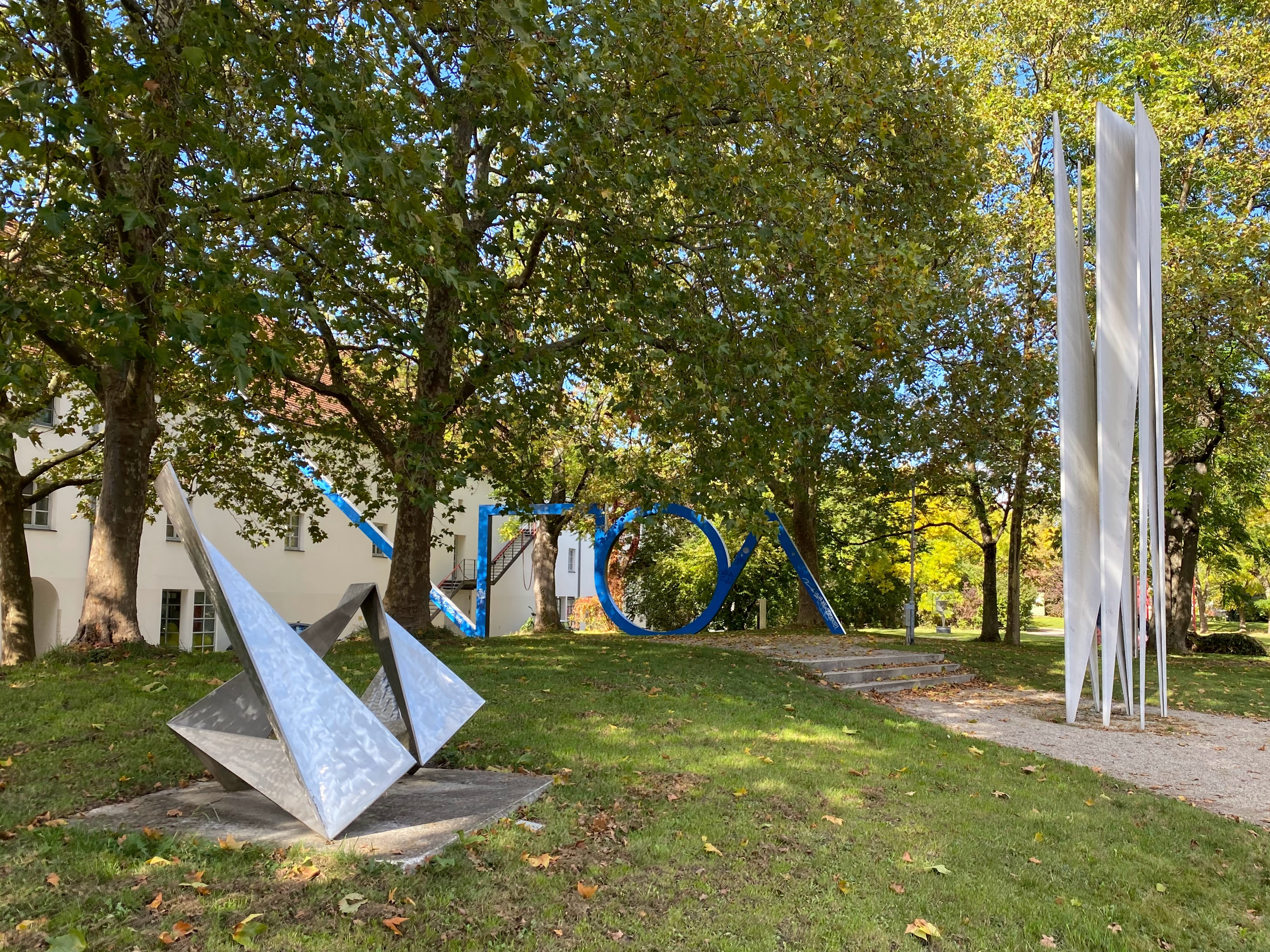
The museum's sculpture garden

=== Sculpture garden ===
The sculpture garden includes works by Ben Muthofer, Marcello Morandini, David Rabinowitsch and Ulrich Rückriem.

=== Design Collection ===
Since 2000, the museum has also been building its own design collection, which explores the connections between concrete art on the one hand and modern product design on the other. The Bauhaus, the Hochschule für Gestaltung Ulm as well as the Deutsche Werkbund advocated for modern, mass-market, yet aesthetically pleasing products.

Artists such as Max Bill and Anton Stankowski worked at the intersection of art and design. To reflect the close connection between concrete art and design, the museum will adopt the additional title "Museum of Concrete Art and Design" upon its reopening.

In 2014 and 2015, the museum received a substantial design collection as a donation from Wilfried and Inge Funke. It comprises approximately 850 items dating from around 1920 to 1970 and includes porcelain, household utensils and ceramics from well-known manufacturers. Simone Schimpf, who was the museum’s director at the time said: "It is a great and unexpected stroke of luck for the Museum of Concrete Art to have acquired the Funke Collection, a carefully curated collection assembled over more than forty years. No museum today could purchase objects of such quality or such a precise selection."

== Scheduled new museum building ==
In 2012, the city council approved plans to build a new museum in the historic Alte Gießereihalle in the eastern part of the old town. The need for a new building arose not only because of the very limited exhibition space of 800 square metres (8,600 sq ft), but also due to outdated climate control systems. In addition, the rooms in the old museum building were too low for large exhibits, as they were at most 2.60 metres (8.5 ft) high. They will be 16 metres (52 ft) high in the new museum. In addition, a freight elevator will be installed, and rooms for a restaurant and a shop will be provided.

=== The Renovation of the Historic Hall ===
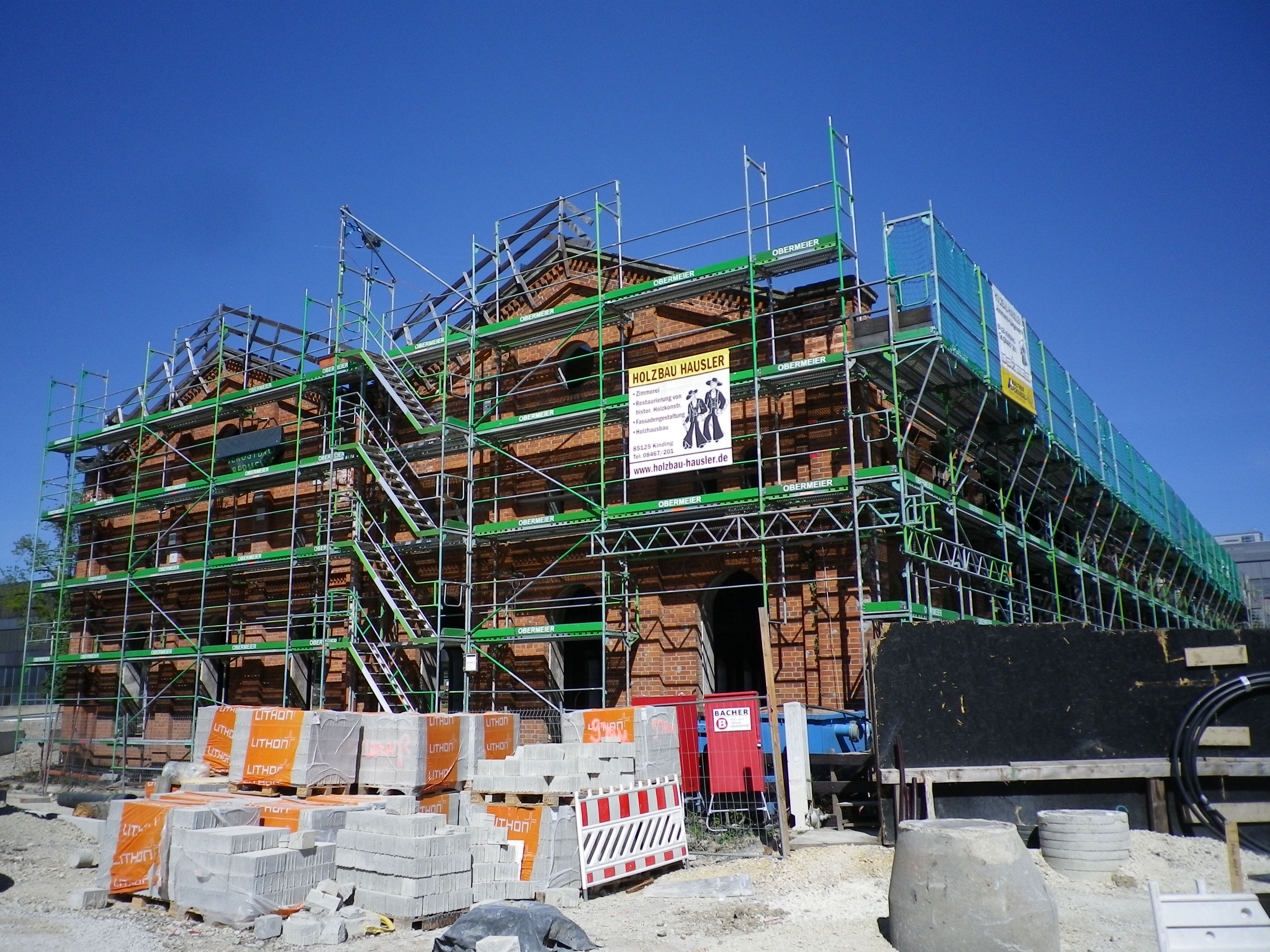
Picture of the Construction side of the Hall (2020)

From a structural engineering perspective, the renovation of the historic hall, built in 1882, presented the developers with significant challenges. On the one hand, the hall is a listed building, so its exterior could not be altered; at the same time, however, all modern technical installations and the museum’s requirements for the space had to be met. The winning design by the Vienna-based firm Querkraft Architects called for the hall to be fitted with a completely new basement level, which would be used in the future as exhibition spaces for the museum.

This required a great deal of preparatory work, such as lowering the groundwater level so that they could work on the underground structure at all. 72 large-diameter bored piles had to be driven up to 15 metres (49 ft) deep into the ground to transfer the loads from the building above. Peter Kirchmann, the project manager, said: "These large-diameter bored piles are essential for transferring the load of the historic foundry building to the load-bearing underground and for continuing the archaeological excavation work from the current depth of minus 5 metres (16 ft) to minus 7.10 metres (23.3 ft)".

As part of the historic preservation process, archaeological excavations were carried out to a depth of up to 7 metres (23 ft), taking four months to complete. This required the installation of an additional 170 bored piles. Jan Weinig of the company Pro Arch was one of the archeologists who worked on the securing and conservation of the archeological finds, and said: Tools made of metal and wood, as well as wheelbarrows, were unearthed from the industrial age. Many uniform parts from the early 20th century, but also ammunition, some still in wooden crates from the 18th century, and especially numerous clay grenades, were recovered.

The historic cast-iron columns that had previously supported the hall’s load were temporarily removed for the construction site, replaced with temporary supports, and later reinstalled to restore the hall to its original appearance. As a result, the old crane runway – which was once used to transport heavy loads in this industrial landmark – is now visible again. In April 2025, the emergency staircase was installed; a crane was required for the job due to the components weighing several tons. That same month, work began on reinstalling the large historic window facade facing the Danube. Holger Kirchmann summarized: "From the very beginning, I have been fascinated by the fact that the historic foundry hall, dating back to 1882, has been preserved almost entirely, and that the history of that era has not been lost. Rather, by transforming the former foundry hall into the new Museum of Concrete Art and Design, we have succeeded in preserving the existing historical fabric and repurposing it for a new use. Standing in the historic building, with sunlight streaming through the large windows on the north and south sides into the interior of the hall, has never lost its fascination after all these years and will continue to captivate museum visitors in the future."

In April 2026, an exhibition opened at the Museum of Concrete Art that focused on the construction project and its development: Becoming MKKD: Vom Planen und Entstehen eines Museums (Becoming MKKD: From the Planning to the Creation of a Museum.

=== Costs of the new building ===
Initially, the project was estimated to cost 25 million euros, and the museum was scheduled to open in 2019. However, there were many delays in the project, which mean that the museum will not open fully until 2027. At the same time, the estimated costs for the new building continued to rise. Among other factors, the complicated foundation work for the underground structure drove up costs, huge price increases in the construction industry, the complex and time-consuming archaeological surveys of the underground, and the necessary upgrades to bring the project up to current technical standards. In 2026, the final cost of the new construction was estimated at 60 million euros. In October 2026, it was announced that the new building would cost even more than previously planned, with total costs now estimated at almost 63 million euros. Reasons given for this included rising construction prices, the level of inflation, and the particularly complex preparation of the building site's foundation. Peter Schapp of the architectural firm Querkraft Architects summed it up: "The budget was unrealistic from the start. But it wasn’t even possible to estimate the costs accurately."

=== City setting ===
The new building will form the centerpiece of the newly created Quartier G, which will be home to six different institutions from Ingolstadt’s cultural and creative industries. Since the historic entrance hall, with its high foundation arches and tall windows, will remain freely accessible, visitors can still access the main hall, even if they do not wish to visit the museum’s temporary exhibitions in the basement. According to the archaeologist Jan Weining, the foundry hall is the last completely preserved building of its kind – the nucleus of Ingolstadt's industrialization and prosperity and because of its dimensions in height and length radiates an almost sacred atmosphere. The museum shop, restaurant, and permanent exhibitions of the museum’s many collections will be located upstairs in the hall.

For the landscaping of the area between the new museum and the Technische Hochschule Ingolstadt, the Friends of the Museum Association will donate an outdoor sculpture to the city, designed by the architectural firm Jürgen Mayer H.: "The sculptures consist of honeycomb structures made from locally sourced wood, which is assembled on-site. The use of this renewable raw material contributes to sustainability and CO2-reduction and underscores a commitment to environmentally friendly construction practices. The method of constructing the sculptures also allows for expanded use in the future. Art installations, Light art-festivals with projections onto the sculptures, and performative events could stimulate the entire plaza and define it as a contemporary urban space that reflects and engages with the media, communication, and technologies of our time."

== Directors ==
- 1992 – 2002: Peter Volkwein
- 2002 – 2012: Tobias Hoffmann
- 2013 – 2021: Simone Schimpf
- 2021 – on-going: Theres Rohde

== Exhibitions (selection) ==
- 2006: DieNeuen Tendenzen: Eine europoische Kiinstlerbewegung 1961-73 (The New Tendencies: A European Artist Movement 1961-73)
- 2016: Logo. Die Kunst mit dem Zeichen/Logo. The Art of the Symbol
- 2018: Color in Motion: Carlos Cruz-Diez
- 2020: Mind the Gap!
- 2024: Martin Creed: I don’t know what art is
- 2024: 24! Fragen an die Konkrete Gegenwart (24! Questions for the Concrete Present) (together with the Museum im Kulturspeicher Würzburg)
- 2026: Becoming MKKD: Vom Planen und Entstehen eines Museums (Becoming MKKD: From Planning to Realization of a Museum)
