= Ludwig Wilding =

German visual artist (1927–2010)

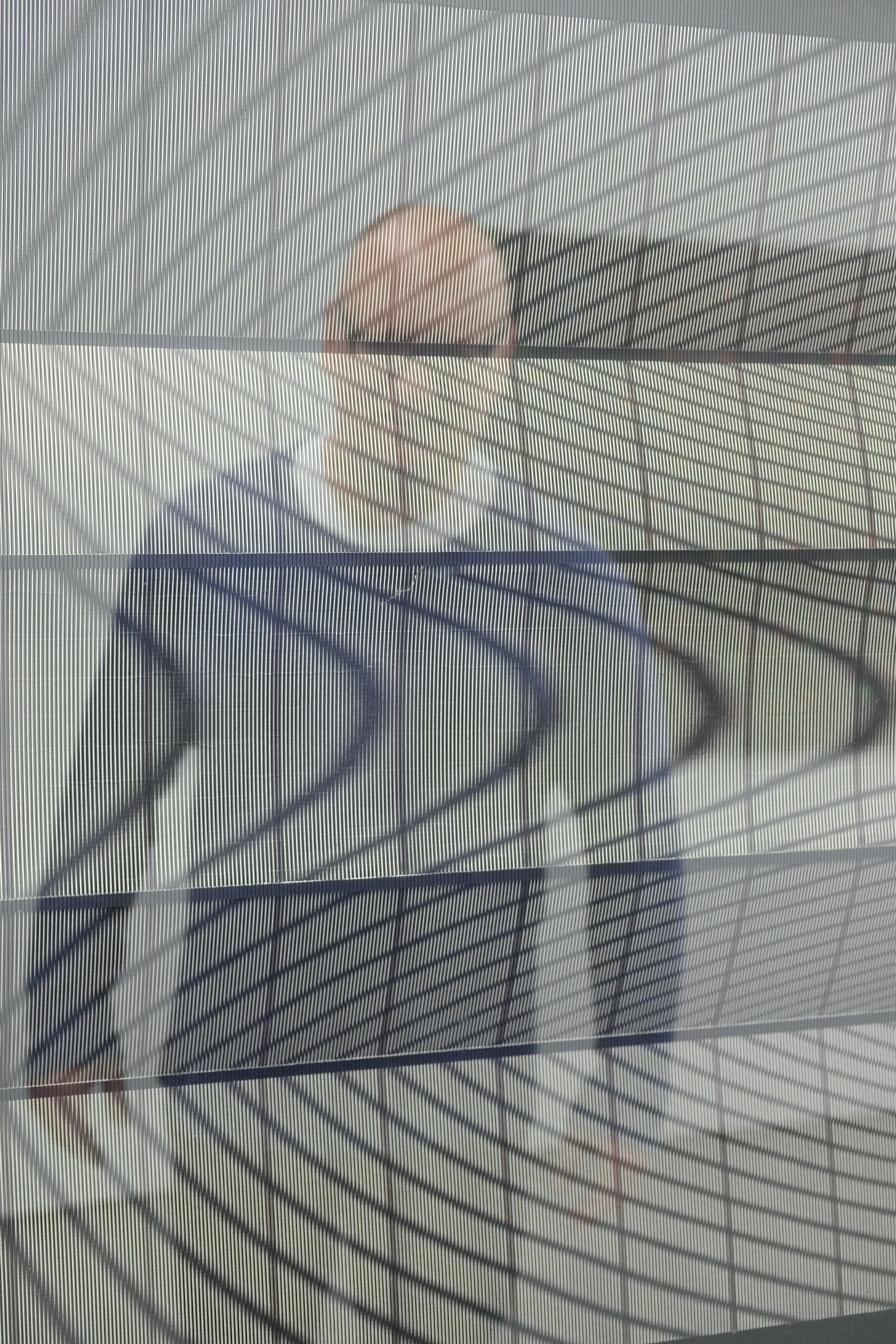
- Born: 19 May 1927; Grünstadt, Germany
- Died: 4 January 2010 (aged 82)
- Education: University of Mainz, State Academy of Fine Arts Stuttgart
- Occupation: Visual artist
- Known for: Painting
- Movement: Op art, kinetic art

Ludwig Wilding (19 May 1927 – 4 January 2010) was a German visual artist, whose work is associated with Op art and Kinetic art. Wilding lived in Düsseldorf, and Westheim, Germany.

== Biography ==
Wilding was born in Grünstadt, Germany. He studied at the University of Mainz Art School, from 1949 to 1950; and at the State Academy of Fine Arts Stuttgart, from 1952 to 1954, under Willi Baumeister.

Wilding's works are three-dimensional structures that create shifting patterns through their black and white designs. He has shown at the Museum Leverkusen (1953); Zimmergallery (1958), Frankfurt; and Studio F (1965), Ulm. His work was included in The Responsive Eye (created vy curator William C. Settz at the Museum of Modern Art in New York, 1965), Eyes, Lies, and Illusions (Hayward Gallery, London, 2004) and Optic Nerve: Perceptual Art of the 1960s (The Columbus Museum of Art, Ohio, 2007).

A retrospective of his work was held in 2007 at the Museum of Concrete Art in Ingolstadt.
