= Marcello Morandini =

Italian architect, sculptor and graphic designer

Marcello Morandini (2017)

Marcello Morandini (born 15 May 1940) is an Italian architect, sculptor and graphic designer. His visual style involves assembling of repetitive simple forms, often in just black and white, into complex objects.

== Biography ==
Marcello Morandini was born on 15 May 1940 in Mantua and moved to Varese in 1947. He studied at the Brera Academy in Milan and began working as an industry designer and graphic artist.

In 1965, ten of his works were exhibited in a solo show in Genoa, during which time he opened his own design studio in Varese. In 1967 he participated in exhibitions in Milan, Frankfurt, Cologne and, by an invitation from the critic Gillo Dorfles, in São Paulo. Since then, he held numerous solo exhibitions worldwide. During the Venice Biennale in 1968, he was given an entire room of the Italian Pavilion.

As an architect, Morandini designed and made his own home-studio in Varese in 1968. In 1974 he carried out the project of a 30-meter wide square inside the INA Varese mall. In 1982, through a collaboration with architecture studios Mario Miraglia in Varese and Ong & Ong in Singapore, he designed the 38-story Goldhill Centre in Singapore. In 1984 he designed 220-meter-wide facade of the "Thomas" porcelain brand factory from Rosenthal GmbH chain in Speichersdorf. Three years later, he continued collaboration with Rosenthal for the 64-meters wide facade of their new administrative building in Selb. In 2005, he designed the ground floor of the Piazza Montegrappa in Varese, and in 2007 Das kleine Museum of Weißenstadt.

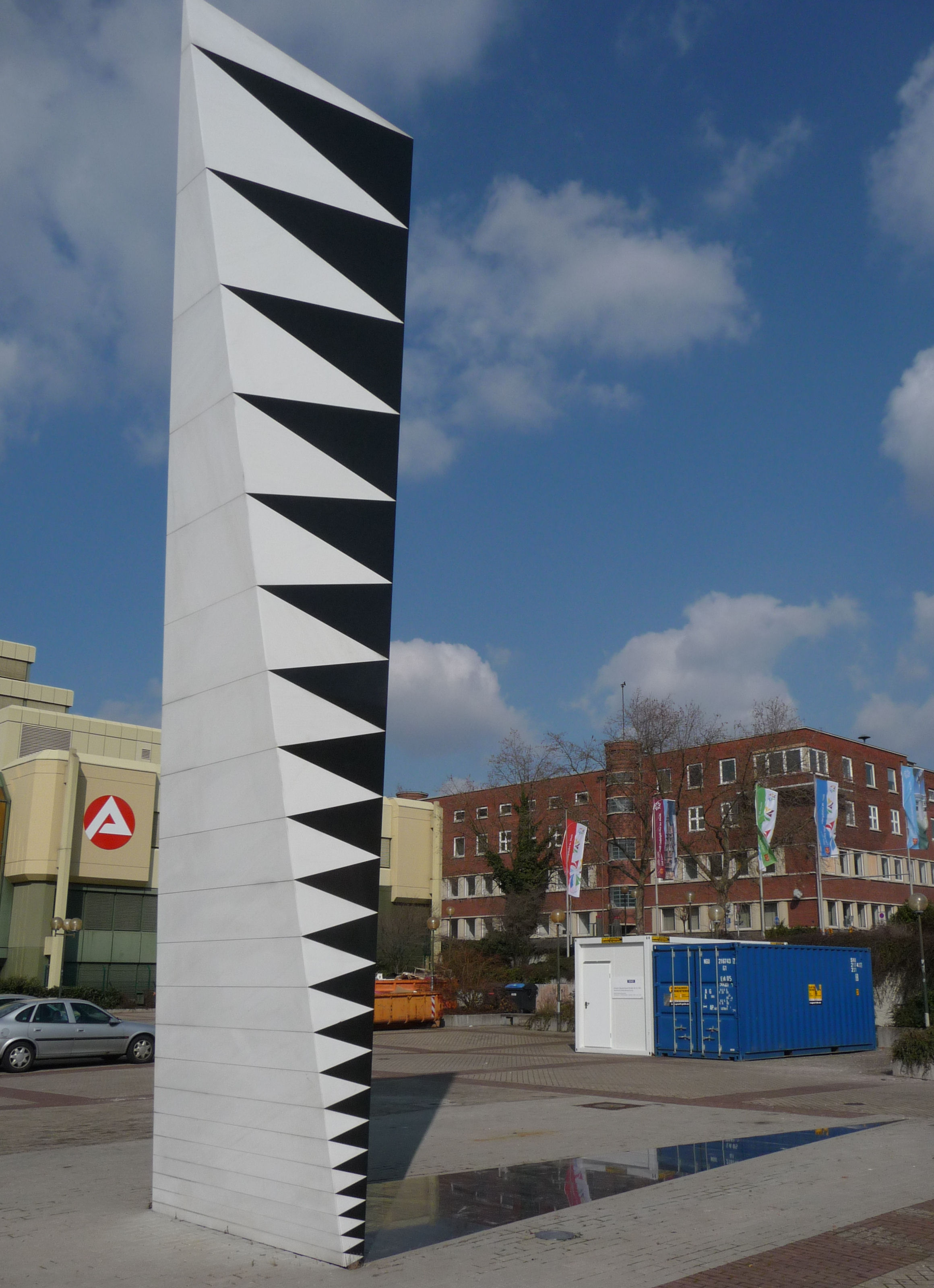
Ombralatina in Ludwigshafen, Germany

In 1990 Morandini designed and built a sculpture at the entrance of the Museum für Konkrete Kunst in Ingolstadt, Germany.

As a designer, Morandini designed Bine chair for Sawaya and Moroni, the bench owned by Cleto Munari, the black and white chair Cà Pesaro in 2008, the Spyder table and cabinet Valentina for residential baleri Bergamo, a table lamp for Tecnodelta. As homage to Philip Rosenthal, he created collections Constructed Wave, Arcus, Motion, Chapeau Philip, Kunstdruck Nr. 1, the bookcase Corner, and the chessboard Morandini.

Since 1994 Morandini was a member of the jury of the Design Centre in Essen, and until 1997 he was president of the International Museum of Ceramic Design in Cerro, hamlet of Laveno-Mombello in Lombardia. Between 1995 and 1997, Morandini taught art and design at the Summer Academy in Salzburg. He was a visiting professor at École cantonale d'art de Lausanne 1997–2001, a professor at the Brera Academy in Milan in 2003 and at the HEAA school of watchmaking in La Chaux-de-Fonds, Switzerland. In 2004 he was appointed Royal Designers for Industry for the ceramics arts by the Royal Society of Arts (RSA) in London.

== Style ==
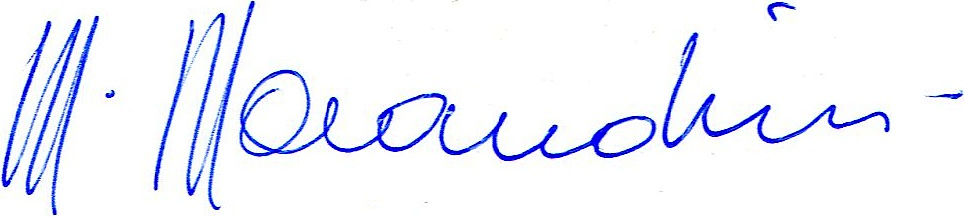
The architect's signature

Morandini's materials of choice are glossy panels of acrylic glass or lacquered wood. In his words, "all my works of art are born under the sign of architecture; the whole design sector can largely be defined as architecture for everyday use." His style is characterized by the use of white and black, "simple colors that allow you to focus on the form rather than on superficial aesthetics ".
