= Technische Hochschule Ingolstadt =

University of Applied Sciences in Bavaria, Germany

Coordinates: 48.767°N 11.433°E

Technische Hochschule Ingolstadt (THI)
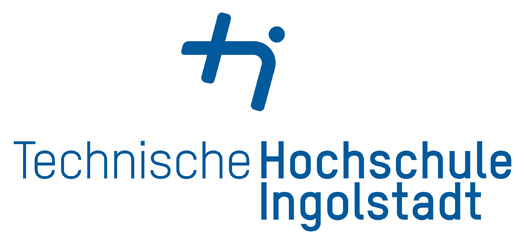
- Motto: Personalities and innovations - for a future worth living
- Type: Public
- Established: 1994; 32 years ago
- Budget: EUR 86 million
- President: Walter Schober
- Faculty: approx. 300
- Administrative staff: approx. 600
- Students: approx. 8.500
- Location: Ingolstadt, Bavaria, Germany
- Colors: blue and white
- Website: www.thi.de

The Technische Hochschule Ingolstadt (THI) is a German public university of applied sciences located in Ingolstadt, Bavaria. It was founded in 1994 as Fachhochschule Ingolstadt. It has been renamed to its current name in 2013. It still keeps its status as a Fachhochschule/HaW. Being one of the leading and prominent universities of applied sciences in the state of Bavaria, it was awarded a temporary and limited right to grant doctorates in 2023 despite not having the status of a research university. Its focus is on practical, creative, and professional education. It has six faculties: Business School, Electronics and Communication technology, Computer Science, Engineering, Sustainability, and Business and Engineering studies. It offers Bachelor, Master and Doctoral Degrees and has around 8,500 students and 900 staff. It is a very internationally oriented university with around 40% foreign students and more than 170 academic partnerships worldwide (2025). There are no university fees for European students. Non-EU countries students will be required to pay tuition fees, which are at €800 per semester for Bachelor's and €1,200 for Master's programs (2025). There are two terms: winter term starts on 1. October until 14. February and Summer term starts on 15. March until 30. September.

== History ==
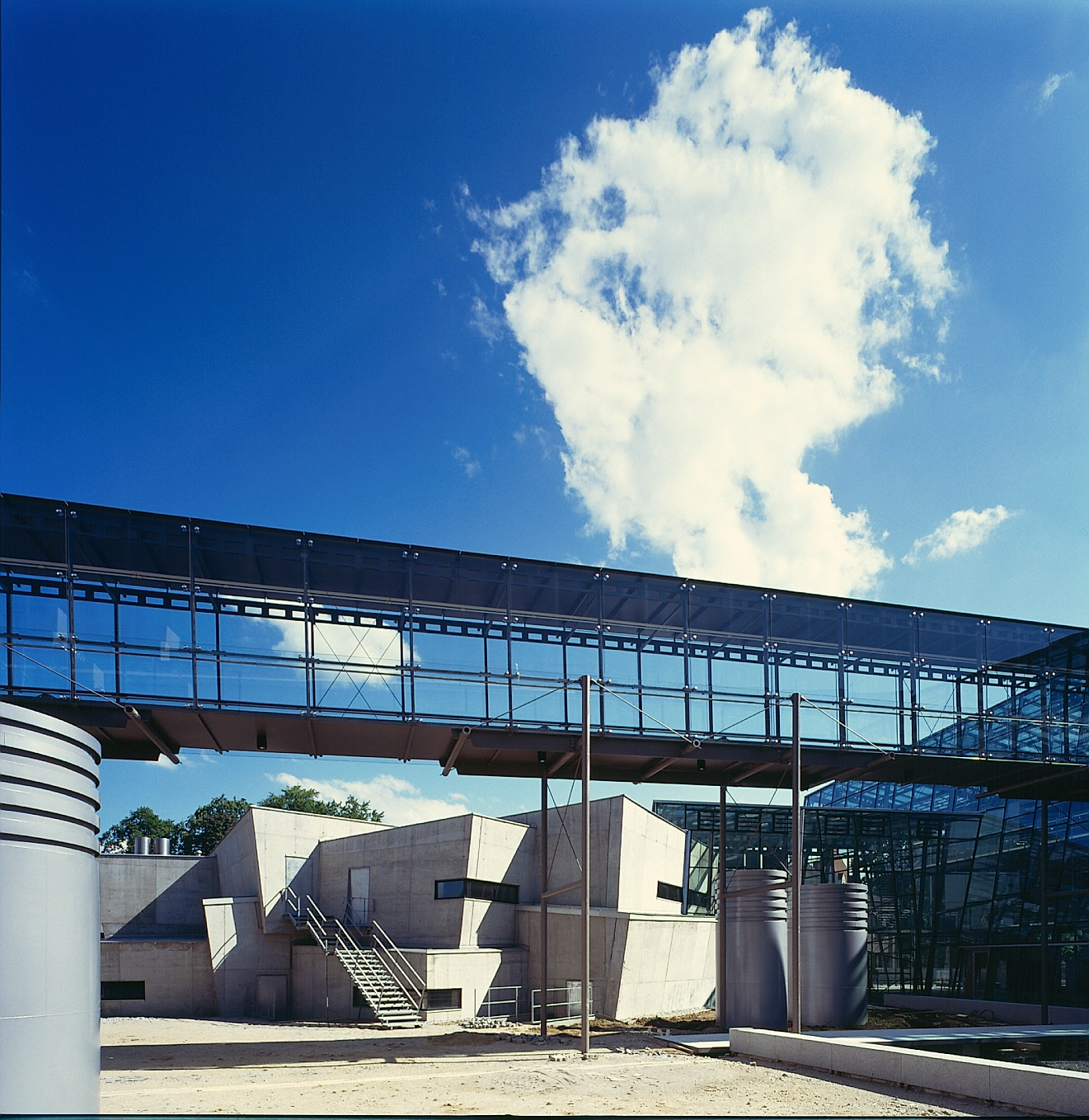
Construction of the new building on the Esplanade 1998

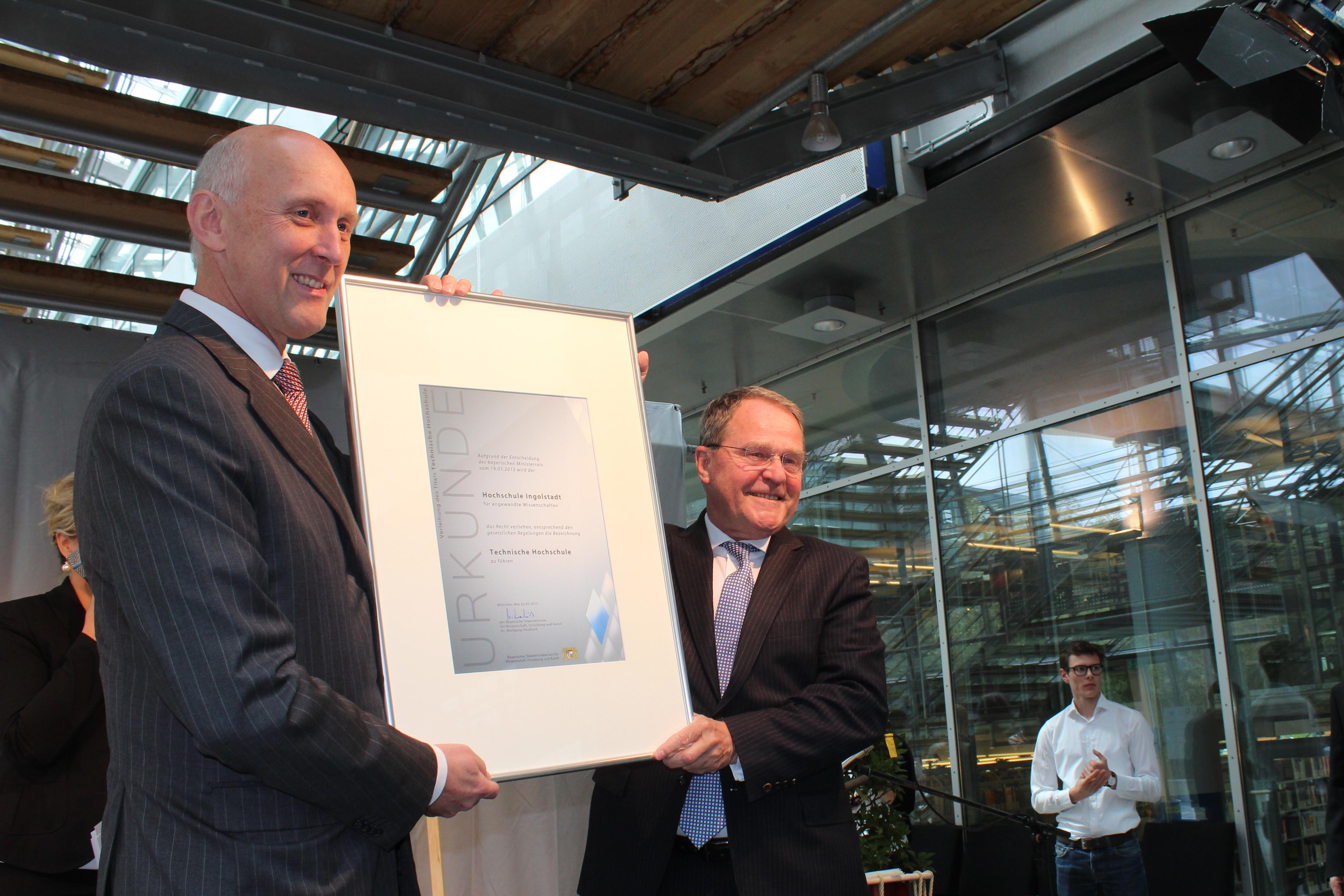
Appointment to Technische Hochschule Ingolstadt (2012): THI President Walter Schober (left) with the Bavarian Science Minister Wolfgang Heubisch.

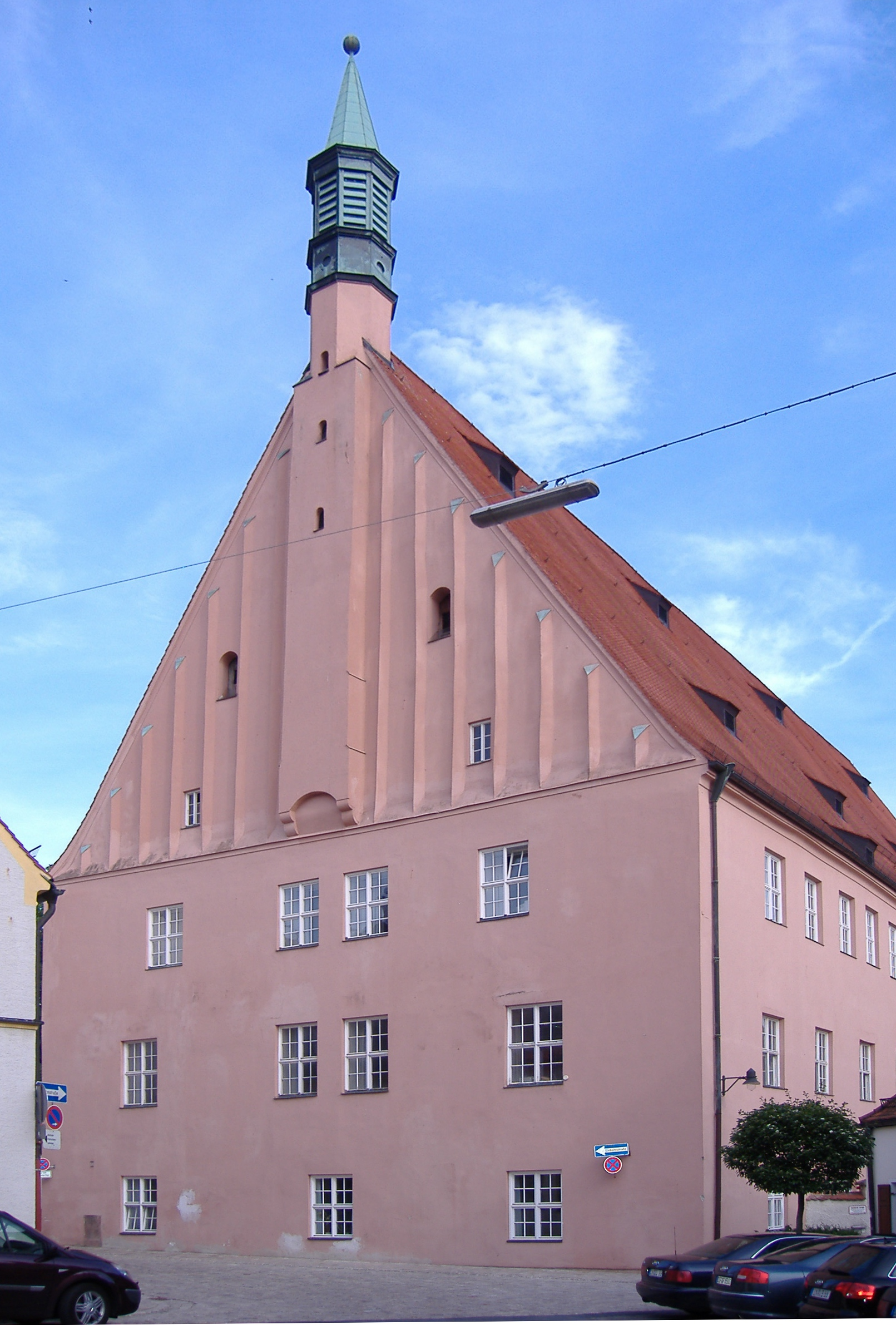
The Hohe Schule in Ingolstadt

After its foundation in 1994, the Technische Hochschule Ingolstadt started teaching at the Hohe Schule in the old town of Ingolstadt. The first course of study in business administration started with 90 students and three professors. The founding president is Hartmut Sax.

In 1999, the university moved into its new building at the Esplanade. The number of students rose to 700 and the range of courses now included five diploma degree programs. Gunter Schweiger became the second president. In 2004, an amendment to the Bavarian Higher Education Act made research a core task of universities of applied sciences alongside teaching. Therefore, the Institut für Angewandte Forschung (Institute for Applied Research, IAF) was founded at the Technische Hochschule Ingolstadt.

In 2008, the Institut für Akademische Weiterbildung (Institute for Academic Continuing Education, IAW) was founded as Bavaria's first faculty for further education. From this point on, the university has had three operating areas: teaching, research and further education. The university's study center in the historic old town of Neuburg a.d. Donau was established in 2009. In 2012, Walter Schober followed Gunter Schweiger as president. In 2015, new campus buildings were inaugurated. The THI campus was thus expanded by an additional 9,200 square meters and almost doubled in size. Then, in 2016, the CARISSMA (Center of Automotive Research on Integrated Safety Systems and Measurement Area) research and test center was inaugurated. It is designed to be a nationwide scientific centre for vehicle safety and is the first research facility at a university of applied sciences in Germany. Also, a research branch of the Instituts für neue Energie-Systeme (Institute for New Energy Systems, InES) and a branch of the Graduate Centre were established in the Neuburg Study Centre.

In 2017 was inaugurated Villa Heydeck: The former director's villa in the north of the foundry grounds became an official THI building. The Audi Confucius Institute Ingolstadt (AKII), a non-profit institution for the promotion of knowledge of the Chinese language and culture, was founded. In addition to strengthening intercultural understanding, AKII's purpose is to promote German-Chinese cooperation in the fields of technology, innovation, sustainability and management. These specializations are unique among Confucius Institutes worldwide. As part of the "FH Impuls" initiative of the Federal Ministry of Education and Research, THI received almost 6 million euros over a period of four years for the strategic partnership SAFIR (Safety for all - Innovative Research Partnership on Global Vehicle and Road Safety Systems).

In 2018, the THI and the Catholic University of Eichstätt-Ingolstadt (KU) launched the joint project "Mensch in Bewegung", which aims at increasing the transfer of technology and knowledge to the region. As part of the federal funding initiative “Innovative Hochschule” ("Innovative University"), the THI and the KU received 15 million euros over a period of five years. Also, the Bavarian Council of Ministers decided to expand the THI by 2,500 students in Ingolstadt and by 1,200 students on a new campus in Neuburg a. d. Donau. At the Ingolstadt campus, the new study field of Health and Life Sciences was established in the winter semester 2020–2021. A new campus was built in Neuburg a. d. Donau with the study field Construction/ Energy/ Environment. The Ingolstadt Research Centre for Artificial Intelligence and Machine Learning (AININ - Artificial Intelligence Network Ingolstadt), which is based at the THI, was founded in 2019. Also in that year, starting from the winter semester 2019–2020, the THI's three faculties were expanded and split into six faculties of:

- Electrical Engineering and Information Technology,
- Computer Science,
- Mechanical Engineering,
- Engineering and Management,
- Sustainable Infrastructure, and
- The THI Business School.

Another thing that happened in 2019 was that in his governmental declaration, Bavarian Minister-President Markus Söder announced that the THI was to become a mobility node in the Bavaria-wide AI network as part of the High-Tech Agenda. The THI is the only university of applied sciences where such a node is located.

In 2020, The Bavarian Center for Applied Research and Technology with Latin America (AWARE) was founded at the THI in January. In March 2020, the Fraunhofer-Anwendungszentrum für Vernetzte Mobilität und Infrastruktur (Fraunhofer Application Center for Integrated Mobility and Infrastructure) opened at the THI.

On 4 October 2021, the THI opened its external location in Neuburg an der Donau. Around 100 students began studying in the degree programs "Sustainability and Environmental Management" and "Industrial Engineering and Construction".

On 31 January 2022, the opening of Bavaria's first modular building of the Hightech Agenda Bayern at the Ingolstadt Campus with an integrated Entrepreneurship Lab was held by Minister President Markus Söder and Minister of Science Bernd Sibler.

In May 2022, the Research and Transfer Centre Sustainability Neuburg (ForTraNN) was opened at the Neuburg Campus as part of the scientific conference "The Great Transformation", which is to deal with interdisciplinary sustainability research and transfer. In 2022, the Bavarian Foresight Institute was founded, which is dedicated to technology-oriented future research.

== Campus ==
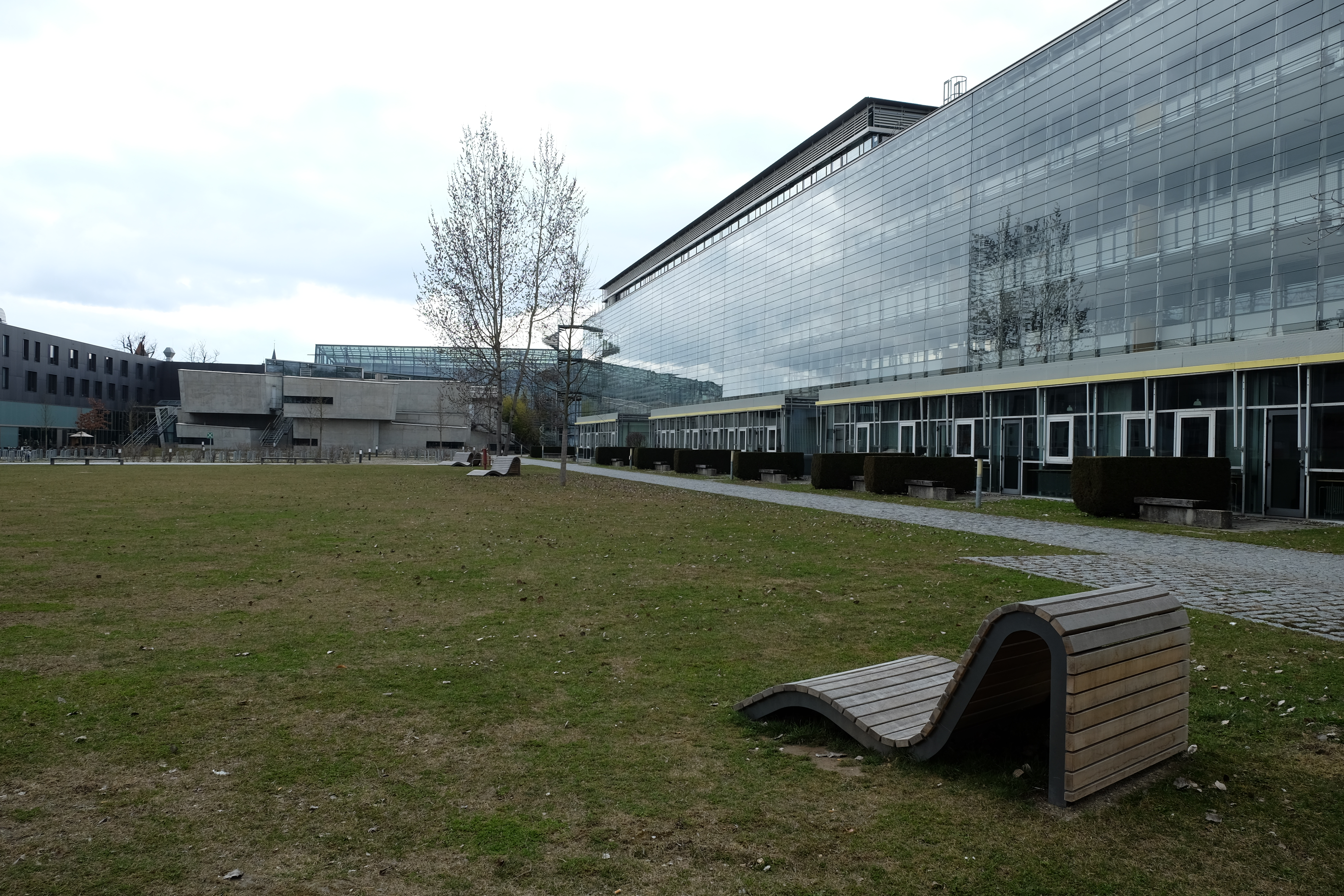
Technische Hochschule Ingolstadt

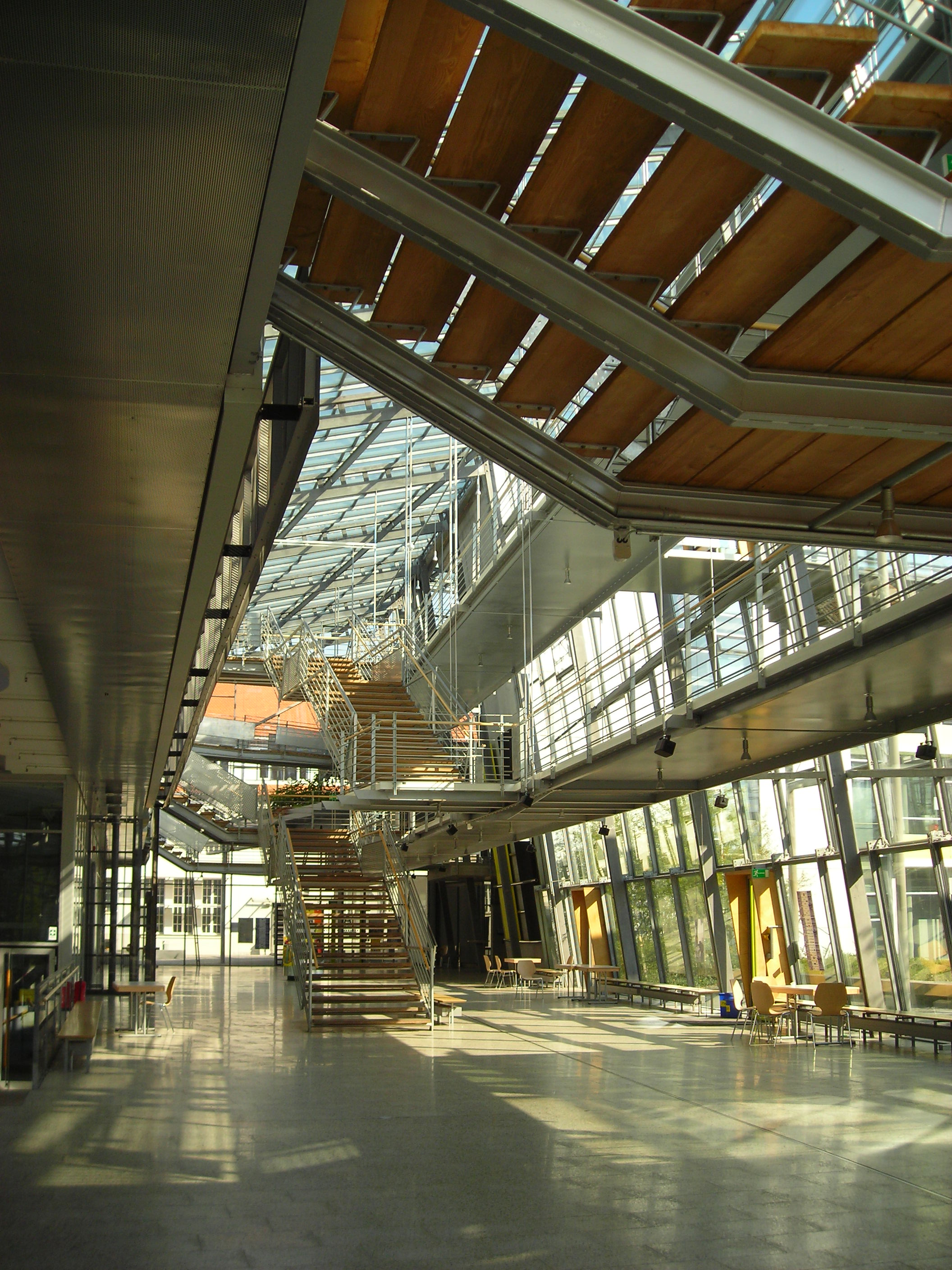
THI – Interior view

The Ingolstadt campus is located directly next to the historic old town. The Neues Schloss and Ludwigstraße, the city's main shopping street, are in the immediate vicinity.

The campus on the Esplanade covers an area of 60,000 square meters. Among other things, it accommodates the publicly accessible library of the THI, 80 lecture halls, project and seminar rooms, 18 large laboratories as well as 80 regular laboratories, PC pools and workshops.

A new campus is built at the Neuburg a. d. Donau location with the field of study Construction / Energy / Environment.

== Academics and teaching ==
The THI offers more than 80 courses of study in the six faculties of:

- Electrical Engineering and Information Technology,
- Computer Science,
- Mechanical Engineering,
- Engineering and Management
- Sustainable Infrastructure, and at
- the THI Business School.

The foundation of a further faculty "Sustainable Infrastructure" based in Neuburg a. d. Donau is in preparation.

Dual studies are possible at the THI in the undergraduate Bachelor's as well as in the Master's program. There are two modes of study: joint studies and studies with in-depth practical experience. In joint studies, the course is combined with vocational training (IHK/HWK degree). Studies with in-depth practical experience combine studying at the THI with periods of practical experience in a company without completion of a vocational training.

THI sees itself as an international university and, as of 2022, it cooperates with about 150 partner universities worldwide.

The university offers a two-year support program called "THI Talent" for exceptionally talented and committed students.

The Center of Entrepreneurship (CoE) at THI coordinates all start-up activities at the university. The center's main task is to support competitive start-ups at the THI and to ensure the transfer of knowledge between research and practice. The university aims at promoting start-ups on its campus as well as in the region.

=== Basic bachelor's degree programmes ===
The THI offers the following Bachelor's degree programmes. All courses of study can also be studied in a dual system.

Course of studies	Degree
Aerospace Engineering	Bachelor of Engineering
Aircraft and Vehicle	Bachelor of Science
Artificial Intelligence	Bachelor of Science
Automotive Engineering	Bachelor of Engineering
Autonomous Vehicle Engineering	Bachelor of Engineering
Bio-Electrical Engineering	Bachelor of Engineering
Business Administration	Bachelor of Arts
Business Information Systems	Bachelor of Science
Computational Life Sciences	Bachelor of Science
Computer Science	Bachelor of Science
Cyber Security	Bachelor of Science
Digital Business	Bachelor of Arts
Electrical Engineering and Electrical Mobility	Bachelor of Engineering
Electrical Engineering and Information Technology	Bachelor of Engineering
Energy Systems and Renewable Energies	Bachelor of Engineering
Engineering and Business	Bachelor of Engineering
Engineering and Management	Bachelor of Engineering
Engineering Sciences	Bachelor of Engineering
Global Economics and Business Management	Bachelor of Arts
International Management	Bachelor of Arts
International Retail Management	Bachelor of Arts
Mechanical Engineering	Bachelor of Engineering
Robotics	Bachelor of Engineering
Technical Design	Bachelor of Science
User Experience Design	Bachelor of Science

=== Regular master's degree programmes ===
The THI offers the following Master's programmes.

All courses, with the exception of the Master's degree course "Applied Research in Engineering Sciences", can also be studied in a dual system.

Course of studies	Degree
Aerospace Engineering	Master of Engineering
Applied Research in Engineering Sciences	Master of Science
Automated Driving and Vehicle Safety	Master of Engineering
Automotive & Mobility Management	Master of Arts
Automotive Engineering	Master of Engineering
Automotive Production Engineering	Master of Engineering
Computer Science	Master of Science
Electrical Engineering for Mobile Systems	Master of Engineering
Engineering and Management	Master of Engineering
Engineering Procurement	Master of Engineering
Financial Management and Controlling	Master of Arts
Global Business	Master of Arts
International Automotive Engineering	Master of Engineering
Marketing/Sales/Media	Master of Arts
Material Science in Engineering	Master of Engineering
Renewable Energy Systems	Master of Engineering
Retail and Consumer Management	Master of Arts
Taxation and Accounting	Master of Arts
Technical Development in Mechanical Engineering	Master of Engineering
User Experience Design	Master of Science

=== Further education programmes ===
The Institut für Akademische Weiterbildung (Institute for Academic Continuing Education, IAW) brings together all continuing education and advanced learning activities of the Technische Hochschule Ingolstadt. The IAW has been system certified as a sub-unit of the THI since December 2015. The institute offers part-time Bachelor, Master and MBA programmes, university certificates and customized programmes for companies. The IAW is also home to the Integration Campus (INCA). This prepares refugees with university entrance qualifications for academic studies and the job market in Germany.

Part-time bachelor's degree programs
Course of studies	Degree
Business Administration	Bachelor of Arts
Digital Business	Bachelor of Arts
Electric Mobility	Bachelor of Engineering
Automotive Engineering	Bachelor of Engineering
Management in Health Professions	Bachelor of Arts
Management in Social Professions	Bachelor of Arts
Industrial Engineering Management	Bachelor of Engineering

Part-time master's degree program
Course of studies	Degree
Procurement Management	Master of Business Administration
Compliance and Corporate Governance	Master of Business Administration
Digital Business Management	Master of Business Administration
Electrical Mobility and Vehicle Electrification	Master of Engineering
Health Management	Master of Business Administration
HR Management	Master of Business Administration
International Business for Engineers	Master of Business Administration
IT Management	Master of Business Administration
Mobility and Innovation Management	Master of Business Administration
Security & Safety Management	Master of Business Administration
Simulation Based Engineering	Master of Engineering
Industrial Engineering Digitization	Master of Science

== Student life ==
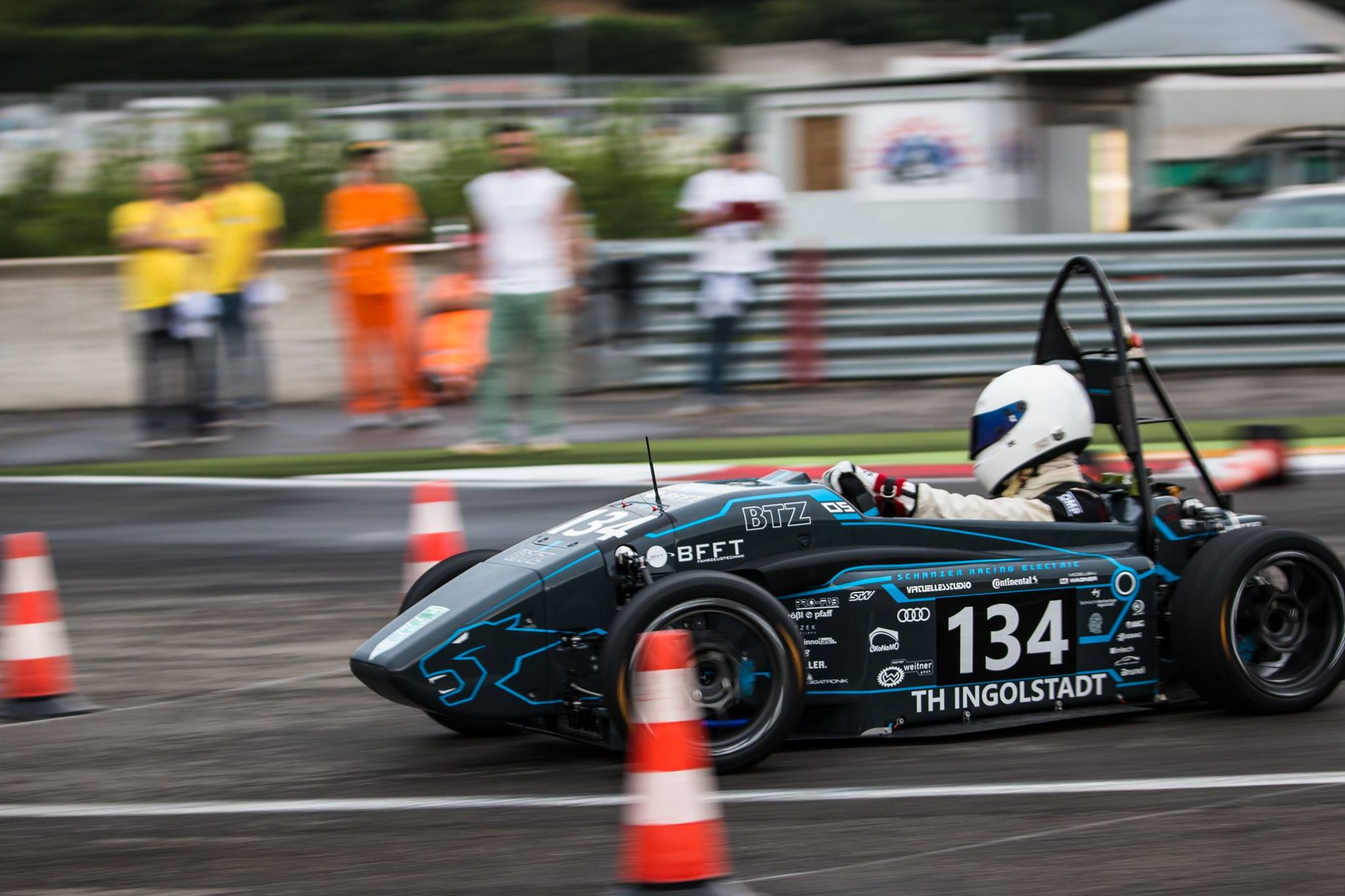
The student club Schanzer Racing Electric e. V. takes part in international races.

There are a number of student clubs at the THI, including:

- Schanzer Racing Electric e. V., a racing team that builds electric racing cars and races internationally
- Students' Life, an association that organizes events for students
- Consult.IN e. V., a student consulting agency
- Eta-nol e. V., an association that develops a hybrid vehicle powered by ethanol and participates in races
- Our Future e. V., a non-profit association that is committed to sustainability
- Neuland Ingolstadt e.V., ein Informatik-Verein
- NEWEXIST, a start-up initiative
- N.I.C.E (Network and International Culture Exchange), a network that supports foreign students at the university
- Mabuhay Philippines Förderverein e. V., an association that initiates donation projects for the underprivileged in the Philippines
- Student Stock Exchange Club Ingolstadt e. V.
- Think - The student newspaper
- UNICEF University Group
- Catholic University Parish

Students on each campus have access to services including a careers advisory service, counselling service, student advice service, disability and service, and chaplaincy.

The StudVe (students' council) is the representative body for students. They are using student feedback to make positive changes to the university that make student life better.

Representatives participate in important university committees: senate, faculty board, convention, and council of representatives.

The student council and a number of students associations organise a variety of activities and events throughout the year. This includes appointment of new lecturers and participation in important university committees, but also the organisation of parties, sports, social entrepreneurship Initiatives, car racing, and media.

== Research and transfer ==
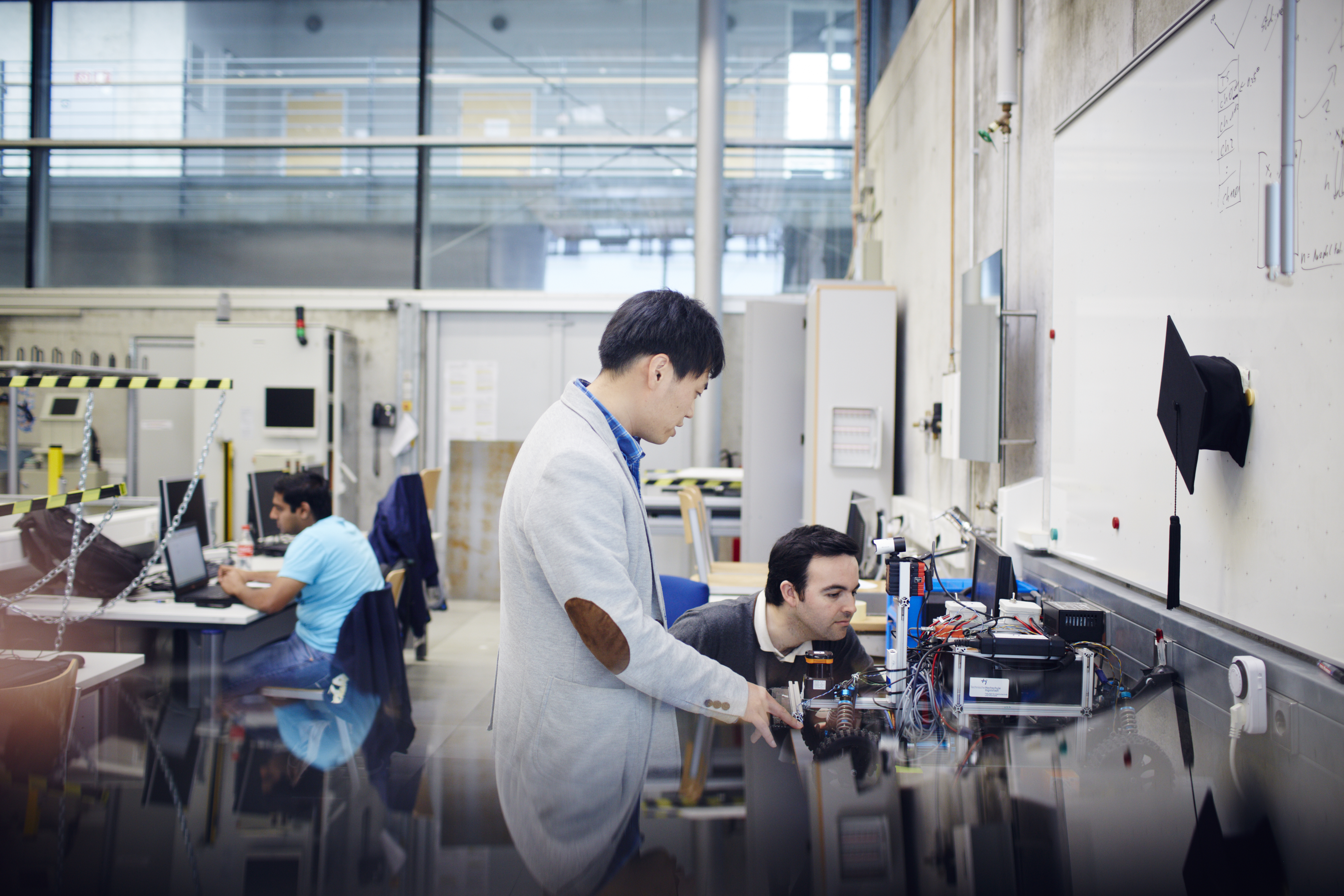
Research at the THI

Technische Hochschule Ingolstadt is one of the strongest research universities in the field of applied science universities in Germany. The university has a research volume of around 22 million euros per year. This volume corresponds to about one third of the university's budget and has almost tripled in the last four years, as of 2020.

Research at THI is organised in seven internal research institutes - CARISSMA (C-IAD, C-ISAFE, C-ECOS), AImotion Bavaria, Institute for Innovative Mobility (IIMo) Institute for New Energy Systems (InES) and Research and Transfer Centre Sustainability Neuburg (ForTraNN). In addition, the university works closely with the three affiliated institutes AININ, Fraunhofer Anwendungszentrum and INAS.

The three research institutes CARISSMA, the Institute for Innovative Mobility and the Institute for New Energy Systems are features in the HRK Research Map, which presents key research priorities of German universities.

=== AI Mobility Node and Artificial Intelligence Network Ingolstadt (AININ) ===
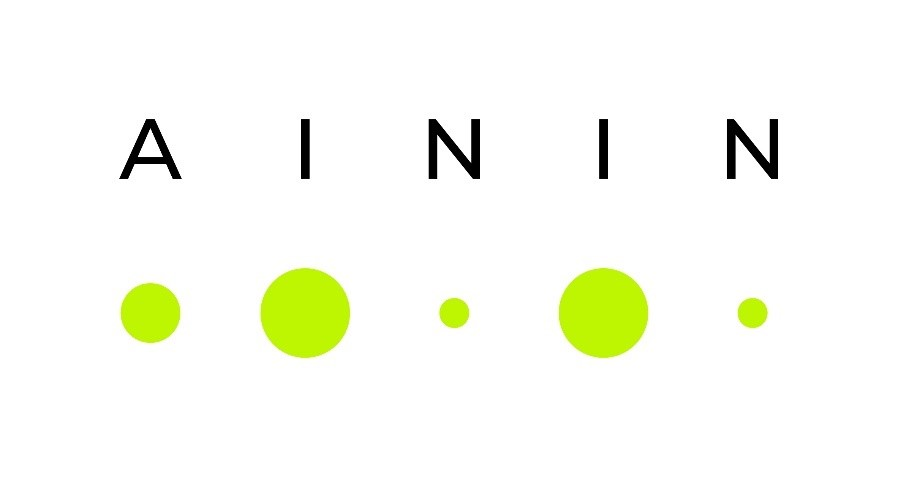
Logo AININ

Thematic cluster in the AI mobility node Technische Hochschule Ingolstadt was named a mobility node in the Bavarian network for artificial intelligence in October 2019 in a government declaration by Bavarian Minister-President Markus Söder. The other nodes, Data Science, Health and Intelligent Robotics, are located in Munich, Würzburg and Erlangen at the local universities.

As a node, THI is responsible for coordinating research on AI mobility in Bavaria and receives additional funds for personnel and AI mobility research. The THI focuses on the topics of autonomous driving, unmanned flight and automobile production.

The activities of the AI mobility node are pooled in the Research Centre for Artificial Intelligence and Machine Learning AININ (Artificial Intelligence Network Ingolstadt), which was founded at THI in April 2019. In addition to mobility, AININ is also researching the application of AI in the areas of trade, health and production.

AININ brings together seven partners from science, business and society: The Technische Hochschule Ingolstadt, the Catholic University of Eichstätt-Ingolstadt, the Fraunhofer-Gesellschaft, the city of Ingolstadt, the Klinikum Ingolstadt, AUDI AG and the MediaMarktSaturn Retail Group. The different perspectives from science, business and society are designed to promote interdisciplinary approaches and ensure that AI solutions from one subject area can be quickly transferred to other areas. The aim is to transform research results into socially relevant products and production methods and into new companies.

=== CARISSMA Research and Testing Center ===
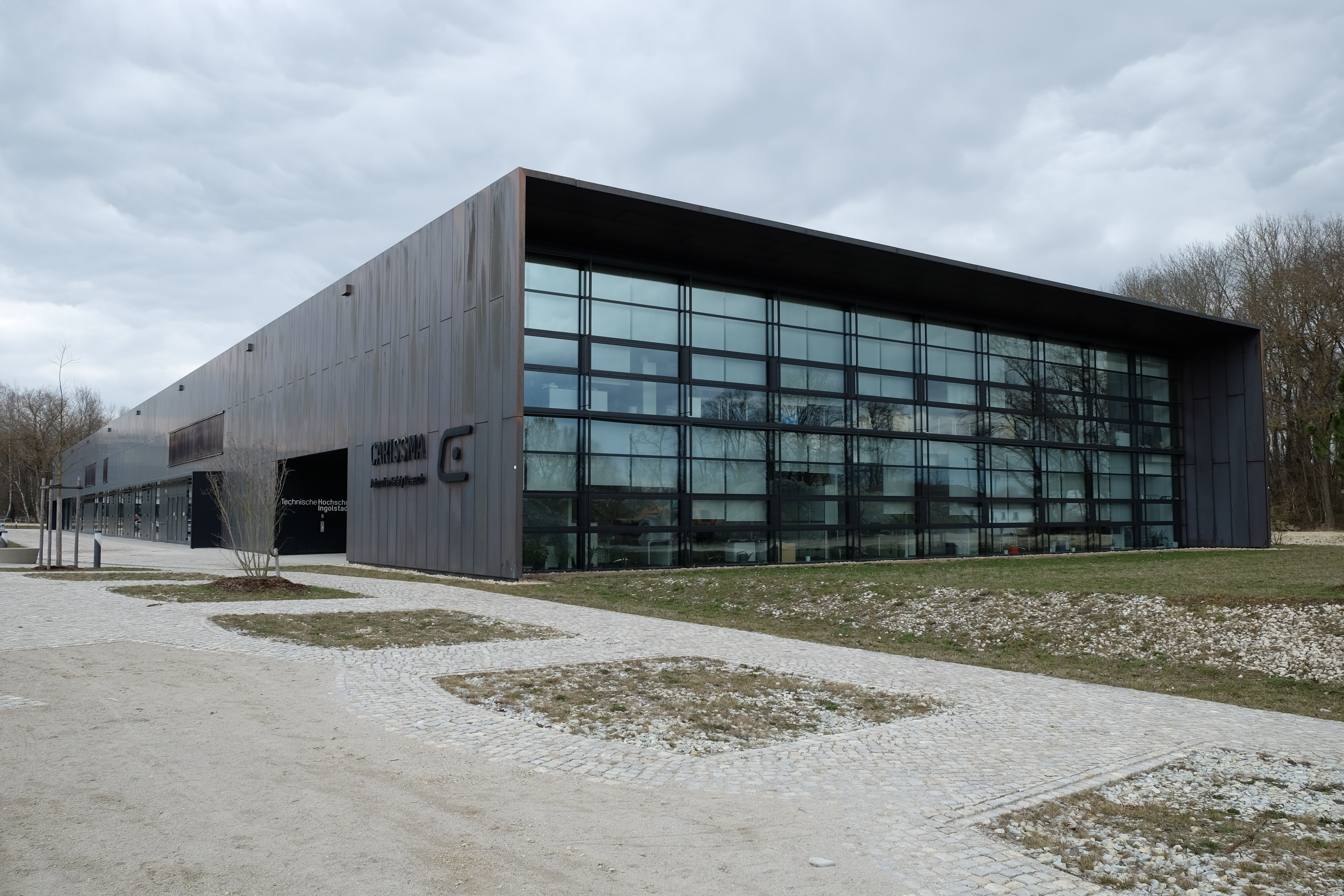
The CARISSMA Research and Testing Center

The THI is home to CARISSMA (Center of Automotive Research on Integrated Safety Systems and Measurement Area), Germany's first research facility at a university of applied sciences. The more than 120-metre-long building has been in use since 2016 and accommodates a total of ten testing facilities, including an indoor testing facility for collision tests and technical trials, a drop tower, a laboratory for Car2X-communication and a virtual simulation laboratory. There is also an outdoor testing area for complete vehicle testing as well as a driving simulator with a Hexapod motion platform and a pedestrian safety laboratory. CARISSMA researches for Vision Zero, the European Union's vision of zero road fatalities, in the fields of passive safety, integrated safety, testing systems and safe electric mobility. Through the close networking and integration of different fields of technology, CARISSMA is intended to provide a global safety system in the future.

=== Institute of Innovative Mobility ===
In the Institut für Innovative Mobilität (Institute for Innovative Mobility, IIMo), propulsion systems and energy consumption of road vehicles are optimized in terms of energy efficiency and customer benefit. The research areas of the IIMo are electrical mobility and adaptive systems, interconnection technologies, power electronics and motor and drive train. In addition to innovative functionality developments and operating strategies, the topics of networked mobility, Industry 4.0 and Smart City are increasingly being incorporated into the projects.

=== Institute for New Energy Systems (InES) ===
Since 2000, THI's research activities on renewable energies have been bundled at the Institut für neue Energie-Systeme (Institute for New Energy Systems, InES).

The application-oriented research at InES is mainly carried out in cooperation with medium-sized industrial partners as well as research institutes and partner universities. Furthermore, InES is active in several national and international research associations. Scientists of the institute are represented in a variety of national and international committees and advisory boards.

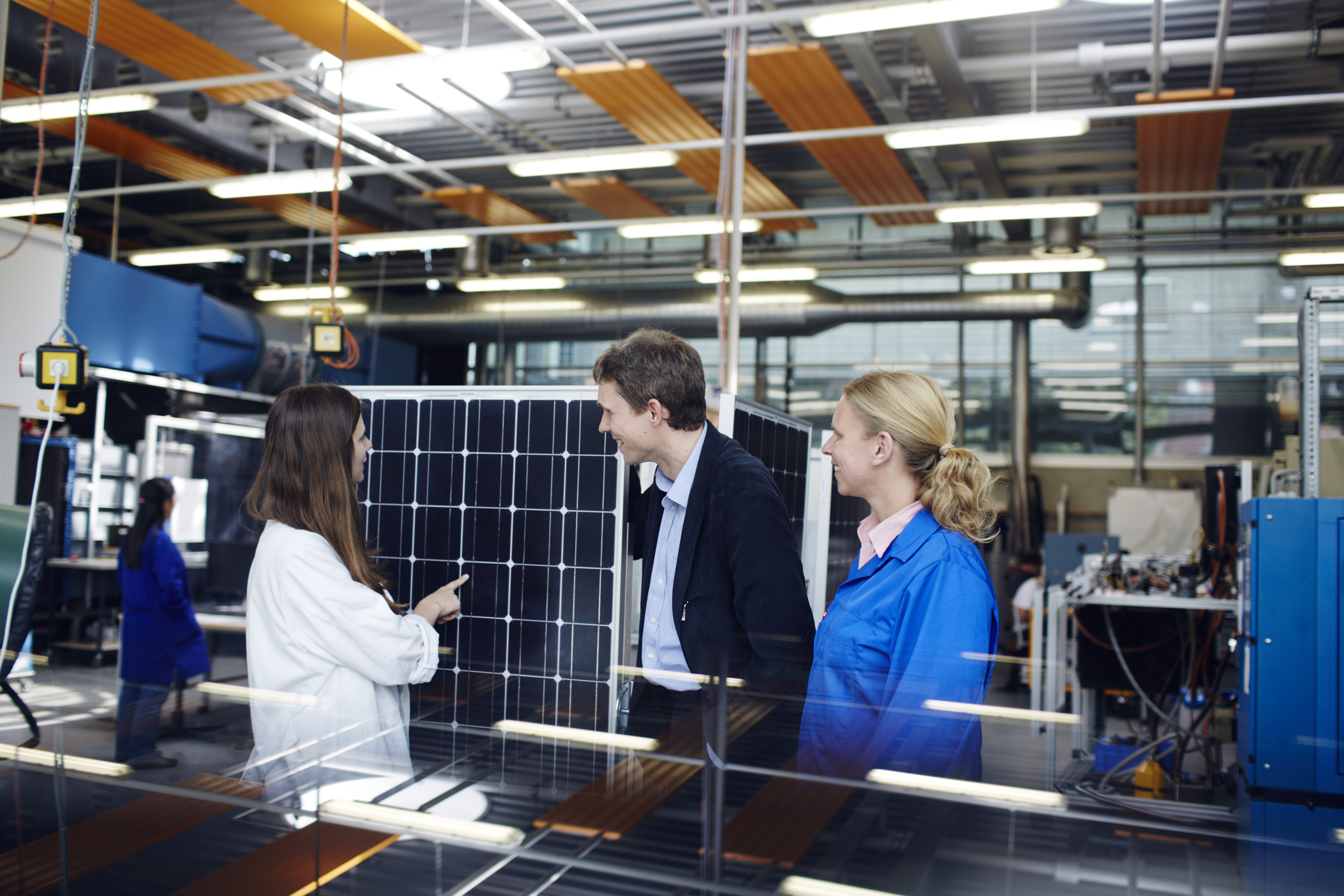
The Institute for New Energy Systems (InES)

=== Fraunhofer Application Center for Integrated Mobility and Infrastructure ===
The Fraunhofer-Anwendungszentrum für Vernetzte Mobilität und Infrastruktur (Fraunhofer Application Center for Integrated Mobility and Infrastructure), which opened in March 2020 and is based at the THI. It conducts research on sensor technology, communication (vehicle-to-x communication) and artificial intelligence in the fields of highly automated driving, integrated traffic systems, traffic safety, efficient use of energy resources, and utilization of existing traffic infrastructures. The Ingolstadt Fraunhofer Application Center is closely linked to the Fraunhofer research landscape in Bavaria. The Fraunhofer Application Center is affiliated technically with the Fraunhofer-Anwendungszentrum an das Fraunhofer Institut für Verkehrs- und Infrastruktursysteme IVI (Fraunhofer Institute for Transportation and Infrastructure Systems IVI) in Dresden.

=== Institute for Applied Sustainability (inas) ===
Since June 2019, the Institut für angewandte Nachhaltigkeit (Institute for Applied Sustainability, inas) has been an affiliated institute of the THI and the Catholic University of Eichstätt-Ingolstadt. The institute's goal is to promote research and teaching for sustainable development in the Region 10 and to encourage people to adopt sustainable living models. The inas was founded in 2017 on the initiative of THI Honorary Professor Reinhard Büchl.

=== Graduate Center ===
The Graduate Centre was established in 2013 with the aim of promoting and networking young scientists and scholars, as well as ensuring and developing quality standards for the doctorate programme. The Graduate Centre enables a cooperative doctorate at the THI with a university in Germany or abroad. The THI is also integrated into the Bavarian Science Forum BayWISS, through which cooperative doctoral studies with other Bavarian universities are possible. In BayWISS, the THI coordinates the "Mobility and Transport" collaborative college together with the Technical University of Munich.
