= Bryn Mawr College Deanery =

Building in Bryn Mawr, Pennsylvania, United States

Coordinates: 40.027328°N 75.314654°W

The Bryn Mawr College Deanery
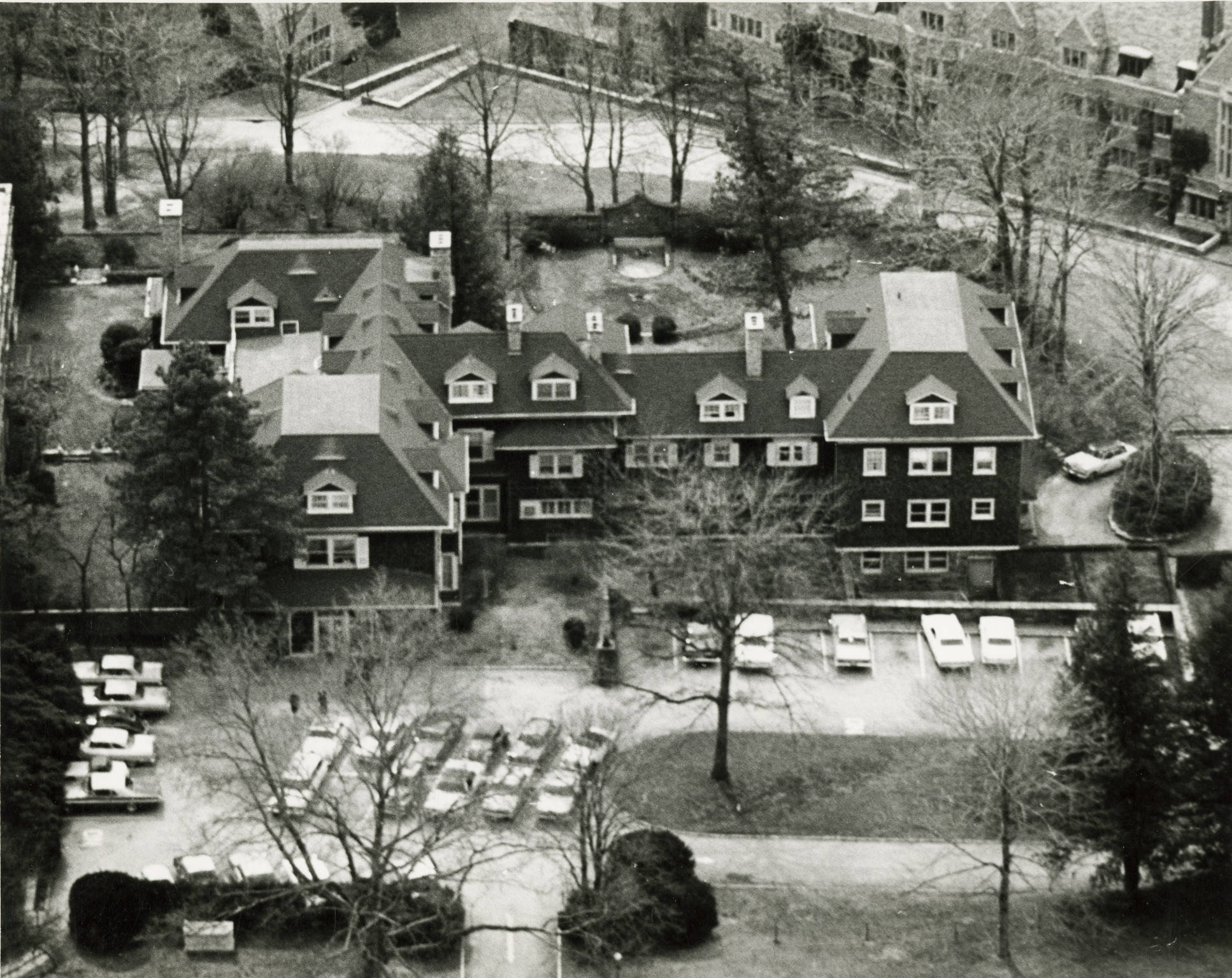
- Aerial view, ca. 1960s
- Interactive map of the The Bryn Mawr College Deanery area

General information
- Status: Demolished
- Location: Bryn Mawr College, Bryn Mawr, Pennsylvania, United States
- Renovated: 1888; 1894–1896; 1908–1909
- Demolished: spring 1968

Renovating team
- Renovating firm: Cope & Stewardson (1894–1896); Archer & Allen (1908–1909)
- Other designers: Lockwood de Forest; Henry Chapman Mercer

Other information
- Number of rooms: 46

The Bryn Mawr College Deanery was the campus residence of the first Dean and second President of Bryn Mawr College, Martha Carey Thomas, who maintained a home there from 1885 to 1933. Under the direction of Thomas, the Deanery was greatly enlarged and lavishly decorated for entertaining the college's important guests, students, and alumnae, as well as Thomas' own immediate family and friends. From its origins as a modest five room Victorian cottage, the Deanery grew into a sprawling forty-six room mansion which included design features from several notable 19th and 20th century artists. The interior was elaborately decorated with the assistance of the American artist Lockwood de Forest and Louis Comfort Tiffany, de Forest's partner in the design firm Tiffany & de Forest, supplied a number of light fixtures of Tiffany glass. De Forest's design of the Deanery's so-called 'Blue Room' is particularly important as it is often considered one of the best American examples of an Aesthetic Movement interior, alongside the Peacock Room by James Abbott McNeill Whistler. In addition, John Charles Olmsted, of the Olmsted Brothers landscape design firm, designed a garden adjacent to the Deanery, which also contained imported works of art from Syria, China, and Italy. The Deanery's beauty and rich history established the Deanery as a cherished space on campus and an icon of Bryn Mawr College.

From 1933 until 1968, the Deanery served as the Alumnae House for Bryn Mawr College. The building was demolished in the spring of 1968 to make space for the construction of Canaday Library, which stands on the site today. At the time of its demolition, many of the Deanery's furnishings were re-located to Wyndham, an 18th-century farmhouse (with several later additions) which became the college's new Alumnae House.

== M. Carey Thomas, resident ==
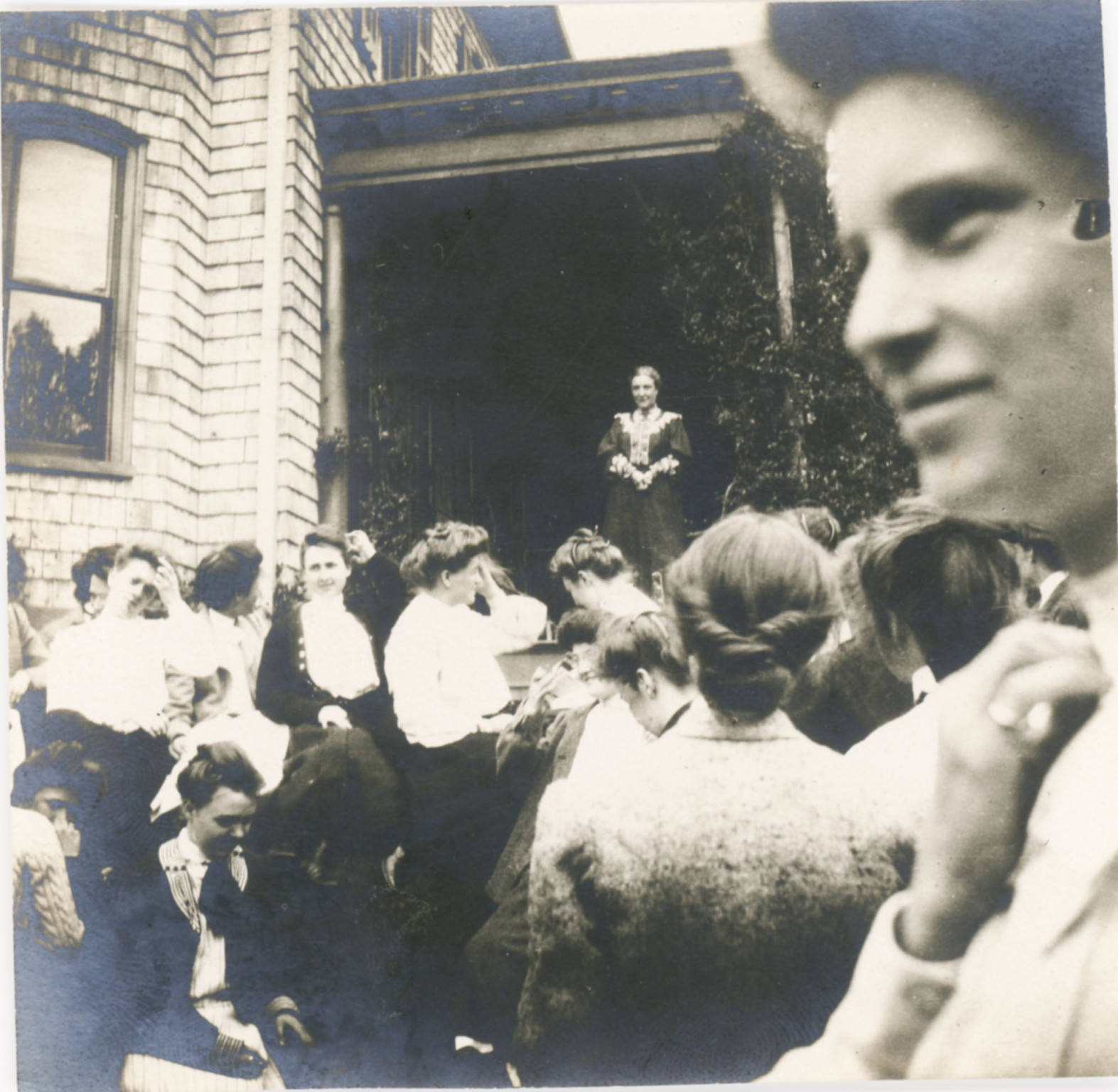
M. Carey Thomas standing on the Deanery veranda and addressing students, 1905

After she was appointed Dean and Professor of English, M. Carey Thomas took up residence at Bryn Mawr College in 1885 in the small five-room house which would become known as the "Deanery." She had earned her undergraduate degree from Sage College, the women's school at Cornell University, and a Ph.D. in linguistics from the University of Zurich at a time when women's opportunities in higher education were quite restricted. An advocate for women's education, Thomas played an active role in the planning of the college's organization and academic curriculum. In 1894, she was elected its second president, a position which she held until her retirement in 1922. In her forty-eight years at Bryn Mawr College Thomas continued to maintain a home in the Deanery, overseeing several expansions and renovations, as well as decorating the interior with items collected from her international travels. In 1933, she arranged for the Deanery and its furnishings to be turned over to the college for use as an alumnae house. She died two years later at the age of seventy-eight.

=== Mary Gwinn and Mary Elizabeth Garrett ===
Mary (Mamie) Gwinn and Mary Elizabeth Garrett were intimate friends of M. Carey Thomas who, at different times, lived with Thomas at the Deanery and contributed to its enhancement. Thomas was introduced to Gwinn and Garrett by a close friend, Bessie King, during her time at Cornell. When Thomas returned to Baltimore, she became close friends with both Gwinn and Garrett, and together with Bessie King and Julia Rodgers the group of five women created the Friday Evening Club, which met every second Friday to write and discuss matters of love and life. These friendships developed into long, loving partnerships, in which Gwinn and Garrett lived, studied, and traveled with Thomas. Gwinn accompanied Thomas to the University of Zurich and later lived with Thomas in the Deanery at Bryn Mawr College. Gwinn even received a degree in English and assumed a professorship in the department of English at Bryn Mawr. Eventually, however, the relationship between Gwinn and Thomas deteriorated as Thomas began an intimate friendship with Mary Garrett, who had long rejected Thomas' interest. Thomas' relationship with the two women was already strained when Gwinn shifted her affection to Alfred Hodder, a fellow Professor of English at Bryn Mawr College. In the summer of 1904, Gwinn and Hodder married and Gwinn left the Deanery and Bryn Mawr to live with her new husband in New York.

After the marriage of Mamie Gwinn to Alfred Hodder, Mary Garrett moved into the Deanery, where she resided until her death in 1915. Garrett was the daughter of John W. Garrett, the wealthy president of the B&O Railroad, and she used her financial resources to help the fledgling Bryn Mawr College in a variety of ways, including extensive renovations to the Deanery building. The two large renovations of the Deanery, in 1894–1896 and 1908–1909, and the decoration of the interior were largely financed through Garrett. In addition, Thomas and Garrett decorated the interior and garden of the Deanery with art that they collected during their many travels from all over the world, such as the pair of stone dogs from a Mandarin's palace in Manchuria and inlaid tables from Damascus.

== History ==
=== Early years ===
When Joseph W. Taylor purchased 40 acres of land for the campus of Bryn Mawr College in 1878, three Victorian cottages were located on the property, later known as the Deanery, the Betweenery, and the Greenery. In 1885, M. Carey Thomas moved into the Deanery, a modest building of five rooms situated downhill and approximately 100 meters (330 feet) to the west of what was then the central campus building, Taylor Hall. The residence underwent a minor expansion in 1888 – the first of three renovations – when two small rooms were added to the rear of the house for the storage of books and records.

=== 1894–1896 Renovation ===
In 1894, the college architect Walter Cope drew up plans for a second expansion of the Deanery at the request of M. Carey Thomas, shortly after she was appointed to the college Presidency. The Philadelphia firm of Cope and Stewardson had been commissioned to design and construct several campus buildings in the 1880s and 90s, including the dormitories Radnor (1885) and Denbigh (1891). The Deanery expansion, which was largely funded by Mary Garrett, was intended to transform the Deanery into a home befitting Thomas's new presidential status, fitting into Thomas's larger vision for the expansion of the campus.

The renovation completed in 1896 made four major changes to the existing building. The house was re-oriented away from its existing veranda, and a new entrance facing campus replaced the existing entrance. On the second floor, a library and guest bedrooms were created, and a third floor was added, containing more guest rooms and the servants' quarters. A large northwest wing was also added to the existing house, located off of the original dining room and containing the kitchen, pantry, and storage areas.

=== 1908–1909 Renovation ===
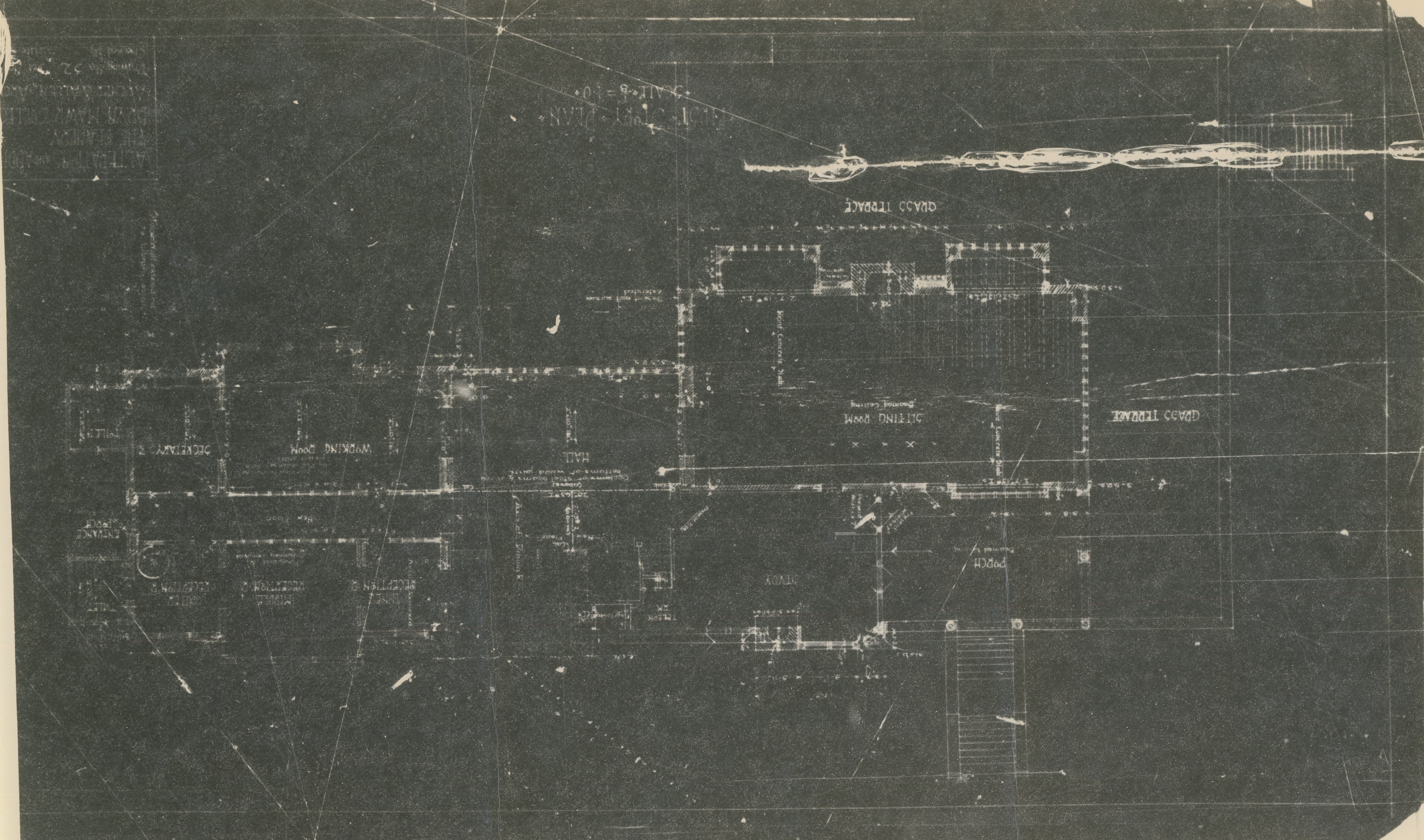
Archer & Allen blueprint, 1908

In 1907, Mary Garrett decided to fund another major renovation project to expand the Deanery for a third time. The plans were drawn up by the architectural firm of Archer and Allen, with Lockwood de Forest as consultant. The expansion began in 1908 and took nearly two years and $100,000 to complete.

This third expansion and renovation of the Deanery continued to build upon the previous alterations. The northwest wing was again extended to accommodate additional kitchen and storage facilities and more storage space was added on the third floor. In addition, Mamie Gwinn's bedroom on the second floor was transformed into Garrett's very large bedroom with an elaborate bath.

When completed, the Deanery had been transformed from its origins as a simple Victorian cottage into a sprawling, 46-room mansion. It was an elegant residence where M. Carey Thomas could entertain the college's important guests, students, and alumnae, as well as her own immediate family and friends.

=== Alumnae House and demolition ===
M. Carey Thomas convinced the Board of Trustees to give control of the Deanery and its property, which technically belonged to the college, to the Alumnae Association, pursuant to the same conditions on which she herself had held it. The contents of the house, with the exception of her personal belongings, some furniture and books, and a few valued treasures, Thomas gave to the trustees, who held them in trust for use in the alumnae house. Operation of the house was overseen by alumnae organized into a newly formed Deanery Committee.

The Deanery building was demolished in 1968 to make space for a new library building. It was thought that the new library should be located near the center of campus, and that the location of the Deanery was the only space large enough to expand. Furthermore, it was becoming expensive to maintain such an old, and potentially unsafe, building. A publication from the Bryn Mawr College Campus Heritage Initiative in 2004 reflected that despite the iconic status of the Deanery at Bryn Mawr, the "loss of the Deanery was probably inevitable," due to its structural problems. The garden, however, was spared and remains today behind the new Mariam Coffin Canaday Library. At the time of its demolition, many of the Deanery's furnishings were re-located to Wyndham, an 18th-century farmhouse (with several later additions) which became the college's new Alumnae House. In addition, two of the favorite rooms from the building, the Dorothy Vernon Room and the Blue Room, were considered for dismantling and reconstruction elsewhere on campus. While the Dorothy Vernon room was partially reconstructed in the new Haffner Hall in 1971, it appears that the only remains of the Blue Room are its furniture in Wyndham.

== Decoration ==
=== Lockwood de Forest ===
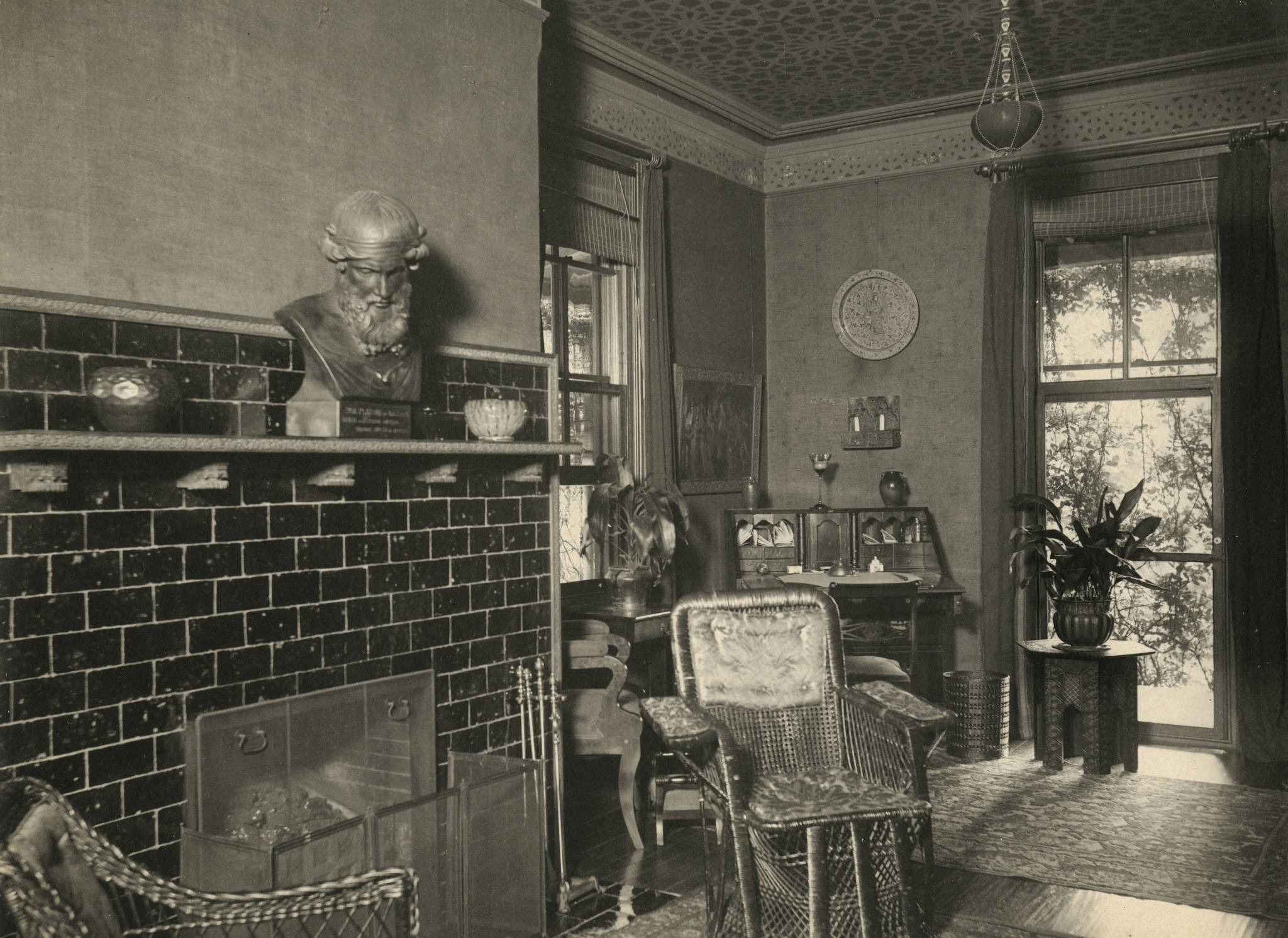
Stenciling on the ceiling and walls of Mamie Gwinn's study by Lockwood de Forest

The design and decoration of many of the Deanery's interior spaces was entrusted, in large part, to the American artist Lockwood de Forest. A student of the landscape painter Frederic Church, de Forest enjoyed moderate success as an artist, exhibiting his work at a variety of venues including the National Academy of Design in New York. De Forest made his living, however, as a designer and an importer of exotic goods. In 1880, he and Louis Comfort Tiffany established the firm of Tiffany & de Forest, which focused largely on the importation of East Indian decorative arts. By 1883, de Forest had set up his own import business, based in New York City, which distributed carved teakwood furniture, tracery panels, jewelry, and textiles, some of which were produced in his workshop in Ahmedabad, India. For the second and third renovations of the Deanery in 1894–1896 and 1908–1909, M. Carey Thomas consulted de Forest for the design and decoration of the Deanery's interior. De Forest's hand is clearly detectable through his incorporation of East Indian materials and designs, as well as Tiffany glass.

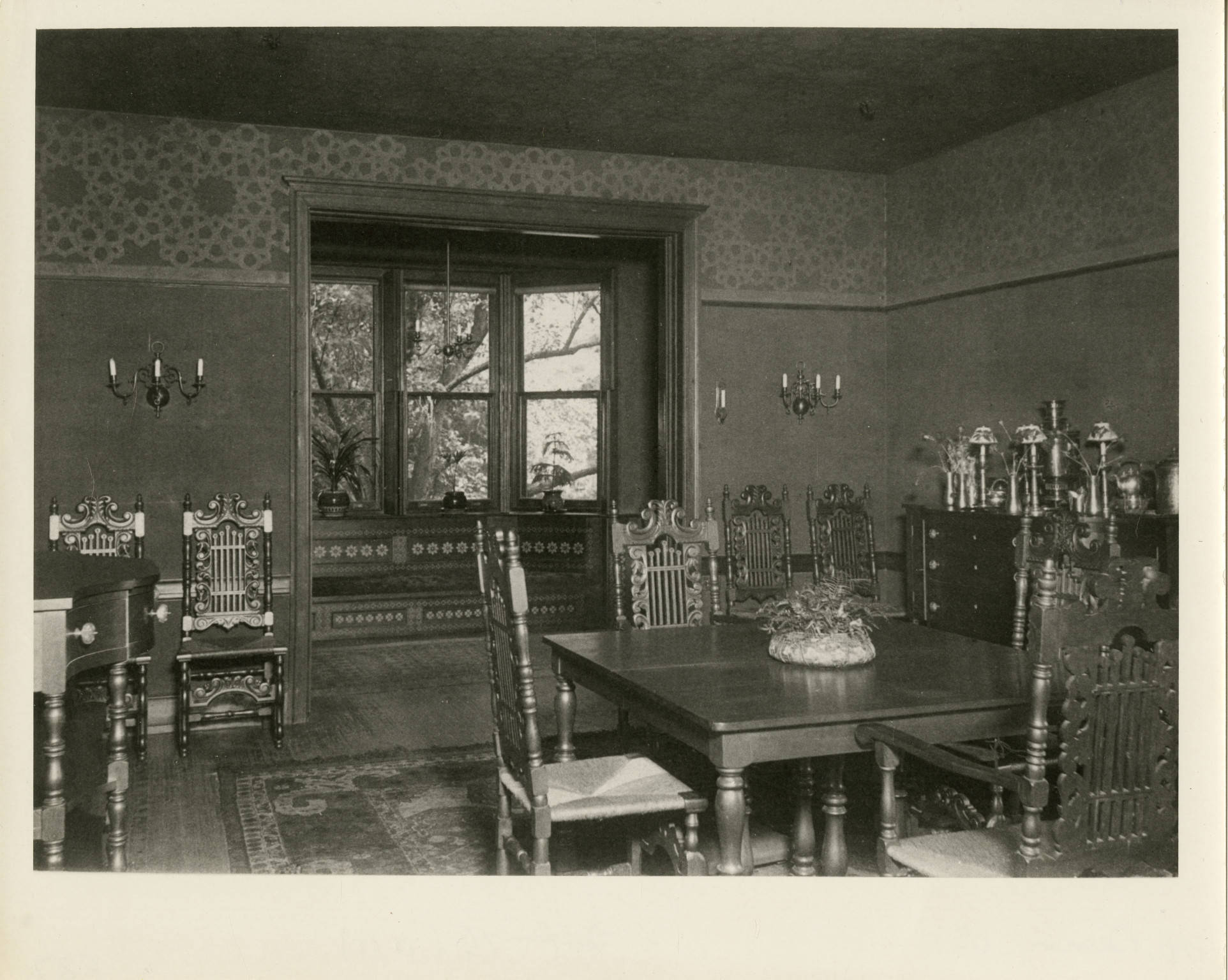
Stenciling in Dining Room by Lockwood de Forest

The most perceptible element of de Forest's design aesthetic in the Deanery is his stenciling, a technique for which his Indian workshop was known. Geometric designs were stenciled on the walls or on the ceilings throughout the house, as, for example, on the ceiling of the Blue Room, as an upper border in the dining room, a mid-height border in the corridor between the studies, and as an upper border and on the ceiling in Mamie Gwinn's study. Even the floors of the dining room were stenciled, as Thomas noted in a letter to de Forest: "You remember it was so with my dining room. In four years the stenciling under the wax which we put on the floors was entirely worn off." Several pieces of furniture were also transformed into "art furniture" by the addition of stenciled designs, possibly as a cost-saving measure, as the 1894–1896 renovations cost over $14,000.

In addition to the stenciling, de Forest's touch can be seen in the incorporation of other Eastern designs and Tiffany glass. De Forest used carved teakwood, like that produced by the Ahmedabad Woodcarving Company, in the molding along the outer edge of the fireplace in Mamie Gwinn's study, as well as some picture frames in the corridor between her and Thomas's study (the Blue Room). In the third expansion of the house in 1908, de Forest decorated the ceiling of the Dorothy Vernon Room with thin sheets of patterned brass in a variety of East Indian designs. Several of the rooms also included Tiffany glass lamps or fixtures that were designed by de Forest and created in the Tiffany Studios.

=== The Blue Room ===
In the 1894–1896 renovations to the Deanery, Lockwood de Forest transformed the original living room into a study for M. Carey Thomas, which came to be known as the "Blue Room," referring to the room's dark blue walls. The decoration of the Blue Room was inspired by Japanese art, a departure from the East Indian influence that permeates the majority of de Forest's designs in the Deanery. The celebrated gold designs that de Forest stenciled on the ceiling were reminiscent of Japanese textiles, and the spiked flowers of the Japanese pagoda tree were the model for the stencil designs on the sofa and daybed. Throughout the Blue Room a number of small works of art were also on display, including etchings by the nineteenth-century artists James Abbott McNeill Whistler and Charles Méryon, and a fifteenth-century bronze bust of Dante Alighieri.

The Deanery's Blue Room is often considered one of the best American examples of an Aesthetic Movement interior, alongside The Peacock Room by James Abbott McNeill Whistler, now located in the Freer Gallery of Art in Washington, D.C.

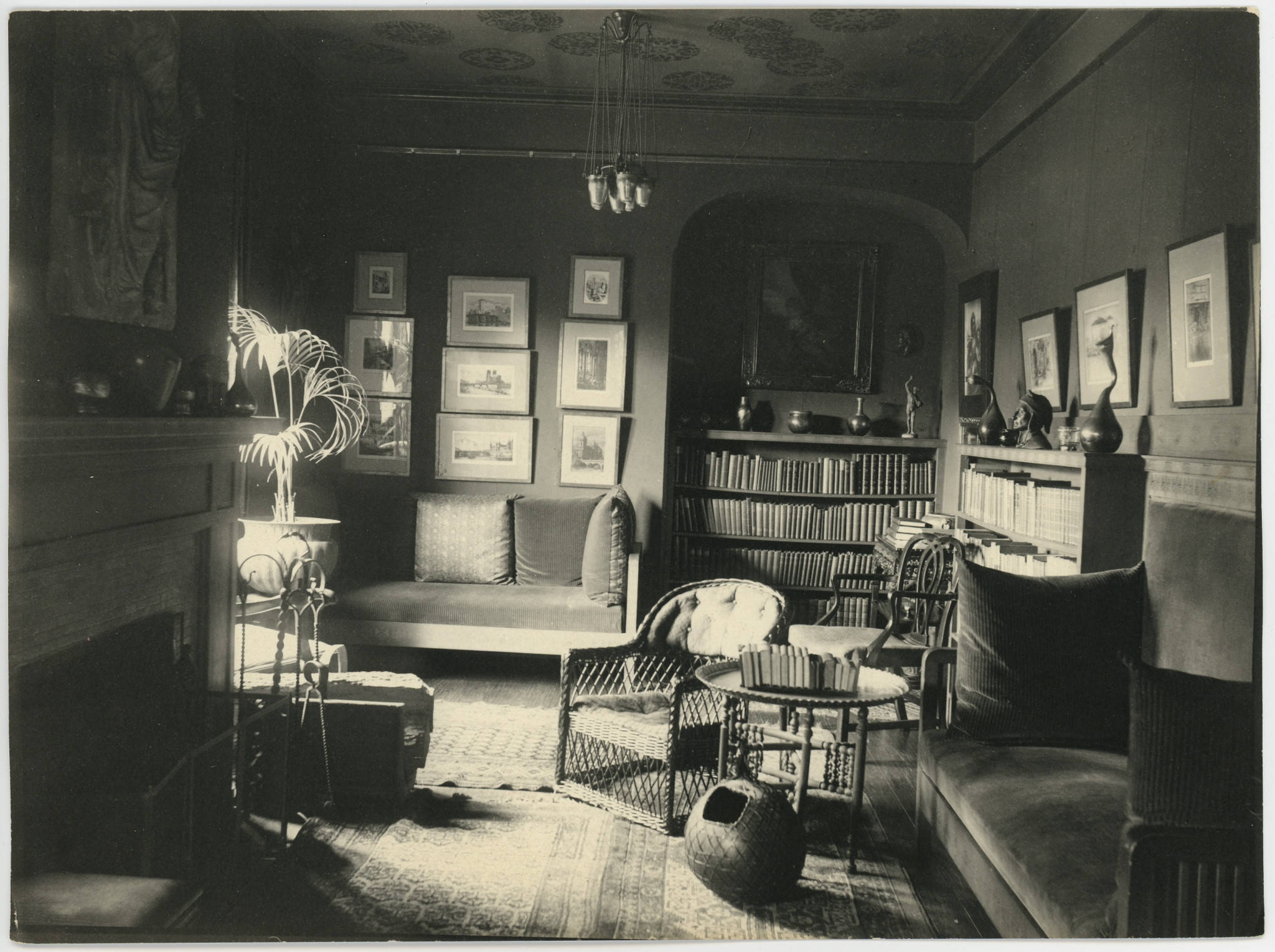
M. Carey Thomas' Study ("The Blue Room"), 1904.

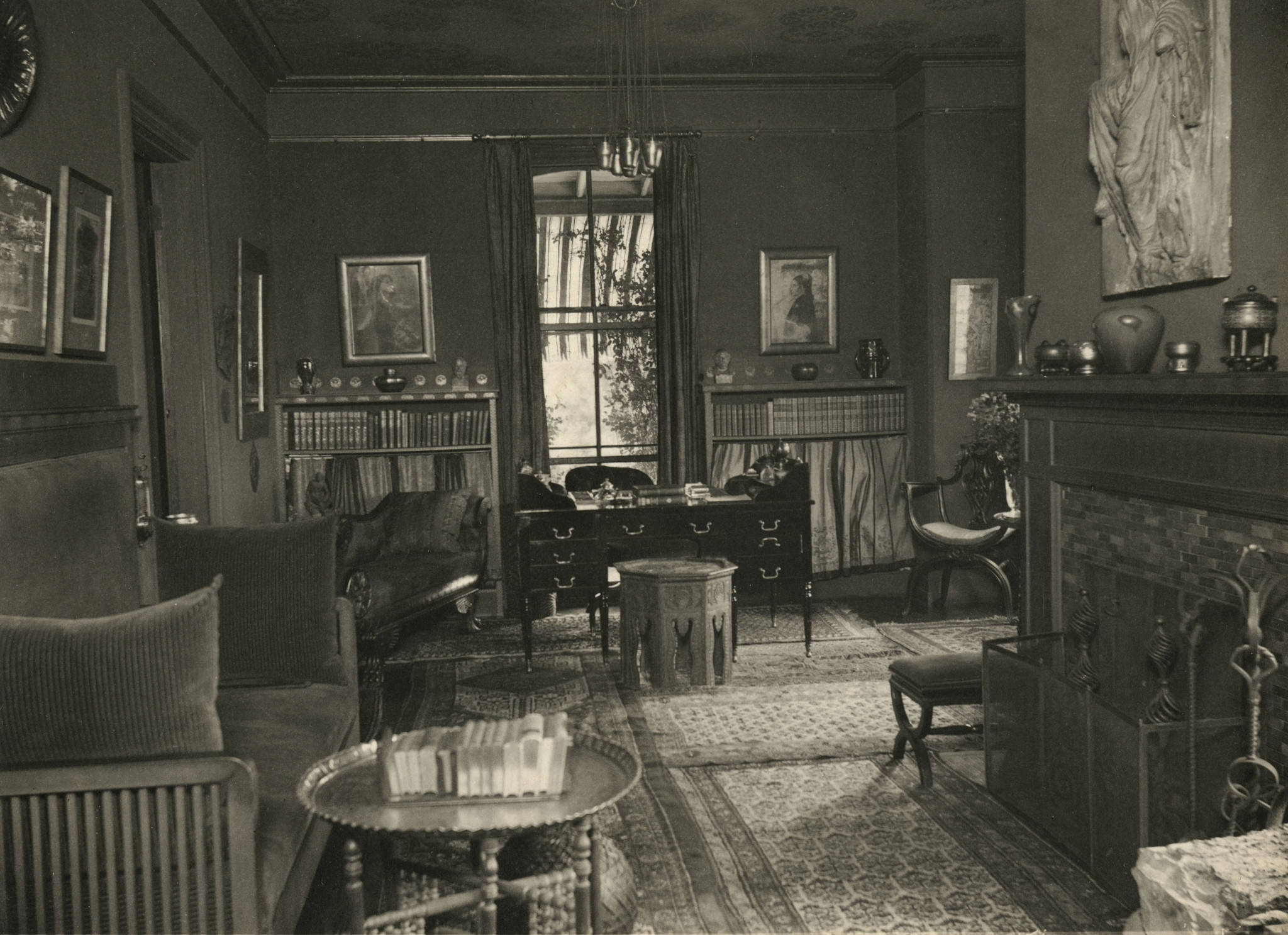
The Blue Room, 1904

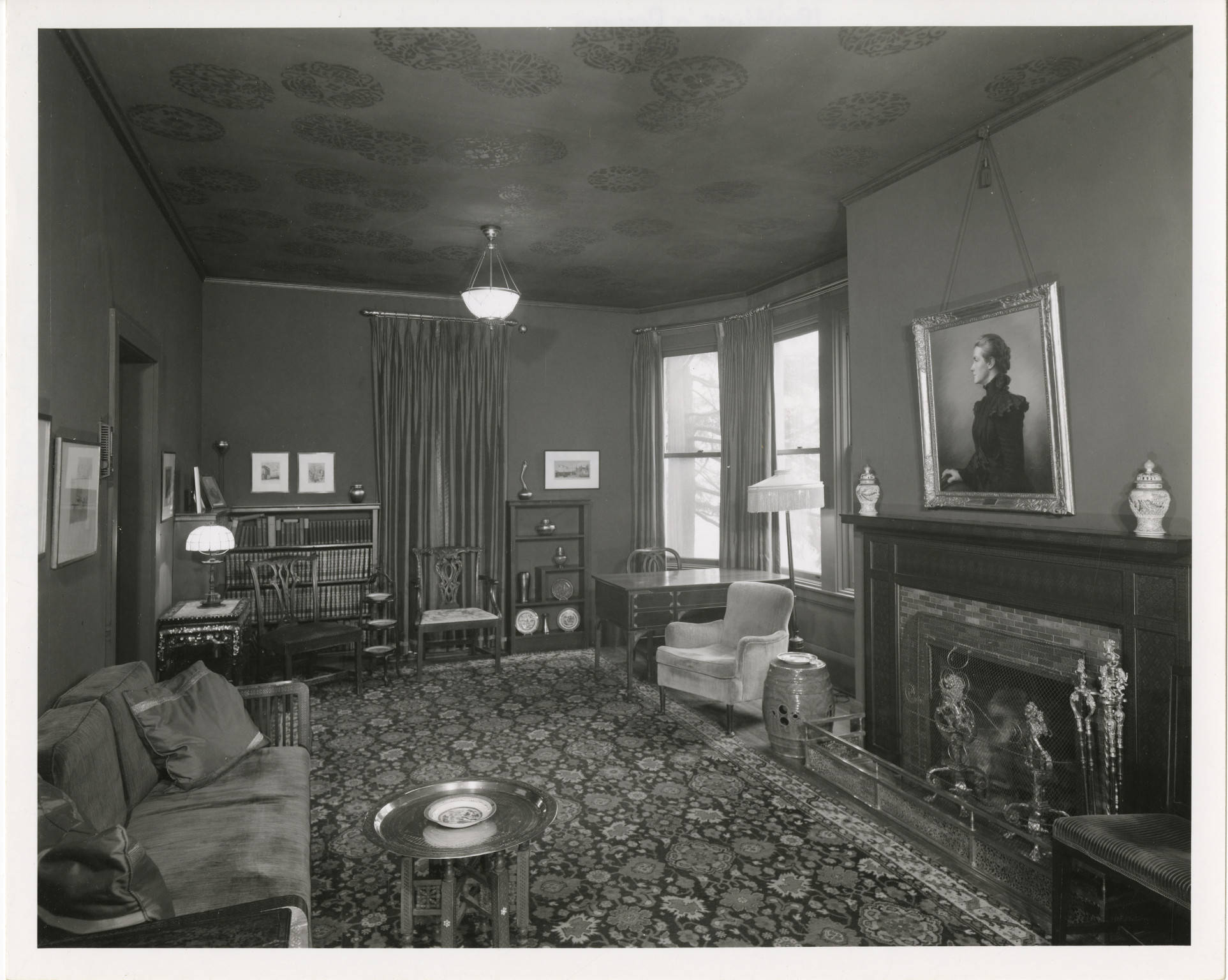
The Blue Room, 1965

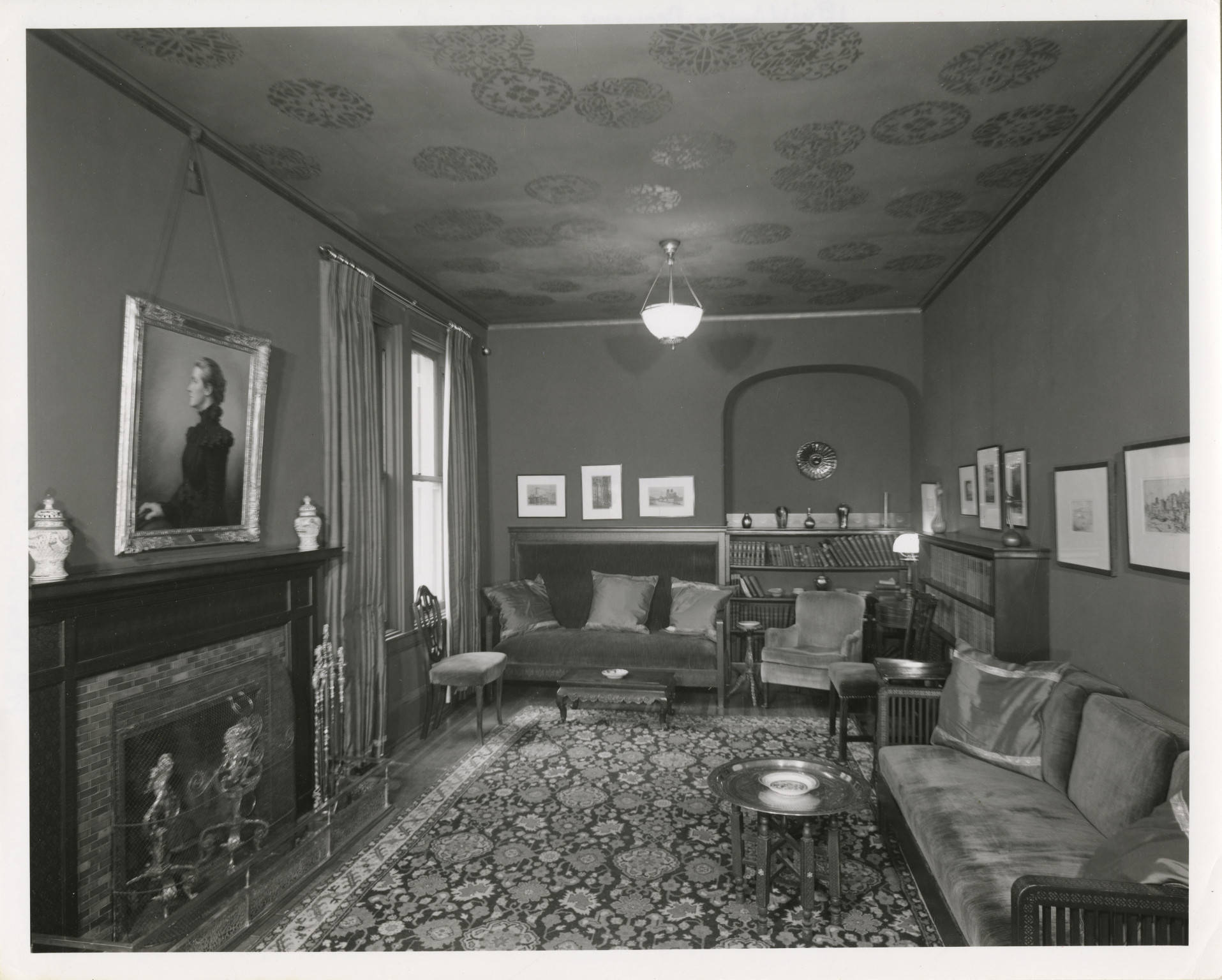
The Blue Room, 1965

=== Furnishings from Baltimore ===
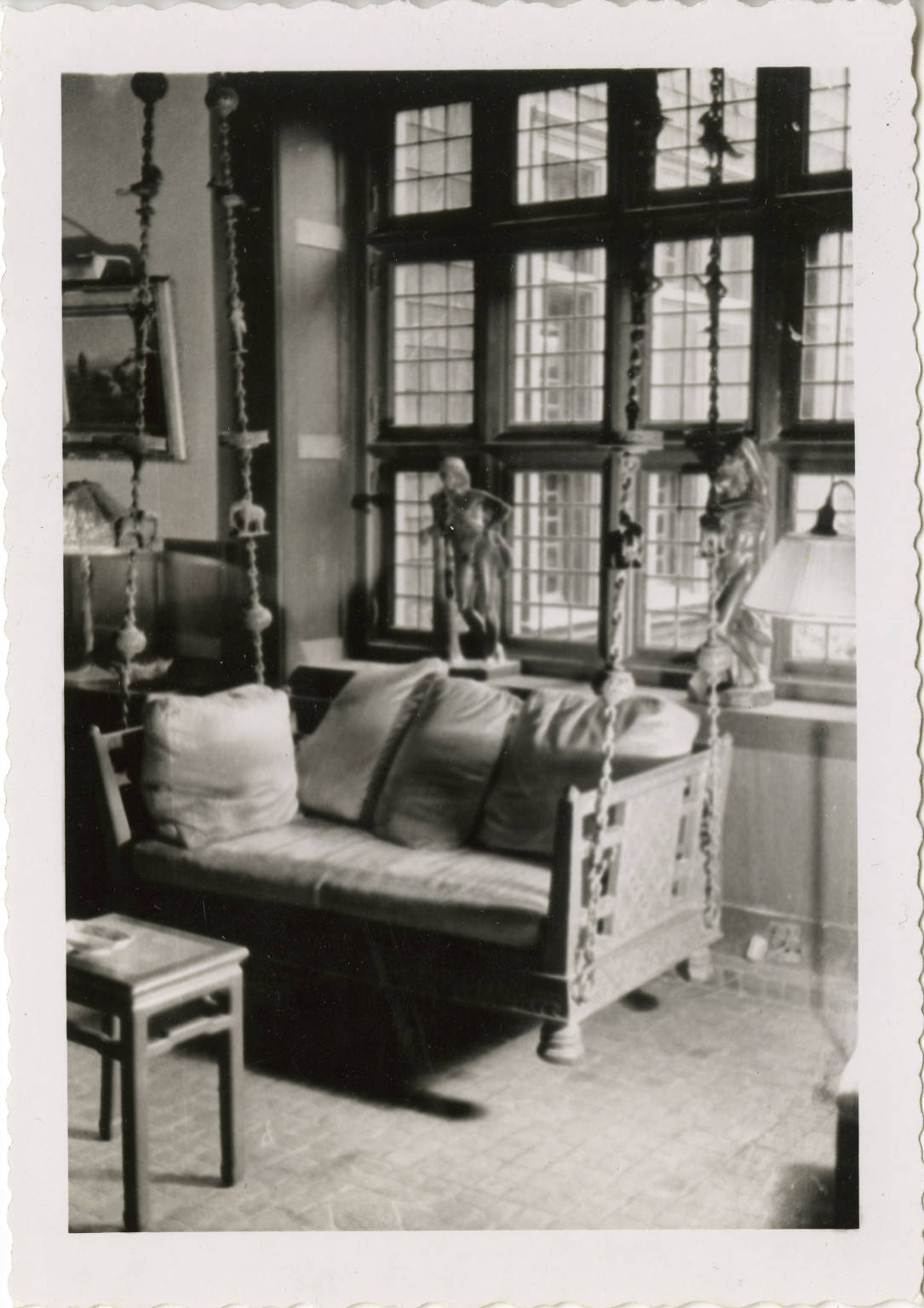
Swing Settee, designed by Lockwood de Forest. Originally installed in Mary Garrett's Baltimore home and moved to the Dorothy Vernon Room in the Deanery

In 1904 Mary Garrett moved into the Deanery with M. Carey Thomas and brought with her art and furnishings from her home at 101 Monument Street in Baltimore. In addition to linens, silver, and works of art, Garrett relocated with a selection of furniture, some of which was designed by Lockwood de Forest. Garrett was acquainted with de Forest by 1885 at the earliest and had hired him to decorate portions of her home in Baltimore.

Photographs from before Garrett moved into the Deanery in 1904, and after de Forest's redecoration of the house in 1894–1896, show only a fraction of the known pieces by de Forest in Bryn Mawr's collection from the Deanery. The absence of the furniture in these photographs, in addition to shipping labels still attached to several pieces indicating Garrett as the sender and the Deanery as the final destination, support the idea that the majority of the de Forest furniture was originally from Garrett's Baltimore home. Furthermore, if the furniture was from this earlier period, then it is likely that it was produced in de Forest's workshop in Ahmedabad, India. The swing-settee, which was later installed in the Dorothy Vernon room, is one of the most recognizable pieces of de Forest to have come from Garrett's Baltimore home.

In addition to the furniture created by de Forest, Garrett also brought a set of 19th century cherry furniture with starfish, moon, and flower (or star) motifs that included two wardrobes, several cupboards, a set of side chairs and a washstand.

=== The Dorothy Vernon Room ===
As part of the 1908–1909 renovations of the Deanery, the sitting room was expanded into what was later termed the "Dorothy Vernon Room." The design and the name were inspired by Thomas' love of Charles Major's 1902 novel "Dorothy Vernon of Haddon Hall," a fictionalized version of the life of Elizabethan heiress, Dorothy Vernon. Haddon Hall is, in fact, an English country house located in Derbyshire, England and the dining room of this house was the inspiration for the Dorothy Vernon room at Bryn Mawr's Deanery.

The Dorothy Vernon room in the Deanery was designed by the architects of the second renovation, Archer and Allen, and Lockwood de Forest. De Forest decorated the spaces between the dark, exposed ceiling beams with decorative brass panels with East Indian patterns. The floor, like several other spaces on campus, was of Mercer tiles as per the request of Thomas herself as seen a 1908 letter to Mercer when she notes, "It seems to me that this large room would not be complete unless it had a tile floor."

The large space contained numerous chairs, couches, and other furnishings in a blend of Indian and English design. Several pieces of "deliberate Anglo-Indian design" were created for the Dorothy Vernon Room, consisting of a sofa (Deanery.354), two armchairs (Deanery.355–356), and two side chairs (Deanery.357–358). These pieces were made of dark wood decorated with panels of perforated copper and stenciled designs in black paint on the frame. From a 1908 photograph of the room, one can see some of Garrett's teakwood furniture from Baltimore (e.g. Deanery.382–383), as well as the swing settee by de Forest and his Ahmedebad Wood Carving Co. The settee is composed of intricately carved teak panels and hangs from four elaborately designed brass chains that depict three-dimensional birds, elephants, and human figures.

When the Deanery was demolished, the Dorothy Vernon room was dismantled and partially reconstructed in Haffner Hall in 1971, thus preserving a small part of the Deanery on campus. Two of the window casements, the ceiling beams, and the copper appliques from the ceiling were incorporated into Haffner Hall. The floor tiles were salvaged, but the new space was floored with new tiles of a similar color and shape. The space was then decorated with a number of works of art and pieces of furniture from the Deanery. In 2013 the Dorothy Vernon Room was dismantled during the ongoing renovations of Haffner Hall.

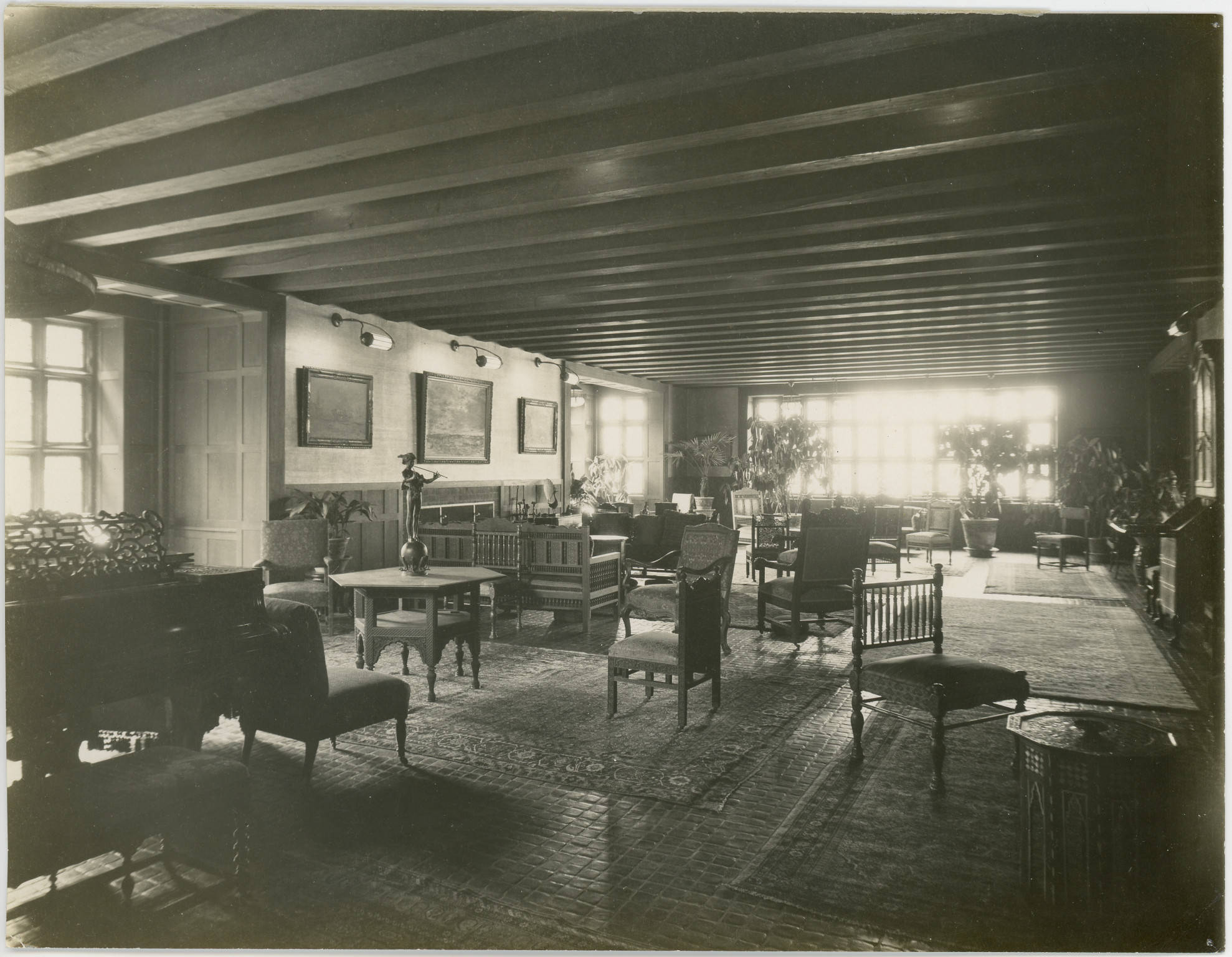
Dorothy Vernon Room, 1908.

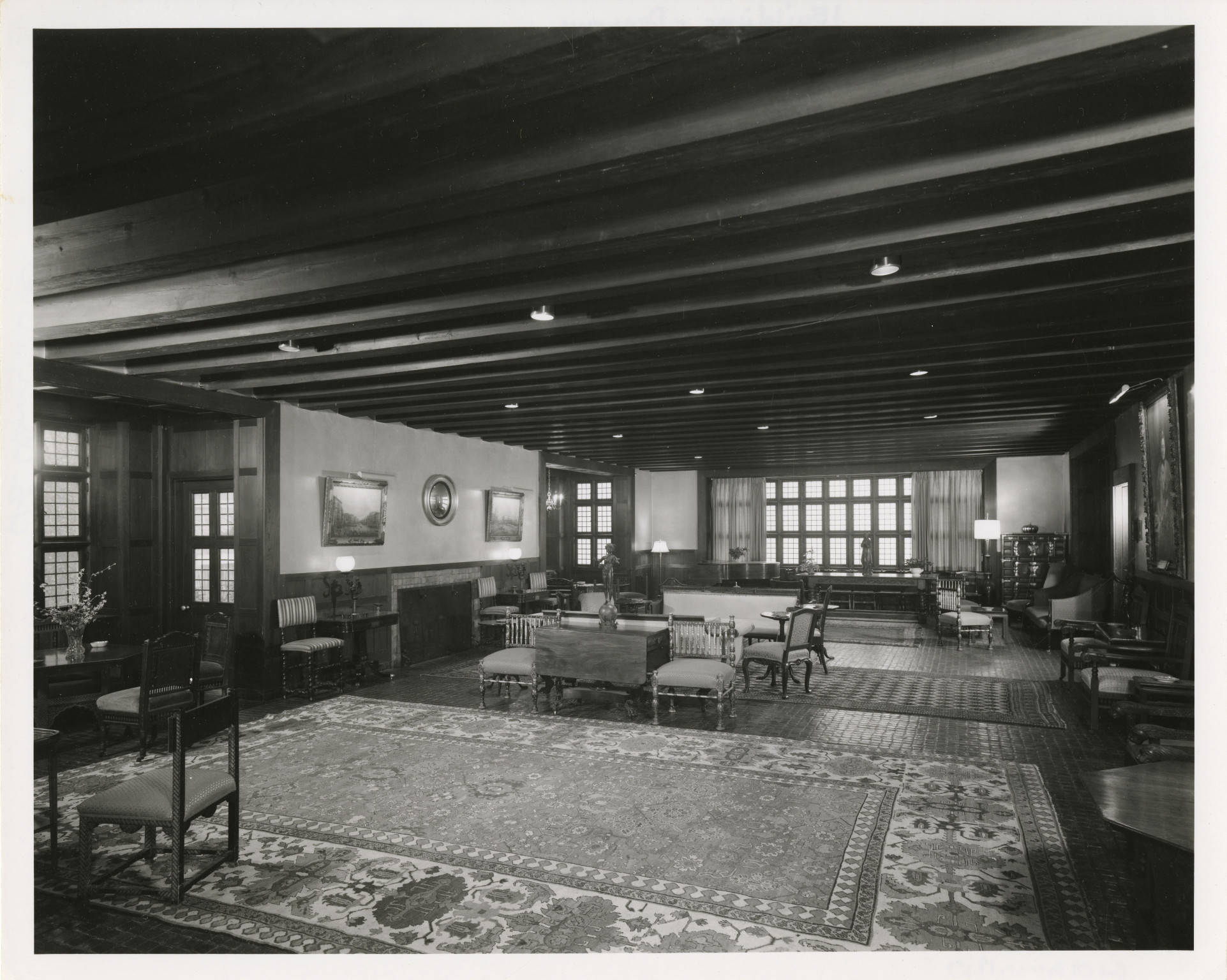
Dorothy Vernon Room, 1965.

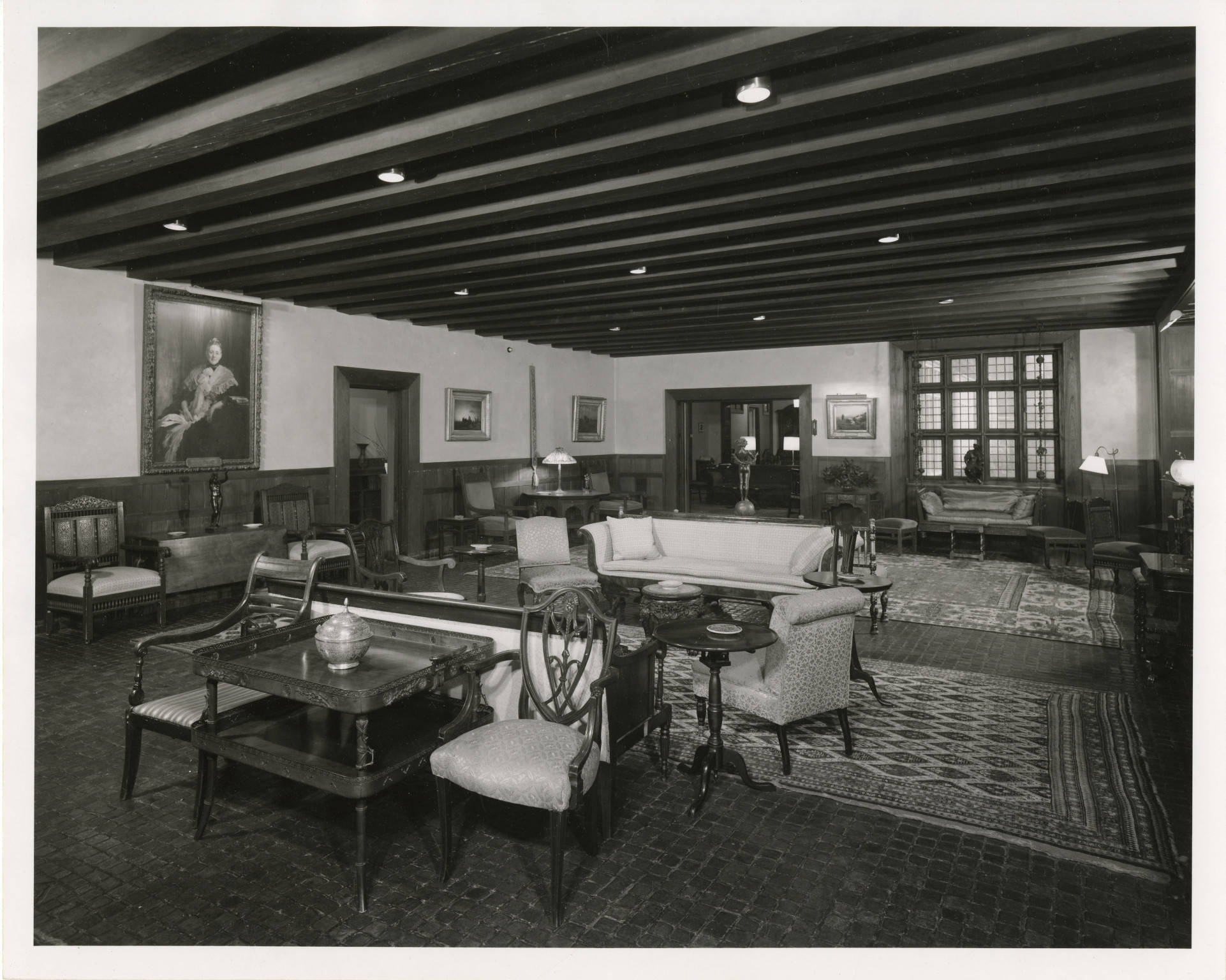
Dorothy Vernon Room, 1965.

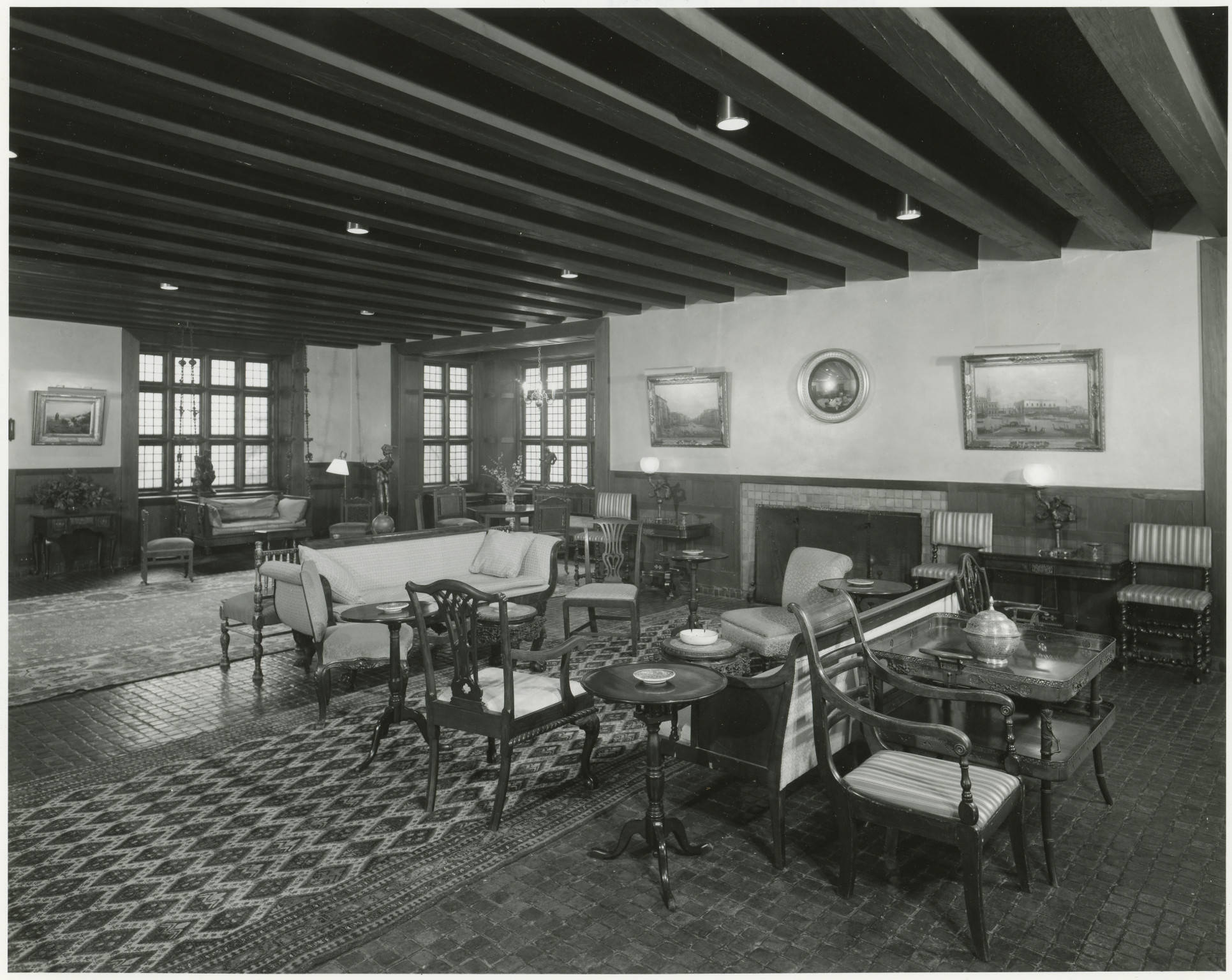
Dorothy Vernon Room, 1965.

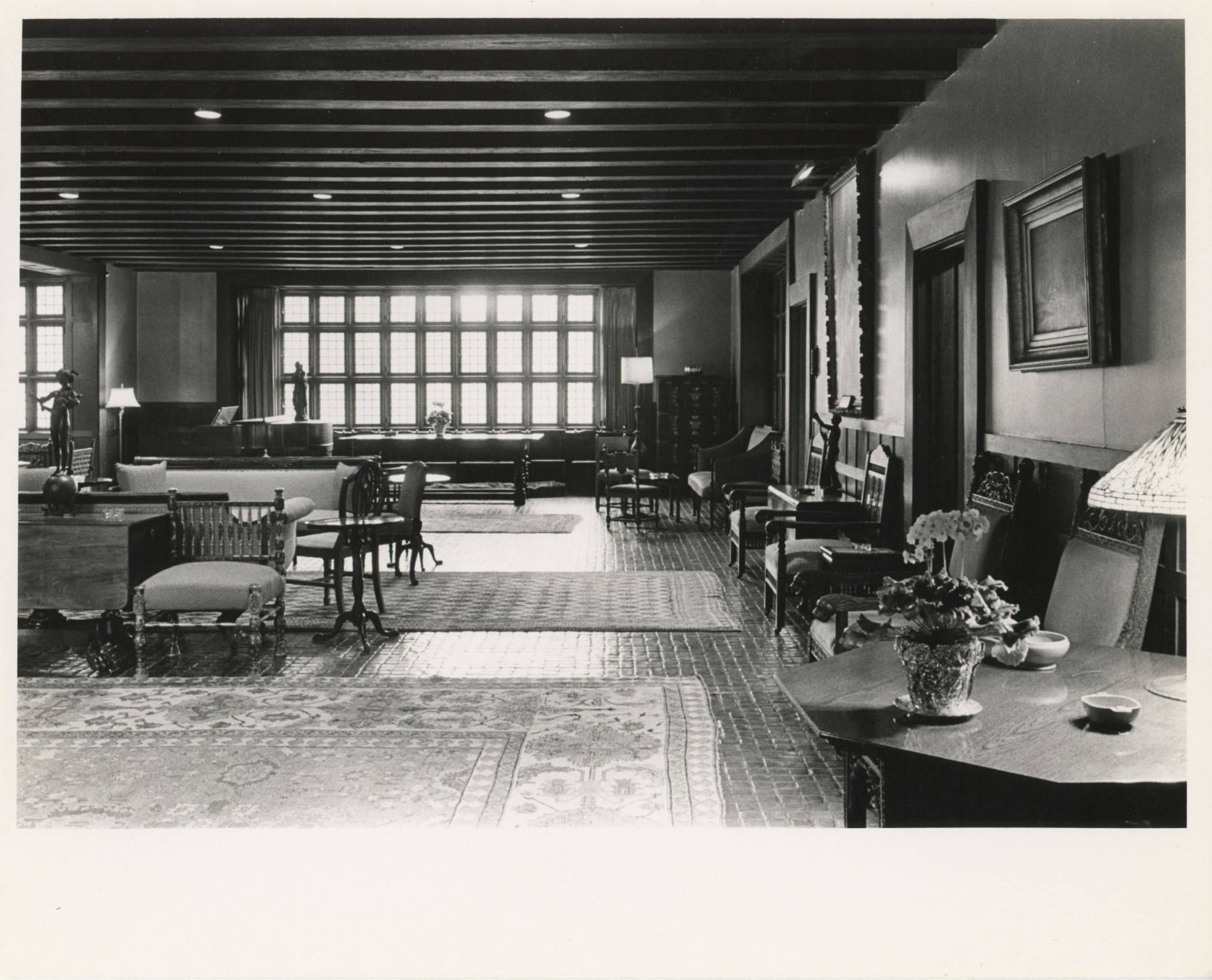
Dorothy Vernon Room, 1968.

=== Mercer tile ===
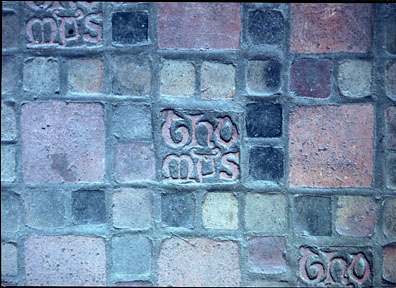
"Thomas" tiles from vestibule floor in Deanery

In the 1908–1909 renovation of the Deanery, M. Carey Thomas commissioned Henry Chapman Mercer to design and produce tiles for the floors of several rooms in the Deanery with his handmade tile, which were inspired by the tiles created by early German settlers in Pennsylvania. Prior to the Deanery, Thomas worked closely with Mercer in the decoration of Denbigh Hall, Pembroke East and West, Thomas Library, and the Cloisters with his tile. In their correspondence, Thomas regularly requested that each of the buildings have a different tile design, "in order to keep from looking like an institution". Three spaces in the Deanery were decorated with Mercer's tile: the vestibule, the Dorothy Vernon Room, and Mary Garrett's bedroom.

From the outset, Thomas wished to see a tiled floor in the Dorothy Vernon Room. While she originally asked Mercer to use octagonal tiles interspersed with small square ones, upon which de Forest would stencil additional designs, she settled on the same small square tiles that were used in the Thomas Library. The additional stenciling was never applied as planned, as Mercer feared that the large quantity of traffic in the room would quickly destroy the stenciling, as had happened in the Deanery's dining room. Four larger tiles with Old English designs were incorporated to differentiate this design from others on campus. For the Deanery vestibule, Thomas requested that Mercer create a new design that he had not used on campus in the other buildings. In a letter to Mercer from 1908, Thomas rejected the diagonal pattern that Mercer created, on account of her dislike of diagonals for being "unrestful". In response, Mercer created a straight pattern that consisted of alternating plain square tiles and square tiles stamped with the letters THO-MAS. which were inspired by a 14th-century British tile design. In addition to the floors in these two public spaces, Mercer's tiles were also used in the fireplace in Mary Garrett's bedroom. In her correspondence with Mercer from 1908, Thomas asked Mercer his advice on what sort of tile would be most useful and pretty for such a project, referencing a fireplace that Mercer had similarly decorated.

=== Garden ===
The Deanery Garden was a private garden space created behind the Deanery for M. Carey Thomas by John Charles Olmsted of the Olmsted Brothers landscape design firm. In 1907, Olmsted laid out the plans for a large garden that would be adjacent to the Deanery and was later constructed in 1909–1914 and 1921. The garden is often described as a "green garden" with only a few flowers, such as pink tulips, hyacinths, and geraniums, planted annually in the spring.

The garden was surrounded by a hedge and high walls, and contained within it three fountains designed by Lockwood de Forest. The two wall fountains were inspired by European and ancient fountains, and both were decorated with palm tiles from the tombs of Syrian saints that Thomas had purchased in Baghdad. Thomas and Mary Garrett were also responsible for the sculptural decoration in the garden, much of which was collected while abroad. These decorative additions included two stone lions from a Mandarin palace in Manchuria, sixteen bronze copies of figurines from Herculaneum, and three hundred yellow and white Murano glass lanterns. An electric bell was also placed in a balkin pine which Thomas would ring for tea or after-dinner coffee.

The garden remained mostly intact when the Deanery building was demolished for the construction of Canaday library. Of the three original fountains, only the two wall fountains remain with some of their original tile. Most of the sculpture has been removed from the garden as well. In 1974, the garden was renamed the Blanca Noel Taft Memorial Garden, after Blanca Noel ('39) who died from cancer, and refurbished with new benches and plantings.

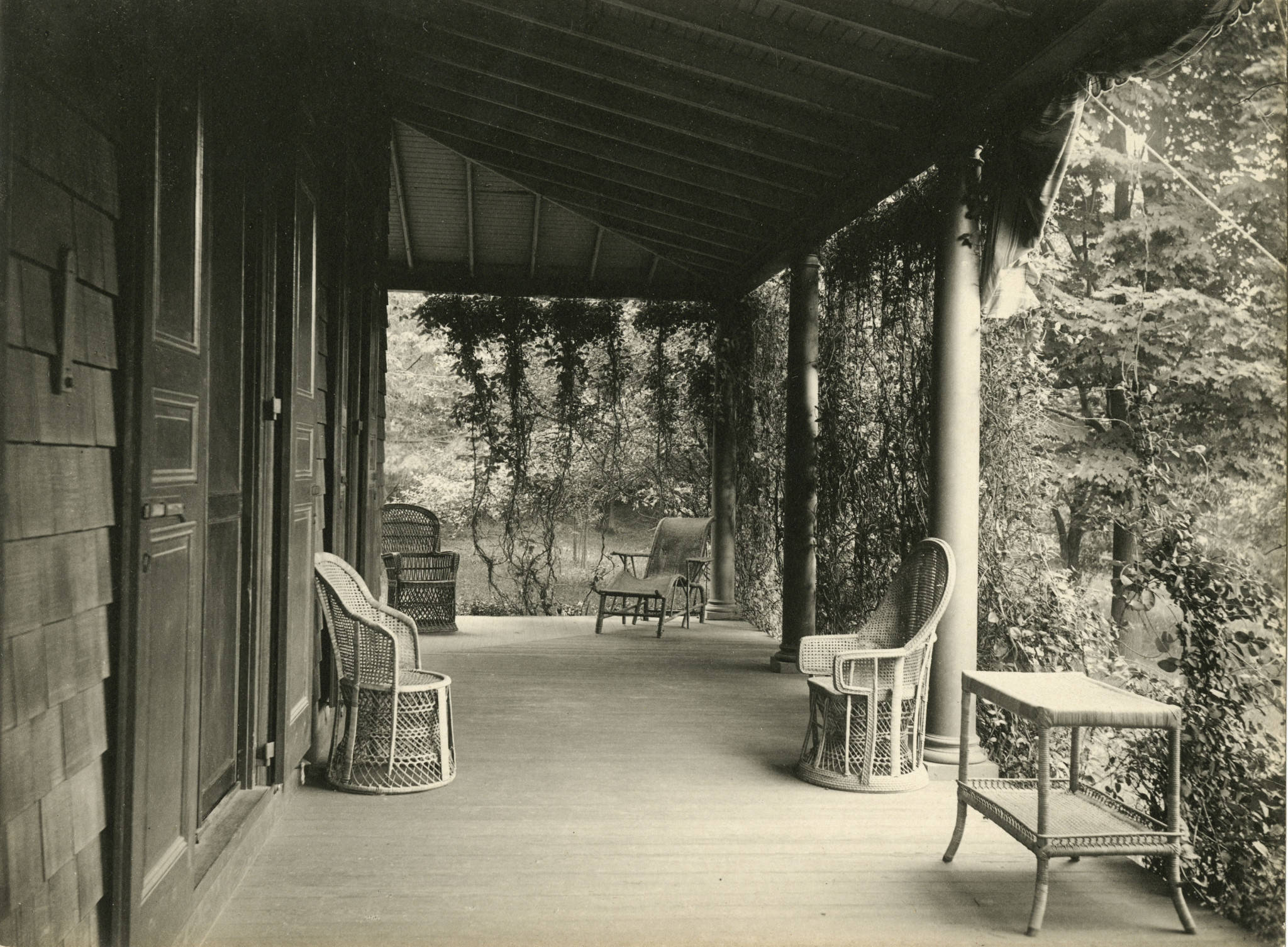
Veranda

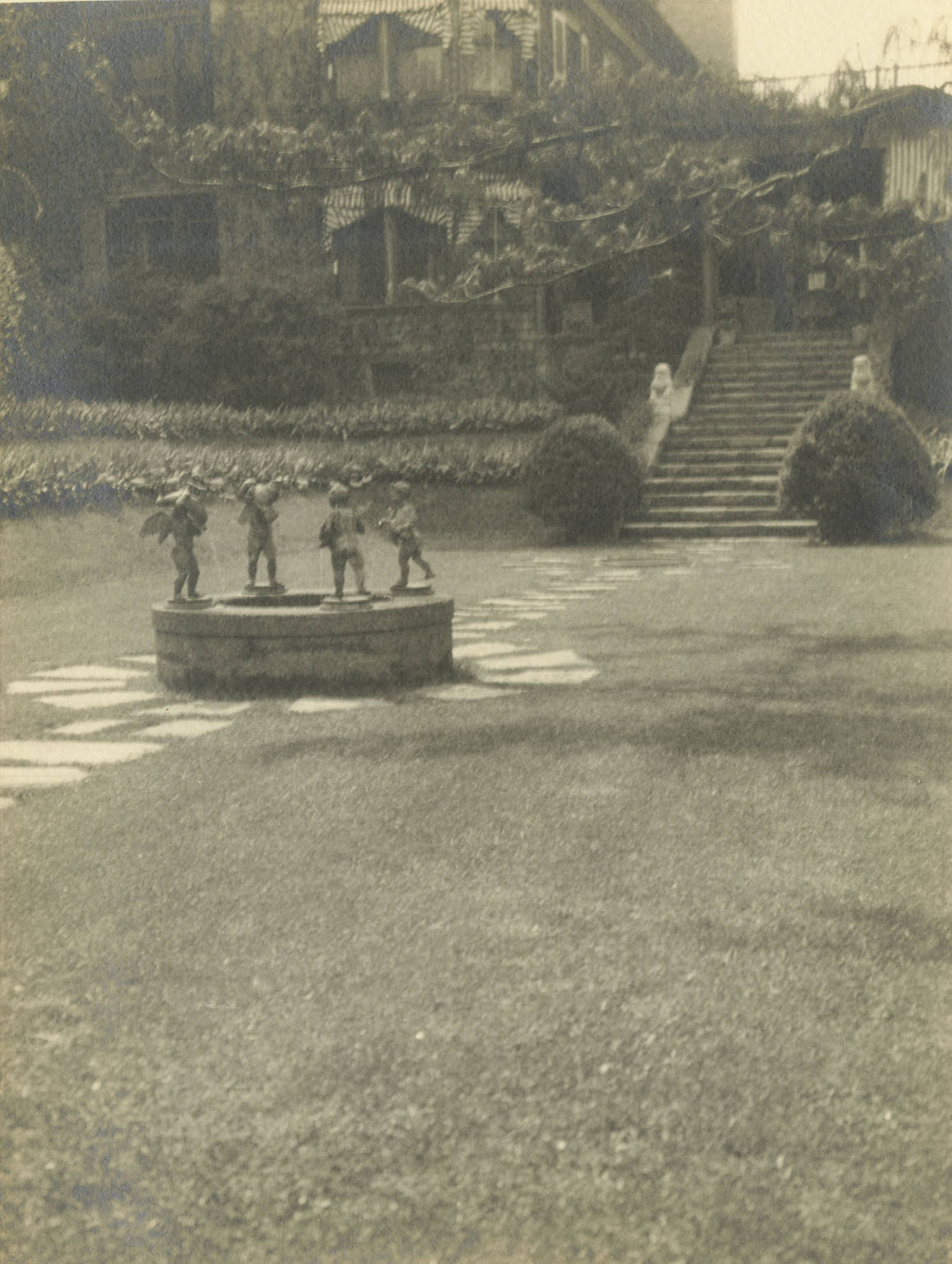
Looking toward the Veranda.

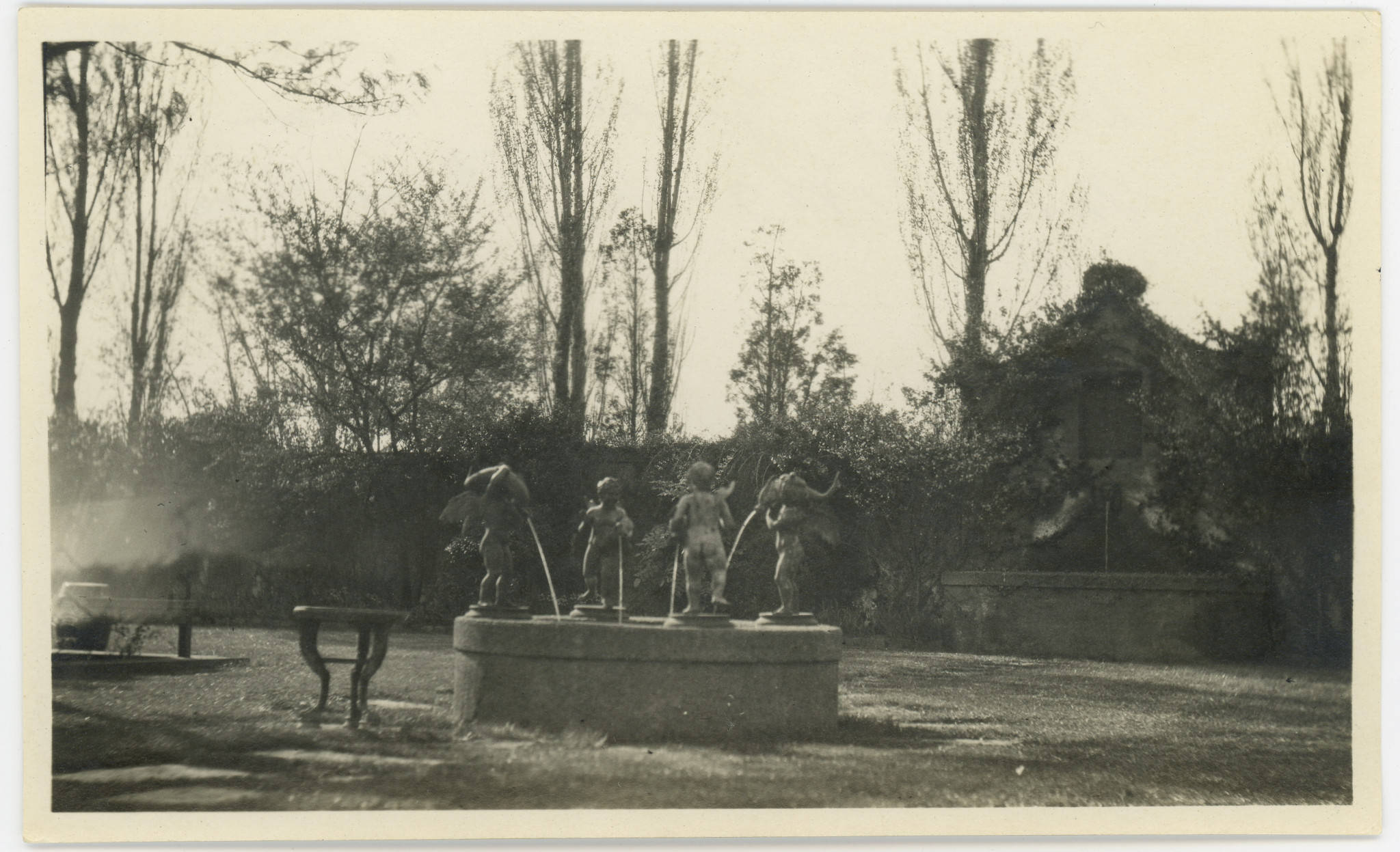
Fountain with bronze figurines (1917).

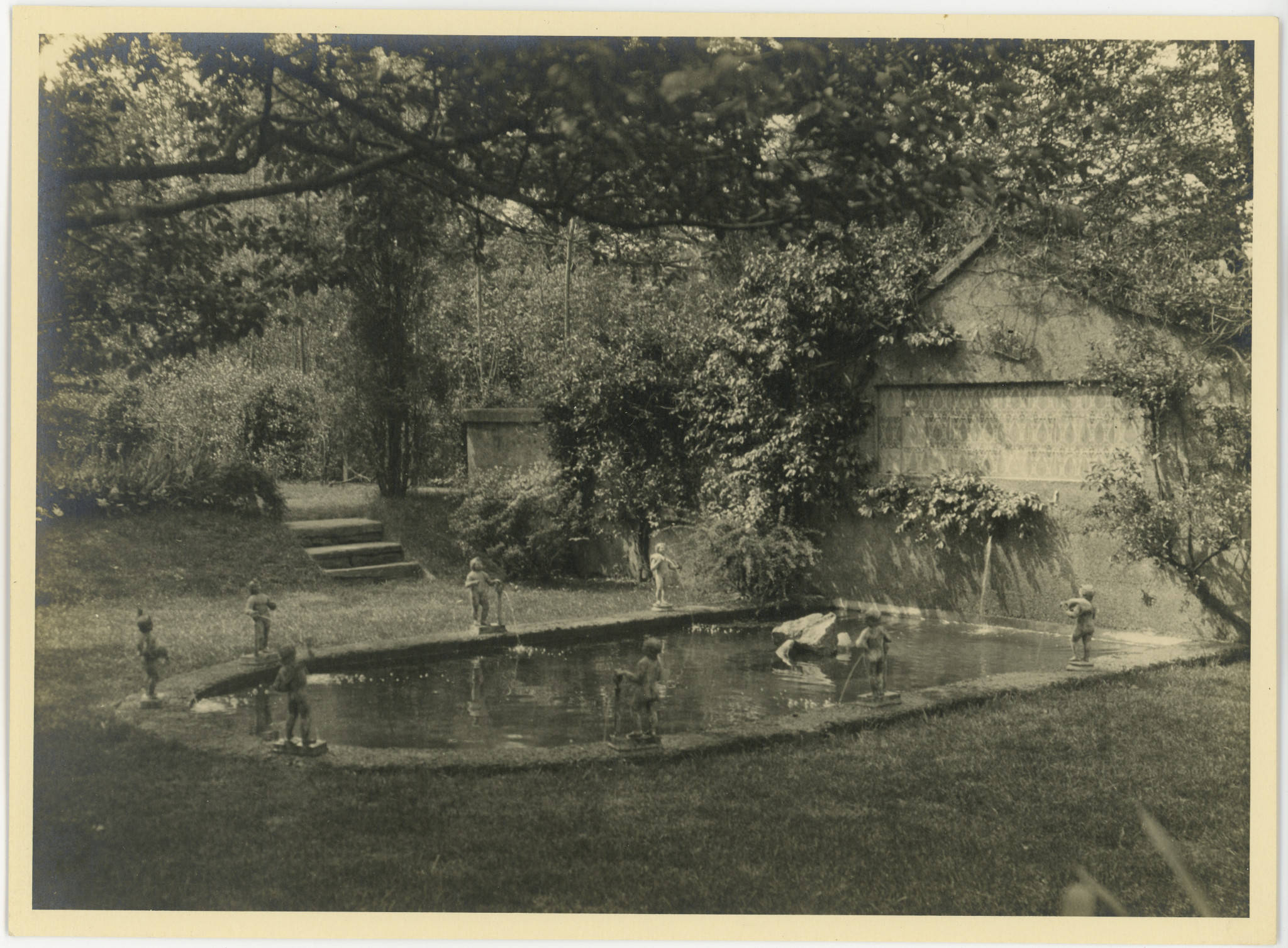
Wall fountain with bronze figurines and Syrian palm tiles.

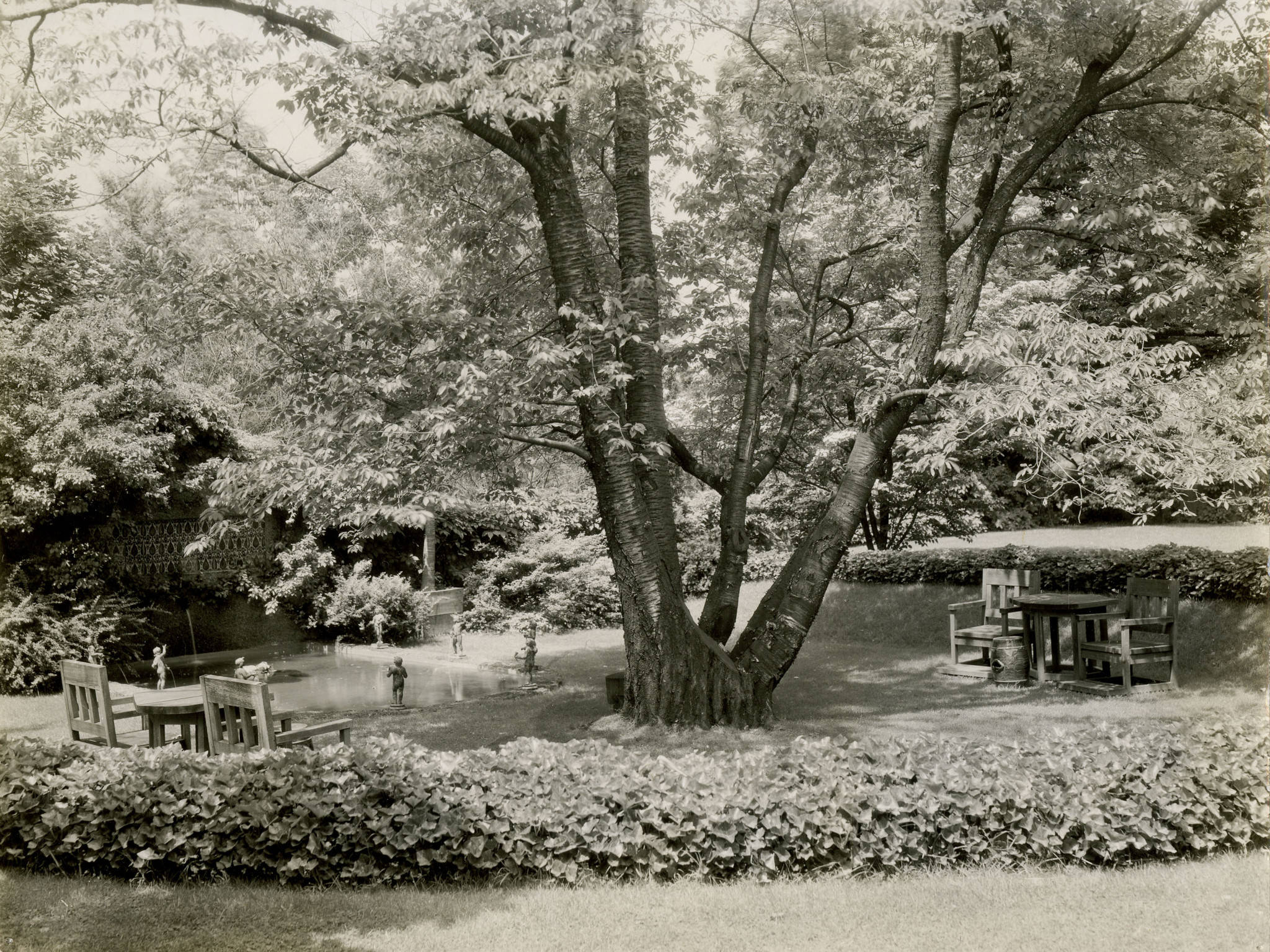
Garden in 1921.

== Notable guests ==
- Henry James, American writer
- Eleonora Duse, Italian actress
- Bertrand Russell, British philosopher
- Anna Howard Shaw, British-born women's suffrage activist
- William Butler Yeats, Irish poet
- Susan B. Anthony, American women's suffrage activist
- Marie Curie, Polish chemist and physicist

== Gallery ==
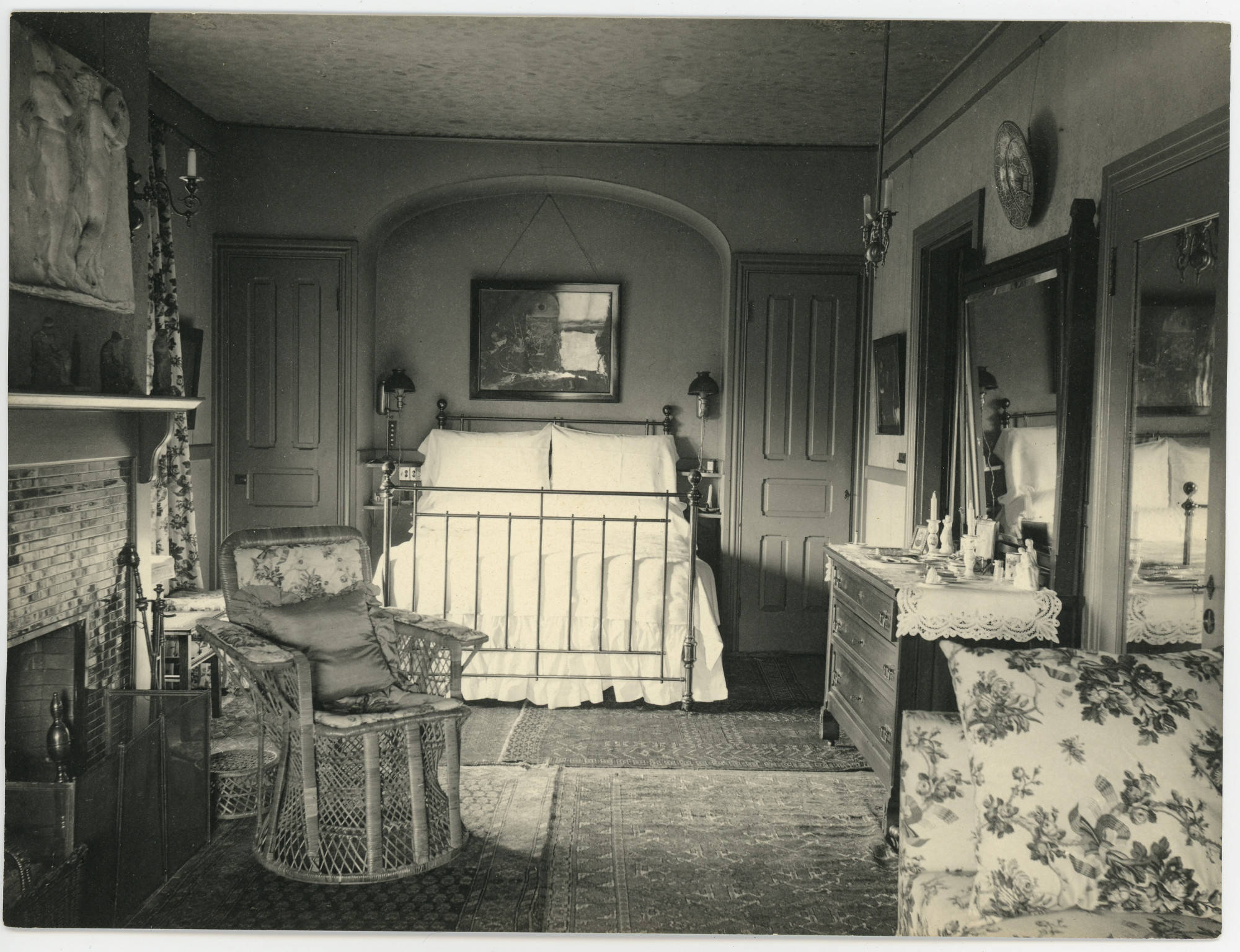
M. Carey Thomas' Bedroom, 1904.

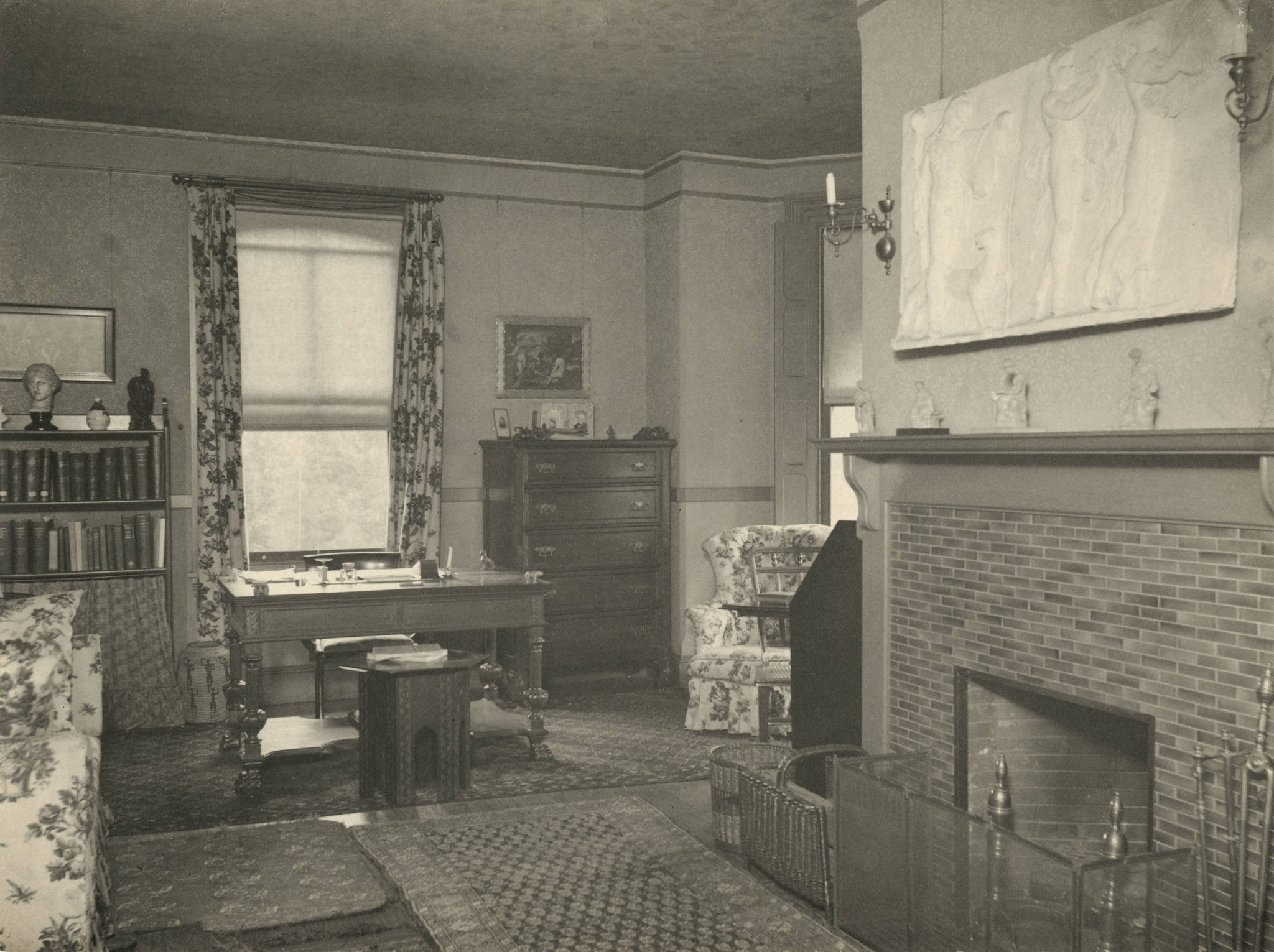
M. Carey Thomas' Bedroom, 1904.

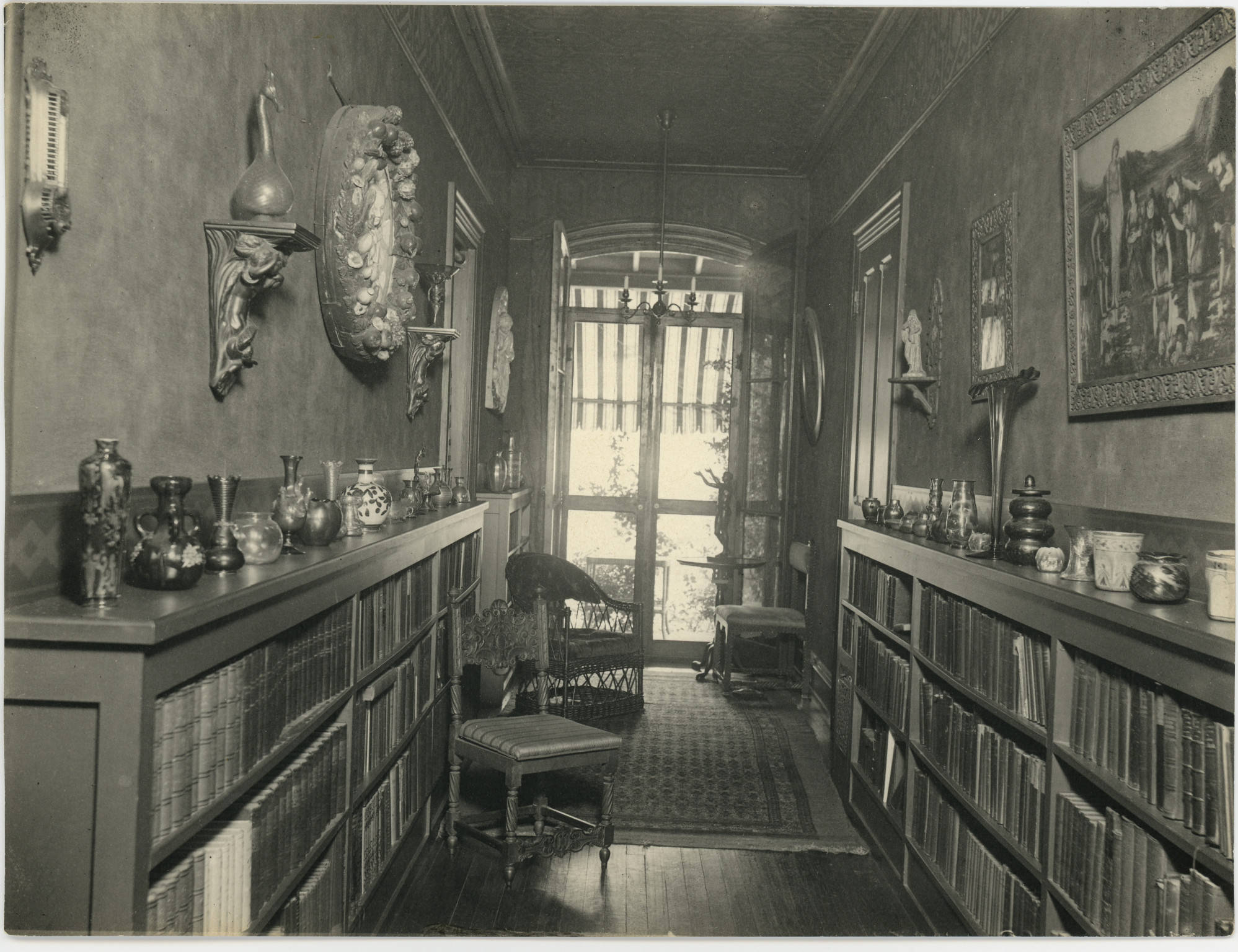
The Corridor Between the Blue Room and Mamie Gwinn's Study, 1904.

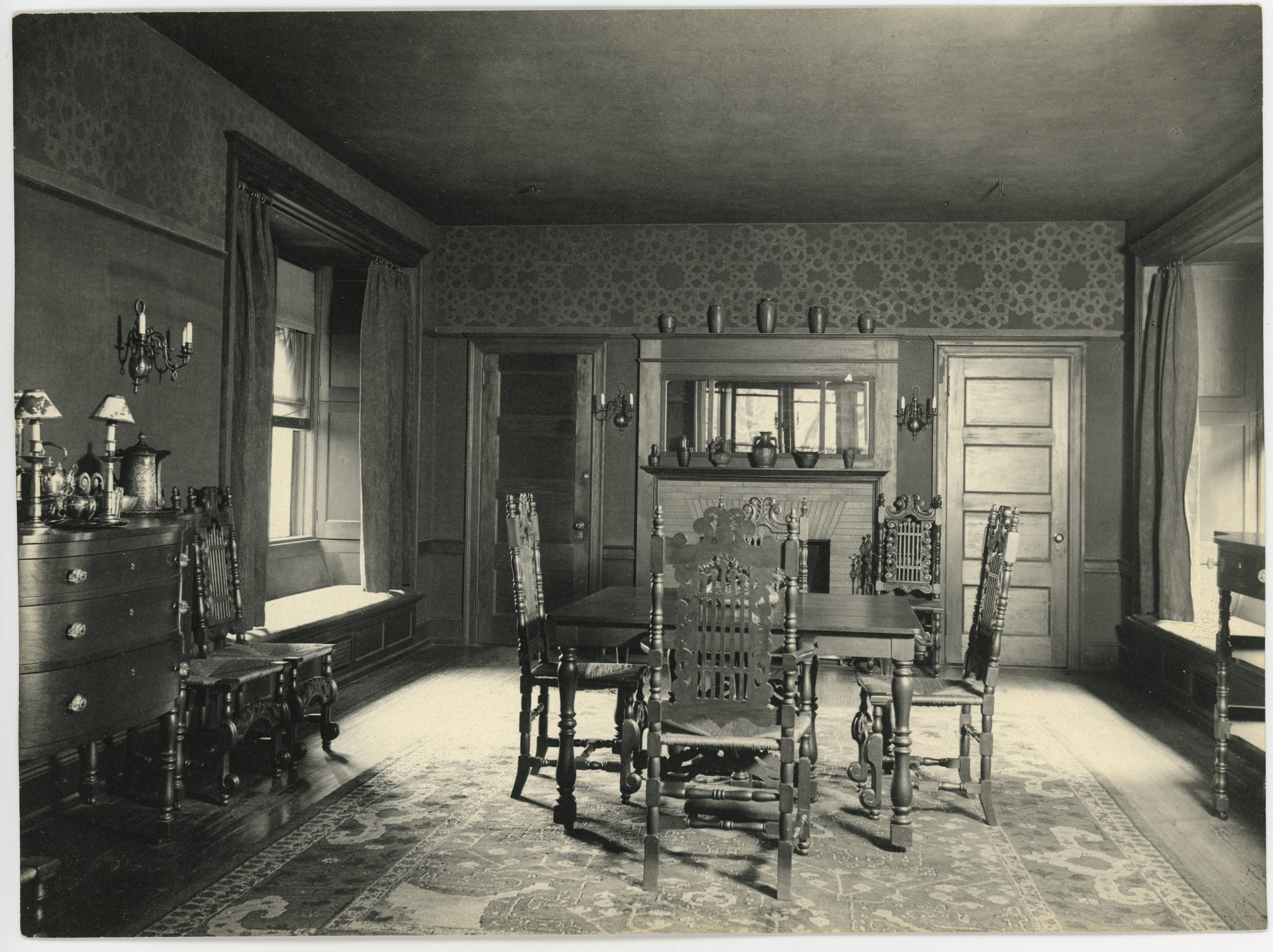
The Dining Room before the Lounge was added, 1904.

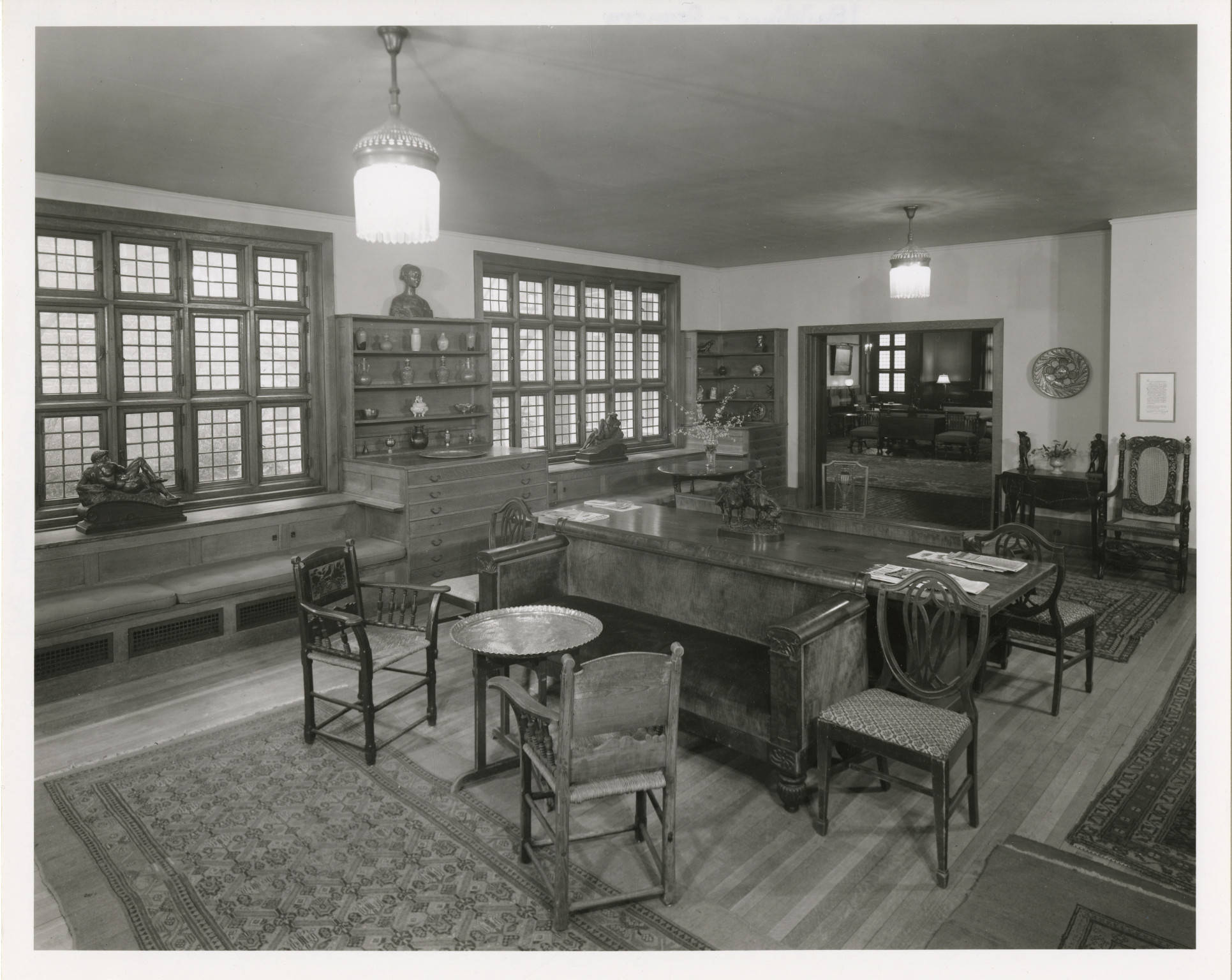
The Lounge, 1965.

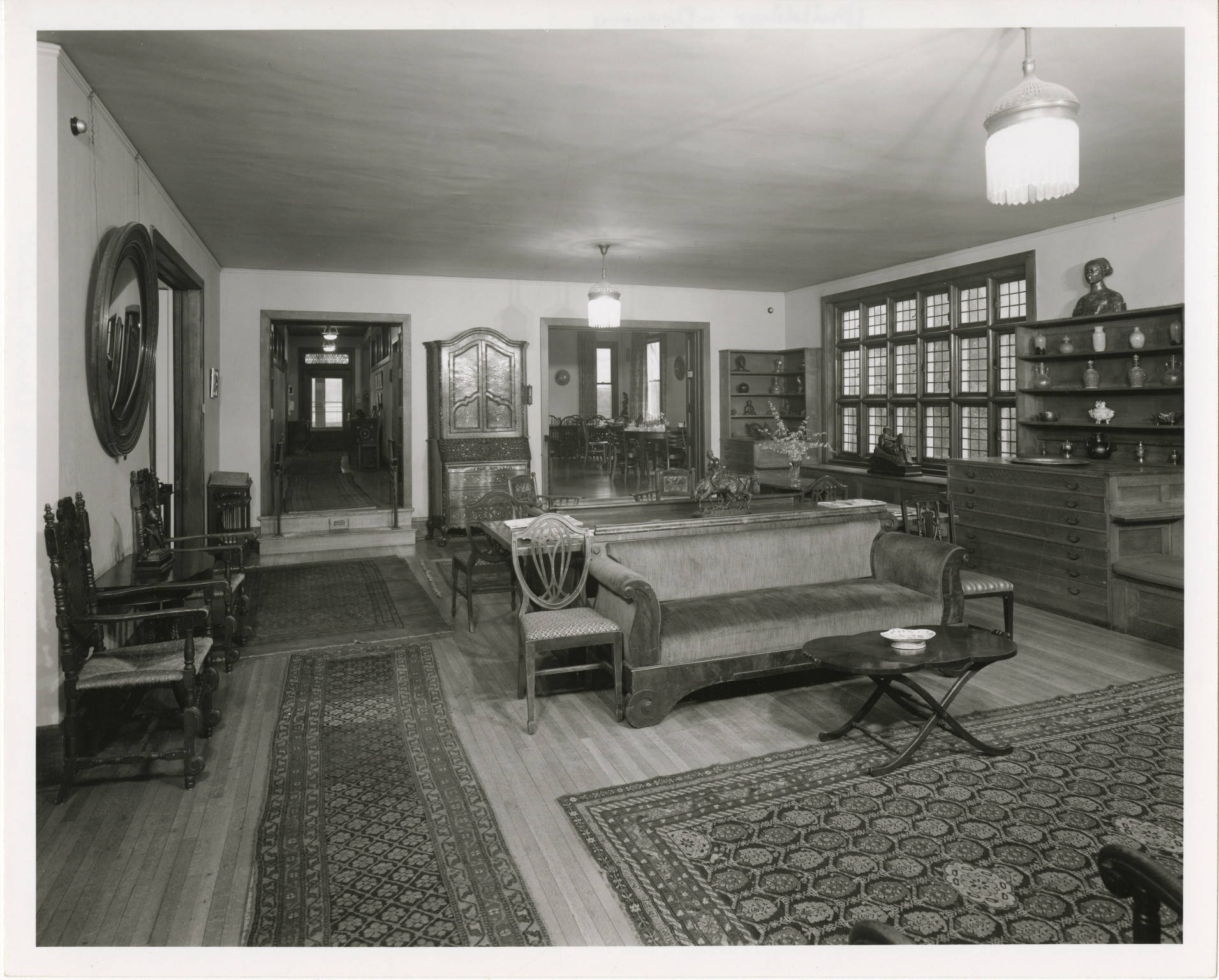
The Lounge, 1965.

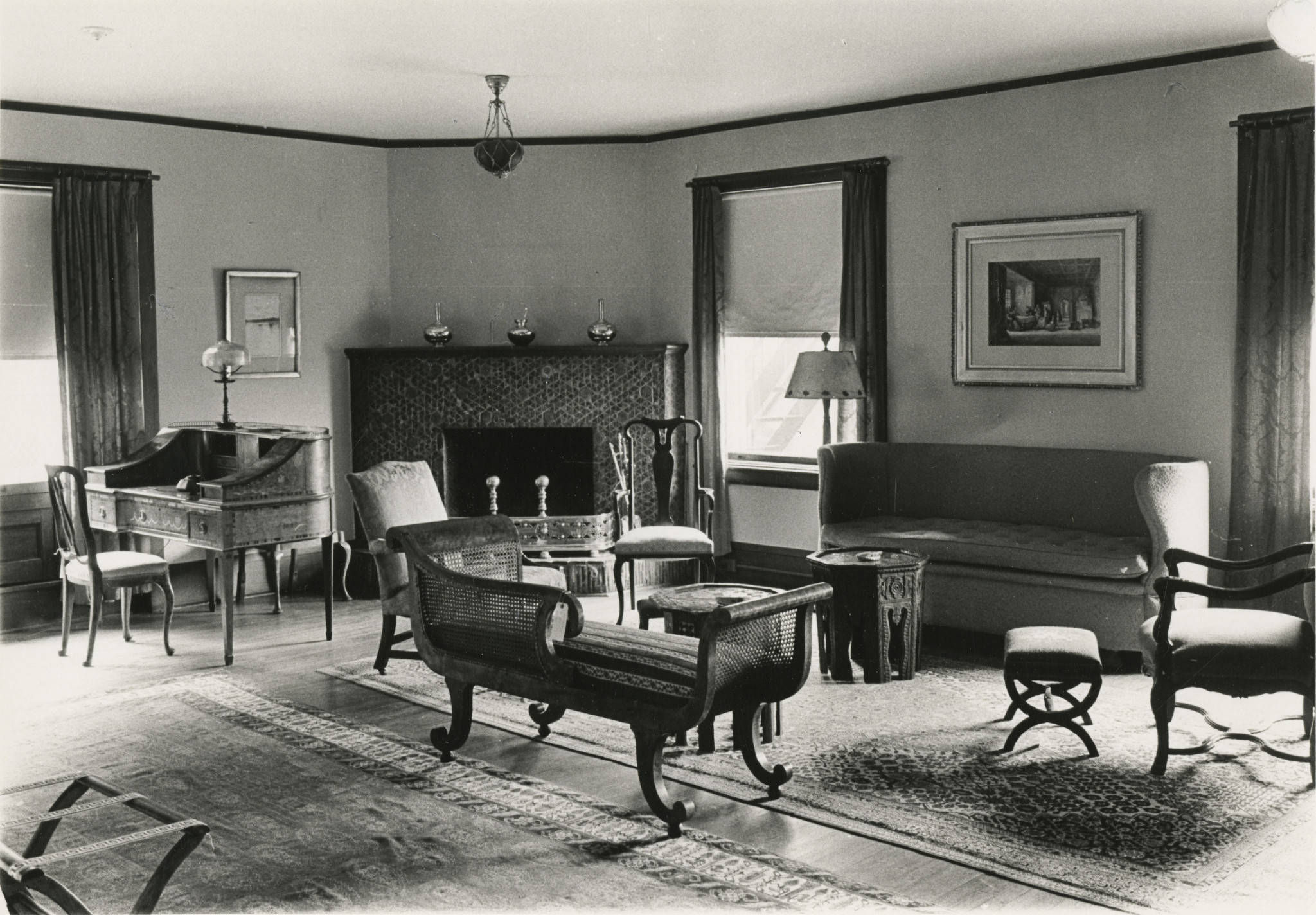
Mary E. Garrett's Bedroom, 1968

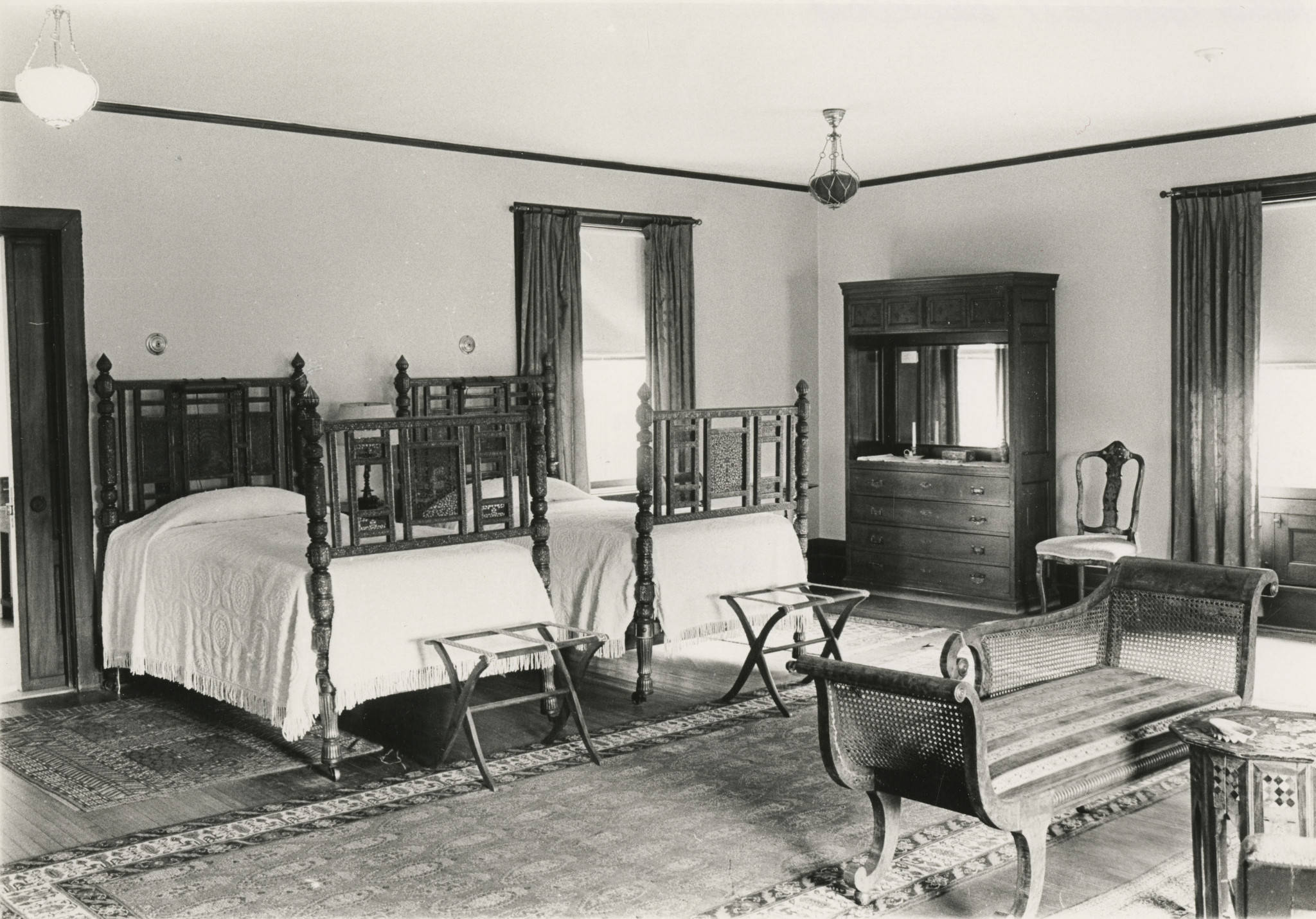
Mary E. Garrett's Bedroom, 1968.
