= James Rhoads =

James Evans Rhoads
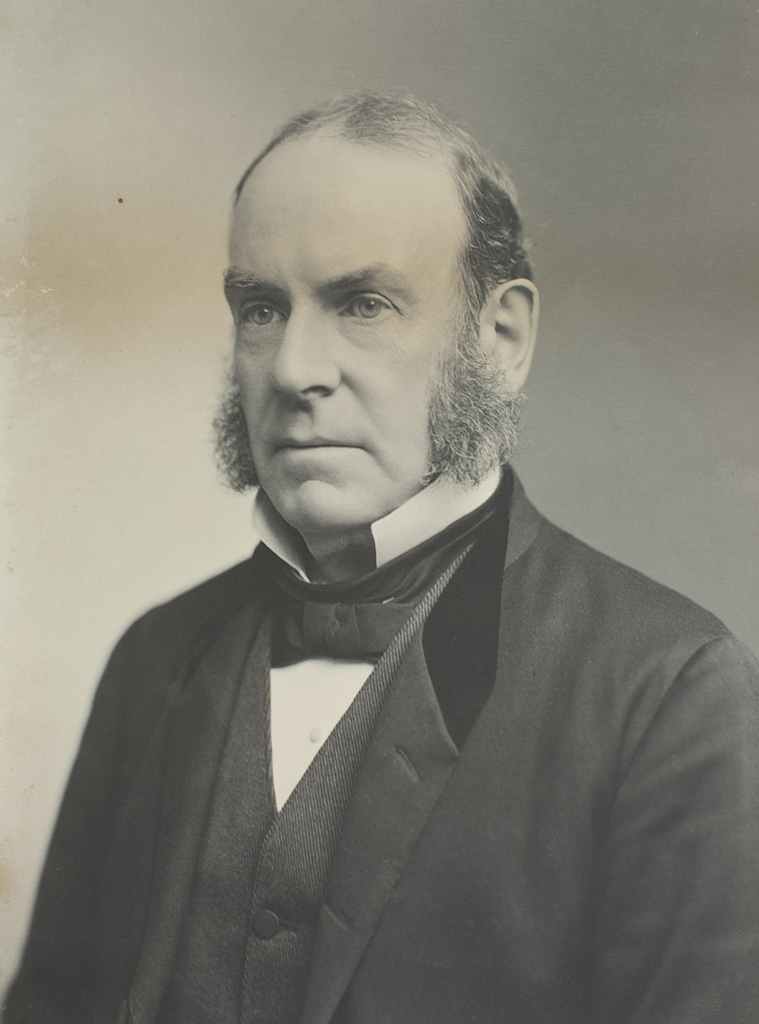

1st President of Bryn Mawr College
- In office 1884–1894
- Succeeded by: M. Carey Thomas

Personal details
- Born: 1828
- Died: 1895 (aged 66–67)
- Known for: Educator

James Evans Rhoads (1828—1895) from Marple Township, Pennsylvania was an American educator and administrator, president of Bryn Mawr College.

== Biography ==
At the founding of Bryn Mawr College, Rhoads was named Vice-President (Frances T. King was the first President). However, Rhoads became president in 1884 before Bryn Mawr was officially inaugurated on September 23, 1885. Rhoads helped establish Bryn Mawr as an internationally respected, non-denominational school. It was the first higher education institution to offer graduate degrees, including doctorates, to women. The first class included 36 undergraduate women and eight graduate students. At the founding Rhoads gave a brief speech honoring Joseph W. Taylor, Bryn Mawr's founder. Rhoads served until 1894. James E. Rhoads Hall was named after him.

Prior to serving as President of Bryn Mawr, Rhoads was an active advocate for the social and educational rights of African Americans and Native Americans. He was a founder of the Hampton Institute (later Hampton University) in Virginia and co-founded the Indian Rights Association in 1882.

M. Carey Thomas followed him as president of the college (prior to becoming President of Bryn Mawr College, Thomas served as the Dean of the Faculty).

In 1893, Rhoads was elected to the American Philosophical Society.
