= M. Carey Thomas =

American educator, suffragist, and linguist (1857–1935)

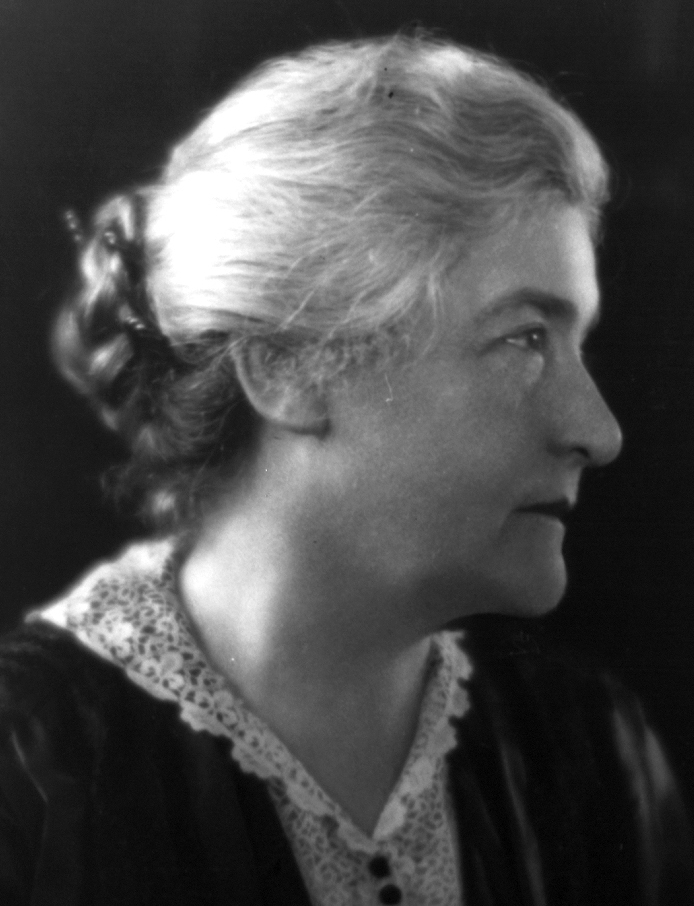
- Thomas in 1919

2nd President of Bryn Mawr College
- In office 1894–1922
- Preceded by: James Evans Rhoads
- Succeeded by: Marion Edwards Park

Personal details
- Born: Martha Carey Thomas; January 2, 1857 Baltimore, Maryland, U.S.
- Died: December 2, 1935 (aged 78) Philadelphia, Pennsylvania, U.S.
- Relatives: Millicent McIntosh (niece)
- Education: Cornell University
- Known for: Educator, suffragist

Martha Carey Thomas (January 2, 1857 – December 2, 1935) was an American educator, suffragist, and linguist. She was the second president of Bryn Mawr College, a women's liberal arts college in Bryn Mawr, Pennsylvania.

== Early life and education ==
Thomas was born in Baltimore, Maryland, on January 2, 1857. She was the daughter of James Carey Thomas and Mary (Whitall) Thomas. Thomas was noted to have been conceived "in full daylight", which her father believed would diminish the chance of his wife miscarrying.

Her family included many prominent Quakers, including her uncle and aunt Robert Pearsall Smith and Hannah Whitall Smith, and her cousins Alys Pearsall Smith (first wife of Bertrand Russell) and Mary Smith Berenson Costelloe (who married Bernard Berenson).

In 1864, when Carey Thomas was just seven years old, she was severely burned while trying to help her cook, Eliza, prepare lunch. Thomas's frock caught on fire and the young girl was engulfed in flames, which were shortly thereafter extinguished by her mother. Her recovery was long and arduous, a time during which her mother cared for her intently. Growing up, Thomas was strongly influenced by the staunch feminism of her mother and her mother's sister, Hannah, who became a prominent preacher. Her father was not entirely comfortable with feminist ideas, but his daughter was fiercely independent, and he supported her in these endeavors.

Although both her parents were orthodox members of the Society of Friends, Thomas' education and European travel led her to question those beliefs and develop a love for music and theater, both of which were considered incompatible with orthodox Quakerism. This religious questioning led to friction with her mother.

Thomas initially attended a Society of Friends school in Baltimore. Minnie had a strong childhood relationship with her cousin, Frank Smith, Hannah Smith's son. The two were almost inseparable until Frank's sudden death in 1872. Minnie became deeply depressed, moving her parents to send her, along with her cousin, Bessie, to the Howland Institute, a Quaker boarding school near Ithaca, New York, in October 1872. While at Howland, Minnie decided to dress as a man in the school's opera, which made her mother very upset, for it was "repugnant to her taste". It was here that Miss Slocum, a teacher at Howland, influenced Minnie to study education, rather than medicine. Thomas hoped to enter Cornell University to pursue further education, but met with her father's objections. After a great deal of pleading from both Thomas and her mother, her father relented.

Thomas attended Sage College, the women's school at Cornell University, in September 1875, where she formally changed her first name to Carey. She graduated from Cornell University in 1877. Cornell offered her both the position of professor of literature and dean of Sage College, but she did not consider either. She did graduate work in Greek at Johns Hopkins University, but withdrew because she was not permitted to attend classes. She did further graduate work at the University of Leipzig, but that university did not grant degrees to women. She then went to the University of Zurich and earned a Ph.D. in linguistics, summa cum laude, in 1882 for her dissertation, which was a philological analysis of Sir Gawain and the Green Knight. This dissertation continued to be highly regarded by specialists eighty years later.

She was the first woman and the first foreigner to receive such a doctorate from the university. She then spent some time in Paris, where she attended lectures by Gaston Paris at the Sorbonne, and then returned to the United States. Thomas did not pursue her degree out of love for her academic work, but rather out of a desire to show Americans that women had the same intellectual capacity as men.

== Career ==
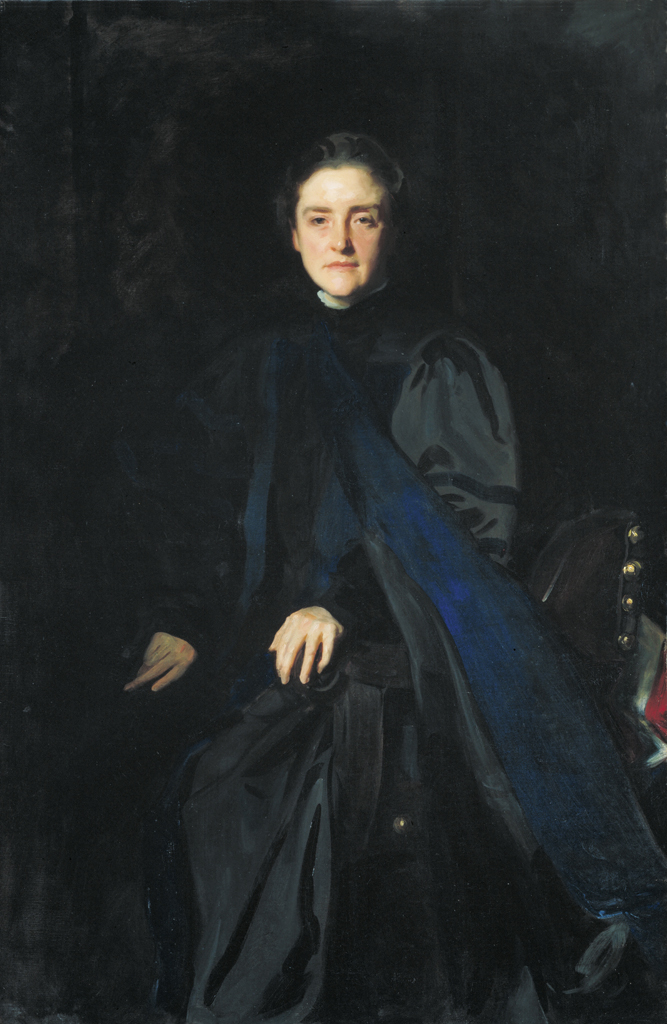
An 1899 portrait of Thomas by John Singer Sargent

In 1882, Thomas wrote a letter to the trustees of Bryn Mawr College, requesting that she be made president of the university. She was not granted the position, however, as the trustees were concerned about her relative youth and lack of experience. Instead, Thomas entered in 1884 as the dean of the college and chair of English. Despite not receiving her desired role at Bryn Mawr, Thomas was active in the college's administration, working closely with then president James Rhoads. According to the biographical dictionary Notable American Women: 1607–1950, by 1892 she was "acting president in all but name". She hired Woodrow Wilson as professor of history and government, 1882-1885.

At the end of April 1884 Thomas went with the encouragement of President Rhoads to tour other colleges in the area to become familiar with them in order to bring ideas back to Bryn Mawr. She started her tour at Vassar, then she went on to Smith College, Wellesley, and ended her tour at Radcliffe (or the Harvard Annex as it was called).

In 1885, Thomas, together with Mary Garrett, Mamie Gwinn (February 2, 1860 – November 11, 1940), Elizabeth King, and Julia Rogers, founded The Bryn Mawr School, a prep school in Baltimore, Maryland. The school would produce well-educated young women who met the very high entrance standards of Bryn Mawr College.

In 1894, President Rhoads died, and Thomas was narrowly elected to succeed him on September 1, 1894. Out of respect for President Rhoads's recent death, Thomas was not given a ceremony. She was president until 1922 and remained as Dean until 1908.

During her tenure as president, Thomas' primary concern was upholding the highest standards of admissions and academic rigor. The entrance examinations for the college were made as difficult as those at Harvard University, and pupils could not gain admission by certificate. For the academic curriculum, Thomas emulated the "group system" of Johns Hopkins, in which students were required to take parallel courses in a logical sequence. Students could not freely choose electives. There were also other requirements, including a foreign language requirement that culminated in a sight translation examination proctored by Thomas herself. Overall, the academic curriculum at Bryn Mawr under Thomas shunned liberal arts education, preferring more traditional topics such as Greek, Latin, and mathematics. Thomas was also instrumental in bringing several new buildings to the College, which introduced collegiate Gothic architecture to the United States.

In 1908, she became the first president of the National College Women's Equal Suffrage League. She was also a leading member of the National American Woman Suffrage Association. After 1920 she advocated the policies of the National Woman's Party. She was one of the early promoters of an equal rights amendment to the U.S. Constitution.

Thomas maintained an ongoing intimate relationship with long-time friend, Mamie Gwinn. Thomas and Gwinn lived together at Bryn Mawr College in a small cottage that came to be known as "the Deanery". "As late as the first decade of the twentieth century, she wrote of her relationship with Mamie in language analogous to marriage. But by the 1920s she faced a different world. The love between women that had once been broadly accepted was now being portrayed in fiction and on the stage as lesbian and deviant." When Gwinn left Thomas in 1904 to marry (a love triangle fictionalized in Gertrude Stein's Fernhurst) Alfred Hodder, a fellow Professor of English at Bryn Mawr College, Thomas pursued a relationship with Mary Elizabeth Garrett. Thomas shared her campus home, the Deanery, with Garrett and together they endeavored to grow Bryn Mawr's resources. Upon her death, Garrett, who had been prominent in suffrage work and a benefactor of Bryn Mawr, left to President Thomas "a sum which would, in 1994, be close to $15,000,000." to be disposed of as she saw fit. M. Carey Thomas had firm views on marriage, and in a letter to her mother she described it as a "Loss of freedom, poverty, and a personal subjection for which I see absolutely no compensation."

Both during and before her tenure as college president, Thomas actively worked to bar Jews from entering Bryn Mawr, both as faculty members and as students, biographer Helen Lefkowitz Horowitz noted. Thomas blocked the hiring of Jewish teachers, and later worked to remove Jewish candidates from consideration for faculty positions, noting she preferred to have faculty made up of "our own good Anglo-Saxon stock." She tried to block the admission of Sadie Szold, a Jewish student, to the college.

In a speech to the freshman class of 1916, Thomas said: "If the present intellectual supremacy of the white races is maintained, as I hope that it will be for centuries to come, I believe that it will be because they are the only races that have seriously begun to educate their women." While Thomas claimed that African American students did not apply to Bryn Mawr during her tenure as president, she diverted Jessie Redmon Fauset, an African American student who received a scholarship to attend Bryn Mawr in 1901, to Cornell University, and helped pay a portion of Fauset's tuition.

In August 2017, Bryn Mawr President Kim Cassidy addressed Thomas' "racism and anti-Semitism' and demands by some that the school drop Thomas' name from several buildings. "While Thomas had a profound impact on opportunities for women in higher education ... on the academic development and identity of Bryn Mawr, and on the physical plan of the campus, she also openly and vigorously advanced racism and anti-Semitism as part of her vision of the College. Some of you have suggested that the College rename Thomas Library and Thomas Great Hall because of this legacy, and others have suggested making that history explicit in other ways."

In 2018, the buildings formerly known as Thomas Library and Thomas Hall was renamed Old Library and Great Hall.

Thomas retired in 1922, at age sixty-five. She was succeeded by Marion Edwards Park, who served as a dean at both Simmons and Radcliffe Colleges. The Bryn Mawr Summer School for Women Workers in Industry, which was founded at Carey's behest in 1921, was a sort of "grand finale" bookending Thomas' legacy as an earlier shaper of the college.

Mary Garrett left a considerable fortune to Thomas, who spent the last two decades of her life traveling the world in luxury, including trips to India, the Sahara, and France.

== Death ==
Thomas died in Philadelphia on December 2, 1935, of a coronary occlusion. She had returned to Philadelphia to address Bryn Mawr College on the 50th anniversary of its founding. Her ashes were scattered on the Bryn Mawr College campus in the cloisters of Thomas Library.
