= Joseph W. Taylor =

American physician (1810–1880)

Joseph Wright Taylor (1810 – 1880) is best known for being the financial catalyst for the founding of Bryn Mawr College. He was a graduate of the University of Pennsylvania, a medical doctor and a member of the Society of Friends (popularly known as Quakers), and originally wanted the college to promote the ideals of the Quaker religion and the advancement of women's education. In 1878 he paid $53,500 for forty acres in Bryn Mawr, Pennsylvania.

In 1879, Taylor had begun to give physical shape to his idea for a women's college. He was involved in the planning of the practical and conceptual aspects of the new institution, including the selection of a site, an architect, and a landscape designer. Among the practical considerations for the final site selection were the location's healthfulness and proximity to the railroad, Haverford College, and Philadelphia. The original campus, a small segment of the Thomas-Humphries Tract and part of a larger property deeded by William Penn to Edward Pritchard and Co. in 1682, comprised thirty-two acres between Merion, Roberts, Gulph and Yarrow roads.

By 1893, the Board of Directors had expanded from the Quaker focus to make the college non-denominational.

I have been impressed with the need of such a place for the advanced education of our young female Friends, and to have all the advantages of a College education which are so freely offered to young men.

— Joseph W. Taylor on founding Bryn Mawr College
