= List of Bryn Mawr College people =

The following is a list of individuals associated with Bryn Mawr College through attending as a student, or serving as a member of the faculty or staff.

== Presidents ==
The following persons served as president of Bryn Mawr College:

No.	Image	Name	Term start	Term end	Ref.
1		James Rhoads	1885	1894	
2		M. Carey Thomas	1894	1922	
3		Marion Edwards Park	1922	1942	
4		Katharine Elizabeth McBride	1942	1970	
5		Harris Wofford	1970	1978	
6		Mary Patterson McPherson	1978	1997	
7		Nancy J. Vickers	July 1, 1997	June 30, 2008	
8		Jane Dammen McAuliffe	July 1, 2008	June 30, 2013	
interim		Kimberly Wright Cassidy	July 1, 2013	February 12, 2014	
9		Kimberly Wright Cassidy	February 12, 2014	June 30, 2024	
10		Wendy Cadge	July 1, 2024	present	

== Notable alumni ==
Name	Year of graduation	Notability	Reference(s)
Layla AbdelRahim	A.B. 1993	Author and anthropologist	
Sil Lai Abrams	2021	Writer and activist	
Nadia Abu El Haj	1984	Anthropologist at Barnard College	
Renata Adler	1959	Writer	
Maya Ajmera	1989	Founder of The Global Fund for Children	
Dorothy Harriet Camille Arnold	1905	Vanished socialite	
Ellis Avery	1993	Novelist	
Emily Greene Balch	1889	Nobel Peace Prize winner, 1946	
Leila Cook Barber	A.B. 1925	Art historian and professor emeritus at Vassar College, specializing in the Renaissance art and Medieval studies	
Margaret Ayer Barnes	1907	Writer, Pulitzer Prize for the Novel winner, 1931	
Genevieve Bell	1990	Cultural anthropologist at Intel Labs	
Cora Agnes Benneson	1887, fellow	Attorney, lecturer, and writer	
Marie Bernard	1972	Deputy director of the National Institute on Aging at the National Institutes of Health	
Florence Bird	1928	Canadian journalist and politician	
Margaret McKelvy Bird	1931	Socialite and archaeologist	
Mary G. F. Bitterman		President, Osher Foundation	
Eleanor Albert Bliss	1921	Bacteriologist	
Katharine Burr Blodgett	1917	Chemist and engineer	
Grace Lee Boggs	Ph.D. 1940	Activist and author	
Sarmila Bose	1981	Journalist	
Ana Patricia Botin	1981	CEO of Banco Santander, Santander UK, and Banesto	
Kathy Boudin	1965	Weathermen member convicted of murder and bank robbery	
Margaret Buchanan	Ph.D. 1922	Mathematician, professor emeritus, West Virginia University	
Barbara Ann Burtness	AB, 1982	Internist and oncologist	
A. S. Byatt	graduate work 1957–1958, did not graduate	Postmodern novelist	
Jane Calvin	1959	Artist	
John D. Caputo	Ph.D. 1968	Philosophy professor at Syracuse University	
Marjorie Constance Caserio	MA in chemistry in 1951, PhD in 1956	Chemist	
Birutė Ciplijauskaitė	Ph.D. 1964	Vilas Professor of Spanish University of Wisconsin–Madison	
Susy Clemens	did not graduate	Daughter of author Mark Twain	
Bruce Cole	Ph.D. 1969	Chairman of National Endowment for the Humanities	
Soraya M. Coley	M.S.S. 1974, Ph.D. 1981	Sixth university president of Cal Poly Pomona	
Joyce Mitchell Cook	1955	First African American woman to receive a PhD in philosophy and the first woman to be appointed to an assistant teacher position at Yale	
Mary Little Cooper	1968	Judge on the U.S. District Court for the District of New Jersey	
Katayoun Copeland		Assistant U.S. attorney and district attorney of Delaware County, Pennsylvania	
Regna Darnell	1965	Anthropologist	
Hilda Doolittle	did not graduate	Modernist poet	
Eleanor Lansing Dulles	1917	Economist	
Helen Flanders Dunbar	1923	Important early figure in U.S. psychosomatic medicine	
Mary Maples Dunn	M.A. 1956, Ph.D. 1959	Former president of Smith College	
Lee McGeorge Durrell	1971	Author, television presenter, zookeeper	
Madeline Early	M.A. 1933, Ph.D. 1936	Mathematician, professor	
Roselyn J. Eisenberg	1960	Virologist	
Drew Gilpin Faust	1968	Twenty-eighth president of Harvard University, former dean of Radcliffe Institute	
Mary Peters Fieser	1930	Chemist and writer	
Mary Stuart Fisher		Radiologist	
Catherine Clarke Fenselau	1961	Chemist, pioneer in mass spectrometry	
Frances H. Flaherty	1905	Film writer and director	
Elizabeth Fox-Genovese	1963	Historian and conservative feminist	
Virginia Kneeland Frantz	1918	Pathologist and educator	
Shaun Gallagher	Ph.D.	University of Central Florida philosophy professor	
Julia Anna Gardner	1905 A.B., 1907 M.A.	Geologist, paleontologist	
Ashley Gavin	2010	Podcaster, comedian	
Martha A. Geer	1980	Associate justice of the North Carolina Court of Appeals	
Carolyn Goodman	1961	Mayor of Las Vegas, founder of the Meadows School	
Dorothy Goodman		Teacher, charter school advocate, founder of International Baccalaureate Organization	
Hanna Holborn Gray	1950	Former president of University of Chicago	
David Gress	Ph.D. 1981	Historian	
Eunice Groark	B.A. 1960	Politician	
Naomi Halas	M.A. 1984, Ph.D. 1986	Professor of Chemistry and Computer Engineering at Rice University	
Edith Hamilton	M.A. 1894	Classical scholar	
Jessica Todd Harper	B.A. 1997	Photographer	
Katharine Hepburn	1928	Academy Award-winning actress	
Katharine Martha Houghton Hepburn	1899	Suffragist and family planning advocate	
Hope Hibbard	Ph.D. c. 1921	Biologist, cytologist, zoologist, and zoology professor	
Carmelita Hinton	1912	Progressive educator	
Betsy Hodges	1991	Former mayor of Minneapolis	
Louise Holland	1920	Academic, philologist and archaeologist	
Jean Holzworth	A.B. 1936, Ph.D. 1940	Latin philologist, later veterinarian and expert on feline medicine	
Edith Houghton Hooker	1901	Suffragist	
Margaret Hoover	2001	Political contributor for CNN, media personality, and author; great-granddaughter of former U.S. President Herbert Hoover	
Matina Horner	1961	Former president of Radcliffe College and psychologist who pioneered the concept of "fear of success"	
Sari Horwitz	1979	Journalist and three-time Pulitzer Prize winner	
Beryl Howell	1978	Federal court judge, United States District Court for the District of Columbia	
Barbara Marx Hubbard	1951	Writer and public speaker	
Salima Ikram	1986	Egyptologist and professor at American University in Cairo	
Nina Jankowicz	2011	Disinformation expert at the Woodrow Wilson International Center for Scholars	
Sarah Jones	did not graduate	Actress, poet, playwright	
Deborah Kamen	1998	Chair and professor of classics at the University of Washington	
Angela Kane	c. 1970	German UN diplomat	
Rosabeth Moss Kanter	1964	Professor in business at Harvard Business School, former editor of the Harvard Business Review	
Michi Kawai	1904	Founder of Keisen University	
Emily Kimbrough	1921	Writer	
Helen Dean King	Ph.D. 1899	Biologist	
Anna Kisselgoff	1958	Cultural news reporter and former chief dance critic for the New York Times	
Karen Kornbluh	1985	Ambassador and U.S. permanent representative to the Organization for Economic Cooperation and Development	
Dorothy Meserve Kunhardt	1923	Children's author, best known for Pat the Bunny; both her daughters are also Bryn Mawr alumnae	
Gertrude Prokosch Kurath	1928	Dancer and dance researcher	
Leslie Kurke	1981	Professor of classics at University of California-Berkeley and MacArthur "genius grant" recipient in 1999	
Ellen Kushner	did not graduate	Fantasy writer	
Frederica de Laguna	1927	Anthropologist	
Ruth Langer	1981	Professor of Religion	
Anna B. Lawther	1897	Leader in the women's suffrage movement	
Mimi Lee	1943	Chemist and First Lady of Maryland 1977–1979	
Carol D. Leonnig	1987	Author, investigative journalist, staff writer at the Washington Post	
Marie Litzinger	1920	Mathematician	
Helen Taft Manning	1915	Historian, professor and dean of Bryn Mawr College, suffragist, daughter of President William Howard Taft	
Jacqueline Mars	1961	Heiress to Mars candy fortune	
Leslie Marshall		Journalist and novelist	
Berthe Marti	M.A. 1926, Ph.D. 1934	Professor of Latin at Bryn Mawr College	
Katharine McBride	A.B. 1925 M.A. 1927 Ph.D. 1932	Former president of Bryn Mawr College	
Millicent Carey McIntosh	1920	Head of the Brearley School and the first president of Barnard College; first married woman to head one of the Seven Sisters; was "considered a national role model for generations of young women who wanted to combine career and family," advocating for working mothers and for child care as a dignified profession	
Sarah McIntyre	1999	Children's book writer and illustrator	
Mary A. McLaughlin	M.A. 1969	Judge on the U.S. District Court for the Eastern District of Pennsylvania	
A. Thomas McLellan	M.S., Ph.D.	Professor at the University of Pennsylvania, nominee for deputy director of the Office of National Drug Control Policy	
Priscilla Johnson McMillan	M.A. 1950	Journalist, translator, author, historian	
Georgia L. McMurray	M.A. 1962	Activist and New York City administrator	
Mary Patterson McPherson	Ph.D.	Former president of Bryn Mawr College	
Ruth McVey	B.A. 1952	Co-author, Cornell Paper	
Lynne Meadow	1968	Theatrical producer and director	
Cornelia Meigs	1908	Newbery Medal winner in 1934	
Mary Meigs	1939	Writer	
Lucy Taxis Shoe Meritt	A.B. 1927, M.A. 1928, Ph.D. 1935	Classical archaeologist	
Agnes Kirsopp Lake Michels	A.B., M.A., Ph.D.	Classical scholar and former professor at Bryn Mawr College	
Marianne Moore	1909	Poet	
Margaret M. Morrow	1971	Judge on the U.S. District Court for the Central District of California	
Johanna Kroeber Mosenthal	1900	Paleontologist at the American Museum of Natural History	
Elizabeth Mosier	1984	Writer, author of My Life as a Girl	
Catherine Gilbert Murdock		Writer	
Emily Cheney Neville	1940	Newbery Medal winner in 1964	
Lindsay Northover, Baroness Northover		Member of the U.K. House of Lords	
Sherry Ortner	1962	Anthropologist, professor at UCLA, MacArthur Genius Grant recipient	
Diana Oughton	1963	Militant Weathermen member	
Ada Palmer	2001	Historian and author, professor at The University of Chicago	
Marion Edwards Park	A.B. 1898 M.A. 1899 Ph.D. 1918	Former president of Bryn Mawr College	
Judith Peabody		Socialite and philanthropist	
Candace Pert	1970	Neuroscientist	
Jeannette Piccard	1918	Teacher, scientist, balloon pilot, priest	
Bertha Putnam	1893	Historian	
Virginia Ragsdale	A.B., Ph.D.	Mathematician	
Paul Rehak	M.A. 1980, Ph.D. 1985	Archaeologist	
Sara Rittenhouse Brown		Professor, Occidental College	
Alice Rivlin	1952	Economist, first director of Congressional Budget Office	
Phyllis Ross		Economist, former chancellor of University of British Columbia	
Ilana Kara Diamond Rovner	1960	Judge on the Seventh Circuit Court of Appeals; first woman appointed to the Seventh Circuit	
Edith Finch Russell		Author, biographer of Bryn Mawr College President M. Carey Thomas	
Teresita Currie Schaffer	1966	Diplomat and former director of the Foreign Service Institute	
Dorothy Schiff	1921	Newspaper publisher	
Frances Schreuder	non-degreed	Convicted in 1983 of the 1978 Franklin Bradshaw murder that she forced her son, Marc, to perform	
Allyson Schwartz	M.A. 1972	U.S. representative	
Elaine Showalter	1962	Feminist literary critic and former president of the Modern Language Association	
Fatima Siad	2007	Contestant on America's Next Top Model, Cycle 10 and fashion model	
Maggie Siff	1996	Actress, Mad Men, Sons of Anarchy, Billions	
Rachel Simon	1981	Writer	
Cornelia Otis Skinner	did not graduate	Actress and author	
Joan Slonczewski	1977	Biology professor at Kenyon College, science fiction writer	
Gabrielle M. Spiegel	1964	Chair of the History Department at Johns Hopkins University, president of the American Historical Association, 2008–2009	
Deborah Spungen	M.S.W. 1989	Author	
Valerie Stanfill	1985	Chief justice of the Maine Supreme Judicial Court, 2021–	
Emma Dietz Stecher	Ph.D. 1929	Organic chemist and professor at Barnard College	
Nettie Stevens	Ph.D. 1903	Geneticist	
Caroline Stevermer	1977	Fantasy writer	
Marcia Storch	1971	Physician	
Nina Straight	1959	Author, journalist, and socialite	
Margaret Suckley	1912–14 (did not graduate)	First archivist of the Franklin D. Roosevelt Presidential Library and Museum	
Laurie Sweet	2002	Connecticut politician and member of the General Assembly of Connecticut	
Mary Hamilton Swindler	Ph.D. 1912	Former professor of archaeology of Bryn Mawr College	
Olga Taussky-Todd	Fellow	Mathematician	
Lily Ross Taylor	Ph.D. 1912	Former professor and dean of Bryn Mawr College	
Mary Elizabeth Taylor	2011	White House deputy director of Legislative Affairs of Nominations for President Donald Trump; Forbes 30 under 30 2018	
Martha Gibbons Thomas	1889	First woman elected to represent Chester County in the Pennsylvania House of Representatives	
Dorothy Burr Thompson	1923	Archaeologist and art historian	
Tony Thurmond	MSS 1995, MSLP 1996	Politician and member of the California State Assembly	
Adrian Tinsley	1958	Former president of Bridgewater State University	
Kaity Tong	1969	Broadcast journalist	
Anne Truitt	1943	Minimalist sculptor	
Umeko Tsuda	1889–1892	First Japanese student; founder of Tsuda College and first president of YWCA in Japan	
Neda Ulaby	1993	NPR reporter	
Genevieve Vaughan	1961	Philanthropist and feminist activist	
Emily Vermeule	A.B. 1950, Ph.D. 1956	Classical scholar, archaeologist, poet	
Elizabeth Gray Vining	1923	Newbery Medal winner	
P. Gregory Warden	M.A. 1976, Ph.D. 1978	President of Franklin University Switzerland	
Betty Peh T'i Wei	1953	Historian	
Katharine Sergeant Angell White	1914	Editor of The New Yorker	
Carola Woerishoffer	A. B. 1907	Labor activist, endowed Bryn Mawr social work program	
Rebecca Wood Watkin	A.B. 1933	Architect, housing activist, and community leader in the San Francisco Bay Area	
Mai Yamani	1979	Anthropologist and Saudi Arabian activist	
Rosemarie Said Zahlan	1958	Palestinian-American historian and writer	
Michelle Zauner	2011	Musician, known for her band Japanese Breakfast and author of Crying in H Mart	

== Notable faculty and administrators ==
- Gerald M. Ackerman, art historian, lecturer in art history (1959–1965)
- Constance Applebee, director of athletics (1904–1928); brought field hockey to the United States from Britain and established women's lacrosse as a collegiate sport
- Asoka Bandarage
- Florence Bascom, petrologist, founder of Bryn Mawr's Geology Department
- Marland Pratt Billings, structural geologist
- Rhys Carpenter, Classical Archaeology (1889–1980)
- Kimberly Wright Cassidy (born c. 1963), Psychology, ninth president of Bryn Mawr College
- Catherine Conybeare, professor of Classics
- Arthur C. Cope, chemist, developer of the Cope rearrangement and the Cope elimination, namesake of the Arthur C. Cope Award of the American Chemical Society (1934–1941)
- Maria Luisa Crawford, Geology, MacArthur Genius Grant recipient
- Donald Drew Egbert, Lecturer of Ancient Architecture (1930)
- Louis Fieser, chemist, developer of synthetic napalm, researcher of vitamin K (1925–1930)
- Michelle Francl, computational chemistry
- Alice M. Hoffman, labor and oral historian
- Howard S. Hoffman, Psychology (1925–2006), behavioral neuroscientist, leading scholar of the startle reflex and social attachment
- Louise Holland, academic, philologist and archaeologist
- Amy Kelly, headmistress, historian and best-selling author
- Susan Myra Kingsbury, historical economist and social researcher; director of the Social Economy and Social Research department
- Karl Kirchwey (born 1956), poet, associate professor from 2000 to present
- Frederica de Laguna, anthropologist and founder of Bryn Mawr's anthropology department (1906–2004)
- Mabel Lang, Greek (1943–1988); received her Ph.D. from Bryn Mawr in 1943
- Agathe Lasch, Germanic philologist (associate professor, 1910–16)
- Richmond Lattimore, Greek (1935–1971)
- Michael Krausz, Milton C. Nahm Professor of Philosophy
- Bettina Linn (1905–1962), English professor 1934–1962; novelist
- Helen Taft Manning, History (1917–1957), also served as dean
- Berthe Marti, Latin and French (1930–1963)
- Cornelia Meigs, English (1932–1950)
- Agnes Kirsopp Lake Michels, Latin (1934–1975)
- José Ferrater Mora, Philosophy (1949–1980)
- Thomas Hunt Morgan, geneticist and winner of the Nobel Prize in Physiology and Medicine (1866–1946)
- Emmy Noether, Mathematics (1933–1935)
- Jane M. Oppenheimer, Embryology and History of Science (1938–1980)
- John Oxtoby, Mathematics (1939–1979)
- Arthur Lindo Patterson, founder of the Patterson function used in X-ray crystallography (1936–1949)
- Brunilde Sismondo Ridgway, Archeology (1958–1994)
- Charlotte Scott, Mathematics (1885–1917)
- Hilda Worthington Smith, labor educator, social worker, and poet (1888–1984)
- Lily Ross Taylor, Latin (1927–1942), dean of the Graduate School (1942–52)
- M. Carey Thomas, English, dean of the college (1884–1908), president (1894–1922)
- Edward Warburg (1908–1992), taught Modern Art
- Harold Wethey, art historian
- Woodrow Wilson (1885–1888)

== Fictional alumni ==
- Pamela Abbott (A.B.), Inventing the Abbotts (1997), played by Liv Tyler
- C.C. Babcock, The Nanny (1993), played by Lauren Lane
- Erica Barry (A.B.), Something's Gotta Give lead character, played by Diane Keaton
- Amanda Bonner (A.B.), Adam's Rib (1949), played by Katharine Hepburn
- Betty Draper (A.B. in Anthropology), Mad Men (2007), played by January Jones
- Nancy Drew & Carolyn Keene, Confessions of a Teen Sleuth (book published in 2005)
- Jinx (A.B.) (1980s), a.k.a. Kim Arashikage (fictional character in the G.I. Joe: A Real American Hero toy line)
- Allison R. Hart-Burnett (A.B.) (1980s), Lady Jaye (fictional character in the G.I. Joe: A Real American Hero toy line)
- Edna Krabappel (M.A.), The Simpsons teacher
- Miriam "Midge" Maisel (B.A. in Russian Literature), The Marvelous Mrs. Maisel (2017), played by Rachel Brosnahan
- Vivian Schuyler (B.A.), The Secret Life of Violet Grant by Beatriz Williams
- Corinthians (A.B.), Song of Solomon (book published 1977)
