= Jane Dammen McAuliffe =

American educator and scholar of Islam (born 1944)

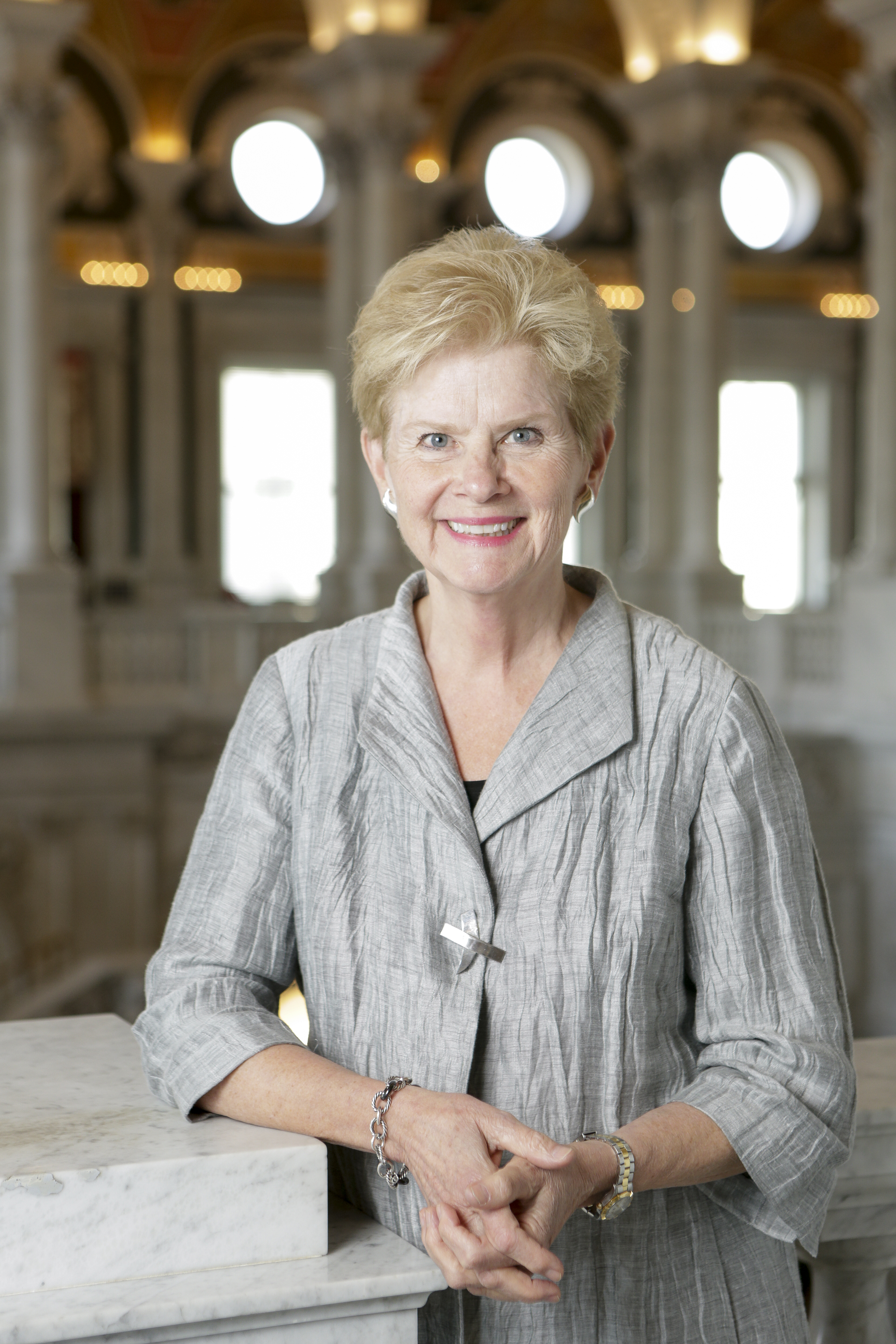
- McAuliffe in 2017

8th President of Bryn Mawr College
- In office 2008–2013
- Preceded by: Nancy J. Vickers
- Succeeded by: Kim Cassidy

Personal details
- Born: 1944 (age 81–82)
- Citizenship: American
- Education: Trinity College, Washington (BA); University of Toronto (MA, PhD)

Jane Dammen McAuliffe (born 1944) is an American educator, scholar of Islam and the inaugural director of national and international outreach at the Library of Congress.

She is a president emeritus of Bryn Mawr College and former dean of Georgetown College at Georgetown University. As a leading specialist in Quranic studies, McAuliffe has edited the six-volume Encyclopaedia of the Qurān and continues to lead the editorial team for the online edition of the work.

== Career ==
In 2015, she was appointed the inaugural director of national and international outreach, a newly created division of the Library of Congress. Prior to that, she served as the director of The John W. Kluge Center, the residential research center for scholars at the Library of Congress.

From 2008 to 2013, McAuliffe was president of Bryn Mawr College and, from 1999 to 2008, she was dean of Georgetown College at Georgetown University.

At Georgetown, she was a tenured professor in the Department of History and the Department of Arabic and Islamic Studies. McAuliffe held previous appointments at Emory University as professor and associate dean and at the University of Toronto as chair of the Department for the Study of Religion and professor of Islamic studies in the Department of Near and Middle Eastern Civilizations. She received her BA in philosophy and classics from Trinity College, Washington, D.C., and her MA in religious studies and PhD in Islamic studies from the University of Toronto.

== Contributions ==
McAuliffe contributes at both national and international levels to Muslim-Christian dialogue.

== Honors and awards ==
McAuliffe has been awarded fellowships by the Guggenheim Foundation, the Rockefeller Foundation and the National Endowment for the Humanities. She is an elected member of the American Philosophical Society, the Council on Foreign Relations and the American Academy of Arts and Sciences. She is also the recipient of several honorary degrees: Trinity Washington University, University of Toronto, and University of Notre Dame.

== Positions ==
University of the People (Member of President's Council)

== Publications ==
Books:

- (2017) The Qur’an: A Norton Critical Edition (New York: W.W. Norton). ISBN 9780393927054, OCLC 990002253
- (2015). Norton Anthology of World Religions: Islam (New York: W W Norton).
- (2006). Cambridge Companion to the Qur’an (Cambridge: Cambridge University Press).
- (2001-2006). Encyclopaedia of the Qur'an. General Editor. (Leiden: Brill Academic Publishers). Six volumes.
- (2002). With Reverence for the Word: Medieval Scriptural Exegesis in Judaism, Christianity and Islam. Co-editor with Joseph Goering and Barry Walfish. (New York: Oxford University Press). ISBN 9780195137279, OCLC 47091867
- (1995). Abbasid Authority Affirmed: The Early Years of al-Mansur. Translation, introduction and annotation of vol. 28, Ta’rikh al-rusul wa al-muluk. (Albany: State University of New York Press).
- (1991). Qur’anic Christians: An Analysis of Classical and Modern Exegesis. (New York: Cambridge University Press).

Peer-reviewed articles, book chapters and encyclopedia entries:

- "Exegesis." In the Encyclopedia of Islamic Political Thought, edited by Gerhard Böwering. Princeton: Princeton University Press, 2013.
- "People of the Book." Forthcoming in the Encyclopedia of Islamic Political Thought, edited by Gerhard Bowering. Princeton: Princeton University Press, 2013.
- "How Did You End Up in Islamic Studies?" In Christian Lives Given to the Study of Islam, edited by Christian W. Troll, S.J. and C.T.R. Hewer, 219–228. New York: Fordham University Press, 2012.
- "Al-Ahzab 33:35; Al-Rum 30:21; al-Nisa’ 4:34; al-Baqara 2:228." In Humanity, Texts and Contexts: Christian and Muslim Perspectives, edited by Michael Ipgrave and David Marshall, 102-105. Washington, DC: Georgetown University Press, 2011.
- "Connecting Moses and Muhammad." In The Old Testament in Byzantium, edited by Paul Magdalino and Robert Nelson. 279–298. Washington, DC: Dumbarton Oaks Research Library, 2010.
- "Al-Tabari's Prelude to the Prophet." In Al-Tabari: A Medieval Muslim Historian and His Work, edited by Hugh N. Kennedy, 113–129. Princeton: Darwin Press, 2008.
- "The Tasks and Traditions of Interpretation." In Cambridge Companion to the Qur’an, edited by J. McAuliffe, 181–209. Cambridge: Cambridge University Press, 2006.
- "Exegetical Sciences." In Blackwell Companion to the Qur’an, edited by A. Rippin, 403–419. London: Blackwell Publishing, 2006.
- "Monitoring for Religious Freedom: A New International Mandate." In the Commission for Religious Relations with Muslims, Religious Liberty: A theme for Christian-Muslim Dialogue, 151–183. Vatican City: Pontifical Council for Interreligious Dialogue, 2006.
- "Reading the Qur’an with Fidelity and Freedom." In Journal of the American Academy of Religion 73 (2005) 615–635. "The Persistent Power of the Qur’an." Proceedings of the American Philosophical Society 147 (2003) 339–346.
- "The Prediction and Prefiguration of Muhammed." In Bible and Qur’an: Essays in Scriptural Intertexuality, edited by J. Reeves, 107–131. Atlanta: Society of Biblical Literature, 2003.
- "Disparity and Context: Teaching Qur’anic Studies in North America." In Teaching Islam, edited by B. Wheeler, 94-107. New York: Oxford University Press, 2002.
- "Is there a Connection between the Bible and the Qur’an?" Theology Digest 49 (2002) 303–317.
- "The Islamic Legal Tradition: An Overview." In Canon Law Society of America, Proceedings of the Sixty-fourth Annual Convention, Cincinnati, Ohio, October 7–10, 2002, pp. 177–190. Washington, DC: Catholic University of America, 2002.
- "The Genre Boundaries of Qur’anic Exegesis." With Reverence for the Word: Medieval Scriptural Exegesis in Judaism, Christianity and Islam, edited by J. McAuliffe, J. Goering and B. Walfish, 445–461. New York: Oxford University Press, 2002.
- "Legal Exegesis: Christians as a Case Study." In How Islam Views Christianity, edited by L. Ridgeon, 54–77. London: Curzon Press, 2001.
- "Text and Textuality: Q.3:7 as a Point of Intersection." In Literary Structures of Religious Meaning in the Qur’an, edited by I. Boullata, 56–76. London: Curzon Press, 2000.
- "Rendering Allegiance to the Word: Qur’anic Concepts and Contemporary North American Concerns." In Religion et politique: Un theme pour le dialogue islamo-chretien, 13–36. (Vatican City, C.R.R.M., 1999).
- "Debate with them in the better way": The Construction of a Qur'anic Commonplace." In Aspects of Literary Hermeneutics in Arabic Culture: Myths, Historical Archetypes and Symbolic Figures in Arabic Literature. Beiruter Texte und Studien, edited by A. Neuwirth, S. Gunther, M. Jarrar, 163-188. Wiesbaden: Franz Steiner, 1999.
- "Christians in the Qur’an and tafsir." In Muslim Perceptions of Other Religions Throughout History, edited by J. Waardenburg, 105–121. New York: Oxford University Press, 1999
- "Assessing the Isra’iliyyat: An Exegetical Conundrum." In Story-telling in the Framework of Nonfictional Arabic Literature, edited by S. Leder, 345–369. Wiesbaden: Harrassowitz Verlag, 1999.
- "Ibn Taymiyyah's Muqaddimatun fi usul al-tafsir." In Windows on the House of Islam: Muslim Sources on Spirituality and Religious Life, edited by J. Renard, 35–43. Berkeley: University of California Press, 1998.
- "The Qur’anic Context of Muslim Biblical Scholarship." Islam and Christian-Muslim Relations 7 (1996) 141–158.
- "Islam (authoritative texts and their interpretation)." In The Harper-Collins Dictionary of Religion, edited by J. Z. Smith and W. S. Green, 514–518. San Francisco: Harper San Francisco, 1995. "Rizk." In The Encyclopaedia of Islam, 8:567-568. New edition. Leiden: E.J. Brill, 1954-.
- "The Abrogation of Judaism and Christianity in Islam. A Christian Perspective." Concilium (1994/3) 154–163. (Simultaneous publication in English, French, German, Dutch, Italian and Spanish).
- "Fakhr al-Din al-Razi on God as al-khaliq." In God and Creation: An Ecumenical Symposium, edited by D. Burrell and B. McGinn, 276–96. Notre Dame: University of Notre Dame Press, 1990.
- "Fakhr al-Din al-Razi on ayat al-jizyah and ayat al-sayf." In Conversion and Continuity: Indigenous Christian Communities in Islamic Lands, Eighth to Eighteenth Centuries, edited by M. Gervers and R. Bihkazi, 103–19. Toronto: Pontifical Institute of Mediaeval Studies, 1990.
- "Moments of Delight and Disappointment: Islamic Studies in The Encyclopedia of Religion." Critical Review of Books in Religion 1989, 57–76. Atlanta: Scholars Press, 1989.
- "Ibn al-Jawzi's Exegetical Propaedeutic: Introduction and Translation [of the muqaddimah to Zad al-masir fi ‘ilm al-tafsir]." Alif: Journal of Comparative Poetics 8 (1988) 101–13.
- "Qur’anic Hermeneutics: The Views of al-Tabari and Ibn Kathir." In Approaches to the History of the Interpretation of the Qur’an, edited by A. Rippin, 46–62. Oxford: Clarendon Press, 1988.
- "Aishah bint Abi Bakr." In The Encyclopedia of Religion, edited by Mircea Eliade, 1:162-63. New York: Macmillan, 1986.
- "Fatimah bint Muhammad." In The Encyclopedia of Religion, edited by Mircea Eliade, 7:298-99. New York: Macmillan, 1986.
- "Wines of Earth and Paradise: Qur’anic Proscriptions and Promises." In Logos Islamikos, edited by R. M. Savory and D. A. Agius, 159–74. Toronto: Pontifical Institute of Mediaeval Studies, 1984.
- "Persian Exegetical Evaluation of the ahl al-kitab." The Muslim World 73 (1983) 87-105.
- "Exegetical Identification of the Sabi’un." The Muslim World 72 (1982) 95-106.
- "Chosen of All Women: Mary and Fatima in Qur’anic Exegesis." Islamochristiana 7 (1981) 19–28.

Academic offices
Preceded by Nancy J. Vickers	President of Bryn Mawr College; 2008—2013	Succeeded by Kimberly Wright Cassidy
Preceded by Robert B. Lawton, S.J.	Dean of Georgetown College; 1999—2008	Succeeded by Chester Gillis
