= Mary Stuart Fisher =

American physician

Mary Stuart Fisher (August 12, 1922 – April 24, 2006) was an American radiologist who won the Marie Curie Award of the American Association for Women Radiologists. She spent the majority of her career as a professor of radiology at Temple University.

== Early life ==
Mary Blakely was born on August 12, 1922, in Binghamton, New York, to Stuart Banyar Blakely and Miriam Brothers Blakely. After graduating from Bryn Mawr College and finishing first in her class, she went on to study medicine at Columbia University College of Physicians and Surgeons, again finishing first in her class in 1948. Her father, a medical doctor himself, had wanted his daughter to become a nurse rather than a medical doctor, but Blakely persisted with her choice of a medical career with her mother's encouragement. Soon after graduating M.D., Blakely married George R. Fisher III, a classmate from medical school.

== Career ==
Fisher worked as an intern at Boston's Massachusetts General Hospital and completed her residency in radiology at New York City's Presbyterian Hospital. She then spent a year as a fellow with Groover, Christie & Merritt Radiology, a private radiology practice located in Washington, D.C. Her first position as a fully qualified radiologist was at the Veterans Administration Hospital in Philadelphia, where she worked for eight years before moving to Philadelphia General Hospital for 15 years. In 1975, when Philadelphia General Hospital closed, one of her former residents who was by now working as head of diagnosis at Temple University recruited her to Temple. She remained at Temple University as a professor of radiology until her retirement in 2003.

== Awards and honors ==
During her tenure at Temple University, Fisher received multiple faculty awards, including the Russell P. Moses Memorial Award for Excellence in Clinical Teaching (1980), the "Golden Apple" award nominated by medical students for their favorite teacher (1990), and Physician of the Year (1996). She received the Marie Curie Award, the highest honor given by the American Association for Women Radiologists, in 1992.
