= Marion Edwards Park =

President of Bryn Mawr College

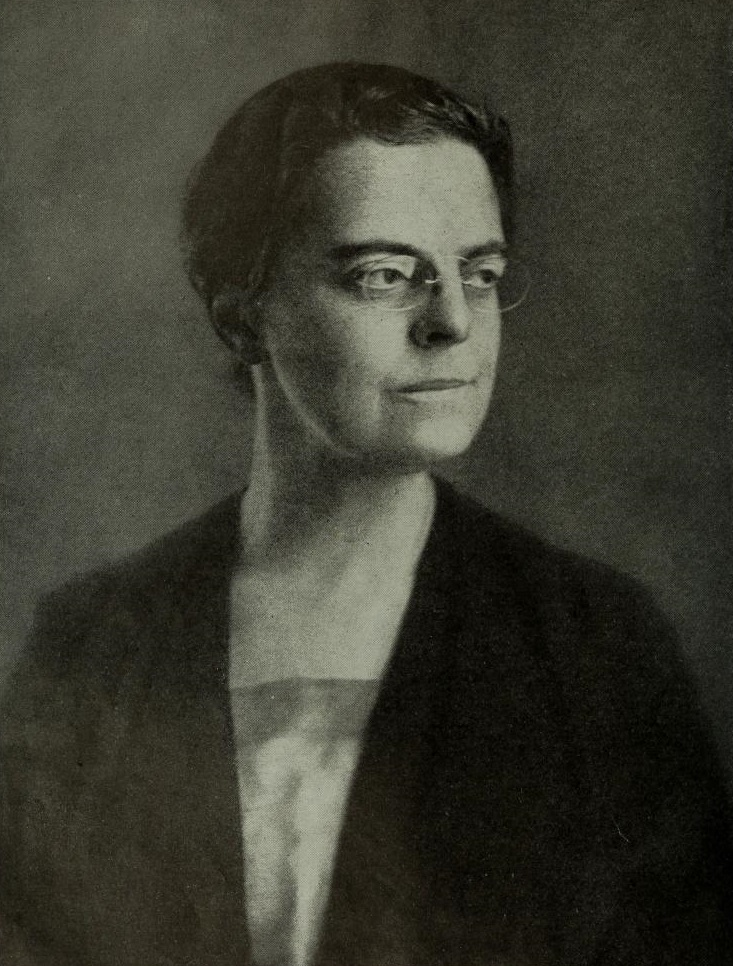

3rd President of Bryn Mawr College
- In office 1922–1942
- Preceded by: M. Carey Thomas
- Succeeded by: Katharine Elizabeth McBride

Personal details
- Born: 1875
- Died: 1960 (aged 84–85)
- Citizenship: American
- Education: Bryn Mawr College (B.A., M.A., Ph.D.)

Academic work
- Discipline: Classics and English
- Institutions: President of Bryn Mawr College (1922 – 1942); Dean of Radcliffe College (1921-1922); instructor and acting dean at Colorado College; acting dean of Simmons College (1918-1921); acting dean Bryn Mawr College (1911)

Marion Edwards Park (1875–1960) was an American academic administrator who was the third president of Bryn Mawr College, her alma mater, following alumna M. Carey Thomas.

== Biography ==
Park was born in Gloversville, New York, in 1875. Her brother, Dr. E. A. Park, was head of the department of pediatrics at Yale University.

During her tenure as a student at Bryn Mawr College, she received the Bryn Mawr European Fellowship and used it to attend the American School of Classical Studies in Athens, Greece. Park presided over the college during the Great Depression and the beginning of World War II, where she worked with other colleges to employ refugee scholars from European universities. Park was also instrumental in initiating cross-institution collaboration between Bryn Mawr College, Haverford College, Swarthmore College, and the University of Pennsylvania.

She died in 1960.

== Publications ==
"The plebs in Cicero’s day, a study of their provenance and of their employment", Cambridge, Massachusetts, The Cosmos Press, 1921
