= Agnes Kirsopp Lake Michels =

American classical scholar (1909–1993)

Agnes Freda Isabel Kirsopp Lake Michels (July 31, 1909 – November 30, 1993, in Chapel Hill, North Carolina) known as "Nan" to her friends, was a leading twentieth century scholar of Roman religion and daily life and a daughter of the Biblical scholar Kirsopp Lake (1872–1946).

Michels earned her bachelor's, master's and doctoral degrees in Latin from Bryn Mawr College, where she was also a member of the faculty from 1934 until 1975. After her retirement she frequently taught courses at Duke University as well as at the University of North Carolina.

She spent time in Rome as a Fellow of the American Academy in the company of Lily Ross Taylor in 1933. Michels was president of the American Philological Association for 1971–72. During her career, Roman religion was the focus of her research. It led to her landmark book, still consulted by scholars as a work of authority, The Calendar of the Roman Republic (Princeton, 1967).

A series of lectures offered at Bryn Mawr College celebrates Michels and her work.

Michels was married to physicist Walter Christian Michels (1906-1975). She is buried in Radnor, Pennsylvania.

== Publications ==
- 1935. Campana Supellex, the pottery deposit at Minturnae. Ph.D. thesis, Bryn Mawr College.
- 1935. "The archaeological evidence for the 'Tuscan temple'". Memoirs of the American Academy in Rome 12:89-149.
- 1937. "The supplicatio and Graecus Ritus." In Quantulacumque; studies presented to Kirsopp Lake by pupils, colleagues and friends, 243–251.
- 1949. "The 'Calendar of Numa' and the Pre-Julian Calendar." Transactions and Proceedings of the American Philological Association 80:320–346. doi:10.2307/283524.
- 1953. "The Topography and Interpretation of the Lupercalia." Transactions and Proceedings of the American Philological Association 84:35–59. doi:10.2307/283397.
- 1955. "Death and Two Poets." Transactions and Proceedings of the American Philological Association 86:160-179.
- 1967. The Calendar of the Roman Republic. Princeton, N.J.: Princeton University Press.
- 1997. "The Many Faces of Aeneas." Classical Journal 92.4:399-416.

== Necrology ==
- Scott, Russell T. "Obituary". Bryn Mawr Classical Review. Archived from the original on March 6, 2000.

== Sources ==
- Biography and bibliography written by Jerzy Linderski, "Agnes Kirsopp Michels and the Religio." Classical Journal 92.4 (1997) 323-345.
