= Poggio Colla =

Etruscan archaeological site in Tuscany, Italy

- Location within Tuscany
- 43°55′27″N 11°28′48″E
- Periods: Iron Age to Hellenistic
- Cultures: Etruscan
- Location: Vicchio, Province of Florence, Tuscany, Italy
- Region: Tuscany

Site notes
- Excavation dates: yes
- Archaeologists: P. Gregory Warden
- Condition: ruined
- Website: Mugello Valley Archaeological Project

Poggio Colla is an Etruscan archaeological site located near the town of Vicchio in Tuscany, Italy.

== History ==
The site of Poggio Colla contains well-preserved layers of habitation that are associated with the Etruscan civilization. It is believed that the site was inhabited by the Etruscans as early as the 7th century BCE. However, it was eventually abandoned or destroyed by the late 3rd century BCE. The site experienced a period of violent destruction but was later rebuilt during the Hellenistic period.

== Excavation ==
The first excavations at Poggio Colla were directed by Francesco Nicosia from 1968 to 1972. From 1995 to 2012, the site was excavated annually by the Mugello Valley Archaeological Project (MVAP) under the direction of Gregory Warden and Michael Thomas; MVAP is sponsored by Southern Methodist University and the University of Pennsylvania. Excavations have revealed fortification walls, a necropolis area, and the remains of an archaic monumental building (possibly, a temple).

== Research ==
The faunal remains recovered from Poggio Colla primarily contains the remains of cattle, sheep/goat and pig, as well as the remains of dog and wild species. The relative importance of pigs increases over time; this trend is linked to the intensification of meat production and rising urban populations. Similar faunal assemblages have been found in other Etruscan settlements.

A black-glaze olpe filled with one hundred Roman silver victoriati was discovered in 2001 in the west end of the Poggio Colla acropolis. The significance of the finding is that it is found in the context of a sanctuary and it was buried after the sanctuary was destroyed in the late 3rd century BCE.

The use of a rounded molding on the base of monumental tombs, temples, and altars is the characteristic of Etruscan architecture; and it was consistent between the 6th and the 2nd century BCE in different Etruscan cities. A large number of such moldings were discovered in Poggio Colla; the large single or double round fits into the known pattern of Etruscan architecture.

A large number of roof tiles of the monumental structure on the Poggio Colla acropolis and workshop/farmhouse of Podere Funghi have been discovered during ongoing excavation. A geochemical study has been done in an attempt to characterize the composition of ceramics, tiles and the local sediments discovered at the site of Poggio Colla. Using methods like X-ray, petrography, thermogravimetric analysis, macroscopic observations, it is found that typical pottery sherds and tile fragments constituent of abundant quartz, feldspar, minor amount of mica, lithic, and grog. The compositions of tiles and pottery of Poggio Colla and Podere Funghi are similar, but the rock and sediment specimens were different; which supports the hypothesis that diverse ceramic industry co-existed in close proximity to Poggio Colla acropolis.

Paleoethnobotanical studies have been done at Poggio Colla to identify the plants utilized by the Etruscans; this could provide potential information about Etruscan diet and common plants used in weaving. The soil samples from features and stratum, are floated to obtain botanical remains, which includes modern roots, charcoal, whole seeds, and seed fragments. Thus far, the identified seeds include cereal, mainly barley, wheat, broad beans, chickpeas, and grape pips. This is an ongoing research of MVAP.

== Findings ==
This excavation resulted in two highly significant archaeological discoveries: a stone stele "evidence of a permanent religious cult with monumental dedications, at least as early as the Late Archaic Period, from about 525 to 480 B.C. Its re-use in the foundations of a slightly later sanctuary structure points to deep changes in the town and its social structure.". The stele itself is 226.8 kg, and roughly 1.2 m in height, with approximately 120 Etruscan characters along the sides in “pseudo boustrophedic” flow, making the stele the source of one of the longest inscriptions in the Etruscan language, which has eluded comprehension from scholars since its initial discovery. The parts of the inscription that could be transcribed attest to the goddess Uni being the primary recipient of worship and sacrifice at the Poggio Colla sacred site, but also mention her consort, the god Tinia. The head archaeologist, Gregory Warden, stated that “the slab was discovered embedded in the foundations of a monumental temple where it had been buried for more than 2,500 years. At one time it would have been displayed as an imposing and monumental symbol of authority.”

The second significant discovery was the birth-stamp; a small image of a woman giving birth that was found on a shard of bucchero pottery. The image shows the head and shoulders of a baby emerging from the mother, who is represented with her face in profile, with one arm raised, thought to be holding on to possibly a tree for support. The artifact’s closest Etruscan iconographic parallels—the scenes found on the Archaic relief slabs from Tarquinia—illustrate a crouching female but without the baby. Additional Etruscan scenes combine the crouching pose with a range of animals, suggesting an association with the “Mistress of the Animals.” A survey of the few related images from around the Mediterranean not only establishes the rarity of childbirth images in the classical world but also the uniquely Etruscan character of the shard’s imagery. When its context—a redeposited occupation stratum of a settlement dated to the end of the Orientalizing period—is assessed in conjunction with its iconography, it becomes possible to view the stamp’s imagery as alluding to concepts of fertility and reproduction tied to the power of nature and regeneration, all of which would have been appropriate in an Etruscan banqueting context attended by elite men and women.

1. Etruscan Studies. Volume 16, Issue 1, Pages 75–105, ISSN (Online) 2163-8217, ISSN (Print) 1080-1960, DOI: 10.1515/etst-2013-0001, May 2013
2. Etruscan Studies. Volume 15, Issue 1, Pages 19–93, ISSN (Online) 2163-8217, ISSN (Print) 1080-1960, DOI: 10.1515/etst-2012-0001, May 2012

== Bibliography ==
- Aterini, B., A. Nocentini, and P.G Warden 2017. "Digital Technologies for the Documentation, Analysis, and Dissemination of the Etruscan ‘Stele di Vicchio.'" In New Activities for Cultural Heritage, edited by M. Ceccarelli et al., 158-165. Springer. New York 2017.
- Camporeale, G. 2012. "Ager Faesulanus, Poggio Colla." Rivista di Epigrafia Etrusca. Studi Etruschi 75:187-188.
- Castor, Alexis Q. “AN EARLY HELLENISTIC JEWELRY HOARD FROM POGGIO COLLA (VICCHIO DI MUGELLO).” Memoirs of the American Academy in Rome, vol. 54, 2009, pp. 245–262. JSTOR, www.jstor.org/stable/25750542. Accessed 5 Apr. 2021.
- Colonna, G. 2015. "Ager Faesulanus. Poggio Colla (Vicchio)." Rivista di Epigrafia Etrusca. Studi Etruschi 78: 223-224.
- Curri, A. 1976. "Vicchio di Mugello (Firenze). Saggi esplorativi nell’acropoli etrusca del Poggio di Colla." Notizie degli Scavi di Antichità: 92-112.
- Fasti Online Site Name Poggio Colla Location: Vicchio di Mugello
- Fedeli, L. and P.G. Warden. 2006. "Recenti scavi a Poggio Colla (Vicchio)." Notiziario della Soprintendenza per i Beni Archeologici della Toscana 2: 334-337.
- Gleba, M. 2003. "Report on Excavations at Poggio Colla." In “Archaeology in Etruria 1995-2002. Archaeological Reports 49 (2002-2003) 96.
- KANE,, SUSAN, WARDEN,, P. G. and GRIFFITHS,, NICK. "A BRONZE HEAD OF A YOUTH FROM POGGIO COLLA (VICCHIO), TUSCANY" Etruscan Studies, vol. 5, no. 1, 1998, pp. 63–68. https://doi.org/10.1515/etst.1998.5.1.63
- Maggiani, Adriano. "The Vicchio Stele: The Inscription" Etruscan Studies, vol. 19, no. 2, 2016, pp. 220–224. https://doi.org/10.1515/etst-2016-0018
- Meyers, Gretchen E. “Women and the Production of Ceremonial Textiles: A Reevaluation of Ceramic Textile Tools in Etrusco-Italic Sanctuaries.” American Journal of Archaeology, vol. 117, no. 2, 2013, pp. 247–274. JSTOR, www.jstor.org/stable/10.3764/aja.117.2.0247. Accessed 5 Apr. 2021.
- Meyers, G., L.M. Jackson, and J. Galloway. 2010. The Production and Usage of non-decorated Etruscan roof-tiles, based on a case study from Poggio Colla. Journal of Roman Archaeology 23: 303-319.
- Nocentini, A. 2016. La stele etrusca di Vicchio, metodologie di rilievo per un’iscrizione da svelare. Testo di Dottorato di Ricerca, Università degli Studi di Firenze, Dipartimento di Architettura DIDA.
- Nocentini, A., and P.G. Warden. 2017. Il santuario di Poggio Colla: dalla ricerrca archeologica all rapresentazione digitale, testimonianze per il rituale etrusco. In Territori e Frontiere della Rappresentazione, edited by A. Di Lucco et al., 1025-1032. Gangemi International, Roma.
- Perkins, P. 2012. The Bucchero Childbirth Stamp on a Late Orientalizing Period Shard from Poggio Colla. Etruscan Studies 15 (2): 146-201.
- Sternberg, R., and S. Bon Harper. 2011. Intra-site testing using magnetometry and shovel test pits in the Podere Funghi near Poggio Colla (Florence, Italy). In Proceedings of the 37th International Symposium on Archaeometry, edited by I. Memmi, 657662. Heidelberg: Isabella.
- Thomas, M.L. 2000a. An Imitative Unsealed Semis from Northern Etruria. American Journal of Numismatics 12: 113-118.
- Thomas, M.L. 2000b. The Technology of Daily Life in a Hellenistic Etruscan Settlement. Etruscan Studies 7: 107-108.
- Thomas, M.L. 2001. Excavations at Poggio Colla (Vicchio di Mugello): A Report of the 2000-2002 Seasons. Etruscan Studies 8: 119-130.
- Thomas, M.L. 2012. One Hundred Victoriati from the Sanctuary at Poggio Colla (Vicchio di Mugello): Ritual Contexts and Roman Expansion. Etruscan Studies 15.1: 19–93.
- Trentacoste, A. 2013. Faunal Remains from the Etruscan Sanctuary at Poggio Colla. Etruscan Studies 16.1: 75-105.
- Van der Graaff, I., R. Vander Poppen, and T. Nales. 2010. The advantages and limitations of coring survey: An initial assessment of the Poggio Colla Coring Project. In TRAC 2009: Proceedings of the Nineteenth Annual Theoretical Roman Archaeology Conference, edited by Alison Moore, Geoff Taylor, Emily Harris, Peter Girdwood and Lucy Shipley, Oxford.
- Vander Poppen, R.E. 2013. Evidence from Flaws: Hellenistic Pottery Technology at Podere Funghi (Vicchio di Mugello),” Etruscan Studies 16.2: 165-189.
- Warden P.G. and S. Kane. 1997. Excavations at Poggio Colla (Vicchio) 1995-1996. Etruscan Studies 4: 159-186.
- Warden, P.G. 1995. Southern Methodist University Excavations in Tuscany, 1995. A Preliminary Report for Friends and Supporters. Dallas.
- Warden, P.G. 1997. Southern Methodist University Excavations at the Etruscan Site of Poggio Colla (Vicchio di Mugello). The 1997 Season. Dallas and Philadelphia.
- Warden, P.G. 1998. Excavations at the Etruscan Site of Poggio Colla (Vicchio di Mugello). The 1998 Season. Philadelphia.
- Warden, P.G. 2007. Vicchio (FI). Poggio Colla. Campagna di scavo 2006. Notiziario della Soprintendenza per i Beni Archeologici della Toscana 3: 38-40.
- Warden, P.G. 2008. Vicchio (FI). Recenti scavi (2008) a Poggio Colla. Notiziario della Soprintendenza per i Beni Archeologici della Toscana 4: 402-405.
- Warden, P.G. 2009a. Remains of the Ritual at the Sanctuary of Poggio Colla. In Votives, Places, Rituals in Etruscan Religion. Studies in Honor of Jean MacIntosh Turfa, edited by M. Gleba and H. Becker. Religion in the Graeco-Roman World (RGRW), Leiden: 121-127.
- Warden, P.G. 2009b. Vicchio (FI). Recenti scavi (2008) a Poggio Colla. Notiziario della Soprintendenza per i Beni Archeologici della Toscana 4 (Firenze, Soprintendenza Archeologica Toscana): 402-405.
- Warden, P.G. 2010a. The Temple is a Living Thing: Fragmentation, Enchainment, and the Reversal of Ritual at the Acropolis Sanctuary of Poggio Colla. In The Archaeology of Sanctuaries and Ritual in Etruria, edited by Nancy de Grummond, chapter 4, 55-67. Supplementary volume to the Journal of Roman Archaeology.
- Warden, P.G. 2010b. Poggio Colla: campagne di scavo 2009 e 2010. Notiziario della Soprintendenza per i Beni Archeologici della Toscana 6: 218-222.
- Warden, P.G. 2011. Poggio Colla: campagna di scavo 2011. Notiziario della Soprintendenza per i Beni Archeologici della Toscana 7: 219-222.
- Warden, P.G. 2012a. Monumental Embodiment: Somatic Symbolism and the Tuscan Temple. Monumentality in Etruscan and Early Roman Architecture: Ideology and Innovation. Festschrift in Honor of Ingrid Edlund Berry, edited by M. L. Thomas and G. Meyers, pp. 82–110. The University of Texas Press, Austin.
- Warden, P.G. 2012b. Giving the Gods their Due: Ritual Evidence from Poggio Colla. With an appendix by Angela Trentacoste. In Francesco Nicosia. L’archeologo e il soprintendente. Scritti in memoria. Notiziario della Soprintendenza per i Beni Archeologici della Toscana, Supplemento 1 al n. 8/12, 249-257. Firenze: Soprintendenza Archeologica Toscana.
- Warden, P.G. 2016a. The Vicchio Stele and Its Context. Etruscan Studies 19.2: 208-219.
- Warden, P.G. 2016b. Ritual Contexts at the Sanctuary of Poggio Colla (Vicchio di Mugello). In Dalla Valdelsa al Conero. Ricerche di archeologia e topografia storica in ricordo di Giuliano De Marinis. Florence
- Warden, P.G. 2016c. Una scoperta recente: la stele iscitta del santuario etrusco di Poggio Colla (Vicchio). In L’ombra degli etruschi. Simboli di un popolo tra pianura e collina, edited by P. Perazzi, G. Poggesi, and S. Sarti, 71-74. Edifir, Firenze.
- Warden, P.G. and M.L. Thomas. 1999. Excavations at Poggio Colla: The 1998 Season. Etruscan Studies 6: 111-22.
- Warden, P.G., A. Steiner, M. Thomas, and G. Meyers. 2009. Poggio Colla. In Museo Archeologico Comprensiorale del Mugello e Val di Sieve, edited by L. Cappuccini, C. Ducci, S. Gori, L. Paoli, 62-80. Firenze: Aska.
- Warden, P.G., and M.L. Thomas. 2000. Excavations at Poggio Colla: the 1999 Season. Etruscan Studies 7: 133-143.
- Warden, P.G., and M.L. Thomas. 2002-2003. Sanctuary and settlement: archaeological work at Poggio Colla (Vicchio di Mugello). Etruscan Studies 9-10: 97-108.
- Warden, P.G., M.L. Thomas, A. Steiner, and G. Meyers. 2005. The Etruscan Settlement of Poggio Colla (1998-2004 excavations). Journal of Roman Archaeology 18: 252-266.
- Warden, P. Gregory, Michael L. Thomas, and Jess Galloway. “The Etruscan Settlement of Poggio Colla (1995-98 Excavations).” Journal of Roman Archaeology 12 (1999): 231–46. doi:10.1017/S1047759400018006.
- Warden, P.G., S. Kane, K. Vellucci, and D. White. 1996. Southern Methodist University Excavations at the Etruscan Site of Poggio Colla (Vicchio di Mugello). The 1996 Season. Dallas and Philadelphia.
- Weaver, I, G.E. Meyers, S.A. Mertzman, R. Sternberg, and J. Didaleusky. 2016. Geochemical Evidence for Integrated Ceramic and Roof Tile Industries at the Etruscan Site of Poggio Colla, Italy. Mediterranean Archaeology and Archaeometry 13.1: 31-43.
