= Katharine Elizabeth McBride =

American academic (1904-1976)

4th President of Bryn Mawr College
- In office 1942–1970
- Preceded by: Marion Edwards Park
- Succeeded by: Harris L. Wofford

Personal details
- Born: May 14, 1904 Philadelphia, Pennsylvania, U.S.
- Died: June 3, 1976 (aged 72)
- Resting place: West Laurel Hill Cemetery, Bala Cynwyd, Pennsylvania, U.S.
- Occupation: Psychology professor

Katharine Elizabeth McBride (May 14, 1904 - June 3, 1976) was an American academic in the field of psychology who conducted and published research on aphasia. She served as the fourth president of Bryn Mawr College from 1942 to 1970.

== Early life and education ==
McBride was born May 14, 1904, in Philadelphia, Pennsylvania, to Thomas Canning McBride and Sally Hulley Neals. She was raised in the Germantown neighborhood and attended the Stevens School and Germantown Friends School. She received her A.B. cum laude in 1925 and her M.A. in psychology in 1927 from Bryn Mawr College. She studied for one year in a graduate program in neurology at Columbia University. She worked in Philadelphia hospitals and conducted research on language and thinking disturbances in patients. She returned to Bryn Mawr College and received her doctorate in psychology in 1932.

=== Aphasia study ===
While a graduate student at Bryn Mawr College, McBride's dissertation advisor was James Leuba, the founder of Bryn Mawr's psychology research lab. In 1929, McBride was invited by neurologist, Dr. Theodore Weisenberg, to join an aphasia study. McBride had recently collaborated with Dr. Agnes Rogers, and Dr. Rogers recommended McBride to Dr. Weisenburg for the study. The study was funded, spanned five years and focused on the classification and assessment of aphasia in adults.

The aphasia study included 230 patients and healthy adults, including 60 patients with aphasia. The study was monumental because it was the first aphasia study to use normal controls, to compare patients with and without aphasia, and to use standardized methodology.

McBride and Weisenberg were influenced by Henry Head's (1926) work on aphasia and his process for testing patients with aphasia. McBride used a subset of Head's individual tests for their assessment battery, but also supplemented the tests by adding measures of reading, writing, mathematics, and language intelligence. She also added a subset of non-language tests to the battery. In total, McBride and Weisenberg's battery for aphasia included tasks that assessed word repetition, naming, automatic word sequences, understanding spoken language, reading, writing, sentence completion, understanding analogies and opposites, digit and letter span, and sound recognition. The average length of the battery was 19 hours for aphasia patients and only 10 to 15 hours for controls.

Only weeks after the final manuscript of the book was sent to the Commonwealth Fund in New York City for publication, Weisenberg died. McBride did not continue research in clinical neuropsychology and instead switched her focus to educational psychology.

== Career ==
In 1935, McBride was a lecturer at Bryn Mawr in the Education department. She also worked in local schools to provide guidance center and clinic services. In 1936, she was appointed assistant professor of education and psychology. In 1938, she was appointed associate professor and an assistant Dean at Bryn Mawr. In 1940, she left Bryn Mawr to become the Dean at Radcliffe College and worked closely with Ada Comstock. In 1942, McBride became the fourth president of Bryn Mawr College. She was one of the youngest people to be named the president of an American university and one of the few female presidents of American colleges at the time.

As President, she advocated for her students by turning down government scholarship programs that required universities to report student protesters during the Vietnam War. In McBride's first year as president, she taught Child Psychology and co-led the Psychology Journal Club. McBride also was the Vice President of the College of Entrance Examination Board and Chair of the Committee on Tests. Even though not technically a practicing neuropsychologist, McBride continued to value standardization, confront measurement issues and develop test instruments.

McBride developed the Child Study Institute, a clinical, educational service that in present-day serves as a mental-health services center. She also oversaw the construction of the Mariam Coffin Canaday Library, Erdman Hall, Haffner Hall, and additions to the Park Science Center. In 1960, she was awarded the M. Carey Thomas Award by the Bryn Mawr Alumnae Association.

She served on the Committee on Education Beyond High School by President Dwight D. Eisenhower and the National Science Foundation by President John F. Kennedy. She served as chair of the College Entrance Examination Board from 1949 to 1952 and on the board of trustees for the Educational Testing Service from 1949 to 1964. She served as chair of the American Council on Education from 1955 to 1956 and on the Carnegie Foundation Commission on the Future of Higher Education from 1967 to 1973.

McBride was an active member of the American Psychological Association, the American Association for Applied Psychology, and the American Association of University Women. She was elected a Fellow of the American Academy of Arts and Sciences in 1968.

McBride made a televised appearance on ABC News Issues and Answers program on September 19, 1965. To a national audience, she espoused her beliefs in equality in higher education, and that greater assistance was needed for disadvantaged individuals to even the playing field in higher education.

McBride died June 3, 1976, at Bryn Mawr Hospital after a heart attack. She was interred at West Laurel Hill Cemetery in Bala Cynwyd, Pennsylvania.

== Legacy ==
The "McBride Scholars" program was established in 1984. The Scholarship supports nontraditional, female college students who delayed college due to economic or family issues. The McBride Gateway in front of Pembroke Hall at Bryn Mawr College was erected in 1984 to honor Katharine McBride. A chapter of The Oxford Handbook of History of Clinical Neuropsychology was devoted to Katharine McBride's contributions, and the author stated, "It can be argued that McBride was one of the best neuropsychologists we never had. Overall, she is considered to be a pioneering figure among early aphasia clinicians and researchers who founded the field of clinical neuropsychology.

== Works ==
- McBride, K. E. (1932). A psychological study of aphasia. Unpublished dissertation, Bryn Mawr College.
- Weisenburg, T. H., Roe, A., & McBride, K. E. (1936). Adult Intelligence: A Psychological Study of Test Performances. New York, NY: The Commonwealth Fund.
- McBride, K. E. (1941). Henry Head: 1861–1940. The American Journal of Psychology, 54, 444–446.
- McBride, K. E. (1950). Review of "Language and language disturbances: Aphasic symptom complexes and their significance for medicine and the theory of language." Journal of Abnormal and Social Psychology, 45, 404–405.
- Weisenburg, T. H., & McBride, K. E. (1964). Aphasia: A Clinical and Psychological Study. New York, NY: Hafner Publishing Company.
- McBride, K. E. (1972). Higher Education and the Pace of Change (Vol. 1971). [Pittsburgh]: University of Pittsburgh Press.
