= Donald Drew Egbert =

American art historian

- Born: May 12, 1902; Norwalk, Connecticut, United States
- Died: January 3, 1973 (aged 70); Princeton, New Jersey, United States
- Occupations: Art historian Educator
- Spouse: Virginia Grace Wylie (m. 1946-1973)
- Awards: Haskins Medal (1943)

Academic background
- Education: Princeton University
- Doctoral advisor: Charles Rufus Morey

Academic work
- Discipline: Art history
- Sub-discipline: Architectural history
- Institutions: Princeton University; Bryn Mawr College
- Notable students: Neil Levine; Robert Venturi

Donald Drew Egbert (May 12, 1902 – January 3, 1973) was an American art historian and educator, who taught for many years at Princeton University.

== Career ==
Born in Norwalk to George Drew and Kate Estelle Powers, Egbert graduated from Princeton University with a Bachelor of Arts in 1924 and a Master of Architecture in 1927. He pursued a Doctor of Philosophy there, as well, but never completed it, studying under Charles Rufus Morey.

Egbert first began teaching as an instructor of art history and archaeology at Princeton in 1929, and a year later, as a lecturer in ancient architecture at Bryn Mawr College. At this time, Egbert was a scholar of medieval art, but maintained a strong interest in American architecture. In 1935, Egbert was hired as Assistant Professor at Princeton. In 1943, he was awarded the fourth-ever Haskins Medal by the Medieval Academy of America for his work on studying the Tickhill Psalter, which helped to earn him a promotion to Associate Professor in the following year. In 1946, Egbert was yet again promoted to Professor of Art, Archeology, and Architecture, and married the art historian Virginia Grace Wylie. In 1968, Egbert's position was endowed and he became the Howard Crosby Butler Memorial Professor of the History of Architecture, retiring in 1970 and becoming emeritus. He died only three years later in Princeton.

A major contribution by Egbert to art history was his book titled Social Radicalism and the Arts, Western Europe: A Cultural History from the French Revolution to 1968 in 1970. The publication was one of the first surveys of radical political agendas in the history of Western art.

== See also ==
- List of Bryn Mawr College people
- List of people from Norwalk, Connecticut
- List of Princeton University people
