= Wendy Cadge =

American sociologist and academic administrator

10th President of Bryn Mawr College
- Incumbent
- Assumed office July 1, 2024
- Preceded by: Kimberly Wright Cassidy

Personal details
- Born: November 27, 1976 (age 49) Delaware County, Pennsylvania, U.S.
- Spouse: Deborah
- Children: 2
- Education: Swarthmore College (BA); Princeton University (MA, PhD)

Wendy Cadge (born c. 1976) is an American sociologist and academic administrator serving as the tenth president of Bryn Mawr College since 2024. She was previously dean of the Brandeis University Graduate School of Arts and Sciences.

== Early life and education ==
Cadge was born c. 1976 in Delaware County, Pennsylvania. She received a B.A. in religion and sociology & anthropology from Swarthmore College in 1997. She earned a M.A. (2000) and Ph.D. (2002) in the department of sociology at Princeton University. She completed a two-year postdoctoral fellowship at Harvard University.

== Career ==
Cadge began her academic career at Bowdoin College, where she served as a faculty member from 2003 to 2006. She later joined Brandeis University, where she held several prominent roles, including senior associate dean for strategic initiatives, chair of the women's, gender, and sexuality program, and leader of the division of social sciences. Cadge worked there for eighteen years, becoming the Barbara Mandel Professor of the Humanistic Social Sciences and a professor of sociology. In 2020, she was appointed dean of the Brandeis University Graduate School of Arts and Sciences. During her tenure, Cadge focused on enhancing the graduate student experience by expanding professional development opportunities, advancing the school's anti-racism plan, and collaborating to extend degree programs. On July 1, 2024, she became the 10th president of Bryn Mawr College, succeeding Kimberly Wright Cassidy.

Cadge's scholarly work spans multiple topics related to religion in public institutions, including spiritual care and the role of chaplaincy in healthcare. She has authored three books: Paging God: Religion in the Halls of Medicine, Spiritual Care: The Everyday Work of Chaplains, and Heartwood: The First Generation of Theravada Buddhism in America. In 2018, Cadge founded the Chaplaincy Innovation Lab to support and advance the work of chaplains in spiritual care settings. Philip Schwadel, a professor of sociology at the University of Nebraska-Lincoln, cites Cadge's Paging God as "an important contribution to the religion and health literature".

== Personal life ==
Cadge and her wife have two children, three pugs, two cats, and a frog.

== Selected works ==
- Cadge, Wendy (2005). Heartwood: The First Generation of Theravada Buddhism in America. University of Chicago Press. ISBN 978-0-226-08900-3.
- Cadge, Wendy (2012). Paging God: Religion in the Halls of Medicine. University of Chicago Press. ISBN 978-0-226-92210-2.
