= Gerhard Böwering =

German Islamic studies scholar

Gerhard Böwering is a German academic, currently Professor of Islamic Studies within the Department of Religious Studies, Yale University. He was elected to the American Philosophical Society in 1994. He was awarded a Guggenheim Fellowship in 2005 following his "formative influence of al-Sulami's commentary on the Qur'an."

== Academic career ==
Böwering was previously an academic at University of Pennsylvania, Philadelphia.

=== God and his Attributes ===
Professor Böwering was an author of articles in the Encyclopaedia of the Quran including Chronology and the Quran and God and his Attributes.

Sahih Bukhari Hadith recorded that Abu Hurairah reported that God has ninety-nine names (99 Attributes of Allah). Böwering refers to Chapter 17 of the Quran (al isrāʼ) (17:110) as the locus classicus to which explicit lists of the names used to be attached in Qur'anic exegesis (tafsir).

According to Böwering,

They are traditionally enumerated as 99 in number to which is added as the highest Name (al-ism al-ʾaʿẓam), the Supreme Name of Allāh. The locus classicus for listing the Divine Names in the literature of Qurʾānic commentary is 17:110 “Call upon Allah, or call upon The Merciful; whichsoever you call upon, to Allah belong the most beautiful Names,” and also 59:22-24, which includes a cluster of more than a dozen Divine epithets."

— Gerhard Böwering, God and God's Attributes

According to Böwering, in contrast with pre-Islamic Arabian polytheism, God in Islam does not have associates and companions, nor is there any kinship between God (Allah) and jinn.

== Publications ==
- The Mystical Vision of Existence in Classical Islam. Berlin-New York, 1980.
- The Comfort of the Mystics: A Manual and Anthology of Early Sufism. Brill, Leiden, 2013.
- The Princeton Encyclopedia of Islamic Political Thought (editors: Gerhard Böwering, Patricia Crone and Mahan Mirza). Princeton University Press, 2013, ISBN 978-0-691-13484-0.
- The Minor Qur’an Commentary of al-Sulami, Beirut, 1995, 2nd ed., 1997.
- Sufi Inquiries and Interpretations, Beirut, 2010.
- Sufi Treatises, Beirut, 2009.
