= American Association for Women in Radiology =

Professional association

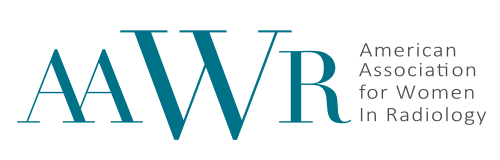
- Formation: 1981; 45 years ago
- Website: www.aawr.org

The American Association for Women in Radiology (or AAWR) is a professional association founded in 1981 as a resource for "professional socialization" for women in a male-dominated field of radiology.

AAWR's role model is Marie Curie.

The main goals of the association were to provide a forum for issues unique to women in radiology, radiation oncology and related professions, to sponsor programs that promote opportunities for women, and to facilitate networking among women radiologists.
