= Madeline Early =

American mathematician (1912–2001)

Madeline Levin Early
- Born: Madeline Levin; April 1, 1912; Brooklyn, New York
- Died: January 20, 2001 (aged 88); Ann Arbor, Michigan
- Burial place: Fort Custer National Cemetery
- Education: Hunter College; Bryn Mawr College; Hunter-Bellevue School of Nursing
- Occupations: Mathematician and university professor
- Spouse: Harold Early
- Children: 1

Madeline Levin Early (April 1, 1912 – January 20, 2001) was an American mathematician and university professor. She was one of the few American women to be awarded a PhD in math before World War II.

== Biography ==
Madeline Levin was born April 1, 1912 in Brooklyn, New York, the youngest child of Dora (Siegal) and Hyman Levin. She was the Russian immigrants' youngest of seven children. She attended public schools in New York City and studied mathematics at Hunter College, where she was a member of Pi Mu Epsilon, graduating magna cum laude. She received her bachelor 's degree there in 1932 and then studied at Bryn Mawr College where she earned a master's degree in 1933. She received her doctorate in 1936 under William Welch Flexner with the dissertation An Extension of the Lefschetz Intersectional Theory. After Madeline received her doctorate, she returned to Hunter College as an instructor.

During the early years of World War II, she took a military leave of absence to attend the Hunter-Bellevue School of Nursing (Brookdale Campus) and earned a bachelor's degree in nursing from the affiliated New York University. In March 1945, she was appointed to the rank of ensign in the Naval Reserve and from 1945 to 1947, she served in the Navy at the U.S. Naval Hospital St. Albans on Long Island and later on the island of Guam.

After her discharge from the Navy in March 1947, she used the benefits she received from the G.I. Bill, to do post-doctoral study at the University of Michigan during the 1947–1948 school year, and there she met her future husband Harold C. Early. In 1956, Madeline became an assistant professor at Eastern Michigan University in Ypsilanti, and was promoted to associate professor in 1959, and full professor in 1967. She retired in 1975.

Madeline Early died January 20, 2001 in Ann Arbor, Michigan, and was buried in the Fort Custer National Cemetery in Battle Creek, Michigan.

== Personal life ==
In 1949, Madeline Levin married fellow mathematician Harold C. Early, and changed her name to Madeline Early. They had a son, Robert Early, in 1951. The couple divorced in 1958.

== Selected publications ==
- 1934: Levin, M.; Flexner, W. W.: The intersection of arbitrary chains and its boundary. Proc. Natl. Acad. Sci. USA 20.
- 1937: Levin, M.: An extension of the Lefschetz intersection theory. Rev. Cienc. (Univ. Nac. Mayor San Marcos, Lima) 39.

== Memberships ==
Organizational affiliations, according to Green.

- American Mathematical Society
- American Association of University Professors
- Phi Beta Kappa
- Pi Mu Epsilon
