= Encyclopaedia of the Qurʾān =

Reference work on the Quran

Encyclopedia of the Qurʾān
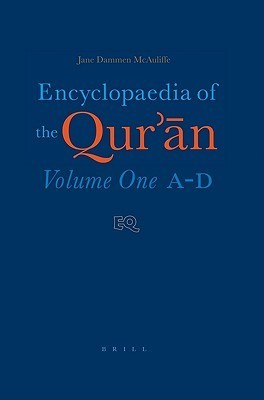
- Encyclopaedia of the Qurʾān Volume One A–D
- Editors: Jane Dammen McAuliffe
- Publication date: 2001-2006
- ISBN: 90-04-14743-8

The Encyclopaedia of the Qurʾān (abbreviated EQ) is an encyclopedia in the field of Quranic studies, edited by Jane Dammen McAuliffe and published by Brill. It is published on the Internet as Encyclopaedia of the Qurʾān Online (EQO).

It was published in five volumes during 2001-2006:

- Vol. I: A-D (publication year 2001)
- Vol. II: E-I (2002)
- Vol. III: J-O (2003)
- Vol. IV: P-Sh (2004)
- Vol. V: Si-Z (2006)
- Index Vol. (2006)

== See also ==
- Encyclopaedia of Islam
- Encyclopaedia Iranica
