= P. Gregory Warden =

Patrick Gregory Warden
- Born: November 28, 1950; Florence, Tuscany, Italy
- Other name: P. Gregory Warden
- Education: University of Pennsylvania (B.A.); Bryn Mawr College (M.A. and PhD)
- Occupations: archaeologist, professor of archeology at Southern Methodist University, University of Pennsylvania, Bowdoin College, and the University of Texas at Arlington. President and Professor of Archaeology at Franklin University Switzerland

P. Gregory Warden (born November 28, 1950) is an American archaeologist, former president and Professor of archaeology at Franklin University Switzerland, and expert on Etruscan art, archaeology, and ritual, Roman architecture and Greek archaeology. He is the inaugural Mark A. Roglán Director of the Custard Institute for Spanish Art and Culture at Southern Methodist University.

== Biography ==
Born in Florence, Tuscany, to William Burnand and Franca Warden. He completed a BA at the University of Pennsylvania, and an MA and a PhD at Bryn Mawr College. He is University Distinguished Professor Emeritus at Southern Methodist University. He taught at the University of Pennsylvania, Bowdoin College, and the University of Texas at Arlington. He has taught with the honors, Meadows Foundation Distinguished Teaching Professor, University Distinguished Professor, and also Altshuler Distinguished Teaching Professor at Southern Methodist University.

Warden's academic work is in Etruscan and Roman archaeology. He founded and co-directs Mugello Valley Archaeological Project (MVAP), which primarily works on the north Etruscan site of Poggio Colla, where twenty-one years of excavation have uncovered a sanctuary and settlement.

Warden is an elected foreign member to the Istituto Nazionale di Studi Etruschi ed Italici, Vice President of the Board of Trustees of the Etruscan Foundation, a member of the governing board of the Archaeological Institute of America.

== Publications ==
=== Books ===
- 1985 The Metal Finds from Poggio Civitate (Murlo) 1966-1978
- 1990 The Extramural Sanctuary of Demeter and Persephone at Cyrene, Libya. Final Reports IV (with Andrew Oliver, Pam J. Crabtree, and Janet Monge)
- 1997 Classical and Near Eastern Bronzes in the Hilprecht Collection, Philadelphia
- 2004 Greek Vase Painting: Form, Figure, and Narrative. Treasures of the National Archaeological Museum in Madrid (editor)
- 2008 From the Temple and the Tomb. Etruscan Treasures from Tuscany (editor)
- 2018 Anque Sacre, culto Etrusco sull'Appennino Toscano. Consiglio Regionale della Toscana, Florence. (editor with Alessandro Nocentini and Susanna Sarti)

=== Book chapters ===
- 2012 "Monumental Embodiment: Somatic Symbolism and the Tuscan Temple". In Monumentality in Etruscan and Early Roman Architecture: Ideology and Innovation
- 2012 "Pinning the Tale on the Chimera of Arezzo: The Monster as Ritual Sacrifice". In Myth, Allegory, Emblem: The Many Lives of the Chimera of Arezzo
- 2013 "The Importance of Being Elite: The Archaeology of Identity in Etruria (500-200 BCE)". In A Companion to the Archaeology of the Roman Republic
- 2016 "Communicating with the Gods: Sacred Space in Etruria". In A Companion to the Etruscans
- 2017. "ll santuario di Poggio Colla: dalla ricerca archeologica alla rappresentazione digitale, testimonianze per il rituale etrusco". In Territori e Frontiere della Rappresentazione (with A. Nocentini)
- 2020. "Authority and Display in the Sixth-Century Etruria: the Vicchio Stele". In Roman Law Before the Twelve Tables: An Interdisciplinary Approach (with Adriano Maggiani)
