= Kimberly Wright Cassidy =

President of Bryn Mawr College

Kim Cassidy
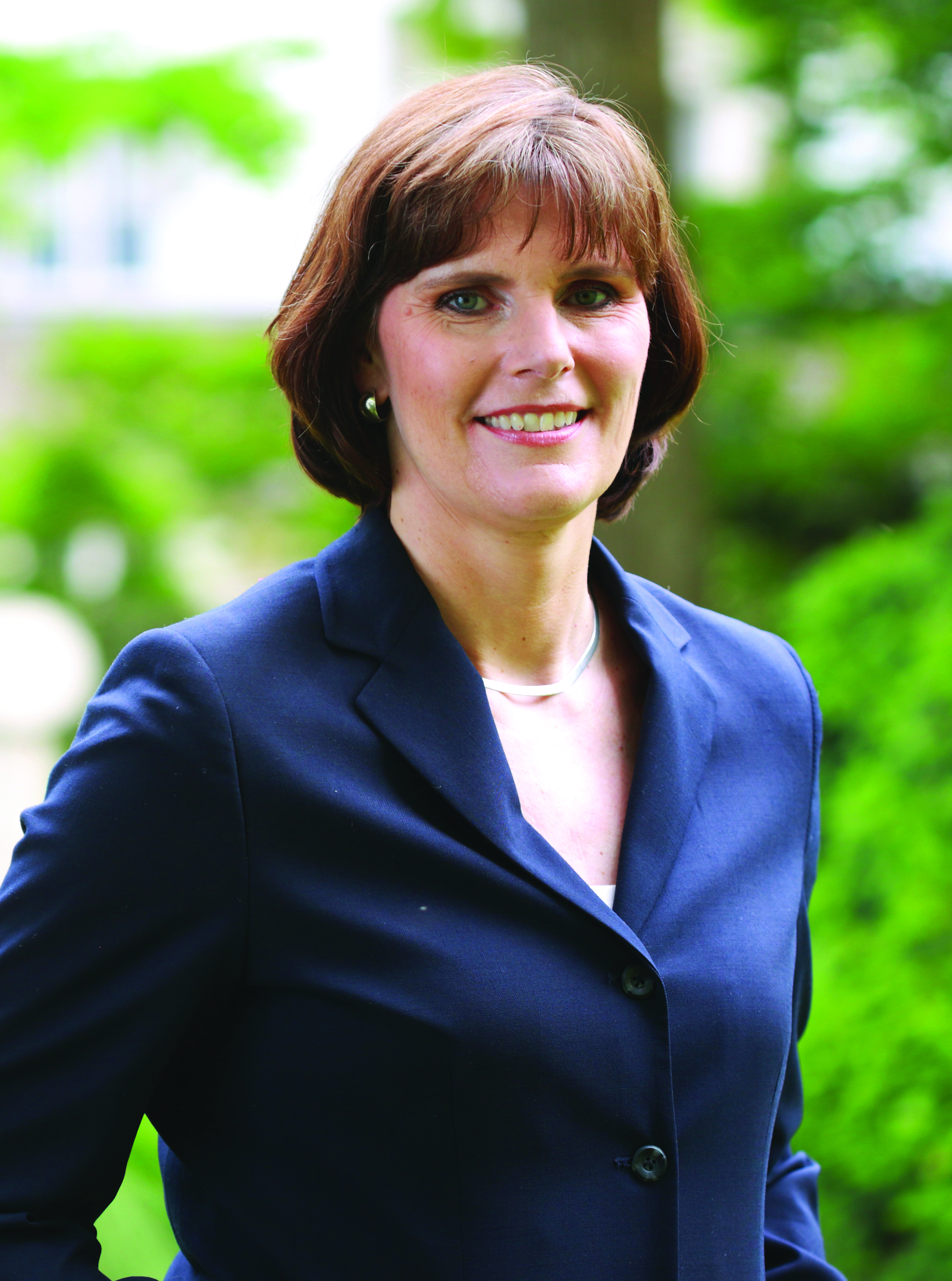
- Cassidy in 2000

9th President of Bryn Mawr College
- In office June 30, 2013 – 2024
- Preceded by: Jane Dammen McAuliffe
- Succeeded by: Wendy Cadge

Personal details
- Born: 1963 (age 62–63) Pennsylvania, U.S.
- Education: Swarthmore College (BA); University of Pennsylvania (MA, PhD)

Kimberly Wright Cassidy (born 1963) is an American psychologist. She was named the ninth president of Bryn Mawr College on February 12, 2014 and was formally inaugurated on September 20, 2014. She had served as interim president since Jane Dammen McAuliffe ended her term as president on June 30, 2013.

== Education ==
Cassidy received her master's degree and Ph.D. in psychology from the University of Pennsylvania and earned a bachelor's degree with distinction in psychology from Swarthmore College.

== Career ==
Cassidy joined the Bryn Mawr faculty in the Department of Psychology in 1993, and was Chair of Bryn Mawr's Department of Psychology from 2004 to 2007. She was the Provost from 2007 until she became the Interim President on July 1, 2013.

== Selected works ==
- Hirsh-Pasek, Kathy; Kemler Nelson, Deborah G.; Jusczyk, Peter W.; Cassidy, Kimberly Wright; Druss, Benjamin; Kennedy, Lori (1987). "Clauses are perceptual units for young infants". Cognition. 26 (3): 269–286. doi:10.1016/S0010-0277(87)80002-1. ISSN 0010-0277. PMID 3677573. S2CID 31433274.
- Nelson, Deborah G. Kemler; Hirsh-Pasek, Kathy; Jusczyk, Peter W.; Cassidy, Kimberly Wright (2009). "How the prosodic cues in motherese might assist language learning". Journal of Child Language. 16 (1): 55–68. doi:10.1017/S030500090001343X. ISSN 0305-0009. PMID 2925815. S2CID 2682574.
- Cassidy, Kimberly Wright; Kelly, Michael H. (1991). "Phonological information for grammatical category assignments". Journal of Memory and Language. 30 (3): 348–369. doi:10.1016/0749-596X(91)90041-H. ISSN 0749-596X.
- Cassidy, Kimberly Wright; Werner, Rebecca Stetson; Rourke, Mary; Zubernis, Lynn S.; Balaraman, Geetha (2003). "The Relationship Between Psychological Understanding and Positive Social Behaviors". Social Development. 12 (2): 198–221. doi:10.1111/1467-9507.00229. ISSN 0961-205X.
