= Lily Ross Taylor =

American historian and author (1886–1969)

- Born: August 12, 1886; Auburn, Alabama, U.S.
- Died: November 18, 1969 (aged 83); Bryn Mawr, Pennsylvania, U.S.
- Occupations: Classical scholar and ancient historian
- Years active: 1906-1969
- Known for: The Voting Districts of the Roman Republic: The Thirty-five Urban and Rural Tribes (1960)

Lily Ross Taylor (August 12, 1886 – November 18, 1969) was an American academic and author, who in 1917 became the first female Fellow of the American Academy in Rome.

== Biography ==
Born in Auburn, Alabama, Lily Ross Taylor developed an interest in Roman studies at the University of Wisconsin–Madison, earning an A.B. in 1906. She went to Bryn Mawr College as a graduate student that year, and received her Ph.D. in Latin in 1912. Her dissertation advisor was Tenney Frank. From 1912 until 1927, she taught at Vassar, and, in 1917, she became the fourth female Fellow of the American Academy in Rome.

In 1927, Taylor became a professor of Latin and the chairman of that department at Bryn Mawr. She rose to become dean of the graduate school there in 1942. That same year, she served as president of the American Philological Association, and in 1947 as first female scientist she was named Sather Professor in the University of California. From 1943 to 1944, during World War II, she was the principal social science analyst in the Office of Strategic Services. In 1945, she was elected as a member of the American Philosophical Society. She was elected a Fellow of the American Academy of Arts and Sciences in 1951.

Retiring from Bryn Mawr in 1952, she remained active as professor-in-charge of the Classical School of the American Academy in Rome, and as a member at the Institute for Advanced Study in Princeton, New Jersey. That year, she received the Achievement Award from the American Association of University Women.

She trained numerous graduate students while at Bryn Mawr, notably Irene Rosenzweig (1931), Berthe Marti (1934), Agnes Kirsopp Lake Michels (1934), and Beryl Rawson (1961).

She was killed by a hit-and-run driver in Bryn Mawr, Pennsylvania, on November 18, 1969.

== Bibliography ==
- The Cults of Ostia (dissertation) (Bryn Mawr College Monograph Series, vol. 11). Bryn Mawr, Pennsylvania: Bryn Mawr College, 1912. Pp. vii + 98.
- Local Cults in Etruria (Papers and Monographs of the American Academy in Rome, vol. 2). Rome: American Academy in Rome, 1923. Pp. xi + 258 + fold-out map.
- The Divinity of the Roman Emperor (Philological Monographs, vol. 1). Middletown, Connecticut: American Philological Association, 1931. Pp. xv + 296.
- Party Politics in the Age of Caesar (Sather Classical Lectures, vol. 22). Berkeley and Los Angeles, California, 1949.
- The Voting Districts of the Roman Republic: The Thirty-five Urban and Rural Tribes (Papers and Monographs of the American Academy in Rome, vol. 20) Rome: American Academy in Rome, 1960. Re-issued with new material authored by Jerzy Linderski, 2013.
- Roman Voting Assemblies: From the Hannibalic War to the Dictatorship of Caesar (Jerome Lectures, vol. 8). Ann Arbor, Michigan: University of Michigan Press, 1966.

== Students ==
- 1931 Irene Rosenzweig, The ritual and cults of pre-Roman Iguvium.
- 1933 A. L. Abaecherli. The institution of the imperial cult in the western provinces of the Roman empire .
- 1935. C.E. Goodfellow. Roman citizenship; a study of its territorial and numerical expansion from the earliest time to the death of Augustus. T.R.S. Broughton}
- 1934 A. Kirsopp Lake Michels. Campana supellex: the pottery deposit at Minturnae. {co-directed with L.A. Holland}
- 1934. B. M. Marti. The adoration of the Roman emperor from Augustus to Charlemagne.
- 1937 R. E. Deutsch. The pattern of sound in Lucretius.
- 1939. S. M. Savage. The cults of ancient Trastevere.
- 1939 J. I. M. Tait. Philodemus' influence on the Latin poets.
- 1940 D. Tolles. The banquet-libations of the Greeks.
- 1940 H. E. Russell (later White). Insignia of office as rewards in the Roman Republic: Advancement in rank under the Roman republic as a reward for the soldier and the public prosecutor.
- 1951 M.W. Hoffman. The membership of the four major colleges of priests from 44 B.C. to 37 A.D. {co-directed with T.R.S. Broughton}
- 1952 L. E. Hoy. Political influence in Roman prosecutions, 75 B.C. to 60 B.C.: with a listing of the trials.
- 1961 B. M. Rawson The names of children in Roman imperial epitaphs: a study of social conditions in the lower classes.

== Sources ==
- Broughton, T.R.S., in Briggs, W.W., and W.M. Calder III (eds.), Classical Scholarship: A Biographical Encyclopedia (New York and London 1990) pp. 454–461; and in Briggs, Jr., Ward W. (ed.) Biographical Dictionary of North American Classicists (Greenwood Press: Westport, Connecticut and London, 1994) pp. 636–638.
- Bryn Mawr Alumnae Bulletin (Winter 1981), adapted from the entry by Michels, Agnes Kirsopp in Sicherman, Barbara, and Carol Hurd Green (eds.), Notable American Women: The Modern Period (Cambridge, Massachusetts: Harvard University Press, 1980)
- http://sofaarome.wordpress.com/2009/10/12/from-the-town-of-ciciliano-in-lazio-a-notable-tribute-to-lily-ross-taylor-faar18/
