= Sara Rittenhouse Brown =

Sara Rittenhouse Brown Ph.D.
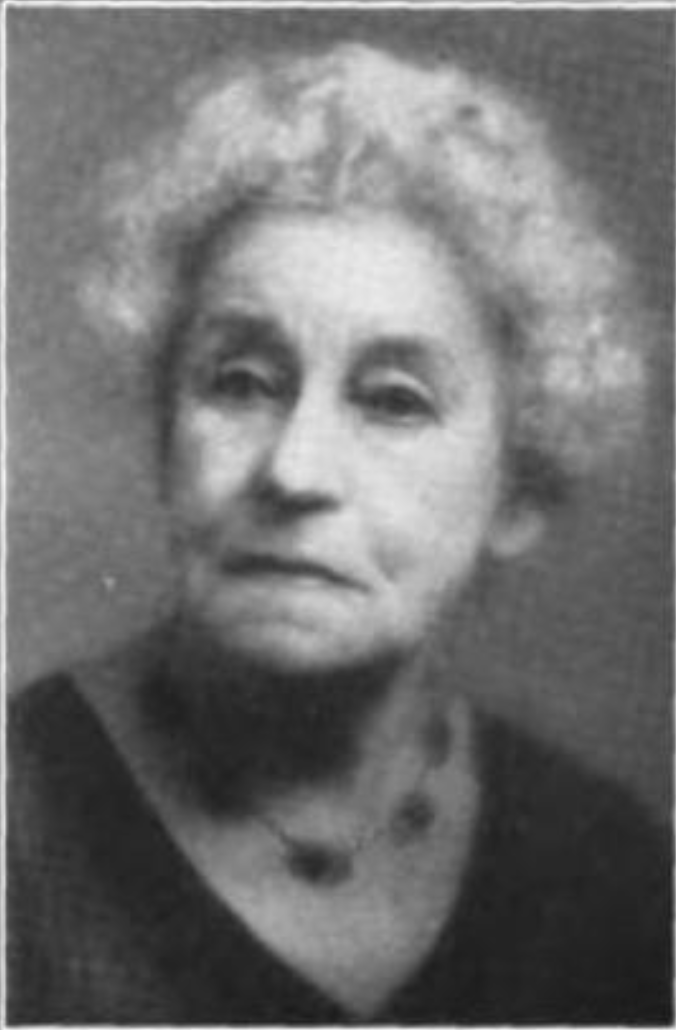
- Rittenhouse Brown in Who's Who in Los Angeles County, 1920
- Born: Sara Paterson Brown; 1863; Charlottesville, Virginia, U.S.
- Died: April 20, 1938 (aged 74–75); Santa Monica, California, U.S.
- Occupation: Professo
- Known for: Theory of the correlation of music and linguistics as kindred modes of self-expression.
- Spouse: Dwight Rittenhouse (m. 1897)

Academic background
- Education: Bryn Mawr College; Stuttgart Conservatory of Music

Academic work
- Institutions: Occidental College
- Notable works: English Grammar Blue Book

Sara Rittenhouse Brown (née Brown; surname after marriage, Rittenhouse Brown; 1854-1938) was an America professor, author, and musician from Virginia. She was educated in the United States and Germany before settling in Los Angeles. In addition to teaching at various colleges, Rittenhouse Brown founded and directed several educational institutions, and authored The English Grammar Blue Book (1912). She was especially known for her theory of the correlation of music and linguistics as kindred modes of self-expression.

== Early life and education ==
Sara Paterson Brown was born in Charlottesville, Virginia in 1863. Her parents were Rev. John Allen and Amanda (Christy) Brown.

She had her first instruction in piano from her mother, who had been taught by Ehrlich and Kullak. At the age of eight, she began studying with Henri Lippert of the University of Virginia. At twelve, Brown went to Boston for piano with William Hall Sherwood and organ with George Whiting. She was a graduate of Pennsylvania College for Women (now Chatham University), and post-graduate of Bryn Mawr College. She spent two years at Stuttgart Conservatory of Music. In Leipzig, she studied with Carl Reinecke (three years), and had harmony training with Ernst Richter.

== Career ==
Brown taught in Boston, Massachusetts; at the Pennsylvania College for Women; and at Kamehameha College, Honolulu for two years.

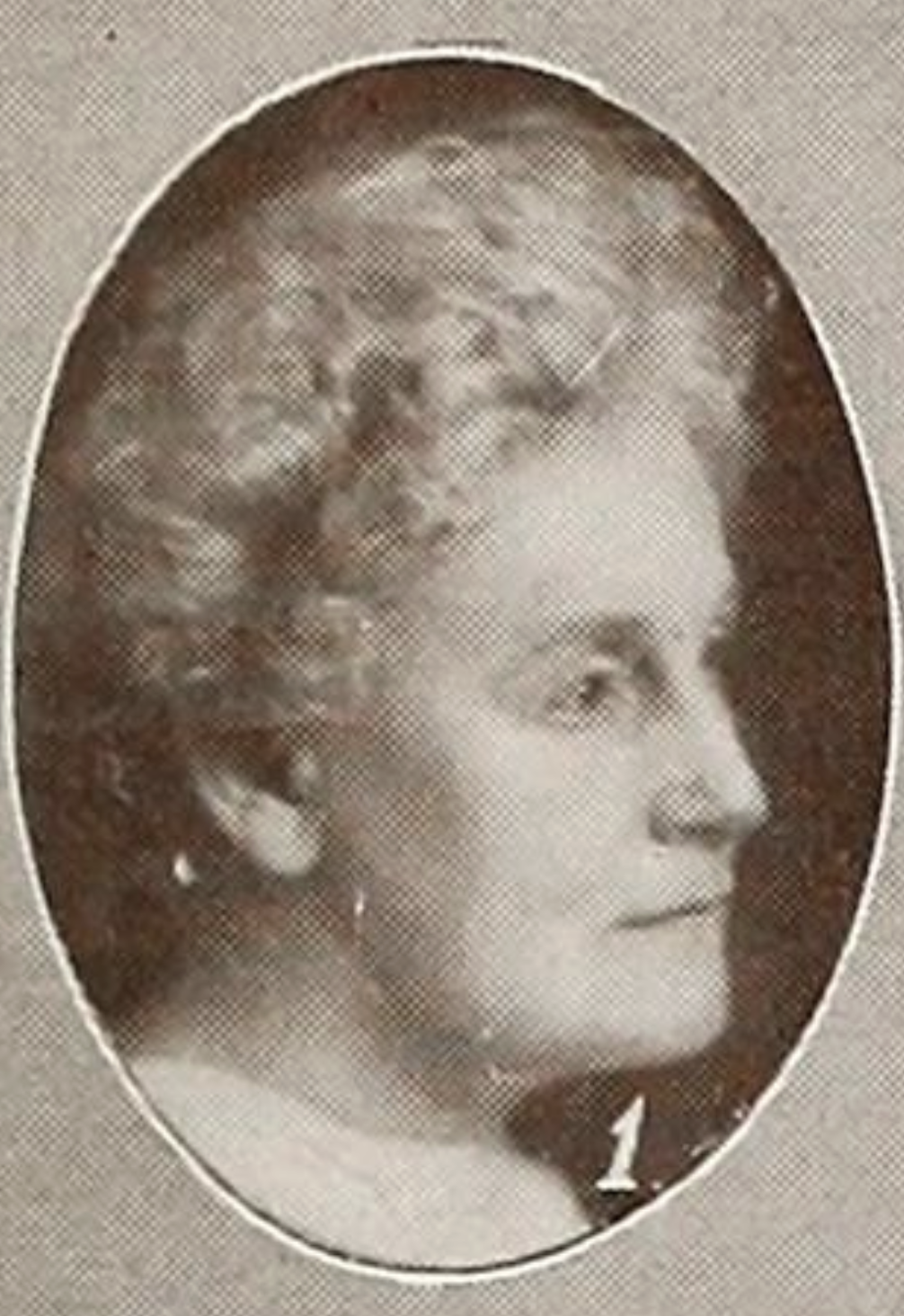
Rittenhouse Brown in 1914

She came to Los Angeles, California in 1905, serving as professor of English at Occidental College.

In 1907, she became the director of the school of English at the YWCA with classes in correct English, composition and rhetoric, word studies, American literature, English literature, Shakespeare, Greek and Roman mythology, American history, civil government, geography, reading, spelling, and arithmetic. The courses were developed with the belief that many foreign women coming to Los Angeles in the hope of securing employment would be eager to learn the rudiments of the English language.

The Rittenhouse Brown School of English, Music, and Travel, a private school with branches at Blanchard Hall, and at Mrs. Brown's home, opened in 1909. The following year, she organized the English Study Club, and served as its president for at least nine years. She also served as president of the Los Angeles American College Club in 1923, whose purpose was to pursue systematic study along lines of self-development and of literary appreciation. In later years, Rittenhouse Brown created a music appreciation studio in Hollywood.

She was associated with Florencio Constantino who established the California Temple of Arts in Los Angeles. There, she was head of the piano department, and held classes in English and literature.

Rittenhouse Brown was author of standard works on English usage, such as the English Grammar Blue Book (1912).

== Personal life ==
In Boston, in 1897, she married Prof. Dwight Rittenhouse. A faculty member of Harvard University, he was an archeologist with diplomatic relations, having been American consul at Athens, Greece. They traveled extensively throughout Europe, living in Athens for some time.

In 1915, action was taken by the United States District Attorney against Rittenhouse Brown for the recovery of money advanced by it when tourists were caught in Europe at the outbreak of World War I. It was alleged that she was furnished US$525 to return home from Venice, Italy, and did not repay that amount. Brown asserted that she paid the money on demand of an alleged treasury department agent named James Young. The treasury department stated that it did not know Young.

Sara Rittenhouse Brown died in Santa Monica, California, on April 20, 1938.

== Selected works ==
- English Grammar Blue Book, 1912
