= Berthe Marti =

American historian

Berthe M. Marti
- Born: May 11, 1904; Vevey, Switzerland
- Died: June 4, 1995 (aged 91)
- Education: Bryn Mawr College (Ph.D., 1934)
- Occupations: professor, Latin scholar, Medievalist
- Known for: Latin language; Medieval Latin language

Berthe Marie Marti (May 11, 1904, in Vevey, Switzerland – June 4, 1995, in Chapel Hill, North Carolina, US) was a Swiss-American scholar and teacher of classical and medieval Latin.

== Education and degrees ==
- Baccalauréat, Gymnase classique Cantonal, Lausanne, 1922
- Licenciée-ès-lettres (in Latin and English literature), University of Lausanne, 1925
- MA in Latin, Bryn Mawr College, 1926
- PhD in Latin, Bryn Mawr College, 1934. Dissertation: "The Adoration of the Roman Emperor from Augustus to Charlemagne," under the direction of Lily Ross Taylor.

== Career ==
Marti taught classical and medieval Latin at Bryn Mawr College, as instructor in Latin and French (1930–1934), assistant professor of Latin (1935–1943), associate professor (1943–1951), and professor (1951–1963). She moved to Chapel Hill, North Carolina, in 1963, and taught at the University of North Carolina at Chapel Hill as professor of classical and medieval Latin from 1963 until her retirement in 1976. For most of this period, she spent each fall in Rome, working on various research projects in the libraries of the American Academy in Rome and the Vatican, and then taught at Chapel Hill in the spring of the year.

== Awards ==
Among her numerous awards and distinctions: Rome Prize to the American Academy in Rome, 1944–1945; Fulbright Research Grant in Italy, 1946; Guggenheim Fellowship, 1954–1955; Martin Lectures ("Imitation and Originality in the Latin Epic of the Silver Age"), Oberlin College, 1972–73; elected Fellow of the Medieval Academy of America, 1977.

== Scholarship ==
Marti published two books, an edition of Arnulph of Orleans: Glosule super Lucanum (Rome 1958), and The Spanish College at Bologna in the Fourteenth Century (Philadelphia 1966), as well as numerous articles and reviews. Among her principal articles are "Arnulf and the Faits des Romans," Modern Language Quarterly 2 (1941) 3-23; "The Meaning of the Pharsalia," American Journal of Philology 66 (1945) 352–376; "Seneca's Tragedies: a New Interpretation," Transactions of the American Philological Association 76 (1945) 216–45; "Vacca in Lucanum," Speculum 25 (1950) 198–214; "Lucan's Invocation to Nero in the Light of the Medieval Commentaries," Quadrivium 1 (1956) 1–11; "1372: The Spanish College versus the Executors of Cardinal Albornoz's Testament," Studia Albornotiana 12 (1972) (= El Cardinal Albornoz y el Colegio de España) 93–129.

Among her undergraduate and graduate students, Marti was known as a demanding and engaged teacher. She expected students to read carefully and widely—for example, once asking a graduate class in Livy to read all surviving fragments of the Roman annalists outside of class. She emphasized close attention to vocabulary, syntax, literary form, and historical context in the texts students studied. Marti also spent considerable time advising and supporting her students and introduced many of them to the city of Rome and to scholars, both Italian and American, associated with the American Academy in Rome.

Known to everyone as "Miss Marti," but to some behind her back as "Berthe Noir," "Dragon Lady," "The Martinet," and other sobriquets, Marti enjoyed socializing with students and seemed to relish her reputation. She kept a 1920-vintage copy of Fowler's Modern English Usage open on a book stand in her office to settle any questions of proper language on the spot, although she denied being a purist, protesting that "one shouldn't pretend to speak 'better' English than one's neighbors, only English as good as theirs." (She could put inverted commas on a word simply by enunciating it.) After ridiculing one young man from the South for pronouncing "ten cents" like "tin cints", she suggested he carry a dictionary in his back pocket at all times and never be guilty again of spelling any word as it sounds.

In her eighties she was mugged on the streets of Paris. The thief tried to snatch her purse, which contained nothing of value. It was reported she bit off his thumb.

She delighted in teaching Beginning Latin classes, which she called "Baby Latin", and made the students translate, parse, conjugate and decline out loud in turns around the room. If a student could not rattle off whether a word was dative or ablative, or what length the vowel was in scansion, she might say, impatiently, "Life is full of decisions!" She had a range of oaths, "Hell's bells!" being one of the milder ones. When she was introduced at a symposium at Chapel Hill, she said, "The rumors of my retirement are greatly exaggerated," paraphrasing Mark Twain. At a post-constructionist lecture she attended, she reported, "I understood every word but not a single sentence." She did not shy away from explaining racy portions of Juvenal, Martial or Ovid. "Don't complain" she translated loosely in one instance, with a broad wink to the young men in the class, "about your girl having another sweetheart on the side; she might teach you a trick or two." When she died, her wish was to have "a splendid meal" prepared and spread before her on her deathbed (a scenario from Seneca). She was happy to write letters of reference for teaching jobs, travel and grants. They were handwritten and invariably closed with the words, "I can recommend Mr. ---- or Miss ------ without any qualification whatever." She maintained that "whatsoever" was a solecism.

Through a bequest, Marti established the Berthe M. Marti Fellowship at the American Academy in Rome to enable graduate students from Bryn Mawr College and the University of North Carolina at Chapel Hill to study and carry out research in Rome in the fields of early, classical, and medieval Latin, Latin palaeography, Latin textual criticism, or some combination thereof. The Fellowship, now established as an Affiliated Fellowship of the American Academy in Rome, was first held by Eric Hutchinson of Bryn Mawr College in 2005–2006, followed by John Henkel of the University of North Carolina at Chapel Hill (2007–2008) and Jessica M. Sisk of Bryn Mawr College (2010–2011).

== Bibliography ==
- an edition of Arnulfus, Glosule super Lucanum (1958).
- The Spanish College at Bologna (1963).
- editor of Lucain in Fondation Hardt Entretiens (1970).

== Necrology ==
“Memoirs of Fellows and Corresponding Fellows of the Medieval Academy of America.” Speculum, vol. 71, no. 3, 1996, pp. 798–808. JSTOR, JSTOR, www.jstor.org/stable/2865858.
