= Paul Rehak =

American archaeologist (1954–2004)

- Born: March 8, 1954; Ann Arbor, Michigan, US
- Died: June 5, 2004 (aged 50)

Academic background
- Education: University of Michigan; Bryn Mawr College
- Doctoral advisor: Brunilde Ridgway

Academic work
- Discipline: archeology
- Institutions: University of Kansas; Duke University; Loyola University of Chicago; American University of Paris; College of Wooster

Paul Rehak (March 8, 1954 – June 5, 2004) was an American archaeologist. Rehak's research interests extended from prehistoric and Classical Greece to Imperial Rome.

Rehak was born in Ann Arbor, Michigan, where he also attended the University of Michigan. In 1976 he received his B.A. cum laude in Classics and Archaeology. In 1980 he obtained his M.A. from Bryn Mawr College, writing on Mycenaean shrines under Machteld Mellink, and Ph.D. in 1985, writing on Roman sculpture under Brunilde Ridgway.

He went on teaching at College of Wooster, American University of Paris, Loyola University of Chicago and Duke University. At Duke he was also popular as an out activist for gay and lesbian rights. In March 2004, just months before his death, the University of Kansas promoted him to associate professor.

Rehak died in June 2004 of complications from a heart attack aggravated by a long struggle living with AIDS.

== Necrology ==
- John G. Younger. "Paul Rehak, 1954-2004." American Journal of Archaeology Vol. 108, No. 3 (Jul., 2004), pp. 447-448.

== Publications ==
- Paul Rehak, "Aeneas or Numa? Rethinking the Meaning of the Ara Pacis Augustae." The Art Bulletin 83.2 (Jun., 2001), pp. 190–208.
- Imperium and Cosmos: Augustus and the Northern Campus Martius was published by the University of Wisconsin Press in 2006. The book was edited by John G. Younger from a work in progress at the time of Rehak's death. Reviews: [Bryn Mawr Classical Review 2007.08.21 http://bmcr.brynmawr.edu/2007/2007-08-21.html]
