= Marcia Storch =

Marcia L. Storch (1933 – 1998) was the first self-declared feminist physician.

== Early life ==
She was born in Pittsburgh, Pennsylvania, in 1933. In 1971 Storch graduated from Bryn Mawr College and Medical College of Pennsylvania. Soon after graduating she moved to New York, where she went on to practice medicine. Storch insisted her patients partake in more decisions when it came to their health.

== Career ==
She became the director of the Adolescent Gynecology and Family planning clinic at St. Luke's–Roosevelt Hospital Center. She was a strong advocate to women being able to choose the type of birth control they wanted or pain medication to use during child birth. At the clinic, she provided treatment and information on sexually transmitted diseases to tens of thousands of disadvantaged teens. In 1987 Storch went into practice with Dr. Shelley Kolton in lower 5th avenue, New York, later relocating to SoHo, an underdeveloped neighborhood. By 1989 Storch decided to retire from her practice and pursue to spread the word about women's health practices. Storch became the head of Ob/Gyn news for the Medical News Network. As a television and radio producer she created programming geared towards family physicians and the Lifetime medical network. Phyllis Chesler, a co-founder of the Women's Health Network and author of Women and Madness, called Storch "both a pioneer and role model in feminist medicine".

== Storch Scholarship ==
Before her death from ovarian cancer, Storch wished to establish a scholarship fund through the Center for Reproductive Science. She wanted to encourage undergraduate women to study the basic physiology and biochemistry of the ovary. According to Northwest, with contributions received, the CRS established a scholarship fund in her name.

== Written works ==
- How to relieve cramps and other menstrual problems
- Painless Periods
- Women's health products handbook: smartbuys for healthy bodies – Marcia L. Storch, Ann Ann Rinzler 1996
- Cramps- coping with menstruation and premenstrual tension including a full exercise program
