= Asoka Bandarage =

Sri Lankan American academic and sociologist

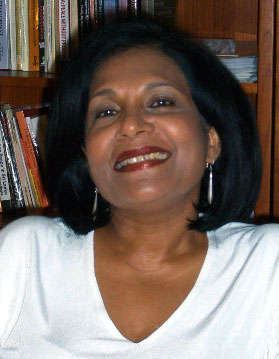
Asoka Bandarage

Asoka Bandarage is a Sri Lankan academic specializing in international development, political economy, women and gender studies, multiculturalism, conflict analysis and resolution, peace and security, South Asia, Sri Lanka, population and ecology. She has headed the Women's Studies Program at Mount Holyoke College and also taught at institutions including Georgetown University’s Public Policy Institute in Washington, DC. She is also a yoga instructor.

== Education and academic career ==
Bandarage has bachelor's degrees from the University of Sri Lanka and Bryn Mawr College. In 1975, she received a master's degree in religion from Yale University, and in 1980, she received her Ph.D. in sociology from Yale University.

Asoka Bandarage began her teaching career at Brandeis University, where she taught from 1979 to 1985. In fall 1988, she taught Sociology and International Relations as the Hubert H. Humphrey Professor at Macalester College. From 1989 to 2006, she taught at Mount Holyoke College, where she received tenure and chaired the Women's Studies Program from 1995 to 1997. From 2005 to 2012, she taught at Georgetown University, in the Edmund A. Walsh School of Foreign Service, the Government Department, and the Public Policy Institute, and from 2010 to 2013 she also taught at American University. She has since been a Distinguished Adjunct Professor at the California Institute of Integral Studies and a visiting lecturer at Colorado College.

== Boards ==
Bandarage has served on the boards of Critical Asian Studies, The National Advisory Council on South Asian Affairs, and Interfaith Moral Action on Climate.

== Publications ==
Bandarage is the author of several publications, including articles, books, and encyclopedia entries on South Asia, global political-economy, ethnicity, gender, population, ecology and other related topics. She also blogs at the Huffington Post and has led forums and addressed the United Nations General Assembly.

=== Books ===
- Colonialism in Sri Lanka: The Political Economy of the Kandyan Highlands, 1833-1886. Berlin: Mouton, 1983.
- Women, Population and Global Crisis: A Political-Economic Analysis. London: Zed Books, 1997.
- The Separatist Conflict in Sri Lanka: Terrorism, Ethnicity, Political Economy. London: Routledge, 2009 (South Asia paperback: Colombo: Vijitha Yapa, 2009).
- Sustainability and Well-Being: The Middle Path to Environment, Society and the Economy. Palgrave Pivot, 2014.

=== Documentaries ===
- Eppawala: An Urgent Appeal from Sri Lanka

=== Encyclopedia entries ===
- "Sri Lanka", Governments of the World, Macmillan Reference USA, 2005.
- "Family Planning", New Dictionary of the History of Ideas, Charles Scribner's Sons, 2005.
- "Multinationals", Routledge International Encyclopedia of Women's Studies, Routledge, 2001.
