= Transactions of the American Philological Association =

- Discipline: Classics, philology
- Language: English
- Edited by: Irene Peirano Garrison and Josh Billings

Publication details
- History: 1869–present
- Publisher: Johns Hopkins University Press (United States)
- Frequency: Biannually

Standard abbreviations
- ISO 4: Trans. Am. Philol. Assoc.

Indexing
- ISSN: 0360-5949 (print); 1533-0699 (web)
- OCLC no.: 3131421

Links
- Journal homepage; Online access at Project MUSE

Transactions of the American Philological Association (TAPA) is a peer-reviewed academic journal established in 1869 and the official publication of the Society for Classical Studies. It covers the history, culture, and language of ancient Greek and Roman societies. The journal is published biannually by the Johns Hopkins University Press.
