= Brandeis University Graduate School of Arts and Sciences =

Coordinates: 42°22′8.3″N 71°15′21.2″W

Brandeis Graduate School of Arts and Sciences
- Type: Private
- Established: 1953
- Dean: Eric Chasalow
- Academic staff: 390
- Location: Waltham, Massachusetts, USA
- Website: http://www.brandeis.edu/gsas/

The Graduate School of Arts and Sciences (GSAS) at Brandeis University in Waltham, Massachusetts, United States was established in 1953 on a 235-acre suburban campus, located 9 miles outside of Boston, and is one of four graduate schools on campus.

Brandeis University, founded in 1948, is named for the late U.S. Supreme Court Justice Louis Dembitz Brandeis. Soon after its founding, Brandeis University established an international reputation through prominent early faculty members such as Eleanor Roosevelt and composer Leonard Bernstein, and through election to the Association of American Universities.

In the Graduate School of Arts and Sciences' first year (1953), 42 students were enrolled in four areas of study: chemistry, Near Eastern and Judaic Studies, music composition, and psychology. As of 2009, Brandeis University's Graduate School of Arts and Sciences enrolls more than 900 students pursuing advanced degrees in more than 40 master's and certificate degrees and 17 doctoral programs.

== Master's and Post-Baccalaureate Programs ==
On average, master's students attend four semesters, but many programs may be completed in one year. Support to students, both inside and outside the classroom, is available through the following: merit and need based scholarships; a one-year master's colloquium to develop basic graduate skills; master's research funding to sponsor research for master's theses; travel funds to attend scholarly conferences; and career services for professional development. Professional and predoctoral programs are also offered to enhance one's skills in the social sciences, humanities, arts, education, natural sciences, and physical sciences. The emphases on small classes and faculty mentorship allow students to work closely with senior scholars.

Postbaccalaureate programs are also offered.

== Doctoral programs ==
The doctoral degree is often a requirement for most academic positions in higher education, but it also enhances one's qualifications for nonacademic careers in public and private organizations—from service in the federal government to the private sector. Brandeis University's doctoral programs emphasize research, writing, and public speaking—skills that are critical for every career path.

Most doctoral students are funded fully for five years.

== Boston Consortium ==
Brandeis University, Boston College, Boston University and Tufts University participate in a cross-registration consortium. A full-time graduate student in the Graduate School of Arts and Sciences may enroll in one graduate cross-registered course each term.

== Facilities ==
=== Carl J. Shapiro Science Center ===
The Carl J. Shapiro Science Center complex, which opened in January 2009, is a five-story teaching and research-laboratory building which contains modern teaching and research spaces for biochemistry, biology, chemistry, and genomics. The Shapiro Science Center houses the National Center of Behavioral Genomics, which is dedicated to understanding brain function and behavior. Current research focuses on degenerative neurological diseases, autism, learning, and memory.

Within the complex itself, key goals are to create research and teaching-lab/classroom spaces appropriate for the research and teaching that characterize science at Brandeis University and to foster connections between disciplines in the sciences through physical connections and the creation of interaction spaces.

The construction of the 175,000-square-foot (16,300 m^{2}), $154 million science complex, which was made possible by a generous donation from the family of Carl and Ruth Shapiro, houses two floors of biology and chemistry teaching labs and classrooms, three floors devoted to research labs, and an atrium and café.

=== Mandel Center for Humanities ===
Made possible by a $22.5 million gift from the Cleveland-based Mandel Foundation, the Mandel Center for Humanities bolsters Brandeis University’s commitment to the humanities and social sciences, and underscores the cultural and intellectual importance of the liberal arts education and the fields of literature, language, and philosophy.

Opened in fall 2010, the Mandel Center's mission is to foster original, interdisciplinary courses and offer increased opportunities for students to participate in research that incorporates multifaceted subject matter. The center also organizes special local, national, and international conferences and events.

=== Other Research Facilities ===
Brandeis faculty have also secured external funding for an array of other research facilities. These include:

- An 800 MHz nuclear magnetic resonance spectrometer
- An electron microscopy (EM) facility, including a 300kV field emission cryo EM
- A Fourier transform mass spectrometry facility, equipped for both electrospray and MALDI ionization
- X-ray crystallography facilities
- Microfluidics fabrication facility
- The Ashton Graybiel Spatial Orientation Laboratory
- The Mandel Center for the Humanities
- The Irving Schneider and Family Building
- CLEM-Facility for Correlative Light and Electron Microscopy

== Distinguished Faculty and Alumni ==
=== Faculty ===
Pulitzer Prize Winners:

David Hackett Fischer-History

Eileen McNamara-American Studies/Journalism

Yehudi Wyner-Music (emeritus)

National Academy of Sciences members:

Carolyn Cohen-Biology

David DeRosier-Biology (emeritus)

Stanley Deser-Physics (emeritus)

Jeffrey C. Hall-Biology/Neuroscience (emeritus)

Hugh Huxley-Biology (emeritus)

Eve Marder-Biology/Neuroscience

Chris Miller-Biochemistry/Neuroscience

Greg Petsko-Biochemistry/Chemistry (Institute of Medicine)

Alfred Redfield-Physics (emeritus)

Michael Rosbash-Biology/Neuroscience

American Academy of Arts and Sciences:

Edgar Brown-Mathematics (emeritus)

David Buchsbaum-Mathematics (emeritus)

Carolyn Cohen-Biology

Saul Cohen-Chemistry (emeritus)

David DeRosier-Biology (emeritus)

Stanley Deser-Physics (emeritus)

David Hackett Fischer-History

James Haber-Biology

Jeff Hall-Biology/Neuroscience (emeritus)

Ray Jackendoff-Language and Linguistics/Psychology (emeritus)

Gish Jen-English and American Literature

Mickey Keller-History

Henry Linschitz-Chemistry

Eve Marder-Biology/Neuroscience

Irene Pepperberg-Psychology

Greg Petsko-Biochemistry/Chemistry

Alfred Redfield-Physics (emeritus)

Jehuda Reinharz-Near Eastern Judaic Studies

Michael Rosbash-Biology/Neuroscience

Jonathan Sarna-Cultural Production/Near Eastern Judaic Studies

Sam Schweber-Physics (emeritus)

Andrew Szent-Györgyi-Biology (emeritus)

Howard Hughes Medical Investigators:

Nikolaus Grigorieff-Biochemistry, former faculty (1999-2013)

Dorothee Kern-Biochemistry/Biological Physics

Chris Miller-Biochemistry/Neuroscience

Michael Rosbash-Biology/Neuroscience

MacArthur Fellows:

Bernadette Brooten-Medieval and Renaissance Studies/Near Eastern and Judaic Studies/Women and Gender Studies

Gina G. Turrigiano-Biology/Neuroscience

See More

=== Alumni ===
Jason Carmichael (Genetic Counseling, M.S. '08) Accepted to Schweitzer Fellows Program

Ha Jin (PhD '93) Poet and fiction writer whose work includes Waiting (winner of the National Book Award) and, most recently, A Free Life.

Paul Anastas (PhD '90) Nominated by President Obama to the post of Assistant Administrator of the Environmental Protection Agency's Research and Development Office.

Theresa Rebeck (M.A.'83, MFA '86, PhD '89) Playwright, made her Broadway debut in October with "Mauritius."

Raymond Arsenault (History, PhD '81) Professor and writer, best known for his book, Freedom Riders.
