= Roselyn J. Eisenberg =

- Education: Bryn Mawr College (BA) University of Pennsylvania (Ph.D)
- Known for: Research of herpes simplex virus and poxvirus and how they enter susceptible cells
- Awards: American Academy of Microbiologists American Association for the Advancement of Science Member of Editorial Board for Journal of Virology
- Scientific career
- Fields: Microbiology, virology
- Workplaces: University of Pennsylvania

Roselyn J. Eisenberg is a professor at The University of Pennsylvania and a member of the University's School of Veterinary Medicine and School of Dental Medicine. The majority of Eisenberg's research is focused on the herpes simplex virus and the poxvirus and how they enter into susceptible cells. She also studies glycoproteins, vaccines, virology and microbiology.

== Education ==
Eisenberg graduated from Bryn Mawr College in 1960 with her applied baccalaureate degree in biology. She went on to obtain her PhD in microbiology at the University of Pennsylvania, where she now works. Dr. Eisenberg did her post-doctoral fellowship at Princeton University from 1965 to 1968. She works closely beside Dr. Gary H. Cohen, who is a professor and the chair of the Department of Microbiology at Penn Dental Medicine.

== Research contributions ==
Eisenberg studies how molecular events mediate a virus' entry into a cell. Her research is focused mainly on the herpes simplex virus (herpesviridea) and the poxvirus.

=== Herpesvirus ===
She is primarily interested in studying herpesviridae, which consists of enveloped DNA viruses that recruit orthologs, or genes that retain the same function, of three glycoproteins. These glycoproteins gB, gH, and gL play important roles in how a virus enters a cell and how it spreads when inside of a cell. Eisenberg is interested in the fact that glycoproteins gH, gL and gB are very protected in all herpesviruses, especially in the large number of animal herpesviruses, which can cause disease in small, farm, and zoo animals.

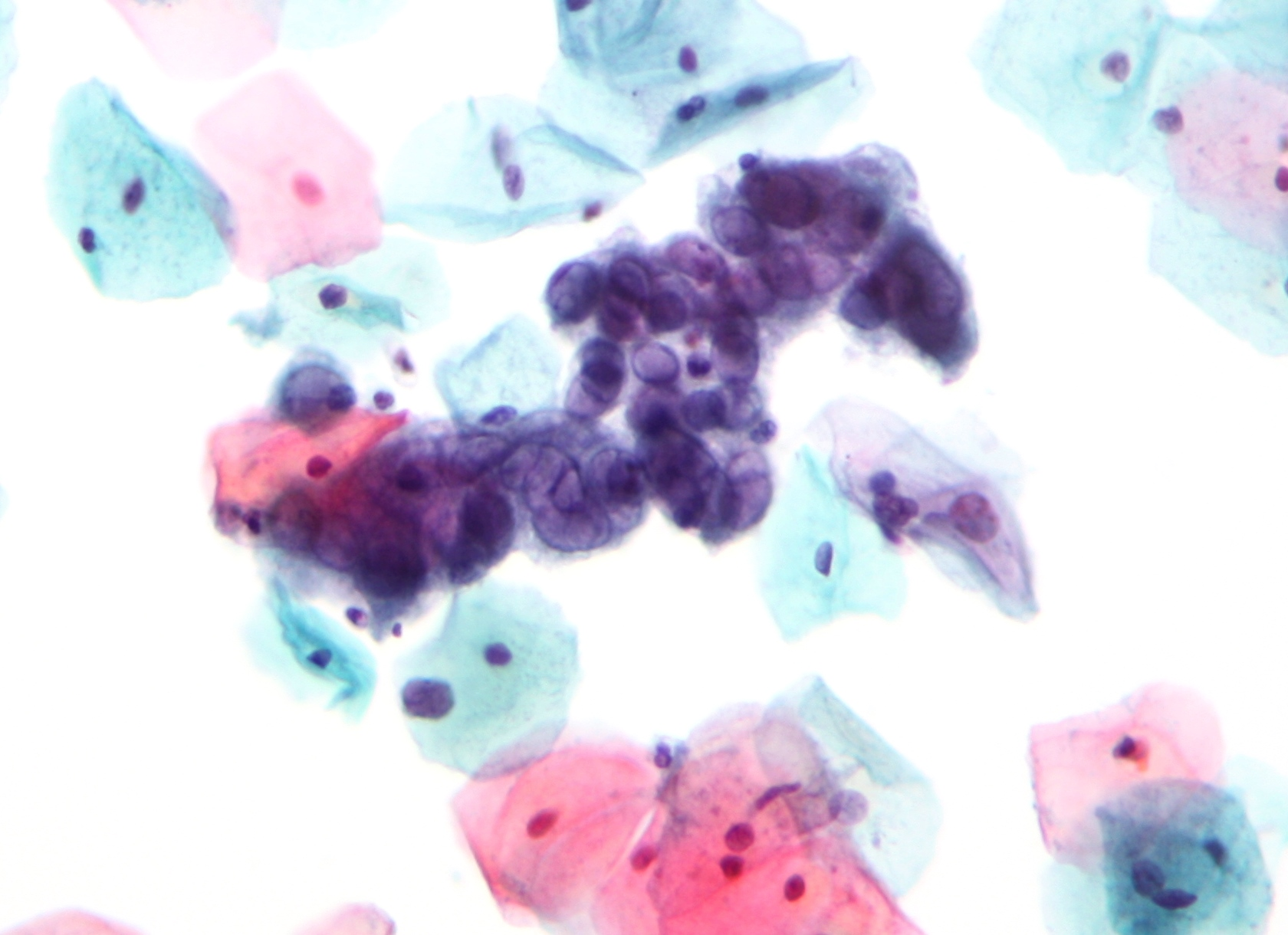
Herpes simplex virus pap test 2

=== Poxvirus ===
She is also very focused on studying the poxvirus variola, also known as smallpox, and the virus that is used as a vaccine against variola, called vaccinia. Her main goal is to understand how this virus enters a cell and also to come up with a subunit vaccine that will expand upon and improve the current vaccine for variola, which can have serious side effects and may not be used on pregnant women or individuals with an impaired immune system. She is directing her focus to the entry protein L1, which she believes is the receptor binding protein for vaccina and will be able to improve limitations of the current vaccine for smallpox.

== Publications ==
She has contributed research and information to 264 articles and has been cited 784 times. Below is a list of some of the publications she has taken part in.

- "Crystal Structure of Glycoprotein B from Herpes Simplex Virus 1"
- "A protein-based smallpox vaccine protects mice from vaccinia and ectromelia virus challenges when given as a prime and single boost"
- "Bimolecular complementation reveals that glycoproteins gB and gH/gL of herpes simplex virus interact with each other during cell fusion"
- "The Myristate Moiety and Amino Terminus of Vaccinia Virus L1 Constitute a Bipartite Functional Region Needed for Entry"
- "Antibody-Induced Conformational Changes in Herpes Simplex Virus Glycoprotein gD Reveal New Targets for Virus Neutralization"
- "Capturing the Herpes Simplex Virus Core Fusion Complex (gB-gH/gL) In An Acidic Environment"

== Honors ==
Eisenberg was elected to the American Academy of Microbiologists and the American Association for the Advancement of Science to honor her contributions and leadership. She is a member of the editorial board for the Journal of Virology.
