= Jane Calvin =

American photographer

- Born: 27 April 1938 (age 88); Chicago, Illinois
- Education: Bryn Mawr College; Art Institute of Chicago

Jane L. Calvin (born April 27, 1938) is a fine arts photographer and artist based in Chicago, Illinois.

Calvin was born in Chicago, Illinois. Her father was an avid art collector and Calvin was brought up in the art world from the time she was born. She attended classes at the Art Institute of Chicago as a young child and went on to pursue a degree in art history from Bryn Mawr College in 1959. Calvin worked as a private art dealer for some time before deciding to continue her education and become a fine art photographer. She graduated from the Art Institute of Chicago in 1982 with an M.F.A.

Calvin went on to be a professor of photography at the School of the Art Institute, Illinois Institute of Technology, and Beloit College. She was adjunct professor of photography at Columbia College in Chicago until 2005. Since she started making photographs, Calvin’s work has been exhibited across the U.S., as well as in Germany and China.

== Constructing artwork ==
Calvin constructs her photographs by montaging multiple slide projections and found objects into room-sized assemblages in her studio. She then photographs it, making a tableaux into which layers of meaning are woven. She does not use computer editing. Instead, Calvin utilizes a method known as straight photography. Calvin stated, "The images can be seen as my commentary on the political and social roles projected onto society whose desires, manipulated by language and image, conflict with concerns of gender, sexuality, race and female identity."

She says, "I make photographs, I don't take them. I am a maker of meaning, not an observer of it. My medium is photography, although it is includes the processes of sculpture and installation . I build room-sized sets onto which I project images and text, recording the final result with the camera. There are no darkroom or digital tricks. The process is straight photography."

For over 25 years, Calvin has been exploring society's approach to issues of gender, female identity, sexuality, vulnerability, love, and desire. Eschewing linearity, the work stands in opposition to the simplicity and minimalism prevalent in earlier 20th century image-making. Her images are elliptical, fragmented, and layered, reflecting the contemporary world as one of discontinuity and ambiguity with myriad connections—a world less temporally and spatially-fixed than ever before. Through the content carried in found materials and appropriated texts, she addresses the social and political conditions that are just out of sight, but remain similar to a background radiation exerting a subtle but undeniable influence on society.

Pop and pulp culture references throw a humorous light on cultural identity and gender roles projected onto society. The subject matter, appearing disconnected from its place and time, mysteriously overlaps one’s own collective awareness. She asks the viewer to see what has been ‘there all along’.

== Awards and grants ==
The focus of Jane Calvin's career has been as a fine art photographer. Her photographs are permanent collections in The Art Institute of Chicago, Minneapolis Institute of Arts, Detroit Institute of Art, The Polaroid International Collection (Germany), The Reader's Digest Collection (New York), The Addison Gallery of American Art (Andover, MA), The Tweed Museum of Art (MN), and The Ulrich Museum of Art (KS).

Her images are featured in books such as Love and Desire, by William Ewing, Director, Musee de l'Elysee, Lausanne SWITZERLAND, in Discontinuum, by Peter Spooner, Curator, The Tweed Museum of Art, in many issues of The Tampa Review, Tampa, FL, and as cover image of L' apprendistato di Duddy Kravitz, Adelphi Editions, MILAN.

International and national institutions which have featured her work include: The Museum Anna Nordlander, SWEDEN 2011; 798 Photo Gallery, BEIJING 2005; ArtSea Gallery, SHANGHAI 2005; Selby Gallery, Ringling School of Art & Design, Sarasota, FL, 2004 and 2007; Southeast Museum of Photography, Daytona Beach, FL 2004; Cress Gallery, University of Tennessee, Chattanooga 2004; Gallery 210, St. Louis, MO 2005; University of Rhode Island, Kingston, RI 2005; University of Arkansas, Fayetteville, AR, 2005; The Contemporary Arts Center of Virginia 2006, Purdue University 2007; Swedish National TV News, 2011; The Isetan Museum, Tokyo, JAPAN; The Photographic Center, Skopelos, GREECE; The Minneapolis Institute of Art, MN; ART CHICAGO, Int Art Exposition; Kim Foster Gallery NEW YORK; Robert Burge 20th Century Photographs, NEW YORK; The Tweed Museum of Art, Duluth, MN 2002; The Chicago Cultural Center: Ulrich Museum, Wichita, KS; The Detroit Institute of Art; Hartley/Scarfone Galleries, University of Tampa, FLA; The Delaware Center for Contemporary Art; Oklahoma State University; TAI Gallery, NEW YORK;.

She is a recipient of a National Endowment for the Arts Grant; Polaroid Materials Grants; numerous Illinois Arts Council Grants; and an Arts Midwest/ NEA Grant. The exhibition "Jane Calvin, A Decade of Work" at NIU Gallery in Chicago was awarded Best Photography Exhibition of 2002 by "New City, Chicago".

Her work has been widely published and reviewed in venues such as: The New York Times; The Chicago Tribune; Japan Art & Cultural Association Exhibition Catalogue, Tokyo; The Wilson Quarterly; Color Magazine, USA; Museums, Chicago; Love & Desire, Thames & Hudson, London; Body Icons, Skopelos, Greece; The Tampa Tribune, Florida; The Tampa Review Literary Magazine; The Toledo Blade, Ohio; Artweek, Los Angeles; Art News, New York; The Tampa Review; Expressions Magazine, Beijing; Homonumus Literary Magazine, Beijing; L'apprendistato di Duddy Kravitz, Mordecai Richler, Milan Italy.

She has appeared on CCTV International "Cultural Express", Beijing, CHINA 2005; SVT Swedish National TV News Stockholm SWEDEN 2011; and "848 Chicago Public Radio; WBEZ CHICAGO 2005.

She has been a Juror for The Pennsylvania Council on the Arts; a board member of WHITEWALLS, Journal of Language and Art; and a Guest Curator for the Rockford Art Museum, IL. She has been featured as Guest Lecturer and Visiting Artist at: The School of The Art Institute of Chicago, The University of Illinois, Society for Photographic Education, Bryn Mawr College Club of Chicago, University of Toledo, The Tweed Museum of Art, The Ulrich Museum of Art, Oklahoma State University, University of Tampa, National Conference of the Women's Caucus for Art, Rockford Art Museum, The Selby Gallery, Sarasota, FLA, The University of Arkansas, Fayetteville, AR & The Bryn Mawr College Chicago Alumnae Association, among others.

She has been a professor of photography at the School of the Art Institute, Illinois Institute of Technology, and Beloit College. She was adjunct professor of photography at Columbia College, Chicago from 1988 to 2008. .
