= Nancy J. Vickers =

Former president of Bryn Mawr College

Nancy J. Vickers is an American educator and college administrator. She was the seventh president of Bryn Mawr College in Bryn Mawr, Pennsylvania (1997–2008).

== Life ==
Vickers received her B.A. degree from Mount Holyoke College in 1967, and her Ph.D. degree from Yale University in 1976. She has taught at Dartmouth College and was Dean of Curriculum and Instruction in the College of Letters, Arts and Sciences, and Professor of French, Italian and Comparative Literature at the University of Southern California. USC honored Vickers with an Excellence in Teaching Award in 1994.

== Bryn Mawr President ==
Vickers was named president of Bryn Mawr in 1997. She began her tenure by presenting her Plan for a New Century. When she retired in June 2008, she left the college with a 40 percent increase in undergraduate applications, a completed fund-raising campaign that tripled the goal of the previous campaign, and an endowment that had nearly doubled during her eleven-year tenure.

During her tenure, she was referred to as 'Nancy J.' by the students.

Vickers was perceived as an innovative president, who preserved the college's traditions and challenged both students and alumnae by successfully developing campaigns to expand Bryn Mawr intellectually and financially.
