= Ragsdale (surname) =

Ragsdale is a surname. Notable people with the surname include:

- Blake Ragsdale Van Leer (1893–1956), president of Georgia Institute of Technology
- Corey Ragsdale (born 1982), American baseball coach
- Daniel Ragsdale, until 2017 - Deputy Director of the Immigration & Customs Enforcement (ICE)
- Danny Ragsdale (born 1977), American football player
- David Ragsdale, American rock violinist
- Eleanor Ragsdale (1926-1998), American educator, entrepreneur, and activist
- George Ragsdale (born 1951), American football player
- Graham Ragsdale, of the Canadian Forces was the commander of the Third Battalion Princess Patricia's Canadian Light Infantry
- Ray Stevens (born Harold Ray Ragsdale in 1939), American singer and songwriter
- Isaac Newton Ragsdale (1859–1937), mayor of Atlanta, Georgia
- J. Willard Ragsdale (1872–1919), American politician
- Katherine Hancock Ragsdale, American episcopal priest
- Lincoln Ragsdale (1926-1995), American civil rights leader
- Richard Ragsdale (died 2004), American physician
- Ronald Sargison AKC, Dean of St George's Cathedral, Georgetown, Guyana
- Virginia Ragsdale (1870–1945) American teacher and mathematician
- William Ragsdale (born 1961), American actor
- William P. Ragsdale (1837–1877), American lawyer and translator
- William Ragsdale Cannon (1916–1997), American United Methodist bishop

== See also ==
- Ragsdale (disambiguation)
