= Hjelmslev =

Hjelmslev may refer to:

== Persons ==
- Johannes Hjelmslev (1873–1950), mathematician
- Louis Hjelmslev (1899–1965), linguist

== Other ==
- Hjelmslev's theorem
- Hjelmslev transformation
