= Friends School of Baltimore =

Quaker school in Baltimore, Maryland, US

Location
- 5114 N. Charles Street, Baltimore, MD, 21210, United States; 39°21′22″N 76°37′39″W

Information
- Type: Private, Co-ed, Day
- Motto: Palma Non Sine Pulvere
- Religious affiliation: Quaker
- Established: 1784; 242 years ago
- Head of School: Christian Donovan
- Faculty: 95
- Enrollment: 1009 total
- Average class size: 19 students
- Student to teacher ratio: 10:1
- Campus: Suburban, 35 acres
- Colors: Scarlet and Gray
- Athletics: 30 sports
- Athletics conference: Men: MIAA, Women: IAAM
- Mascot: The Quaker
- Newspaper: The Quaker Quill
- Yearbook: The Quaker
- Website: friendsbalt.org
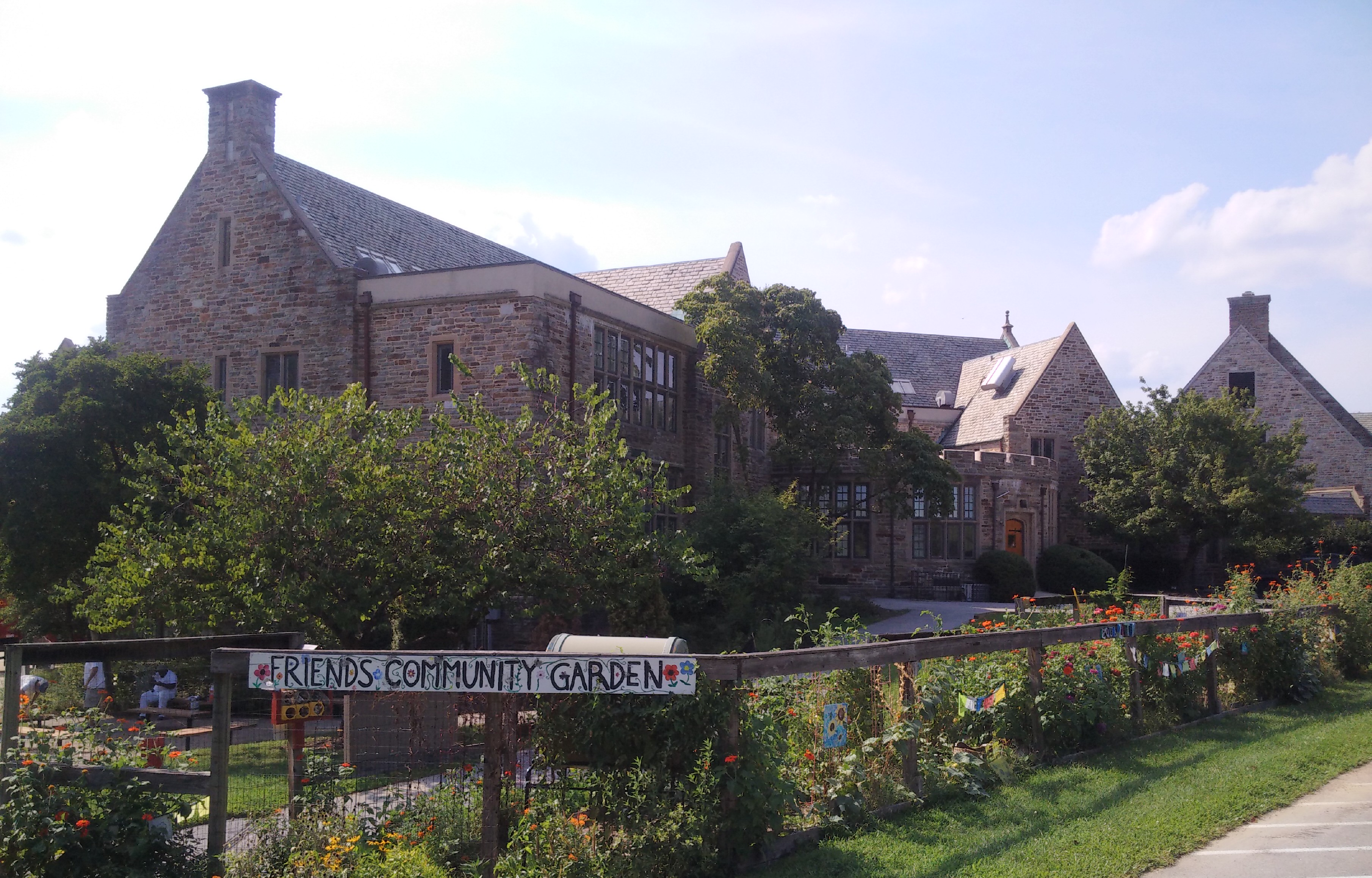
- Part of the Friends School campus

Friends School of Baltimore is a private Quaker school in Baltimore, serving students in pre-kindergarten through 12th grade.

== History ==
It is the oldest private school in Baltimore, founded in 1784 by members of the Religious Society of Friends. Classes were first held in the Aisquith Street Meetinghouse in the East Baltimore community of Old Town. The school was moved to the Lombard Street Meetinghouse in the 1840s and then, in 1899, to its third location at 1712 Park Avenue, adjacent to the Park Avenue Meetinghouse. In 1925, Friends purchased its present site at 5114 North Charles Street. Though the school was incorporated in 1973 and separated from the Baltimore Monthly Meeting of Friends, Stony Run, it maintains historic and philosophic ties with the Meeting.

== Curriculum and administration ==
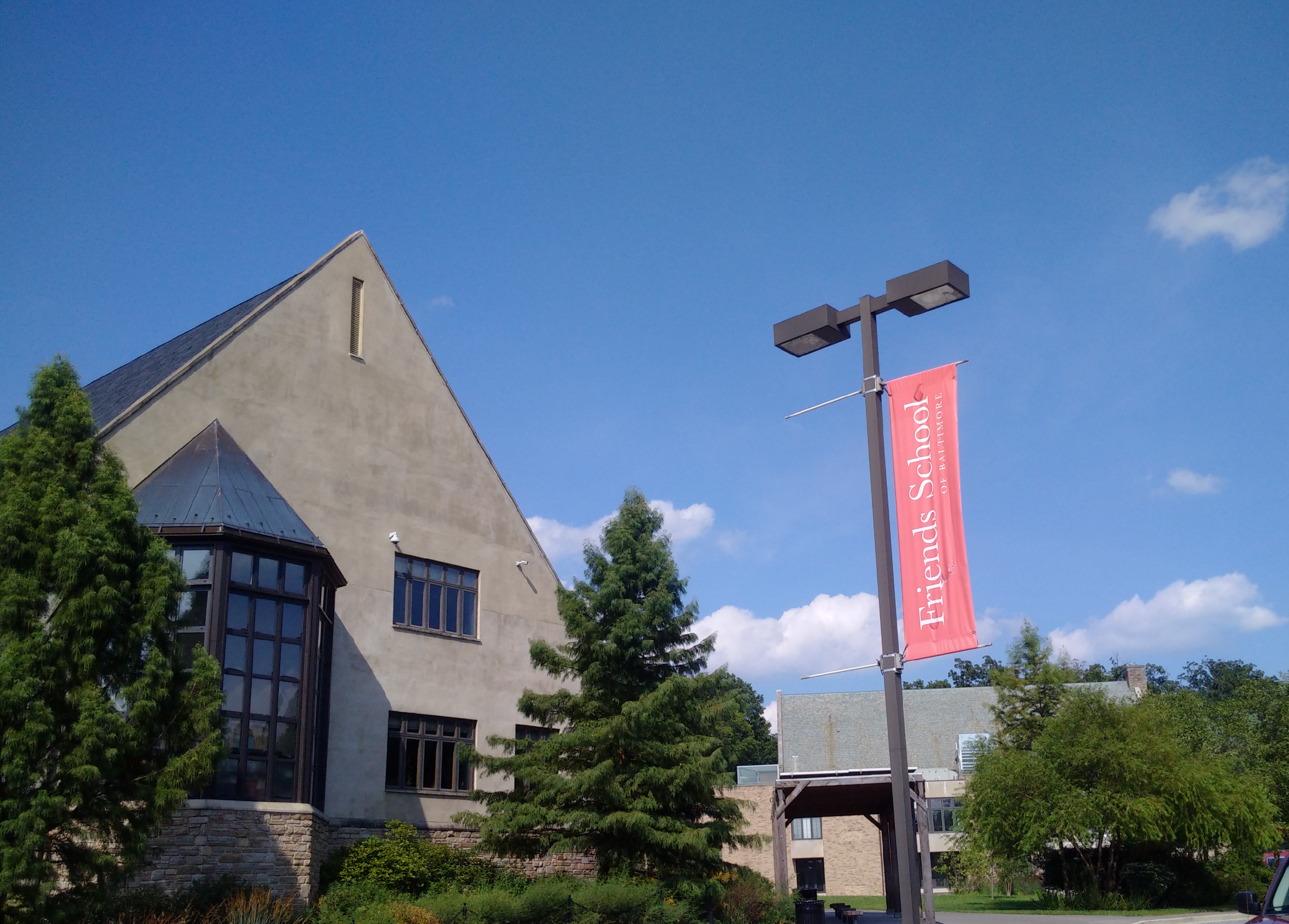
Friends School

As of 2006, the school had a faculty of 105 teachers, including 87 full-time faculty and a yearly operating budget of $16.1 million. As of 2022, the school has an endowment of $41.89 million. The school is governed by a board of trustees.

Friends' academics are notable for a number of signature programs: the University Partnership Program, Scholas Certificate Program, Inspired Institute, Social Justice Practitioners, William Penn Fellows, and Peer Educators. Friends School is accredited by the Middle States Association of Colleges and Schools and the Association of Independent Maryland Schools, and is approved by the Maryland State Board of Education.

== Principals, headmasters, heads of the school ==
- Eli Matthews Lamb (1864-1899†)
- Louisa Powell Blackburn (1889–1899)
- John William Gregg (1899–1903)
- Edward Clarkston Wilson (1903–1927)
- William Sibley Pike (1927–1935)
- Edwin Cornell Zavitz (1935–1943)
- Bliss Forbush Sr. (1943–1960)
- William Byron Forbush II (1960–1998)
- Jonathan Miller Harris (1998–2002)
- Lila Boyce Lohr (2002–2005)
- Matthew William Micciche (2005–2021)
- Dennis Bisgaard (Interim 2021-2022)
- Christian Donovan (2022–present)

†The terms "Principal" and "Headmaster" were not used before 1864. The term "Head of School" was first used by Jon M. Harris.

†From 1889 to 1899 Eli M. Lamb's "Friends' Elementary and High School" operated separately from the Baltimore Monthly Meeting's school.

== Historical timeline ==
- 1781 Quaker Meeting House opened at Aisquith and Fayette Streets.
- 1800 School House constructed on Old Town property.
- 1816 Girls' School opened.
- 1840s School moved to Lombard Street Meeting House.
- 1865 Introduction of high-school classes.
- 1866 Name changed to "Friends Elementary and High School," Baltimore's first private high school.
- 1887 Lombard Street property sold.
- 1892 Purchase of lot next to Park Avenue Meeting House.
- 1899 Renamed "Park Avenue Friends Elementary and High School."
- 1900 Name changed to "Friends School".
- 1901 First issue of Friends School Quarterly.
- 1908 Electric lighting was installed in the school.
- 1911 Purchase of 1712 Park Avenue for kindergarten and primary grades.
- 1912 Purchase of 8½ acres in West Forest Park for athletic field. First football team.
- 1913 Student government organization began.
- 1921 School uniforms adopted.
- 1924 Boys' lacrosse started.
- 1927 Girls' lacrosse started.
- 1929 Primary Department moved to the Homeland campus.
- 1931 Intermediate Department Building constructed at Homeland.
- 1936 High School moved to Homeland. School organization changed to a Lower School (grades 1-6) and an Upper School (grades 7-12).
- 1937 Clubhouse remodeled to house nursery and kindergarten classes. A new gymnasium was built.
- 1954 Education Committee changed admission policy to allow desegregation.
- 1955 First black students admitted to Friends.
- 1964 All classes desegregated.
- 1966 New science building and new addition to gymnasium.
- 1967 First full-time black faculty hired.
- 1970 Middle School established.
- 1974 Faculty Meeting for Business established.
- 1975 Auditorium extended to house Middle School.
- 1982 Addition to Upper School building. Purchase of 2.1 acres (8,500 m^{2}) from Cathedral property.
- 1986 New cafeteria built.
- 1987 Pool built for summer programs use.
- 1989 Expansion of Lower School to Pre-primary ages.
- 2003 Opening of the Alumni Center.
- 2005 New Middle School and Athletic Turf.
- 2009 New dining hall built
- 2015 Redid Auditorium
- 2016 Redid Athletic Turf
- 2024 Renovated Lower School
- 2026 New softball field in progress

== Athletics ==
Friends' athletic program for middle and upper school students is intended to impart Quaker values and foster "collaboration, resilience, teamwork, communication, and leadership", for its 15 middle school teams and 19 upper school teams for boys and girls. Sports offered include soccer, field hockey, cross country and track, basketball, volleyball, tennis, lacrosse, baseball, and softball. The Quakers boys soccer team won the conference championship in 2017. Declining student participation in tackle football, mirroring national trends, resulted in Friends dropping the sport in 2018.

== Notable alumni ==
- Ryan T. Anderson, political philosopher
- Teresa Cohen, mathematician
- Jae Deal, composer and Pop music producer (middle school attendee)
- Alfred Robert Louis Dohme, pharmacist, chemist, and founder of the Baltimore Museum of Art
- Holter Graham, actor (Fly Away Home), current member on the board of directors of the American Federation of Television and Radio Artists
- Kyle Harrison, professional lacrosse player
- Frederick Hecht, pediatrician and geneticist, named the Fragile X syndrome in 1970
- Kenneth Hecht, public interest attorney and advocate
- Alcaeus Hooper, mayor of Baltimore City from 1895 to 1897
- Frank Albert Kaufman, United States District Judge
- Davy Lauterbach, TV writer
- Andy MacPhail, former Baltimore Orioles COO (not a graduate but attended Friends)
- Jonathan Meath, American TV producer (up to fourth grade)
- Felix Morley, Rhodes Scholar, Pulitzer-Prize winning journalist, and president of Haverford College
- J. Smith Orrick (died 1930), Maryland state delegate
- Thomas Rowe Price Jr., American investment banker and founder of T. Rowe Price
- Justin B. Ries, American scientist and inventor known for discoveries in the field of global oceanic change
- Lance Reddick, TV and film actor
- Rachel Talalay, film director, producer, actress
- Jason Winer, actor, director ("Modern Family", etc.)

== See also ==
- List of Friends Schools, including colleges and preparatory schools associated with the Religious Society of Friends

== Sources ==
- Friends for two hundred years: A history of Baltimore's oldest school, by Dean R. Esslinger
