= Emilie Martin =

American mathematician

- Emilie Norton Martin
- Born: December 30, 1869; Elizabeth, New Jersey, US
- Died: February 8, 1936 (aged 66); South Hadley, Massachusetts, US
- Education: Bryn Mawr College
- Scientific career
- Fields: Mathematics
- Workplaces: Mount Holyoke College
- Thesis: Determination of the Non-Primitive Substitution Groups of Degree Fifteen and the Primitive Substitution Groups of Degree Eighteen (1901)
- Doctoral advisor: Charlotte Scott; James Harkness

Emilie Norton Martin (30 December 1869 – 8 February 1936) was an American mathematician and professor of mathematics at Mount Holyoke College.

== Life ==
Martin earned her bachelor's degree at Bryn Mawr College in 1894 majoring in mathematics and Latin. She continued her graduate studies at Bryn Mawr under the supervision of Charlotte Scott. In 1897-1898 she used a Mary E. Garrett Fellowship from Bryn Mawr to study at the University of Göttingen. In Göttingen, Martin and Virginia Ragsdale attended lectures by Felix Klein and David Hilbert. Although her name and dissertation title were printed in the 1899 commencement program, her Ph.D. wasn't granted until 1901 when her dissertation was published.

In 1903 she became an instructor at Mount Holyoke College. She was later promoted to associate professor and then professor. Although she had earned a doctorate, it did not hasten her promotion to professor. She spent eight years as an instructor and fifteen as an associate professor. This was common for women of her time, who were often unable to pass the associate professorship. Martin's research focused on primitive substitution groups of degree 15 and primitive substitution groups of degree 18. In 1904 she published the index to the first ten volumes of the Bulletin of the American Mathematical Society.

Martin was a member of the American Association for the Advancement of Science, the American Mathematical Society, and the Mathematical Association of America.
