= Ragsdale =

Ragsdale may refer to:

- Ragsdale (surname)
- Ragsdale High School, a public high school in Jamestown, North Carolina
- Ragsdale, Indiana, an unincorporated community in Knox County

== See also ==
- Ragsdale conjecture, a mathematical conjecture
