= Charlotte Scott =

British mathematician (1858–1931)

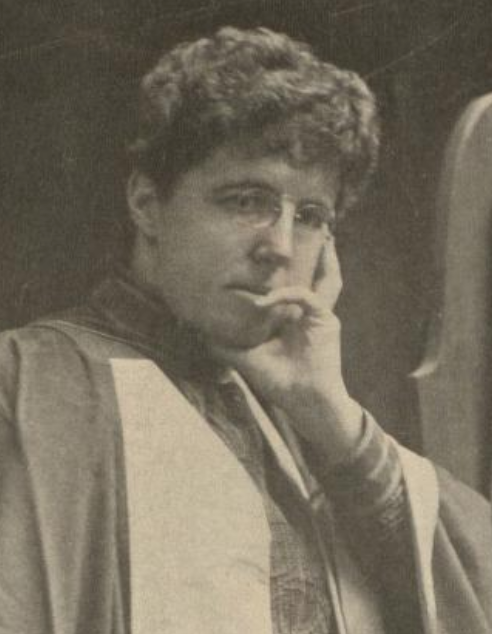
- Charlotte Angas Scott, from the 1910 yearbook of Bryn Mawr College
- Born: Charlotte Angas Scott; 8 June 1858; Lincoln, Lincolnshire, England
- Died: 10 November 1931 (aged 73); Cambridge, Cambridgeshire, England
- Scientific career
- Fields: Mathematics
- Institutions: Cambridge University; Bryn Mawr College
- Doctoral advisor: Arthur Cayley
- Doctoral students: Louise Cummings; Ada Maddison; Virginia Ragsdale; Emilie Martin; Mary Gertrude Haseman

Charlotte Angas Scott (8 June 1858 – 10 November 1931) was a British mathematician who made her career in the United States; she was influential in the development of American mathematics, including the mathematical education of women. Scott played an important role in Cambridge changing the rules for its famous Mathematical Tripos exam.

== Early life ==
She was the second of seven children to Caleb Scott, a minister of the Congregational Church, and Eliza Exley Scott. Educated at Girton College, Cambridge from 1876 to 1880 on a scholarship, she was then a Resident Lecturer in Mathematics there until 1884. In 1885 she became one of the first British women to receive a doctorate, and the first British woman to receive a doctorate in mathematics, which she received from the University of London. She did her graduate research under Arthur Cayley at Cambridge University, but since Cambridge did not begin issuing degrees to women until 1948, Scott received her BSc (1882) and D.Sc. (1885) from the University of London through external examinations.

== Passing the Tripos ==
In 1880, Scott obtained special permission to take the Cambridge Mathematical Tripos Exam, as women were not normally allowed to sit for the exam. She came eighth on the Tripos of all students taking them, but due to her sex, the title of "eighth wrangler," a high honour, went officially to a male student.

At the ceremony, however, after the seventh wrangler had been announced, all the students in the audience shouted her name.

The man read out the names and when he came to 'eighth,' before he could say the name, all the undergraduates called out 'Scott of Girton,' and cheered tremendously, shouting her name over and over again with tremendous cheers and waving of hats.

— contemporary report, "Charlotte Angas Scott (1858–1931)" in Women of Mathematics: A Biobibliographic Sourcebook

Because she could not attend the award ceremony, Scott celebrated her accomplishment at Girton College where there were cheers and clapping at dinner, a special evening ceremony where the students sang "See the Conquering Hero Comes", received an ode written by a staff member, and was crowned with laurels.

After this incident women were allowed to formally take the exam and their exam scores listed, although separately from the men's and thus not included in the rankings. Women obtaining the necessary score also received a special certificate instead of the BA degree with honours. In 1922, James Harkness remarked that Scott's achievement marked "the turning point in England from the theoretical feminism of Mill and others to the practical education and political advances of the present time".

== Work ==
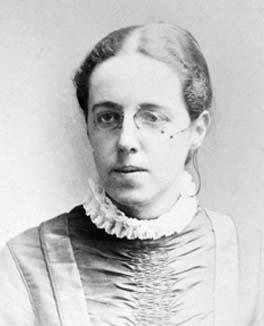
Charlotte Angas Scott

Moving to the United States in 1885, she became one of eight founding faculty and Associate Professor of Mathematics at Bryn Mawr College, and Professor from 1888 to 1917. She was the first mathematician at Bryn Mawr College and the first department head. During this period she directed the PhD theses of some pioneering women mathematicians. Of the nine other women to earn doctorates in mathematics in the nineteenth century, three studied with Scott.

Her mathematical speciality was the study of specific algebraic curves of degree higher than two. Her book An Introductory Account of Certain Modern Ideas and Methods in Plane Analytical Geometry was published in 1894 and reprinted thirty years later. Scott was one of the first English language textbook writers to be "perfectly aware" of the "distinction between a general principle and a particular example". She played an important role in the transition to twentieth century custom of abstract mathematical proofs.

In 1891, she became the first woman to join the New York Mathematical Society, later called the American Mathematical Society. She served as the first woman on the first Council of the American Mathematical Society in 1894, and received an acclaimed review from the Society in 1896. She is also credited with being the author of the first mathematical research paper written in the US that was widely recognised in Europe, "A Proof of Noether's Fundamental Theorem" (Mathematische Annalen, Vol. 52 (1899)). She was one of only four women to attend the inaugural International Congress of Mathematicians in Zurich in 1897; the other three were Iginia Massarini, Vera von Schiff, and Charlotte Wedell. In 1906 Scott served as vice-president of the American Mathematical Society.

== Women in mathematics ==
Scott maintained the view that personal conservatism was a requirement to promote women's educational and political equality. She disapproved of smoking and makeup, however she did bob her hair before moving to Bryn Mawr (short hair being controversial even in the 1920s). This view was also held by the early Girton College community, because unaccompanied women in Cambridge could be thrown into Spinning House, a special prison for prostitutes and suspected prostitutes.

She was a staunch supporter of rigour in women's classes, writing in a letter to Bryn Mawr President M. Carey Thomas:

I am most disturbed and disappointed at present to find you taking the position that intellectual pursuits must be "watered down" to make them suitable for women, and that a lower standard must be adopted at a woman's college than in a man's. I do not expect any of the other members of the faculty to feel this way about it; they, like (nearly) all men that I have known, doubtless take an attitude of toleration, half amused and half kindly, on the whole question; for even where men are willing to help in women's education, it is with an inward reserve of condescension.

— Charlotte Scott, Scott Papers

The word "nearly" is written in small lettering above the handwritten letter.

== Later life ==
Scott and Grace Andrews were the only two women listed in the first edition of American Men of Science, which appeared in 1906.

Also in 1906, Scott developed an acute case of rheumatoid arthritis, which along with her increasing deafness, interrupted her work. Under the advice of a doctor to get outside exercise, Scott began gardening and developed a new strain of chrysanthemum. She retired in 1924, but stayed an extra year in Bryn Mawr to help her eighth doctoral student complete her dissertation before she returned to and settled in Cambridge.

Scott died on 10 November 1931. She is buried at the Parish of the Ascension Burial Ground in Cambridge, in her cousin Eliza Nevin's grave.

Now walk to the door of the chapel and look at grave 4C52 which is a curb in the second row in the second row on your right. There is a scroll on this grave of ELIZA NEVIN to CHARLOTTE ANGUS SCOTT, who entered Girton College in 1876 and became a Wrangler in the Mathematical Tripos in 1880.

— L.J. Slater, A Walk Around The Ascension Parish Burial Ground

== Recognition ==
In 2016, the Council of the University of Cambridge approved the use of Scott's name to mark a physical feature within the North West Cambridge Development.

In 2018 The University of Lincoln opened the Charlotte Scott Algebra Centre, after founding the annual Charlotte Scott Lecture in Mathematics in 2017, and opening the Charlotte Scott Building on the University's Brayford Campus.

== Publications ==
- Scott, Charlotte A. (1894). An Introductory Account of Certain Modern Ideas and Methods in Plane Analytical Geometry. Macmillan.
