= Frank Vigor Morley =

American mathematician (1899–1980)

Frank Vigor Morley (4 January 1899 – 8 October 1980) was an American mathematician, author, editor and publishing executive. As had his two older brothers, Christopher and Felix, Morley attended Haverford College and then studied at the University of Oxford as a Rhodes Scholar. Morley worked in book publishing in London and New York and played a significant role in the early history of the publishing firm Faber and Faber, where he became a close friend of the poet T. S. Eliot.

== Life ==
Morley was born on 4 January 1899 in Haverford, Pennsylvania where his father Frank Morley was Professor of Mathematics at Haverford College. In 1900 his father was named chairman of the mathematics department at Johns Hopkins University and the family removed to Baltimore, Maryland. As had his two, older brothers, Christopher and Felix, Frank returned to Haverford College for his undergraduate education which, however, was interrupted in 1917 when Morley left school to serve as 2nd lieutenant in an Engineering unit based at Hog Island, Philadelphia, during World War I.

Morley received his bachelor's degree in 1918 from Johns Hopkins University. Morley won a Rhodes Scholarship, as did his two brothers, and attended New College, Oxford; they were the only family of three brothers to receive this prestigious scholarship. In 1921 he wrote on the Tschirnhausen cubic, a pursuit curve.

Morley earned a doctorate in mathematics from University of Oxford in 1923. Morley remained in England, working at The Times Literary Supplement, and then as London manager for the publishers of The Century Magazine. Geoffrey Faber hired Morley in 1929 to be co-director of the newly re-organized publishing firm Faber and Faber. In this capacity Morley worked with and became close friends with T. S. Eliot, then an editor at Faber and Faber. Morley assisted Eliot in quickly finding new accommodation when Eliot separated from his wife. Eliot wrote the poem "Cows" for Morley's children.

In 1933 Morley and his father Frank Morley published the "stimulating volume," Inversive Geometry. The book develops complex numbers as a tool for geometry and function theory.

In 1936 Morley's novel War Paint was published. Reviewing the book in The New English Weekly, George Orwell described it as "an exceedingly naïve adventure story, and at the same time a sort of Chelsea Hospital for superannuated jokes."

In 1939 Morley left London for New York to become Vice-President, and Director of the Trade Editorial Department at Harcourt, Brace, Jovanovich. Shortly thereafter Harcourt published My Sister and I by Dirk van der Heide (1941), the story of the German bombing of Rotterdam ostensibly written by an 11-year-old refugee to England and thence to the United States. My Sister and I enjoyed considerable commercial and critical success, but in the 1980s was discovered to have been a literary fabrication conducted by Harcourt, under Morley's supervision, to encourage American participation in World War II, possibly with guidance or encouragement from British intelligence services.

During the war, Morley also served on the National War Labor Board. Of his experiences he wrote, "A labor dispute is composed of three ingredients – heat, details, background – and so to cool it off there would be a public hearing... generally a hearing would be before a three man panel. In my experience of various positions with the Board the job of panel chairman, in the early days, was the most fun. Fun is possibly not the right word...in many cases that I handled I was scared stiff."

Following the war, Morley returned to England to become Director of the publisher Eyre & Spottiswoode from which he ultimately retired.

== Literary connections ==
Expanded chessboard with twelve extra squares to revitalize general play

As an editor and publisher, Morley enjoyed a wide correspondence and friendships with many prominent authors and literary figures of the day. These included Eliot, Ezra Pound, Lewis Mumford, and Walter De la Mare, as well as Morley's eldest brother Christopher, who was a notable author and powerful promoter of literature. It was Frank Morley who suggested to Pound in 1933 that he write an autobiography, which resulted in Pound's 1938 work Guide to Kulchur. Morley's literary correspondence is now held chiefly by the New York Public Library's Berg Collection.

With his brother Christopher, Morley had long been an admirer of the Sherlock Holmes stories by Sir Arthur Conan Doyle. Christopher originated The Baker Street Irregulars in 1934 as an informal meeting of his friends and others interested in Holmes, but in order to restrict membership to those who were truly knowledgeable if not expert in the stories, and eliminate mere casual readers of Conan Doyle, a membership test in the form of a crossword puzzle was devised by Frank V. Morley. This was published in Christopher's "Bowling Green" column in the May 1934 issue of the Saturday Review of Literature.

Morley took note of chess books distributed by his company and ventured to propose a chess variant: a chessboard increased by 12 squares, six along each rook file. He explained that chess theory, particularly the playable chess openings, had destroyed the novelty of play, which could be remedied by more room to move.

Morley traveled widely throughout England before and after the Second World War, incorporating his reading and observations into a number of non-fiction works of literary history and tourism, the last of which, Literary Britain, was published only days before his death on 8 October 1980 at age 82 in Buckinghamshire, England.

== Personal life ==
Morley married Christina McLeod Innes 14 May 1925. They had two sons and two daughters: Donald, Oliver, Peregrine, and Susannah.

== Works ==
- Travels in East Anglia Travels in East Anglia] (New York: Harcourt, [1923]) now available from HathiTrust
- Dora Wordsworth: Her Book (Boston: Houghton Mifflin, 1925)
- Whaling North and South with J.S. Hodgson (New York: Century, 1926)
- East South East (London: Longmans, 1929)
- Lamb before Elia (London: J. Cape, 1932)
- Inversive Geometry (with father Frank Morley), (New York: Ginn & Co., 1933) now available from HathiTrust
- War Paint, a Story of Adventure (London: Faber & Faber, 1936) published in the United States as The Wreck of the Active (Boston and New York, Houghton Mifflin Company, 1936)
- My One Contribution to Chess (New York: B.W. Huebsch, 1945) now available from HathiTrust
- Death in Dwelly Lane (London: Eyre & Spottiswoode, 1952)
- The Great North Road: A Journey in History (New York: Macmillan, 1961)
- “A Few Recollections of Eliot.” The Sewanee Review, vol. 74, no. 1, 1966, pp. 110–133. now available from JSTOR Accessed 18 Oct. 2020.
- The Long Road West: A Journey in History (London: Chatto & Windus, New York: Dial Press, 1971)
- Literary Britain: A Reader's Guide to Its Writers and Landmarks (New York: Harper & Row, 1980)
