= Teresa Cohen =

American mathematician

- Born: February 14, 1892; Baltimore, Maryland, U.S.
- Died: August 10, 1992 (aged 100)
- Education: Goucher College (BA); Johns Hopkins University (MA)
- Occupation: Mathematician

Teresa Cohen (February 14, 1892 – August 10, 1992) was an American mathematician.

== Early life and education ==
She was born in Baltimore, Maryland to Rebecca Sinsheimer and Benjamin Cohen. She graduated in 1909 from the Friends School of Baltimore whose teachers she credited with her interest in mathematics and teaching. She earned her Bachelor of Arts degree in mathematics and physics at Goucher College in 1912. Cohen was resident fellow at Goucher from 1912 to 1913. In 1915, she earned a Master of Arts degree from Johns Hopkins University where she later earned her PhD in 1918. She was one of the first women in the United States to earn a doctorate in Mathematics. She completed her dissertation entitled "Investigations on the Plane Quartic" under doctoral advisor Frank Morley. Cohen also acknowledged the support of professors Cohen and Arthur Byron Coble of Johns Hopkins, and Clara Latimer Bacon and Florence Lewis of Goucher College.

== Career ==
Dr. Cohen was invited to join the faculty of The Pennsylvania State University in 1920 and became the first woman to serve on the Mathematics faculty. She advanced to the rank of full professor, one of only a handful of women to have that status at Penn State at that time. Due to University regulations she officially retired in 1962, but she maintained an office in the Department of Mathematics and tutored students for free until 1985 at the age of 94, when an accident forced her to return to her native Baltimore and enter a nursing home.

She had been a member of the American Mathematical Society, the Mathematical Association of America, Pi Mu Epsilon, and Sigma Delta Epsilon, the national honor society for women in science.

The works she published included four papers on investigations of the plane quartic, and a co-authored paper with William Knight about the convergence and divergence of the p-series

$$\sum_{n=1}^\infty n^{-p},$$

in which they gave proofs that could be understood by persons not familiar with the integral test for convergence of a series.

== Personal life ==
Aside from teaching, mathematics, and her local synagogue, Dr. Cohen's main interest was music. She was an amateur violinist. Cohen died of pneumonia in Baltimore in 1992 at the age of 100. She was survived by her sister, nieces, and a nephew. At the time of her death, Cohen was the oldest surviving Goucher College alumna and member of the Mathematical Association of America. The Teresa Cohen Tutorial Endowment Fund at Pennsylvania State University was established in her honor. She was interred at Temple Oheb Shalom cemetery.
