= William Wistar Comfort =

President of Haverford College (1874-1955)

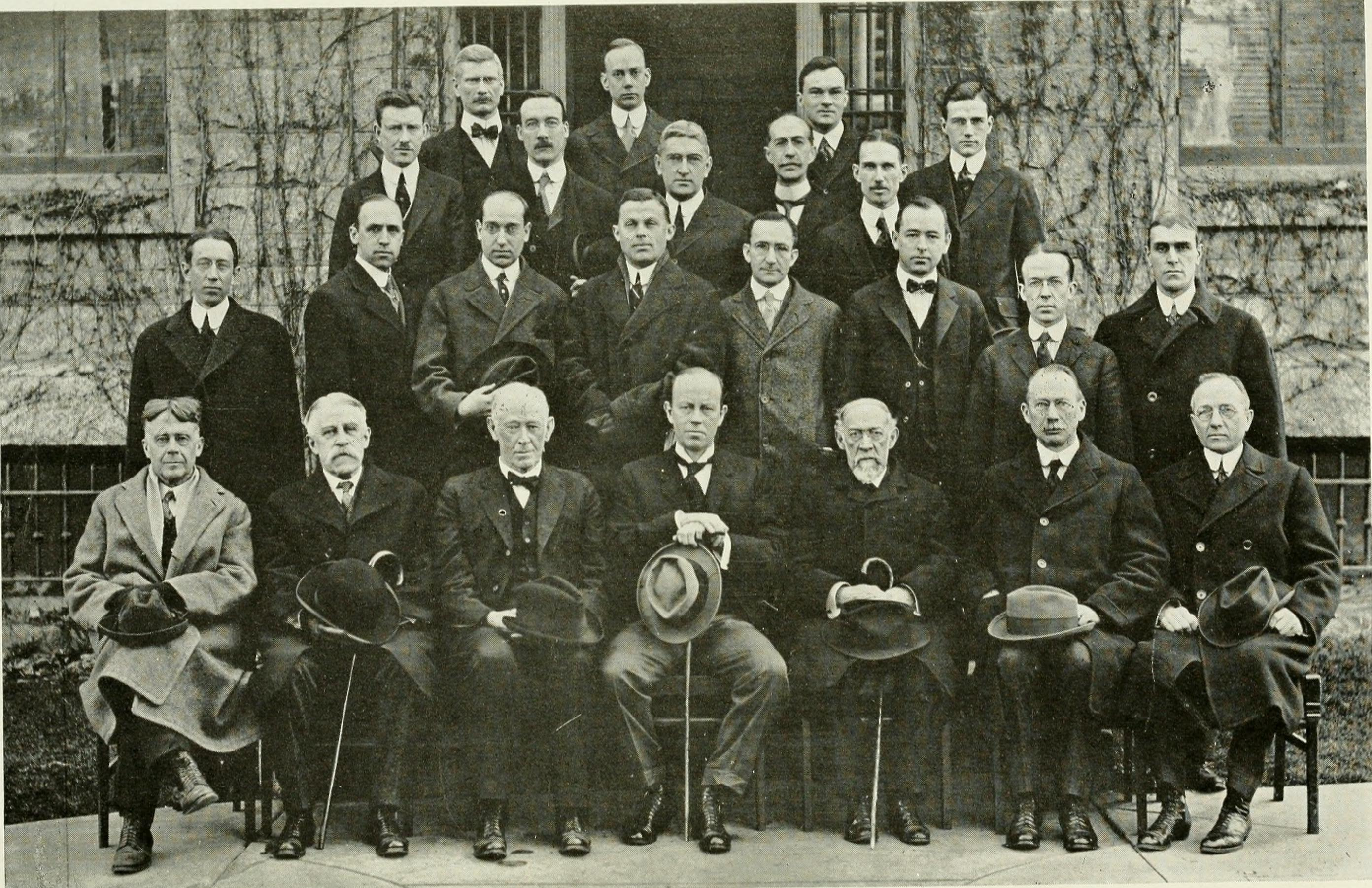
- William Wistar Comfort, at Haverford College, 1918
- Born: May 27, 1874; Bryn Mawr, Pennsylvania
- Died: December 24, 1955 (aged 81)
- Spouse: Mary Foles

William Wistar Comfort (May 27, 1874 – December 24, 1955) was president of Haverford College.

== Life ==
Comfort was born in Germantown, Pennsylvania and raised a Quaker. He graduated from Haverford College in 1894 and received a Ph.D. from Harvard University in 1902 with the dissertation "The Development of the Character Types in the French Chansons de Geste". Later he translated from Old French four 12th-century Arthurian Romances by Chrétien de Troyes (Modern Library, 1914) and the 13th-century Queste del Saint Graal (Quest of the Holy Grail). He was a polymath, with other written works on such topics as Quakerism, children's literature, and the poet William Cowper.

Comfort served as President of Haverford College for 23 years, from 1917 to 1940, and was succeeded by journalist Felix Morley.

He continued teaching until 1953, and died at his home on campus in 1955. He was survived by his wife of 53 years, Mary (née Foles), five children, and several grandchildren, including a mathematician named after him (de:W. Wistar Comfort). His personal papers are held at Haverford.
