= Frank Morley =

English–American mathematician (1860–1937)

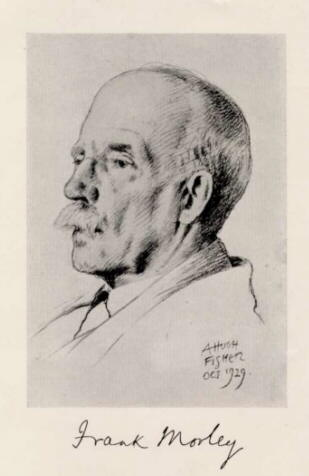
- Born: September 9, 1860; Woodbridge, Suffolk, England
- Died: October 17, 1937 (aged 77); Baltimore, Maryland
- Education: King's College, Cambridge
- Known for: Morley's trisector theorem
- Scientific career
- Fields: Mathematics
- Workplaces: Bath College; Haverford College; Johns Hopkins University
- Doctoral students: Clara Latimer Bacon; Harry Bateman; Leonard Blumenthal; Walter B. Carver; Arthur Coble; Teresa Cohen; Aubrey E. Landry; Francis Murnaghan; Boyd Patterson; Mabel M. Young

Frank Morley (September 9, 1860 – October 17, 1937) was a leading mathematician, known mostly for his teaching and research in the fields of algebra and geometry. Among his mathematical accomplishments was the discovery and proof of the celebrated Morley's trisector theorem in elementary plane geometry.

He led 50 Ph.D. students, including Clara Latimer Bacon, to their degrees, and was said to be

... one of the more striking figures of the relatively small group of men who initiated that development which, within his own lifetime, brought Mathematics in America from a minor position to its present place in the sun.

== Life ==
Morley was born in the town of Woodbridge in Suffolk, England. His parents were Elizabeth Muskett and Joseph Roberts Morley, Quakers who ran a china shop. After being educated at Woodbridge School, Morley went on to King's College, Cambridge (B.A., 1884). The young man was a chess prodigy and played friendly games with George Biddell Airy who lived nearby. It was Airy that suggested that Frank attend Cambridge University. Morely taught at Bath College for three years. He took his holidays in Woodbridge and frequented Simpson's Chess Divan on the Strand, London when returning to Bath. There he played peers such as Henry Bird .

In 1887, Morley moved to Pennsylvania. He taught at Haverford College until 1900, when he became chairman of the mathematics department at Johns Hopkins University. His publications include Elementary Treatise on the Theory of Functions (1893), with James Harkness; and Introduction to the Theory of Analytic Functions (1898). In 1897, he was elected to the American Philosophical Society. He was elected to the American Academy of Arts and Sciences in 1917. He was President of the American Mathematical Society from 1919 to 1920 and was the editor of the American Journal of Mathematics from 1900 to 1921. He was an invited speaker at the International Congress of Mathematicians in 1912 at Cambridge (England), in 1924 at Toronto, and in 1936 at Oslo.

In 1933 he and his son Frank Vigor Morley published the "stimulating volume" Inversive Geometry. The book develops complex numbers as a tool for geometry and function theory. Some non-standard terminology is used such as "base-circle" for unit circle and "turn" for a point on it.

He died in Baltimore, Maryland, at age 77.

He had three sons: novelist Christopher Morley; Pulitzer Prize-winning columnist, journalist, and college president Felix Morley; and Frank Vigor Morley, also a mathematician.

== Works ==
- 1893: (with James Harkness) A treatise on the theory of functions (New York: Macmillan)
- 1898: (with James Harkness) Introduction to the Theory of Analytic Functions (G.E.Stechert And Company)
- 1919: On the Lüroth Quartic Curve
- 1933: (with son Frank Vigor Morley) Inversive Geometry, Ginn & Co., now available from HathiTrust

== See also ==
- cis
- Turn
- Lüroth quartic
- Morley centers
- Petersen–Morley theorem
