= Justin B. Ries =

American marine scientist

Justin Baker Ries
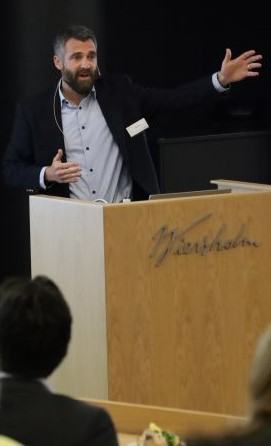
- Ries in 2023
- Born: Baltimore, Maryland
- Education: Franklin and Marshall College Johns Hopkins University
- Known for: Ocean acidification, biomineralization, and carbon sequestration research
- Awards: Phi Beta Kappa, Sigma Xi, Hanse-Wissenschaftskolleg Fellowship (Germany), Woods Hole Oceanographic Institution Ocean and Climate Change Postdoctoral Fellowship, National Academy of Inventors
- Scientific career
- Fields: Ocean acidification, carbon sequestration, global warming, biomineralization, paleoceanography
- Workplaces: Northeastern University, University of North Carolina at Chapel Hill, Woods Hole Oceanographic Institution, California Institute of Technology, Johns Hopkins University
- Thesis: Experiments on the effect of secular variation in seawater Mg/Ca (calcite and aragonite seas) on calcareous biomineralization (2005)
- Website: rieslab.sites.northeastern.edu

Justin Baker Ries is an American marine scientist, best known for his contributions to ocean acidification, carbon sequestration, and biomineralization research.

== Biography ==
Ries was born in Baltimore, Maryland, and attended the Friends School of Baltimore. He received a B.A. from Franklin and Marshall College and a Ph.D. from the Johns Hopkins University for a dissertation 'Experiments on the effect of secular variation in seawater Mg/Ca (calcite and aragonite seas) on calcareous biomineralization'. He received postdoctoral training at the Johns Hopkins University, the Woods Hole Oceanographic Institution, and the California Institute of Technology. Ries was a professor at the University of North Carolina at Chapel Hill for five years before becoming a professor at Northeastern University in 2013. At Northeastern, he is affiliated with the Department of Marine and Environmental Sciences, the Marine Science Center, and the Institute for Coastal Sustainability.

== Major discoveries ==
Ries is best known for his contributions to ocean acidification and biomineralization research. He and his colleagues made the publicized and controversial discovery that anthropogenic CO_{2}-induced ocean acidification does not negatively impact all species of marine calcifying organisms, but can also have neutral and even positive effects on some species. Ries also discovered that ocean acidification can alter the shell mineralogy, shell structure, predator-prey dynamics, and calcifying fluid pH of marine organisms, and produced the first geochemical model of the calcifying fluid that could predict organisms' responses to future ocean acidification. Ries and colleagues are also credited with discovering that the current rate of CO_{2}-induced ocean acidification is the fastest in Earth history and that many species of marine calcifiers today inhabit seawater that is already undersaturated with respect to their shell mineral.

== Inventions ==
Ries holds carbon sequestration patents describing biologically and geologically inspired methods for removing and mineralizing CO_{2} from the flue-streams of fossil-fuel-fired power plants and transoceanic vessels, production of carbon-negative cement, and alleviating bottlenecks in the global carbon cycle.

== Honors ==
Honors include induction into the Phi Beta Kappa and Sigma Xi honor societies, receipt of the German Hanse-Wissenschaftskolleg Award and the Woods Hole Oceanographic Institution Ocean and Climate Change Postdoctoral Fellowship. Ries was elected into the National Academy of Inventors in 2024.
