= Mabel Minerva Young =

American mathematician at Wellesley College

- Born: July 18, 1872; Worcester, Massachusetts
- Died: March 4, 1963 (aged 90); Wellesley, Massachusetts
- Education: Wellesley College
- Occupation: Mathematician
- Known for: Lewis Attenbury Stimson Professor of Mathematics at Wellesley College

Mabel Minerva Young (1872 – 1963) was an American mathematician active at Wellesley College.

== Life ==
Young was born July 18, 1872, in Worcester, Massachusetts. She began study at Wellesley College in 1894. Going to graduate study at Columbia University, she graduated with a master's degree in 1899. First she taught English at Northfield Seminary. In 1904 she began her long service at Wellesley College, beginning as an assistant in mathematics and becoming a full professor.

Taking a leave of absence, she studied for her Ph.D. with Frank Morley at Johns Hopkins University. Her thesis was titled "Dupin's cyclide as a self-dual surface". With her doctoral degree, Young was eventually promoted to professor and became Lewis Attenbury Stimson Professor of Mathematics at Wellesley College.

In 1933 Young contributed an article to American Mathematical Monthly on a configuration of triangles associated with a parabola π. Let π be a parabola, p and q fixed tangents to π that intersect at T. Then a variable tangent to π forms a triangle with p and q. The variability of this tangent describes the "single infinity of triangles". The corresponding orthocenters, circumcenters, centroids, and centers of the nine-point circle are approached using projective properties of the triangles.

Young became emeritus professor in 1941. She died March 4, 1963, at Wellesley.

== Solutions of AMM problems ==
One of the features of American Mathematical Monthly is a section devoted to problems articulated by readers, and eventual solutions of said problems. The published solutions are chosen for their elegance, and five involving geometry were by Mabel Young.

Given a point and a circle, find the locus of second circles where the radical axis of the two circles lies on the given point. Young's analytical geometry solution established a condition on the radii.

A given segment subtends an angle from a point on another line. As the point moves along its line, find the envelope of the bisectors of the angles. Young's solution established the class of the envelope curve using projective geometry.

Let a point and a pair of intersecting planes be fixed. Then as a variable line lies on the point, find the locus of the midpoint of the segment determined by the planes. Young's solution starts with a line p through the point and parallel to the intersection of the planes. She identified the locus as a hyperbolic cylinder through use of a third parallel midway between the others that is the projective harmonic conjugate of a line at infinity.

In a triangle ABC the feet of the altitudes and midpoints of the sides are used to define three involutions. The problem was to show that the double points of these involutions are three pairs of opposite vertices of a complete quadrilateral. Young's solution used the radical axis of the circumcircle and nine-point circle of the triangle.

Young proposed construction of a strophoid: Form triangle AOB from a fixed point A and a variable B on circle centered at O. Then the locus of the orthocenter of AOB is a strophoid.

Another problem required the concurrence of three lines determined by a triangle's altitudes and angle bisectors. Young's solution pointed to the Gergonne point and Nagel point of the triangle to obtain the concurrence.
