= Petersen–Morley theorem =

Geometric construction regarding 3 skew lines in space

In geometry, the Petersen–Morley theorem states that, if a, b, c are three general skew lines in space, if a′, b′, c′ are the lines of shortest distance respectively for the pairs (b,c), (c,a) and (a,b), and if p, q and r are the lines of shortest distance respectively for the pairs (a,a′), (b,b′) and (c,c′), then there is a single line meeting at right angles all of p, q, and r.

The theorem is named after Johannes Hjelmslev (who published his work on this result under his original name Johannes Trolle Petersen) and Frank Morley.
