= Jesper Rask =

Danish footballer (born 1988)

Personal information
- Full name: Jesper Rask
- Date of birth: 18 July 1988 (age 38)
- Place of birth: Hørning, Denmark
- Height: 1.96 m (6 ft 5 in)
- Position: Goalkeeper

Youth career
- AGF

Senior career*
Years	Team	Apps	(Gls)
2007–2010	AGF	0	(0)
2010–2020	Hobro IK	299	(0)
- * Club domestic league appearances and goals

Jesper Rask (born 18 July 1988) is a Danish retired footballer who played as a goalkeeper.

== Career ==
Rask made his senior debut for AGF 29 October 2008 in a Danish Cup round of 16 match against OB, after then starting goalkeeper Steffen Rasmussen fell out with a hand injury prior to the game, and second goalkeeper Morten Hyldgaard was sidelined in the 80th minute with a thigh injury. Rask thus became the third AGF goalkeeper to make his debut against OB in recent times, when Steffen Rasmussen and Erik Boye also started their careers in AGF with a match against OB.

Rask moved to Hobro IK in 2010, after his contract with AGF expired. In the 2013–14 season, he was part of a Hobro-team which secured promotion to the Danish Superliga, four years after having promoted from the third tier 2nd Division. Hobro's successful season came as a surprise, as it had barely secured survival in the second tier the season before. On 2 May 2014, shortly before promotion was a fact, he had extended his contract until the summer of 2016.

On 6 March 2020, Rask announced his retirement from football after the 2019–20 season, following a 10-year tenure at Hobro.
