= Hørning =

- town
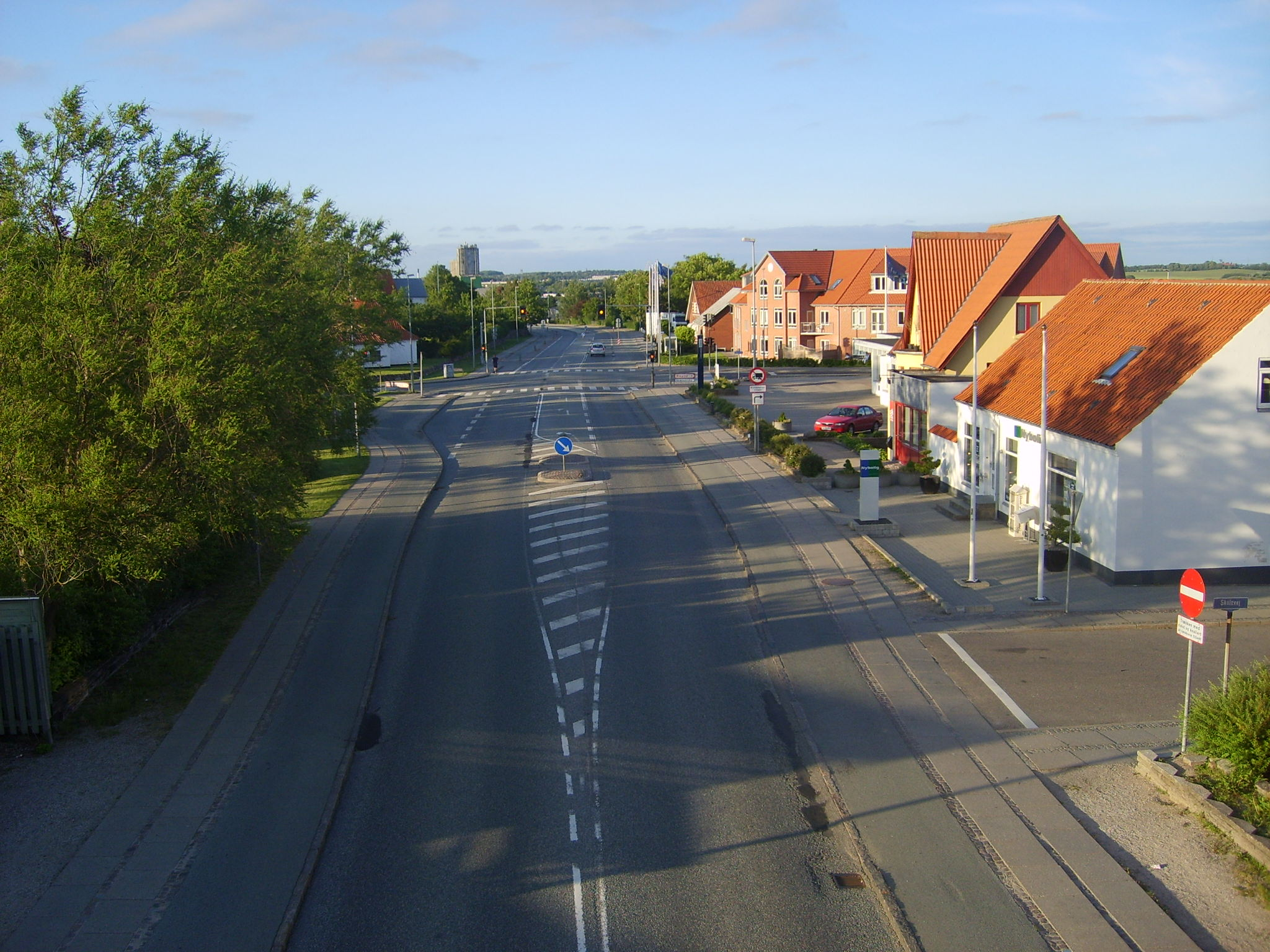
- Center of Hørning

- Location in Denmark Hørning (Central Denmark Region)
- Coordinates: 56°5′6″N 10°2′11″E
- Country: Denmark
- Region: Region Midtjylland
- Municipality: Skanderborg

Area
  - Urban: 4.2 km^{2} (1.6 sq mi)

Population (2026)
  - Urban: 8,572
  - Urban density: 2,000/km^{2} (5,300/sq mi)
  - Gender: 4,297 males and 4,275 females
- Time zone: UTC+1 (CET)
  - Summer (DST): UTC+2 (CEST)
- Postal code: DK-8362 Hørning

Hørning is a town in central Denmark with a population of 8,572 (1 January 2026), located in Skanderborg Municipality on the peninsula of Jutland. Today Hørning is a southwestern suburb of Aarhus located between Aarhus and Skanderborg.

Hørning should not be mistaken for Herning which is the bigger, more metropolitan city in Jutland where the regional train passing through Hørning is also destined to.

== Etymology ==
Hørning got its name from a bend in the main road that runs through the town. In Danish, a bend can be loosely translated to "Hjørne" (Corner), and "ing" (People) is a typical ending for city names in Denmark, dating the name to the Middle Ages. Over the years the "j" disappeared, and thus the name became Hørning. The bend in the main road is close by "Hørning Kro", the town inn. On the other side of the bend, you'll find the old rider school, which was a commoners' school built by King Frederick IV.

== Notable people ==
- Johannes Hjelmslev (1873 in Hørning – 1950) a mathematician who worked in geometry and the history of geometry
- Jesper Rask (born 1988 in Hørning) a Danish football goalkeeper, 294 caps with Hobro IK
- Stig Tøfting (born 1969) a Danish football player, turning out for Bolton Wanderers F.C. and Hamburger SV
- Nicklas Nielsen (born 1997 in Hørning) a Danish Ferrari factory racing driver and 2024 24 Hours of Le Mans overall winner
- Alexander Lind (born 26 june 2002) a Danish football player
