= Clara Latimer Bacon =

American mathematician

Clara Latimer Bacon (13 August 1866 – 14 April 1948) was a mathematician and professor of mathematics at Goucher College. She was the first woman to earn a PhD in mathematics from Johns Hopkins University.

== Biography ==
Bacon was the daughter of Larkin Crouch Bacon and Louisa Latimer. She was born in Hills Grove, McDonough County, Illinois, the eldest of her parents four children. She also had four other half siblings. Bacon attended North Abingdon High School and begun her college life at Hedding Collegiate Seminary.

She graduated from Hedding College in Abingdon, Illinois, in 1886 with a bachelor's degree (the degree of PhB). She achieved a second bachelor's degree from Wellesley College in 1890. Later, Bacon taught in a private school in Litchfield, Kentucky and in three different schools over seven years. Bacon studied for her master's degree at the University of Chicago, completing her thesis in 1903 and graduating in September 1904, after six summers of study while continuing to work full time at the Woman's College of Baltimore.

In 1907, Johns Hopkins University had been admitted the women officially. Bacon applied to Hopkins at the same time. She achieved her PhD from Johns Hopkins University in 1911, one of only four women to receive a PhD from the university that year, the first year that women were granted PhDs without special approval from the trustees. At Johns Hopkins, Bacon was a student of the geometer Frank Morley, who was her dissertation adviser. Her thesis was published in American Journal of Mathematics in 1913. Her research in her master's and PhD theses was on planar geometry.

She was emeritus professor of mathematics at Goucher College, formerly known as Women's College Baltimore, in Maryland, US, after working on the faculty from 1897 to 1934. She began teaching there in 1897, at the invitation of Dr John Franklin Goucher, and in 1905 became an associate professor, and in 1914 a full professor. Bacon was a member of the American Mathematical Society and the Mathematical Association of America. She was president of the Baltimore chapter of the American Association of University Professors and supported the League of Women Voters.

A student hall of residence at Goucher College, Bacon House, is named in her honour.

She died on 14 April 1948, aged 81.
