= Spinning House =

Workhouse and prison in Cambridge, England

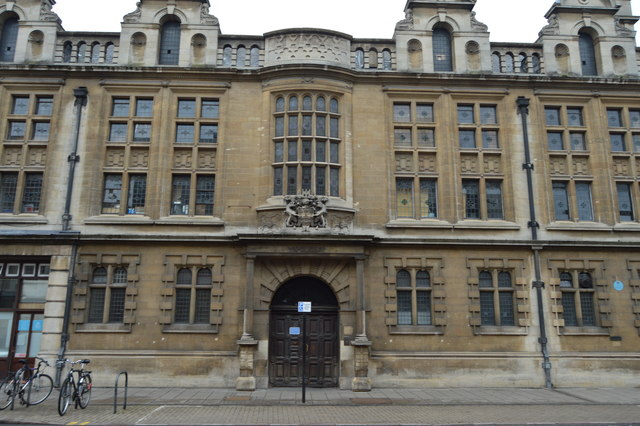
'Hobson House' built as a police station (1901) on the site of the Spinning House on St Andrew's Street, Cambridge, now council offices

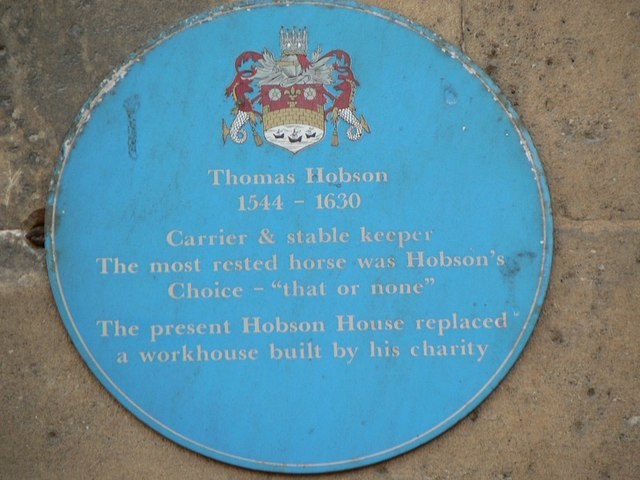
Blue plaque, Hobson House

The Spinning House, also known as the Cambridge House of Correction and Hobson's Bridewell, was a workhouse and a prison built in St Andrew's Street, Cambridge in the 1600s and demolished in 1901. In the Victorian era, it held local women suspected by the Proctors of having a corrupting influence on the male student population, until this power was removed by Act of Parliament in 1893.

This removal followed the high-profile case of 17-year-old Daisy Hopkins, who was arrested in 1891 for the crime of "walking with a member of the university"; she sued the Proctor and lost in a trial that severely attacked her moral character but nevertheless prompted public debate about the legitimacy of such arrests.

The site of the Spinning House is marked by a blue plaque.
