= Ragsdale conjecture =

The Ragsdale conjecture is a mathematical conjecture that concerns the possible arrangements of real algebraic curves embedded in the projective plane. It was proposed by Virginia Ragsdale in her dissertation in 1906 and was disproved in 1979. It has been called "the oldest and most famous conjecture on the topology of real algebraic curves".

== Formulation of the conjecture ==
Ragsdale's dissertation, "On the Arrangement of the Real Branches of Plane Algebraic Curves," was published by the American Journal of Mathematics in 1906. The dissertation was a treatment of Hilbert's sixteenth problem, which had been proposed by Hilbert in 1900, along with 22 other unsolved problems of the 19th century; it is one of the handful of Hilbert's problems that remains wholly unresolved. Ragsdale formulated a conjecture that provided an upper bound on the number of topological circles of a certain type, along with the basis of evidence.

== Conjecture ==
Ragsdale's main conjecture is as follows.

Assume that an algebraic curve of degree 2k contains p even and n odd ovals. Ragsdale conjectured that

$$p \le \tfrac32 k(k-1) + 1 \quad\text{and}\quad n \le \tfrac32 k(k-1).$$

She also posed the inequality

$$| 2(p-n)-1 | \le 3k^2 - 3k + 1,$$

and showed that the inequality could not be further improved. This inequality was later proved by Petrovsky.

== Disproving the conjecture ==
The conjecture was held of very high importance in the field of real algebraic geometry for most of the twentieth century. Later, in 1980, Oleg Viro introduced a technique known as "patchworking algebraic curves" and used to generate a counterexample to the conjecture.

In 1993, Ilia Itenberg produced additional counterexamples to the Ragsdale conjecture, so Viro and Itenberg wrote a paper in 1996 discussing their work on disproving the conjecture using the "patchworking" technique.

The problem of finding a sharp upper bound remains unsolved.
