= Virginia Ragsdale =

American mathematician

- Virginia Ragsdale
- Born: December 13, 1870; Jamestown, North Carolina, US
- Died: June 4, 1945 (aged 74); Greensboro, North Carolina, US
- Education: Guilford College; Bryn Mawr College
- Known for: Ragsdale conjecture
- Scientific career
- Fields: Mathematics
- Workplaces: Woman's College in Greensboro
- Thesis: On the Arrangement of the Real Branches of Plane Algebraic Curves (1904)
- Doctoral advisor: Charlotte Scott

Virginia Ragsdale (December 13, 1870 – June 4, 1945) was a teacher and mathematician specializing in algebraic curves. She is most known as the creator of the Ragsdale conjecture.

== Early life ==
Ragsdale was born on a farm in Jamestown, North Carolina the third child of John Sinclair Ragsdale and Emily Jane Idol. John was an officer in the Civil War, a teacher in the Flint Hill School, and later a state legislator.

Virginia Ragsdale descended from Godfrey Ragsdale, a settler of the new Jamestown colony. Jamestown was raided by a native-American tribe in 1644 led by the uncle of Pocahontas, during which Godfrey and his wife were killed, but their infant son, Godfrey, Jr., survived. Ragsdale was then descended from the infant.

Virginia documented her early years in a paper titled "Our Early Home and Childhood", writing:

One of my earliest recollections was a little trundle bed where Ida [her sister] and I slept together. … The house had no conveniences. Water had to be carried from a spring at the foot of the hill, milk and butter were kept there, washing was done there.
In the first years or two, there were three or four boarders, boys or young men, who came to attend Father's school.
Grandma (Idol), mother and Aunt Julia had all done their bit before and during the war, weaving blankets (and) jeans for men's suits, which were sold to Greensboro merchants in exchange for silk and other goods.

— Virginia Ragsdale, Our Early Home and Childhood

== Study ==
As a junior, Ragsdale entered Salem Academy, and graduated in 1887 as valedictorian with an extra diploma in piano. Ragsdale attended Guilford College in Greensboro, North Carolina, where she earned her B.S. in 1892. She was active in student life, establishing a Y.M.C.A. on campus, expanding collegiate athletics, and contributing to the formation the Guilford's Alumni Association.

Ragsdale was awarded the first scholarship from Bryn Mawr College for the top scholar Guilford College. She studied physics at Bryn Mawr College, obtaining an A.B. degree in 1896. She was elected European fellow for the class of 1896, but waited a year before traveling, working as an assistant demonstrator in physics and mathematics graduate student at Bryn Mawr.

Together with two of her colleagues (including Emilie Martin), she spent 1897-98 abroad at the University of Göttingen, attending lectures of Felix Klein and David Hilbert. After her return to the United States, she taught in Baltimore for three years until a second scholarship, by the Baltimore Association for the Promotion of University Education of Women, permitted her to return to Bryn Mawr college to complete her Ph.D. under the direction of Charlotte Scott.

Her dissertation, "On the Arrangement of the Real Branches of Plane Algebraic Curves," was published in 1906 by the American Journal of Mathematics. Her dissertation addressed the 16th of Hilbert's problems, for which Ragsdale formulated a conjecture that provided an upper bound on the number of topological circles of a certain type. Her result is called the Ragsdale conjecture; it was an open problem for 90 years until counterexamples were derived by Oleg Viro (1979) and Ilya Itenberg (1994).

== Career ==
After completing her degree, Ragsdale taught in New York City and Dr. Sach's School for Girls until 1905. She was head of the Baldwin School in Bryn Mawr from 1906 to 1911, and a reader for Charlotte Scott from 1908 to 1910. Ragsdale returned to North Carolina in 1911 to accept a mathematics position at Woman's College in Greensboro (now known as the University of North Carolina at Greensboro). She remained there for almost two decades and served as department head from 1926 to 1928. She encouraged the school to buy a telescope, and the math department to add statistics to the curriculum.

In 1928, she retired from teaching in order to care for her mother's health and help manage the family farm. After the death of her mother in 1934, she built a house at Guilford College, where she spent her last years gardening, working with furniture, working on family genealogy, holding book clubs, and visiting with students. Upon her death, she donated her house to Guilford College, where it housed the faculty, alumni, and visitors. In 1965 President of Guilford Grimsley Hobbs moved into Ragsdale's house, and it has been the home of the college's president ever since.

== See also ==
- Ragsdale conjecture
- Algebraic curves
- Emilie Martin
