= Lincoln Ragsdale =

African-American rights activist and Tuskegee Airman (1926–1995)

- Born: July 27, 1926; Tulsa, Oklahoma
- Died: June 9, 1995 (aged 68); Paradise Valley, Arizona
- Occupations: Tuskegee Airman, community organizer
- Known for: Civil Rights Movement
- Spouse: Eleanor Ragsdale

Lincoln Johnson Ragsdale Sr. (July 27, 1926 – June 9, 1995) was an influential leader in the Phoenix-area Civil Rights Movement. Known for his outspokenness, Ragsdale was instrumental in various reform efforts in the Valley, including voting rights and the desegregation of schools, neighborhoods, and public accommodations.

== Early life ==
Ragsdale was born on July 27, 1926, to mortician Hartwell Ragsdale and schoolteacher Onlia Violet Ragsdale (née Perkins) in Tulsa, Oklahoma, and subsequently grew up in Ardmore, Oklahoma. In 1921, Hartwell's mortuary was located in the Greenwood neighborhood of Tulsa, the site of the Tulsa race massacre, which he narrowly escaped; the business was burned down by a mob along with most other businesses in that black community. Hartwell's oldest brother, William Ragsdale Jr., was a taxi driver who served whites and blacks and was the first of the six brothers, who started the family legacy of funeral service by opening the nation's first African-American funeral business still owned by the same family. Lincoln has said that he grew up hearing about it.

Onlia Ragsdale, the first person in her family to earn a college degree, was the president of the National Association of Colored Women's Oklahoma chapter. Hartwell's mortuary business, relocated to Ardmore, became a success and the Ragsdales lived more comfortably than most black families during the Great Depression. Theodore "Ted" Ragsdale, a cousin of Lincoln, followed in William Jr.'s footsteps to become Oklahoma NAACP president in the 1930s despite the earlier death of his brother. Lincoln's parents instilled in him the value of education. He attended the segregated Douglass High School in Ardmore, and around this time began to develop both his love for flying and his entrepreneurial acumen by earning his own money to pay a local pilot to take him up in his plane regularly.

== Military career ==
I wanted to be a pilot because I wanted to prove something. The papers said that blacks could not do it. I wanted to prove that we could do it. We were very segregated. The army was segregated. The navy was segregated. We couldn't use any of the facilities. We were treated as second-class citizens, but the only way to change something is to prove that you can do something.

— Lincoln Ragsdale, 1990

When Lincoln Ragsdale graduated high school in 1944, the new Tuskegee Airmen, a corps of black military pilots in World War II, appealed to both his interest in flying and in racial equality. He later remarked that he enlisted to refute the popular notion that blacks could not successfully fly planes. Trained at Tuskegee Army Air Corps Field in Alabama in 1945, he became part of the US Army's early integration effort.

In Alabama, Ragsdale experienced racially motivated violence firsthand, narrowly escaping a lynching at the hands of local police at the age of 19. As he tells it, Ragsdale, less deferential than normal because of his recent graduation and because he was accustomed to giving orders, had drawn the ire of a white gas station attendant, who alerted the police to his behavior. He was followed out of the station by a police car, and, after pulling over, brutally beaten by three officers with shotguns; one suggested killing him, but another objected because he was wearing a military uniform.

Ragsdale was transferred to Luke Air Force Base in Arizona for gunnery training, becoming one of the first black soldiers involved in the base's integration. Ragsdale later remarked upon his surprise at discovering the extent to which Phoenix was plagued by racism similar to the South's.

In November 1945, he was commissioned a second lieutenant in the United States Army Air Corps.

== Phoenix and entrepreneurship ==
After the war, he went on to settle in Phoenix in 1946, where he and brother Hartwell Ragsdale started a mortuary business, which was a traditional Ragsdale family profession. Ragsdale was initially unable to secure a loan, being rejected by all of the banks in town, until a stranger agreed to make a personal loan of $35,000 to start the business after hearing his story. This made Lincoln Ragsdale Arizona's first black funeral home owner in 1948. He would later graduate from Arizona State University, and also received a doctorate in business administration from Union Graduate School. In 1949, he married Eleanor Ragsdale, a local schoolteacher at Dunbar Elementary School who became an important activist in her own right.

Phoenix was just like Mississippi. People were just as bigoted. They had segregation. They had signs in many places 'Mexicans and Negroes not welcome.'

— Lincoln Ragsdale

Ragsdale's many business holdings over the years included the mortuary business, a real estate agency, a construction business, a restaurant and nightclub, various insurance companies in several states, an ambulance service, and a flower shop. During his years of activism, Ragsdale nevertheless became wealthy in his many business dealings. Ragsdale's original business model subverted Phoenix's discriminatory practices to his own economic gain. Because blacks and Hispanics were not permitted to patronize white establishments, he expected to be able to corner the market in his industry among those underserved groups—and while Hispanics were not major customers, his business with the small black community boomed.

However, Ragsdale, somewhat controversially for the time, began to specifically cater to white and Hispanic clientele in the 1960s, putting him at odds with the National Funeral Directors and Morticians Association, Inc., a black trade association. He employed white workers and took his name out of the business', renaming from "Ragsdale Mortuary" to "Universal Memorial Center." Ragsdale saw this business decision as part of his broader activism for racial integration: "I was almost bankrupt in 1965. There just wasn't enough business to support me, so I decided to go after the white business. We talk about integration but too often continue to work in all-black situations."

== Civil Rights-era activism ==
=== Early work ===
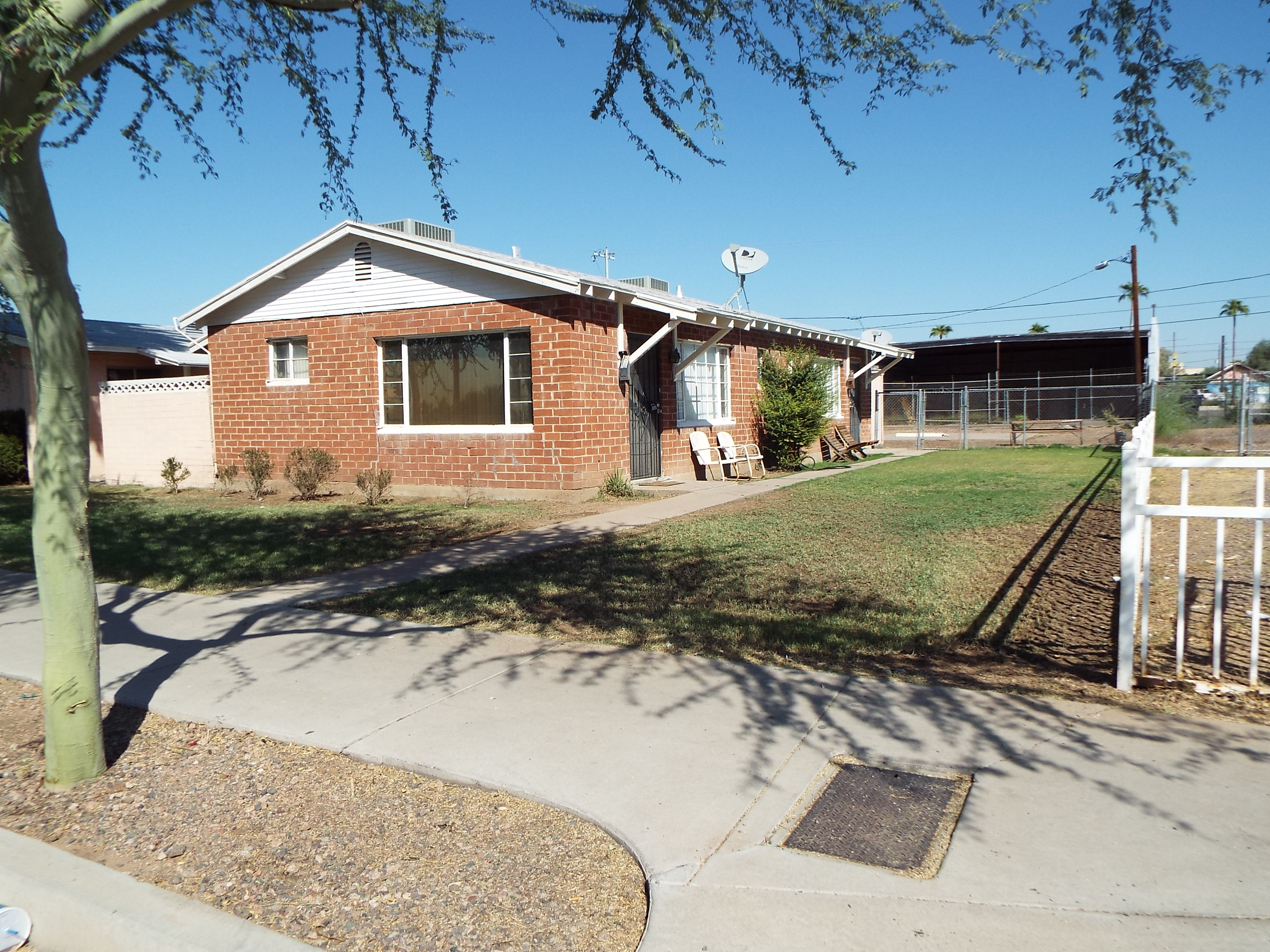
The first Ragsdale residence located at 1510 E. Jefferson St.

The Ragsdales were founding members of the Greater Phoenix Council for Civic Unity (GPCCU) in the late 1940s. One of Ragsdale's first forays into civil rights action was in a case that touched both his military and mortuary careers. In 1952, Ragsdale's business received the body of Pfc. Thomas Reed, a black soldier killed in the Korean War. While the family wanted to have him buried in the military veterans' plot at the Greenwood Memorial Park cemetery in Phoenix, cemeteries were segregated and the veterans' plot was all-white. Ragsdale worked with the GPCCU to publicize the controversy in the media both locally and nationally, getting a fellow activist, Thomasena Grigsby, to publish an editorial in the Chicago Defender. After a three-month standoff in which the body was left unburied by Ragsdale in a mortuary vault, the funeral directors gave in and voted to integrate the cemetery; Ragsdale went on to work for the integration of other cemeteries.

In April 1951, Ragsdale was elected to the GPCCU board of directors. He and the GPCCU advocated in the Arizona Legislature for a law to desegregate Arizona's schools. The effort was also backed by some white leaders, notably Barry Goldwater. The law which passed only went so far as to allow school boards to voluntarily desegregate. While many districts, including Tucson's, did desegregate voluntarily, Phoenix schools did not. The GPCCU then campaigned for a local ballot initiative to desegregate Phoenix's schools, but it failed by a 2-to-1 margin.

In 1952, the Ragsdales, the GPCCU, and the NAACP funded a lawsuit against the white-only Phoenix Union High School on behalf of three black children against school segregation; Ragsdale helped raise the GPCCU's $5,000 contribution for the lawsuit. The suit challenged the legality of the law's segregation option, in effect contesting the law they had just lobbied for. The case, decided by Judge Fred C. Struckmeyer in the Maricopa County Superior Court, became the nation's first court decision declaring school segregation laws illegal, over a year prior to the Supreme Court's Brown v. Board of Education decision. Another case that year brought by the same lawyers against an elementary school agreed with Struckmeyer's decision.

=== Fighting housing discrimination ===
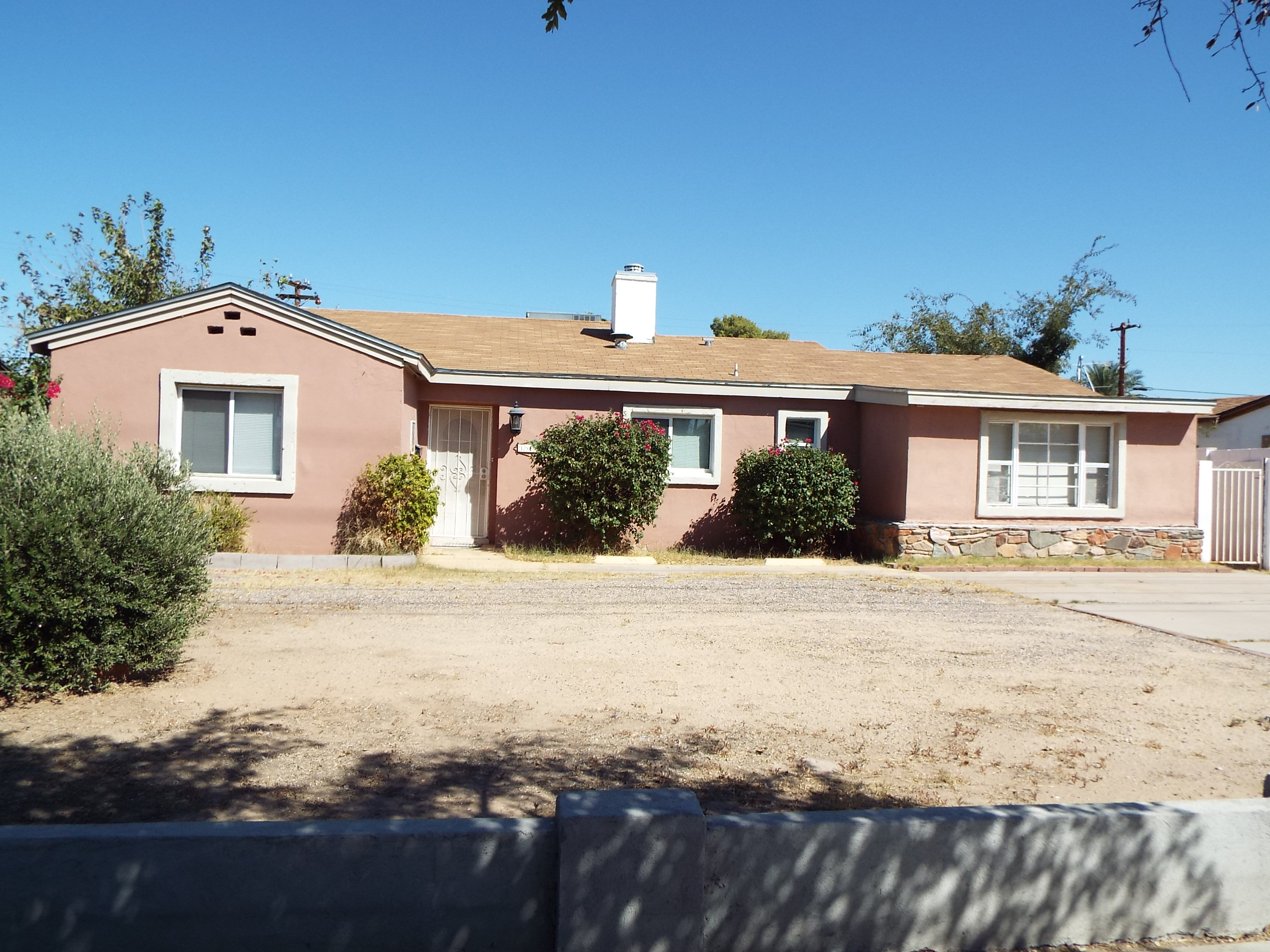
The Ragsdale Sr. House located at 1606 West Thomas Road

The Ragsdales made history in 1953 by moving into a home on West Thomas Road in the exclusive Encanto area north of the red line which separated the segregated white and black neighborhoods in Phoenix. In that era, blacks were excluded from home ownership in north of the neighborhoods along Van Buren Street by banks who refused them loans for such houses and real estate agents who refused to show the houses to blacks. Eleanor was a licensed real estate agent with knowledge of the market and also fair-skinned enough to pass for white, both of which allowed her to find a suitable home in a white neighborhood without arousing suspicion; Lincoln viewed the home at night, being driven through an alley behind the house. The Ragsdales, unable to buy the house themselves, asked a white friend of Eleanor to purchase the house in his own name and then transfer the title to them.

Enduring threats from neighbors, harassment from local police who stopped them while driving in their own neighborhood, and graffiti with racial epithets on their home, despite never being fully accepted in their own neighborhood the couple lived in the home for 17 years and raised their four children there. They became a local symbol of resistance to housing discrimination. The model the Ragsdales had established for circumventing the controls on black home ownership was repeated by other blacks, often aided by Eleanor, to move into other homes in the all-white area.

I looked suspicious. And all you have to do to look suspicious is to be driving a Cadillac and be black.

— Lincoln Ragsdale, 1992

=== NAACP and public accommodations ===
By the 1960s, Ragsdale and Rev. George B. Brooks, respectively vice-president and president of the Maricopa County NAACP chapter, were organizing protests and meeting with local business leaders to end workplace discrimination that barred blacks from skilled jobs. Ragsdale also began to target segregation in public accommodations and facilities, and in 1962, echoing the 1960 Greensboro Woolworth's sit-ins, Lincoln and Eleanor organized protests at the local Phoenix Woolworth's stores.

Ragsdale participated in the creation of the Action Citizens Committee and ran for Phoenix City Council in 1963 along with the Committee's slate of other candidates. While ultimately narrowly unsuccessful, the campaign drew attention to the lack of minorities and South Phoenix residents in government and led to the registration of many new African-American and Latino voters. In 1964 Ragsdale successfully lobbied the Phoenix City Council for passage of a public accommodations law, and nearly a year later Arizona passed a statewide civil rights law, both similar in nature to the federal Civil Rights Act of 1964. 1964 also saw Martin Luther King Jr. give a speech at Arizona State University at Ragsdale's invitation, after which the Ragsdales hosted him in their home.

=== Work with the Hispanic community ===
Throughout the 1950s and 1960s, the black population of Phoenix remained under 5% of the city's total and Hispanics outnumbered blacks 3-to-1, necessitating more multicultural organizing than occurred elsewhere in the Civil Rights Movement.

== Later life ==
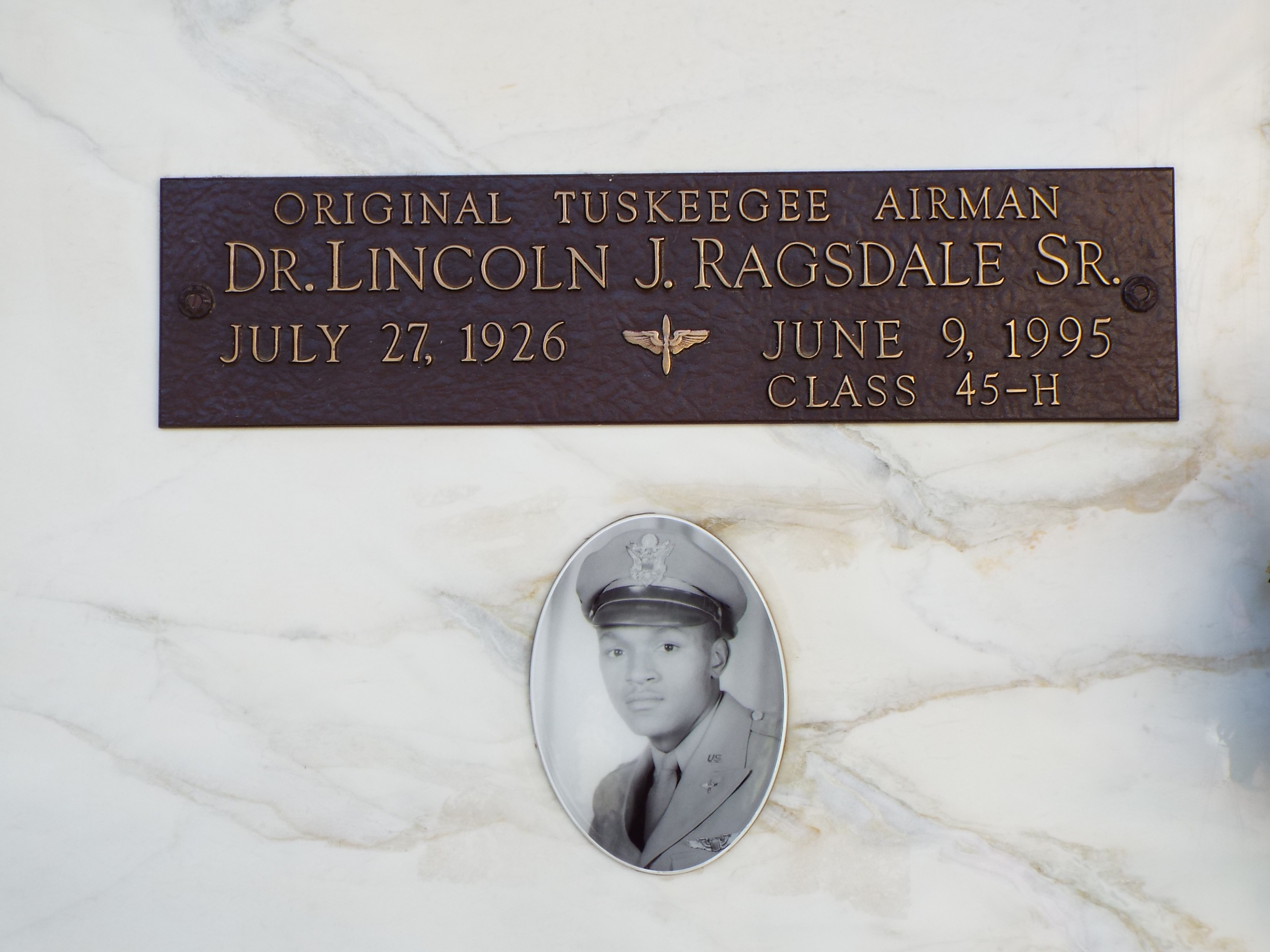
The crypt of Dr. Lincoln Johnson Ragsdale

As a pilot, Ragsdale served on the Phoenix Municipal Aeronautics Advisory Board in the 1970s. Ragsdale later became involved in the intense fight to create a statewide Martin Luther King Jr. Day in Arizona, which finally passed after a voter-approved ballot measure in 1992. Ragsdale died on June 9, 1995, of colon cancer in his Paradise Valley, Arizona, home. His crypt is located in the Serenity Mausoleum of Phoenix's Greenwood/Memory Lawn Mortuary & Cemetery.

The executive terminal at Phoenix's Sky Harbor International Airport was renamed the Lincoln J. Ragsdale Executive Terminal in his honor. The Links, Incorporated Phoenix Chapter, of which the Ragsdales were active members, contribute to the Arizona State University Dr. Lincoln J. Ragsdale Memorial Scholarship, named in his honor.
