= Guide to Kulchur =

1938 book by Ezra Pound

- Author: Ezra Pound
- Publisher: Faber & Faber
- Publication date: 1938

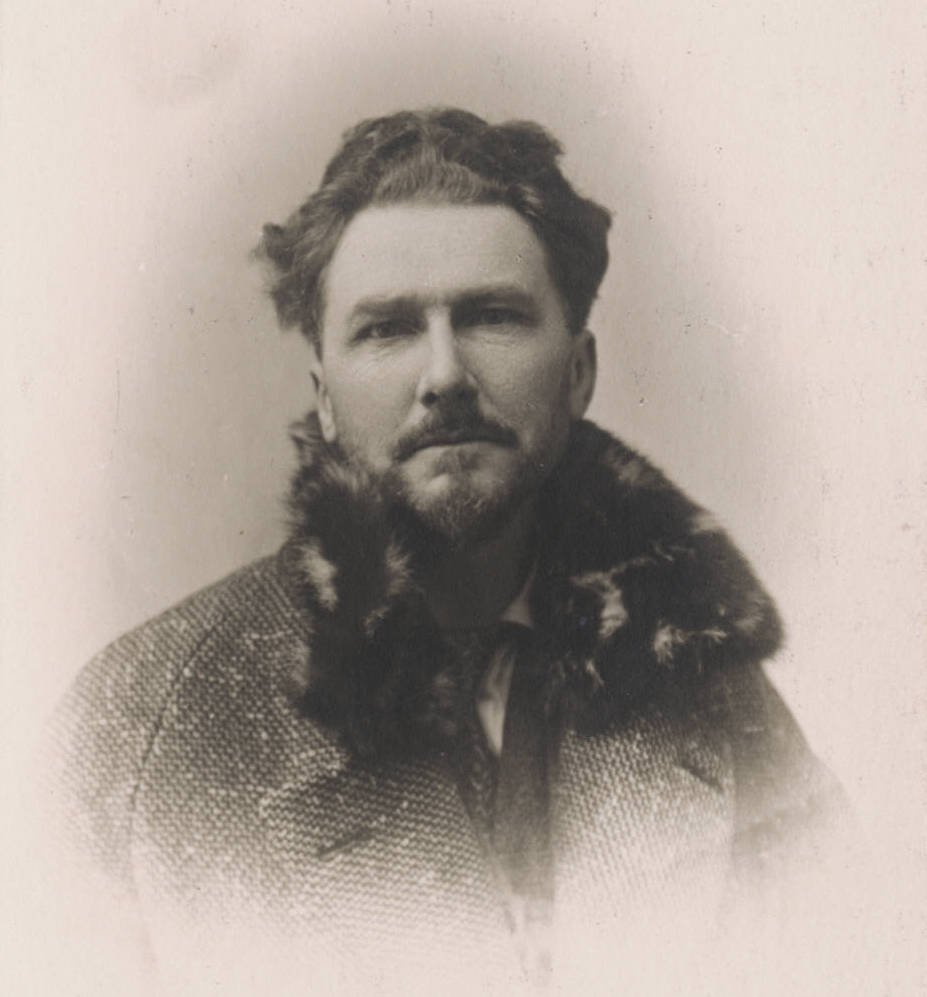
Ezra Pound (1885–1972), c. 1920

Guide to Kulchur is a non-fiction book by the American poet Ezra Pound. Published in London in July 1938 by Faber & Faber, the book examines 2,500 years of cultural history, beginning with the Analects of Confucius. The first chapter was published in Milan in June 1937 as a pamphlet, Confucius/Digest of the Analects, by Giovanni Scheiwiller.

A supporter of Benito Mussolini, Pound congratulates his friend Wyndham Lewis in the book for having "discovered" Adolf Hitler. "I hand it to him as a superior perception," he wrote. "Superior in relation to my own discovery of Mussolini." Lewis later rejected fascism.

== Publication details ==
- Pound, Ezra (1938). Guide to Kulchur. London: Faber & Faber.

== Works cited ==
- Araujo, Anderson (2018). A Companion to Ezra Pound’s Guide to Kulchur. Clemson University Press. ISBN 978-1-942954-38-5
- Hitchens, Christopher (April 2008). "A Revolutionary Simpleton". The Atlantic.
- Moody, A. David (2014). Ezra Pound: Poet. A Portrait of the Man and His Work. II: The Epic Years 1921–1939. Oxford: Oxford University Press. ISBN 978-0-19-921558-4
- Pound, Ezra (1966) [1938]. Guide to Kulchur. London: Peter Owen.
- Redman, Tim (1991). Ezra Pound and Italian Fascism. Cambridge: Cambridge University Press. ISBN 978-0-521-37305-0
