= Hjelmslev's theorem =

Theorem in plane geometry

The triples of red points on the two black lines have the same distances within each triple, so by Hjelmslev's theorem the three midpoints of corresponding pairs of points are on a single (green) line.

In geometry, Hjelmslev's theorem, named after Johannes Hjelmslev, is the statement that if points P, Q, R... on a line are isometrically mapped to points P´, Q´, R´... of another line in the same plane, then the midpoints of the segments PP´, QQ´, RR´... also lie on a line.

The proof is easy if one assumes the classification of plane isometries. If the given isometry is odd, in which case it is necessarily either a reflection in a line or a glide-reflection (the product of three reflections in a line and two perpendiculars to it), then the statement is true of any points in the plane whatsoever: the midpoint of PP´ lies upon the axis of the (glide-)reflection for any P. If the isometry is even, compose it with reflection in line PQR to obtain an odd isometry with the same effect on P, Q, R... and apply the previous remark.

The importance of the theorem lies in the fact that it has a different proof that does not presuppose the parallel postulate and is therefore valid in non-Euclidean geometry as well. By its help, the mapping that maps every point P of the plane to the midpoint of the segment P´P´´, where P´and P´´ are the images of P under a rotation (in either sense) by a given acute angle about a given center, is seen to be a collineation mapping the whole hyperbolic plane in a 1-1 way onto the inside of a disk, thus providing a good intuitive notion of the linear structure of the hyperbolic plane. In fact, this is called the Hjelmslev transformation.
