= Johannes Hjelmslev =

Danish mathematician

Johannes Trolle Hjelmslev (Danish: [ˈjelˀmsle̝w]; 7 April 1873 – 16 February 1950) was a mathematician from Hørning, Denmark. Hjelmslev worked in geometry and history of geometry. He was the discoverer and eponym of the Hjelmslev transformation, a method for mapping an entire hyperbolic plane into a circle with a finite radius. He was the father of Louis Hjelmslev.

Originally named Johannes Trolle Petersen, he changed his patronymic to the surname Hjelmslev to avoid confusion with Julius Petersen. Some of his results are known under his original name, including the Petersen–Morley theorem.

== Publications ==
- Johannes Hjelmslev, Grundprinciper for den infinitesimale Descriptivgeometri med Anvendelse paa Læren om variable Figurer. Afhandling for den philosophiske Doctorgrad, 1897
- Johannes Hjelmslev, Deskriptivgeometri: Grundlag for Forelæsninger paa Polyteknisk Læreanstalt, Jul. Gjellerup 1904
- Johannes Hjelmslev, Geometriske Eksperimenter, Jul. Gjellerup 1913
- Johannes Hjelmslev, Darstellende Geometrie, Teubner 1914
- Johannes Hjelmslev, Geometrische Experimente, Teubner 1915
- Johannes Hjelmslev, Lærebog i Geometri til Brug ved den Polytekniske Læreanstalt, Jul. Gjellerup 1918
- Johannes Hjelmslev, Die natürliche Geometrie- vier Vorträge, Hamburger Mathematische Einzelschriften 1923
- Johannes Hjelmslev, Om et af den danske matematiker Georg Mohr udgivet skrift Euclides Danicus, udkommet i Amsterdam i 1672", Matematisk Tidsskrift B, 1928, pp 1-7
- Johannes Hjelmslev, Grundlagen der projektiven Geometrie, 1929
- Johannes Hjelmslev, Beiträge zur Lebensbeschreibung von Georg Mohr, Det Kongelige Danske Videnskabernes Selskab, Math.-Fys. Meddelelser, Bd.11, 1931, Nr.4
- Johannes Hjelmslev, Grundlag for den projektive Geometri, Gyldendal 1943

== See also ==
- Hjelmslev's theorem
