= Felix Morley =

American journalist and college administrator (1894–1982)

- Born: Felix Muskett Morley; January 6, 1894; Haverford, Pennsylvania
- Died: March 13, 1982 (aged 88)
- Education: Haverford College, University of Oxford, Brookings Institution
- Occupations: Journalist, College President
- Notable work: The Society of Nations

Felix Muskett Morley (January 6, 1894 – March 13, 1982) was a Pulitzer Prize-winning journalist and college administrator from the United States.

== Biography ==
Morley was born in Haverford, Pennsylvania, his father being the mathematician Frank Morley. Like his brothers, Christopher and Frank, Felix was educated at Haverford College and earned a Rhodes Scholarship to University of Oxford in England. He earned a Guggenheim Fellowship to study the League of Nations in Geneva, Switzerland, which resulted in his book The Society of Nations (1933) and a Ph.D. from the Brookings Institution. Morley was raised within and remained a member of the Religious Society of Friends or Quakers.

From 1933 to 1940, Morley worked as editor for The Washington Post, winning, in 1936, the paper's first Pulitzer Prize, for his "distinguished editorial writing during the year." The Pulitzer Prize came after the Franklin D. Roosevelt's National Industrial Recovery Act was nullified by the U.S. Supreme Court. Morley had written that Roosevelt "turned his back on the traditions and principles of his party and gave tremendous support stimulus to the move for a complete political realignment in the United States."

In August 1940, Morley was fired from his position as editor of the Post by the paper's owner, Eugene Meyer. Meyer, a staunch economic conservative and opponent of the New Deal, nevertheless was a major proponent of Roosevelt's interventionist foreign policy and the need for America to support Great Britain in the fight against Hitler. That July, the Post, under Morley's direction, published an editorial criticizing Roosevelt's interventionism, arguing that the Monroe Doctrine not only pledged the United States to defend the Western Hemisphere from European intervention but also pledged the United States not to intervene in the affairs of Europe. The editorial argued that the best way to defend American interests was to defend the Western Hemisphere and not to involve itself with European quarrels. Morley's anti-interventionist editorial offended Meyer, who fired him a few weeks later. Meyer assured that the Post would only publish pro-interventionist editorials thereafter.

Later in 1940, Morley went on to succeed William Wistar Comfort as President of Haverford College. He also supported Wendell Willkie that year as presidential candidate. Morley said he lost faith in Roosevelt after his Judiciary Reorganization Bill of 1937 to pack the Supreme Court and that Roosevelt had a "debonair attitude of pulling tricks out of a bag."

Morley was one of the founding editors of Human Events in 1944, where he opposed federal overreach and foreign interventionism. However, he left Human Events in 1950 because of its aggressive military stance towards the Soviet Union. He was also one of the founding members of the classical liberal Mont Pelerin Society in 1946.

After resigning from Haverford College, he continued his journalistic work at NBC and for Nation's Business. He published his memoirs, For the Record, in 1977. Other books he published after the war were The Power in the People (1949), The Foreign Policy of the United States (1951) and Freedom and Federalism (1959). Also published, in 1956, is his utopian novel Gumption Island.

His grandson is the journalist Jefferson Morley.

== Works ==
- Unemployment Relief in Great Britain: A Study in State Socialism (1924)
- The Society of Nations: Its Organization and Constitutional Development (1932)
- The Power in the People (1949)
- The Foreign Policy of the United States (1951)
- (editor) Essays on Individuality (1958)
- Freedom and Federalism (1959)
- Freedom and the Laity (1961)
- (editor) The Necessary Conditions for a Free Society (1963)
- For the Record (1979)

== Sources ==
- Elizabeth A. Brennan; Elizabeth C. Clarage (1999). Who's Who of Pulitzer Prize Winners. Greenwood Publishing Group. p. 167. ISBN 978-1-57356-111-2.
