= Eleanor Ragsdale =

American civil rights activist (1926–1998)

- Born: Eleanor Dickey; February 23, 1926; Collingdale, Pennsylvania
- Died: May 5, 1998 (aged 72); Phoenix, Arizona
- Education: Cheyney University of Pennsylvania
- Occupations: Educator, real estate agent, activist
- Known for: Civil Rights Movement
- Spouse: Lincoln Ragsdale (m. 1949)

Eleanor Dickey Ragsdale (February 23, 1926 – May 5, 1998) was an American educator, entrepreneur, and activist in the Civil Rights Movement in the Phoenix area. In 2023, Ragsdale was inducted into the Arizona Women's Hall of Fame.

== Early life ==
Eleanor Dickey was born February 23, 1926 in Collingdale, Pennsylvania. She completed high school in Darby, Pennsylvania, and enrolled at Cheyney University of Pennsylvania, where she graduated in 1947 with a degree in education.

Shortly after graduating, Dickey relocated to Phoenix, Arizona to accept a position as a kindergarten teacher at Dunbar Elementary School. She met Lincoln Ragsdale through her cousin. They married on May 29, 1949. Lincoln became her partner in entrepreneurship and activism in Phoenix's segregated communities.

== Civil Rights era activism ==
=== Organizations ===
Ragsdale was an active member of community organizations and became a charter member of the local National Association for the Advancement of Colored People (NAACP), Phoenix Urban League, and Greater Phoenix Council for Civic Unity (GPCCU). She also served as a member of Delta Sigma Theta, The Links, Incorporated and clubs and associations advocating women's rights. Ragsdale negotiated political partnerships for black churches, women's clubs, and voluntary associations. Through her membership and affiliation with these groups, she helped raise funds to support desegregation litigation.

=== Desegregation ===
In 1953, Ragsdale resigned as a teacher to help manage the family mortuary and investment company. She earned her insurance license to help lead the Ragsdale Realty and Insurance Agency. Her work as a realtor led to the desegregation of the Encanto-Palm Croft neighborhood. A restrictive covenant prevented African Americans from moving into the neighborhood. As Ragsdale was lightskinned, she was able to enter and view the home to choose it. When she was unable to purchase it, she had a white friend purchase the house and transfer the title to her while the house was still in escrow. However, while she was able to find a way to purchase the house, neighbors remained prejudiced against the Ragsdale family. The Ragsdale home was vandalized and terrorized with threatening phone calls, and Lincoln was harassed by the community police.

Ragsdale went on to repeat the process that allowed her family to purchase their Encanto District home for other black families. As a former teacher, Ragsdale was concerned with black teachers' inability to find affordable housing. Her real estate work made it possible for many to move from tiny apartments into their own homes.

The Ragsdales were also instrumental in the desegregation of the Arizona public schools. They worked with the GPCCU and other Civil Rights groups to lobby the legislature in order to give schools the option to voluntarily desegregate. When Phoenix schools did not desegregate, the Ragsdales pressured the Arizona court system into outlawing segregation in schools, and Eleanor was present when Fred C. Struckmeyer Jr. declared racial segregation in schools unconstitutional in Phillips vs. Phoenix Union High Schools and Junior College District.

In 1962, Ragsdale's brother, William Dickey, noted that two Phoenix stores were particularly hostile to Black people. In response, the Ragsdales led over one hundred black Phoenicians in a protest match on January 27, 1962 to protest Woolworth's discriminatory practices.

Later that year, Eleanor helped lead the call for legislation prohibiting discrimination in places of public accommodation. She wrote to and met with law makers, raised money to support the NAACP, PUL, and GPCCU, and picketed.

=== Collaboration with the Mexican American community ===
In the 1960s Ragsdale collaborated with Grace Gill-Olivarez to desegregate schools and to promote better educational opportunities for Mexican American, African American, and other minority students. "Eleanor Ragsdale helped Gill-Olivarez solicit funds to defray the costs for a number of Mexican American high school students to attend evening job-training workshops, and she also worked with administrators at ASU to establish financial aid programs for both incoming African American and Mexican American students". Yet, even as Ragsdale and her colleagues won a victory in desegregating Phoenix schools in 1953, enrollment of white students in these schools dropped, leaving minority students in underfunded, poorly administered schools which created new racial tensions between the African American and Mexican American communities. Despite Ragsdale's efforts, no unified coalition was able to form.

== Personal life ==
Between 1951 and 1957, the Ragsdales had four children, three girls and a boy.

In 1972, Eleanor survived a near-fatal accident, almost losing her left eye. Following the accident, the Ragsdales became world travelers, visiting Iran, China, and other parts of the Middle East and Asia.

After Lincoln died, Eleanor continued to work for family interests and racial inclusion. She died on May 5, 1998.

== Sources ==
- Whitaker, Matthew C. (2003). "'Creative Conflict': Lincoln and Eleanor Ragsdale, Collaboration, and Community Activism in Phoenix, 1953-1965". Western Historical Quarterly. 34 (2): 165–190. doi:10.2307/25047255. ISSN 0043-3810. JSTOR 25047255.
- Whitaker, Matthew C. (2005). Race Work. Lincoln, Nebraska: University of Nebraska Press. ISBN 9780803248212.
