= James Harkness (mathematician) =

Canadian mathematician

James Harkness FRSC (1864–1923) was a Canadian mathematician, born in Derby, England, and educated at Trinity College, Cambridge with a B.A. in 1885 and an M.A. in 1889. Coming early to the United States, he was connected with Bryn Mawr College from 1888 to 1903, for the last seven years as professor of mathematics.

The study of the Theory of Functions received a new impetus in America through the arrival of James Harkness (1864–1923), a man who from his boyhood had shown unusual ability in the field of mathematics. At the age of eight he mastered the first book of Euclid's Elements without any help. He studied under Dr. E. J. Routh at Trinity College, Cambridge, graduating as eighth wrangler in 1885.

Harkness complemented Scott with a course on "Abelian Integrals and Functions" that also drew on the latest literature in German — the work of Alfred Clebsch and Paul Gordan, Bernhard Riemann, Hermann Amandus Schwarz and others — and "aimed to prepare the students for the recent Memoirs of Felix Klein in the Mathematische Annalen".

In 1903, he was appointed Peter Redpath professor of pure mathematics at McGill University, Montreal, Quebec.

Harkness was for a time a vice president of the American Mathematical Society and associate editor of its Transactions, was elected a member of the London Mathematical Society and in 1908 became a fellow of the Royal Society of Canada. He published, with Professor Frank Morley, two treatises on the Theory of Functions and collaborated on the article "Elliptic Functions", in the German Encyclopædia of Mathematics (1914–15).
