= Frances Lowater =

British-American physicist and astronomer

Frances Lowater (1871–1956) was a British-American physicist and astronomer. Lowater's spectrographic research examined Mira, R Leonis, R Serpentis, and T Cephei and studied the absorption spectra of sulfur dioxide. Her research was conducted at the Yerkes Observatory. She taught at Wellesley College for most of her career. She was a fellow of both the Royal Astronomical Society and the London Physical Society, and helped write the third volume of the Physical Society's Report on Progress in Physics with Wilfrid Basil Mann. Lowater was also elected a member of the Royal Institution.

== Life and career ==
Lowater was born in Stoke-sub-Hamdon in Somerset, England. Lowater studied in England for her undergraduate degrees, at University College, Nottingham, and Newnham College, Cambridge. She graduated from Newnham in 1892, and then moved to the United States, where she attended Bryn Mawr College and earned her Ph.D. in 1906. While studying for her Ph.D., she took a position as a physics demonstrator, and remained in that position until 1910. Lowater spent a year at Westfield College and four years at Rockford College, then moved to Wellesley College, where she spent the rest of her career; with the exception of a year teaching at the Western College for Women, from 1910 to 1911.

Lowater's spectrographic research examined Mira, R Leonis, R Serpentis, and T Cephei and studied the absorption spectra of sulfur dioxide. Her research was conducted at the Yerkes Observatory, where she was a research assistant during the summers. She was a fellow of both the Royal Astronomical Society and the London Physical Society, and helped write the third volume of the Physical Society's Report on Progress in Physics with Wilfrid Basil Mann; she was also elected a member of the Royal Institution. Lowater died in 1956.

== See also ==
- List of astronomers
