= Louise Holland =

American philologist and academic (1893-1990)

- Louise Adams Holland in later life
- Born: Louise Elizabeth Whetenhall Adams; July 3, 1893; Brooklyn, New York City, US
- Died: June 21, 1990 (aged 96); Philadelphia, Pennsylvania
- Occupations: philologist, university academic, and archaeologist
- Known for: Roman classic studies
- Spouse: Leicester Bodine Holland
- Relatives: Léonie Adams (sister)

Academic background
- Education: Barnard College; Columbia University; Bryn Mawr College
- Thesis: A Study in the Commerce of Latium from the Early Iron Age through the Sixth Century (1920)
- Doctoral advisor: Tenney Frank

Academic work
- Institutions: Smith College; Vassar College; Bryn Mawr College; Haverford College; Miami University
- Notable works: The Faliscans in Prehistoric Times (1925); Janus and the Bridge (1961); Lucretius and the Transpadanes (1979)

Louise Adams Holland (3 July 1893 – 21 June 1990) was a philologist, professor, academic, and archaeologist. Specializing in classic Roman studies, Holland is best known for her work as a professor at various universities, including Bryn Mawr College, Vassar College, and Smith College. Holland earned numerous honors for her career in academia, including an honorary doctorate from Smith College, the Distinguished Alumna Award from Barnard College, and Doctor of Letters from Columbia University.

== Early life and education ==
Holland was born on 3 July 1893 in Brooklyn in New York State (it would not become part of New York City until five years later). Born Louise Elizabeth Whetenhall Adams, she was the third child and first daughter of six children of Henrietta (née Rozier) and Charles Frederick Adams, a lawyer. Her younger sister was the United States Poet Laureate Léonie Adams. Louise Holland graduated from Barnard College in 1914 having specialised in Greek, and was awarded her M. A. from Columbia University and her Ph.D. from Bryn Mawr College in 1920, where she studied Latin. She studied at the American Academy in Rome from 1916 to 1917 as a Bryn Mawr Special Travelling Fellow and it was here that she developed an interest in topography.

== Career ==
Holland in her younger years

In 1918, Holland became an Instructor in Latin at Smith College and, in 1921, she became assistant professor of Latin there. She married the archaeologist Leicester Bodine Holland (1882-1952) in Philadelphia in 1923 and their daughter Barbara Adams Holland was born in 1925. Her book The Faliscans in Prehistoric Times was published in Rome in 1925. The couple both taught at Vassar College — she lecturing in Latin and he in Art History. A second daughter, Marian Rupert Holland, was born in 1927 and Leicester Holland was appointed as Chief of the Division of Fine Arts at the Library of Congress while Louise taught at Bryn Mawr. Their son Lawrence Rozier Holland was born in 1930.

During World War II, Holland did war work for Midvale Steel, returning to teach at Bryn Mawr College after the war. From 1948 to 1949 she was the recipient of a Guggenheim Fellowship and from then on taught at Haverford College before moving to teach at Miami University in 1952. Her husband died in 1952, and in 1957, she returned to Smith College. She remained there until her retirement in 1964 (excluding a period from 1959 to 1960 when she was a resident scholar at the American Academy in Rome).

After leaving Smith College, Holland was awarded numerous honors including an honorary doctorate from Smith College in 1965, the Distinguished Alumna Award from Barnard College in 1978, and Doctor of Letters from Columbia University in 1979. During this period she published Janus and the Bridge (1961) and Lucretius and the Transpadanes (1979).

== Later life ==
In her later years, Holland suffered from macular degeneration and became blind. She suffered a stroke in 1985 and while recovered physically, her memory began to fail. She remained as a resident in a convalescent home in Philadelphia until her death in 1990, just short of her 97th birthday.
