= Stotham =

Fictional town in Massachusetts, United States

Stotham is a fictional town in Massachusetts, United States which was invented by architect Hubert G. Ripley (1869–1942) of the firm Ripley and LeBoutillier in an article he wrote for the April 1920 issue (vol. VI, No. 2) of the White Pine Series of Architectural Monographs as the purported locale of a number of photographs of New England structures which had been edited out of earlier location-specific issues of the bi-monthly series.

Ripley's article about the town was printed under an epigram from Thomas Gray's "Elegy Written in a Country Churchyard":

Far from the madding crowd's ignoble strife,

Their sober wishes never learn'd to stray;
Along the cool sequester'd vale of life

They kept the noiseless tenor of their way.

The introduction presented a description of the character and history of Stotham invented by Ripley. According to his introduction, "When Zabdiel Podbury fled from Stoke-on-Tritham in the Spring of 1689 with Drusilla Ives, taking passage on the bark Promise, sailing for Massachusetts Bay, it was not realized at the time that, from this union, and the joint labors of the Penthesilean pair, the village of Stotham (so named by them in memory of their autochthonous abode) would in later days come to be regarded as a typical example, although, perhaps, not so well known, of the unspoiled New England Village."

Some of the town's buildings were credited to fictional "town architect" Ruben Duren. The "Rogers Mansion" was given a legend of buried treasure and a ghost.

The fiction was uncovered by catalogers at the Library of Congress in the 1940s. Department head Leicester Bodine Holland asked Russell B. Whitehead, editor of the White Pine series, about the mysterious town, eliciting a full explanation. The matter was explored in a 1964 article in the Journal of the Society of Architectural Historians and explained in the 1987 reprinting of the monographs as The Architectural Treasures of Early America.

== Edifices shown ==
Only a few of the edifices described in the "Stotham" monograph have been positively identified. The "House on Sandy Point" is actually the Joseph Lynde House in Melrose, Massachusetts. The "Salmon White House" is actually the Abram Mitchell House in Chester, Connecticut. The "Podbury-Ives House" is an unnamed house from Bedford, Massachusetts. The "Heman Billings House" is, in truth, the Champion House of East Haddam, Connecticut. The "Uriel Underwood House" is the Wheeler House in Oxford, New Hampshire. and the "First Meeting House of the Stotham Congregational Society" is, in fact, the North Congregational Church of Woodbury, Connecticut.
