= Ruth Gentry =

American mathematician

Ruth Gentry (February 22, 1862 – October 18, 1917) was a pioneering American woman mathematician during the late 19th century and the beginning of the 20th century. She was the first Indiana-born woman to acquire a PhD degree in mathematics, and most likely the first woman born in Indiana to receive a doctoral degree in any scientific discipline.

== Early years and education ==
Ruth Ellen Gentry was the youngest of three children born to Jeremiah Gentry (1827–1906) and Lucretia (Wilcox) Gentry (1830–1909). Jeremiah was a farmer and stock trader who moved to Hendricks County, Indiana from Bullitt County, Kentucky, when he was five years old, and remained there the rest of his life. Ruth and her siblings, Oliver (1853–1878) and Mary Frances (1860–1929), were born and grew up on the family farm near Stilesville, Indiana. Ruth's early education took place there as well.

Gentry attended Indiana State Normal School, a teachers' college that had opened in 1870 but did not yet award bachelor's degrees. After graduating in 1880, she taught at preparatory schools for ten years. In 1885, she decided to get her bachelor's degree at the University of Michigan—at that time one the few American colleges to admit women as undergraduates. She studied mathematics for a year and then went back to teaching school, moving to Florida for the years 1886–88 to teach at DeLand Academy and College (which changed its name while she was there to DeLand University).

Gentry did her graduate work starting in 1890 at Bryn Mawr College, which at that time was one of the only institutions of higher education in the country to admit women for graduate studies. In 1891 she was a Fellow in Mathematics at Bryn Mawr. Following her first year, she was awarded the Association of College Alumnae European Fellowship, becoming the first mathematician and second recipient of the honor. She used the fellowship to study in Europe in 1891–92. Gentry went first to Germany in the hope of being allowed to sit in on lectures by German mathematicians at one of the country's universities (which at the time did not admit women). After she had been turned down by numerous professors, Lazarus Fuchs of the University of Berlin secured permission for her to attend lectures by himself and Ludwig Schlesinger. This arrangement lasted only one semester before being revoked by university administrators. She remained in Europe for an additional semester, attending lectures in mathematics at the Sorbonne in Paris.

Upon her return to Bryn Mawr, Gentry was appointed a fellow in mathematics for 1892–93, after which she stayed on another year as a fellow by courtesy of the school. She became Charlotte Scott's first graduate student, and in 1894 she finished her doctoral work at Bryn Mawr. Her thesis, On the Forms of Plane Quartic Curves, was not published until 1896, which is why she is sometimes described as one of Scott's first two students, along with Isabel Maddison.

== Career ==
After earning her PhD, Gentry taught at Vassar College, becoming the first person on the mathematics faculty at Vassar to hold a doctoral degree. In 1900 she was made associate professor.

Two years later, suffering from health issues, Gentry left Vassar to become the associate principal and head of the mathematics department at Miss Gleim's, a private school in Pittsburgh, Pennsylvania. In 1905 she left this position and became a volunteer nurse. She traveled in the United States and Europe for a time, but suffered from further health problems. Her illness progressed until she died of breast cancer in Indianapolis, Indiana at the age of 55 on October 18, 1917. She is buried in Stilesville Cemetery in Stilesville, Indiana.

== Mathematical interests ==
Gentry's main interest was in geometry, especially the study of quartic curves, which was the content of her thesis.

== Honors ==
In 1894, while still at Bryn Mawr, Gentry became a member of the New York Mathematical Society, which later became the American Mathematical Society.
