= White Pine Series of Architectural Monographs =

Architectural monograph of Early American architecture

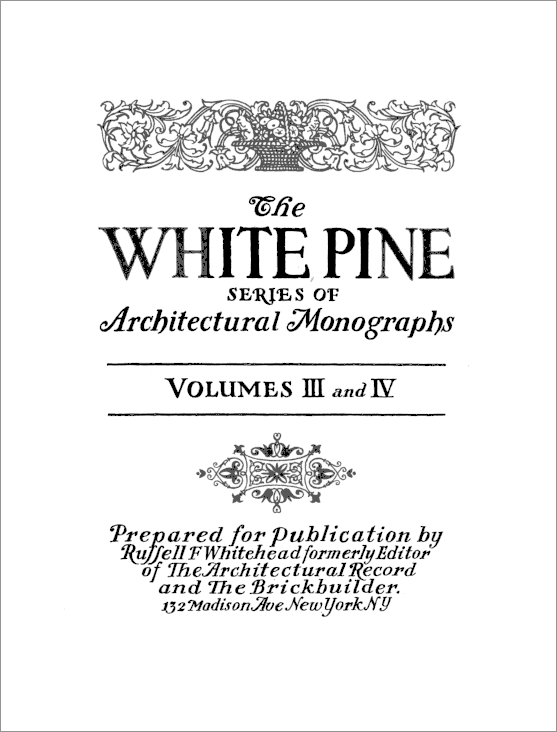
Frontispiece for the 1918 publication of Volumes III and IV in the series

The White Pine Series of Architectural Monographs, subtitled "A Bi-Monthly Publication Suggesting the Architectural Use of White Pine and Its Availability Today as a Structural Wood", was a landmark publication of drawings, photographs and descriptions of early American architecture.

The original series was first published in 1915. In 1931, after changing titles twice, publication as a stand alone series was ceased. In 1932, it merged with another architectural journal entitled "Pencil Points" where it remained until December 1940; it was revived from 2006 to 2014. Both the original series and revival were discovered to have published content based on fabricated New England communities.

== History ==
The series was launched in 1915 as an advertising campaign by the White Pine Bureau, a joint venture of the Northern Pine Manufacturer's Association of Minnesota, Wisconsin and Michigan and the Associated White Pine Manufacturers of Idaho. Architect Russell F. Whitehead was hired to supervise the series with Julian Buckly as photographer.

During the first 10 years, the series was limited to the exterior details of residences constructed with Eastern white pine, as suited its advertising purpose. Often the notable structures of a single village would be documented together in one issue. By 1920, the editor's collection of unpublished photographs became so extensive that Whitehead and his colleague Hubert Ripley invented the fictional town of Stotham, Massachusetts, to justify their use. The fiction went undiscovered until the late 1940s when Leicester Bodine Holland, head of the Library of Congress' Department of Fine Arts related his inability to locate the town to Whitehead, eliciting an explanation of the subterfuge.

In 1924, the White Pine Bureau ceased its advertising campaign and Whitehead determined to continue the series independently, selling advertising space to Weyerhauser Forest Products. He also modified the focus of the series, including documentation of churches and public buildings, the recording of interiors and millwork details, and expanded the geographic scope of the project, documenting buildings in the southern states, many of which had been framed with Southern pine or Cypress.

In 1932, the Monograph series became absorbed into the Pencil Points architectural journal as a regular feature. The documentation of historic structures with photographs and measured drawings complemented the "Comparative Details" feature which published construction details for contemporary projects. The Monograph series ended abruptly at the end of 1940, and its last publication in Pencil Points was the December issue, volume XXVI number 6. Many of its contributors became involved in the Historic American Buildings Survey.

=== Re-issue and revival ===
Eagerly collected by architects and historians, the monographs have been re-issued in bound editions several times. In 1987, the National Historical Society of Harrisburg, Pennsylvania, began publishing a series of hardbound books, the Architectural Treasures of Early America, drawn entirely from the White Pine Monographs. They reorganized the individual editions into geographic regions and re-set all the type in order to produce a consistent presentation. They were also able, in many cases, to make use of the original photographs which had been given to Weyerhauser by Whitehead's widow.

In 2006, the Northeastern Lumber Manufacturers Association (NELMA) revived the title for a new series of publications documenting the production and use of eastern white pine lumber in construction.

In 2011, another hoax was discovered; similar to the 1920s hoax about Stotham, Massachusetts, a 2010 monograph discussing the town of New Milford, New Hampshire, was found to have been a fabrication. The article described the community as being a flourishing Victorian-era village in the White Mountains during the early 20th century. According to the article, New Milford had been incorporated in 1852 by working-class quarry workers, had enjoyed prosperity for many years, and then declined in the early 20th century, following a succession of unfortunate disasters at the quarry site, the decline of rail-based tourism, the Great Depression, and the outbreak of World Wars. Research by the Milford, New Hampshire, Historical Society and the New Hampshire State Library following the publication of the article led to the discovery that the article was fictitious.

The series has not been published since 2014.

== Sources ==
- Magruder, C. (March 1963). "The White Pine Monograph Series". The Journal of the Society of Architectural Historians. 22 (1): 39–41. doi:10.2307/988213. JSTOR 988213.
- Davis, William C. (1987) "Historical Introduction to the Series." Survey of Early American Design, Vol. 1 of Lisa C. Mullins, ed., Architectural Treasures of Early America. Harrisburg, Pennsylvania. pp. 5–7
