= Bryn Mawr College =

Private women's college in Pennsylvania, US

- Motto: Veritatem Dilexi (Latin)
- Motto in English: I Delight in the Truth
- Type: Private women's liberal arts college
- Established: 1885; 141 years ago
- Religious affiliation: None, formerly Quaker
- Academic affiliations: Annapolis Group; CLAC; COFHE; Oberlin Group; Seven Sisters; WCC
- Endowment: $1.34 billion (2025)
- President: Wendy Cadge
- Provost: Airea Matthews
- Faculty: 160 full-time, 41 part-time (2019)
- Students: 1,677 (fall 2023)
- Undergraduates: 1,360 (fall 2023)
- Postgraduates: 317 (fall 2023)
- Location: Bryn Mawr; Lower Merion Twp, Pennsylvania, United States
- Campus: Suburban, 135 acres (55 ha)
- Colors: Lantern’s Glow and white
- Sporting affiliations: NCAA Division III – Centennial Conference
- Mascot: Owl
- Website: brynmawr.edu
- Bryn Mawr College Historic District
- U.S. National Register of Historic Places
- U.S. Historic district
- Location within Pennsylvania Location within the United States
- Location: Morris Ave., Yarrow St. and New Gulph Rd., Bryn Mawr, Pennsylvania
- Coordinates: 40°1′35″N 75°18′49″W
- Area: 49 acres (20 ha)
- Built: 1885
- Architect: Multiple
- Architectural style: Late Gothic Revival, Gothic, Collegiate Gothic
- NRHP reference No.: 79002299
- Added to NRHP: May 4, 1979

Bryn Mawr College (/brɪn ˈmɑːr/ brin MAR, Welsh: [brɨn ˈmaur]) is a private women's liberal arts college in Bryn Mawr, Pennsylvania, United States. Founded as a Quaker institution in 1885, Bryn Mawr is one of the Seven Sister colleges, a group of historically women's colleges in the United States. The college has an enrollment of about 1,350 undergraduate students and 450 graduate students. It was one of the first women's colleges in the United States to offer graduate education through a PhD.

== History ==
Bryn Mawr College is a private women's liberal arts college founded in 1885. The Graduate School is co-educational. The name "bryn mawr" is Welsh for big hill. (Note: Not 'high hill', as is often mistakenly given as the translation; "high hill" would be Bryn Uchel in Welsh.) It is named after the town of Bryn Mawr, in which the campus is located. The town of Bryn Mawr had previously been named Humphreysville, after the Humphreys family who had bought the land in 1683. The town was renamed Bryn Mawr in the mid-nineteenth century by the Pennsylvania Railroad Corporation. Bryn Mawr had been the name of an estate granted to Rowland Ellis by William Penn in the 1680s. Ellis named it after his former home, a house near Dolgellau, Merioneth, Wales. The college was largely funded through the bequest of Joseph W. Taylor, and its first president was James Rhoads. Bryn Mawr was one of the first institutions of higher education in the United States to offer graduate degrees, including doctorates, to women. The first class included 36 undergraduate women and eight graduate students. Bryn Mawr was originally affiliated with the Quakers (Religious Society of Friends), but by 1893 had become non-denominational.

In 1912, Bryn Mawr became the first college in the United States to offer doctorates in social work, through the Department of Social Economy and Social Research. This department became the Graduate School of Social Work and Social Research in 1970. In 1931, Bryn Mawr began accepting men as graduate students, while remaining women-focused at the undergraduate level.

From 1921 to 1938 the Bryn Mawr campus was home to the Bryn Mawr Summer School for Women Workers in Industry, which was founded as part of the labor education movement and the women's labor movement. The school taught political economy, science, and literature.

The college celebrated its 125th anniversary of "bold vision, for women, for the world" during the 2010–2011 academic year. In September 2010, Bryn Mawr hosted an international conference on issues of educational access, equity, and opportunity in secondary schools and universities in the United States and around the world. Other festivities held for the anniversary year included publication of a commemorative book on 125 years of student life, and, in partnership with the Philadelphia Mural Arts Program, the creation of a mural in West Philadelphia highlighting advances in women's education.

=== Transgender students ===
On February 9, 2015, the college's board of trustees announced approval of a working group recommendation to expand the undergraduate applicant pool allowing transgender women and intersex individuals identifying as women to apply for admission. This decision made Bryn Mawr the fourth women's college in the United States to accept trans women. Bryn Mawr "recognizes that gender is fluid and that traditional notions of gender identity and expression can be limiting", and has the official policy of accepting nonbinary students who were assigned female at birth as well. All current, past, and future students are fully recognized as members of the Bryn Mawr community, regardless of current gender identity.

== Campus ==
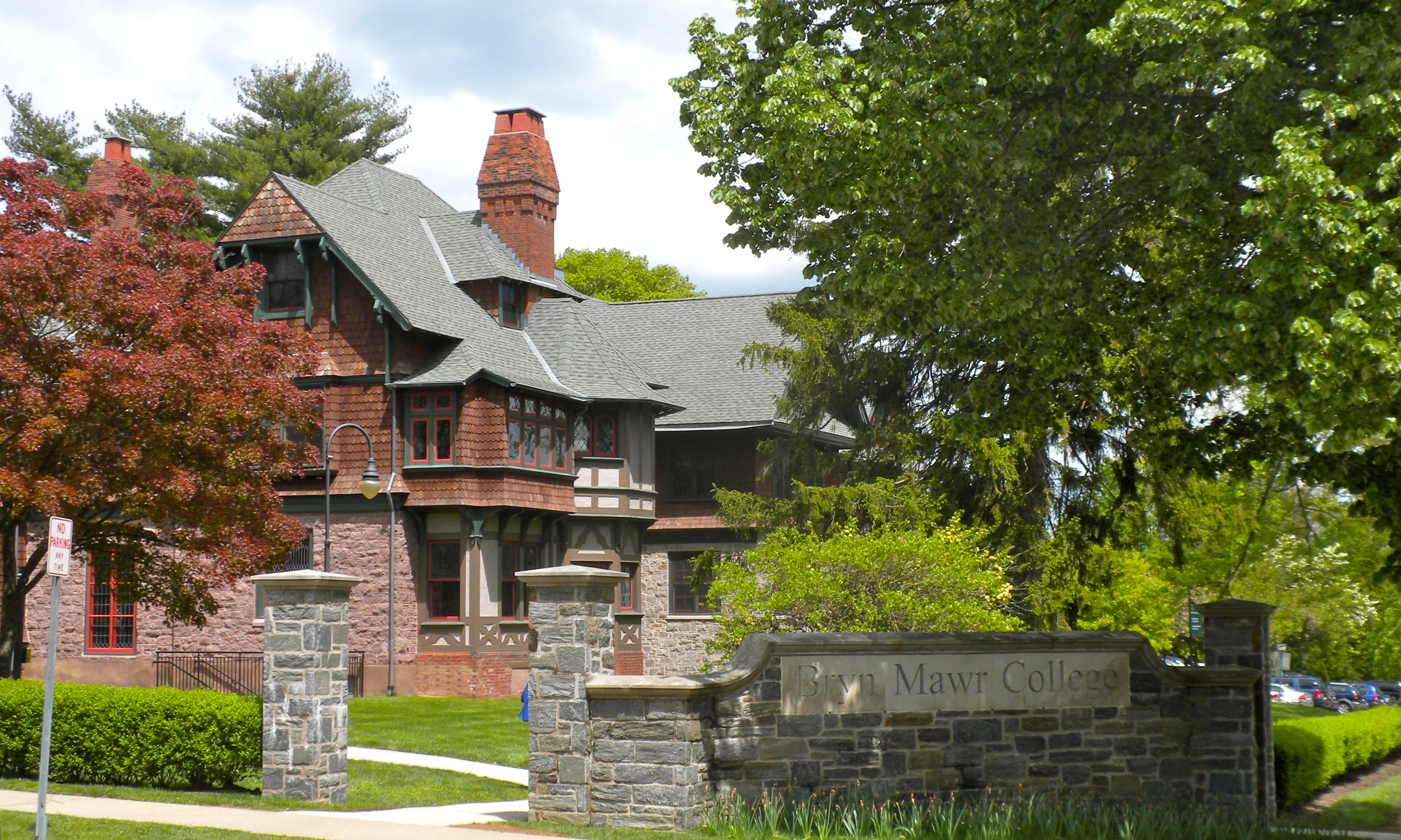
Campus entrance

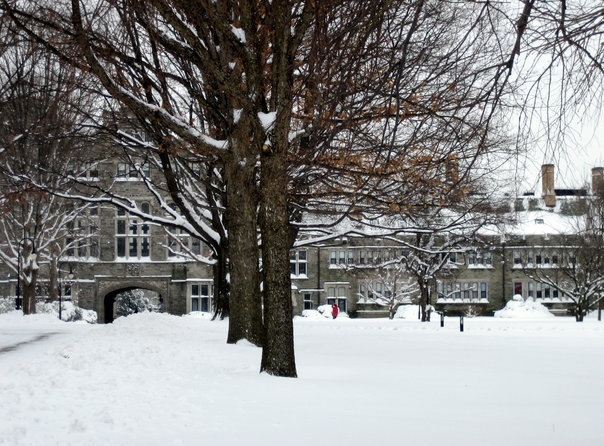
Bryn Mawr's Pembroke Arch

The campus is in the municipality of Lower Merion Township. Most of the campus is in the Bryn Mawr census-designated place.

The campus was designed in part by noted landscape designers Calvert Vaux and Frederick Law Olmsted, and has subsequently been designated an arboretum (the Bryn Mawr Campus Arboretum).

=== Student residences ===
The majority of Bryn Mawr students live on campus in residence halls. Many of the older residence halls were designed by Cope & Stewardson (same architects who designed a large part of the University of Pennsylvania, Washington University in St. Louis, and Princeton University campuses) and are known for their Collegiate Gothic architecture, modeled after Cambridge University. Each is named after a county town in Wales: Brecon, Denbigh (1891), Merion (1885), and Radnor (1887), and Pembroke East and West (1892). Rhoads North and South was named after the college's first president, James E. Rhoads; Rockefeller is named after its donor, John D. Rockefeller. Erdman was opened in 1965, designed by architect Louis Kahn. In addition, students may choose to live in Batten House (an environmentally friendly co-op). Perry House, which was originally established as the Spanish language house in 1962, was redefined as the Black Cultural Center in the 1970s. In 2015, Perry House was relaunched by the college in the former French tower of Haffner, which had undergone renovations and reconstruction the previous year. Along with Perry, now known as the Enid Cook '31 Center, a new residence hall was built where the old Haffner Language and Culture House once stood.

Glenmede (formerly graduate student housing) is an estate located about a half mile from the main campus which at one point was available housing for undergraduate students. In 2007, it was sold to a conservation buyer as the annual costs of upkeep were too great for the college.

=== Blanca Noel Taft Memorial Garden ===
In 1908, John C. Olmsted designed a private garden for M. Carey Thomas adjoining the Deanery. The garden was later modified and renamed as the Blanca Noel Taft Memorial Garden. In its current form, the garden is a small enclosure with two wall fountains, one with a small basin and the other with a sunken reflecting pool. The decorative wall tiles above the smaller wall fountain and basin were purchased from Syria.

=== Erdman Hall dormitory ===
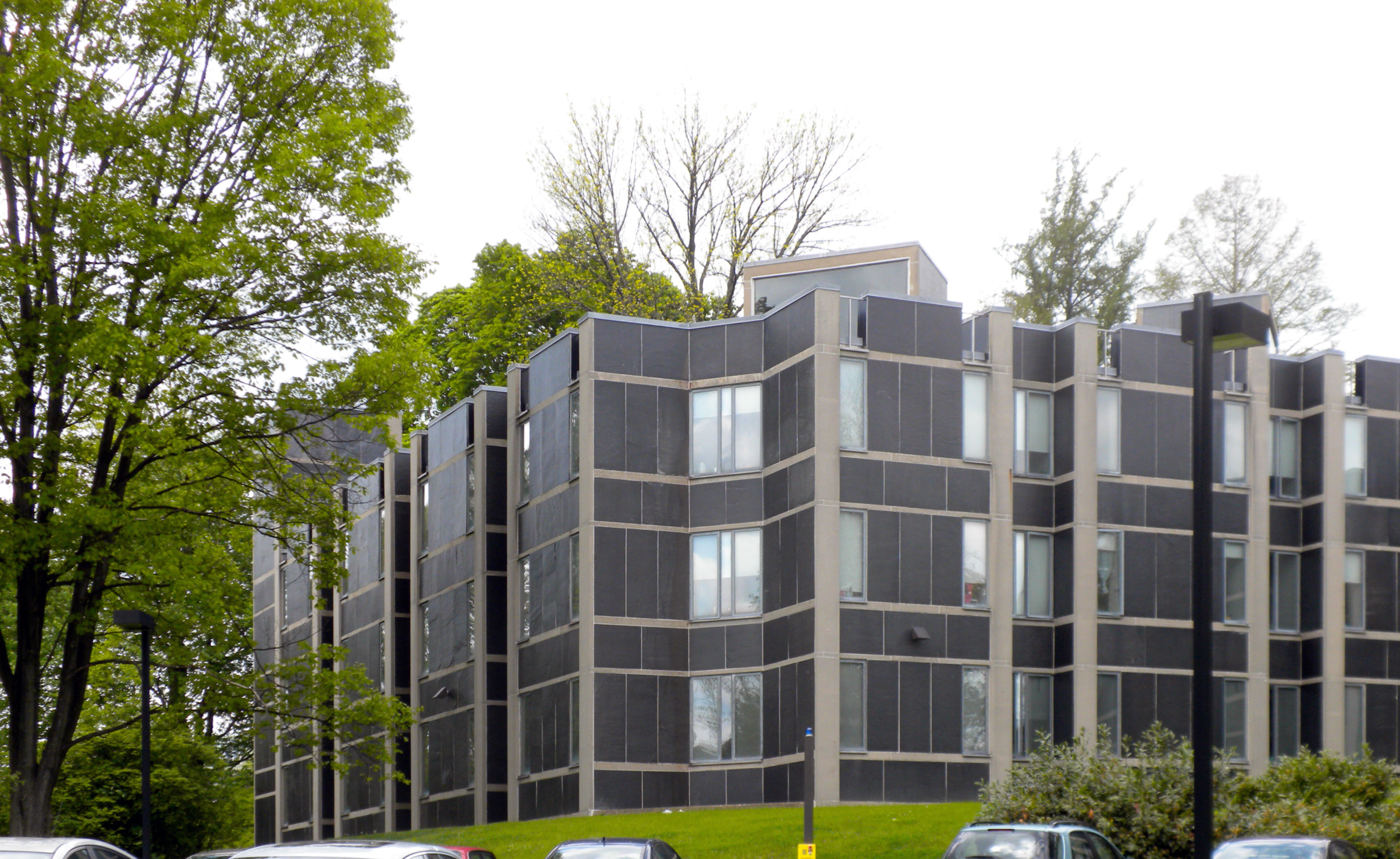
Erdman Hall

In 1960, architect Louis I. Kahn and Bryn Mawr College president, Katharine Elizabeth McBride, came together to create the Erdman Hall dormitory.

=== Marjorie Walter Goodhart Theater ===
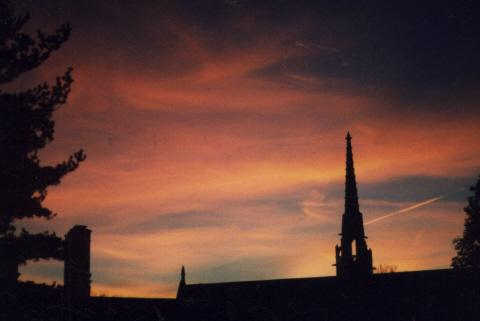
Sunset over Goodhart Hall

The Marjorie Walter Goodhart Theater houses a vaulted auditorium designed by Arthur Ingersoll Meigs of Mellor, Meigs & Howe, two smaller spaces that are ideal for intimate performances by visiting artists, practice rooms for student musicians, and the Office for the Arts. The building's towers and gables, friezes, carvings and ornamental ironwork, designed by Samuel Yellin, were done in the gothic revival style. In the fall of 2009, the college completed a renovation of Goodhart.

=== Old Library (previously M. Carey Thomas Library and College Hall) ===
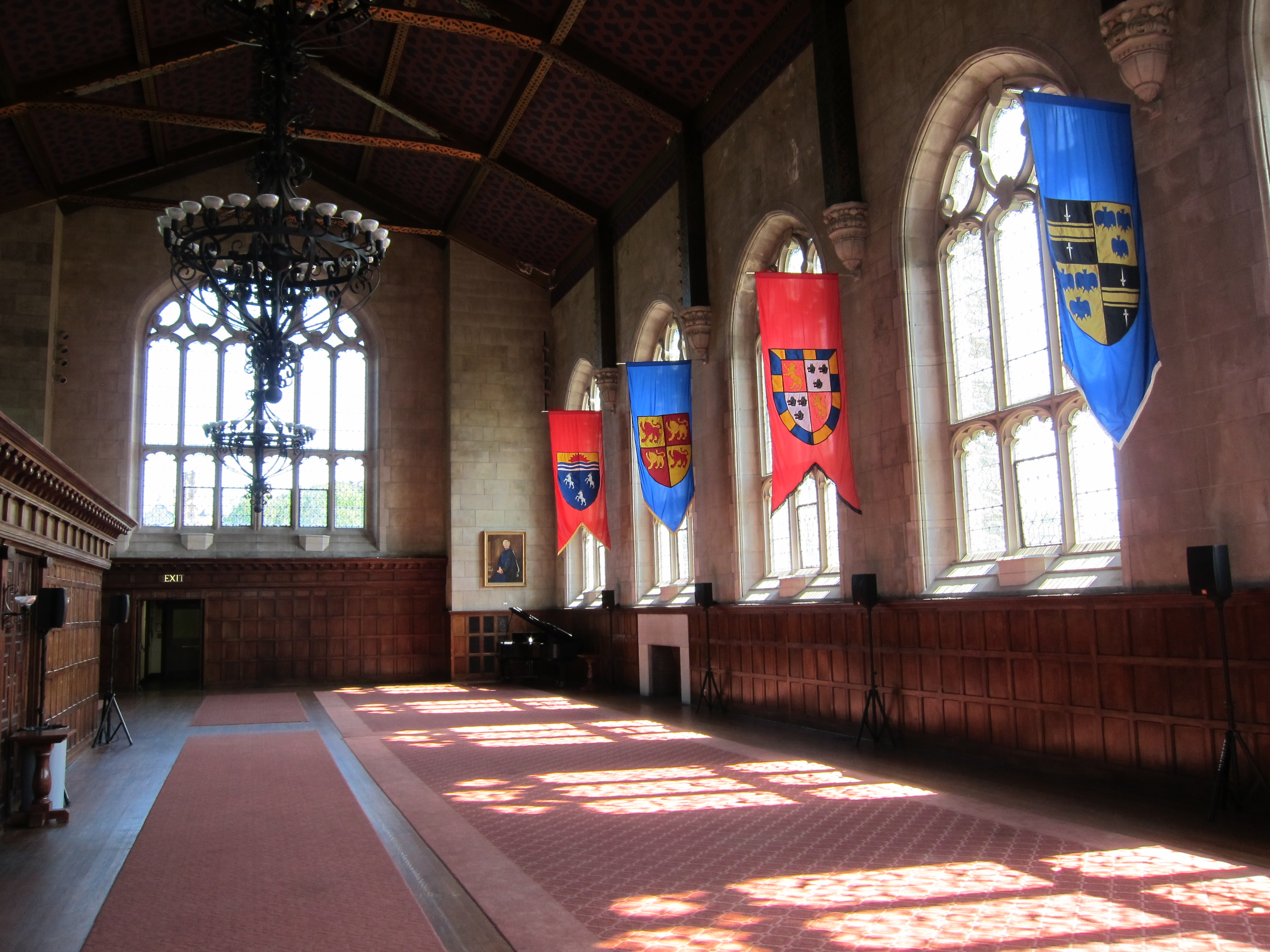
Interior of the Great Hall

Previously named after Bryn Mawr's first Dean and second president, Old Library was used as the primary campus library until 1970, when Mariam Coffin Canaday Library opened. The Great Hall (formerly the reading room of the library) was designed by Walter Cope (of Cope and Stewardson) in 1901 and built by Stewardson and Jamieson several years later, although M. Carey Thomas played a large part in its construction. Today, it is a space for performances, readings, lectures, and public gatherings. Old Library encloses a large open courtyard called "The Cloisters". The cremated remains of M. Carey Thomas and Emmy Noether are located in the Cloisters. Georgiana Goddard King is also buried in the cloister. The building was declared a National Historic Landmark in 1991. The Great Hall was once the home of an Athena Lemnia statue (damaged in 1997) that is now located in a high alcove in the Rhys Carpenter Art and Archaeology Library. A plaster cast of that Athena now stands in her place at the Great Hall. Students often leave offerings to this statue in the hope that she will intervene on their behalf. In 2018, the board of trustees formalized the use of the name "The Old Library".

Old Library was formerly known as "Thomas Hall" after Bryn Mawr's second president, M. Carey Thomas. The building was informally known as "College Hall" for a year before being officially renamed to "Old Library" in 2018. This renaming was in response to student protests, which claimed that many of M. Carey Thomas's views did not represent the values of the college. Student protesters identified that M. Carey Thomas was a virulent eugenicist, antisemite and racist who strongly opposed the admission of students who were not elite white women. Today, the building houses a plaque explaining the controversy of the former name and affirming the college's current dedication to equity and inclusion, which was unveiled during the 2019 Community Day of Learning.

=== Rhys Carpenter Art and Archaeology Library ===
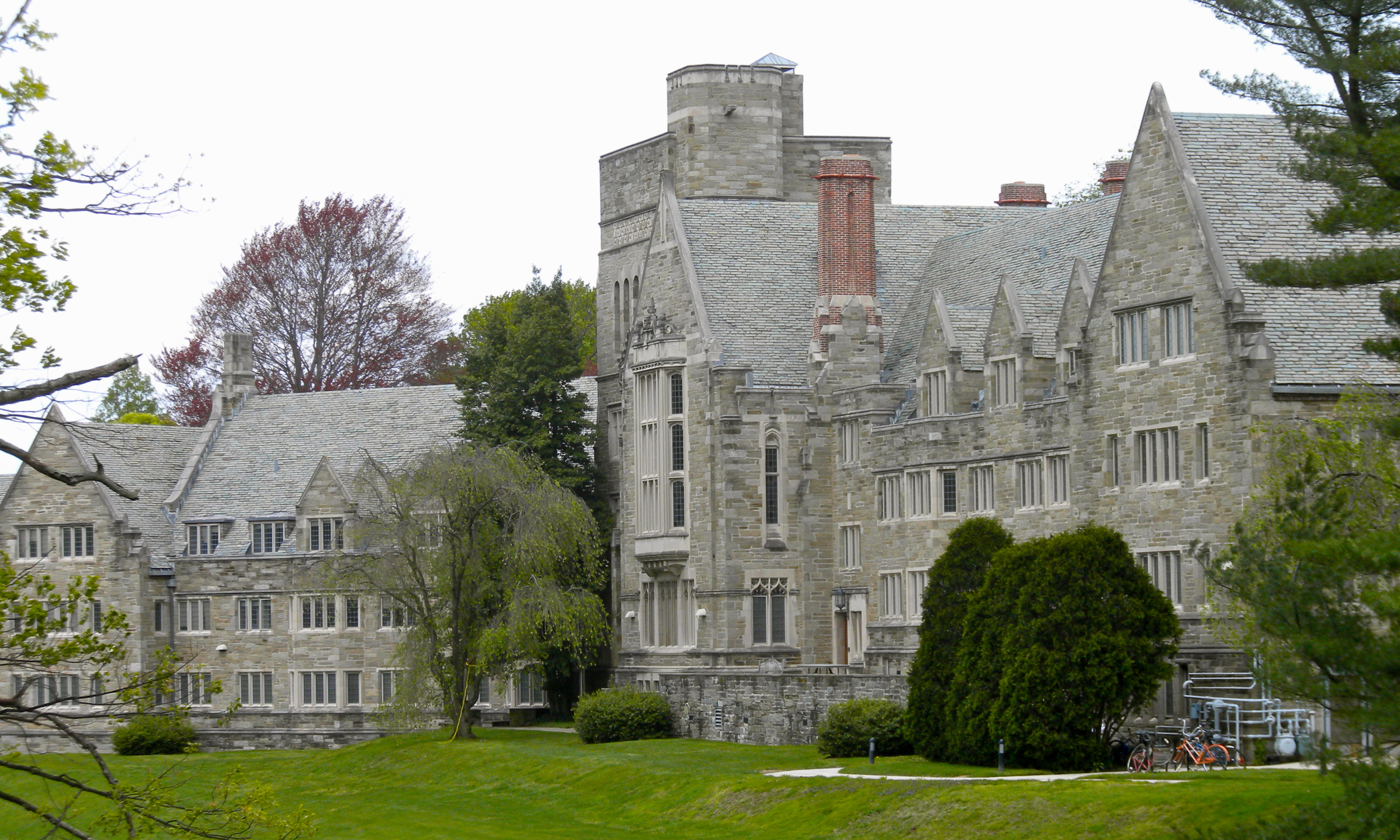
Rhoads Hall

Named for Bryn Mawr's late professor of Classical Archaeology, the Rhys Carpenter Library was designed by Henry Myerberg of New York and opened in 1997. The space is connected to the rear of Old Library. The entrance is a four-story atrium. Names of art and archaeology faculty are displayed on the main wall of the atrium, along with a series of plaster casts of the metopes of the Parthenon. The roof comprises a wide grassy area used for outdoor concerts and picnics. The building won a 2001 Award of Excellence for Library Architecture from the Library Administration and Management Association and the American Institute of Architects. Carpenter Library also houses the college's renowned collections in Classical and Near Eastern Archaeology, History of Art, and Classics.

=== The Deanery ===
The Bryn Mawr College Deanery was the campus residence of the first Dean and second President of Bryn Mawr College, M. Carey Thomas, who maintained a home there from 1885 to 1933. Under the direction of Thomas, the Deanery was gradually enlarged and elaborately decorated with the assistance of the American artist Lockwood de Forest and furnished with art from Thomas' world travels. From 1933 until 1968, the Deanery served as the Alumnae Center and Inn for the college. The building was demolished in the spring of 1968 to make space for the construction of Canaday Library, which stands on the site today. At the time of its demolition, many of the Deanery's furnishings were re-located to Wyndham, an 18th-century farmhouse (with several modern additions) which became the college's new Alumnae Center.

== Academics ==
Academic rankings

Liberal arts
- U.S. News & World Report: 30
- Washington Monthly: 13

National
- Forbes: 180
- WSJ/College Pulse: 68

Bryn Mawr is a small, four year, residential baccalaureate college. Although the college offers several graduate programs, the majority of enrollments are from students enrolled in the undergraduate arts and sciences program.

Students at Bryn Mawr are required to complete divisional requirements in the social sciences, natural sciences (including lab skills) and humanities. In addition, they must complete one year of a foreign language and fulfill a quantitative skills requirement and an Emily Balch Seminar requirement. The Emily Balch Seminars are similar to courses in freshman composition at other institutions, though focus on a specific topic. The seminars stress development of critical thinking skills and are discussion-based, with "intensive reading and writing."

Its most popular undergraduate majors, based on 2021 graduates, were:

- English Language and Literature (31)
- Biology/Biological Sciences (27)
- Psychology (24)
- Mathematics (23)
- Computer Science (22)

In 1972, the college founded a year-long post baccalaureate pre-medical program for career changers. The program remains one of the oldest, most prestigious, and successful in the country — with an over 98% medical school acceptance rate.

Bryn Mawr students can also take classes and major at Haverford College through the Bi-College Consortium. Students can also take classes at Swarthmore College and the University of Pennsylvania through the Tri-College and the Quaker Consortium.

=== Admissions ===
Admissions statistics
- 2025 entering class
- Admit rate: 28.2% (▼ −10)
- Yield rate: 27.4% ( −0.8)

Test scores middle 50%^{[i]}
- SAT Total: 1300–1470
- SAT EBRW: 670–750
- SAT Math: 620–730
- ACT Composite: 29–33

High school GPA^{[ii]}
- Top 10%: 67.0% (▼ −1)
- Top 25%: 93.0% (▲ +8)
- Top 50%: 100.0% (▲ +1)

For the Class of 2023 (enrolling fall 2019), Bryn Mawr received 3,332 applications, admitted 1,102 (30%), and enrolled 374 students. For the freshmen who enrolled, the middle 50% range of SAT scores was 640–740 for evidence-based reading and writing, and 650–770 for math, while the middle 50% ACT composite score range was 29–33.

== Traditions ==
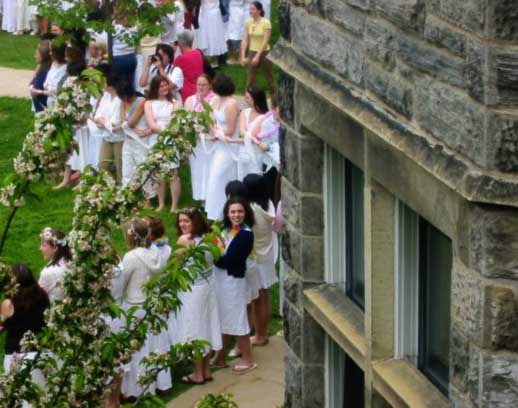
May Day at Bryn Mawr College

Students celebrate four major traditions throughout the year, along with other minor traditions. Parade Night, which happens on the Friday of the first week of classes, is a tradition where the freshman class runs to Taylor Hall, while the upperclassmen throw confetti. Following this, the first of the three "Step Sings" takes place, during which the student body sing various traditional and pop songs. The second is Lantern Night, which takes place in late October or early November, where first year students receive a lantern which symbolizes the passing down of knowledge, during a traditional ceremony with songs in Ancient Greek. Welcome the First Years Week, formerly known as Hell Week, takes place during the early part of the spring semester between February and March. It is a time when students complete silly tasks and attend special events created for them by an upperclassman (called a rose) who the freshman (called a bud) personally selects. May Day is held on the Sunday after the last day of classes, not on the traditional date of May 1. It includes a breakfast of strawberries and cream, a parade, dancing around the traditional Maypole, a feminist alternative called the Mayhole, and student performances. Dar Williams's song "As Cool As I Am" has become part of May Day, as the song is played during the Mayhole celebration. The song is even called an "unofficial anthem" for the school.

The traditions are organized and run by two Traditions Mistexes, elected by the student body. In addition to major traditions, there are a number of minor traditions. These include offerings to a statue of Athena for luck or thanks, using a set of stairs leading up to Taylor Hall called the Senior Steps or down Senior Row, a row of trees in the center of campus unless a student is a senior. The Friendship Poles, a set of two vertical poles located under the main arch of the Pembroke Dorms, are not supposed to be split by a group walking through, or else those who "split the poles" will no longer be friends. Additional traditions and superstitions surround the college campus and its facilities and buildings.

== Sustainability ==
Bryn Mawr has signed the American College and University President's Climate Commitment, and in doing so, the school agreed to make all new buildings comply with a LEED silver standard or higher; to purchase Energy Star products whenever possible; and to provide and encourage the use of public transportation. The school's dining halls strive to be environmentally sustainable by working to expand their local and organic offerings, recycling in all dining areas, and recycling used fry oil as bio-diesel fuel. The dining halls previously offered biodegradable takeout containers, but reverted to Styrofoam in the 2009/10 academic year. Additionally, all leftover food is donated to a local food bank. On the College Sustainability Report Card 2011, published by the Sustainable Endowments Institute, Bryn Mawr received a B+. The school's highest category score was an A in Investment Priorities, since Bryn Mawr invests in renewable energy funds.

== Athletics ==
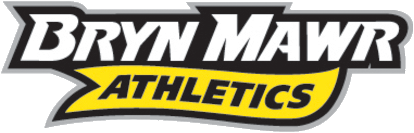
Bryn Mawr Owls wordmark

Bryn Mawr College teams are nicknamed Owls. They play in the Centennial Conference and field intercollegiate teams in badminton, basketball, cross country, field hockey, lacrosse, rowing, soccer, swimming, tennis, indoor and outdoor track and field, and volleyball. The badminton team won national intercollegiate championships in 1996 and 2008. The mascot of the college is the owl, the symbol of Athena, Greek goddess of wisdom.

== Notable alumnae and faculty ==
=== Alumnae ===
A large number of Bryn Mawr alumnae and former attendees are notable in their respective fields. The list includes Drew Gilpin Faust (class of 1968), the first woman president of Harvard University; Hanna Holborn Gray (1950), the first woman president of a major research university (University of Chicago); modernist poets Hilda "H.D." Doolittle (attended), and Marianne Moore (1909); classics scholar Edith Hamilton (M.A. 1894); archaeologist Doreen Canaday Spitzer (1936); author, social activist and feminist Grace Lee Boggs (Ph.D. 1940); Nobel Peace Prize winner Emily Greene Balch (1889); geneticist Nettie Stevens (Ph.D. 1903); physicist Elizabeth Laird (Ph.D. 1901); physicist and astronomer Frances Lowater (Ph.D. 1904); mathematician Ada Isabel Maddison (Ph.D. 1896); Physician Martha Tracy (1898), who was a pioneer in medical education and public health; 1891 Fellow in Mathematics Ruth Gentry; artist Anne Truitt (1943); author Ellen Kushner (attended); economist and founding Director of the Congressional Budget Office Alice Rivlin (1952); four-time Academy Award-winning actress Katharine Hepburn (1928); poet Jane Hess Flanders (1962); nuclear physicist Carol Alonso (1965); former aide to Senate Majority Leader Mitch McConnell and Forbes 30 under 30 honoree Mary Elizabeth Taylor; mayor of Las Vegas from 2011–2024 Carolyn Goodman (1961); mayor of Minneapolis from 2013 to 2017 Betsy Hodges (1991); novelist and journalist Renata Adler (1959); novelist and Booker Prize winner Dame A.S. Byatt; biologist and science fiction novelist Joan Slonczewski (1977); fantasy novelist Caroline Stevermer; author and memoirist Rachel Simon; actor Maggie Siff (1996); and neuroscientist Candace Pert (1970), who helped discover opioid receptors. Other notable alumni include Ana Botín, chair of the Santander Group, one of the world's largest banking groups; indie musician Michelle Zauner (2011), who performs as Japanese Breakfast; the social reformer Alice P. Gannett (1898), for whom the Goodrich-Gannett Neighborhood Center is named; Maya Ajmera, CEO of Society for Science & the Public; the American balloonist, scientist, teacher and priest Jeannette Piccard (1918); and podcaster and comedian Matt McCusker (2020).

=== Faculty ===
Notable faculty include Woodrow Wilson, chemists Arthur C. Cope and Louis Fieser, Arthur Lindo Patterson of the Patterson function, Edmund Beecher Wilson, Geraldine Richmond, philologists Catherine Conybeare, Grace Frank and Louise Holland, archaeologists Brunilde Sismondo Ridgway, Leicester Bodine Holland, Thomas Hunt Morgan, historian Caroline Robbins, mathematician Emmy Noether, neurobiologist Paul Grobstein, and Lillian Rosanoff Lieber, Richmond Lattimore, Tenney Frank, Mabel Louise Lang, and Lily Ross Taylor, the Spanish philosopher José Ferrater Mora, Germanic philologist Agathe Lasch, Classical philologist Wilmer Cave Wright, Hispanist and medievalist Georgiana Goddard King, poet Karl Kirchwey, decorated French Resistance officer Marcelle Pardé (French literature 1919 to 1929), and historian and author Amy Kelly.
