= Tad Szulc =

American writer and reporter

Tadeusz Witold Szulc (/ʃʌlz/ SHULZ; July 25, 1926 – May 21, 2001) was an author and foreign correspondent for The New York Times from 1953 to 1972. Szulc is credited with breaking the story of the Bay of Pigs invasion.

== Early life ==
Szulc was born in Warsaw, Poland, the son of Seweryn and Janina Baruch Szulc. He attended Institut Le Rosey in Switzerland. In 1940, he emigrated from Poland to join his family in Brazil; it had left Poland in the mid-1930s.

In Brazil, Szulc studied at the University of Brazil, but in 1945, he abandoned his studies to work as a reporter for the Associated Press in Rio de Janeiro.

== Career ==
=== Early career ===
In 1947, Szulc moved from Brazil to New York City, and in 1954, he became a US citizen. His emigration had been sponsored by United States Ambassador John Cooper Wiley, who was married to his aunt.

=== The New York Times ===
From 1953 to 1972, Szulc was a foreign correspondent for The New York Times.

In 1961, Szulc reported on preparations for a US-sponsored assault on Cuba by anti-Castro forces - the counterinsurgency that would become known as the Bay of Pigs Invasion. This reporting, and the stories published in the New York Times, have become the subject of a long-standing dispute about whether the U.S. government tried to suppress the story, and whether the New York Times went along and killed it.

In The Powers That Be, David Halberstam writes that "In early 1961 Tad Szulc of the New York Times, who had very good Latin-American sources, picked up the story that the CIA was recruiting and training Cuban exiles at a camp in Guatemala." According to Halberstam, Szulc was far from the only journalist who knew about the preparations: "The training camp was something of an open secret. The Nation had written an editorial about it in 1960, but there had been an almost deliberate attempt by the rest of the American press not to know too much about it."

Halberstam reports that as word began to leak out that Szulc was planning to publish an article about the invasion preparations, "President Kennedy called Scotty Reston, the Times's Washington bureau chief, and tried to get him to kill it. Kennedy argued strongly and passionately about what the Szulc story would do to his policy and spoke darkly of what the Times's responsibilities should be.... Reston, somewhat shaken, called Orvil Dryfoos, the publisher, and passed on Kennedy's comments.... Reston suggested toning down the story and removing the references to the forthcoming invasion. Dryfoos agreed and ordered the story sanitized."

The Times editors agreed to remove the word "imminent" from the article, reasoning that the word was a prediction more than a provable fact. They also decided to remove the references to the CIA's role in planning the attack, changing the references to "U.S. officials." Perhaps most importantly, they decided to run the article under a single-column headline instead the four-column banner that had been planned - a headline which would have designated the story as one of "exceptional importance," according to the memoir of Times reporter Harrison Salisbury.

According to Halberstam, because of these choices "Some editors in New York were absolutely enraged, and they demanded that Dryfoos meet with them. It was a very heated meeting. Dryfoos was clearly surprised by the degree of anger among his own people." Nevertheless, Dryfoos held firm, and the "much sanitized" version of the story ran on April 7, 1961, followed by more reporting in later articles.

The invasion took place on April 16, and was crushed by Castro's Cuban Revolutionary Forces within three days.

According to American University scholar W. Joseph Campbell, the decision by the Times to "sanitize" its coverage has swelled into a mythical event in which President Kennedy called Dryfoos directly to demand that the newspaper spike the story, and Dryfoos agreed not to run it at all. Given the publication of Szulc's article on April 7, that version is clearly myth. Campbell has also found no evidence in White House phone logs to support the notion that Kennedy called Dryfoos on April 6. But his published findings do not refute Halberstam's assertion that Kennedy called Reston, and Reston passed on Kennedy's pressures to Dryfoos.

Szulc's interest in Cuba continued over time, and he published an in-depth biography of Fidel Castro.

In 1968, Szulc was a reporter in Czechoslovakia during the Soviet invasion against the Prague Spring.

== Other publications ==
Szulc also wrote articles regarding Latin America for several other publications, including The New Yorker, Esquire, Penthouse, National Geographic, and The Progressive.

== Testimony on the CIA and the Israeli nuclear program ==
In June 1975, Szulc testified before the Church Committee (the Senate Select Committee to Study Governmental Operations with Respect to Intelligence Activities) regarding a story he was investigating for Penthouse magazine. Szulc testified that he had received information that the CIA's counterintelligence division, then headed by James Angleton, had provided Israeli intelligence with technical assistance and the services of nuclear physicists in the late 1950s, subsequent to the 1956 Suez War, to aid in developing a nuclear weapon.

Szulc testified that he met with Angleton in the spring of 1975 to confirm the story. According to Szulc, Angleton "told me that essentially this information was correct," with two corrections: that the timeframe was the late 1950s (not the '60s) and that no fissionable material, such as plutonium, had been provided. Szulc also testified that when he specifically asked if the British-born scientist Dr. Wilfrid Mann was involved, Angleton "confirmed that indeed this was the case" and warned that publishing the story could be "enormously... dangerous to Dr. Mann personally," possibly to the point of suicide.

Nine days later, on June 19, 1975, James Angleton testified before the same committee. While Angleton confirmed that the meeting with Szulc at the home of their mutual friend Benjamin Wells did occur, he directly and completely contradicted Szulc's account under oath. When asked by committee counsel if he had denied the story about transferring atomic technology, Angleton testified, "I said, it is wrong." When the committee read back Szulc's specific testimony—that Angleton had confirmed the story but denied the transfer of fissionable material—Angleton replied, "That is completely false" and "That is absolutely false."

== Possible Soviet asset ==
In 2025, newly released CIA documents included a 1977 memo which discussed the possibility of Szulc being a Soviet asset.

== Death ==
In 2001, Szulc died of cancer at his home, in Washington, D.C. He was survived by his wife and his two children.

He was a Knight of the French Légion d'honneur.

== Books ==
External videos
- Booknotes interview with Szulc on Then and Now: How the World Has Changed Since World War II, August 19, 1990, C-SPAN

- Pope John Paul II: The Biography (ISBN 0-671-00047-0)
- Chopin in Paris: The Life and Times of the Romantic Composer, Scribner, 1998 (ISBN 0-306-80933-8)
- The Secret Alliance: The Extraordinary Story of the Rescue of the Jews Since World War II (ISBN 0-374-24946-6)
- Fidel: A Critical Portrait (ISBN 0-688-04645-2)
- To Kill the Pope : An Ecclesiastical Thriller (ISBN 0-684-83781-1)
- Twilight of the Tyrants
- The Cuban Invasion
- The Winds of Resolution
- Dominican Diary
- Latin America (ISBN 0-689-10266-6)
- The Bombs of Palomares
- Portrait of Spain (ISBN 0-07-062654-5)
- Czechoslovakia Since World War II (ISBN 0-448-00007-5)
- Innocents at Home (ISBN 0-670-39843-8)
- Compulsive Spy: The Strange Career of E. Howard Hunt (ISBN 0-670-23546-6)
- The Illusion of Peace: Foreign Policy in the Nixon Years, Viking, 1978
- Then and Now: How the World Has Changed Since WW II (ISBN 0-688-07558-4)
