= Grace Frank =

American medievalist and lecturer

- Born: Grace Edith Mayer; June 28, 1886; New Haven, Connecticut
- Died: March 22, 1978 (aged 91); Hightstown, New Jersey
- Education: University of Chicago (BA); Bryn Mawr College, University of Göttingen, University of Berlin (Graduate)
- Occupations: Medievalist and Lecturer
- Known for: Study of medieval theatre
- Notable work: The Medieval French Drama (1954)
- Spouse: Tenney Frank

Grace Mayer Frank (born Grace Edith Mayer; June 28, 1886 – March 22, 1978) was an American medievalist and lecturer. Frank, along with her spouse, the classicist Tenney Frank, was primarily associated with Bryn Mawr College, first as a graduate student, and later as a Lecturer and Associate Professor of Romance Philosophy and Old French. Beginning in 1919, Frank lived in Baltimore, Maryland, where she would reside for the majority of her life, serving also as a Visiting Professor of Romance Philology at Johns Hopkins University in that city.

A specialist in French medieval theatre and poetry, Frank produced numerous critical editions and over 40 scholarly articles in the field. Her best-known work was the monograph The Medieval French Drama (1954), a survey of French drama to the 15th century, considered "an authoritative reference work" for the subject. Her influence on her field was such that a 2005 essay claimed that "it seem[ed] almost impossible to read an article or a book on the subject of medieval French drama without finding a reference to her scholarship."

== Early life ==
Born June 28, 1886, in New Haven, Connecticut, Grace Edith Mayer, the daughter of Murray C. and Fannie N. Mayer, was raised in Chicago, Illinois. In 1902, she graduated from Drexel Institute, and matriculated to the University of Chicago, where she was a member of Phi Beta Kappa and obtained her Bachelor of Arts degree in December 1906. She married classical scholar Tenney Frank on May 28 of the same year. Tenney Frank would soon become an influential academic, author of twelve books and 150 articles, and much of Grace Frank's travel after marriage was determined by the academic postings of her husband.

In 1908, Frank moved with her husband to Bryn Mawr, Pennsylvania, where Tenney Frank was a Professor of Latin at Bryn Mawr College until 1919. Her first published work was during this period, an English translation from German of Hermann Sudermann's Roses, four one-act plays in 1909. Grace Frank continued her graduate studies at Bryn Mawr, followed by studies at University of Göttingen and University of Berlin in 1910–1911.

== Academic career ==
In the mid-1920s, Frank and her husband conducted research in Tunisia, studying Roman ruins near Tunis, Carthage, Medjez-el-Bab, Sfax and Sousse. At this time, the couple had been residing in Rome due to Tenney Frank's appointment as professor in charge at the American Academy in Rome. During her time in Rome, Grace Frank was able to edit a recently discovered French manuscript from the Vatican Library, the Passion du Palatinus, the critical edition of which she would publish in 1922. The text was a 14th-century copy of a play believed to have dated to the 13th or early 14th century. In her introduction, Frank claimed that this manuscript was the "oldest known integral French example of the Passion." Three years later, she published another critical edition, this time of Rutebeuf's play Le Miracle de Théophile, an edition which became the standard text of the play.

Grace Frank was made a lecturer in Romance philosophy at Bryn Mawr College in 1926. However, beginning in 1919, Tenney Frank was made professor of Latin at Johns Hopkins University in Baltimore, which required the couple to relocate there. As a result, for the next 25 years, Grace Frank commuted weekly from the couple's home in Baltimore to the campus of Bryn Mawr in Pennsylvania.

In the 1930s, Frank published another three critical editions of French texts, two of which were Passions. Her edition of Le Livre de la Passion, Poème narratif du XIVe siècle (1930), analyzed five 15th-century manuscripts based on a 14th-century narrative. Her edition of La Passion d'Autun (1934) analyzed the relationship between two closely related 13th or early 14th-century poems (Passion de Biard & Passion de Roman), distinguished by their copyists. In 1937, she worked with art historian Dorothy Miner to publish Proverbes en rimes. Text and Illustrations of the Fifteenth Century from a French manuscript in the Walters Art Museum, which photographically reproduced 186 eight-line rhymed proverbs, each with accompanying pen-and-ink illustration, from a 15th-century manuscript. Miner provided a study of the work's iconography, while Frank's introduction and notes speculated on the provenance, author and date of the work. Apart from her monographs, Frank's academic output was prolific: she published at least 43 journal articles, and a further 84 reviews of academic books. In addition to her journal output, she published an additional 138 reviews of more popular works (such as those of Edith Wharton and Arnold Bennett) in the Saturday Review of Literature between 1926 and 1947.

Frank became professor emerita of Old French at Bryn Mawr in 1952. In 1954, she published her principal monograph The Medieval French Drama, which was promoted as "the first history in English of the medieval French drama." According to a critical bibliography of her work, the book was "warmly received by nearly all reviewers." Since its release, the work has had a large influence on the field, being described in a 1980 review of Frank's life as "the standard treatment of the subject." Frank's final scholarly publication was a review of The Production of Medieval Church Music-Drama in 1972.

== Life outside academia ==
Outside of the academy, Frank was an accomplished pianist, and also enjoyed mountain climbing and studying the migration of birds.

During the First World War, Frank first worked in Washington, D.C., for the office of censorship and wrote war propaganda. Later in the war, she volunteered in Italy as a Red Cross nurse. After the outbreak of World War II, Frank was a member of the Committee to Defend America by Aiding the Allies, a group which favored the military support of the United Kingdom by the United States. She publicly opposed the anti-interventionist Charles Lindbergh in the pages of the Baltimore Sun. After the United States joined the war, Frank served as a civilian volunteer with the Army Air Forces Aircraft Warning Service in Baltimore. In her later curriculum vitae, Frank also listed an affiliation with the wartime Office of Strategic Services.

Frank was active in society life at Bryn Mawr and Baltimore, as well as a participant in several professional organizations. She served as the Chairman of the scholarship committee and vice-president of the Bryn Mawr College Club of Baltimore. She was a patron of the Homewood Playshop of the Johns Hopkins University, as well as the JHU Glee Club and Johns Hopkins Band. She was a member of JHU's Philological Society, History of Ideas Club & Faculty Club. She served on the committee to host the Archaeological Institute of America and American Philological Association in the city. She also gave lectures open to the public at Bryn Mawr. A founding member of the Medieval Academy of America, Frank was the organization's third Vice-President from 1948 to 1951. She became a Fellow of the organization in 1950. She was also made a vice-president of the Modern Language Association in 1957.

In later life, Frank was a frequent author of letters to the editor of the Baltimore Sun. In one such letter she defended the "humanistic studies" against a perceived overemphasis on the technical sciences. Frank valued her adopted home of Baltimore, but criticized what she saw as the city's neglect of funding for the arts in favor of "throughways and skyscrapers alone." She was an advocate of increased rail service into the city core, in opposition to highway projects then under consideration. A Democrat, Frank was a supporter of the presidential candidacies of Adlai Stevenson II in 1960 and Hubert Humphrey in 1968.

Frank moved from her Roland Park home to a retirement home in Hightstown, New Jersey, in the spring of 1977, where she died following a heart attack on March 22, 1978.

== Legacy ==
Frank's primary work, The Medieval French Drama, has been reprinted several times since its initial publication. The text continues to be a relevant survey of the subject in 21st century English and French-language scholarship, that, in the words of one contemporary scholar, "remains today an authoritative reference work, admired and appreciated by all who use it."

Grace Frank supervised several doctoral dissertations despite never having achieved a PhD herself. Among the academics she supervised as students were Ruth Whittredge, Barbara M. Craig and Margaret Louise Switten.

In 2000, the Medieval Academy of America established an annual dissertation grant in honor of Frank.

== Partial bibliography ==
=== Books ===
- (Trans.) Hermann Sudermann, Roses, four one-act plays, New York 1909, London/New York 1912
- (Ed.) La passion du Palatinus. Mystère du XIVeme siècle, Paris 1922, 1972, présenté et traduit par Jacques Ribard, Paris 1992
- (Ed.) Le miracle de Théophile. Miracle du XIIIe siècle, Paris 1925, 1949, 1967, 1975, 1986
- (Ed.) Le livre de la passion. Poème narratif du XIVe siècle, Paris 1930
- (Ed.) La Passion d’Autun, Paris 1934
- (Ed. with Dorothy Miner) Proverbes en rimes. Text and illustrations of the fifteenth century from a French manuscript in the Walters Art Museum, Baltimore 1937
- The Medieval French Drama, Oxford 1954, 1960, 1972

=== Journal articles ===
- Frank, Grace (1918). "Revisions in the English Mystery Plays". Modern Philology. 15 (9): 565–572. doi:10.1086/387152. ISSN 0026-8232. JSTOR 432786.
- Frank, Grace (1920). "The Palatine Passion and the Development of the Passion Play". PMLA. 35 (4): 464–483. doi:10.2307/457348. ISSN 0030-8129. JSTOR 457348. S2CID 163370644.
- Frank, Grace (1920). "Vernacular Sources and an Old French Passion Play". Modern Language Notes. 35 (5): 257–269. doi:10.2307/2914832. ISSN 0149-6611. JSTOR 2914832.
- Frank, Grace (1921). "Critical Notes on the Palatine Passion". Modern Language Notes. 36 (4): 193–204. doi:10.2307/2914928. ISSN 0149-6611. JSTOR 2914928.
- Frank, Grace (1923). "The Sources of the Oldest Known Edition of Villon". Romania. 49 (196): 587–591. doi:10.3406/roma.1923.4564. ISSN 0035-8029. JSTOR 45044533.
- Frank, Grace (1923). "Vossianus Q 86 and Reginensis 333". The American Journal of Philology. 44 (1): 67–70. doi:10.2307/289647. ISSN 0002-9475. JSTOR 289647.
- Frank, Grace (1925). "A MS. of Mellin de Saint-Gelais' Works". Modern Language Notes. 40 (1): 61. doi:10.2307/2914348. ISSN 0149-6611. JSTOR 2914348.
- Frank, Grace (1925). "English Manuscripts in the Vatican Library". PMLA. 40 (1): 98–102. doi:10.2307/457270. ISSN 0030-8129. JSTOR 457270. S2CID 164064143.
- Frank, Grace (1925). "The Early Work of Charles Fontaine". Modern Philology. 23 (1): 47–60. doi:10.1086/387568. ISSN 0026-8232. JSTOR 433850. S2CID 162330934.
- Frank, Grace (1929). "On the Relation between the York and Towneley Plays". PMLA. 44 (1): 313–319. doi:10.2307/457683. ISSN 0030-8129. JSTOR 457683. S2CID 164171254.
- Frank, Grace (1929). "St. Martial of Limoges in the York Plays". Modern Language Notes. 44 (4): 233–235. doi:10.2307/2913112. ISSN 0149-6611. JSTOR 2913112.
- Frank, Grace (1931). "Popular Iconography of the Passion". PMLA. 46 (2): 333–340. doi:10.2307/458038. ISSN 0030-8129. JSTOR 458038. S2CID 163193700.
- Frank, Grace (1932). "Villon at the Court of Charles d'Orleans". Modern Language Notes. 47 (8): 498–505. doi:10.2307/2913749. ISSN 0149-6611. JSTOR 2913749.
- Frank, Grace (1932). "The Cues in Aucassin et Nicolette". Modern Language Notes. 47 (1): 14–16. doi:10.2307/2913368. ISSN 0149-6611. JSTOR 2913368.
- Frank, Grace (1932). "Villon's Lais and his Journey to Angers". Modern Language Notes. 47 (3): 154–159. doi:10.2307/2913614. ISSN 0149-6611. JSTOR 2913614.
- Frank, Grace (1933). "Aoi in the Chanson de Roland". PMLA. 48 (3): 629–635. doi:10.2307/458332. ISSN 0030-8129. JSTOR 458332. S2CID 164038752.
- Frank, Grace (1935). "Wine Reckonings in Bodel's Jeu de S. Nicolas". Modern Language Notes. 50 (1): 9–13. doi:10.2307/2912798. ISSN 0149-6611. JSTOR 2912798.
- Frank, Grace (1936). "The Authorship of Le Mystère de Griseldis". Modern Language Notes. 51 (4): 217–222. doi:10.2307/2912111. ISSN 0149-6611. JSTOR 2912111.
- Frank, Grace (1936). "The Beginnings of Comedy in France". The Modern Language Review. 31 (3): 377–384. doi:10.2307/3715051. ISSN 0026-7937. JSTOR 3715051.
- Frank, Grace (1938). "Faire ravoir les gages". Modern Language Notes. 53 (8): 603–604. doi:10.2307/2912972. ISSN 0149-6611. JSTOR 2912972.
- Frank, Grace (1939). "Historical Elements in the Chansons de Geste". Speculum. 14 (2): 209–214. doi:10.2307/2849488. ISSN 0038-7134. JSTOR 2849488. S2CID 164019746.
- Frank, Grace (1940). "As by the Whelp Chastised is the Leon". Modern Language Notes. 55 (6): 481. doi:10.2307/2910338. ISSN 0149-6611. JSTOR 2910338.
- Frank, Grace (1941). "Pathelin". Modern Language Notes. 56 (1): 42–47. doi:10.2307/2910968. ISSN 0149-6611. JSTOR 2910968.
- Frank, Grace (1942). "The Distant Love of Jaufré Rudel". Modern Language Notes. 57 (7): 528–534. doi:10.2307/2910627. ISSN 0149-6611. JSTOR 2910627.
- Frank, Grace (1942). "Voltaire to Mazzuchelli". Modern Language Notes. 57 (5): 355–356. doi:10.2307/2910165. ISSN 0149-6611. JSTOR 2910165.
- Frank, Grace (1943). "Proverbs in Medieval Literature". Modern Language Notes. 58 (7): 508–515. doi:10.2307/2911058. ISSN 0149-6611. JSTOR 2911058.
- Frank, Grace (1944). "The Genesis and Staging of the Jeu D' Adam". PMLA. 59 (1): 7–17. doi:10.2307/458841. ISSN 0030-8129. JSTOR 458841. S2CID 163696205.
- Frank, Grace (1944). "Biaus Niés". Modern Language Notes. 59 (2): 92–93. doi:10.2307/2910598. ISSN 0149-6611. JSTOR 2910598.
- Frank, Grace (1944). "Jaufré Rudel, Casella and Spitzer". Modern Language Notes. 59 (8): 526–532. doi:10.2307/2910641. ISSN 0149-6611. JSTOR 2910641.
- Frank, Grace (1946). "Villon's Adversary". Modern Language Notes. 61 (2): 113–115. doi:10.2307/2909062. ISSN 0149-6611. JSTOR 2909062.
- Frank, Grace (1948). "Marie de France and the Tristram Legend". PMLA. 63 (2): 405–411. doi:10.2307/459423. ISSN 0030-8129. JSTOR 459423. S2CID 163733127.
- "Rutebeuf and Theophile". Romanic Review; New York. 43 (3): 161–165. 1952. ISSN 0035-8118.
- Frank, Grace (1959). "Erasures in the "Miracles de Nostre Dame" and the Confrérie de la Passion". Romance Philology. 12 (3): 240–243. ISSN 0035-8002. JSTOR 44939013.
- Frank, Grace (1967). "Villon's Poetry and the Biographical Approach". L'Esprit Créateur. 7 (3): 159–169. ISSN 0014-0767. JSTOR 26277329.
