= Léonie Adams =

American poet (1899–1988)

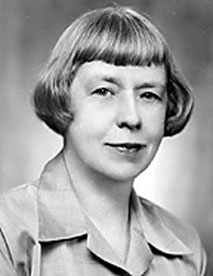
- Born: Léonie Fuller; December 9, 1899; Brooklyn, New York, U.S.
- Died: June 27, 1988 (aged 88); New Milford, Connecticut, U.S.
- Education: Barnard College (BA)
- Occupation: Poet

Léonie Fuller Adams (December 9, 1899 – June 27, 1988) was an American poet. She was appointed the seventh Poet Laureate Consultant in Poetry to the Library of Congress in 1948.

== Early life ==
Adams was born in Brooklyn, New York, and raised in an unusually strict environment. She was not allowed on the subway until she was eighteen, and even then, her father accompanied her. Her sister was the teacher and archaeologist Louise Holland and her brother-in-law the archaeologist Leicester Bodine Holland. She studied at Barnard College, where she was a contemporary and friend of roommate Margaret Mead. While still an undergraduate, she showed remarkable skill as a poet, and at this time her poems began to be published.

== Career ==
In 1924, she became the editor of The Measure. Her first volume of poetry, titled Those Not Elect, was published in 1925.

In the spring of 1928, she had a brief affair with Edmund Wilson. Adams apologized to Wilson for having "moped and quarreled" on the day she left for France.

While in London, Adams met Hilda Doolittle, who introduced her to several figures in the London literary scene; in Paris she was invited to tea by Gertrude Stein. At the beginning of 1929, when Wilson wrote to her that he was thinking of marrying another woman, Adams wrote back that she had had a pregnancy and hinted that she had had a miscarriage, mentioning the need for a visit to a London doctor in October. Guilt over the pregnancy — both Wilson, and a former student, Judith Farr, reported that Adams had a gift for making others feel guilty — combined with his heavy drinking, and indecision in other elements of his personal life led Wilson to a nervous collapse. Louise Bogan later revealed to him that Léonie's pregnancy had been imaginary, and this caused a temporary rift between Bogan and Adams.

In 1929, her volume High Falcon was published. During the 1930s, she lived in the Ramapo Mountains near Hillburn, New York, and commuted to New York City to lecture on Victorian poetry at New York University. In 1930, she met writer and fellow New York University teacher William Troy. The two married in 1933. That same year she published This Measure. In 1935 she and her husband joined the faculty of Bennington College.

She taught English at various other colleges and universities including Douglass College (then known as the New Jersey College for Women), the University of Washington, the Bread Loaf Writers' Conference, Columbia University, and Sarah Lawrence College. The poets for whom Adams acted as a mentor included Louise Glück, recipient of the 2020 Nobel Prize in Literature and former United States Poet Laureate. Fantasy writer, poet and editor Lin Carter attended her Poetry Workshop while studying at Columbia University. Marcella Comès Winslow painted a portrait of Adams in 1947. In 1950, she received an honorary doctorate from the New Jersey College for Women.

Her Poems: A Selection won the 1954 Bollingen Prize. In a review of the book, Louise Bogan wrote: "Poems such as "Companions of the Morass," "For Harvest," "Grapes Making," and "The Runner with the Lots" spring from and are indications of a poetic endowment as deep as it is rare."

In 1955, in a brief autobiography written for a biographical dictionary of modern literature, Adams threw a little light on her religious and political views: "My father... made me a childhood agnostic — I am now a Roman Catholic.... I am a very liberal democrat."

In 1988, she died at the age of 88 in New Milford, Connecticut.

== Poetic style ==
Superficially, Léonie Adams' style did not change greatly over her lifetime, but there was an initial shy wonder at the world that eventually became an intense and almost devotional lyricism. Her rich descriptions demonstrated great delicacy of perception and an exalted spirit. She bore comparison with Henry Vaughan and 17th century metaphysical poetry, especially in her near-religious ecstasy. In a mid-2000s critical commentary for the Wom-Po (Discussion of Women's Poetry) website, poet Annie Finch provided a more postmodern reading of Adams as "a lush, sensual poet who directed her sensuality not towards other people but primarily towards the materials of poetry, towards syntax and symbol, diction and word-sound, in short, towards the language itself," and went on to say that "Adams' poetry teases the balance between the incantatory and representational powers of poetic language. She uses the sounds of language as counterweights to her poems' ostensible meanings, complicating the act of reading and calling into question a reader's emotional responses."

== Prizes and awards ==
- 1954: the Bollingen Prize for Poems: A Selection (1954)
- 1974: Academy Fellowship from the Academy of American Poets
- the Shelley Memorial Award
- fellowship from The Guggenheim Foundation
- grants from The National Council of the Arts and The National Institute of Arts and Letters,

== Poetry collections ==
- Those Not Elect, Robert M. McBride & Co, 1925; Reprint Services Corp, 1992, ISBN 978-0-7812-6913-1
- High Falcon and Other Poems, John Day, New York, 1929.
- Midsummer, Ward Ritchie, 1929
- This Measure, A. A. Knopf, 1933
- Poems: A selection, Funk & Wagnalls, 1954

=== Edited and translated ===
- The Lyrics of Francois Villon, Limited Editions Club, New York, 1933.

=== Children's books ===
- "A casque for Amadis," The Metropolitan Museum of Art, 1928.
- "The tale of Tenjin : or how a much-abused man became a saint," The Metropolitan Museum of Art, 1928.

=== Anthologies ===
- David Lehman, ed. (2006). "Magnificat in Little; The Horn; The Figurehead; Bell Tower". The Oxford book of American poetry. Oxford University Press. ISBN 978-0-19-516251-6.
- David Cecil, Allen Tate, ed. (1958). "Country Summer; Caryatid; Early Waking; These Not Elect; Grapes Making". Modern Verse in English. Taylor & Francis.
