= Jane Flanders =

American poet

- Born: March 26, 1940; Waynesboro, Pennsylvania
- Died: April 12, 2001 (aged 61)
- Education: Bryn Mawr College; Columbia University
- Writing career
- Genre: Poetry

Jane Flanders (March 26, 1940 – April 12, 2001) was an American poet. She was the author of three books of poetry and three posthumous volumes.

Flanders won the Discovery/The Nation Award, the Juniper Prize, and the Pushcart Prize three times, among many other awards.

== Life ==
Jane Ann Hess (Flanders) was born in Waynesboro, Pennsylvania, on March 26, 1940. She lived in Waynesboro until leaving for Bryn Mawr College in 1958. Her Pennsylvania roots were very deep and inform much of her work. Her parents remained in the house where she grew up until somewhat after her death, and her ancestors had lived in Pennsylvania for many generations.

After two years teaching English at the Punahou School in Hawaii (from 1962 through 1964, well before Barack Obama was in attendance), she obtained an M.A. in English (history of the English language) at Columbia University. Though she had considerable financial and other support, she declined to complete her work toward a Ph.D., regarding herself more as an artist than a scholar. After her 1966 marriage to Steven Flanders, she had three children, who were brought up in Washington, D.C., and Pelham, New York. At various times she taught at Clark University, Sarah Lawrence College, the University of Cincinnati, and the University of Pittsburgh, among other institutions She died of cancer on April 12, 2001, after an illness that had begun well before her January 1999 diagnosis. As many of her poems evidence, she was strongly interested in many of the arts. She was an excellent pianist and majored in music in college. A memorial plaque at the "Jane Flanders Nook" on the Bryn Mawr campus describes her as "Poet, Musician, Gardener."

Her work appeared in The Atlantic, Chelsea, Commonweal, The Massachusetts Review, The Nation, New England Review, The New Republic, The New Yorker, Poetry, and other periodicals. Her work is widely admired by poets and other literary figures. Joyce Carol Oates said of her first published volume that, "Many of her poems have the bite and sting of Ann Sexton's poetry, but they are admirably restrained as well, tracing the necessary journey one makes in "coming back" to one's deepest self after a busy, extroverted life." Publishers Weekly described her as "a radiant poet," a characterization Karl Kirchwey adopted as the title of an appreciation in which he compares her to Elizabeth Bishop. Ben Howard opened a review in Poetry by saying, "Jane Flanders's gentle poems juxtapose the romantic image and the homely fact, the operatic agony and the mundane tribulation." Andrew Hudgins in The Hudson Review characterized the entire body of her work: "In her wise and often humorous poems Flanders constantly probes the commonplace, seeking what message it has to reveal about the infinite or to discover in what way a particular moment contains the eternal."

== Books ==
- Leaving and Coming Back (Quarterly Review of Literature, 1980)
- The Students of Snow (University of Massachusetts Press, 1982) ISBN 0-87023-378-5
- Timepiece (University of Pittsburgh Press, 1988) ISBN 0-8229-5399-4
- Sudden Plenty (The Bunny and the Crocodile Press, 2003) ISBN 0-938572-40-7
- Manifesto d'Amore (The Bunny and the Crocodile Press, 2005) ISBN 0-938572-45-8
- Dandelion Greens (The Bunny and the Crocodile Press, 2009) ISBN 978-0-938572-48-0
