= Paul Grobstein =

American neuroscientist

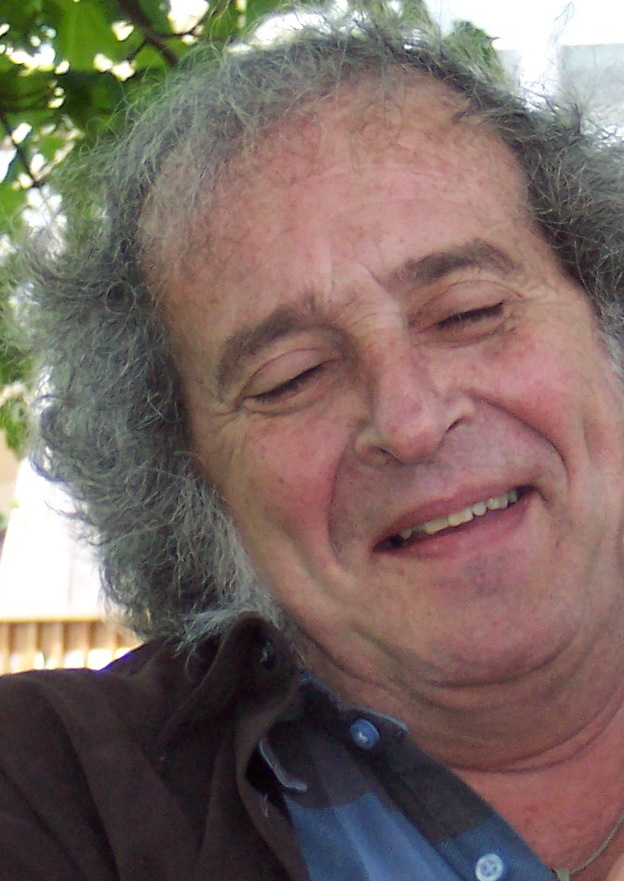
- Paul Grobstein, 2005
- Born: March 21, 1946; Long Beach, California, United States
- Died: June 28, 2011 (aged 65)
- Education: Harvard University (BA 1969); Stanford University (MA 1970; PhD 1973)
- Spouse: Margaret (Peg) Hollyday (widowed)
- Children: Jed Grobstein and Rachel Grobstein
- Awards: Alfred P. Sloan Foundation Fellowship; Eleanor A. Bliss Professorship; Rosalyn R. Schwartz Teaching Award
- Scientific career
- Fields: Neuroscience
- Workplaces: University of Chicago; Bryn Mawr College
- Doctoral advisor: Donald Kennedy
- Website: https://serendipstudio.org/local/grobstein.html

Paul Grobstein (March 21, 1946 – June 28, 2011) was an American neurobiologist who studied the development and organization of nervous systems. In addition to his work in neurobiology, Grobstein had a long-term interest in understanding people's behavior.

== Early life ==
Paul was born on March 21, 1946, in Los Angeles to Rose Gruver Grobstein and Clifford Grobstein. Clifford Grobstein, an American biologist and cancer researcher, was a member of the National Academy of Sciences. Rose Grobstein, an American social worker, was a pioneer and “founding mother” in the field of genetic counseling. Paul grew up with one younger sister, Joan Grobstein. In 1950 the family lived in Bethesda, Maryland. Later they moved to Palo Alto, California where Clifford was on the Stanford University faculty and Paul attended Palo Alto High School.

== Education and career ==
Grobstein received his Bachelor of Arts degree in biology from Harvard University in 1969 and his Master of Arts and PhD in biology from Stanford University in 1970 and 1973. After postdoctoral fellowships at Johns Hopkins University and Stanford University, Grobstein joined the faculty of the University of Chicago in 1974 as an assistant professor; he left Chicago in 1985 as an associate professor. Grobstein spent the rest of his academic career at Bryn Mawr College where he joined the biology department as chair and professor in 1986. In 1988 he was awarded the Eleanor A. Bliss Professorship at Bryn Mawr, and he founded the Summer Institutes for K-12 Teachers in 1990 which brought hundreds of local educators to campus to consider new ways of teaching science and math. In 2000 he founded and was director of the Center for Science in Society. Grobstein was associate editor of the Journal of Research Practice from 2005 to 2011.

== Research and innovation ==
His laboratory research concentrated on the development and organization of the nervous systems of various animals including crayfish, rabbits, leeches, and significantly frogs, where the focus of his work was "the nature of spatial representations and the origins, organization, regulation, and significance of unpredictability in neuronal function and behavior". In addition to his work in neurobiology Grobstein had a long-term interest in understanding people's behavior. In 1994, together with Deepak Kumar, Professor of Computer Science at Bryn Mawr College, and Ann Dixon, Bryn Mawr College alumna, he created Serendip, an intellectual community dedicated to gathering people together for the exploration of science. Serendip was the first website on the Bryn Mawr campus and originally Serendip hosted the Bryn Mawr College website. In 2005 the site consisted of over 20,000 pages and averaged 20,000 unique visitors a day. The site has a section that encourages interactive educational experiences and another that promotes online interactive discussions. There are many other sections on the site including a more recent addition that provides resources for teaching about the coronavirus.

== Recognition ==
Grobstein was an Alfred P. Sloan Foundation Fellow from 1976 to 1980. Grobstein received the Rosalyn R. Schwartz Teaching Award for teaching excellence and campus leadership at Bryn Mawr in 1988. In that same year he was appointed to the Eleanor A. Bliss Professorship. In 2000 he was named founding director of the Center for Science in Society at Bryn Mawr. To honor Grobstein after his death in 2011 Bryn Mawr College established the Paul Grobstein Memorial Fund.

== Selected publications ==
- Grobstein, P., Extension-sensitivity in the crayfish abdomen, J. Comp. Physiol. 84 (1973), 331―349.
- Grobstein, P., Dhow, K.L., and Fox, P.C., Development of receptive fields in rabbit visual cortex: changes in time course due to delayed eye-opening. Proc. Natl. Acad. Sci. 72 (1975), 1543–1545.
- Grobstein, P., Between the retinotectal projection and directed movement: topography of a sensorimotor interface, Brain, Behav. Evol. 31 (1988), 34–48.
- Grobstein, P. (1993). Strategies for analyzing complex organization in the nervous system: I. lesion experiments. In Computational neuroscience, 19–37.
- Grobstein, P., Variability in Brain Function and Behavior in The Encyclopedia of Human Behavior, Volume 4 (V.S. Ramachandran, editor), Academic Press, 1994, 447–458.
- Grobstein, P. (2003). Getting it less wrong, the brain’s way: Science, pragmatism, and multiplism. In Interpretation and Its Objects,153–166. Brill.
- Grobstein, P., Revisiting Science in Culture: Science as Story Telling and Story Revising, Journal of Research Practice, Volume 1.1 (2005), Article M1.
- Dalke, A.F., Cassidy, K., Grobstein, P. et al. Emergent pedagogy: learning to enjoy the uncontrollable—and make it productive. J Educ Change 8, 111–130 (2007).
