= R Leonis =

Variable star in the constellation Leo

- Location of R Leonis (circled)

Observation data Epoch J2000.0 Equinox ICRS
- Constellation: Leo
- Right ascension: 09^{h} 47^{m} 33.4840^{s}
- Declination: +11° 25′ 43.823″
- Apparent magnitude (V): 4.4 - 11.3

Characteristics
- Spectral type: M6e-M8IIIe-M9.5e
- Apparent magnitude (J): −0.7
- B−V color index: 1.26
- Variable type: Mira variable

Astrometry
Proper motion (μ)	RA: 6.132 mas/yr Dec.: −53.097 mas/yr
Parallax (π)	14.0566±0.8378 mas
Distance	372 ly (114 pc)

Details
Mass	0.7 M_{☉}
Radius	320 – 350 R_{☉}
Luminosity	3,537 L_{☉}
Temperature	2,930 – 3,080 K

Other designations
- R Leo, AAVSO 0942+11, BD+12°2096, HD 84748, HIP 48036, HR 3882, SAO 98769

Database references
SIMBAD	data

R Leonis is a red giant Mira-type variable star located approximately 370 light years away in the constellation Leo.

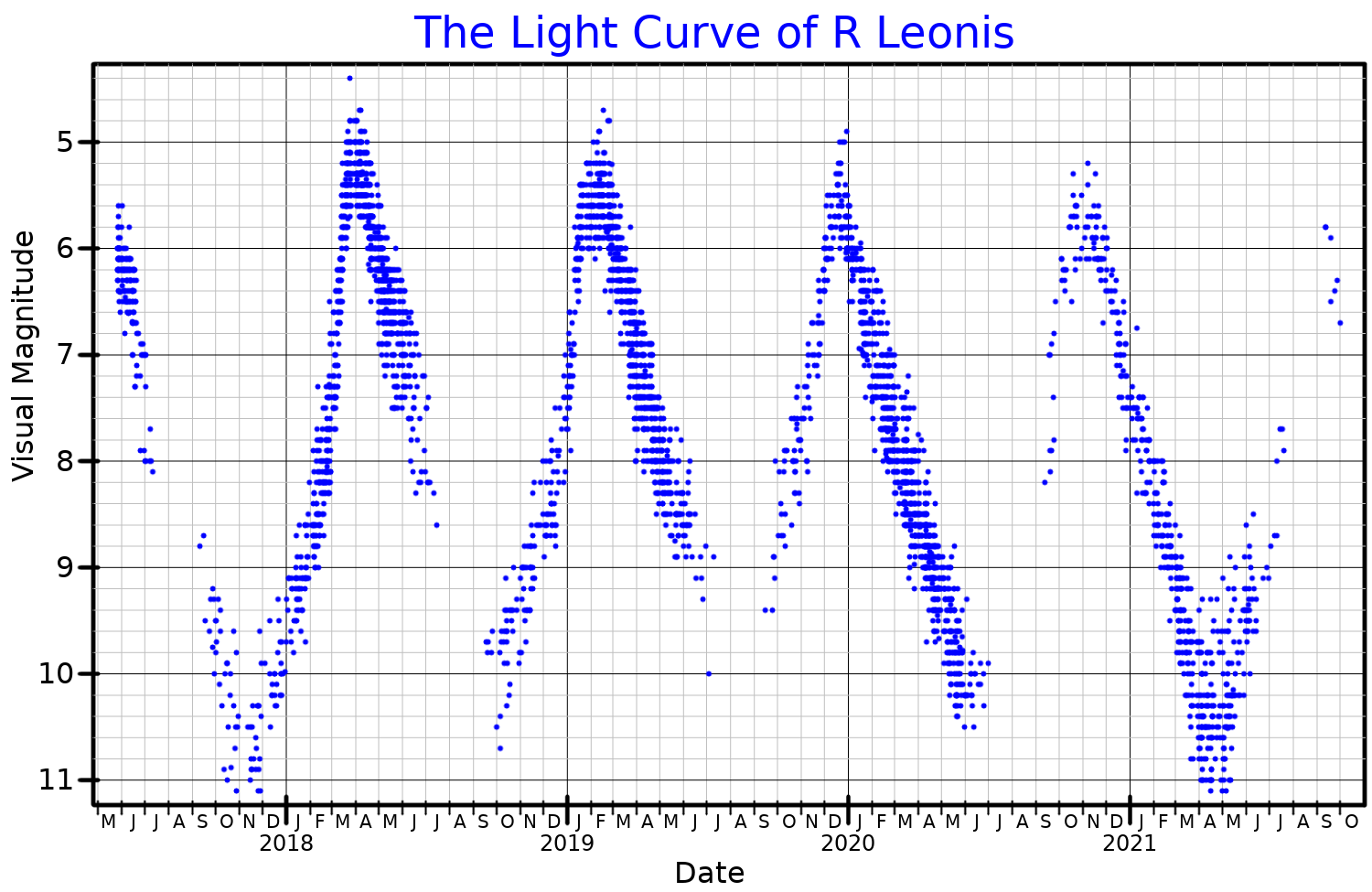
The light curve of R Leonis from AAVSO V band data

The apparent magnitude of R Leonis varies between 4.31 and 11.65 with a period of 312 days. At maximum it can be seen with the naked eye, while at minimum a telescope of at least 7 cm is needed. The star's effective temperature is estimated to be 2,930 – 3,080 kelvins and radius spans 320 solar radii (220,000,000 kilometres; 1.5 astronomical units), roughly Mars's orbital zone.

== Possible planet ==
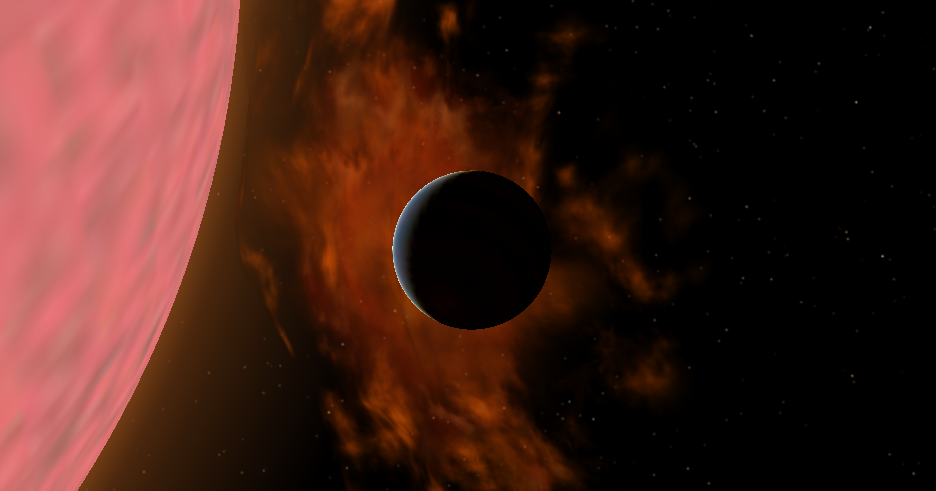
Artistic rendering of R Leonis's putative evaporating planetary companion

In 2009 Wiesemeyer et al. proposed that quasi-periodic fluctuations observed for the star R Leonis may be due to the presence of an evaporating substellar companion, probably an extrasolar planet. They have inferred a putative mass for the orbiting body of twice the mass of Jupiter, orbital period of 5.2 years and likely orbital separation of 2.7 astronomical units. If confirmed such a planetary object could likely be an evaporating planet, with a long comet-like trail as hinted by intense SiO maser emissions.

The R Leonis planetary system
Companion (in order from star)	Mass	Semimajor axis (AU)	Orbital period (days)	Eccentricity	Inclination (°)	Radius
b (unconfirmed)	≥2 M_{J}	≥2.7	1898	0	—	—
