= Wilfrid Basil Mann =

British physicist (1908–2001)

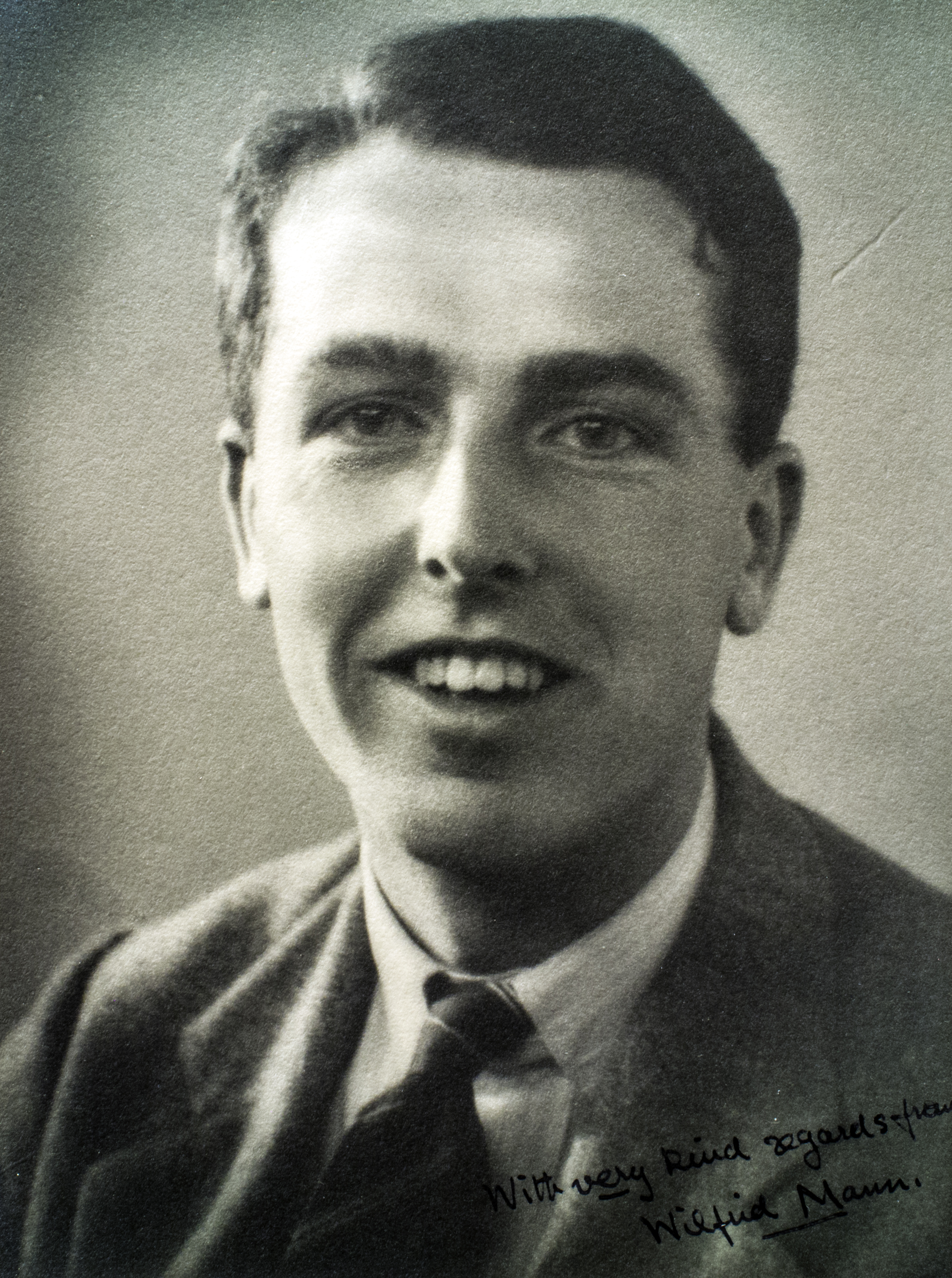
Portrait of Wilfrid Basil Mann from the 1930s at his time in Copenhagen

Wilfrid Basil Mann (4 August 1908 – 29 March 2001) was a radionuclide metrologist.

He was born in Ealing, Middlesex in the United Kingdom on 4 August 1908, receiving his doctorate in physics from Imperial College of Science and Technology in London in 1937. He did graduate work during the 1930s in Copenhagen and Berkeley. While at Berkeley he worked with E.O. Lawrence on the cyclotron in the radiation laboratory and was the discoverer of the radioisotope gallium-67, which is still in use in nuclear medicine.

His mentor at Imperial College was George Paget Thomson the British physicist in charge of the Tube Alloys project during the war years (the British nuclear program that was later incorporated into the Manhattan Project). He had Mann assigned to the British Embassy in Washington, D.C. and to the Chalk River Laboratory in Canada. In 1951, Wilfrid Mann came to the National Bureau of Standards (NBS) as the head of the Radioactivity Section. For the next 30 years Wilfrid Mann was the most influential radionuclide metrologist in the world.

During the early 1950s, he had a keen interest in the national standards for radium-226 and undertook microcalorimetric experiments to intercompare the national standards (Hönigschmid standards) of the United States, United Kingdom, Canada, and Germany. He retired from NBS in 1980.

Mann was obliged to deny claims that he was a member of the Cambridge Spy Ring in his 1982 memoir Was There A Fifth Man? Mann had been accused on several occasions of being the "fifth man," based on rumored work at the Embassy and the resemblance between his middle name and the "Basil" of investigative journalist Andrew Boyle's book Climate of Treason. In his memoirs, Mann argued using contemporary correspondence, publications, and verified passport entries that he was incapable of having worked with Donald Maclean in the British Embassy. As part of his hiring at the Bureau of Standards, Mann underwent intense security screening and received a top-level "Q" clearance from the U.S. Atomic Energy Commission.

In 1975, declassified testimony before the Church Committee (the Senate Select Committee to Study Governmental Operations with Respect to Intelligence Activities) revealed a separate controversy involving Mann. Journalist Tad Szulc testified on 10 June 1975, that he had information that the CIA's Counterintelligence division, headed by James Angleton, had provided Israeli intelligence with technical assistance and the services of nuclear physicists in the late 1950s to help them develop a nuclear weapon. Szulc testified that when he privately confronted Angleton with this information in March 1975, Angleton "essentially" confirmed the story was "correct," but clarified that no fissionable material (such as plutonium) was involved. According to Szulc's testimony, he explicitly asked Angleton if Mann was one of the scientists involved, to which Angleton "confirmed that indeed this was the case." Szulc also testified that Angleton warned him publication could be "enormously... dangerous to Dr. Mann personally," possibly driving him to "commit suicide", allegedly because Mann had been involved in earlier espionage situations related to the Cambridge Five and had been turned into a U.S. intelligence asset.

Nine days later, on 19 June 1975, James Angleton testified before the same committee. Angleton confirmed that the meeting with Szulc (at the home of their mutual friend, New York Times journalist and former OSS Officer Benjamin Wells) had occurred. However, Angleton directly and completely contradicted Szulc's account of their conversation. When asked by committee counsel if he had denied the story about transferring atomic technology to Israel, Angleton stated, "I said, it is wrong". When the committee specifically read back Szulc's testimony – which claimed Angleton had confirmed the story about providing technical assistance and scientists – Angleton replied under oath, "That is completely false," "This is false," and "I never made any such statement that I could confirm... this story."

Mann died in Towson, Maryland in 2001.

== Books ==
Mann's several texts include Radioactivity and Its Measurement, 1980 (Mann, Ayres, and Garfinkel), A Handbook of Radioactivity Measurements Procedures, NCRP Report 58, 1985 edition, and Radioactivity Measurements: Principles and Practice, 1988 (Mann, Rytz, and Spernol).
