= Tenney Frank =

American historian (1876–1939)

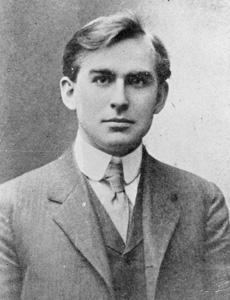
- Portrait of Tenney Frank
- Born: May 19, 1876; Clay Center, Kansas, US
- Died: April 3, 1939 (aged 62); Oxford, England
- Education: University of Kansas (BA, MA); University of Chicago (PhD)
- Occupations: Ancient historian and classical scholar
- Spouse: Grace Frank

Tenney Frank (May 19, 1876 – April 3, 1939) was a prominent American ancient historian and classical scholar. He studied many aspects of Ancient Rome, for instance its economy, imperialism, demographics and epigraphy.

== Biography ==
Tenney Frank earned his A.B. at the University of Kansas in 1898 and his A.M. the following year. Frank went on to receive his Ph.D. at the University of Chicago in 1903. Frank taught at Bryn Mawr College as a Professor of Latin from 1904 until 1919, when he moved to the Johns Hopkins University. At Bryn Mawr Frank wrote and published his influential study Roman Imperialism in 1914. Frank believed that Rome's imperialism stemmed from a desire to keep peace in the Mediterranean world by preventing the rise of any rival power. Frank's other work focused on classical literature, with articles on Cicero, Strabo, Curiatius Maternus, Plautus, and Virgil, among others. In 1932 he gave the British Academy's Master-Mind Lecture, on Cicero.

He wrote periodically for the American Historical Review, including a paper on the demise of the various ancient Italian peoples that comprised the Roman ethnicity in Julius Caesar's day. Arguing that Roman expansion brought in masses of foreign peoples and slaves that over time changed the ethnic make-up of the Roman populace and contributed to the empire's ruin.

He worked on Latin inscriptions, including the stele from the Forum Romanum in Rome, and on Roman construction and the Servian Wall of Rome. His work on the Roman economy was a seminal study of the economy and trade in the Roman world.

Frank was elected to the American Philosophical Society in 1927 and the American Academy of Arts and Sciences in 1935.

He married Grace Edith Mayer in 1907. Of Swedish ancestry, Frank was influenced by his agrarian roots. He was also multilingual and had a great facility for languages, including Scandinavian tongues. At Johns Hopkins, Frank trained Thomas Robert Shannon Broughton, with whom he collaborated on his studies of the Roman economy. A bibliography of Frank's work may be found in The American Journal of Philology 60.3 (1939).

Frank died on April 3, 1939, in Oxford, England while serving as a visiting professor at the University of Oxford. While in Oxford Frank was reportedly preparing for publication a new work entitled "Rome and Italy of the Empire". This appeared posthumously as Volume 5 of An Economic Survey of Ancient Rome.

== Works ==
- (1903). A Stichometric Scholium to the Medea of Euripides, The University of Chicago Press.
- (1904). Attraction of Mood in Early Latin: A Dissertation, Press of the New Era Printing Company.
- (1920). An Economic History of Rome to the End of the Republic, Johns Hopkins University Press [rev. ed. 1927].
- (1922). Vergil, a Biography, Henry Holt & Company [Russell & Russell, 1965].
- (1923). A History of Rome, Henry Holt & Company.
- (1924). "Latin Quantitative Speech as Affected by Immigration". The American Journal of Philology, Vol. 45, No. 2 (1924), pp. 161–175.
- (1924). Roman Buildings of the Republic, American Academy in Rome.
- (1928). Catullus and Horace, Henry Holt & Company [Russell & Russell, 1965].
- (1930). Life and Literature in the Roman Republic, Sather Classical Lectures, University of California Press, Sixth Printing, 1971.
- (1932). Aspects of Social Behavior in Ancient Rome, Harvard University Press [Cooper Square Publishers, 1969].
- (1933 & 1940). An Economic Survey of Ancient Rome, Johns Hopkins University Press.
  - Vol. I: Rome and Italy of the Republic.
  - Vol. V: Rome and Italy of the Empire.

Other

- Frank, Tenney (1914). Roman Imperialism – via Wikisource.
