= Isabel Maddison =

British mathematician (1869–1950)

Ada Isabel Maddison
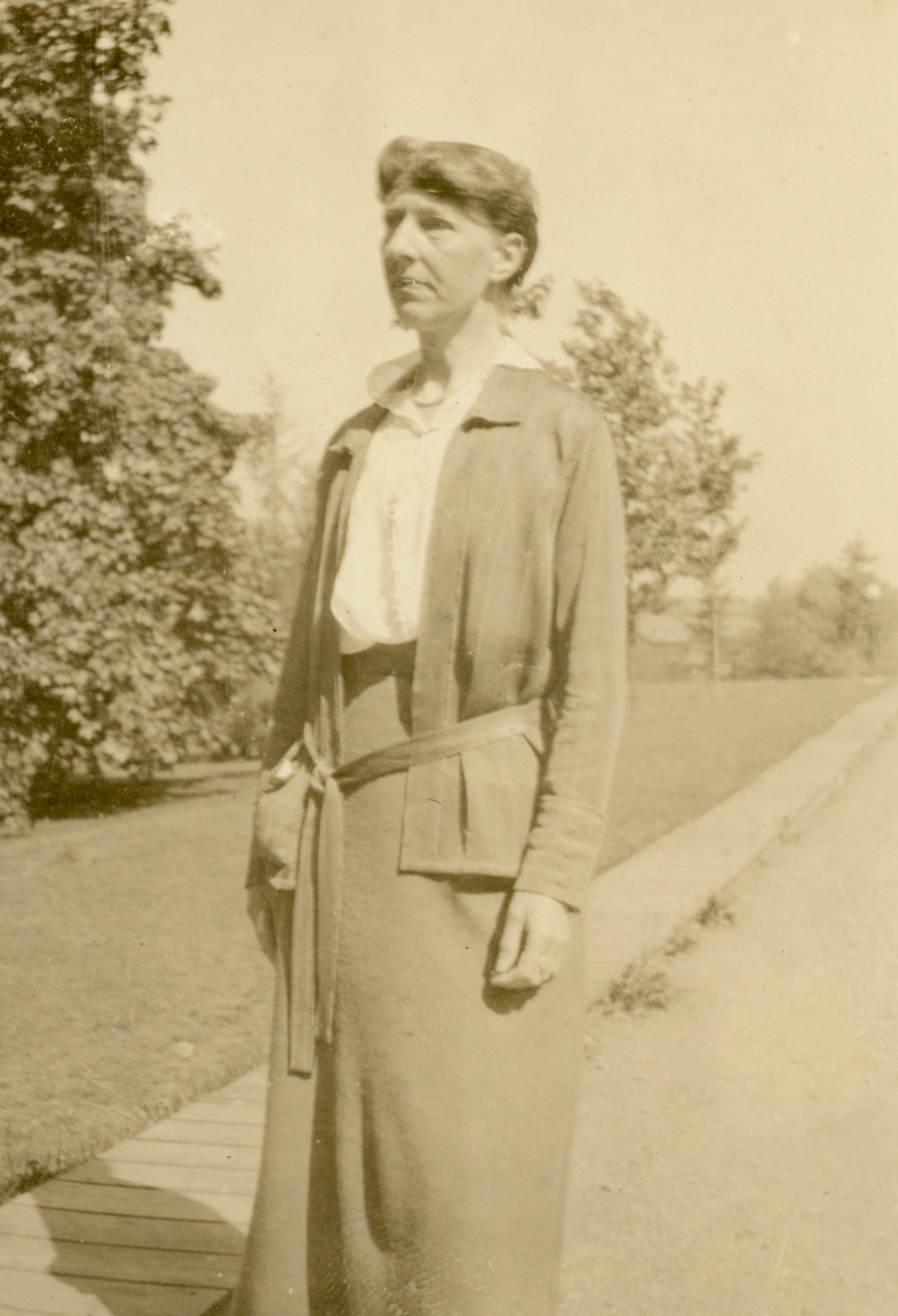
- Isabel Maddison, c. 1920
- Born: 12 April 1869; Cumberland, England
- Died: 22 October 1950 (aged 81); Pennsylvania, US
- Education: Bryn Mawr
- Known for: differential equations
- Scientific career
- Fields: Mathematics
- Workplaces: Bryn Mawr
- Thesis: On Singular Solutions of Differential Equations of the First Order in Two Variables and the Geometrical Properties of Certain Invariants and Covariants of Their Complete Primitives (1896)
- Doctoral advisor: Charlotte Scott

Ada Isabel Maddison (12 April 1869 – 22 October 1950) was a British mathematician best known for her work on differential equations.

== Education ==
Isabel Maddison entered University College in Cardiff in 1885. She was awarded a Clothworker's Guild Scholarship to study at Girton College, Cambridge, where she matriculated in 1889. A fellow student who matriculated at Girton at the same time as Maddison was Grace Chisholm (later Grace Chisholm Young). Maddison attended lectures at Cambridge by Cayley, Whitehead and Young. In 1892 Maddison passed the Cambridge Mathematical Tripos Exam earning a First Class degree, equal to the twenty-seventh Wrangler, but she was not allowed to receive a degree, as, at this time, women could not formally receive a degree at Cambridge. Instead, she was awarded the degree of Bachelor of Science with Honors from the University of London in 1893. Her fellow student Grace Chisholm also earned a First Class degree in the same Mathematical Tripos examinations.

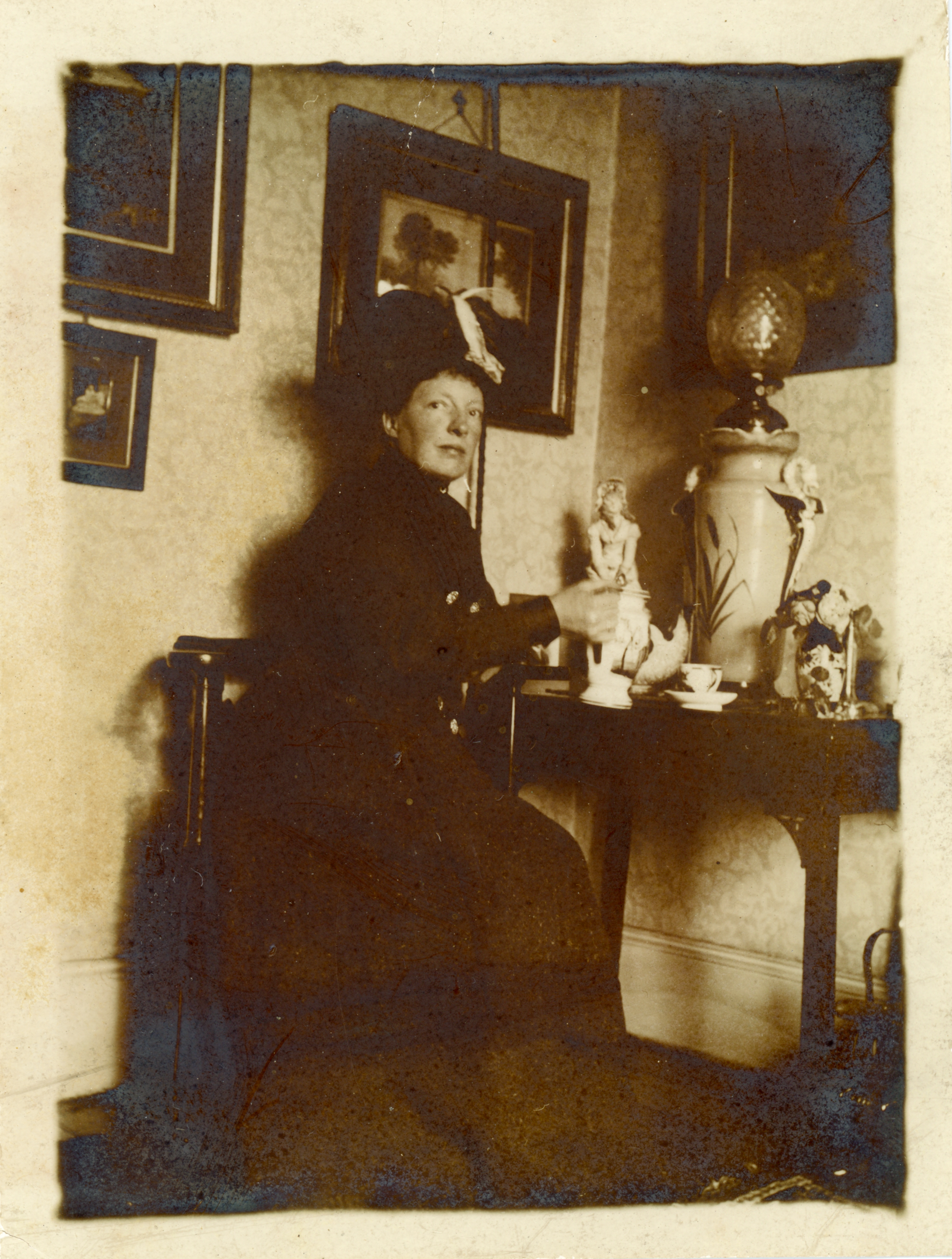
Isabel Maddison, c. 1900

On completing her studies at Cambridge, Maddison was awarded a scholarship which enabled her to spend the year 1892–93 at Bryn Mawr College in the US. There she undertook research under the direction of Charlotte Scott, the first woman to earn a First Class degree at Cambridge (in 1880). Maddison was awarded the resident mathematics fellowship, and then a Mary E. Garrett Fellowship for study abroad. She used the latter to study at the University of Göttingen in the academic year 1893–1894, where she attended lectures by Felix Klein and David Hilbert. Right before that, in 1893, Maddison sat the University of London exams, and as a result was awarded a BSc with Honors. She received her PhD from Bryn Mawr in 1896.

== Career and later life ==
Maddison had, like Scott, become interested in linear algebra through the influence of Cayley at Cambridge. When she first reached Bryn Mawr College, Maddison continued to work on this topic but later, advised by Scott, she began to work on singular solutions of differential equations. Although she had earned the equivalent of a First Class degree at Cambridge, Maddison still had no degree so she took the external examinations of the University of London in 1893 which allowed her to graduate with a BSc with honours. Bryn Mawr College awarded her their Residential Mathematical Fellowship which funded her studies for the year 1893–94. She was next awarded the Mary E. Garrett European Fellowship, which enabled her to spend 1894–95 at Göttingen in Germany. There she met again Grace Chisholm, who was studying for her doctorate under Klein. Maddison attended lectures by Klein, Hilbert, and Burkhardt during her year at Göttingen where she played a full part in the exciting mathematical atmosphere of the department.

She continued working at Bryn Mawr, where she taught as well as doing time-consuming administrative work.

In 1895, Maddison returned to Bryn Mawr College to take up the position of assistant to the president of the college, M. Carey Thomas. Until 1902, M. Carey Thomas held both the position of dean and of president, so Maddison had a busy life as her assistant. It was a position which took up so much of her time that she was unable to continue with mathematical research, but she did complete her doctorate under Scott's supervision.

She was awarded a PhD in 1896 for her thesis On Singular Solutions of Differential Equations of the First Order in Two Variables and the Geometrical Properties of Certain Invariants and Covariants of Their Complete Primitives and in the same year appointed as Reader in Mathematics at Bryn Mawr. Her paper On certain factors of c- and p-discriminants and their relations to fixed points in the family of curves which she published in the Journal of Pure and Applied Mathematics was based on her doctoral dissertation and she was awarded the Gambel Prize. She also published an English translation of Klein's address in the Bulletin of the American Mathematical Society in 1896 and in the Bulletin of 1897 a Note on the History of the Map Coloring Problem.

In 1904, she was appointed both associate professor and assistant to the president. Her will endowed $10,000 in memory of President M. Carey Thomas to be used as a pension fund for Bryn Mawr's administrative staff. She has also put together a thorough listing of university courses open to women at the time in British and Canadian universities. In 1897, she was elected membership to the American Mathematical Society as well as a life member of the London Mathematical Society. She was also a member of the Daughters of the British Empire.

Maddison remained at Bryn Mawr until she retired in 1926.

After Maddison retired she returned to England for a time, but later went back to Pennsylvania, where she spent time writing poetry rather than mathematics. Her will gave a large sum of money in the memory of M. Carey Thomas, who died in 1935, to be used as pension funds for non-faculty members of staff at Bryn Mawr. In a tribute by the board of directors after her death, she was remembered for "her natural and gentle sweetness, her love of youth, and her sensitivity."
