= Leicester Bodine Holland =

American architect (1882–1952)

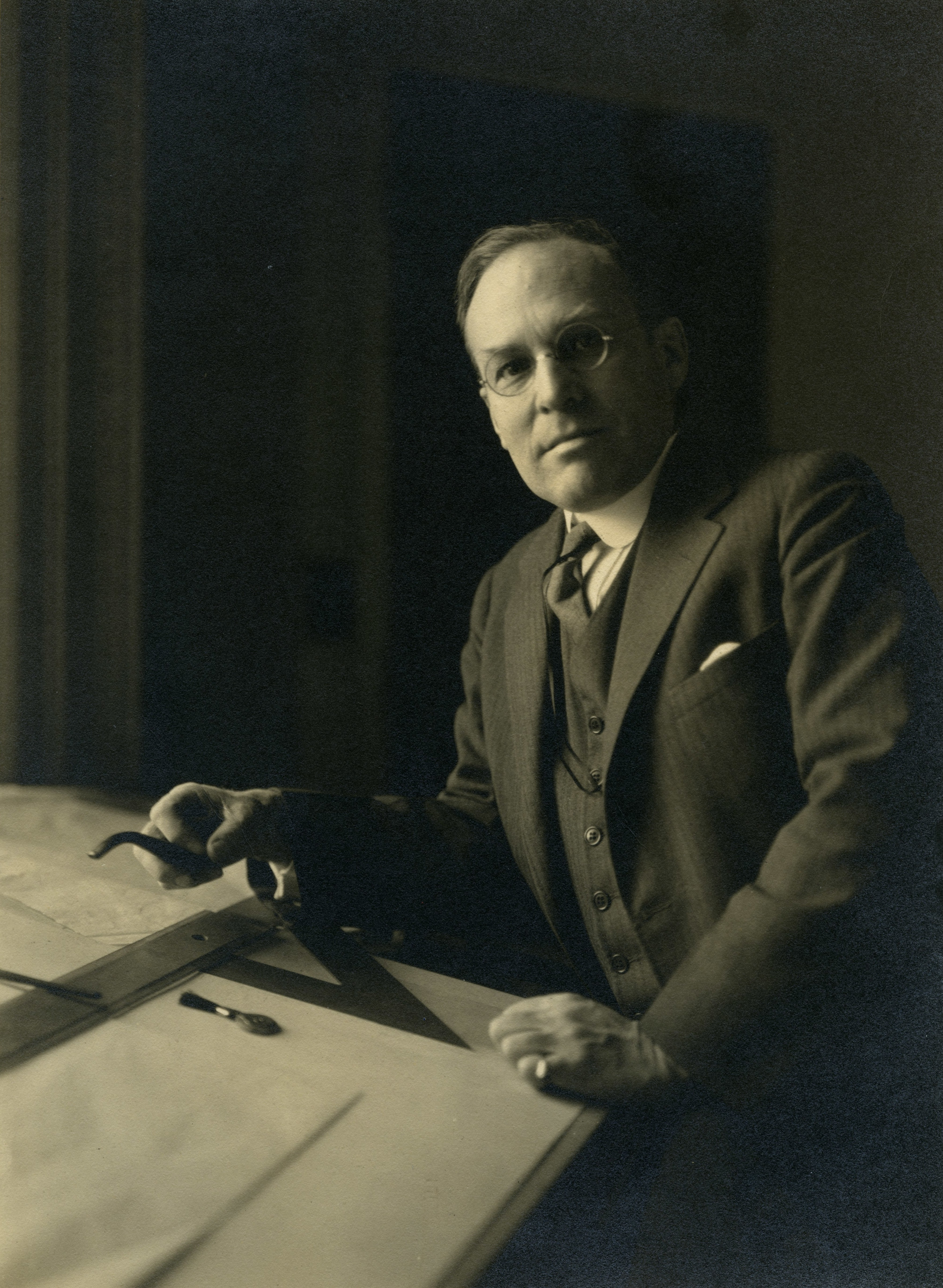
- Leicester Bodine Holland c. 1930
- Born: May 23, 1882
- Died: February 7, 1952 (aged 69)
- Occupations: architect, art historian, and archaeologist
- Spouse: Louise Holland
- Relatives: Léonie Adams (sister-in-law)

Academic background
- Education: William Penn Charter School; University of Pennsylvania

Academic work
- Discipline: Architecture
- Institutions: University of Pennsylvania; American School in Athens; Bryn Mawr College

Leicester Bodine Holland (23 May 1882 – 7 February 1952) was an American architect, art historian and archaeologist and holder of the Carnegie Chair at the Library of Congress.

== Early life and education ==
Holland was born in Louisville, Kentucky on 23 May 1882. He is the son of Dr. James W. Holland and Mary Boggs (née Rupert) Holland. His father was the Dean of the Jefferson Medical College. When Holland graduated from William Penn Charter School in Philadelphia in 1898, he originally intended to become a doctor. Instead, however, he went into architecture. After he received a Bachelor of Science degree from the University of Pennsylvania in 1902, he gained a secondary Bachelor of Science degree in Architecture in 1904. Later, he received his M.A. in 1917 and his Ph.D. in 1919, all from the University of Pennsylvania.

== Career ==
Holland trained in architecture with Wilson Eyre in Philadelphia and with Cram, Goodhue & Ferguson of Boston. By 1907 he had set up the partnership of Howell & Holland with Carl Howell, a partnership which lasted until 1912. From then on Holland became interested in archaeology, and eventually he left architecture to follow this interest. From 1913 to 1946 he was a member of the Faculty of the University of Pennsylvania serving as Associate Professor of Architecture (1922–23) and later served as Chief of the Division of Fine Arts and holder of the Carnegie Chair at the Library of Congress. In 1923 he married the academic and archaeologist Louise Holland (1893–1990) and their daughter Barbara Adams Holland was born in 1925. A second daughter, Marian Rupert Holland, was born in 1927 while their son Lawrence Rozier Holland was born in 1930. His sister-in-law was the United States Poet Laureate Léonie Adams. From 1945 to 1946 he was a lecturer in Classical Archaeology at Bryn Mawr College and from 1946 to 1947 an architect with the Corinth excavations of the American School in Athens.

Holland had joined the American Institute of Architecture (AIA) in 1913 and in 1920 became a Fellow of the Institute. He was also a member of the Philadelphia Sketch Club and of the Archaeological Institute of America. He was elected a member of the American Philosophical Society in 1931. He was well known during his lifetime for his book The Garden Bluebook: A Manual of the Perennial Garden (first published in 1915, with later editions), which "advised amateur gardeners and those working in the newly professionalized field of landscape architecture to think of their herbaceous borders as a series of pictures changing month by month." With Harry Parker he wrote Ready-Written Specifications: A Compendium of Clauses for Direct Use in Architectural Specifications (John Wiley & Sons, Inc., New York, 1926). The Leicester B. Holland Prize is awarded annually by the Historic American Buildings Survey (HABS) in recognition of the best single-sheet measured drawing of an historic building, site, or structure.
