= Bryn Mawr Film Institute =

- Seville Theatre
- U.S. National Register of Historic Places
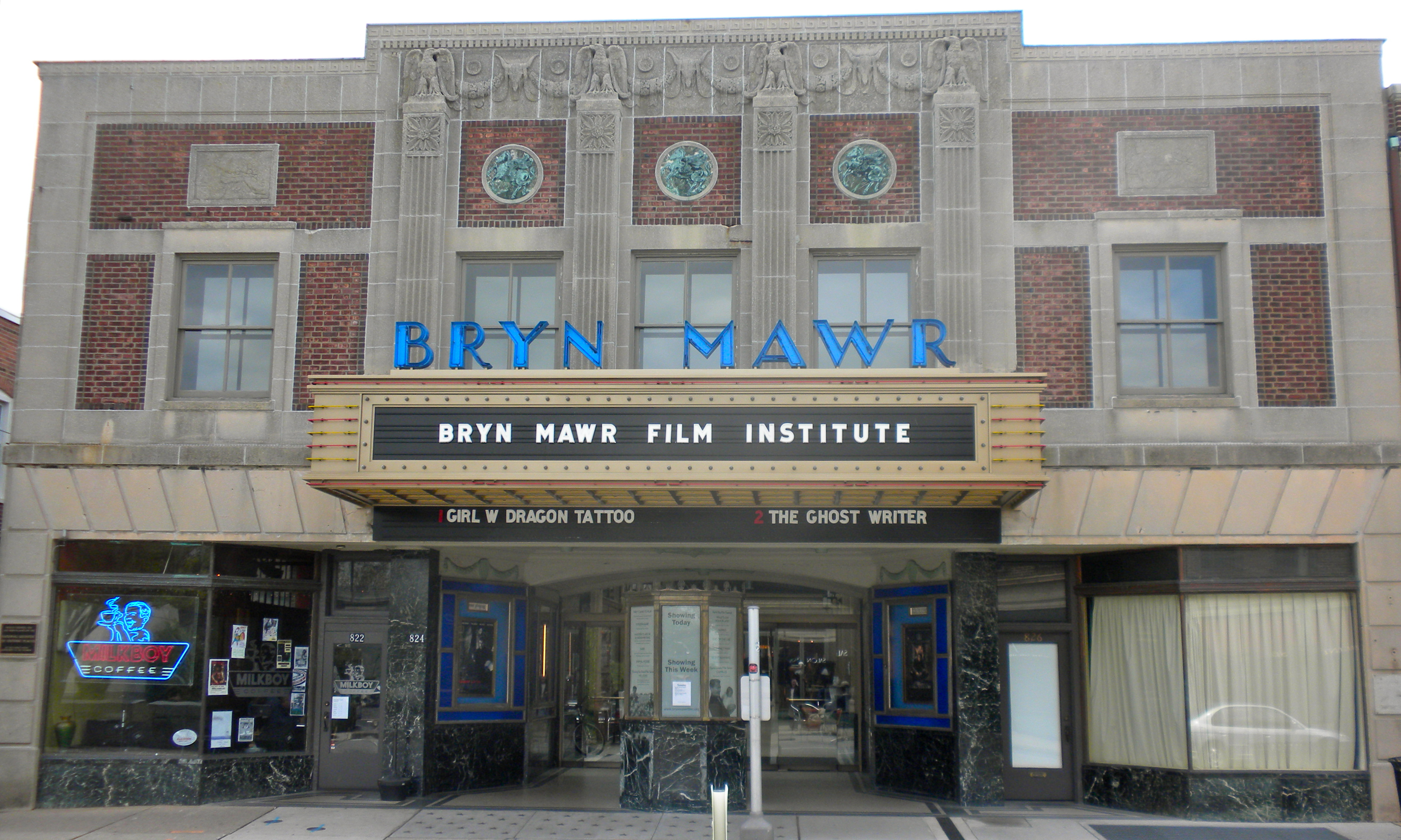

- Location within Pennsylvania Location within the United States
- Location: 822-826 W. Lancaster Ave., Lower Merion Township, Pennsylvania, U.S.
- Coordinates: 40°1′24″N 75°19′8″W
- Area: less than one acre
- Built: 1926
- Architect: Lee, William H.
- Architectural style: Beaux Arts
- NRHP reference No.: 05001491
- Added to NRHP: December 28, 2005

Bryn Mawr Film Institute is a non-profit, community-supported movie theater located in Bryn Mawr, Pennsylvania, a town on Philadelphia's Main Line. It re-opened in March 2005, with Ben Kingsley present, and currently has over 9,100 supporting members. BMFI shows a wide range of films, including foreign, independent and art house films. Film education is an integral part of the theater's mission; BMFI works with area schools and also offers film studies courses for adults.

BMFI also offers film discussions, a summer filmmaking workshop for High Schoolers, and open screen Mondays featuring films from area filmmakers, and also offers community partnerships that provide benefits to participating organizations.

== History of the theater ==
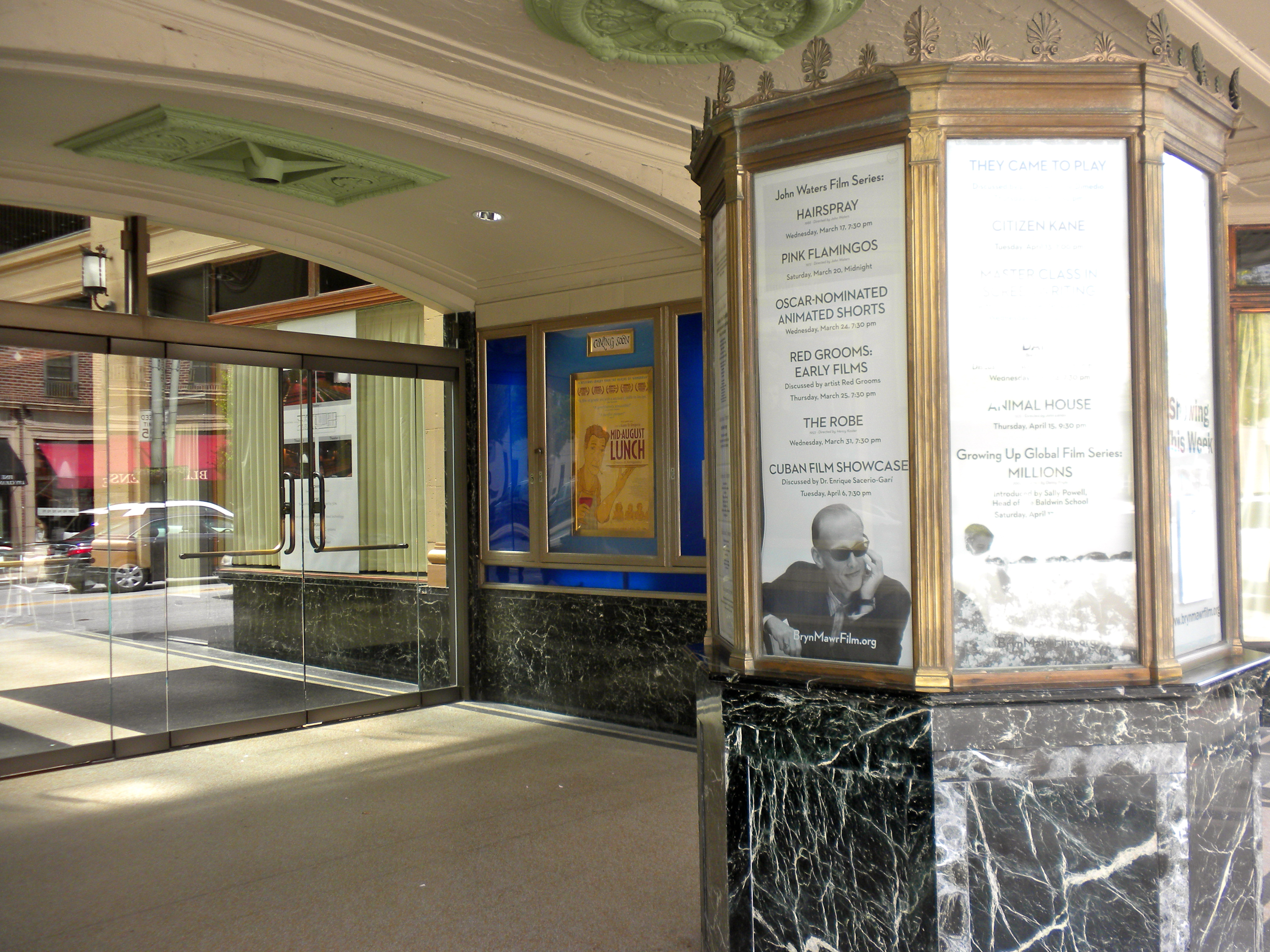
Entrance

The building began life as the Seville Theater. It was designed by Philadelphia architect William Harold Lee, a designer of over 200 theaters. The Seville was built in 1926, one of six theaters built along the Main Line in the 1920s. Originally a one-screen theater, it was later split into two during the 1980s.

In 2002, after the national chain that owned the Seville Theater declared bankruptcy, Juliet Goodfriend, who became the founding president and executive director, led the effort to save the theater. After many fundraising events and zoning appeals, the theater was purchased in 2004 by the Bryn Mawr Film Institute (the name of the group founded in 2002 by academic, business and civic leaders from the area).

== Goals ==
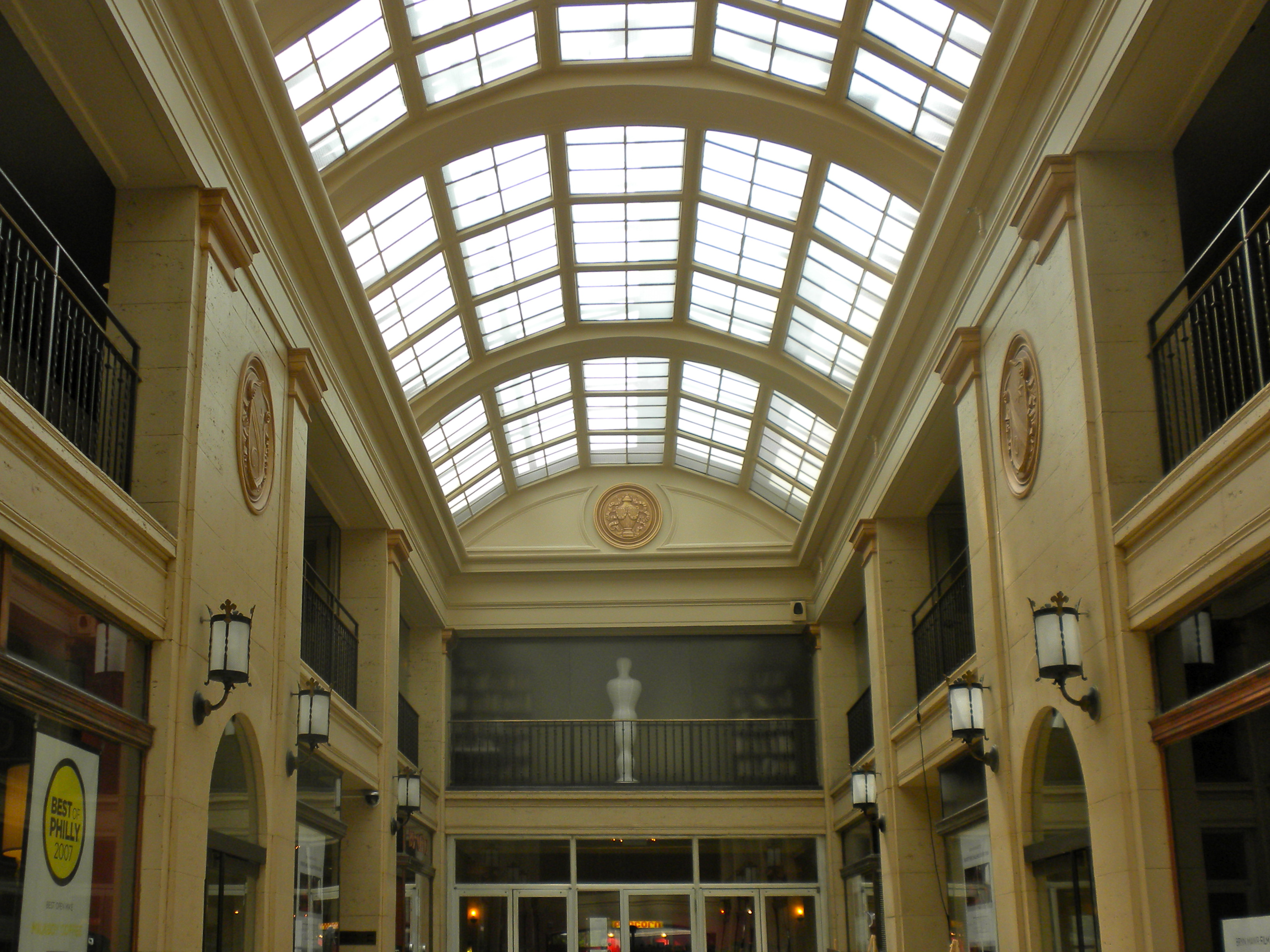
Atrium

A three-phase restoration of the theater began soon after BMFI purchased it. Phase 1 included refurbishing the lobby, installing new production and sound equipment, modernizing the electrical and heating systems and building a new café. Phase 1 was completed in March 2006 with the installation of the new marquee. Approximately $9 million was raised to complete the theater's transformation.

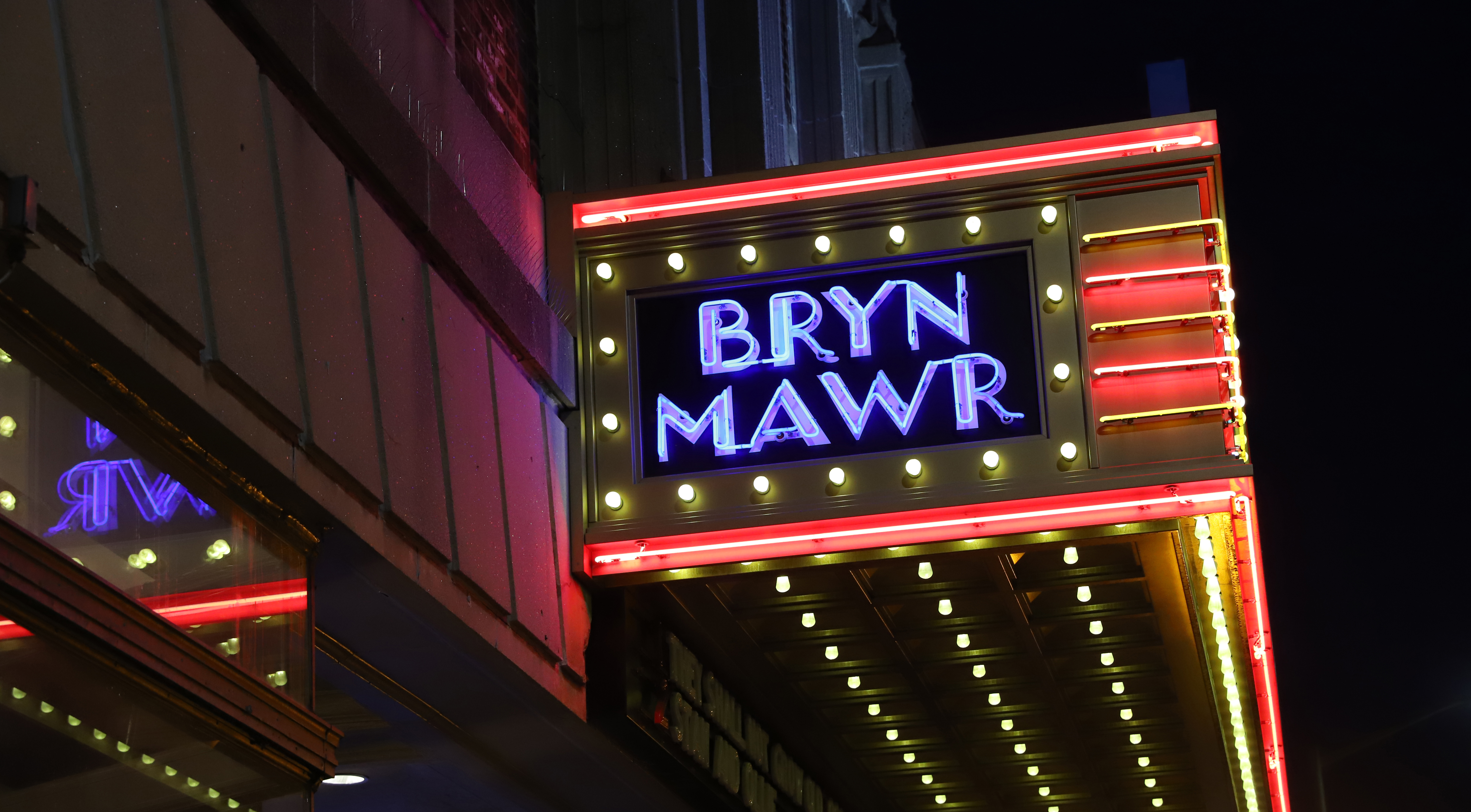
The new marquee at BMFI

During Phase II, the Institute finished the restoration of the skylit atrium to its original state, at a cost of $2 million, in March 2009. Other upgrades include classroom space and an elevator. Phase III introduced two additional state-of-the art theaters, and the two previously existing theaters were also renovated.

On April 27, 2014, the completion of the 10 million dollar renovation project was celebrated.

== Leadership ==
BMFI was led by its founder and president, Juliet Goodfriend, until April 2017, at which point she stepped down and assumed the role of Chair of the Board. Samuel Scott, formerly the Chairman, became Executive Director, and at present is still in that role as well as being CEO.

The Board of Directors of the BMFI is composed of film experts, influential members of the community, leaders, and philanthropists:

Board Leadership:

- Lyn Wiesinger, Board Chair
- Samuel R. Scott, Executive Director/CEO
- Christopher Carey, Vice Chair
- Michael W. Harrington, Treasurer
- David B. Pudlin, Secretary

Directors:

- Jane Corrigan
- Scott Fisher
- Harry Groome
- Joanne Harmelin
- Martha Morse
- Ted Peters
- Hon. Gene E.K. Pratter
- Faézé Woodville
- Bernadette Wheeler

Special Representatives and Ex Officio Members:

- Hon. Amanda M. Cappelletti, Pennsylvania State Senator
- Hon. Greg Vitali, Ex Officio, Pennsylvania State Representative
- Hon. V. Scott Zelov, Ex Officio, Lower Merion Township Commissioner

Honorary Members:

- Juliet J. Goodfriend, Founder and Chair Emerita
- Sir Ben Kingsley, Actor
- Robert Osborne, Film historian and host of Turner Classic Movies (Deceased)
