= Gladwyne, Pennsylvania =

Unincorporated community in Pennsylvania, US

Gladwyne
- Unincorporated community
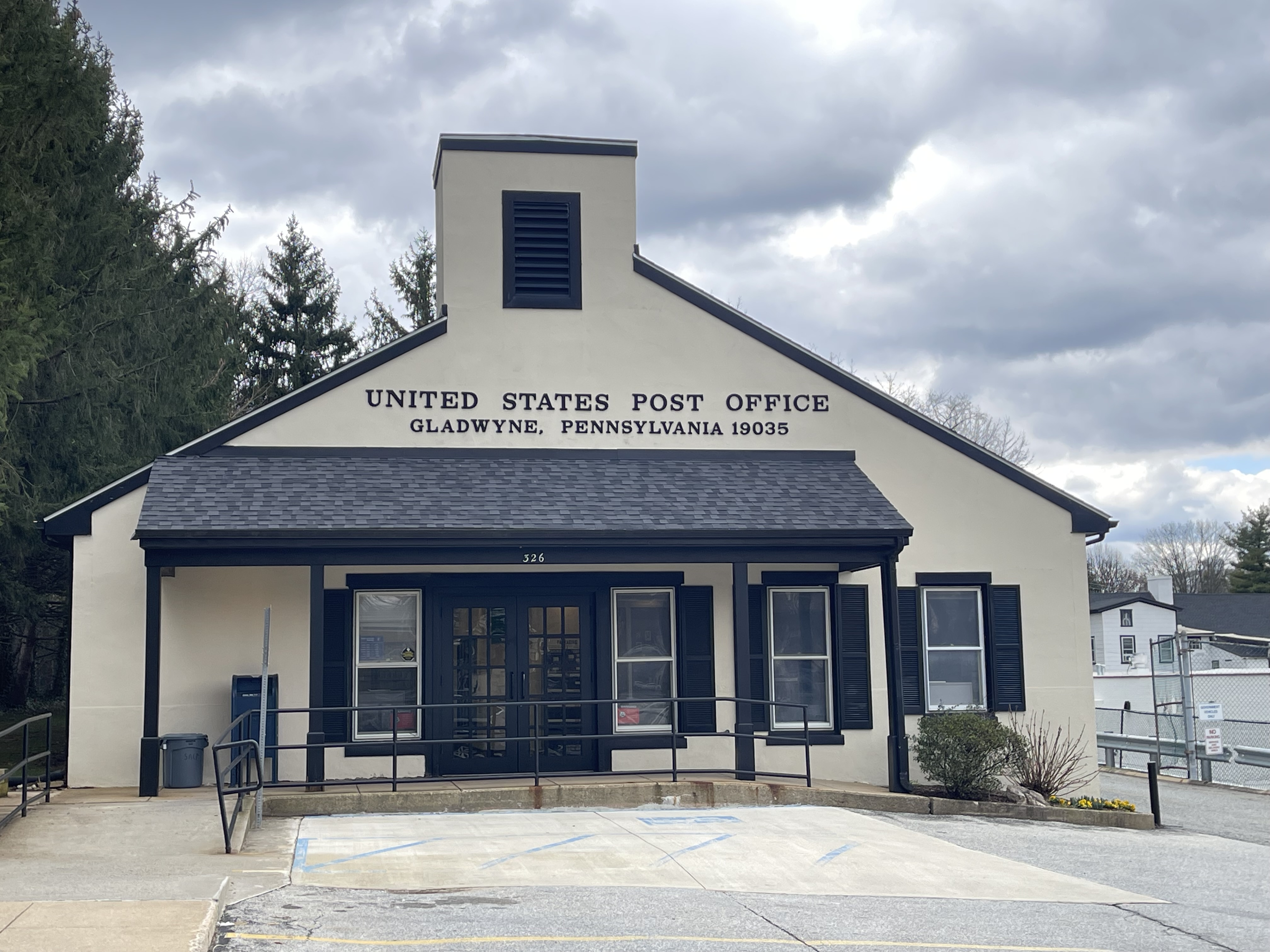
- Gladwyne post office

- Location of Gladwyne in Pennsylvania Gladwyne (the United States)
- Coordinates: 40°2′N 75°17′W
- Country: United States
- State: Pennsylvania
- County: Montgomery
- Township: Lower Merion

Area
  - Total: 4.9 sq mi (13 km^{2})
  - Land: 4.9 sq mi (13 km^{2})
  - Water: 0.0 sq mi (0 km^{2})
- Elevation: 338 ft (103 m)

Population (2020)
  - Total: 4,096
  - Density: 840/sq mi (320/km^{2})
- Time zone: UTC-5 (EST)
  - Summer (DST): UTC-4 (EDT)
- ZIP Code: 19035
- Area codes: 610 and 484

Gladwyne is a suburban community in Lower Merion Township, Montgomery County, Pennsylvania. In 2018, Gladwyne was ranked the sixth richest ZIP Code (using 2015 IRS data) in the country in a study by Bloomberg BusinessWeek. The population was 4,096 at the 2020 US census. As Gladwyne is neither an incorporated area nor a census-designated place, all data are for the ZIP Code 19035, with which the community is coterminous.

There are four churches, a synagogue, a library, two schools, the Gladwyne fire company, the Gladwyne Civic Association, the Stony Lane Swim Club, playgrounds, parks, businesses, and retail shops within the confines of Gladwyne. The historic Guard House Inn is also located within Gladwyne. The village is also home to the Philadelphia Country Club on its periphery, Merion Cricket Club, and to The Courts, a private tennis club. Because the town was early to preserve space and has received many donations of land, developers have not subdivided the area into more typical suburban developments, so the area retains a mixture of farm, colonial town, and late 19th/early 20th housing uncharacteristic of the general surrounding area.

Banker James Crosby Brown of Brown Brothers & Co. built a 185-acre (0.75 km^{2}) estate that later was divided into non-divisible (deed-restricted) lots of three to 17 acres (6.9 ha), an early act of (partial) preservation that set an important precedent for future acts by both individuals and the township. The Lower Merion Conservancy plays a significant role in protecting the local heritage and maintains its office in Gladwyne's Rolling Hill Park.

== History ==
Like the rest of the region, Gladwyne, known until 1891 as "Merion Square", originally was settled by Welsh Quakers beginning in 1682. It was given its new name to lessen confusion with the many "Merions" in the area, including the town of Merion, Lower Merion Township, and Upper Merion Township, and in imitation of the Welsh names of adjoining towns, although its new name was meaningless in Welsh. Twenty-four mills operated along Mill Creek through the beginning of the twentieth century, and the major road through residential Gladwyne runs along the banks of the creek. After the American Civil War and following construction of the Pennsylvania Railroad's Main Line west from Center City, wealthy Philadelphians located many of their summer homes there.

The development of the Schuylkill Expressway (I-76) in the 1960s and the subsequent development of King of Prussia as a major business center increased Gladwyne's appeal. The Gladwyne Elementary School was built in 1958 to accommodate the children of these new residents and the Gladwyne Free Library (part of the Lower Merion Library System) was renovated and expanded as well. Yet the core of the village, built originally at the convergence of Youngsford and Righter's Mill Roads during the latter part of the eighteenth century, remained essentially the same, allowing Gladwyne to retain all of its original historic character and at the same time enjoy the conveniences of modern suburban living, such as a centrally located supermarket with ample parking, pharmacy, tavern, and restaurants.

The Gladwyne Historic District was added to the National Register of Historic Places in 1980.

== Geography ==
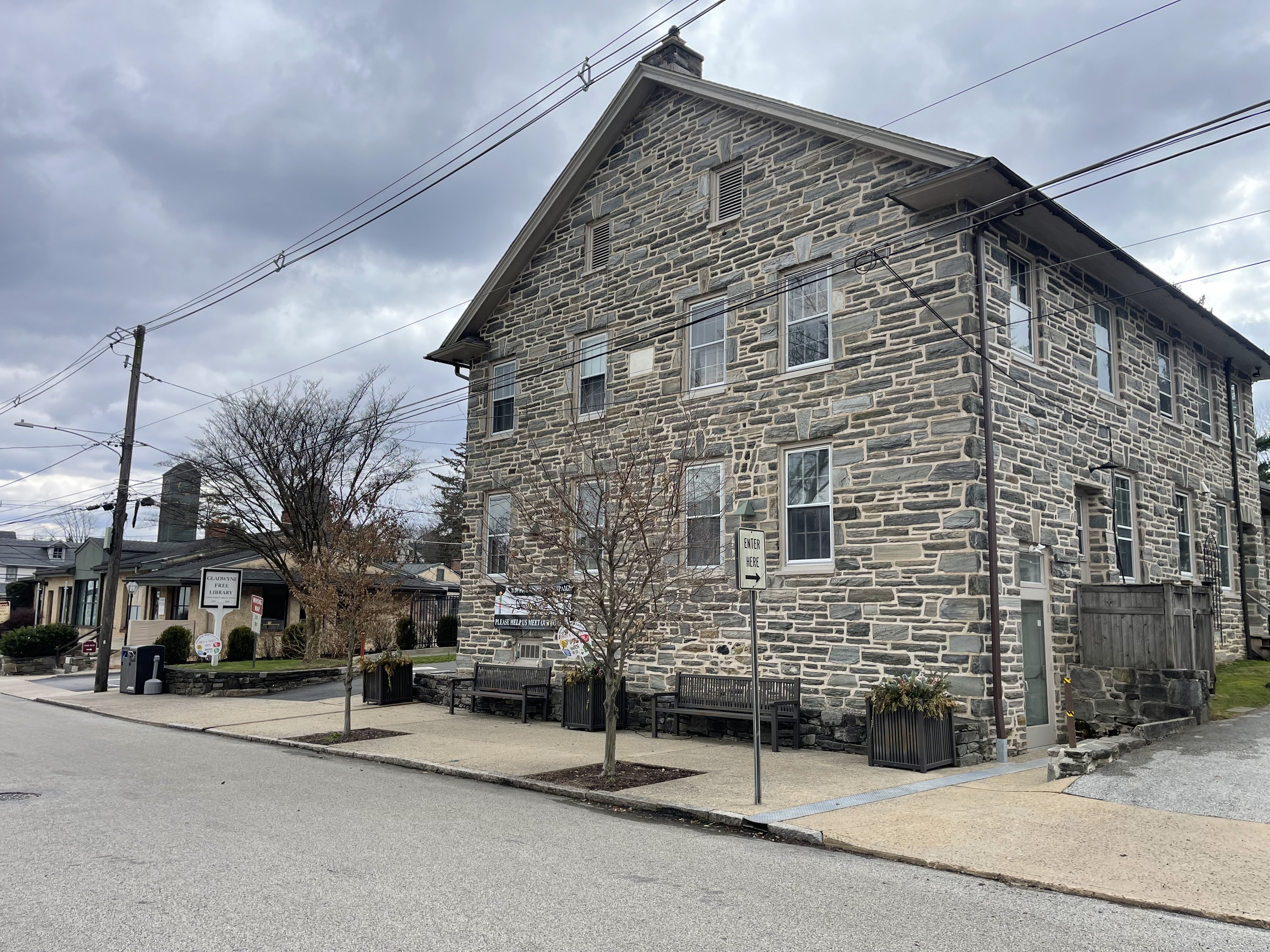
Gladwyne Public Library, part of the Lower Merion Library System.

According to the United States Census Bureau, the community has a total area of 4.9 square miles (12.8 km^{2}), all land. It is primarily rolling hills in topography.

== Demographics ==
As of the census of 2000, there were 4,050 people, 1,476 households, and 1,057 families residing in the community. The population density was 820.0 inhabitants per square mile (316.6/km^{2}). There were 1,538 housing units at an average density of 311.4 per square mile (120.2/km^{2}). The racial makeup of the village was 97.22% Caucasian, 2.34% Asian, 0.77% African American, 0.32% from other races, and 0.69% from two or more races. 1.09% of the population were Hispanic or Latino of any race.

There were 1,476 households, out of which 32.2% had children under the age of 18 living with them, 67.3% were married couples living together, 4.9% had a female householder with no husband present, and 26.4% were non-families. 22.8% of all households were made up of individuals, and 16.9% had someone living alone who was 65 years of age or older. The average household size was 2.53 and the average family size was 3.98.

In the community, the population was spread out, with 22.8% under the age of 18, 2.0% from 18 to 24, 18.9% from 25 to 44, 28.1% from 45 to 64, and 28.2% who were 65 years of age or older. The median age was 48.8 years. For every 100 females, there were 84.1 males. For every 100 females age 18 and over, there were 80.6 males.

The median income for a household in the community was more than $250,000, and the median income for a family was $407,517. Males had a median income of $100,000+ versus $51,103 for females. The per capita income for the community was $320,000. About 2.1% of families and 4.1% of the population were below the poverty line, including 1.0% of those under age 18 and 11.1% of those age 65 or over.

== Education ==
Children living in Gladwyne are zoned to schools in the Lower Merion School District unless they go to private school. They are zoned to Gladwyne Elementary School, Welsh Valley Middle School in Penn Valley and Harriton High School, located in Bryn Mawr. Gladwyne Elementary is in Gladwyne itself as is Gladwyne Montessori and the Wetherill School. There are numerous elite private schools in the area, such as Shipley School, Agnes Irwin School, Baldwin School, Haverford School, and Episcopal Academy, among others.

== Notable people ==
- Henry H. Arnold – General of the Air Force
- Richie Ashburn – MLB Hall of Famer, Philadelphia Phillies star, and longtime Phillies broadcaster. The baseball field at Gladwyne Park is named "Richie Ashburn Field" in his memory.
- Ralph L. Brinster – internationally renowned biologist, pioneer in the development of techniques for manipulating genes, National Medal of Science Laureate (2010)
- John Thompson Dorrance – chemist who invented condensed soup; president of the Campbell's from 1914 to 1930
- J. Presper Eckert – designer and patentee of the first general-purpose computer at the University of Pennsylvania
- Joel Greenberg, billionaire co-founder of Susquehanna International Group
- Allen Iverson – NBA basketball player formerly of the Philadelphia 76ers, Denver Nuggets, and Detroit Pistons
- Mark Josephson – cardiologist and writer
- Dora Khayatt – Egyptian-born painter, lived in Gladwyne for 27 years
- Kyle Korver – NBA basketball player, formerly of the Philadelphia 76ers and Atlanta Hawks. Currently a member of the Cleveland Cavaliers.
- Mitchell Lazar – chief of endocrinology/metabolism at the Hospital of the University of Pennsylvania
- Carter Merbreier – Creator and co-host (Captain Noah) of the children's television series, Captain Noah and His Magical Ark
- Patricia Merbreier – Co-host (Mrs. Noah) and puppeteer of Captain Noah and His Magical Ark
- Martin Meyerson – city planner and president of the University of Pennsylvania from 1970 to 1981
- Albert Nipon – fashion designer, clothing manufacturer, and convicted tax fraud
- Teddy Pendergrass – R&B singer
- J. Howard Pew – son of the founder of the Sun Oil Corporation, Joseph Newton Pew, and chairman of its board of directors
- Jonathan M. Raines – psychiatrist and psychoanalyst
- M. Night Shyamalan – film director
- Gil Stein - Former NHL President (1992–93), used to live in an assisted living community in Gladwyne.
- Robert Summers and Anita Summers – U.S. economists at the University of Pennsylvania and parents of former Harvard president, U.S. Treasury secretary, and Obama chief economic adviser Lawrence H. Summers
- Chase Utley – MLB player, Philadelphia Phillies
- Jerry A. Shields – physician/ophthalmologist at Wills Eye Hospital

== Points of interest ==
- 1690 House (built 1683), the oldest standing structure in Lower Merion Township, incorporating remnants of a log cabin built by John Roberts for the Roberts Mill at the convergence of Mill Creek and Old Gulph Roads
- Bridlewild Trail, a set of trails extending 22 miles (35 km) through the Henry, Rolling Hill, Idlewild Farms, Saunders Woods, and other preserved spaces. The trail is open to residents, horses, and leashed pets.
- Cedar Crest, mansion and estate of John T. Dorrance Jr. Now called "Linden Hill."
- Henry Foundation for Botanical Research, a botanical garden
- Rolling Hill Park, a 102-acre (0.41 km^{2}) park on Mill Creek, with historic mill building ruins, purchased from Walter Pew by the Lower Merion Township
- Idlewild Farm Complex, a 47-acre (19 ha) farm with buildings, donated to Natural Lands
- Saunders Woods, a 25-acre nature preserve with colonial house and barn
- Woodmont, mansion and estate of Alan Wood Jr., now a shrine to evangelist Father Divine
