= Lower Merion Library System =

Public library system

Coordinates: 40.001728°N 75.239069°W

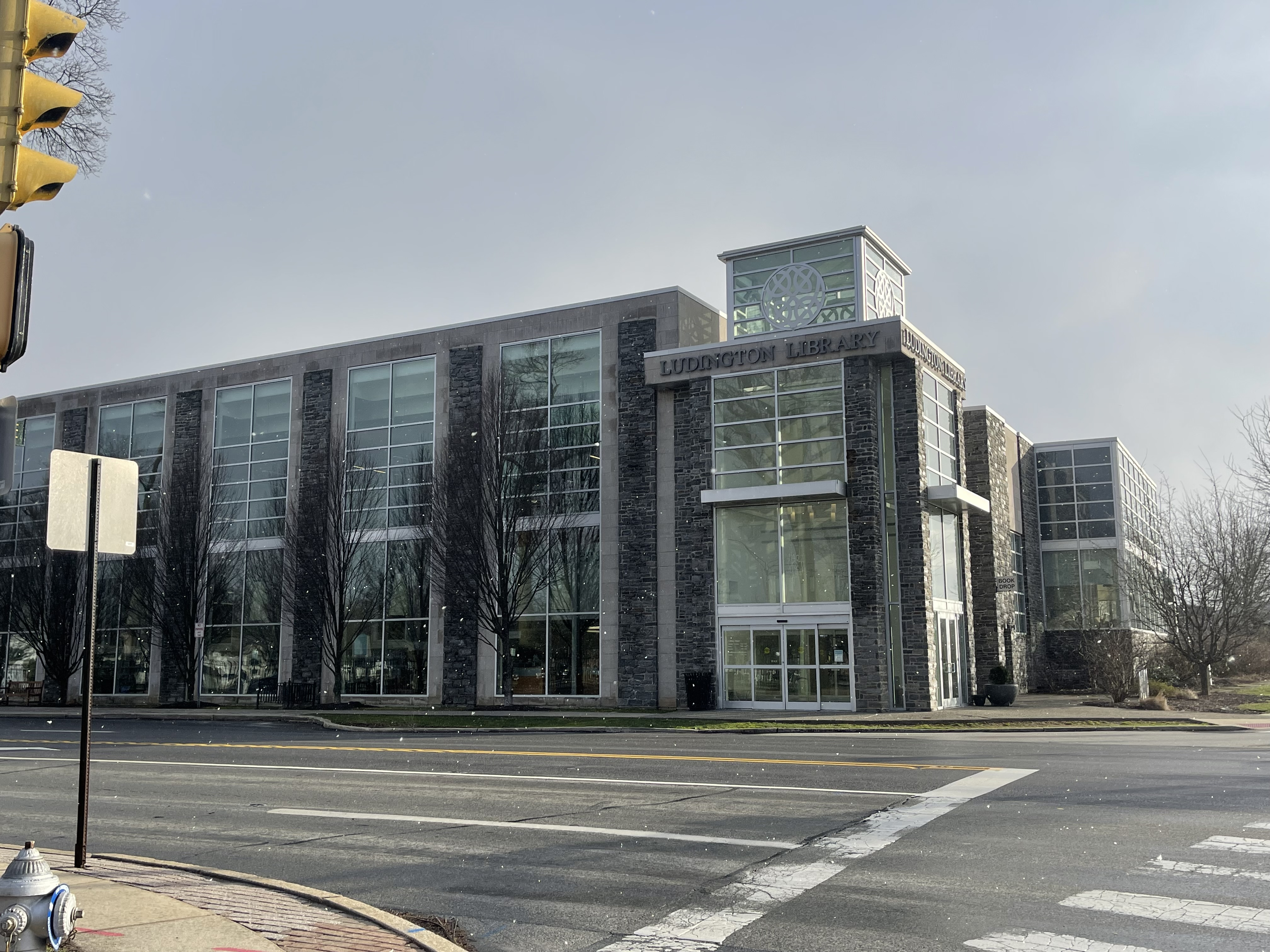
- Ludington Library in Bryn Mawr.
- Location: Lower Merion Township, Pennsylvania, U.S.
- Established: 1899
- Branches: 6

Collection
- Size: 547,656 items

Access and use
- Circulation: 1,076,000 items
- Population served: 63,000
- Members: 35,425

Other information
- Budget: $ 6,200,000
- Website: www.lmls.org

The Lower Merion Library System (LMLS) is the public library system of the township of Lower Merion, in Pennsylvania. It is among the largest public library systems in Pennsylvania.

== History ==
There are six neighborhood branches throughout the township. The first branch to open was the Ardmore Free Library in 1899, and Belmont Hills is the newest, having opened in 1935. The largest branch is the Ludington Library and the smallest branch is Belmont Hills Library. Lower Merion Library System's governing board is the Board of Directors, which consists of 11 members, some of whom serve ex-officio as commissioners on the Lower Merion Board of Commissioners.

The Lower Merion Library System is one of the independent public library systems in Montgomery County. All cardholders can borrow materials from other libraries in MCLINC (Montgomery County Library and Information Network Consortium). In addition, cardholders can use Access Pennsylvania which allows for borrowing privileges at many other library systems throughout the Commonwealth, including the Free Library of Philadelphia in neighboring Philadelphia. Lower Merion Library System cardholders can also utilize Overdrive, Kanopy, and Hoopla for e-books, magazines and video-recordings. Approximately 85% of LMLS' funding comes from Lower Merion Township, with the remainder coming from the Commonwealth of Pennsylvania and individual branch libraries' fundraising efforts.

No.	Name	Address	Zip Code	Website	Established
1	Ardmore	108 Ardmore Ave	19003	https://lmls.org/ardmore.	1899
2	Bala Cynwyd	131 Old Lancaster Road	19004	https://lmls.org/balacynwyd	1915
3	Belmont Hills	120 Mary Watersford Road	19004	https://lmls.org/belmonthills	1935
4	Gladwyne	362 Righters Mill Road	19035	https://lmls.org/gladwyne	1931
5	Ludington	5. S. Bryn Mawr Avenue	19010	https://lmls.org/ludington	1916
6	Penn Wynne	130 Overbrook Parkway	19096	https://lmls.org/pennwynne	1929

== Gallery ==
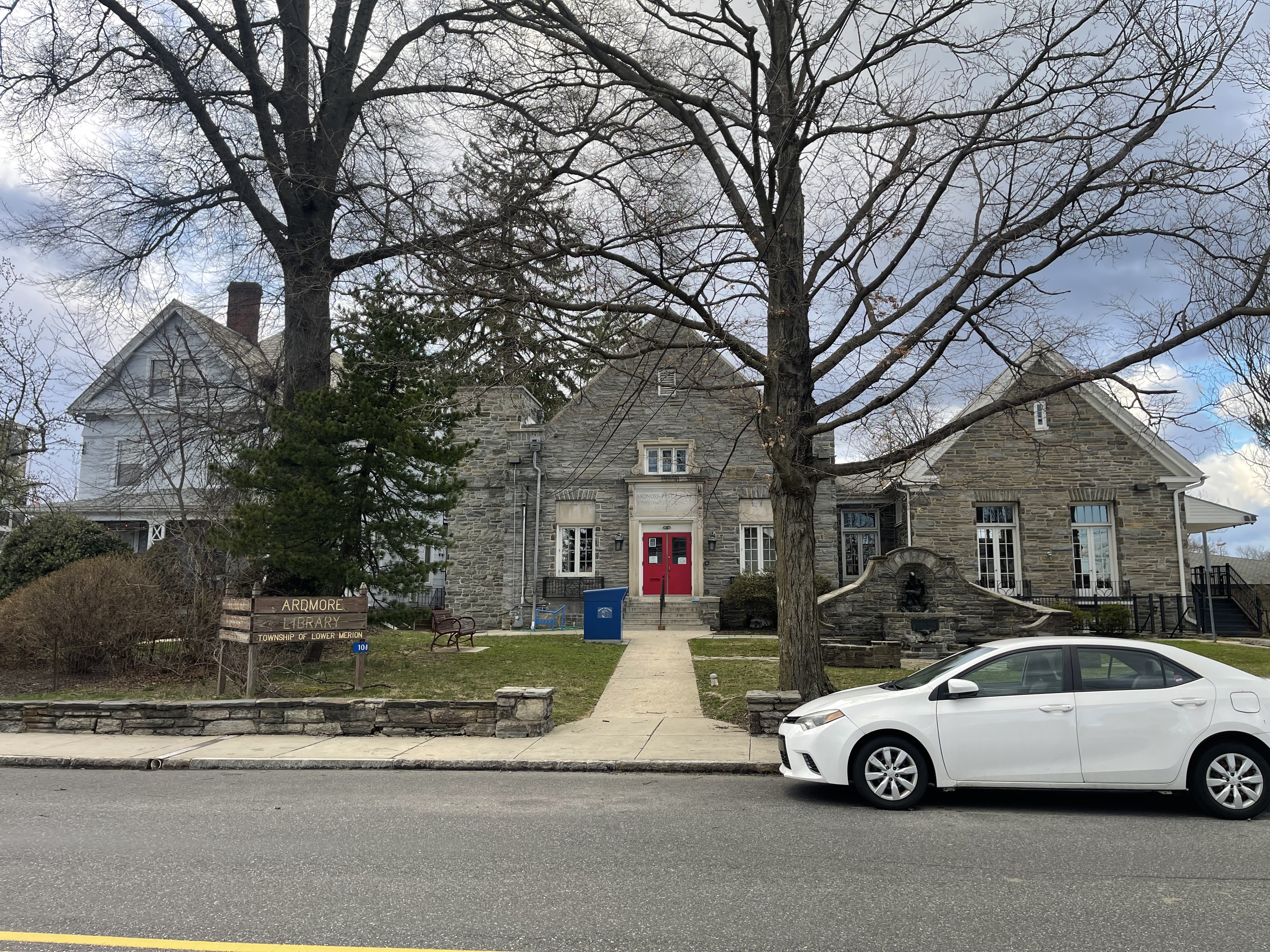
Ardmore Library

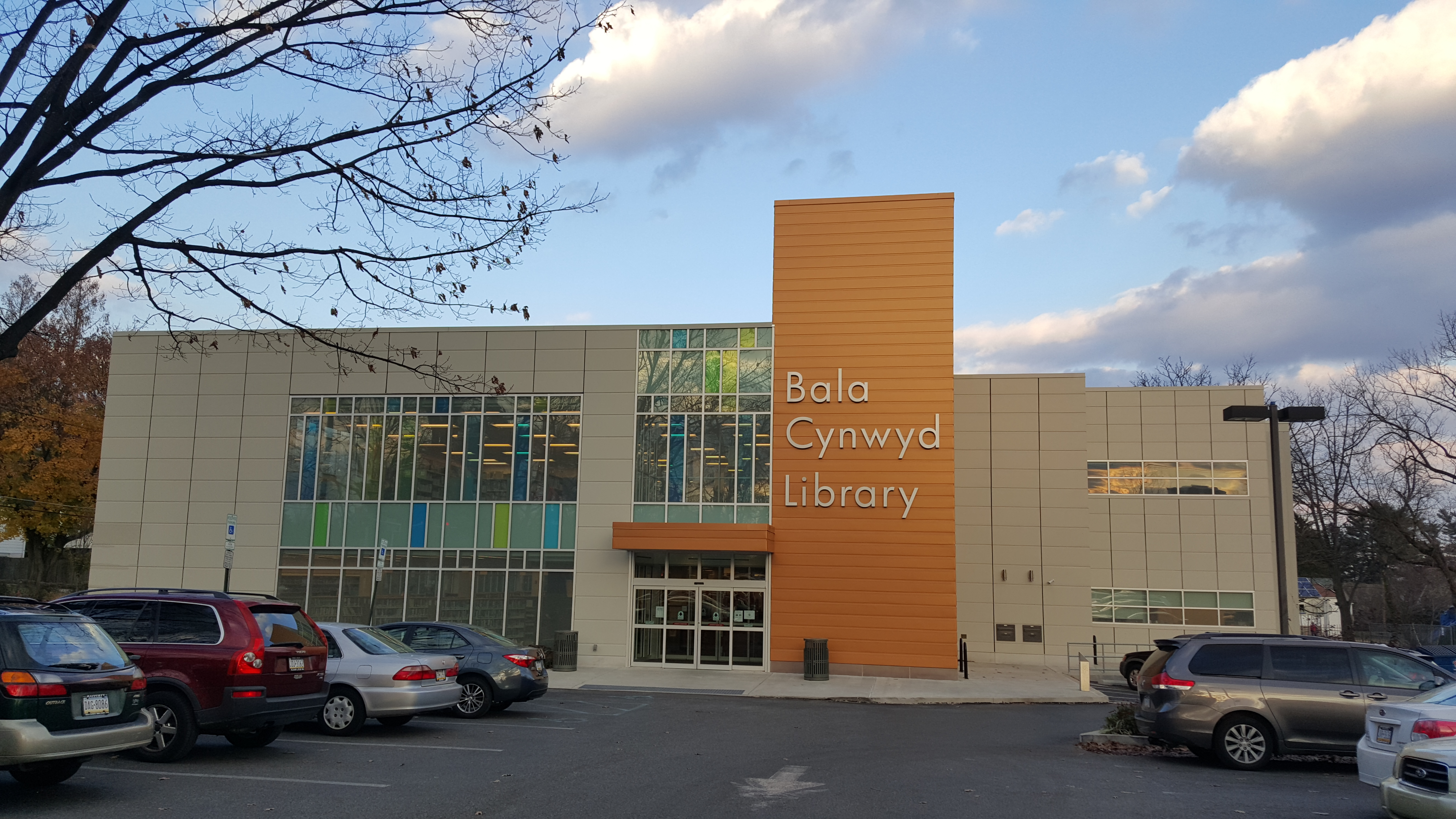
Bala Cynwyd Library

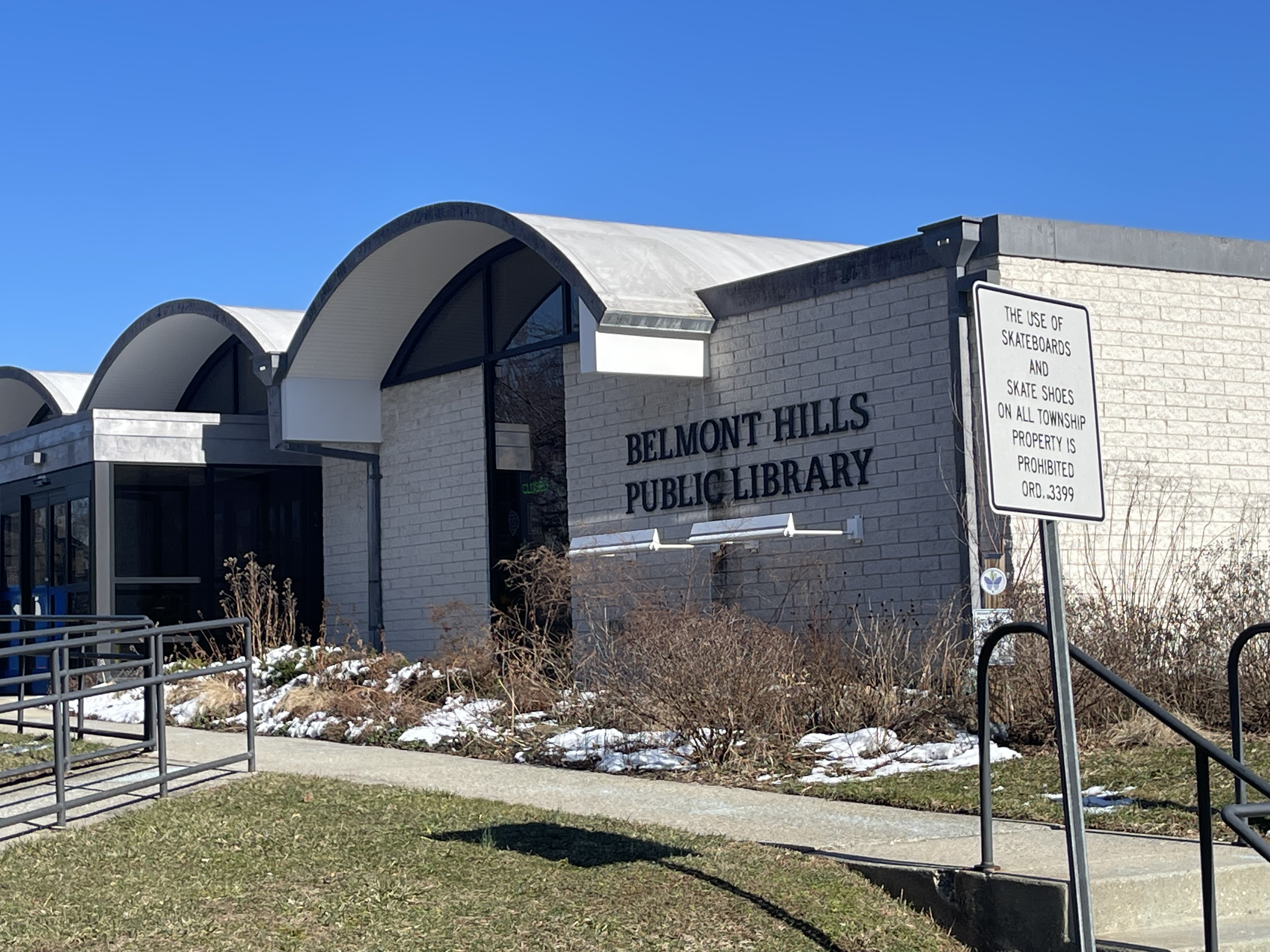
Belmont Hills Library

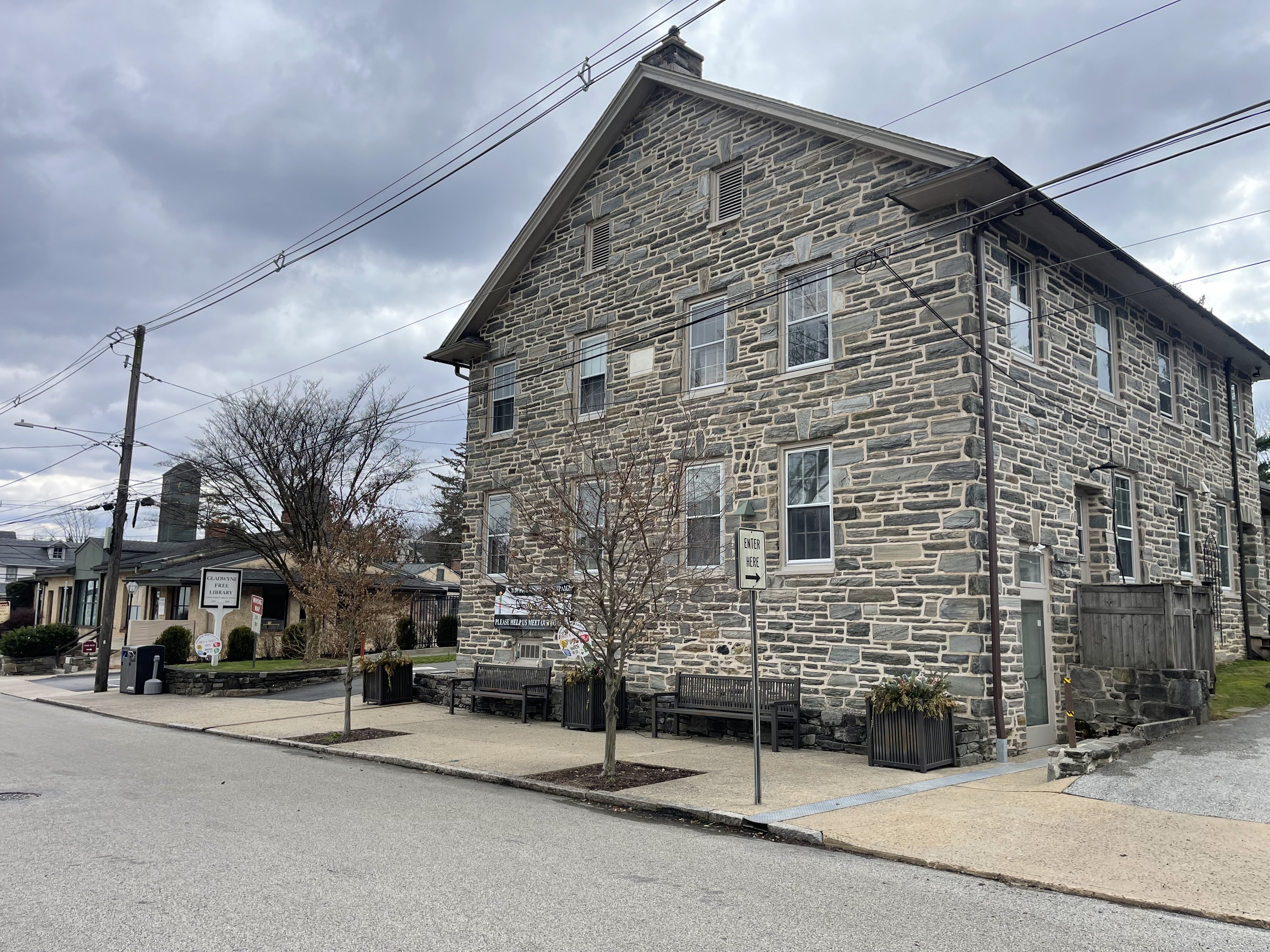
Gladwyne Library

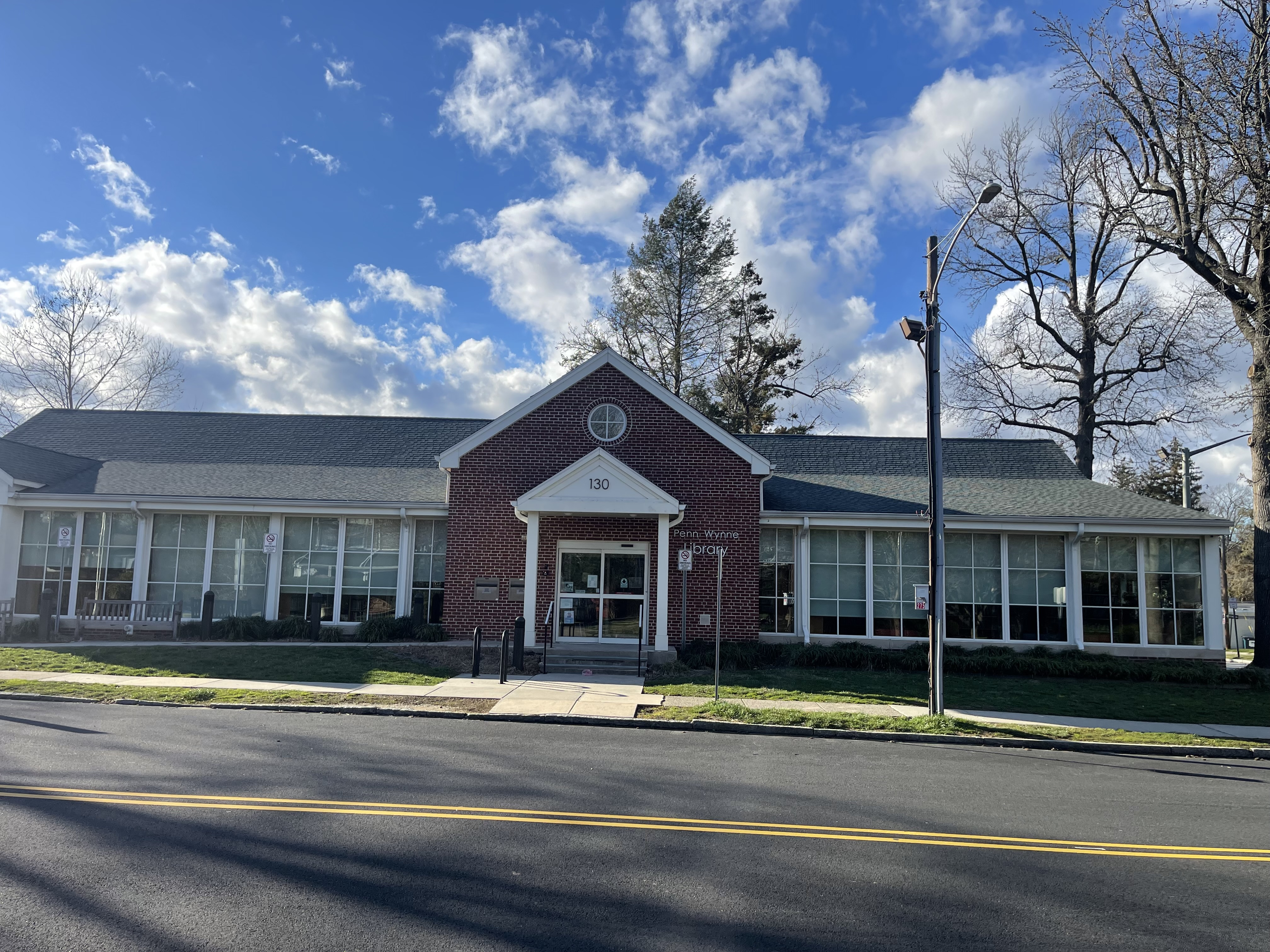
Penn Wynne Library
