= Lower Merion Township, Pennsylvania =

Township in Pennsylvania, US

Lower Merion Lower Merion Township
- Township
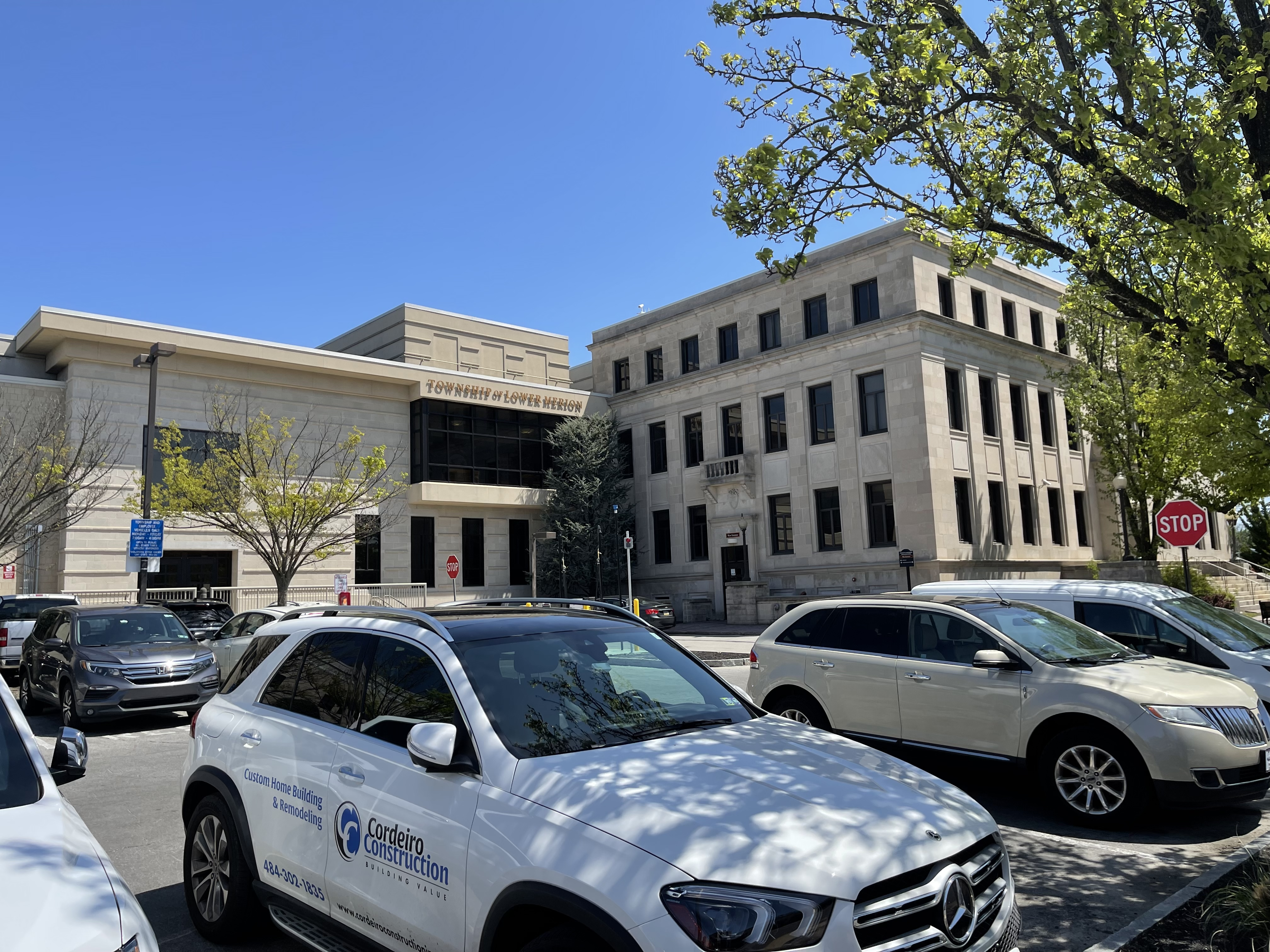
- The Lower Merion Township building in Ardmore in April 2022

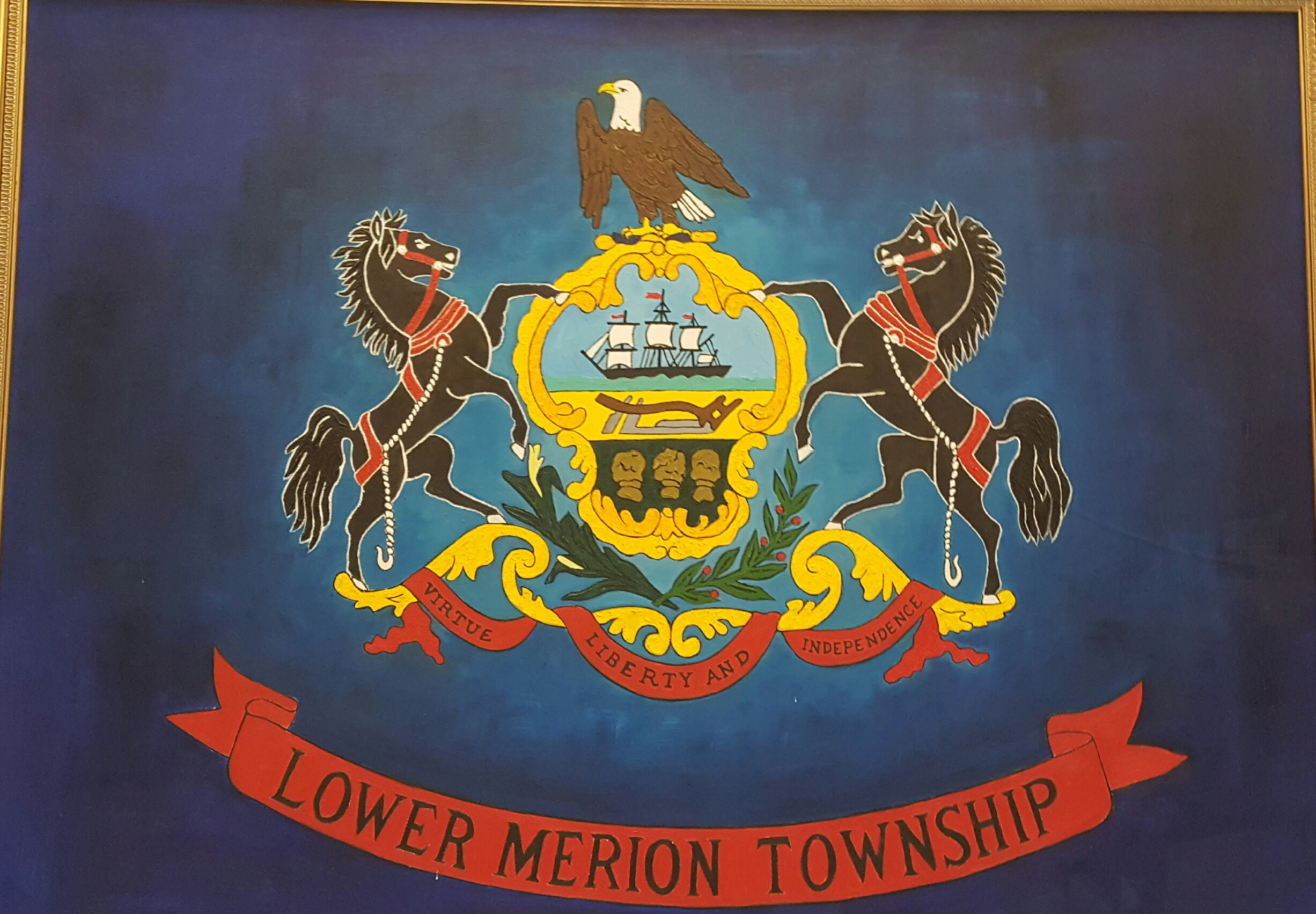
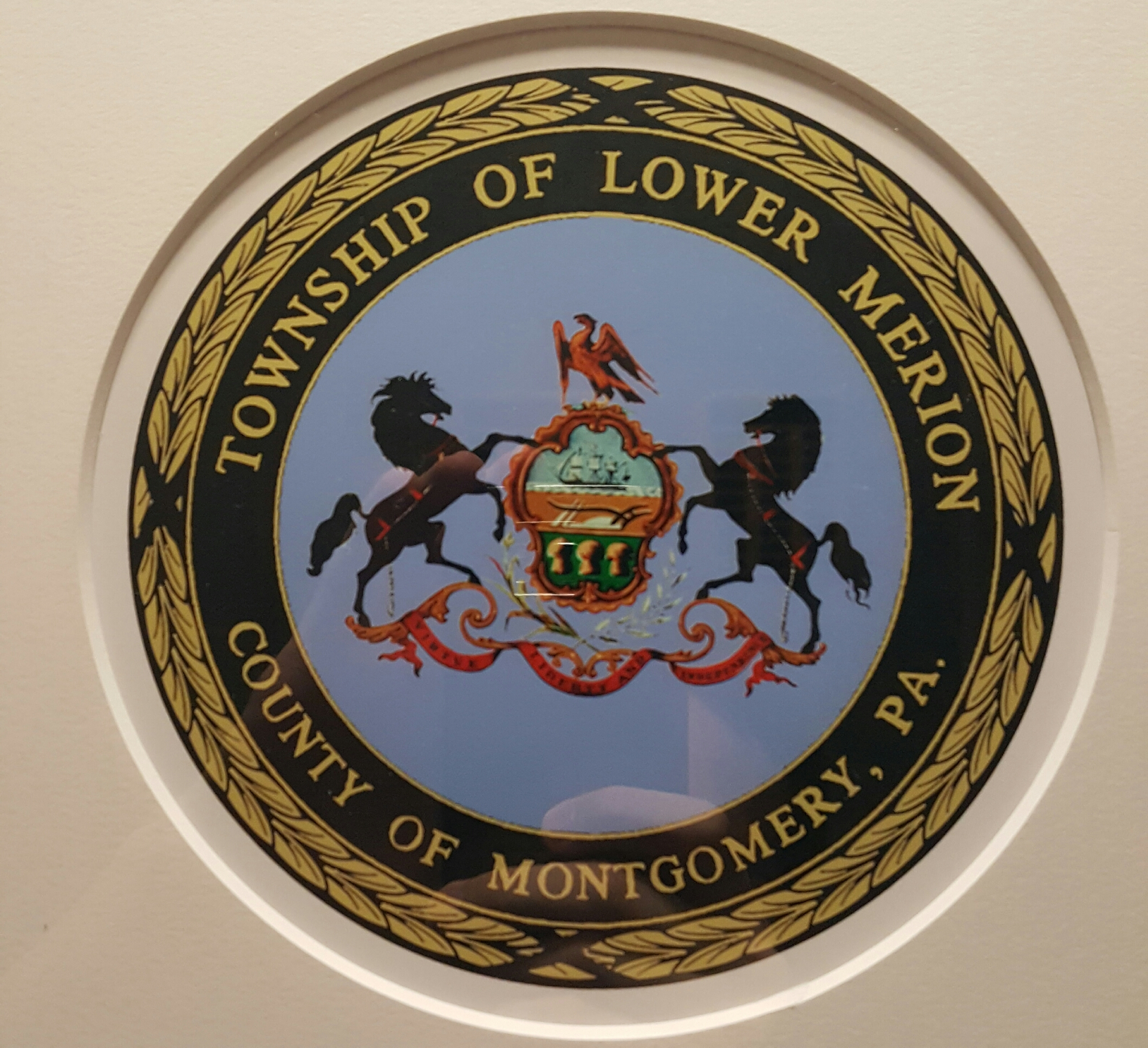
- Flag Seal
- Motto: "A First-Class Township"
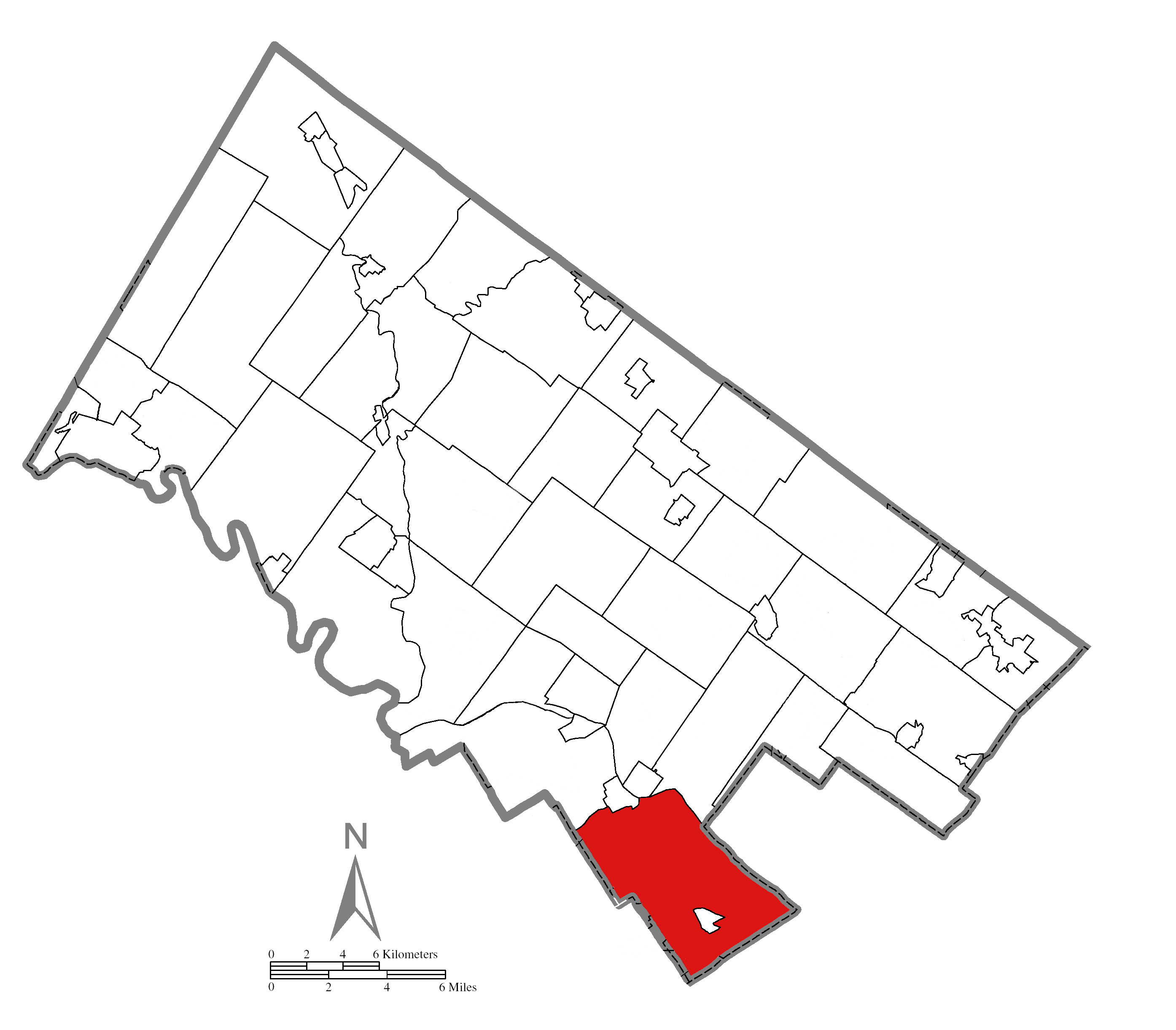
- Location of Lower Merion Township in Montgomery County, Pennsylvania

- Location of Lower Merion Township in Pennsylvania
- Coordinates: 39°59′00″N 75°15′59″W
- Country: United States
- State: Pennsylvania
- County: Montgomery
- Settled: 1682
- Incorporated: 1713

Government
  - Township Manager: Ernie McNeely
  - Board President: Todd Sinai (D)

Area
  - Total: 23.83 sq mi (61.73 km^{2})
  - Land: 23.61 sq mi (61.16 km^{2})
  - Water: 0.22 sq mi (0.57 km^{2})
- Elevation: 200 ft (61 m)

Population (2020)
  - Total: 63,633
  - Estimate (2021): 64,148
  - Density: 2,700/sq mi (1,040/km^{2})
- Time zone: UTC-5 (EST)
  - Summer (DST): UTC-4 (EDT)
- Area code: 610 and 484
- FIPS code: 42-091-44976
- Website: www.lowermerion.org

Lower Merion Township is a township in Montgomery County, Pennsylvania, United States. It is part of the Philadelphia Main Line. The township's name originates with the county of Merioneth in north Wales. Merioneth is an English-language transcription of the Welsh Meirionnydd.

A number of Main Line suburbs are located in Lower Merion, west of Philadelphia, the sixth largest city in the United States as of 2020. With a population of 63,633, Lower Merion Township is the ninth-most populous municipality in Pennsylvania as of the 2020 U.S. census.

The center of Lower Merion Township is located 11.9 miles (19.2 km) northwest of central Philadelphia, Pennsylvania's largest city-county, and parts of Lower Merion border this section of the city.

== History ==
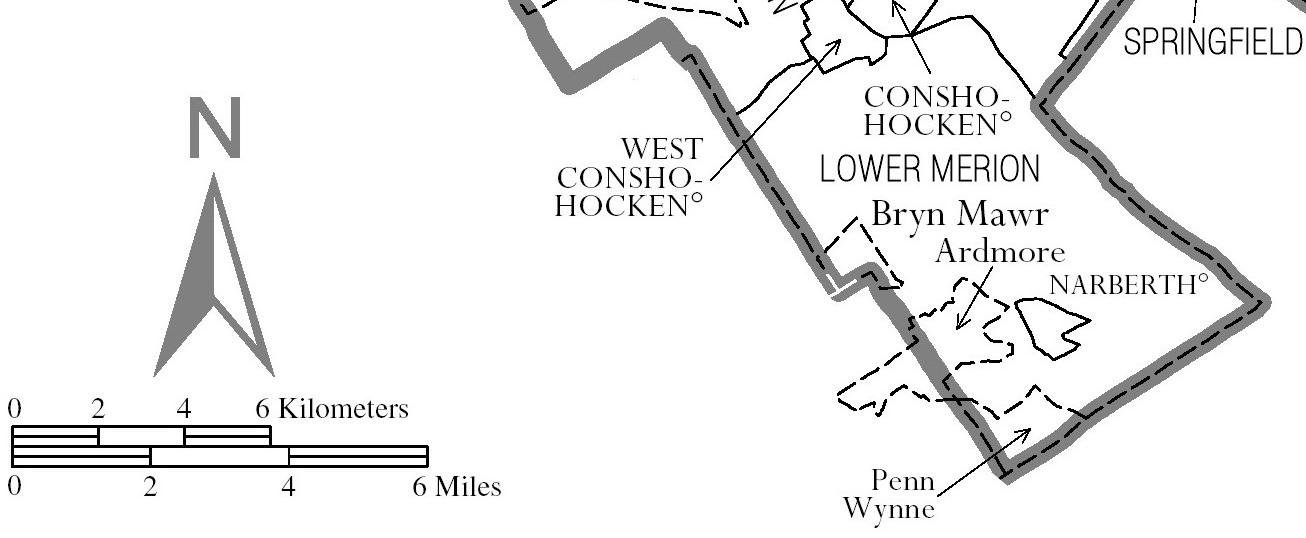
Map of Lower Merion Township

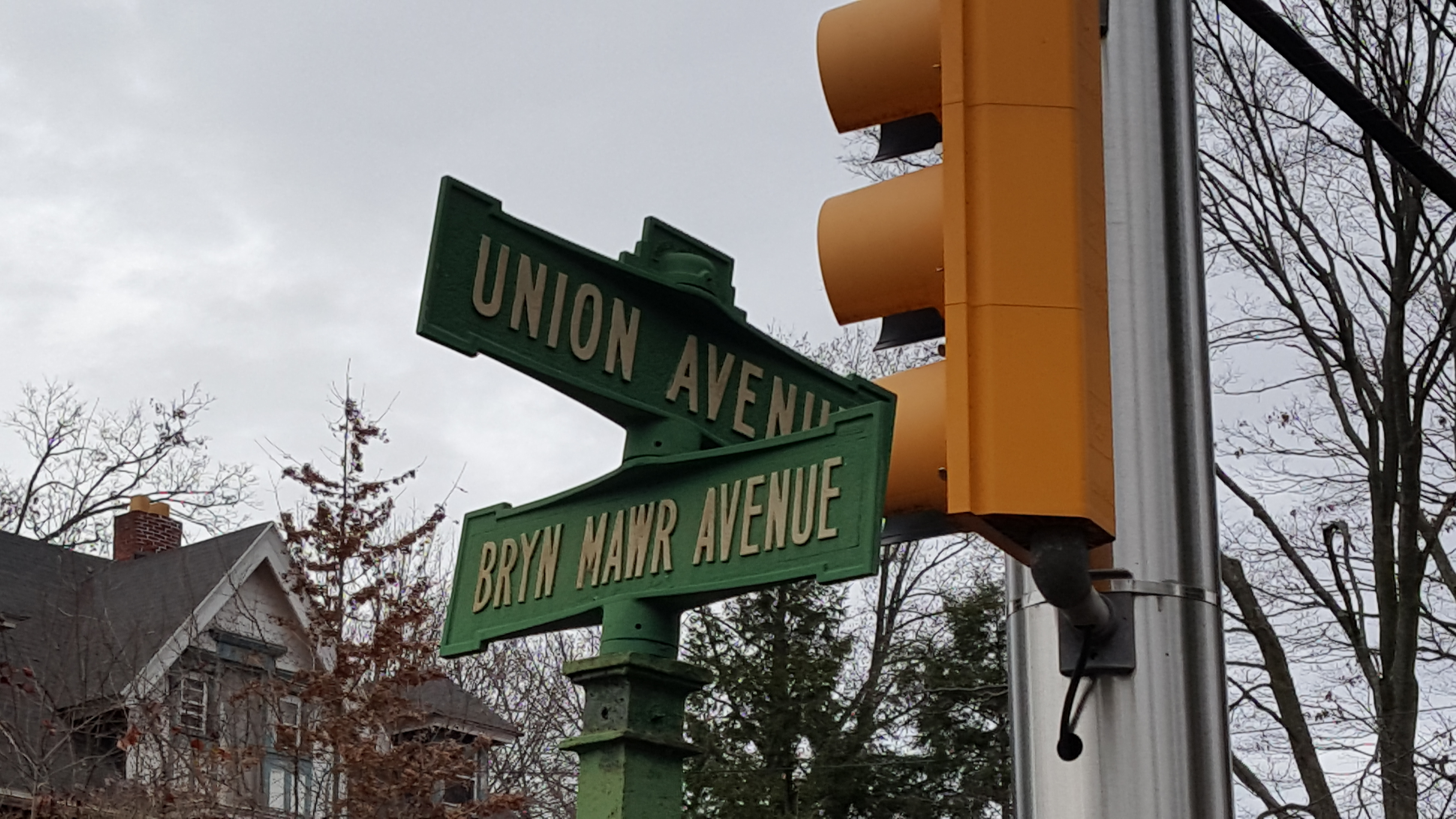
Lower Merion street signs

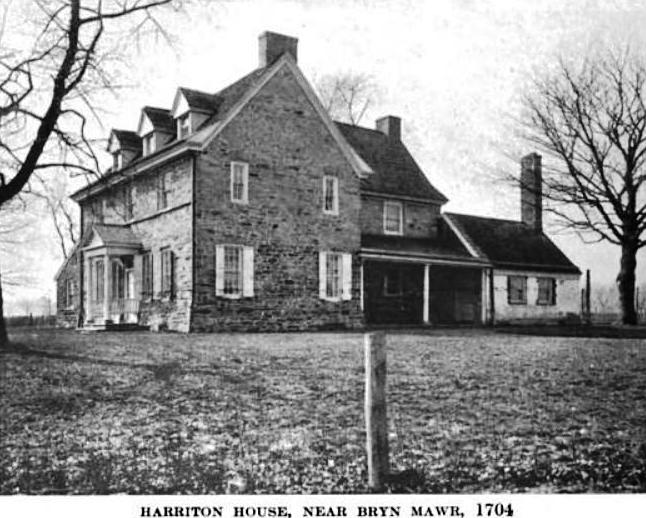
Harriton House as it appeared c. 1919

Lower Merion Township was first settled in 1682 by Welsh Quakers, who were granted a tract of land, the Welsh Tract, by William Penn. In 1713, Lower Merion was established as an independent Township with about 52 landholders and tenants. In 1900, the Township was incorporated as a Township of the First Class. Lower Merion is home to the oldest continuously used place of worship in the United States, the Merion Friends Meeting House, used continuously since 1695.

On April 4, 1991, U.S. Senator John Heinz died while as a passenger in a Piper Aerostar propeller aircraft when it collided with a Bell 412 helicopter over the Merion Elementary School in the Merion air disaster. The other four people in both aircraft also died, and the falling debris from the aircraft also caused the death of two elementary students and injured five others.

The Mill Creek Historic District, and Seville Theatre are listed on the National Register of Historic Places. Green Hill Farms was added in 2011.

In 2010, the township received national media attention when a student filed a lawsuit, Robbins v. Lower Merion School District, after a school administrator used the webcam of a school-issued laptop to spy on the student while the student was in his home. The Electronic Frontier Foundation (EFF) and the American Civil Liberties Union (ACLU) filed an amicus brief in support of the student.

In 2012, the Federal Highway Administration modified the Manual on Uniform Traffic Control Devices in a way that would have required the replacement of Lower Merion Township's historic street signs, some of which date back to the early 1910s. After some campaigning by local residents and by Senator Pat Toomey, the Lower Merion Board of Commissioners declared, via an ordinance, the entire Lower Merion as a historic district and received a waiver from Secretary of Transportation Ray LaHood.

== Geography ==
According to the U.S. Census Bureau, the township has a total area of 23.9 square miles (61.8 km^{2}), of which 23.7 square miles (61.4 km^{2}) is land and 0.2 square mile (0.4 km^{2}) (0.67%) is water.

The township is bounded by Wynnefield Heights, Belmont Village, Wynnefield, and Overbrook in the city/county of Philadelphia; the boroughs of Conshohocken and West Conshohocken; the townships of Upper Merion; Whitemarsh; Haverford; and Radnor. The borough of Narberth, a separate political entity of one-half square mile, is completely surrounded by the township.

Forming the township's southern border is City Avenue, known to many locals as "City Line", a very busy major artery in this part of the metro area that also separates Montgomery and Philadelphia counties. City Avenue begins at the Schuylkill Expressway (I-76), where it also becomes U.S. Route 1, and between this area south to Bala Cynwyd is sometimes referred to as the Golden Mile. Many buildings, including the radio and television studios of Philadelphia's NBC and ABC affiliates, PCOM, and the Fox and Germantown Savings Bank towers, line the avenue beside newer office complexes, shopping centers, and restaurants. Situated behind a lot of these spaces are condos and townhomes; several well-known residences are 191 Presidential, Corinthian Condominium and Sutton Terrace. The township's eastern border is along the Schuylkill River.

Before European settlement, Lower Merion's dense forest was home to bears, cougars, wolves, rattlesnakes, otters, beavers, weasels, turkeys, grouse, woodland bison, trout, and bald eagles. When Europeans arrived, they began cutting down the forests, chasing away much of the wildlife. After World War II, Lower Merion transformed from a farming township to a suburban area, and wildlife changed accordingly. Today, red foxes, white-footed mice, horned owls, skunks, raccoons, crayfish, songbirds, butterflies, and white-tailed deer populate the township.

=== Unincorporated communities ===
- Ardmore (also in Delaware County)
- Bala Cynwyd
- Belmont Hills
- Bryn Mawr (also in Delaware County)
- Gladwyne
- Haverford (also in Delaware County)
- Haverford College (also in Delaware County)
- Merion Station
- Overbrook Hills
- Pencoyd
- Penn Valley
- Penn Wynne
- Roseglen
- Rosemont (also in Delaware County)
- Villanova (also in Delaware County)
- Wynnewood

=== Climate ===
Lower Merion straddles the boundary between a hot-summer humid continental climate (Dfa) and a humid subtropical climate (Cfa). The hardiness zone is 7b. Average monthly temperatures in Gladwyne range from 31.7 °F in January to 76.5 °F in July, in Bryn Mawr they range from 31.4 °F in January to 76.4 °F in July, and at the former location of NBC 10 studios in Bala Cynwyd they range from 32.6 °F in January to 77.4 °F in July.

== Demographics ==
Historical population
Census	Pop.	Note	%±
1900	13,271		—
1910	17,671		33.2%
1920	23,866		35.1%
1930	35,166		47.3%
1940	39,566		12.5%
1950	48,745		23.2%
1960	59,420		21.9%
1970	63,594		7.0%
1980	59,635		−6.2%
1990	58,003		−2.7%
2000	59,850		3.2%
2010	57,825		−3.4%
2020	63,633		10.0%

As of the 2010 census, the township was 85.7% White, 5.6% Black or African American, 0.1% Native American, 6.0% Asian, and 1.9% were two or more races. 3.0% of the population were of Hispanic or Latino ancestry.

As of the 2020 census, there were 63,633 people, 22,868 households, and 15,024 families residing in the township. The population density was 2,670.29 inhabitants per square mile (1,031.00/km^{2}). The racial makeup of the township was 76.11% White, 9.03% Asian, 6.54% African American, 0.14% Native American, 0.02% Pacific Islander, 1.61% from other races and 6.55% from two or more races. Hispanic or Latino of any race were 3.70% of the population.

According to the 2000 census, there were 22,868 households, 29.4% of which had children under the age of 18 living with them, 56.7% were married couples living together, 7.0% had a female householder with no husband present, and 34.3% were non-families. 28.3% of all households were made up of individuals, and 12.4% had someone living alone who was 65 years of age or older. The average household size was 2.42 and the average family size was 2.99.

In the township, the population was spread out, with 21.7% under the age of 18, 10.7% from 18 to 24, 23.0% from 25 to 44, 26.2% from 45 to 64 and 18.5% who were 65 years of age or older. The median age was 41 years. For every 100 females, there were 83.5 males. For every 100 women aged 18 and over, there were 78.7 males.

The median income for a household in the township was $86,373, and the median income for a family was $115,694 (these figures had risen to $114,608 and $148,123 respectively as of a 2007 estimate). Men had a median income of $77,692 versus $43,793 for women. The per capita income for the township was $55,526. About 1.9% of families and 4.5% of the population were below the poverty line, including 2.8% of those under age 18 and 5.6% of those age 65 or over.

== Government and politics ==
Presidential elections results
Year	Republican	Democratic
2024	22.9% 9,761	76.2% 32,462
2020	20.7% 8,662	78.6% 32,838
2016	21.2% 7,841	75.5% 27,906
2012	33.4% 11,945	65.7% 23,516
2008	29.1% 10,747	70.4% 26,006
2004	33.0% 11,990	66.7% 24,262
2000	32.0% 10,657	65.9% 21,946
1996	35.1% 10,774	59.1% 18,178
1992	35.6% 12,249	54.7% 18,814

Lower Merion is a first-class township with 14 commissioners elected by ward.

- Daniel Bernheim (D), Ward 1
- Joshua Grimes (D), Ward 2
- Jeremiah Woodring (D), Ward 3
- Anthony C. Stevenson (D), Ward 4
- Ray A. Courtney (D), Ward 5
- Andrew S. Gavrin (D), Ward 6
- Sean P. Whalen (D), Ward 7
- Craig Timberlake (D), Ward 8
- Louis E. Rossman (D), Ward 9
- V. Scott Zelov (R), Ward 10
- Maggie Harper Epstein (D), Ward 11
- Todd M. Sinai (D), Ward 12, President
- Gilda L. Kramer (D), Ward 13
- Shelby Sparrow (D), Ward 14

The township is part of the Fourth Congressional District (represented by Rep. Madeleine Dean), the Fifth Congressional District (represented by Rep. Mary Gay Scanlon), the 149th State House District (represented by Rep. Tim Briggs), the 148th State House District (represented by Rep. Mary Jo Daley), and the 17th State Senate District (represented by Sen. Amanda Cappelletti).

== Transportation ==
=== Roads and highways ===
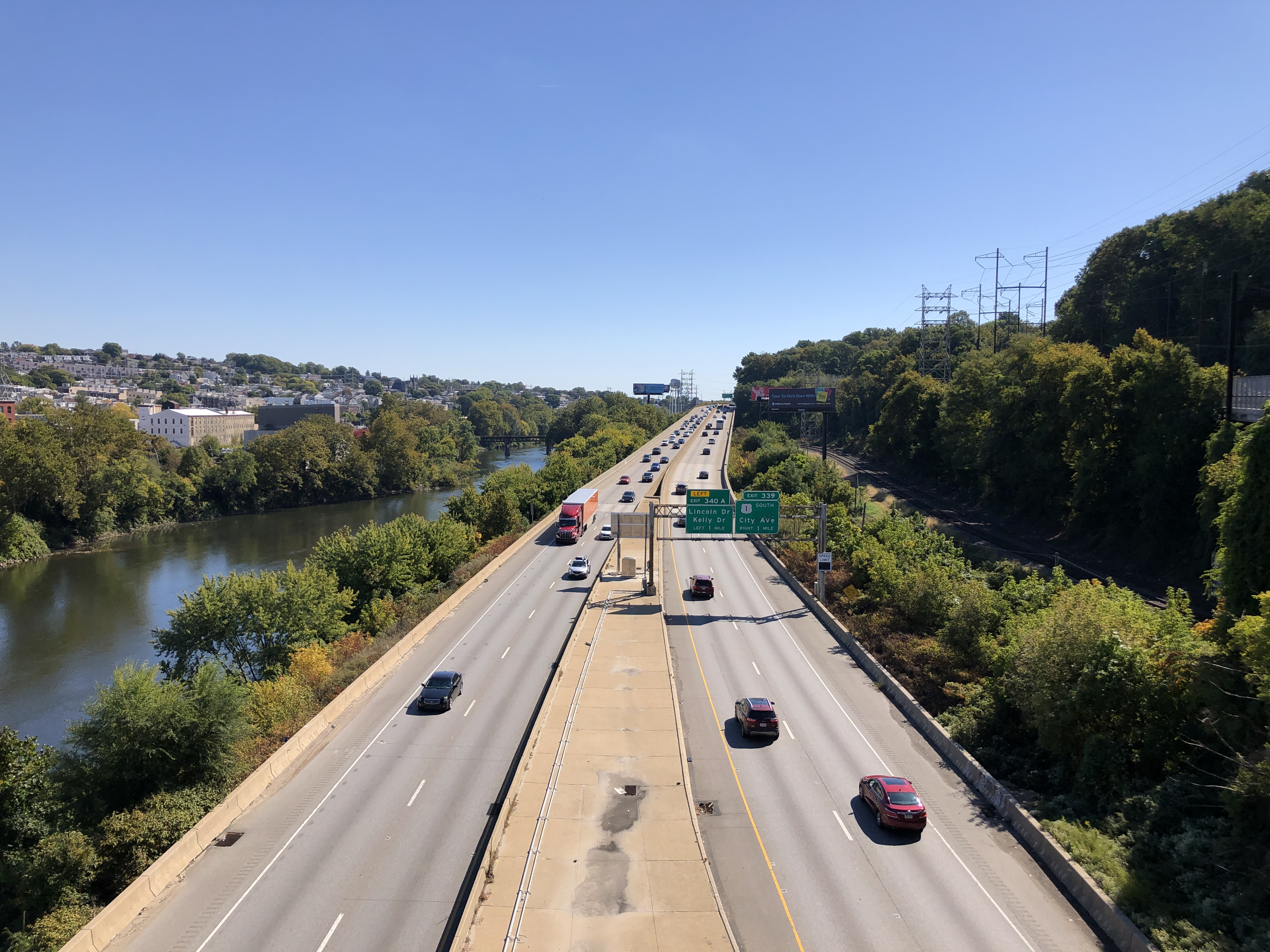
The Schuylkill Expressway (I-76) eastbound in Lower Merion Township

As of 2018, there were 240.08 miles (386.37 km) of public roads in Lower Merion Township, of which 35.14 miles (56.55 km) were maintained by the Pennsylvania Department of Transportation (PennDOT) and 204.94 miles (329.82 km) were maintained by the township.

Several major highways traverse Lower Merion Township, including the Schuylkill Expressway (Interstate 76), the "Blue Route" (Interstate 476), U.S. Route 1, U.S. Route 30, Pennsylvania Route 320, and Pennsylvania Route 23. I-76 follows a northwest-southeast route along the northeastern border of the township, adjacent to its namesake river, while I-476 and PA 320 both clip the far northwest corner of the township. US 1 follows City Avenue along the southeastern border of the township, while US 30 follows Lancaster Avenue across southern portions of the township. Finally, PA 23 follows Conshohocken State Road through the heart of Lower Merion Township.

=== Public transportation ===
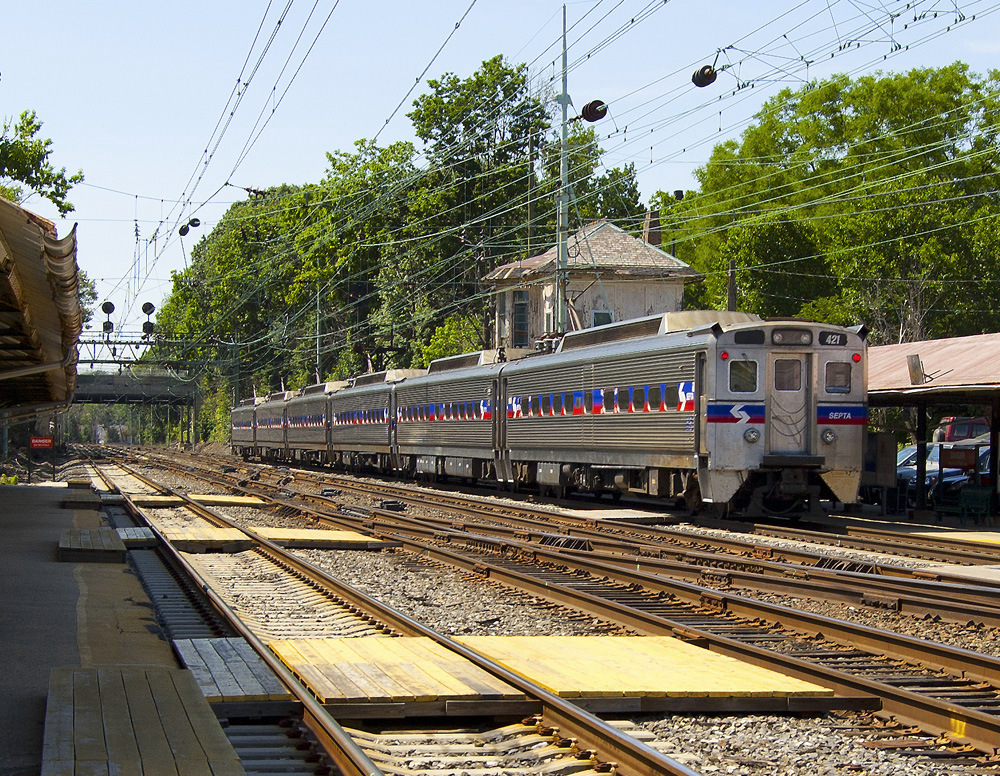
A westbound Paoli/Thorndale Line train departing Bryn Mawr Station

Lower Merion Township is the heart of the affluent Philadelphia Main Line series of suburban communities, named after the "Main Line" of the former Pennsylvania Railroad that runs through the township. Now known as SEPTA Regional Rail's Paoli/Thorndale Line, the rail line has station stops in Lower Merion in the following communities within the township:

- Merion Station in Merion
- Wynnewood Station in Wynnewood
- Ardmore Station in Ardmore (also served by Amtrak's Keystone Service)
- Haverford Station in Haverford
- Bryn Mawr Station in Bryn Mawr
- Rosemont Station in Rosemont

SEPTA Regional Rail's Cynwyd Line, with weekday service, has stops at:

- Bala Station
- Cynwyd Station (both in Bala Cynwyd)

SEPTA operates the Norristown High Speed Line between Norristown Transportation Center and 69th Street Transportation Center through the western part of Lower Merion Township with stops located at Matsonford and County Line, with additional stops located just outside the township in Delaware County. SEPTA provides bus service to Lower Merion Township along City Bus routes 1, 44, 52, 63, and 65 and Suburban Bus routes 103 and 105, serving points of interest in the township and offering connections to Philadelphia and other suburbs.

== Economy ==
=== Top employers ===
According to a Lower Merion Township bond document, the top employers in 2018 were:

#	Employer	# of Employees	Community
1	Main Line Health (Lankenau Medical Center and Bryn Mawr Hospital)	4,168	Wynnewood and Bryn Mawr
2	Lower Merion School District	1,779	Ardmore
3	Susquehanna International Group	1,270	Bala Cynwyd
4	Bryn Mawr College	1,112	Bryn Mawr
5	Maxim Healthcare Services	723	Bala Cynwyd
6	Saint Joseph's University	603	Merion
7	Great Valley Health	584	Bryn Mawr
8	Maguire Insurance Agency	482	Bala Cynwyd
9	Township of Lower Merion	474	Ardmore
10	365 Health Services, LLC	435	Bala Cynwyd

== Education ==
=== Primary and secondary schools ===
==== Public schools ====
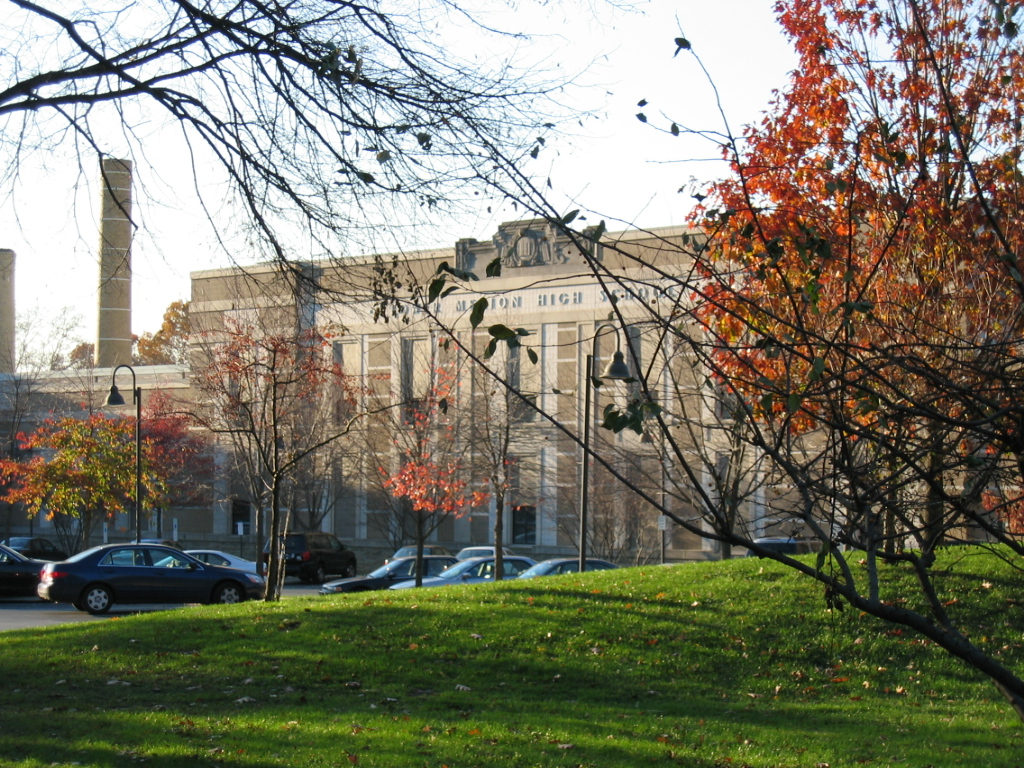
Lower Merion High School's prerenovation building

Pupils living in the Lower Merion Township attend schools in the Lower Merion School District unless they go to a private school. The educational roots of the township stretch back to the Lower Merion Academy, one of the first public schools in the country.

There are six elementary schools, three middle schools, and two high schools, Lower Merion and Harriton High School. Students are split between schools depending on location of residence.

==== Private schools ====
Rosemont School of the Holy Child, located in Rosemont and in Lower Merion Township, is affiliated with but not governed by the Roman Catholic Archdiocese of Philadelphia. The school is adjacent to Rosemont College.

Other private schools in the township include The Shipley School, The Baldwin School, Waldron Mercy Academy, The Haverford School, Friends Central School, French International School of Philadelphia, Kohelet Yeshiva High School, The Mesivta High School, and Caskey Torah Academy.

=== Colleges and universities ===
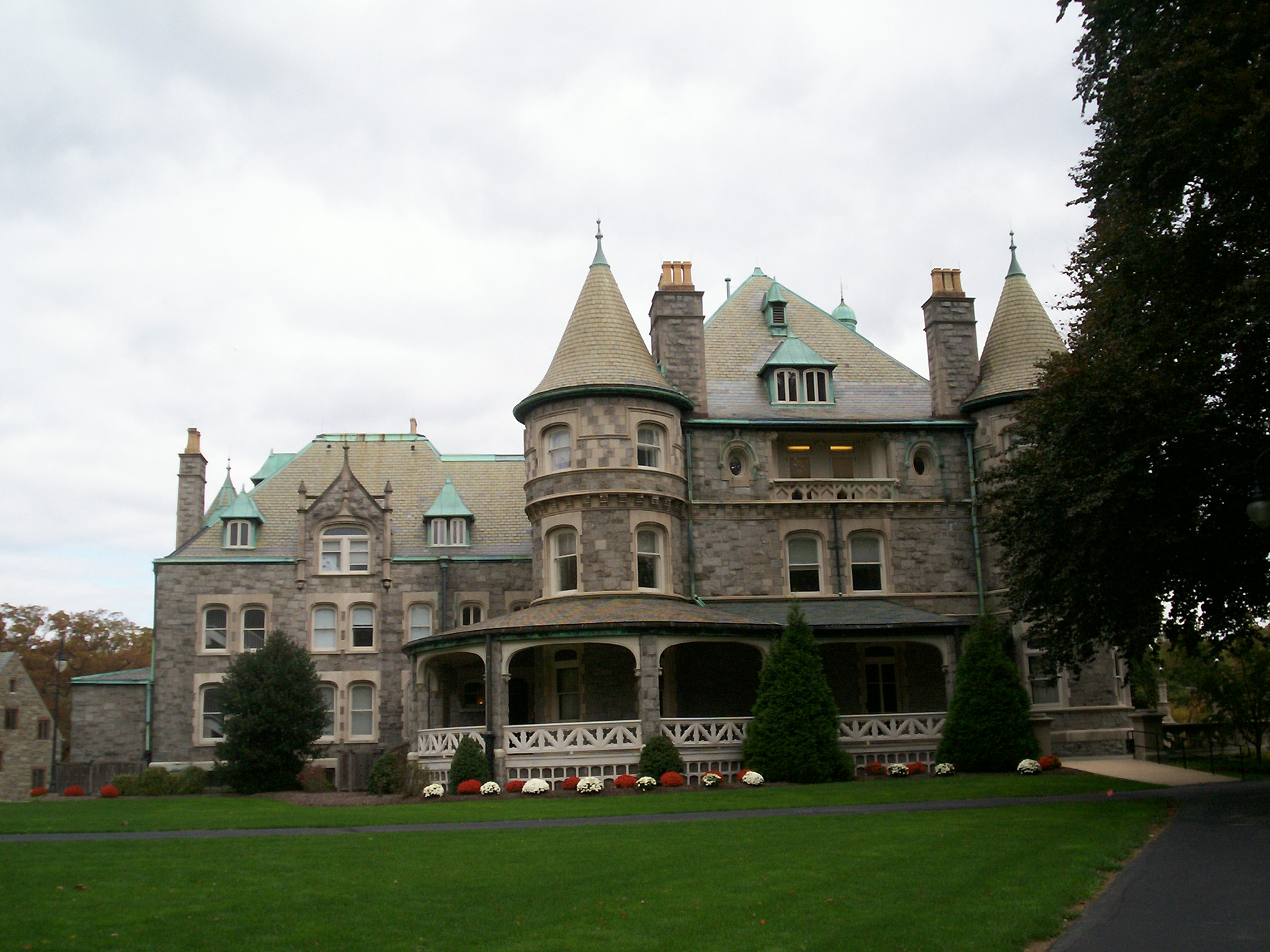
Rosemont College's Main Building

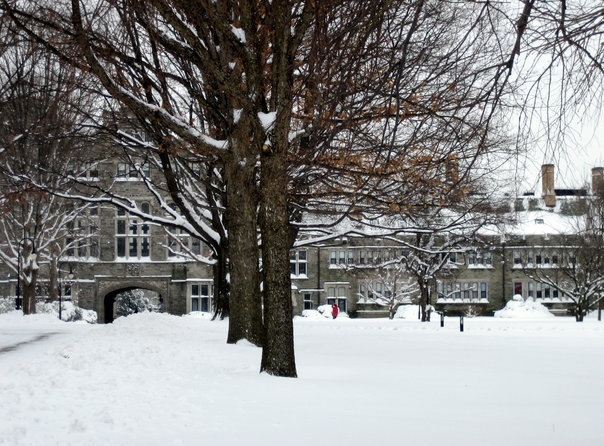
Bryn Mawr College's Pembroke Hall

Bryn Mawr College, Harcum College, and Rosemont College are located in Lower Merion Township. The campus of Saint Joseph's University straddles the city line between Lower Merion and Philadelphia, while Haverford College straddles the lines between Lower Merion and Haverford Townships.

=== Other education ===
The Japanese Language School of Philadelphia, a supplementary Japanese school, holds its classes at the Friends Central School (FCS) in Wynnewood and in Lower Merion Township. It was established in 1972.

Residents are also serviced by the Lower Merion Library System.

== Historic features ==
=== NRHP Historic Districts ===
- Bryn Mawr College Historic District
- Gladwyne Historic District
- Mill Creek Historic District

=== Notable buildings and structures ===
- 1690 House (1690), part of Mill Creek Historic District
- Arboretum of the Barnes Foundation (1922)
- The Baldwin School (1890–91), NRHP listed
- Black Rock Dam (1825)
- Bryn Mawr Hospital (1893)
- Bryn Mawr Theater (1926), NRHP listed
- Dolobran (1881)
- Flat Rock Tunnel (1838–40)
- Green Hill Farms (1695), NRHP listed
- Harriton House (1704), NRHP listed
- Idlewild Farm Complex (1740), NRHP listed
- Lankenau Medical Center (1953)
- Lower Merion Academy (1812), NRHP listed
- Manayunk Bridge (1918)
- Merion Cricket Club (1897), NRHP listed
- Merion Friends Meeting House (1714), NRHP listed
- Merion Tribute House (1924)
- Pencoyd (c.1690, demolished 1964)
- Philadelphia Country Club (1890)
- Rathalla, Rosemont College (1889–91), NRHP listed
- St. Charles Borromeo Seminary (1871)
- Suburban Square (1928)
- Old Library (1901–07), NRHP listed
- General Wayne Inn (1704), NRHP listed
- West Laurel Hill Cemetery (1869), NRHP listed
- Whitehall Apartments (1925–26), NRHP listed
- Woodmont (1891–94), NRHP listed
- Yorklynne (1899–1902, demolished 1974), former campus of Episcopal Academy, removed from NRHP 1974

== Notable people ==
- Hap Arnold, former World War II Air Force general
- Albert C. Barnes, founder, Barnes Foundation
- James H. Billington, former Librarian of Congress
- Kobe Bryant, former professional basketball player, Los Angeles Lakers
- Taylor Buchholz, former professional baseball player, Colorado Rockies, Houston Astros, New York Mets, and Toronto Blue Jays
- John Debella, former DJ, WMMR and WMGK
- Shelly Gross, film producer
- Alexander Haig, former U.S. Secretary of State
- Patti LaBelle, Grammy award-winning rhythm and blues singer
- Howard Lassoff, former professional basketball player, Israeli Premier League
- Jeffrey Lurie, owner, Philadelphia Eagles
- Garry Maddox, former professional player baseball player, Philadelphia Phillies and San Francisco Giants
- Brooke McCarter, actor, singer, director, producer star of the film The Lost Boys
- Tim McCarver, former professional baseball player and broadcaster
- David Magerman, philanthropist
- Teddy Pendergrass, Grammy winning singer
- M. Night Shyamalan, filmmaker
- Martin J. Silverstein, attorney and former U.S. ambassador to Uruguay
- Lawrence Summers, former Harvard University president and current OpenAI trustee
- David Corenswet, actor

== See also ==
- Radnor Township
- Tredyffrin Township
- Easttown Township
- Haverford Township
- Whitemarsh Township
- Borough of Conshohocken
- Upper Merion Township
- Philadelphia
- Montgomery County, Pennsylvania

Preceded by Haverford Township; Delaware County	Bordering communities of Philadelphia	Succeeded by Whitemarsh Township
