= Belmont Hills, Pennsylvania =

Unincorporated community in Pennsylvania, US

Belmont Hills
- Neighborhood of Bala Cynwyd
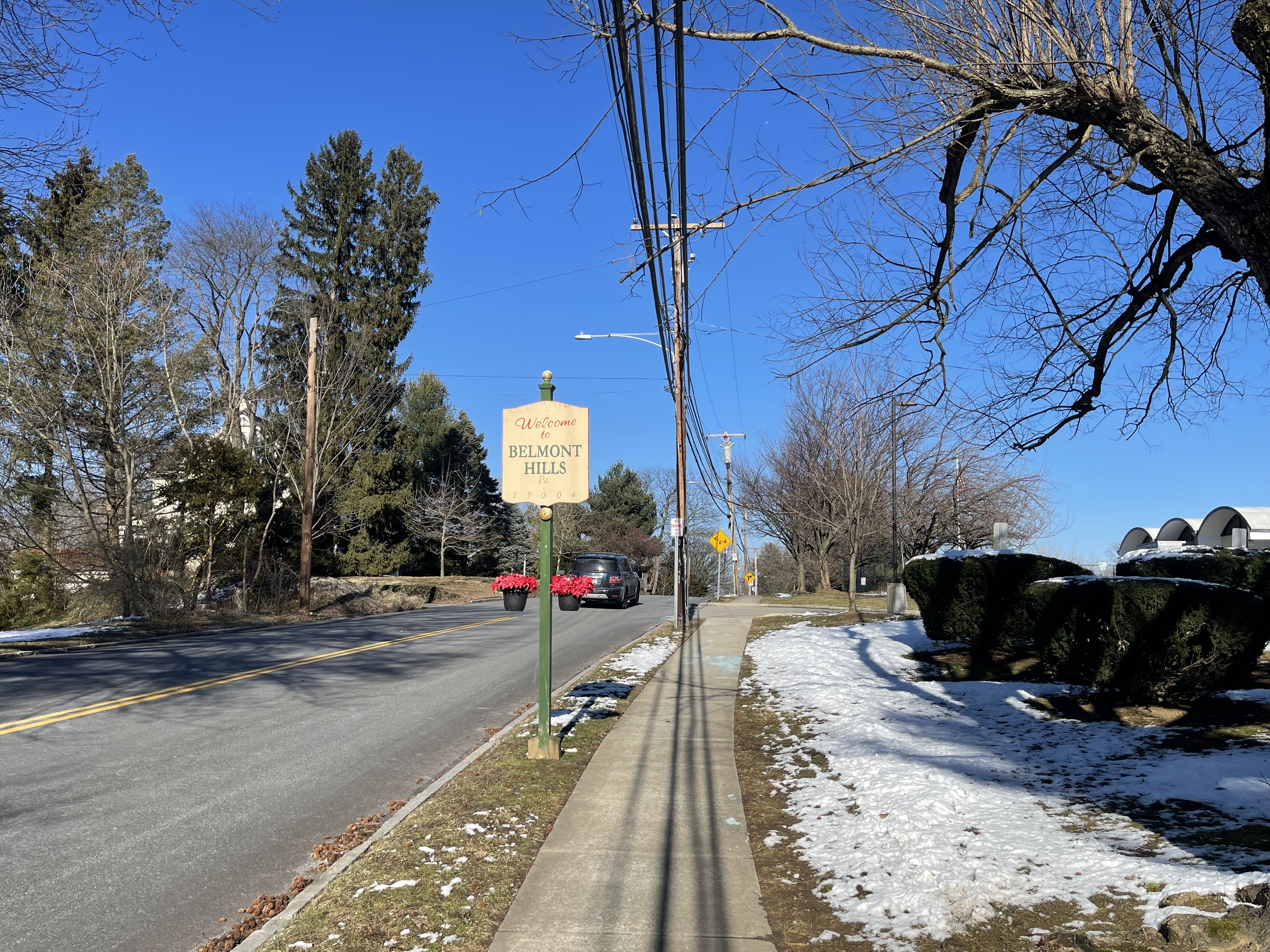
- Belmont Hills welcome sign

- Location of Belmont Hills Belmont Hills (the United States)
- Coordinates: 40°02′03″N 75°15′28″W
- Country: United States
- State: Pennsylvania
- County: Montgomery
- Township: Lower Merion
- Elevation: 302 ft (92 m)
- Time zone: UTC-5 (EST)
  - Summer (DST): UTC-4 (EDT)
- Zip Code: 19004
- Area codes: 484 and 610

Located in Lower Merion Township, Montgomery County, Pennsylvania, United States, Belmont Hills is a suburb of Philadelphia. Belmont Hills is a neighborhood within the village of Bala Cynwyd. It is a distinct community with its own public elementary school, public pool, fire department and public library. Belmont Hills is known for its hilly terrain. Belmont means "Beautiful Mountain" so its literal name is "Beautiful Mountain Hills".

== Name changes ==
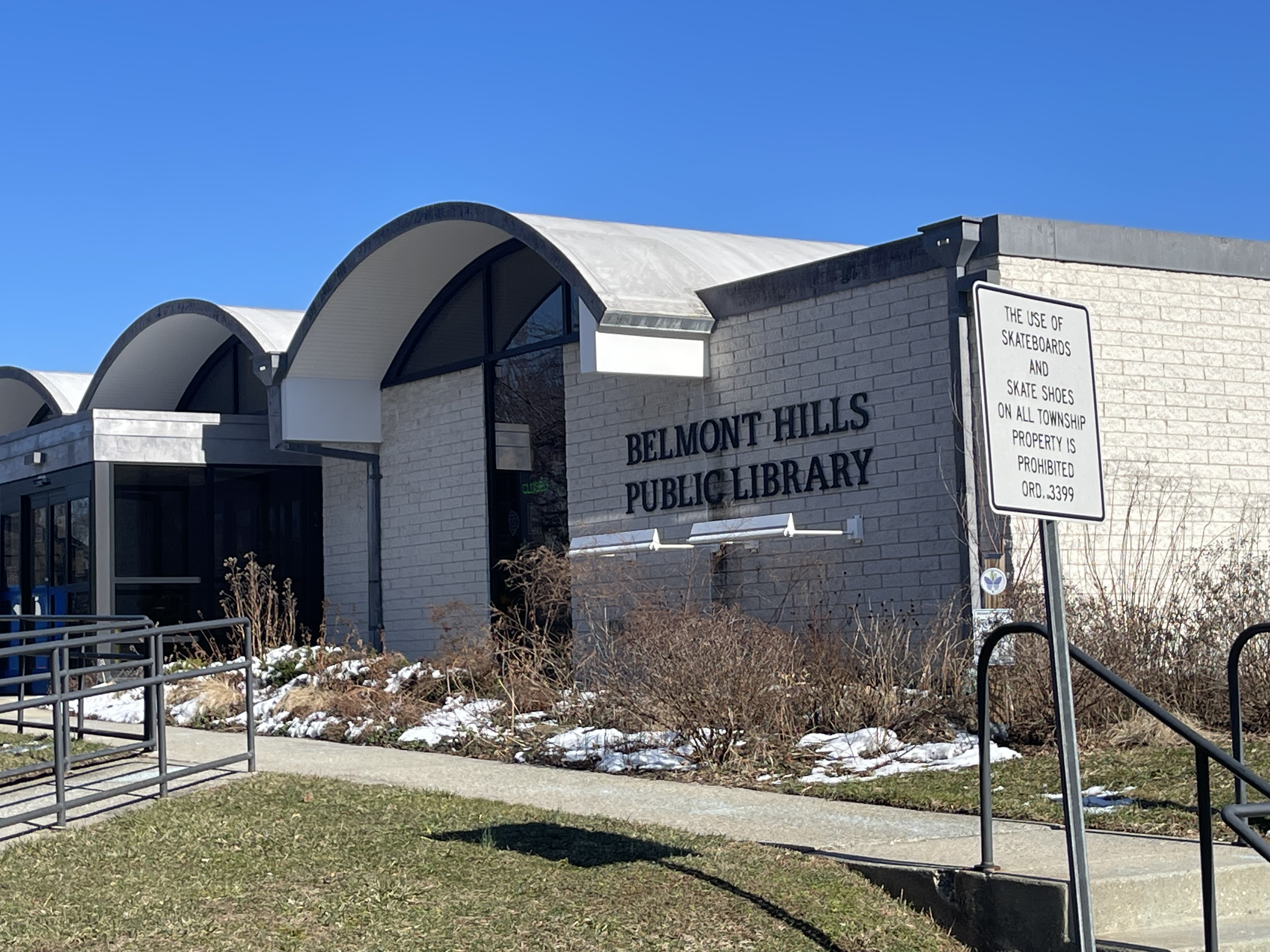
Belmont Hills library, part of the Lower Merion Library System.

Until the Reading Railroad was built, Belmont Hills was known as Rocky Hill. It was then called West Manayunk. In the 1950s the name was changed to the current name.

== History ==
The Ashland Avenue School was built in 1919, starting with grades K-8; twenty years later, it became K-6. In 1952, the school was renamed Belmont Hills School. In 1978, the grades changed to K-5. The school was closed in June 1982 because there were too many elementary schools and not enough children in the area. In 1999, Belmont Hills was reopened as Belmont Hills Elementary School.

In 1917, a civic group began a community fire fighting service in West Manayunk. Initially, fires were fought with the assistance of a hand-drawn chemical wagon. A year later, a horse-drawn wagon was purchased, this allowed the brigade members a little more energy for actually fighting the fires. By 1919, the West Manayunk Fire Company had officially been recognized as a township fire company in Lower Merion, and had appointed its first chief, Joseph Reilly. In 1920, the parcel of land on South Washington Avenue – the current site of the Belmont Hills Fire Company – was purchased. In order to conduct fire company meetings, space was rented at the nearby Ashland School. Architectural plans for the newly chartered fire company were made, the Women's Auxiliary was formed, and the first motorized piece of fire fighting apparatus was secured.

In 1926, West Manayunk Fire Station become a physical reality and, that same year, two modernized La France fire trucks were housed. A decade later, growing out of its original space, the fire station was enlarged to its present status. The name change to the Belmont Hills Fire Company was officially adopted in the late 1950s. In the late sixties, due in part to the proximity of the newly constructed Schuylkill Expressway, in addition to the need for a township rescue unit, the Belmont Hills Fire Company was designated as a heavy rescue squad.

In 1948, an explosion in the quarry off of Rock Hill Road caused an explosion so intense that a 30 pound stone was launched onto the lawn of a home on Maple Avenue near the quarry. While no one was hurt in the event several residents reported broken windows and cracked ceilings within their homes.

In 1975, Belmont Hills changed its zip code from the Manayunk 19127 zip code to the Bala Cynwyd 19004 zip code; to accurately reflect the town’s location within Montgomery County.

== Commercial district ==
Belmont Hills has no commercial district. The closest thing to a main street is Marywaters Ford Rd./Ashland Ave., entering the town limits from the west, running by the pool, library, and McMorran Park and ending as the road merges into Jefferson Street just 0.6 miles from end to end.
