= Gladwyne Historic District =

Historic district in Pennsylvania, United States

- U.S. National Register of Historic Places
- U.S. Historic district
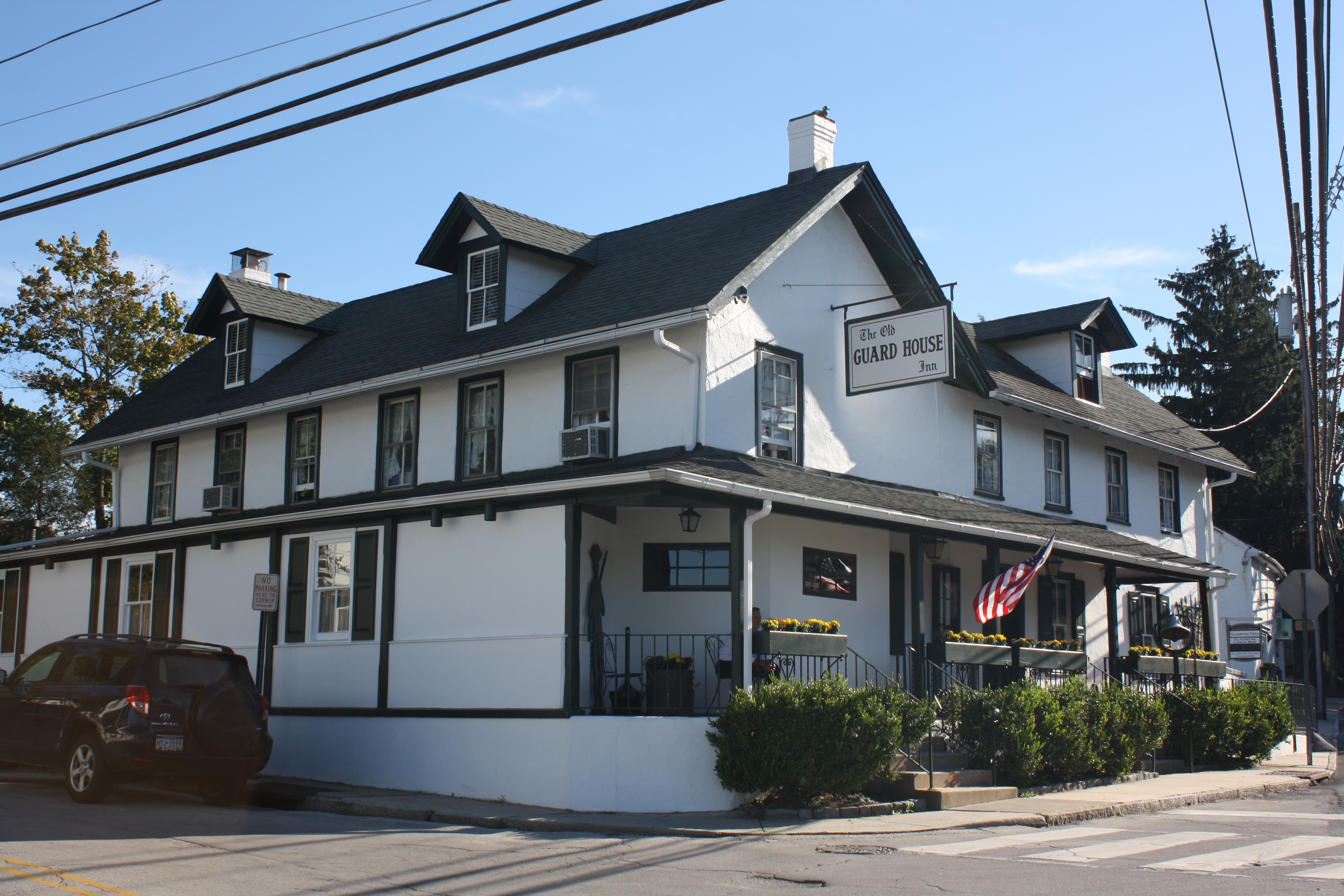
- The Old Guard House Inn in Gladwyne Historic District. September 2012.

- Location within Pennsylvania Location within the United States
- Location: PA 23, Gladwyne, Lower Merion Township, Pennsylvania
- Coordinates: 40°02′12″N 75°16′52″W
- Area: 63.2 acres (25.6 ha)
- NRHP reference No.: 80003577
- Added to NRHP: December 10, 1980

The Gladwyne Historic District is a national historic district which is located in Gladwyne in Lower Merion Township, Montgomery County, Pennsylvania.

It was added to the National Register of Historic Places in 1980.

== History and architectural features ==
This district encompasses fifty-seven contributing buildings, which were erected in the historic core of Gladwyne, known as "Merion Square." It includes mainly mill or farm worker dwellings that are predominantly two-and-one-half-story, two-bay, stuccoed stone structures, which date to the early- to mid-nineteenth century. Notable buildings include the Guard House Inn, the "War Office," which was built in 1798, and the Gladwyne Library.
