= Whitehall Apartments =

- U.S. National Register of Historic Places
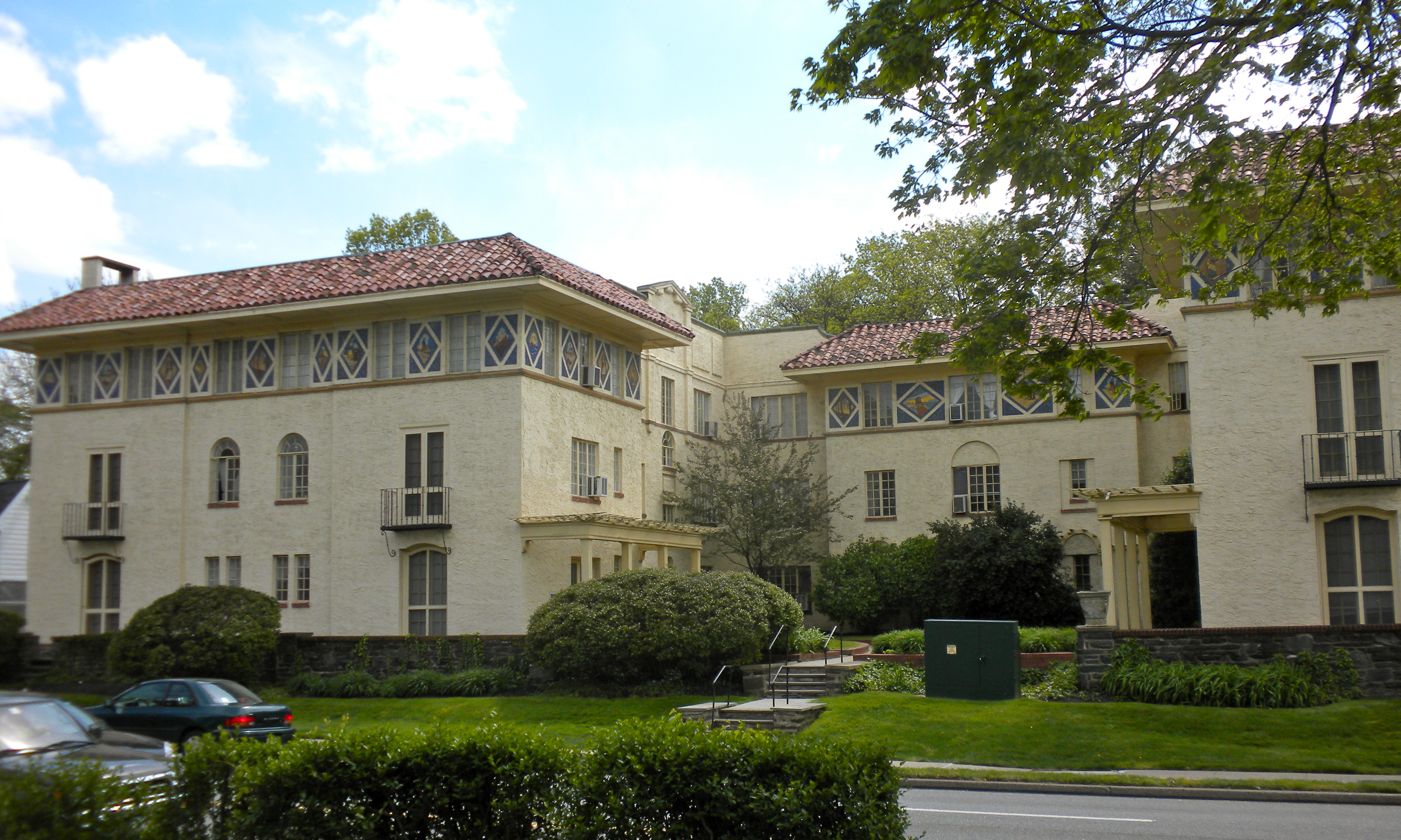
- Whitehall Apartments, April 2010

- Location within Pennsylvania Location within the United States
- Location: 410 W. Lancaster Ave., Haverford, Pennsylvania
- Coordinates: 40°0′48″N 75°18′10″W
- Area: 1 acre (0.40 ha)
- Built: 1925–1926
- Architect: Lippincott & Schaef
- Architectural style: California-Spanish Mission
- NRHP reference No.: 83004238
- Added to NRHP: December 28, 1983

Whitehall Apartments is a historic apartment building located at Haverford in Lower Merion Township, Montgomery County, Pennsylvania. It was built in 1925–1926, and is a large, 3 1/2-story, E-shaped stucco building in the Mission Revival style. It features wrought iron balconies, blue decorative tile featuring scenes of Christopher Columbus, and red tile roof caps.

It was added to the National Register of Historic Places in 1983.
