= Seville Theatre (Lower Merion Township, Pennsylvania) =

- U.S. National Register of Historic Places
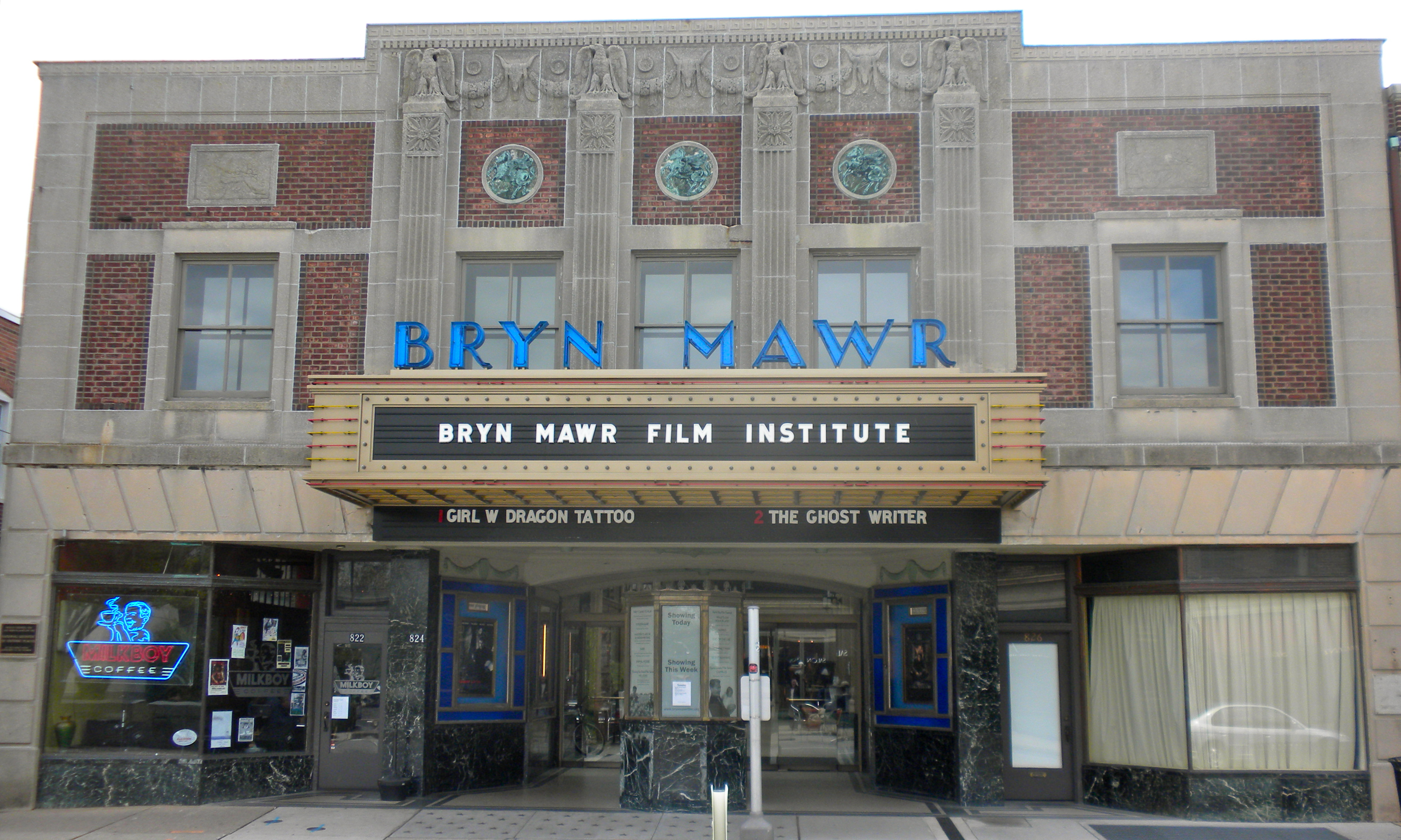
- Bryn Mawr Theatre, April 2010

- Location within Pennsylvania Location within the United States
- Location: 822-826 W. Lancaster Ave., Lower Merion Township, Pennsylvania
- Coordinates: 40°1′24″N 75°19′8″W
- Area: less than one acre
- Built: 1926
- Architect: Lee, William H.
- Architectural style: Beaux Arts
- NRHP reference No.: 05001491
- Added to NRHP: December 28, 2005

The Seville Theatre, also known as the Bryn Mawr Theatre, is an historic theatre building in Lower Merion Township, Montgomery County, Pennsylvania, United States.

It was added to the National Register of Historic Places in 2005.

== History and architectural features ==
Built in 1926, this historic structure is a two-story, three-bay-wide, rectangular, steel-frame building that was designed in the Beaux-Arts style. It measures 56 feet wide and 265 feet deep, and was designed by noted theatre architect William Harold Lee (1884-1971).
