= Idlewild Farm Complex =

Historic house in Pennsylvania, United States

- U.S. National Register of Historic Places
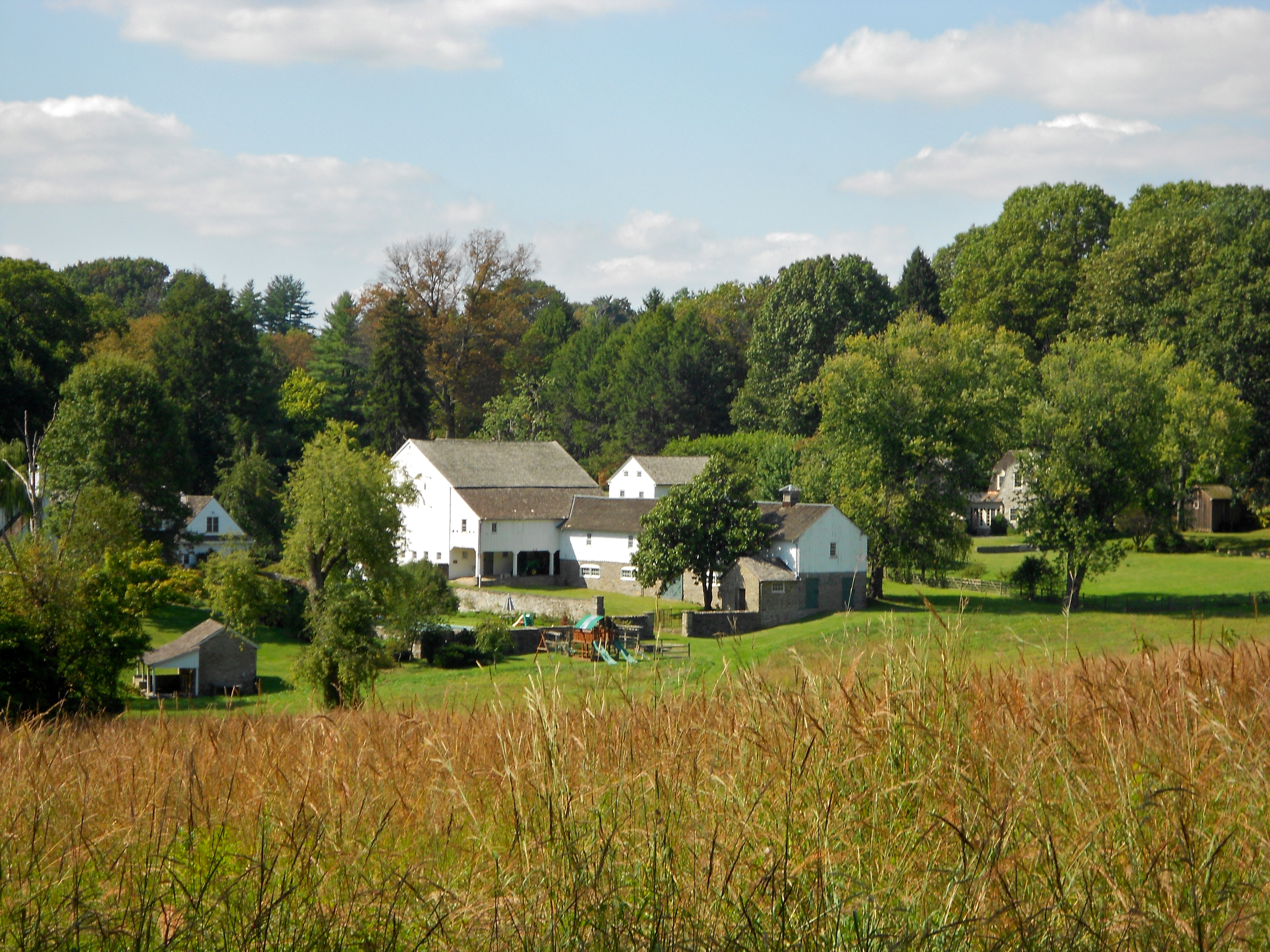

- Location within Pennsylvania Location within the United States
- Location: 617 Williamson Rd., Bryn Mawr, Pennsylvania
- Coordinates: 40°2′9″N 75°17′36″W
- Area: 26 acres (11 ha)
- Built: 1740, although original building was built in 1699.
- Architectural style: Georgian
- NRHP reference No.: 84003505
- Added to NRHP: January 20, 1984

The Idlewild Farm Complex is a 26-acre (11 ha) plot of land in Bryn Mawr, Pennsylvania. It was originally part of the Welsh Tract and is now a portion of the Bridlewild Trails Association.

== Early Times ==
In 1698, Welsh farmer Robert Lloyd was deeded 400 acres (160 ha) of land near "the road leading through the Black Rocks" now known as Black Rock Road. In 1700, Lloyd built a one room with loft house on the property, complete with beehive oven and walk-in fireplace for help with cooking. Over the next 14 years, Lloyd had eight kids and tended to the farm. However, in 1714, Robert Lloyd died.

Lloyd's wife, Lowry Lloyd, soon remarried. Her new husband added a new portion to the house in 1717 and a wooden barn was built.

Along with the change of ownership, the barn was rebuilt to stone in 1825, the two portions of the farmhouse were connected in 1825, and a wagon house was added (1827).

Co‑founder of the Lower Merion Historical Society, Douglas Macfarlan, marked “Williamson Hs. 1704” on one of his hand‑drawn maps at the Idlewild location — a clear acknowledgment of the Williamson family’s early presence in the area. What is documented with certainty is this:

- John Williamson (1789–1862) began his ownership of Idlewild in 1834. He added a springhouse (1860) at the base of the hill, used both as a cool place to store food and a water source. Upon his death in 1862, the farm was partitioned between his two sons, Garret and Samuel Williamson (1827–1911). Garret sold his share back to Samuel, who over the next few years added a carriage house, milkhouse, bull pen, and horse stable.
- Due to severe Civil War injuries, Samuel was eventually forced to give up active farming. 1897 — that is when Frances Baugh Saunders purchased 87 of Samuel G. Williamson’s remaining 104 acres of Idlewild.
- Yet, Samuel remained on Idlewild land and built a stately home by Mill Creek, called “Sunnyside,” located on Williamson Road, on acreage that had originally been part of Idlewild Farm. Both Idlewild and Sunnyside stand on what is now Williamson Road, named for the family who owned the land for more than a century.

== Saunders Times ==
In 1897, Frances Saunders (wife of medical publisher Walter Saunders) bought what was Idylwild Farm from Samuel Williamson. She bought only 87 of the remaining 104 acres (42 ha) of the farm. Around 1900, the farm was changed from a crop and horse farm to a dairy farm, using Ayrshire cows. Although they had a house in the Overbrook neighborhood of Philadelphia, the Saunders wanted a place to work and play during the summer months, for example, they dug a pool in 1924, which is still there today. Mrs. Saunders bought neighboring properties, increasing the size of the farm to 167 acres (68 ha), and tried to keep most of the buildings as original as possible. Although going deaf, she continued to work the farm until Walter deeded it over to his children, Lawrence and Emily, in 1927.

Lawrence Saunders, who had married Dorothy Love in 1924, moved onto the farm and began to work the dairy produce. In 1927, Lawrence began the Bridlewild Trails Association on the property. He also formed in 1951 the Saunders Foundation to maintain a plot called Saunders Woods, which he had bought in 1922. In 1968, Lawrence Saunders died, leaving the farm to his estate. Dorothy Saunders, his widow, bought the farm from his estate, along with 26 acres (11 ha). She wrote poetry, worked the farm, and enjoyed farm life. A book of poetry, titled "Unbroken Time" was written at Idlewild and published in 1982.

=== Natural Lands ===
In 1983 Idlewild Farm was entered on the National Register of Historic Places for Pennsylvania. In 1992 Mrs. Saunders gave both Saunders Woods and 21 acres (85,000 m^{2}) of Idlewild to Natural Lands, a nonprofit organization dedicated to land preservation and stewardship in southeastern Pennsylvania and southern New Jersey.
