= HealthShare Exchange =

Healthshare Exchange
- Abbreviation: HSX
- Formation: 2012; 14 years ago
- Type: Nonprofit Organization
- Location: Philadelphia, Pennsylvania, U.S.
- Region served: Delaware Valley and Greater Philadelphia
- Services: Health Information Exchange
- Staff: 1000-1500 employees
- Website: healthshareexchange.org

HealthShare Exchange (HSX) is a membership-dues-supported nonprofit health information exchange formed in 2009 and incorporated in 2012 by Greater Philadelphia's hospitals, health systems, and healthcare insurers.[1][2] It links the electronic medical record (EMR) systems of different hospital health systems and other healthcare providers — and the claims data of healthcare insurers — to make this information accessible at inpatient and outpatient points of care (including medical practice offices) and for care management. HSX services provide recent clinical care information, and alert providers and health plans to care events.[2] Health information exchange makes patient care more informed and coordinated, and reduces unnecessary care and readmissions. HSX serves the Philadelphia metropolitan area, including southeastern Pennsylvania and southern New Jersey.[2]

== Background ==
As a result of the federal Health Information Technology for Economic and Clinical Health Act and other regional healthcare drivers, local planning for HSX began in the summer of 2011. The Health Care Improvement Foundation (HCIF), a regional quality improvement non-profit organization, joined with hospitals, health plans, physicians, government representatives, and safety-net providers to explore how a formalized health information organization could enable better care for patients in the region.

Resulting from a number of healthcare market drivers and challenges, HealthShare Exchange was formed as a collaboration among major healthcare stakeholders, including health plans and the acute care hospitals across the five-county region of Bucks, Chester, Delaware, Montgomery, and Philadelphia counties.

In May 2016, HSX was awarded a portion of a $3.8 million grant by the Pennsylvania eHealth Partnership Authority, which receives its funding through the Centers for Medicare and Medicaid Services. The Centers for Medicare and Medicaid Services runs an EHR incentive program that requires its participants to exchange health data in order to receive incentive payments.

== Members ==
HSX members include hospitals, health systems, ambulatory care practices, behavioral health organizations, health plans, and post-acute care facilities.

=== Health systems and hospitals ===
As of October 2017, HSX health system and hospital members included:

- Crozer-Keystone Health System: Chester Medical Center, Delaware County Memorial Hospital, Springfield Hospital, & Taylor Hospital
- Doylestown Health: Doylestown Hospital
- Einstein Healthcare Network: Elkins Park, Montgomery, Philadelphia, & Moss Rehab
- Grand View Health: Grand View Hospital
- Hahnemann University Hospital
- Holy Redeemer: Holy Redeemer Hospital
- Jefferson Health: Abington Memorial Hospital, Abington Lansdale Hospital, Jefferson Hospital for Neuroscience, Methodist Hospital, Thomas Jefferson University Hospital, & Aria Health (Bucks, Frankford, and Torresdale Campuses)
- Main Line Health: Bryn Mawr Hospital, Lankenau Medical Center, Paoli Hospital, Riddle Hospital, & Bryn Mawr Rehab
- Penn Medicine: Chester County Hospital, Hospital of the University of Pennsylvania, Presbyterian Medical Center, Pennsylvania Hospital
- Physicians Care Surgical Hospital
- Prime Healthcare: Suburban Community Hospital, Roxborough Memorial Hospital, & Lower Bucks Hospital
- Rothman Orthopaedic Specialty Hospital
- St. Christopher's Hospital for Children
- Temple Health: Jeanes Hospital, Temple University Hospital, & Fox Chase Cancer Center
- The Children's Hospital of Philadelphia
- Trinity Health: St. Mary Medical Center & Mercy Health System (Mercy Fitzgerald, Mercy Philadelphia, and Nazareth Hospitals)

=== Health Plan Members ===
As of October 2017, HSX health plan members included:

- AmeriHealth Caritas
- AmeriHealth New Jersey
- Health Partners Plans
- Independence Blue Cross
