= Merion Station, Pennsylvania =

Unincorporated community in Pennsylvania, US

Merion Station Merion
- Census-designated place
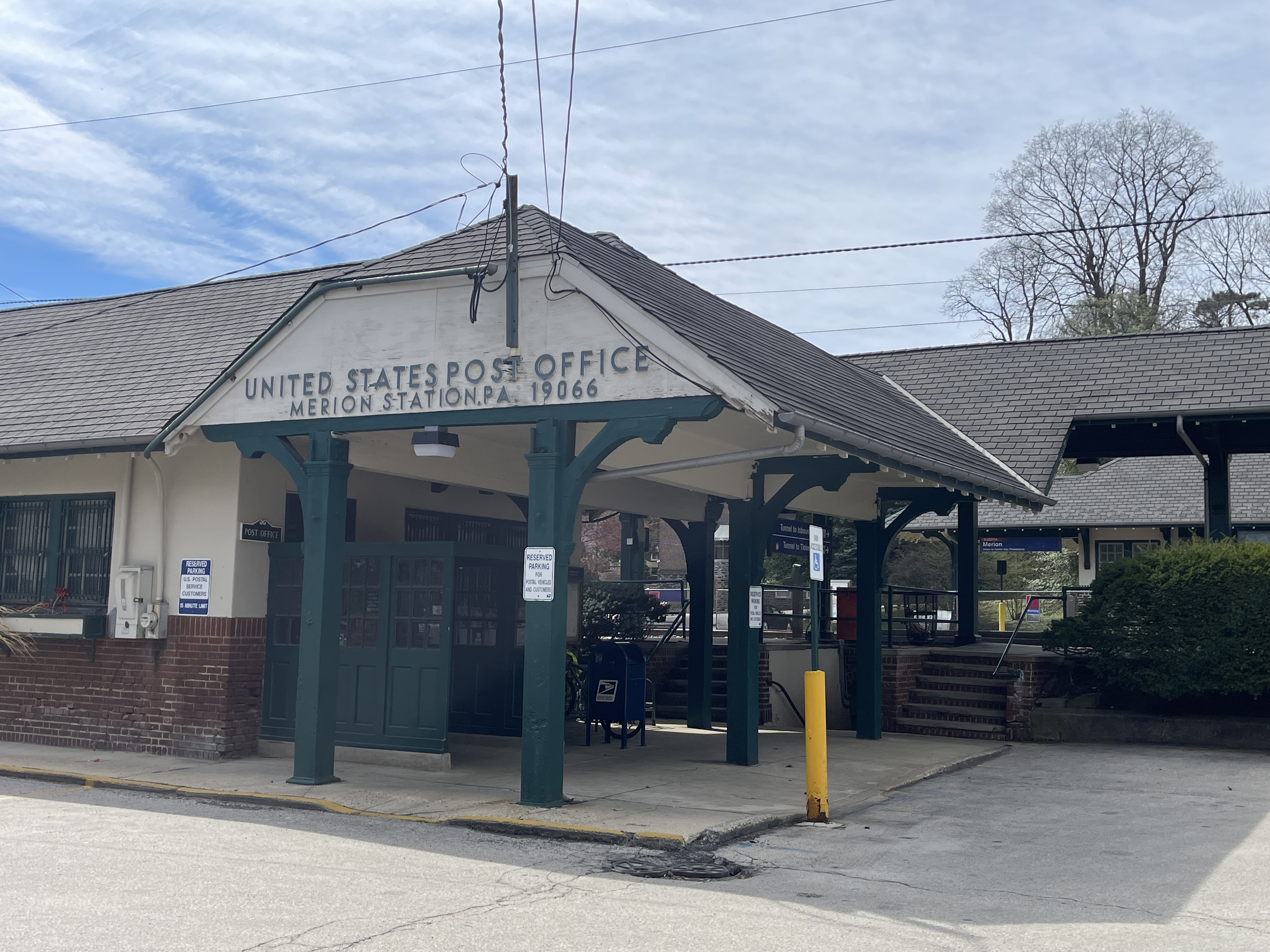
- Merion Station post office, which is part of the SEPTA Regional Rail station

- Location of Merion Station in Pennsylvania Merion Station (the United States)
- Coordinates: 39°59′36″N 75°15′04″W
- Country: United States
- State: Pennsylvania
- County: Montgomery
- Township: Lower Merion
- Elevation: 233 ft (71 m)

Population (2020)
  - Total: 5,741
- Time zone: UTC-5 (EST)
  - Summer (DST): UTC-4 (EDT)
- ZIP Code: 19066
- Area codes: 610 and 484

Merion Station, also known as Merion, is an unincorporated community in Montgomery County, Pennsylvania. It borders Philadelphia to its west and is one of the communities that make up the Philadelphia Main Line. Merion Station is within Lower Merion Township, Montgomery County. The community is known for its grand mansions and for the wealth of its residents.

Merion Station is contiguous to the Overbrook and Overbrook Park neighborhoods of Philadelphia and is also bordered by Lower Merion Township's unincorporated communities of Wynnewood and Bala Cynwyd and the borough of Narberth. As of the 2020 United States census the population was 5,741.

== History ==
Merion Meeting House was built at the present intersection of Montgomery Avenue and Meetinghouse Lane in 1695 by Welsh settlers.

The General Wayne Inn and Merion Friends Meeting House are listed on the National Register of Historic Places. The Merion Friends Meeting House is also a National Historic Landmark.

== Nomenclature ==
The community was named after Merionethshire, Wales, the native home of a large share of the first settlers. Merion is often referred to as "Merion Station," as this is the place name that the United States Postal Service recommends using in order to distinguish Merion from other areas in Pennsylvania with similar names. However, the historical name of the town, used by historical figures such as Theodore Roosevelt, is Merion.

== Merion Civic Association ==
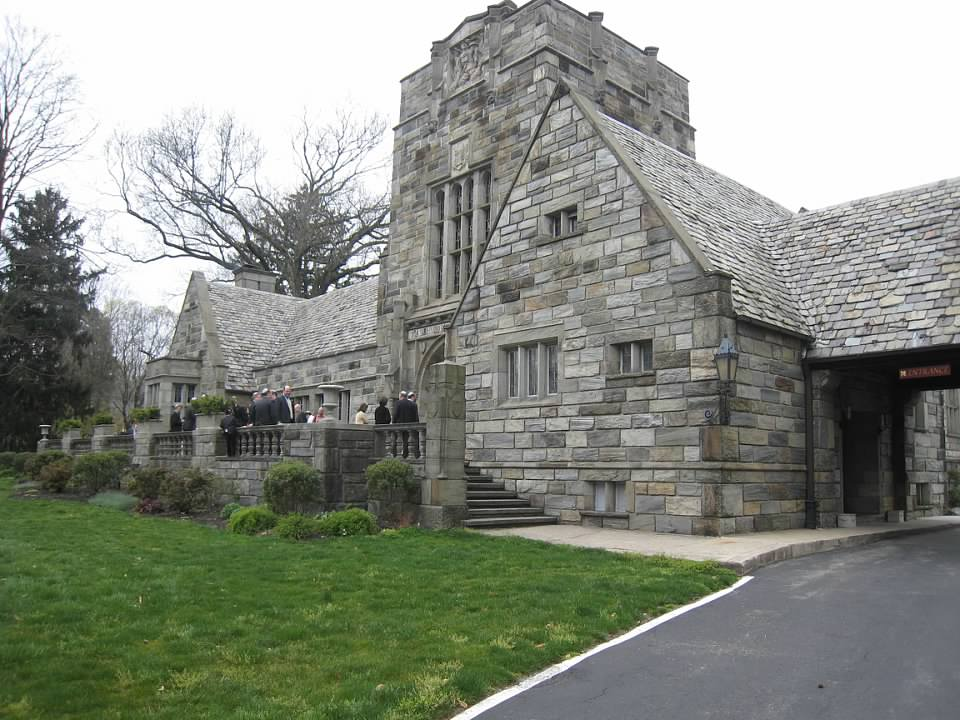
Merion Tribute House (April 2012)

The Merion Civic Association was organized in 1913 by Edward W. Bok with the motto "To be Nation right and State right, we must first be Community right." The Merion Civic Association made several important improvements to Merion such as paving, better lighting, cast-iron street signs, better fire and police protection, and planned tree-planting. President Theodore Roosevelt wrote an article in 1917 for Bok's magazine entitled "Model Merion."

After World War I, the Merion Civic Association sought to construct a community center in memorial to the 81 men from Merion Station who served in the armed forces during the conflict. Eldridge R. Johnson, the founder and president of the Victor Talking Machine Company, donated his house on Hazelhurst Avenue to this cause. The house was demolished and a new Merion Tribute House was built on its foundation. It was built with careful attention to detail, with Gothic patterns and local stone. The stone was shaped on site and window mullions were all hand cut to match. The Tribute House is still used today for meetings of the Merion Civic Association and is supported by renting the space for parties or meetings. Merion also has its own public elementary school—Merion Elementary of the Lower Merion School District on South Bowman Avenue.

== Institutions ==
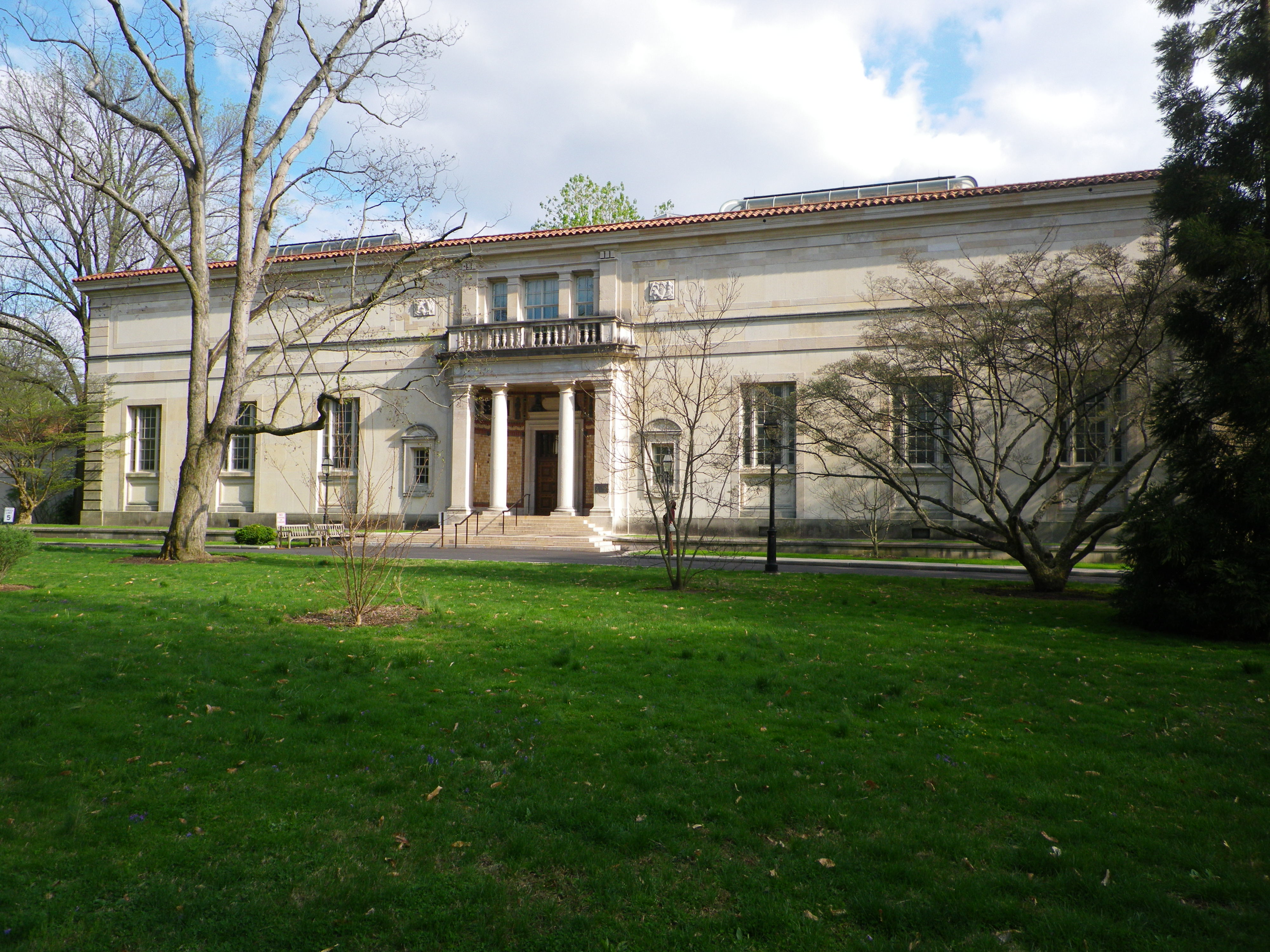
Barnes Foundation in Merion Station, April 2010

The institution for which Merion Station was particularly known for was the Barnes Foundation, an important art collection of Impressionist and Post-Impressionist paintings amassed by drug entrepreneur Albert C. Barnes that since the 1920s had been housed in a granite mansion with gardens on Latches Lane. The Barnes collection has been moved to a newly designed museum building on Benjamin Franklin Parkway in Center City Philadelphia that includes a replication of Barnes's original gallery in Merion. The Barnes Foundation Merion grounds remain open to the public as the Arboretum of the Barnes Foundation.

Merion Botanical Park is located between Merion Road and the railroad tracks and City Line Ave and Civic Center Drive.

== Education ==
The zoned school district is the Lower Merion School District. School zoning is as follows: Elementary schools with attendance boundaries covering portions of the CDP include: Merion Elementary School (the majority of the area), Cynwyd Elementary School, and Belmont Hills Elementary School. Almost all of the CDP is in the zone for Bala Cynwyd Middle School, while a portion is in Welsh Valley Middle School. All of the CDP is in a choice zone where students may choose between Harriton High School and Lower Merion High School.

In addition to the public schools, Catholic, all-girls Merion Mercy Academy and its feeder school, Catholic, coeducational Waldron Mercy Academy, and Kohelet Yeshiva High School, formerly Stern Hebrew High School, are located in Merion. Before its move to Bryn Mawr, Akiba Hebrew Academy was located in Merion as was Episcopal Academy prior to its consolidation in Newtown Square.

Saint Joseph's University straddles City Avenue. It also purchased and repurposed the former Episcopal Academy campus on the Merion Stationside of the Avenue to contain classroom and student activity buildings. The university bought and renovated Merion Gardens Apartments, at the northwest corner of the East Wynnewood Road/City Avenue intersection, for student housing.

== Transportation ==
The Paoli/Thorndale Line, originally part of the Pennsylvania Railroad, was built through Merion station in the late 19th century. Most SEPTA trains heading east to Philadelphia or west to Thorndale stop at Merion Station, located in the center of Merion Station.

Other public transportation options in Merion Station include the SEPTA Route 44 buses that travels along Old Lancaster Road and Montgomery Avenue between Ardmore and Center City, some of which stop at the Narberth Station; the SEPTA Route 65 bus that traverses the length of City Line Avenue; and the SEPTA Route 105 bus that runs the entire length of the Main Line along Lancaster Avenue (Route 30) and stops at the Wynnewood Shopping Center. All are within walking distance of Merion Station.

== Demographics and government ==
Merion Station is located in zipcode 19066. Lower Merion Township is responsible for all governance.

According to the 2000 U.S. census, Merion Station has 5,951 residents, 93.6% of whom are White; 2.1% are Black or African American; 2.7% are Asian; and 1.3% are Hispanic or Latino. 95.1% have a high school diploma or higher and 76.7% have a bachelor's degree or higher. 9.4% were born in a foreign country. 12.3% speak a language other than English at home, and out of that percentage the number that speak Hebrew at home is 10.1%. The median household income in 1999 was $103,229, and 2.7% of individuals were below the poverty line.

== Faith communities ==
Merion Station has a comparatively large Jewish population and serves as home to Temple Adath Israel of the Main Line, a Conservative Jewish congregation. Its Orthodox Jewish population is served by Lower Merion Synagogue on Old Lancaster Road, Aish HaTorah on Montgomery Avenue, Young Israel of the Main Line on Montgomery Avenue, and the Chabad Center of the Main Line, located in the former General Wayne Inn on Montgomery Avenue. Reform Jews in Merion are likely to travel a mile west up Montgomery Avenue to Main Line Reform Temple-Beth Elohim, to Gladwyne's Beth David Congregation, or to Congregation Rodeph Shalom on North Broad Street in Center City.

== Shopping ==
The main commercial area of Merion Station is located along Montgomery Avenue east and west of its intersection with Old Lancaster Road and extends into neighboring Bala Cynwyd, officially known as the Merion-Cynwyd Commercial District. It includes restaurants, gift shops and other stores, and local landmarks more than a half century old whose reputations extend well beyond Merion Station's limits, notably Hymie's Merion Delicatessen, The Tavern Restaurant, Murray's Delicatessen, Babis's Pharmacy, Bob Wark's Liberty Service Station, and the Township Cleaners.

== Hospitals ==
Merion Station is served by Lankenau Medical Center, which is part of the larger Main Line Health System that includes Bryn Mawr Hospital and Paoli Hospital. Lankenau, on Lancaster Avenue (U.S. Route 30) in nearby Wynnewood near the Overbrook border, has traditionally been affiliated with either Jefferson or Hahnemann (now Drexel) colleges of medicine and is always (with Bryn Mawr and Paoli) on the list of the nation's top community hospitals. The Lankenau Hospital campus includes affiliated doctors' office and medical services in Medical Building East, Medical Build West and Saunders House, a rehabilitation facility, is located adjacent to Lankenau Hospital.

== Neighborhoods ==
The community north of Montgomery Avenue surrounding General Wayne Park is usually referred to as Merion Park and is in the same zipcode as Merion Station. It was built by developer Ralph Madway decades after the closing of the General Wayne Racetrack that once drew thousands of spectators to Merion for horse races on the green now the Park's grounds and bounded by Maplewood and Revere Roads.

== Notable people ==
- Edward Bok, magazine editor and publisher
- Wendell P. Bowman, Pennsylvania National Guard major general
- Kate DiCamillo, author
- Sophie Drinker, musicologist
- Ted Eisenberg, Guinness World Record-holding breast surgeon and professional knife thrower
- Rob Evans, Christian children's songwriter and performer
- Murray Gerstenhaber, mathematician and law professor
- Eldridge R. Johnson, founder of the Victor Talking Machine Company
- Jack Jones, journalist and television news anchor
- Melissa Klapper, historian and storyteller
- Paul Makler Jr., Olympic fencer
- Chaim Potok, author
- Milton Shapp, former Pennsylvania governor
- Georg Ludwig von Trapp and his family, life fictionalized in The Sound of Music
- Joseph Lapsley Wilson, military officer, railroad executive and horticulturalist

== Points of interest ==
- The Arboretum of the Barnes Foundation
- Barnes Foundation
- General Wayne Inn
- Merion Friends Meeting House, oldest in Pennsylvania and second oldest in the United States
