= MossRehab =

Physical rehab facility in Philadelphia

- Einstein Healthcare Network

Geography
- Location: 60 Township Line Road, Elkins Park, Philadelphia, Pennsylvania, United States
- Coordinates: 40.072665°N 75.105316°W

Organization
- Religious affiliation: Jewish

History
- Opened: early 1900s (part of Jewish Hospital), 1952 (independent)

Links
- Lists: Hospitals in Pennsylvania

Jefferson Moss-Magee Rehabilitation - Elkins Park (formerly MossRehab) is a physical medicine and rehabilitation hospital serving the Greater Philadelphia region of Pennsylvania. The rehabilitation hospital was founded in the early 1900s and would go through a series of name changes and mergers to become Jefferson Moss-Magee Rehabilitation.

== History ==
Named after philanthropist Lucien Moss, grandson of John Moss, the Lucien Moss Home for Incurables of the Jewish Faith was founded by the Jewish Hospital Association of Philadelphia in June 1900. The Moss Home initially accepted patients with advanced cases of tuberculosis but would go on to welcome patients with other chronic illnesses during the years to come. In 1928, Frank H. Krusen founded the Department of Rehabilitation at Temple University, which became home to the Jefferson Moss-Magee Rehabilitation physical medicine and rehabilitation residency program.

In 1961, the Moss Home moved from its original location, where it had been since the early 1900s, into a building with 124 beds in North Philadelphia on Tabor Road. Eventually, the Moss Home became known as Moss Rehabilitation. Between 1961 and 1964, the Moss Home became a stroke evaluation and care clinic. After this, it helped develop the field of physical rehabilitation and officially changed its name to MossRehab.

MossRehab established a Rehabilitation Training Center in 1970 and appointed Dorothea Glass, MD, as its medical director. Glass was one of the first women to achieve this type of leadership role in rehabilitation.

In 1974, MossRehab began a driver training program to teach people with disabilities how to drive safely and independently. MossRehab encourages accessibility through programs such as Camp Independence, a week long camp for adults with physical disabilities; the Clubhouse, a program for people experiencing disabilities after brain injuries; and Young Empowerment Stroke Support Group known as the YESS program, a support system for stroke survivors under the age of 65. MossRehab also participates in They Will Surf Again a day-long event located in Wildwood, New Jersey, that helps people with disabilities experience surfing.

== Medical Milestones and Innovations ==
The following is a list of the most significant milestones for MossRehab:

- The Drucker Brain Injury Center: The Philadelphia region's first center dedicated to helping people with traumatic brain injuries was founded in the 1980s.
- The Moss Rehabilitation Research Institute – Founded in 1992 in order to organize research occurring at MossRehab and start new initiatives. The program focuses on cognitive neuroscience and rehabilitation, traumatic brain injury treatment and outcomes, and movement science and mobility rehabilitation.
- ReWalk: In 2009, MossRehab launched the first clinical trials for a wearable motorized robotic exoskeleton. ReWalk is worn around the legs and back to help patients recovering from spinal cord injuries walk again.
- The New Accessible Icon: In 2014, MossRehab became the first healthcare facility to adopt.
- Dixie James Becoming the President and COO: In 2019, MossRehab appointed Dixie James President and Chief Operating Officer. James is the first African American woman to have this position.
- All About Art: In a way to cope with being diagnosed with disabilities, MossRehab created the All About Art program for patients to create art that will be displayed at MossRehab.

== Awards ==
In 1993, MossRehab was listed on the inaugural list of U.S. News & World Report's "Best Hospitals for Rehabilitation". It has since been on the list for 25 years and ranked in the top ten for the past decade.

In 2019, MossRehab, along with other Einstein Hospitals and Rehabilitation Centers, gained Magnet recognition, which is the highest honor a healthcare organization can receive for nursing excellence.

Accreditation from the Commission on Accreditation of Rehabilitation Facilities, CARF, was awarded to 15 MossRehab programs over a three-year period.

9 MossRehab Physicians have been named to the Philly Magazine's Top Docs list in 2020.

== Other Locations ==
In addition to its campuses in Elkins Park and Center City Philadelphia, Jefferson Moss-Magee Rehabilitation has inpatient units located on-site at various hospitals throughout the region, including:

- Jefferson Einstein Philadelphia Hospital
- Doylestown Hospital
- Jefferson Bucks Hospital
- Jefferson Frankford Hospital

Jefferson Moss-Magee Rehabilitation also has 35 outpatient locations throughout the region.
