= Health Partners Plans =

- Company type: Medicaid; Medicare; CHIP
- Industry: Healthcare
- Founded: 1984
- Headquarters: Pennsylvania
- Key people: Denise Croce (President and CEO)
- Number of employees: 900+
- Parent: Jefferson Health
- Website: www.healthpartnersplans.com

Health Partners Plans (HPP) is a non-profit hospital-owned health maintenance organization which provides Medicaid and Medicare to central and southeastern Pennsylvania residents. Health Partners Plans has over 262,000 members throughout Pennsylvania and provides healthcare to low income residents in the counties of Bucks, Chester, Delaware, Lancaster, Lehigh, Montgomery, Northampton and Philadelphia.

== History ==
Health Partners Plans was founded in 1984 and is one of the few hospital-owned health maintenance organizations. The organization had been owned jointly by Jefferson Health, Einstein Healthcare Network and Temple University Health System, but Jefferson Health became the sole owner of Health Partners Plans in November 2021.

In 2019, Health Partners Plans CEO, Bill George, retired as CEO and was replaced by Denise Croce. George joined the company in 1991 as CFO and became CEO in 2006. HPP opened a new building, the Community Wellness Center, in West Philadelphia with the goal of "encouraging community members to take charge of their health". Health Partners Plans filed a lawsuit against Reading Health Partners LLC that year.

In 2019, Health Partners Plans began offering a medically tailored meal delivery program which improved both the outcome and lowered the cost of supporting clients with chronic disease.

== See also ==
- Keystone First
