= Loretta Sweet Jemmott =

American nursing professor

- Born: West Philadelphia, Pennsylvania, U.S.
- Spouse: John B. Jemmott III (m. 1989)

Academic background
- Education: Hampton University; University of Pennsylvania

Academic work
- Discipline: Nursing
- Sub-discipline: HIV/AIDS prevention
- Institutions: University of Pennsylvania; Drexel University; Villanova University

Loretta Sweet Jemmott is an American nursing professor and researcher, known for her contributions to HIV/AIDS prevention. She was elected to the National Academy of Medicine in 1999. She was a professor of nursing and the vice president for health and health equity at Drexel University from 2015–2024. She moved to Villanova University in 2025, where she was appointed with the M. Louise Endowed Professorship in Nursing.

== Early life and education ==
Loretta Sweet was born in West Philadelphia to a working-class family. She was bused to attend an all-white elementary school, one of the city's first to be racially integrated. She graduated from Overbrook High School in 1973; she was student body president.

She received her bachelor's degree in nursing in 1978 from Hampton University (then known as Hampton Institute), a historically black college in Virginia. She received her master's in nursing and PhD in sexuality education from the University of Pennsylvania.

== Career ==
Her first nursing job was at a high-risk pregnancy unit in Pennsylvania Hospital. She then worked at a clinic providing sex education for teenagers.

In 1992, she won the Governor's Nursing Merit Award in Professional Advanced Practice for her work in AIDS education and research. She worked as an assistant professor in maternal child nursing at Rutgers University, and was a visiting scholar through the University of Michigan's Kings-Chavez-Parks program. She and her husband John B. Jemmott III created a HIV prevention program designed to reach youth in urban settings, known as the Jemmott Intervention or "Be Proud! Be Responsible!", was selected for inclusion in a nationwide curriculum the Centers for Disease Control in 1994. Within a year, it had been adopted in 26 states and some Caribbean countries. She presented the initiative at the New Jersey Nursing Convention in 2000.

In 2015, she became a professor of nursing and the vice president for health and health equity at Drexel University. The same year, she was also appointed to Main Line Health's board of governors.

She gave the 2024 commencement address at the Rutgers School of Nursing–Camden.

In March 2025, she was appointed to the M. Louise Endowed Professorship in Nursing at Villanova University.

== Honors and awards ==
She was elected to the National Academy of Medicine in 1999. She received the M. Louise Fitzpatrick Award for Transformative Leadership in 2023. She was recognized with the American Academy of Nursing's Civitas Award in 2024.

== Personal life ==
Her husband is John B. Jemmott III, the Kenneth B. Clark Professor of Communication and Psychiatry at the University of Pennsylvania. They married in 1989.
