= Einstein Healthcare Network =

Private non-profit healthcare organization in Pennsylvania

- Company type: Non-profit healthcare
- Industry: Healthcare, hospitals
- Founded: 1866
- Headquarters: Philadelphia, Pennsylvania, U.S.
- Services: Primary, secondary, and tertiary care centers; ambulatory clinics
- Website: www.einstein.edu

Einstein Healthcare Network is a private non-profit healthcare organization part of Jefferson Health based in the Philadelphia, Pennsylvania. The healthcare network serves Greater Philadelphia and its flagship hospital is Einstein Medical Center, a safety net hospital, located in Philadelphia. The healthcare network offers residency and fellowship training programs in many specialized areas, including pharmacy practice. The healthcare network has a combine total of 1,044 beds and has over 8,500 employees.

== Locations ==
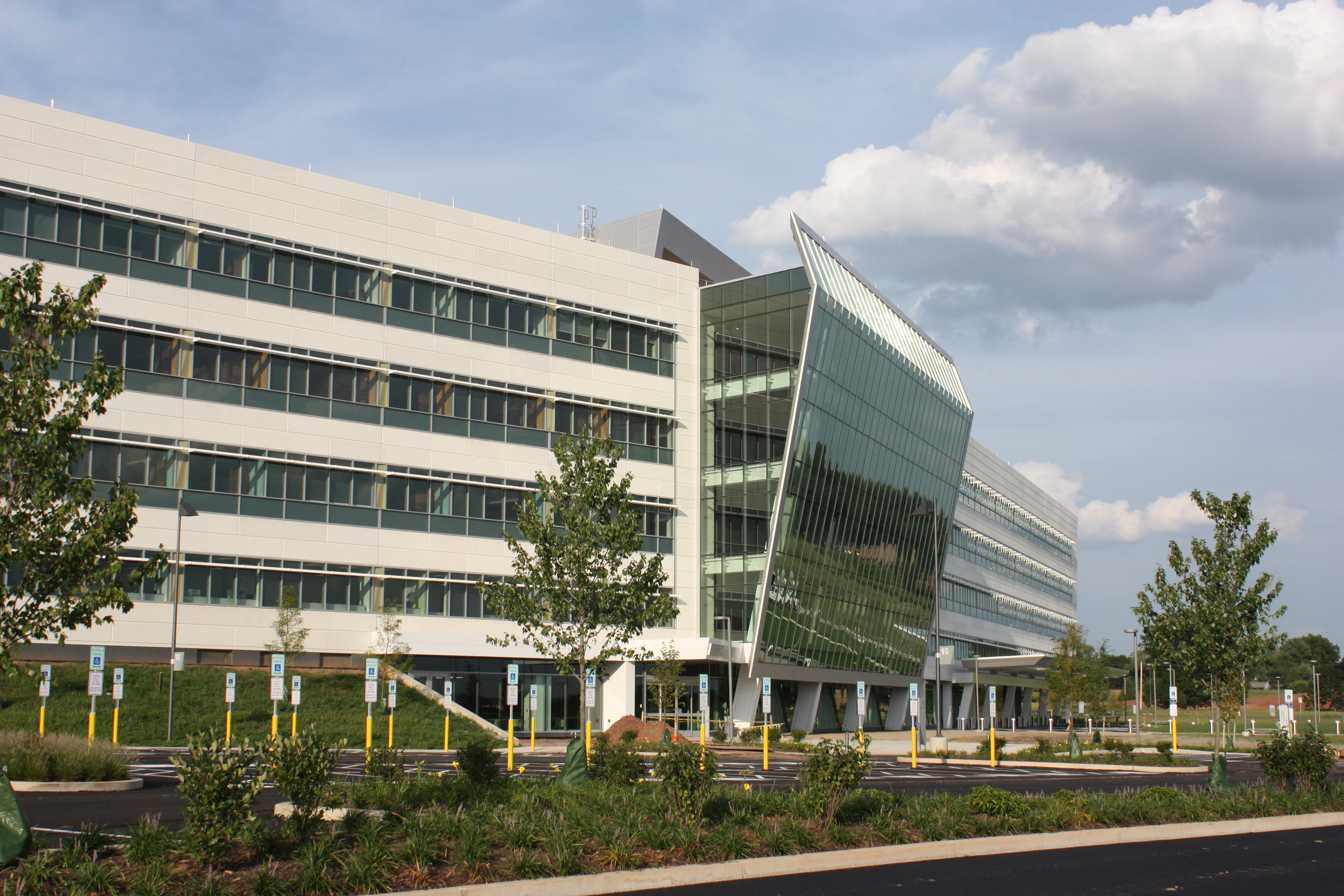
Einstein Medical Center Montgomery in East Norriton Township

Albert Einstein Healthcare Network operates the following hospitals:

- Einstein Medical Center Philadelphia in the Logan section of North Philadelphia
- Einstein Medical Center Elkins Park in Elkins Park
- Einstein Medical Center Montgomery in East Norriton Township
- MossRehab in Elkins Park

Einstein Healthcare Network also operates outpatient centers in the Philadelphia neighborhoods of Bustleton, Germantown, Holmesburg, and Logan. Outside of Philadelphia, it has outpatient centers in the suburban Philadelphia communities of Blue Bell, Collegeville, East Norriton Township, King of Prussia, Lansdale, Norristown, and Plymouth Meeting.

== History ==
=== 19th century ===
Einstein Medical Center was built in 1864 as Jewish Hospital for the Aged, Infirmed and Destitute also known as the Jewish Hospital. The hospital had a goal to provide medical care to "the sick and wounded without regard to creed, color or nationality". Einstein Medical Center officially opened in 1866 with 22 beds at 56th and Haverford Road in West Philadelphia. The hospital expanded, moving to Old York Road in 1873, and opening various homes and clinics.

=== 20th century ===
By the 20th century, Jewish-sponsored hospitals such as the Jewish Hospital became havens for Jewish doctors who could not admit their patients to other hospitals because of anti-Semitism.

In 1951, volunteer president of Mount Sinai wrote a letter asking physicist Albert Einstein for permission to use his name as a part of the hospital. Einstein gave them permission in a letter dated June 28, 1951. In 1952, the Jewish hospital merged with Northern Liberties Hospital and Mount Sinai Hospital to form a single medical center.

During the 1990s, Einstein Medical Network combined with MossRehab.

=== 21st century ===
In 2018, Einstein Healthcare reached a conclusive agreement to merge with Jefferson Health. The merger would create an 18-hospital system and garner $5.9 billion in revenue including over "50 outpatient and urgent-care centers, leading rehabilitation and post-acute facilities" and maintain almost 39,000 employees. The hospital systems retained their original names, and donations to Einstein would remain at Einstein.

In 2018, Jefferson Health was second-largest hospital network in Pennsylvania with 2,885 beds.

== See also ==
- List of hospitals in Philadelphia
