= Andrea Clearfield =

American composer

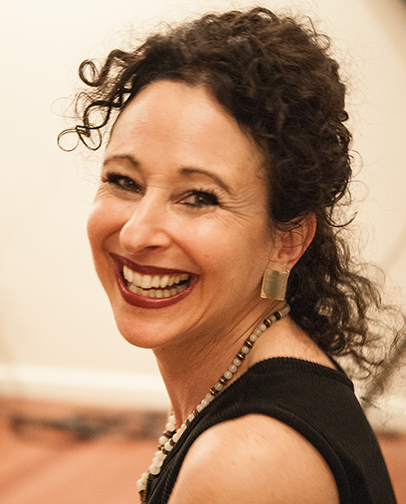
Andrea Clearfield, photo by Vanessa Freire

Andrea Clearfield (born 1960) is an American composer of contemporary classical music. Her works include music for opera, orchestra, chorus, soloists, chamber ensembles, dance, film, and multimedia collaborations.

== Biography ==
=== Early life ===
Clearfield was born on August 29, 1960, in Philadelphia, Pennsylvania, and grew up in Bala-Cynwyd, a suburb of Philadelphia. She was raised in an artistic family and studied piano from age 5. She began exploring composition as a young teen, arranging pop songs for voice, strings and percussion.

=== Training ===
Clearfield graduated from Muhlenberg College where she met her mentor, composer Margaret Garwood. She later earned am M.M. in Piano from the Philadelphia College of Performing Arts (later renamed University of the Arts) and a D.M.A. in composition from Temple University.

=== Career ===
Clearfield's catalog includes works for orchestra, opera, chorus, chamber ensemble, dance, and multimedia collaborations. She has composed for many notable ensembles, including The Philadelphia Orchestra. Clearfield was on the composition and interdisciplinary arts faculty at the University of the Arts from 1986 to 2011. She founded The Salon, a performance series in her home featuring contemporary, classical, jazz, electronic, dance, and world music since 1986.

== Compositional style ==
Clearfield has been recognized by music critic David Patrick Stearns as having "a considerable history of handling large-scale choral and orchestral forces that are a forum for social issues but also have artistic texture that gives them staying power." Among her works are seventeen cantatas including Kabo Omowale (Welcome Home, Child) commissioned and premiered by The Philadelphia Orchestra in collaboration with writer and storyteller Charlotte Blake Alston. Other works, including her choral cantata Tse Go La, are inspired by Tibetan music fieldwork that she conducted in the Nepalese Himalaya. Her opera, MILA, Great Sorcerer (Jean-Claude van Itallie and Lois Walden, libretto), explores the life of the great Tibetan sage, Milarepa, who transformed from mass murderer into Tibet's most venerated teacher. The opera was presented at the NYC Prototype Festival in 2019.

== Salon performance series ==
In September 1986, Clearfield founded The Salon, a performance series modeled after 19th-century European salons and hosted in her home. In March 2020, when the global pandemic paused in-person gatherings, Clearfield created Zalon, an online version of the Salon, allowing artists and audiences to connect from their homes via Zoom. When in-person salon gatherings resumed, performances continued to be broadcast online, creating a hybrid event known as the Szalon. The series has been heralded as "one of the best-known music salons in the country" and "an underground sensation" with a "deep bench of topflight musicians" (The Philadelphia Inquirer). It was awarded the "Best of Philly Award 2008″ by Philadelphia Magazine.

Clearfield has served as curator, MC, organizer and advisor for numerous new Salons including Mozart: Reloaded (a jazz and classical multimedia Salon at the Kimmel Center); The Salon Aspen Colorado; Main Line Reform Temple Salon in Wynnewood, Pa; Salon at the Garden in Scottsdale, AZ; Salon at Jay Heritage Center in Rye, NY; Intercultural Salon for the Interfaith Center of Philadelphia; 1917 Music and Dance Salon at the National Museum of American Jewish History; and One Book, One Jewish Community Salon.

== Awards and fellowships ==
Clearfield was awarded a Lifetime Achievement Award from the Musical Fund Society in May, 2025. She received a 2021 Pew International Residency Award, a 2016 Pew Fellowship in the Arts, two Independence Foundation Fellowships, two Rockefeller Foundation's Bellagio Center Fellowships (2012 and 2024), and fellowships from the American Academy in Rome, Yaddo, The MacDowell Colony, The Helene Wurlitzer Foundation of New Mexico, and Copland House, among others. She has served as artist-in-residence at Ragdale, Virginia Center for the Creative Arts, Civitella, Djerassi, I-Park Foundation, Marble House Project, Montalvo, Visby International Centre for Composers, Blue Mountain Center, Ucross, UCLA Herb Alpert School of Music, University of New Mexico, and Western Colorado University. Additional funders include the National Endowment for the Arts, ASCAP, the Leeway Foundation, the American Music Center (now New Music USA), the American Composers Forum, the Pennsylvania Council on the Arts, Meet the Composer, and the International Alliance for Women in Music.

== Press and critical reception ==
Clearfield has been praised by The New York Times for her "graceful tracery and lively, rhythmically vital writing," the Philadelphia Inquirer for her "mastery with large choral and instrumental forces," the Los Angeles Times for her "fluid, glistening" orchestration, and Opera News for her "vivid and galvanizing" music of "timeless beauty."
