= Temple Adath Israel of the Main Line =

Conservative synagogue in Pennsylvania

- Hebrew: עדת ישראל
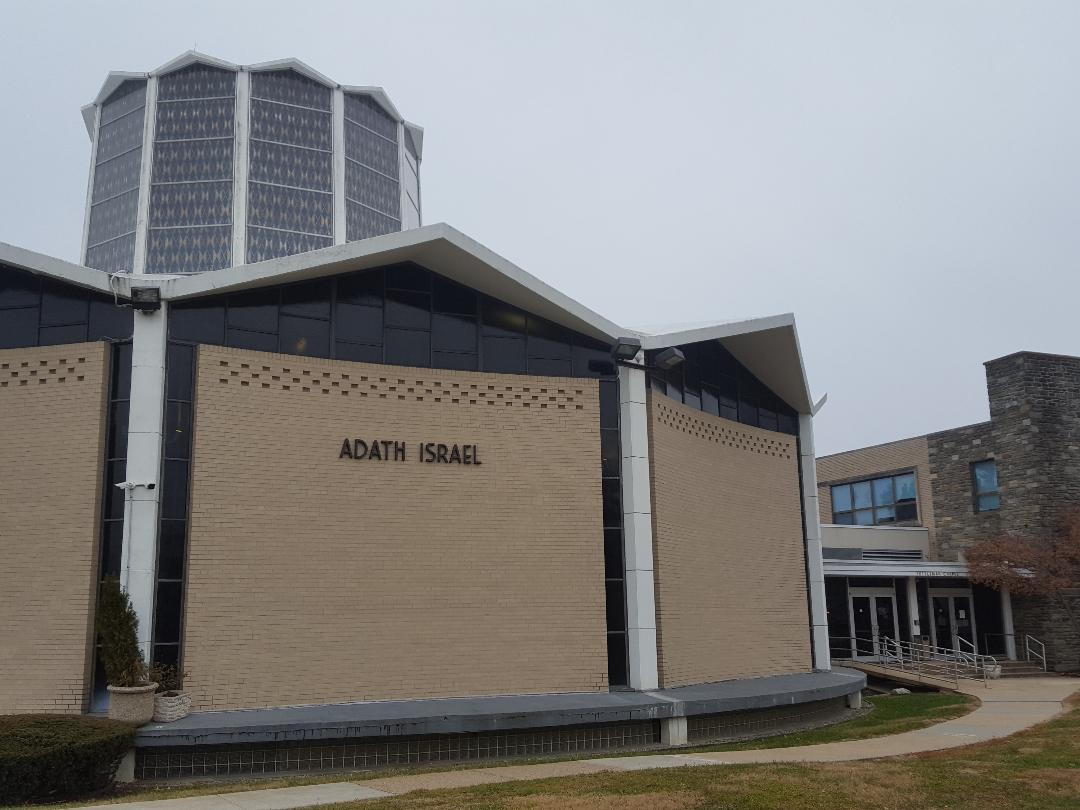
- Temple Adath Israel, in 2019

- Location in Pennsylvania

Religion
- Affiliation: Conservative Judaism
- Ecclesiastical or organizational status: Synagogue
- Leadership: Rabbi Eric Yanoff; Rabbi Andrew Markowitz
- Status: Active

Location
- Location: 250 N Highland Ave, Merion Station, Pennsylvania 19066
- Country: United States
- Interactive map of Temple Adath Israel of the Main Line
- Administration: United Synagogue of Conservative Judaism
- Coordinates: 39°59′58″N 75°14′43″W

Architecture
- Architects: Pietro Belluschi; Charles Frederick Wise
- Type: Synagogue
- Style: Modernist
- General contractor: Wohlsen (2014)
- Established: 1946 (Haverford congregation)
- Completed: 1954 (Old Lancaster Road); 1959 (N Highland Avenue)
- Construction cost: $750,000 (1958)
- Capacity: 1,400 (1959 – 2014)

Website
- www.adathisrael.org

Temple Adath Israel of the Main Line (Hebrew: עדת ישראל) is a Conservative synagogue located in Merion, Pennsylvania, United States. The synagogue offers religious services, pre-school, Hebrew Sunday school, adult education, and community programming. It was founded in 1946 and moved to its current location in 1953. The congregation serves approximately 750 families. Rabbi Eric Yanoff has served as rabbi since 2010, and Rabbi Andrew Markowitz has served as rabbi since 2018.

== Main Line Hebrew Association ==
Adath Israel traces its history to March 1936 when ten local businessmen founded the Main Line Hebrew Association, the Main Line's first Jewish congregation. The group represented 30 families and together pooled $600 in cash. Its mission was to "worship Almighty God according to the doctrines, creed and customs of the Hebraic faith."

== Founding and building ==
Temple Adath Israel was chartered in 1946 and held its first congregational meeting on September 29, 1946, at 515 Lancaster Avenue in Haverford where it also held its first services. Rabbi Martin Berkowitz came to the synagogue in 1947 and membership exceeded 400 families by 1949. The congregation rented space in the Ardmore YMCA building, the Ardmore Women's Club building, and in rooms on the campuses of Haverford College and Bryn Mawr College. The congregation purchased a large house at 410 Montgomery Avenue in Wynnewood which it renovated for services.

Adath Israel continued to grow and the congregation purchased seven acres (two point eight hectares) at Old Lancaster Road and Highland Avenue in Merion in 1953 on the former site of Rose Hill, the estate owned by Charles Elmer Hires. The official ground breaking took place in May 1953; Ambassador to the United States Abba Eban spoke at the ceremony. Solicitor General of the United States Simon Sobeloff presided over the laying of the building's cornerstone on June 13, 1954 and Rabbi Theodore Gordon of Main Line Reform Temple delivered the invocation. The congregation constructed and opened its Ralph Bodek Chapel, 900-seat Meyers Girsh Auditorium and 23-classroom educational building in time for the High Holidays that year.

The congregation retained architects Pietro Belluschi and Charles Frederick Wise who designed the new sanctuary in 1956 and 1957. The synagogue laid the cornerstone for the sanctuary on November 23, 1958. Philadelphia mayor Richard Dilworth spoke at the ceremony, and was joined by former Senator Herbert H. Lehman and Governor Theodore McKeldin of Maryland. The new George Friedland sanctuary sat 1400 and was dedicated on September 11, 1959, along with the Charles Tabas Auditorium and six additional classrooms.

The sanctuary features a rooftop cupola and a 12-sided structure as the centerpiece that rises 36 feet above the sanctuary, symbolizing 12 tribes of Israel.

Main Line Reform Temple Beit Elohim was founded in 1952 by young couples as the area's first Reform congregation. The congregation held Sunday School and Sabbath services at the Haverford Friends School on Buck Lane. When Adath Israel moved from 410 Montgomery Avenue to Merion in 1954, Main Line Reform purchased the property from Adath Israel and used the building for its own services. Main Line Reform constructed its current sanctuary and classroom buildings at the Montgomery Avenue site in 1960. During construction, Adath Israel welcomed Main Line Reform which shared Adath Israel's building for its own services, community events, and Hebrew school.

== History ==
Adath Israel had grown to 900 families with a real estate value of US$2,000,000 (equivalent to $20,432,946 in 2025) in 1965.

The congregation introduced the Temple Adath Israel Day School in 1971 offering an integrated Jewish and secular elementary school program beginning with a kindergarten in 1971 with plans for additional grades to be added each year. It would grow to fourth grade before closing in 1975. Students were absorbed by and enrolled in the Solomon Schechter Day School. On September 11, 1976, the congregation celebrated its 30th anniversary with a ball featuring comedian and actor Alan King.

On November 9, 1981, a fire ravaged Dropsie College for Hebrew and Cognate Learning's building at Broad and York Streets in Philadelphia. In December 1983, Adath Israel welcomed the school which moved into its education building rent-free.

In the early 1990s, Akiba Hebrew Academy relocated its Middle School across N Highland Avenue to the Adath Israel school building for two years.

The synagogue has long welcomed prominent leaders to address its congregation. Former prime minister of Israel Shimon Peres spoke at the synagogue on May 3, 1997.

Congregation Beth T'fillah of Overbrook Park merged with Adath Israel in 2006. Suburban Jewish Community Center-Bnai Aaron in Havertown closed in 2010 and merged with Adath Israel.

Adath Israel undertook a renovation of its building in 2014. AOS Architects redesigned the sanctuary with a new ark, moveable bimah, and incorporated new lighting and audio.

The synagogue numbered 750 member families in January 2025, and the Hebrew school had grown to 120 students from 75 in 2021.

In November 2025, Adath Israel joined with United Hatzalah of Israel to welcome Eden Golan, Israel's 2024 Eurovision Contestant, to perform at the synagogue in front of 700 attendees.

== Leadership ==
Martin Berkowitz served as senior rabbi at the synagogue from 1947 through 1981. Rabbi Berkwoitz was active in the wider Philadelphia community, producing and hosting a television program, "Faith of Israel" which aired on KYW-TV in the 1960s, and "Subject - Jewish Affairs" on WFIL beginning in 1971 on the state of Jews in the Soviet Union.

Rabbi David L. Kline was named assistant rabbi of the congregation in 1972.

Rabbi Berkowitz was succeeded by Rabbi Fred Kazan as senior rabbi. Rabbi Steven Wernick followed Rabbi Kazan and held the position from 2002 until 2009 when he was appointed Executive Vice President/CEO of the United Synagogue of Conservative Judaism's Rabbinical Assembly. Eric Yanoff has served as senior rabbi at Adath Israel since 2010.

Bernard Lowe served as cantor from 1992 until his retirement in 2017. Ariella Rosen served as one of the congregation's rabbis from 2015 until 2018. Rabbi Andrew Markowitz came to Adath Israel in 2018 and currently serves as one of the congregation's rabbis. Elizabeth Shammash has served as Cantor since 2020.
