= General Wayne Inn =

Historic former tavern in Merion, Pennsylvania

- U.S. National Register of Historic Places
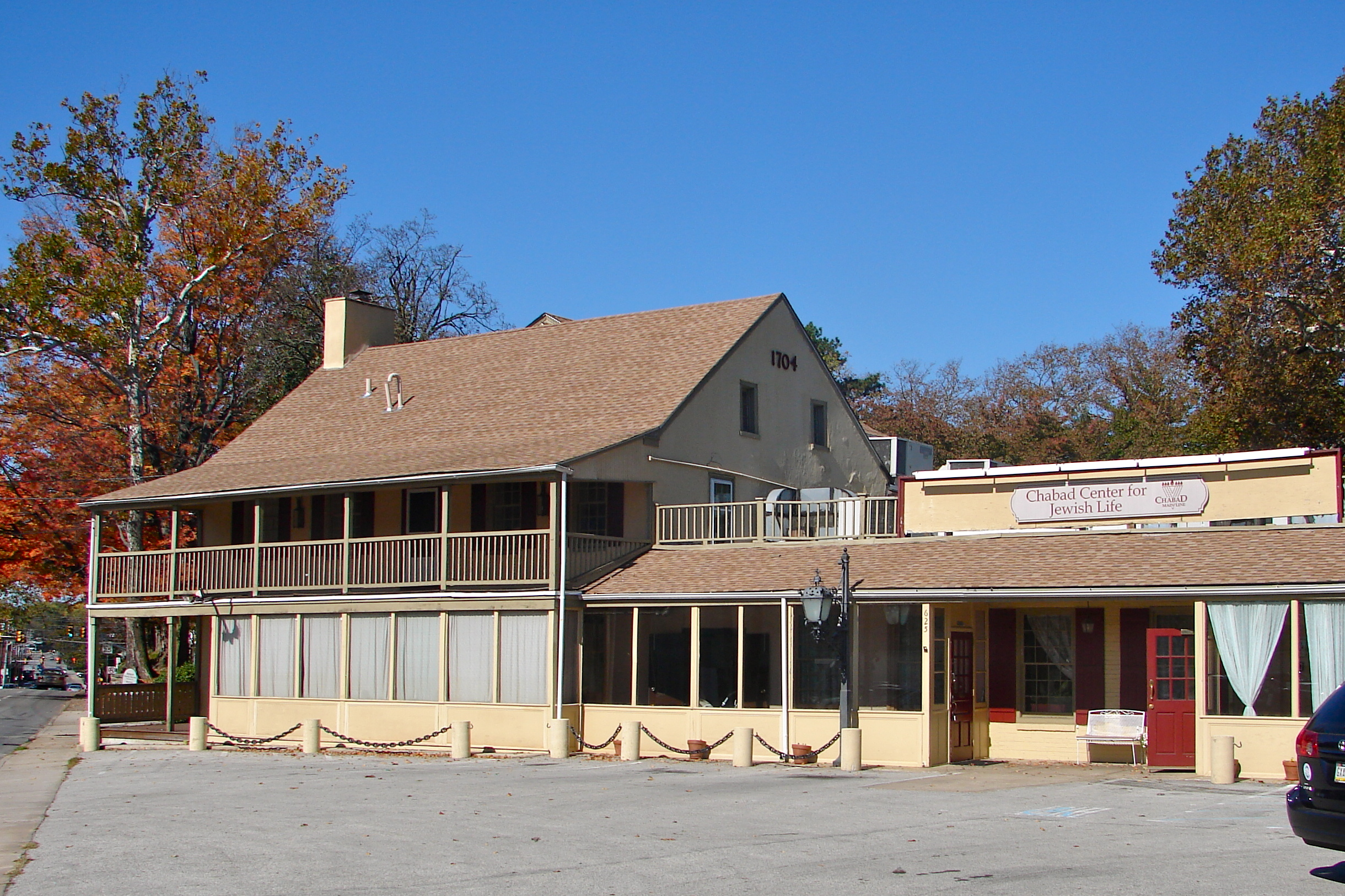

- Location within Pennsylvania Location within the United States
- Location: 625 Montgomery Avenue, Merion Station, Pennsylvania, U.S.
- Coordinates: 40°0′33″N 75°15′13″W
- Built: 1704
- NRHP reference No.: 76001655
- Added to NRHP: January 1, 1976

The General Wayne Inn is a former tavern and, since 2005, an Orthodox Jewish synagogue, located at 625 Montgomery Avenue in Merion Station, Pennsylvania, in the United States.

The building was placed on the National Register of Historic Places in 1976.

== Tavern history ==
Established as a tavern in 1704, it was previously named the William Penn Inn, Wayside Inn, Tunis Ordinary, and Streepers Tavern before being renamed in 1793 in honor of American Revolutionary War hero General "Mad" Anthony Wayne, who had once stayed there.

The Inn later gained fame for rumors of being "haunted".

=== Murder and suicide ===
Executive chef James Edwin “Jim” Webb and his business partner Guy Angelo Sileo Jr. bought the General Wayne in 1995. Webb was found murdered there in his office on December 27, 1996. Felicia Moyse, a 20-year-old assistant chef at the inn and Sileo's girlfriend, committed suicide on February 22, 1997.

Moyse had been an alibi witness for Sileo. On the night of the murder, she and Sileo left the General Wayne at the same time, driving to dinner in their separate vehicles. Sileo doubled back, killed Webb using a .25 Beretta Model 20 pistol later linked to him by forensic evidence, then rushed to arrive at dinner before Moyse.

Police believe that Moyse realized her boyfriend had set her up as his alibi and was unable to live with it.

Police proved that Sileo had killed Webb in order to receive the $650,000 (equivalent to $1,334,000 in 2025) life insurance money from their partnership policies, before Webb could end their partnership and shut down the General Wayne. Sileo was convicted in 2001 and sentenced to life in prison.

=== Famous people ===
Famous people who visited the inn include:

- Julius Erving
- Benjamin Franklin
- Dylan Gelula
- Marquis de Lafayette
- William Penn
- Edgar Allan Poe
- George Washington
- Anthony Wayne

== Synagogue ==
Chabad of the Main Line
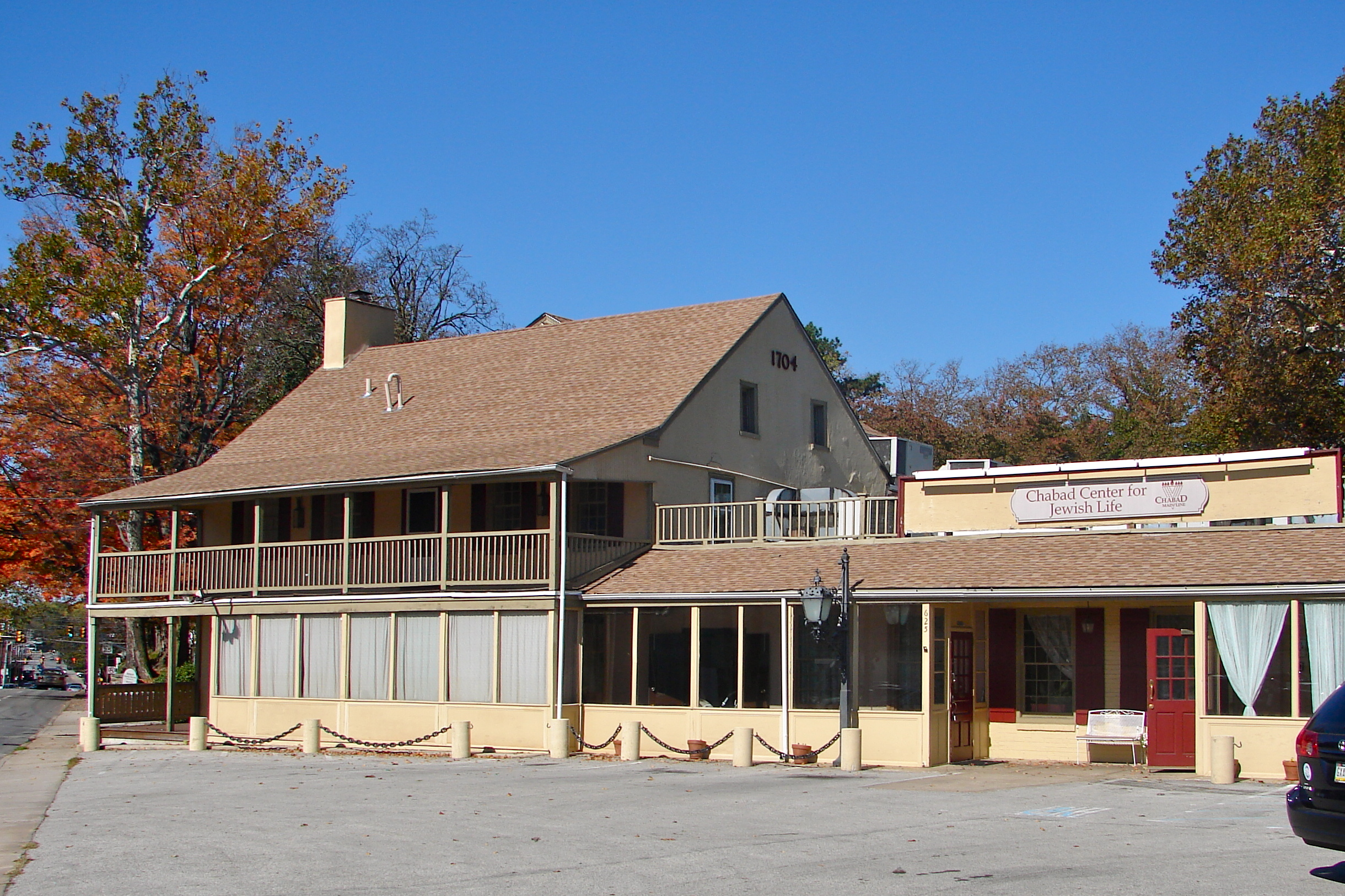

Religion
- Affiliation: Orthodox Judaism
- Rite: Chabad-Lubavitch
- Ecclesiastical or organizational status: Synagogue
- Leadership: Rabbi Shraga Sherman; Rabbi Baruch Shalom Davidson
- Status: Active

Location
- Location: 625 Montgomery Avenue, Merion Station, Pennsylvania 19066
- Country: United States
- Interactive map of Chabad of the Main Line

Architecture
- Completed: 2005

Website
- chabadmainline.org

In 2005, the building was purchased and renovated as Chabad of the Main Line, an Orthodox Jewish congregation that practices in the Chabad-Lubavitch rite. Located on the Philadelphia Main Line, the congregation converted the former tavern into a synagogue and community center.

== In popular culture ==
- The rumors that the Inn was haunted were explored on the TV series Unsolved Mysteries (season 1, episode 3, first broadcast 10/26/1988) in the segment "The Unexplained: The General Wayne Inn".
- The murder which occurred at the Inn was the subject of "Murder on the Menu", an episode of the TV series Forensic Files (season 10, episode 38, first broadcast 2/8/2006).
