= Jefferson Health Northeast =

Healthcare system in Northeast Philadelphia and Lower Bucks County

Coordinates: 40.0715°N 74.9832°W

- Formerly: Aria Health; Frankford Health Systems
- Type: Non-profit healthcare
- Industry: Healthcare services, hospitals
- Founded: 1902; 124 years ago
- Headquarters: Northeast Philadelphia and Lower Bucks County, U.S.
- Services: Primary, secondary, and tertiary care centers; ambulatory clinics
- Website: jeffersonhealth.org

Jefferson Health - Northeast, formerly known as Aria Health and Frankford Health Systems, is a healthcare system in Northeast Philadelphia and Lower Bucks County affiliated with Jefferson Health. It consists of three hospitals and several outpatient clinics that combine to 855 beds.

In July 2016, Aria and Jefferson Health System announced an official merger.

== Jefferson Frankford Hospital ==
The Frankford campus, now known as Jefferson Frankford Hospital, opened on July 4, 1903. The Frankford campus is a general medical and surgical hospital with 115 beds. In the last year with data available, the hospital had 131,188 emergency department visits, and performed 7,686 inpatient and 11,561 outpatient surgeries.

== Jefferson Torresdale Hospital ==
In 1977, the Torresdale campus, now known as Jefferson Torresdale Hospital, opened in northeast Philadelphia. It is a 258-bed hospital, and a Level II trauma center. The Torresdale campus has a 1,300 car parking garage. There are also partner urgent care clinics in the Torresdale area.

Work began in 2013 for a new emergency department and parking garage at the Torresdale campus, at a cost of $37 million. The expansion increased the size of the emergency department to 42 beds. Jefferson Torresdale Hospital in Philadelphia, Pa. is rated high performing in 2 adult procedures and conditions, according to U.S. News & World Report. It is a general medical and surgical facility. It scored high in patient safety, demonstrating commitment to reducing accidents and medical mistakes.

== Jefferson Bucks Hospital ==
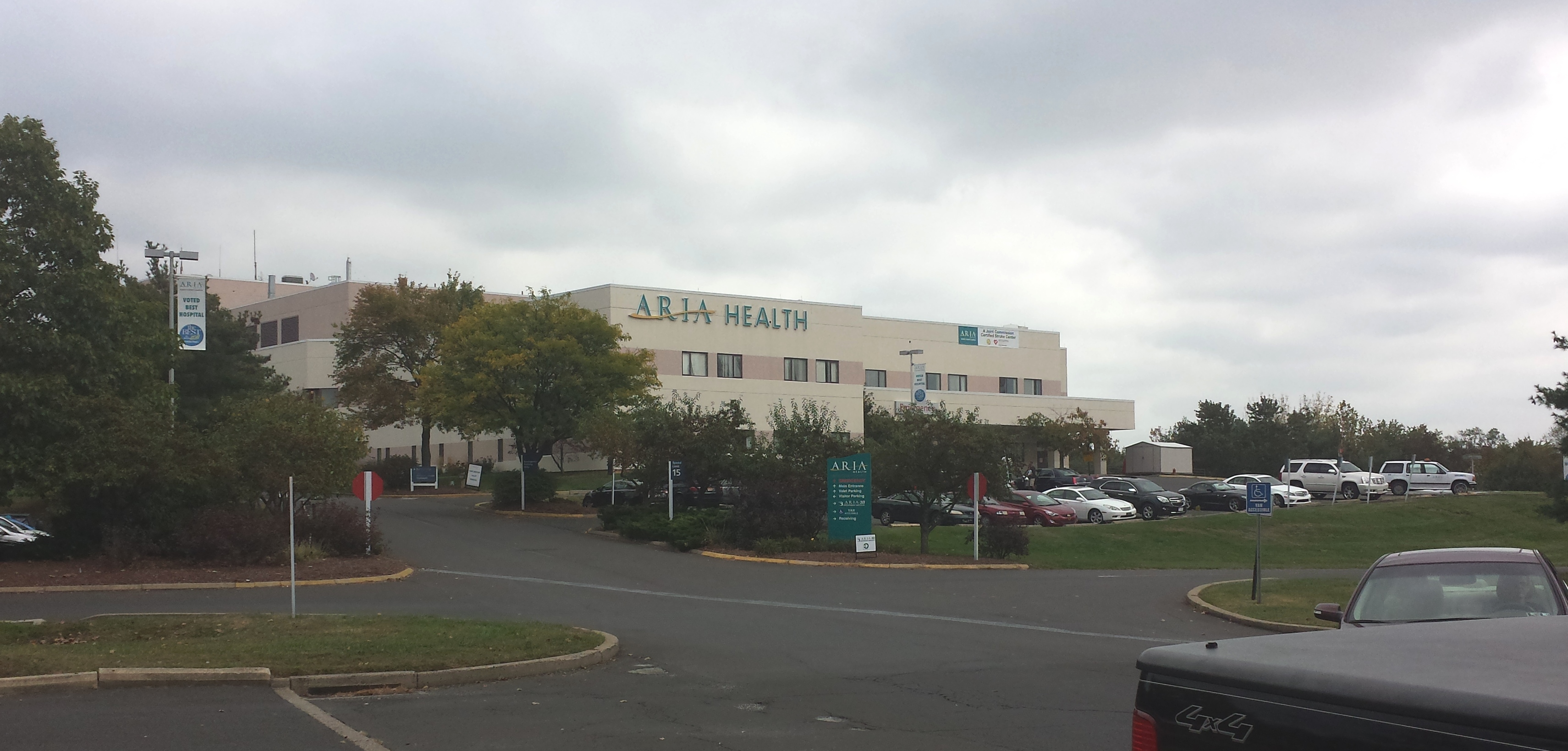
Jefferson Bucks Hospital, located in Langhorne, Pennsylvania

In 1999, the Aria Health system acquired Delaware Valley Medical Center, which is now called Jefferson Bucks Hospital. It is a 112-bed hospital located in Langhorne, Pennsylvania.

Aria Health sought to build a new 229-bed facility in Lower Makefield, Pennsylvania, to replace Bucks County Hospital. Local residents opposed this project, due to concerns about traffic congestion. In 2013, Aria Health proposed news plans for a "health care village," a facility offering multiple health care services, which may have lower impact on the environment and traffic congestion.

== Graduate medical education ==
Jefferson Health Northeast operates a number of osteopathic residency programs accredited by the American Osteopathic Association. Jefferson Health Northeast hosts residency programs in family medicine, internal medicine, emergency medicine, and podiatric surgery, including two combined residency programs: one in internal and emergency medicine and another in family and emergency medicine.

Jefferson Health Northeast also runs a critical care fellowship program.

== See also ==
- List of hospitals in Philadelphia, Pennsylvania
