= Jefferson Frankford Hospital =

- Jefferson Health

Geography
- Location: 4900 Frankford Ave, Philadelphia, Pennsylvania, United States
- Coordinates: 40°01′11″N 75°04′54″W

Organization
- Type: General hospital
- Affiliated university: New York Institute of Technology College of Osteopathic Medicine Rowan-Virtua School of Osteopathic Medicine Philadelphia College of Osteopathic Medicine

Services
- Emergency department: Level II trauma center
- Beds: 485

History
- Founded: July 4, 1903

Links
- Website: Jefferson Frankford Hospital
- Lists: Hospitals in Pennsylvania

Jefferson Frankford Hospital is a non-profit hospital located in Philadelphia and is a part of Jefferson Health, a multi-state non-profit health system. The hospital serves as a general hospital of Jefferson Health - Northeast. It is the oldest hospital in the Jefferson Health Northeast system. It is also a clinical affiliate of the New York Institute of Technology College of Osteopathic Medicine and the Rowan-Virtua School of Osteopathic Medicine and provides clinical clerkship education to the medical schools' osteopathic medical students.

The Frankford campus is a general medical and surgical hospital with 485 beds. In the last year with data available, the hospital had 131,188 emergency department visits, and performed 7,686 inpatient and 11,561 outpatient surgeries.

Jefferson Frankford Hospital was named one of 18 Philadelphia region hospitals that made Healthgrades' top 250 hospitals for 2019. In the same year Eddie Welsh, a nurse at Frankford, founded Project Cotton to "clothe discharged patients in need".

== History ==
Frankford Hospital was established in 1903 in the Frankford section of Northeast Philadelphia. Its founders, Dr. Joseph Ball and Dr. Charles P. Brady, began organizing the institution after discovering that patients in their area were routinely turned away from existing Philadelphia hospitals due to lack of available beds. A temporary medical dispensary operated in 1902 at 2360 Orthodox Street, treating more than 300 patients in its first six months. Following the repeal of a state law that had prohibited construction of new hospitals within Philadelphia city limits, the founders secured a charter in 1903 and opened the hospital at Penn and Sellers Streets. The original medical staff consisted of six physicians, and more than 3,000 patients were treated in the first ninety days. The Frankford Hospital School of Nursing was added in 1904.

In 1906, the hospital relocated to a larger and permanent campus at Frankford Avenue and Wakeling Street, establishing the long‑term home that would anchor its operations for the next century and beyond.

== Expansion ==
Frankford Hospital expanded its facilities over the decades:

- 1910: A maternity facility opened on Frankford Avenue.
- 1937: A new maternity building on Griscom Street replaced the earlier structure.
- 1950s: The Griscom Wing connected the maternity building to the main hospital.
- Early 1960s: The Korman Wing added modern operating rooms, an updated emergency department, and expanded laboratory space.
- 1988: Complete replacement of the Frankford Campus at the Frankford Avenue and Wakeling Street site.

=== Additional Campuses ===
Frankford Hospital grew into a regional health system through the creation and acquisition of additional campuses:

- 1970: The Torresdale Division opened with 230 beds in far Northeast Philadelphia, fully absorbing the hospital’s Maternity and Gynecology departments into its newer, larger facility.

- 1999: Acquisition of the Delaware Valley Medical Center in Bucks County, renamed Frankford Hospital–Bucks County.

=== Rebranding ===
In 2009, the organization adopted the name Aria Health to reflect its broader regional presence across Northeast Philadelphia and Lower Bucks County. By 2015, Aria Health had become the largest healthcare provider in those areas. In July 2016, Aria and Jefferson Health System announced an official merger.

=== Archival Records ===
Historical records of Frankford Hospital, dating from circa 1918 to the 1990s, are held by the Historical Society of Frankford. The collection includes photographs, correspondence, administrative documents, and annual reports documenting the hospital’s development and operations.
