= John Moss (Philadelphia) =

Jewish merchant, shipping magnate, and civic leader

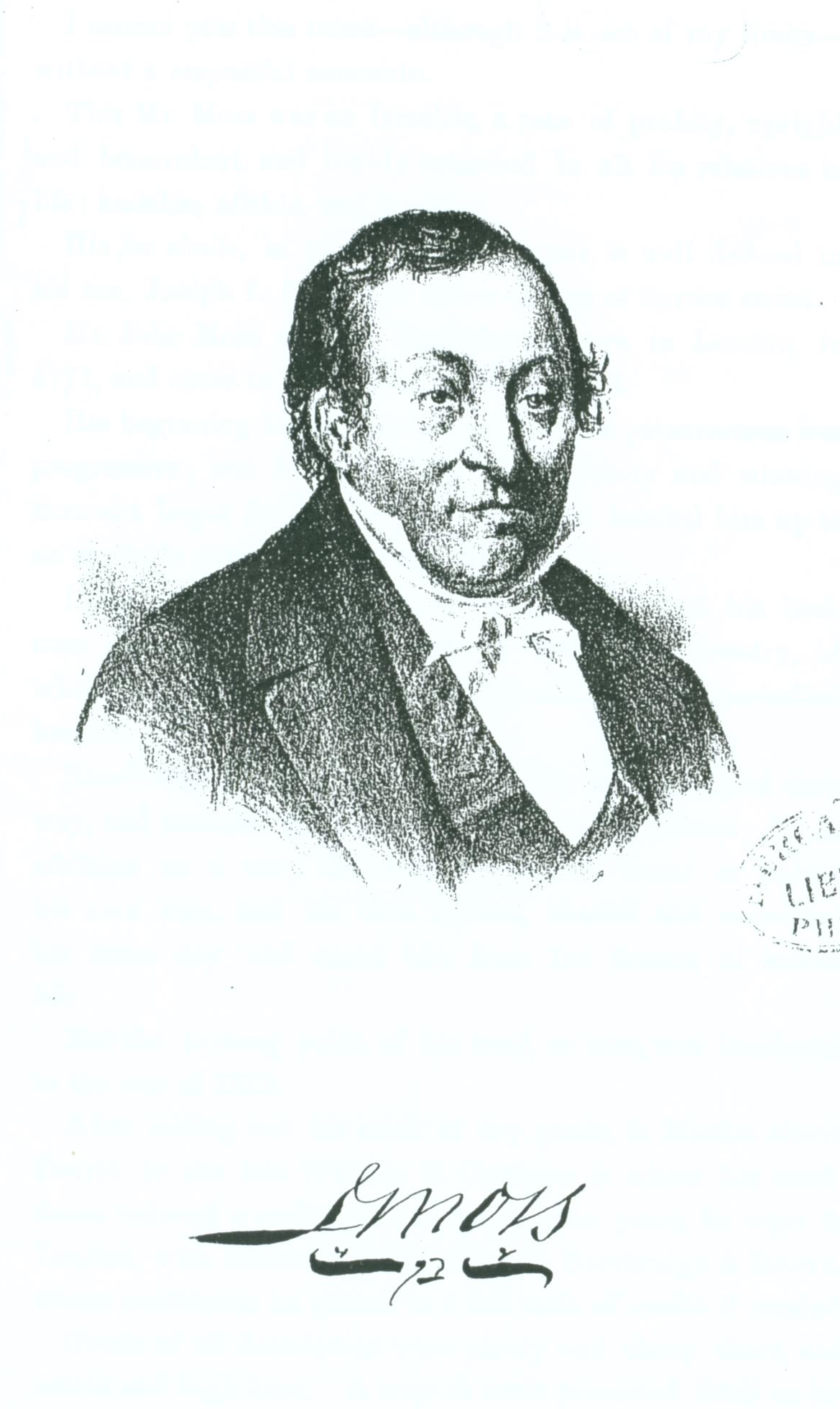
Portrait of John Moss taken from Philadelphia and Her Merchants

John Moss (1771 in London, England – 5 April 1847 in Philadelphia, Pennsylvania) was a Jewish merchant, shipping magnate, and civic leader. He emigrated to the United States as a glass engraver from London. Moss soon turned to other ventures after glass engraving proved insufficient to sustain a decent wage. He opened a dry goods store in 1807 and soon became a major importer, eventually owning a small merchant fleet. In 1823, he turned control of the business to his brothers and turned his attention to various civic enterprises. He was a founding member of the Musical Fund Society. He served as a steward of the Society of Sons of St. George a mutual-aid society for former Englishmen like himself and was a benefactor of the Philadelphia Orphan Asylum. In 1825, he acted as judge of engraved glass during the Franklin Institute's second exposition of American craftsmanship. .In 1828 he entered into politics by being elected to the Philadelphia City Council's lower house, the Common Council, on the Jacksonian Democratic Party ticket. It was in this capacity that he played a role in the establishment of the Wills Eye Hospital. Later in life he became a supporter of Isaac Leeser's American Jewish Publication Society. In 1840, in the wake of the Damascus Affair Moss led a protest committee from the city of Philadelphia.

== Personal life ==
In his personal life, John Moss was an active member of the synagogue Congregation Mikveh Israel, and contributed heavily to its building fund of 1818. He married Rebecca Lyons on February 15, 1797. He had nine children with her. John Moss died at age 76 on April 5, 1847, and was buried in Mikveh Israel Cemetery in Philadelphia.

== Lucien Moss ==
Of note amongst the descendants of John Moss is his grandson Lucien Moss. Lucien Moss was born in Philadelphia on May 25, 1831 and was educated in New Haven, Conn and in Philadelphia, PA. As a machinist for the Philadelphia-based firm of Morris & Tawes, he supervised the construction of sugar mills in Puerto Rico. In 1878, he founded the firm of Wiler & Moss, a brass working company. After this, he retired to Philadelphia, and much like his grandfather, engaged in charitable work. He was member of the boards of both the Society for the Prevention of Cruelty to Animals and the Society for the Prevention of Cruelty to Children. After his death on April 19, 1895, he left his fortune to the Jewish Hospital Association of Philadelphia to found the Lucien Moss Home for Incurables of the Jewish Faith, which would later be known as MossRehab in the modern day.
