= Rob Evans (Christian musician) =

American children's songwriter

Robert C. Evans
- Born: Paoli, Pennsylvania
- Occupation: Children's Christian Musician
- Spouse: Shelley Tait
- Children: 6

Robert C. "Rob" Evans is an American Catholic children's songwriter and performer best known for his performances as The Donut Man. He is known for his many sing-along audio and video tapes produced with Integrity Music. His DVDs have received six gold and two platinum sales awards from the RIAA. He is called the Donut Man in reference to one of his first songs that included the line "Life without Jesus is like a donut; there's a hole in the middle of your heart".

== Early life ==
Evans was born in Paoli, Pennsylvania to Presbyterian parents. At age 6 his parents divorced (which was later referenced in one of his videos, The Donut All-Stars). He graduated from high school in 1971. He met his future wife at age 19, when he was born again into a Pentecostal Bible church. Evans attended Rutgers University, but did not graduate, instead becoming a carpenter.

== The Donut Man ==
The "Donut Repair Club" started in 1981 with Evans as "The Donut Man". Evans used the donut's hole as a metaphor for something that was missing, a hole which Jesus could fill and repair. Over the following years, Evans and his Donut Repair Club would sell more than 6 million CDs and DVDs, and held appearances at more than 2,500 church concerts. Evans also sings in churches as a children's Bible story songsmith and presents concerts to children and families. His first-person songs put the audience into the shoes of the biblical characters he sings about. The Donut Man's sidekick is Duncan the Donut, a foam donut puppet built by professional puppet company Axtell Expressions, voiced by its creator Steve Axtell.

== Conversion to Catholicism ==
Evans, his wife, and one of their daughters were confirmed into the Catholic Church in Easter of 2006. Since then, Evans has completed a Catechetical Diploma from St. Charles Borromeo Seminary in Philadelphia. As a child of divorce, he equates that with the Reformation 'divorce' of Protestants from Catholics. Since his conversion, he has continued to produce and perform Christian music oriented toward families with small children.

== Personal life ==
Evans is married to Shelley Tait with 6 children, including an adopted daughter, Tonya, from Russia. His daughters Jen and Mary and his son Andy were on several of the Donut Repair Club videos. His son Jesse and daughter Sarah were in "Donut Hole 1" and "Donut Hole 2". Evans currently lives in Merion, Pennsylvania.

== Discography and videography ==
- Donut Hole 1 (1990)
- Donut Hole 2 (1990)
- On Tour (1991)
- The Celebration House (1992)
- The Best Present of All (1992)
- At the Zoo (1993)
- Barnyard Fun (1993)
- The Resurrection Celebration (1994)
- Video Sampler (1994)
- Camp Harmony (1994)
- The Donut All-Stars (1995)
- On the Air (1995)
- The Donut Repair Shop (1996)
- After School (1996)
- Duncan's Greatest Hits (1997)
- Active Time Songs (1997)
- Quiet Time Songs (1997)
- Paul in a Basket (1998)
- Bible Songs, Volume 1 (1999)
- Bible Songs, Volume 2 (1999)
