= Keystone First =

- Type: Medicaid; Medicare
- Industry: Healthcare
- Founded: 1982
- Headquarters: Pennsylvania
- Website: www.keystonefirstpa.com

Keystone First is a medical assistance (Medicaid and Medicare) managed care health plan based in southeastern Pennsylvania. Keystone focuses on low-income residents in southeastern Pennsylvania counties including, Bucks, Chester, Delaware, Montgomery, and Philadelphia. The healthcare provider currently serves over 400,000 residents in the area.

== History ==
Keystone First was founded by the Sisters of Mercy in 1982 as the Mercy Health Plan. The company is a subsidiary of Independence Blue Cross. In 2015, Keystone First was rated among the "top Medicaid plans in Pennsylvania". Keystone First allows clients to receive regular eye exams, however does not cover prescription eyeglasses or contact lenses if the client is over the age of 21. Some Keystone plans do not cover "anesthesia without prior authorization" for dental care.

Keystone First VIP Choice plan serve dual eligible special needs which is offered to clients on both Medicare and Medicaid. Keystone First Community HealthChoices currently covers approximately 70,000 people in the region.

== See also ==
- Health Partners Plans
