= Merion Botanical Park =

Park in Pennsylvania, United States

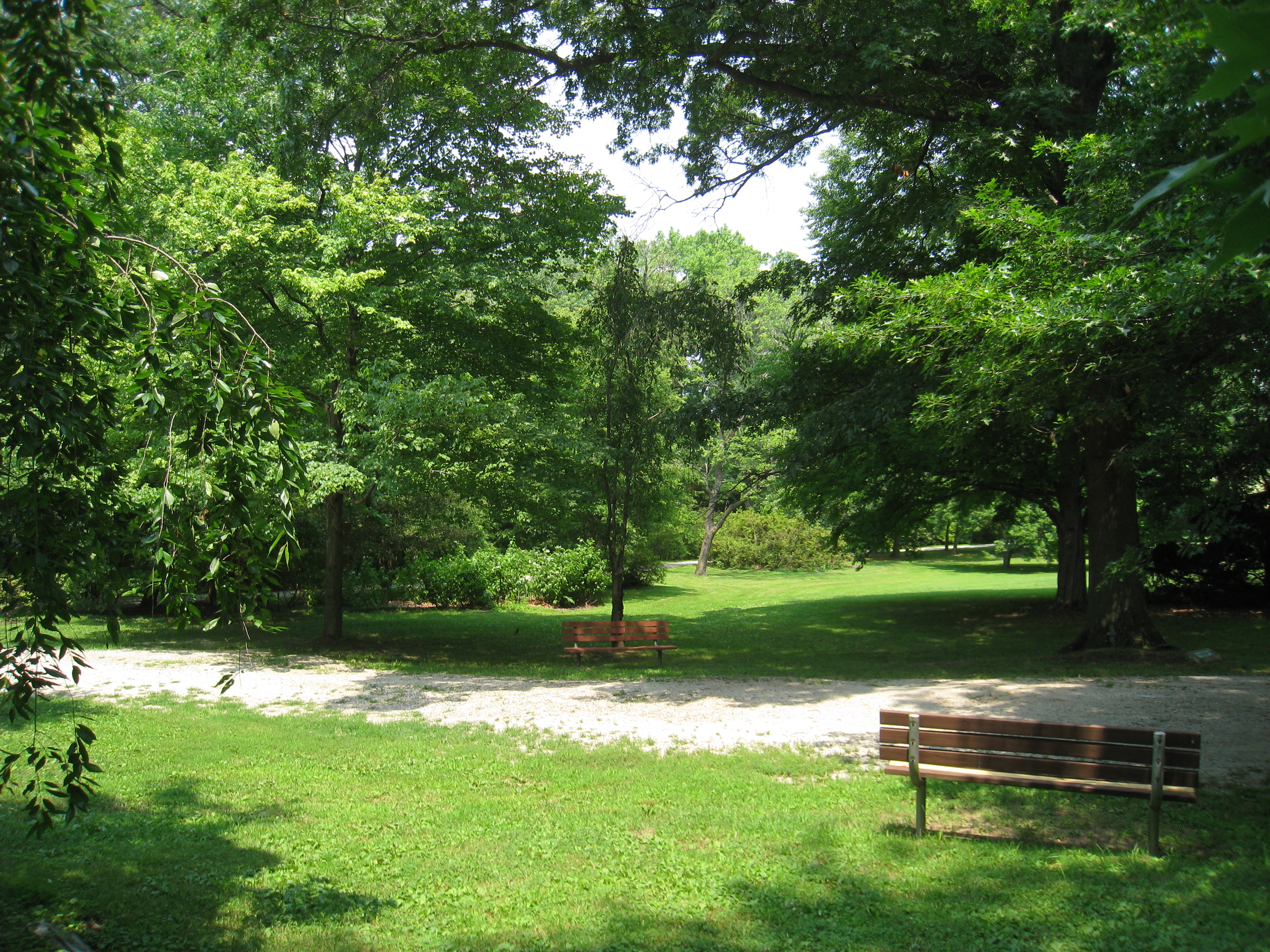
- Merion Botanical Park

- Location within Pennsylvania
- Type: Municipal park Botanical garden
- Location: Merion, Pennsylvania
- Coordinates: 39.9949°N 75.2508°W
- Area: 13.5 acres (5.5 hectares)
- Created: 1944
- Operator: Botanical Society of Lower Merion
- Open: Daily

The Merion Botanical Park (13.5 acres) is a city park and botanical garden located at 100 Merion Road, Merion, Pennsylvania, United States. It is open daily without charge.

== History and notable features ==
The park was created in 1944 by residents who formed the Botanical Society of Lower Merion, which continues to manage the Park. Among the founders was Laura Barnes, wife of art collector Albert C. Barnes. A renewal began in 2012 with "Botanical Bill" Earley and an "unlikely army of Montgomery County inmates, rabbinic students, truants, Boy Scouts, ROTC members, and Little Leaguers" clearing the park of 1,000 pounds of trash.

It lies adjacent to the railway tracks, and now contains azaleas, dogwoods, magnolias, cut-leaf maples, redbuds, rhododendron and viburnum.

== See also ==
- List of botanical gardens in the United States
