= Mount Sinai Hospital (Philadelphia, Pennsylvania) =

Coordinates: 39°55′49.1442″N 75°9′8.9748″W

Geography
- Location: 1429 South 5th Street, Philadelphia, Pennsylvania, United States

History
- Founded: 1905
- Closed: 1997
- Demolished: 2016

Links
- Lists: Hospitals in Pennsylvania

Mount Sinai Hospital was a hospital in Philadelphia in the United States, from 1905 to 1997.

During the later part of the 19th Century, the South Philadelphia neighborhood that is now called Pennsport was quickly growing, due to influx of impoverished immigrants. Between 1873 and 1915, was the final entry point for an estimated 1 million European immigrants searching for promising futures, was Philadelphia's first immigrant station at Pier 53, the Washington Avenue Immigration Station, located just north of the Pennsport neighborhood. Philadelphia was America's second-largest city, a thriving industrial center, and a vital force in the American economy. The city also remained major transportation hub and gateway to America and Pennsylvania's industrial empire. Though only a fraction-no more than 5 percent-of the people who immigrated to the United States during those years, the newcomers who entered through Philadelphia represented every ethnic and religious group that comprised America's so-called "New Immigrants" who arrived between the 1880s and the outbreak of the First World War. In 1882 there was the great migration from Russia of Jewish migrants to Philadelphia that settled in the Pennsport neighborhood during this time period and many suffered from a severe lack of medical services. Numerous organizations failed in instituting a medical facility to aid these immigrants in the neighborhood. Ultimately, at the turn of the Twentieth Century, the Beth Israel Hospital Association was established in order to solve the problem. This establishment successfully treated the area's poor Jewish population and also accepted patients from other faiths. Beth Israel was absorbed by the Franklin Free Dispensary only a few months after beginning their operation. At around the same time, Jewish physicians opened their Mount Sinai Dispensary in Society Hill, however because of their common goal, both dispensaries, Franklin Free and Mount Sinai, agreed to merge and renamed themselves the Mount Sinai Hospital Association.

Philadelphia city laws stated that hospitals treating consumptives (now known as Tuberculosis) or immigrants, could not be built near homes and churches. The Mount Sinai Hospital Association considered building the facility outside of the city however they knew that it had to be built near where patients lived. By 1904, the law was amended after lobbying the city government and the association procured an old lumber yard on the 1400 block of South 5th Street, central to the Pennsport neighborhood, that was the most in need. The $25,000 purchase included the yard's four-story building (built in 1893), which would become the first Mount Sinai Hospital. In March 1905, Mount Sinai Hospital officially opened to the public and accepted its first patients.

In 1952, Mount Sinai Hospital merged with Northern Liberties Hospital and the Jewish Hospital to form a single medical center, now the Jefferson Einstein Hospital.

The hospital closed in 1997 and was demolished in 2016.
