= Bryn Mawr Hospital =

Coordinates: 40.019°N 75.321°W

- Main Line Health
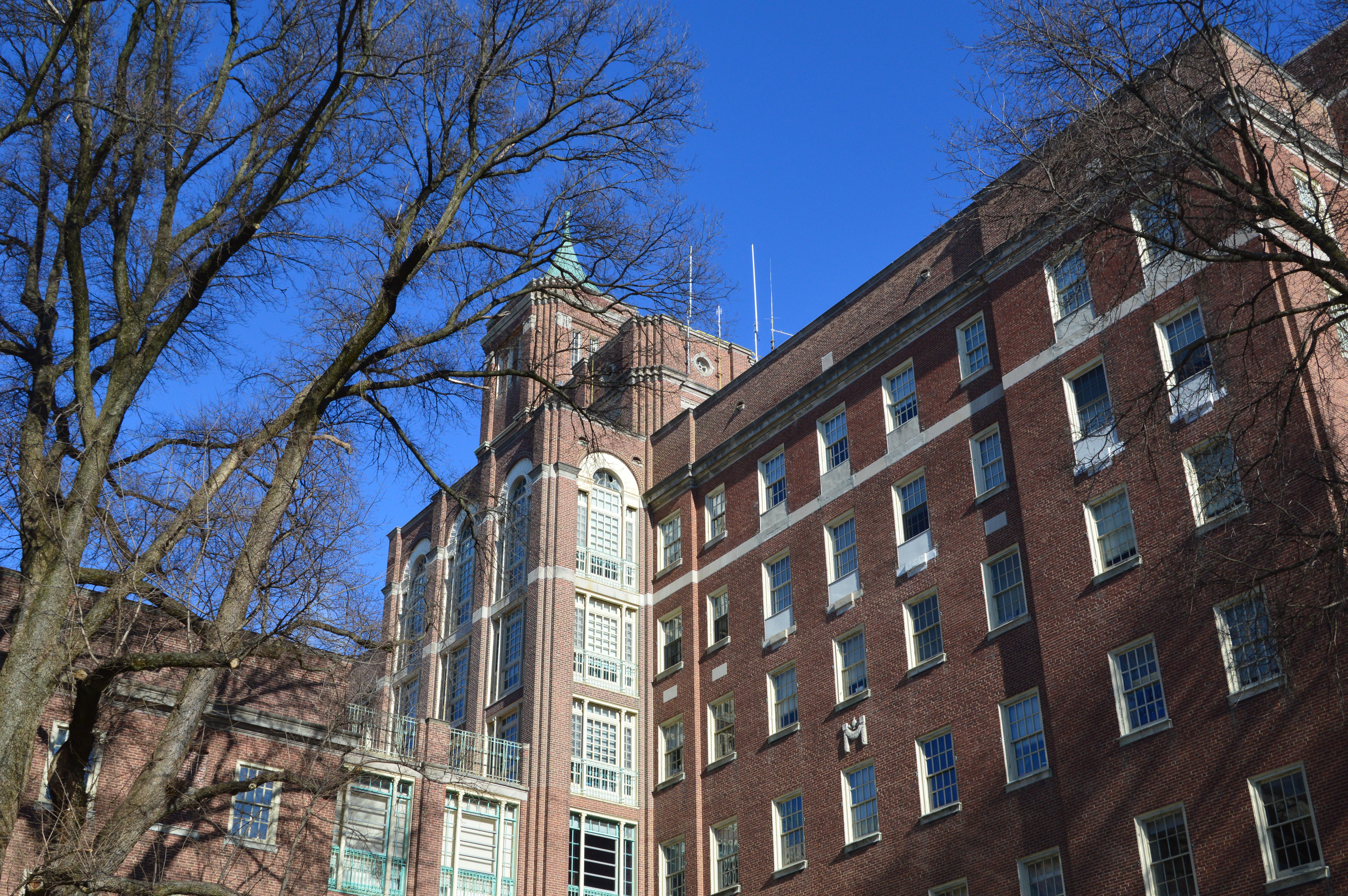

Geography
- Location: Bryn Mawr, Pennsylvania, United States

Organization
- Type: Specialized
- Network: Main Line Health

Services
- Standards: Joint Commission
- Emergency department: Yes
- Beds: 264

History
- Founded: 1893

Links
- Website: www.mainlinehealth.org/locations/bryn-mawr-hospital
- Lists: Hospitals in Pennsylvania

Bryn Mawr Hospital, part of Main Line Health, is a 264-bed acute care hospital located in Bryn Mawr, Pennsylvania. Founded in 1893, Bryn Mawr Hospital has been named among U.S. News & World Report’s Best Hospitals in the Philadelphia region. Bryn Mawr Hospital also received the Joint Commission's Gold Seal of Approval for quality.

Bryn Mawr Hospital and its outpatient site at Newtown Square offer a full range of services and programs including a cancer program, orthopaedics, cardiovascular care, behavioral health, pediatrics, bariatric surgery and weight wellness, neurointervention, gender care program, plastic and reconstructive surgery, general surgery, breast cancer program, and obstetrics and maternity, including a level III neonatal intensive care unit (NICU).

In 2019, Main Line Health opened a 250,000-square-foot Pavilion that is home to new private patient rooms, a new intensive care unit, two medical/surgical telemetry units, 12 operating rooms, a 25-bed maternity unit, a labor and delivery unit, and the neonatal intensive care unit.

== Fiscal Year 2022 Statistics ==
- Full-time employees: 1,362
- Total discharges: 13,485
- Licensed beds: 264
- Births: 1,730
- Bassinets: 26
- Outpatient visits: 209,329
- ER visits: 38,079
- Total surgeries: 8,998

== About Main Line Health ==
Main Line Health, a community-based not-for-profit health system, that includes Bryn Mawr Hospital, Lankenau Medical Center, Riddle Hospital, Paoli Hospital, Bryn Mawr Rehabilitation Hospital, Mirmont Treatment Center, and Lankenau Institute for Medical Research.
