= Main Line Reform Temple-Beth Elohim =

Reform synagogue in Pennsylvania

Main Line Reform-Beth Elohim
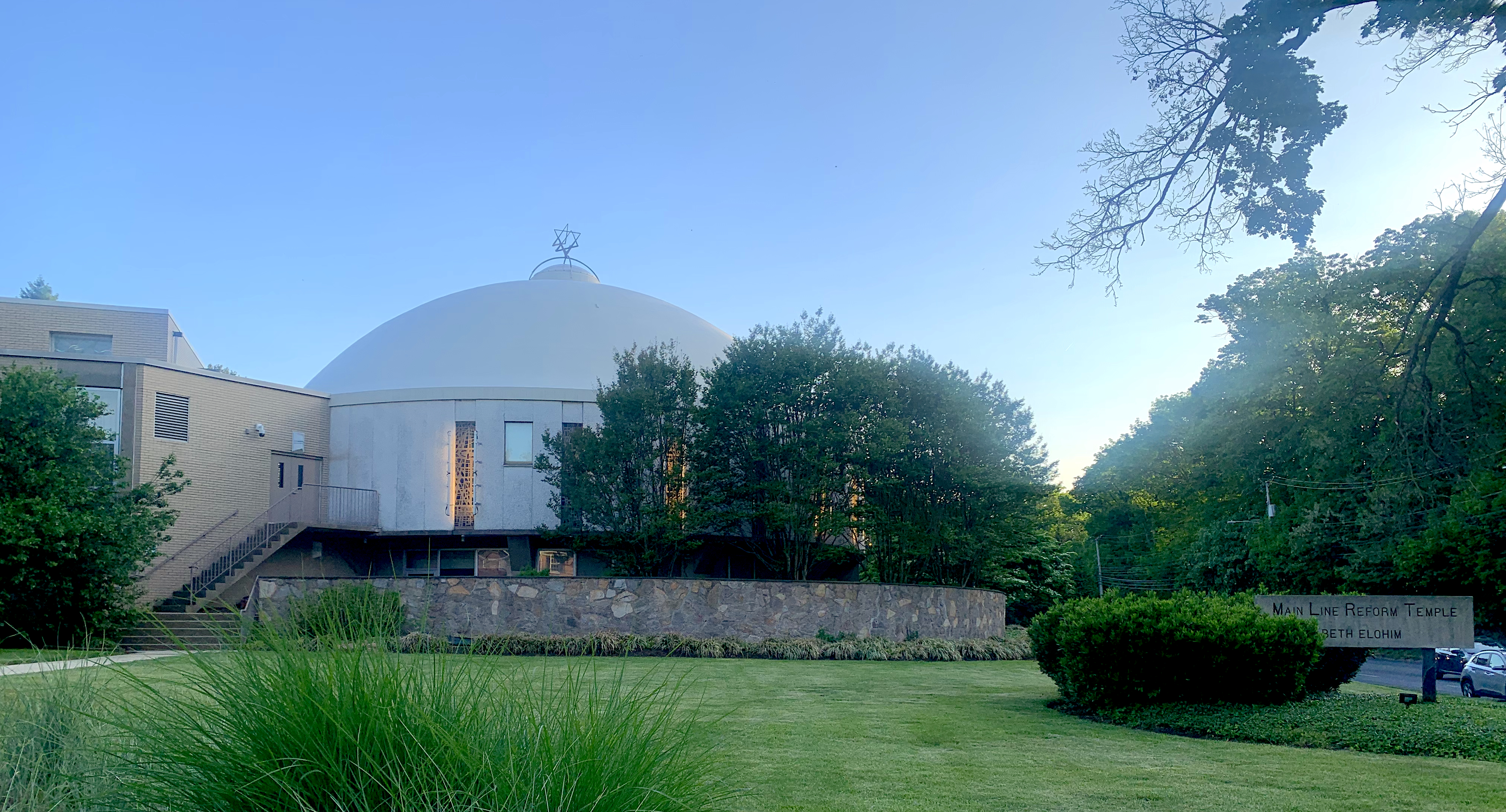
- Main Line Reform Temple-Beth Elohim (May 2026)
- Formation: 1952
- Headquarters: 410 Montgomery Ave, Wynnewood, Pennsylvania 19096
- Coordinates: 40.0123°N 75.2730°W
- Members: 950 (2024)
- Senior Rabbi: Rabbi Geri Newburge
- Cantor: Cantor Faryn Rudnick
- Associate Rabbi: Rabbi Eric Mollo
- Associate Rabbi, Director of Education: Rabbi Kevin Kleinman
- Publication: MLRT Matters
- Affiliations: Union for Reform Judaism
- Website: mlrt.org

Main Line Reform Temple-Beth Elohim is a Reform synagogue located in Wynnewood, Pennsylvania, United States. The Temple was founded in 1952 as the second synagogue in Lower Merion. Main Line Reform today is an active synagogue offering religious services, a preschool, Hebrew school, adult education, social programming, community engagement, and a summer day camp.

== Founding, building, and Rabbi Gordon (1952–1972) ==
Main Line Reform Temple was organized in 1952 with the sponsorship of the Council of Reform Synagogues of Greater Philadelphia. At the time it was numbered the ninth Reform congregation in the Philadelphia area. Main Line's founders announced in July 1952 that it would hold its first high holiday services that fall in the auditorium of the Women's Club of Ardmore at 106 Ardmore Avenue; Rabbi Samuel M. Silver was retained from Cleveland to lead the services. The congregation held its religious school classes in the Ardmore YMCA until November 1952 when they outgrew the YMCA and were offered use of the Haverford Religious Society of Friends school and meeting space on Buck Lane, south of Lancaster Avenue.

In April 1953, Main Line Reform elected Natalie Hodes as president, the only woman at the time to be president of a synagogue in the country. Hodes had served as the congregation's first chairperson, and then as its acting president during its first year in 1952. She was responsible for persuading Rabbi Silver to lead services, hired the Temple's first cantor, arranged for guest rabbis until a permanent rabbi would be hired, and found what would become the congregation's long time home at 410 Montgomery Avenue in Wynnewood. She would remain a lifelong member until her death in July 1982.

Main Line Reform announced the hire of Rabbi Theodore H. Gordon in May 1953 who would begin with the congregation on September 1, 1953. Rabbi Gordon had been director of the Hillel Foundation at the University of Pennsylvania, and had previously held a pulpit with the Baltimore Hebrew Congregation following his ordination from Hebrew Union College. Rabbi Gordon conducted High Holiday services for Main Line in September 1953 which were held in the auditorium of the Ellis Country School in Newtown Square, Pennsylvania. On January 17, 1954, Rabbi Gordon was formally installed by the congregation at a ceremony at the Women's Club of Ardmore while the congregation continued to hold services and religious school at Haverford Friends School. Between his hiring and official installation, membership grew from 55 to 260 families.

Temple Adath Israel of the Main Line, a Conservative synagogue, had been chartered in 1946. Adath Israel first rented space in the Ardmore YMCA building, the Ardmore Women's Club building, and in rooms on the campuses of Haverford College and Bryn Mawr College. Seeking its own building, Adath Israel purchased the former Montgomery County Day School property and mansion at Montgomery Avenue and North Wynnewood Road in 1949 and renovated the former school building for its use for services. When Adath Israel moved from 410 Montgomery Avenue to Merion in 1954, Main Line Reform purchased the property from Adath Israel and used the former mansion for its own services.

As the Jewish population grew in Lower Merion in the 1950s, Main Line Reform elected to raze the mansion and build its own synagogue campus. On December 27, 1958, led by board president Julius Haber, Main Line broke ground on its new building to be constructed at the Montgomery Avenue property. The new building was dedicated on September 11, 1960, and included a sanctuary seating 400, an auditorium, classrooms, offices, chapel, lounge, kitchen, and gift shop. At the time, the congregation numbered 500 member families. The dedication ceremonies were presided over by Rabbi Gordon; Rabbi Solomon Kaplan, director of the Federation of Reform Congregations of Greater Philadelphia; Ralph W. Pries, Main Line's board president; and Rev. John Albert, rector of Wynnewood's All Saints Episcopal Church. While Main Line Reform constructed its sanctuary and classroom buildings on Montgomery Avenue in 1960, Adath Israel welcomed Main Line Reform which shared Adath Israel's Merion building where it held its own services, community events, and Hebrew school.

Ehrlich & Levinson, Philadelphia, were engaged as architects for the new Main Line Reform Temple building; Harry Antell was the structural engineer; and the Fleming Co. of Wynnewood hired as general contractors. The sanctuary was built with a twenty-foot high dome seventy-feet in diameter. Domes were prone to dampen sound which was solved by the construction of a concave honeycomb of 13,000 concrete pipe sections four-inches in diameter and eight-inches long. The pipes would absorb sound energy and provide thermal insulation. The building would be highlighted in engineering trade journal for the post-stressed lightweight concrete dome, and the project noted for its completion within its proposed budget and timeline. The sanctuary's stained glass was designed and executed by French artist Gabriel Loire.

Construction on the new building continued through 1960 and early 1961. The full dedication of the new campus took place the weekend of June 9–11, 1961. Rabbi Maurice Eisendrath, president of the Union of American Hebrew Congregations addressed the congregation on Friday night, June 9, 1961, and Judge Horace Stern, former Chief Justice of the Pennsylvania Supreme Court spoke at the ceremonies the afternoon of June 11, 1961. Main Line Reform numbered 500 members at the time of the dedication.

During this period, the congregation's Men's Club held an annual fundraising dinner at which it would present and honor a different sports star. In January 1957, the Men's Club presented Philadelphia Warriors owner and future-Basketball Hall of Famer Eddie Gottlieb with an award of lifetime achievement prior to a Warriors' game against the St. Louis Hawks during the team's Old Timers Night celebration. In January 1958, the Men's Club presented its sportsmanship award to former boxing champion and U.S. marine Barney Ross. On January 31, 1961, the Men's Club welcomed Phillies All-Star Robin Roberts along with sports broadcaster and Philadelphia-native Jack Whitaker and the Baltimore Colts All-Pro Gino Marchetti.

Cantor Samuel Kligfeld was hired by Main Line Reform in 1963.

== Community engagement and Rabbi Hausen (1972–1996) ==
In November 1969, Main Line Reform hosted Philadelphia Civil Rights activist Muhammad Kenyatta who was national vice-president of the Black Economic Development Conference and President of the Greater Philadelphia branch which worked to end poverty in communities of color. The BEDC was demanding $500 million in Black reparations, and Main Line opened its doors to Kenyatta to hear him speak and take questions which attracted 225 attendees. Rabbi Harold Novoseller, representing Philadelphia's Jewish Community Relations Council, and the far-right Jewish Defense League objected to the BEDC's demands, and picketed the event. Following Main Line's engagement with Kenyatta, Rabbi Novoseller and the JDL threatened action against any Jewish organization that provided Kenyatta with a forum. In response to the threat of the JDL and JCRC, area rabbis would approach Philadelphia District Attorney Arlen Specter who warned the JDL and JCRC against any "vigilante" actions.

Rabbi Gordon retired in 1972 and was named Rabbi Emeritus of Main Line Reform. He remained active in the community, helping to start Martin's Run residential life-care community in Marple Township, at the time the only Jewish life-care community in the country, and serving as Martin Run's president and clergy. Rabbi Gordon was succeeded by Rabbi Max Hausen who would lead the congregation for twenty-five years before retiring in 1996.

When the Yom Kippur War broke out on October 6, 1973, the American Jewish community rallied to the defense of the State of Israel through prayer, political advocacy, and financial support. Pennsylvania Governor Milton Shapp was a resident of Merion and long-time member of Main Line. On October 8, 1973, the Temple held a special service attended by 450 at which Governor Shapp spoke in support of Israel. He had been successful in business prior to his gubernatorial run and personally purchased US$25,000 (equivalent to $181,316 in 2025) in Israeli bonds in support of the Temple's fundraising.

The Solomon Schechter Day School was located in Main Line Reform's school building from 1970 until the school's move to Haverford and City Line Avenue in 1977.

Main Line Reform celebrated its twenty-fifth anniversary with a family picnic and games on May 22, 1977, at Haverford College. The congregation would grow to 1,050 member families by 1980.

Rabbi Richard L. Klein was named associate rabbi at Main Line Reform in November 1984. The congregation counted 1,200 member families in 1986.

Throughout its history, the congregation has been engaged in wider social engagement and Rabbi Hausen championed this work during his tenure.

Rabbi Hausen maintained a friendship with Zion Baptist Church's Rev. James Pollard. In January 1991, Zion Baptist Church and its choir joined Main Line Reform at the synagogue for prayer, fellowship, and singing in observance of Martin Luther King Jr.'s birthday, and Main Line Reform returned the honor by visiting the church the following Sunday. In January 1998, Main Line Reform welcomed Zion Baptist Church along with Wynnewood's St. Paul Lutheran Church, and Penn Valley's Beth Am Congregation synagogue along with the congregations' choirs and clergy for a Shabbat service honoring Dr. King. These collaborative observances continued in January 2000.

The 1992 U.S. Senate election in Pennsylvania between Sen. Arlen Specter and Lynn Yeakel evoked strong debate around Bryn Mawr Presbyterian Church and its pastor, Rev. Eugene C. Bay's criticism of the State of Israel's policy on Palestinians. Yeakel was a member of Bryn Mawr Presbyterian and the church's politics became a focal point of the election. Sen. Specter won reelection but community mistrust and acrimony lingered into the following year. In March 1993, Main Line Reform welcomed Rev. Bay for a community discussion, and to repair the inter-congregation relationships.

== Rabbi Straus, Rabbi Newburge, and Main Line today (1996–present) ==
Following Rabbi Hausen's retirement, Rabbi Paul Citrin was named senior rabbi in 1996. A self-described "activist rabbi", Rabbi Citrin proved not to be a match with the congregation and his tenure was short lived. He is credited by Main Line Reform with having established new Adult Education programs that expanded lifelong learning opportunities in the community.

Rabbi David Straus was hired as Senior Rabbi at Main Line Reform in 1998. Rabbi Strauss continued the congregation's legacy of interfaith fellowship and social advocacy. He was active with the Religious Leaders Council of Greater Philadelphia, rallying among many causes with other faith leaders against gun violence in the city. Rabbi Straus was active with the National Council of Synagogues and the Religious Action Center of Reform Judaism. Membership would fall to 600 families during Rabbi Strauss' tenure before climbing to 850 at his retirement in 2022.

In April 1999, Main Line Reform held a dinner to honor and celebrate Rabbi Ted Gordon for his ninetieth birthday. Rabbi Gordon would pass away in February 2005.

A large expansion and renovation project was completed at Main Line Reform in 2006 at a cost of $10 million under Rabbi Straus' leadership. The renovation included making the sanctuary and building wheelchair accessible in ways it had not been previously.

Marshall Portnoy was serving as cantor in 2011.

Rabbi Geri Newburge came to Main Line Reform in 2013 as an associate rabbi, and was retained on a permanent basis in 2015. When Rabbi Strauss retired in 2022, Rabbi Newburge succeeded him as Senior Rabbi, a role in which she continues to the present day. Rabbi Straus is currently Rabbi Emeritus and remains active in the Philadelphia community and involved in national issues of Jewish relations and interfaith community building.

Main Line Reform regularly welcomes Jewish thought leaders and media personalities to speak at the congregation. David Axelrod was a featured speaker in November 2018. NPR's Terry Gross spoke at the synagogue in February 2020. In October 2021, Main Line Reform joined with Bryan Mawr Presbyterian Church to welcome Yossi Klein Halevi to speak on his book, Letters to my Palestinian neighbor.

In July 2022, Main Line Reform Temple had 850 member families, 155 students in its Early Childhood Education center, and the kindergarten to twelfth-grade religious school had 300 students. Rabbi Eric Mollo was hired as associate rabbi in 2024; Rabbi Mollo's parents had been Main Line Reform members prior to his birth. At the time of Rabbi Mollo's hire, Main Line Reform membership had grown to 950 member families. The Early Childhood Education center added an infant program in 2024. In September 2026, the synagogue inaugurated a new playground for the Education center funded by contributions from Education center families and congregation members.
