= Lankenau Medical Center =

- Main Line Health
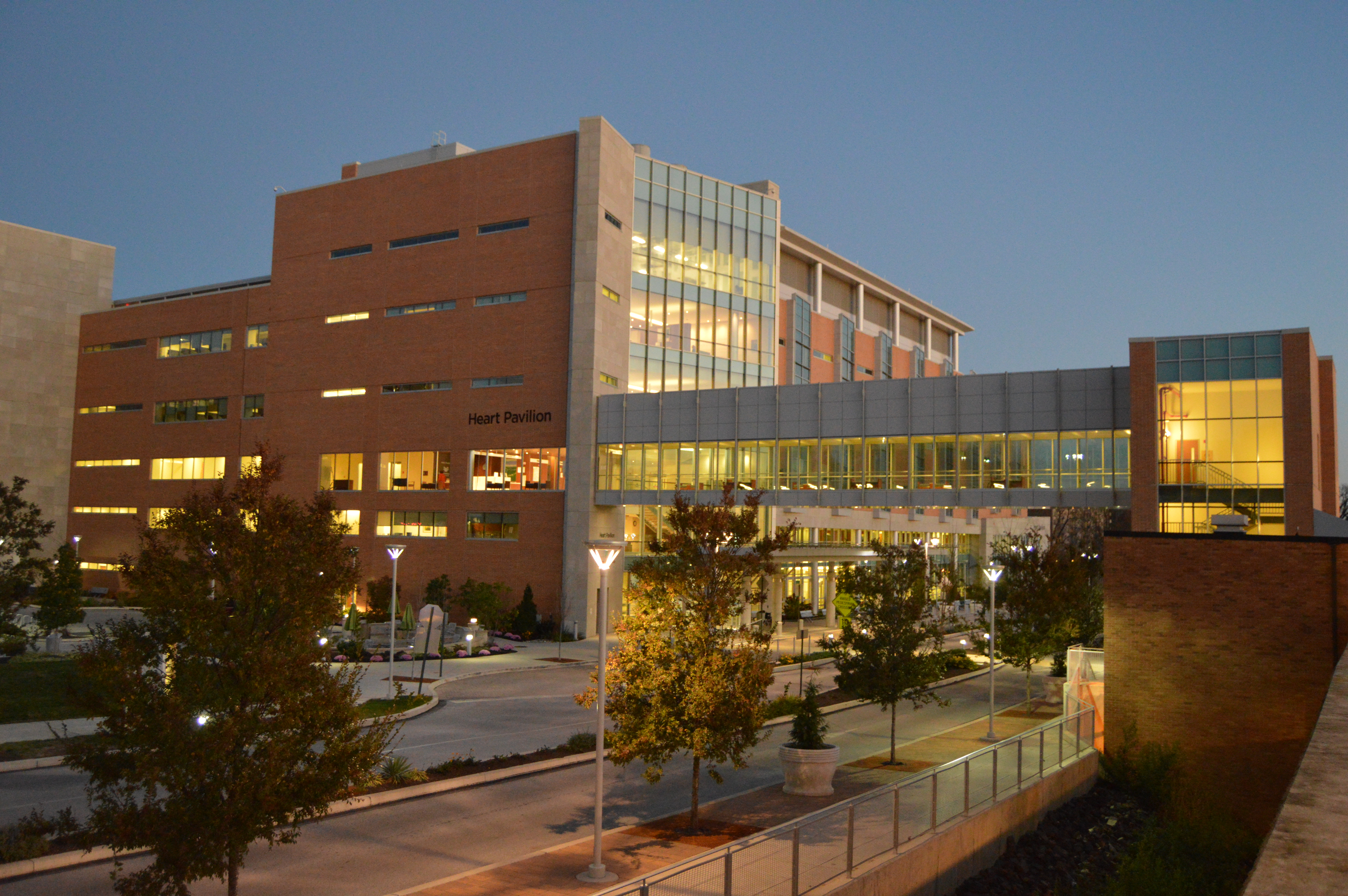

Geography
- Location: 100 E Lancaster Ave, Penn Wynne, Pennsylvania, United States
- Coordinates: 39.988°N 75.262°W

Organization
- Type: Teaching

Services
- Standards: Joint Commission
- Emergency department: Level II Trauma Center
- Beds: 370

Helipads
- Helipad: FAA LID: 9PA9

History
- Founded: 1850

Links
- Website: mainlinehealth.org/lankenau
- Lists: Hospitals in Pennsylvania

Lankenau Medical Center, part of Main Line Health, is a 370-bed acute care, teaching hospital in Penn Wynne, Pennsylvania.

Lankenau Medical Center's clinical areas include the Lankenau Heart Institute, the gastrointestinal and GI endoscopy program, cancer care services, pulmonology, orthopaedics, obstetrics and maternity, including and a level III neonatal intensive care unit, as well as minimally invasive and robotic surgery. The campus is also home to the Lankenau Institute for Medical Research and the Annenberg Center for Medical Education.

== History ==
Initially chartered in 1860 as the German Hospital of Philadelphia, the facility opened in 1866 on Morris Street in North Philadelphia. With the entry of the United States into World War I in 1917, many German institutions took new names. The German Hospital renamed itself Lankenau Hospital after John D. Lankenau, a German-born Philadelphia businessman who had been one of the hospital's first leaders.

The hospital moved to larger facilities at Girard and Corinthian Avenues in North Philadelphia in 1884. In December 1953, Lankenau moved to Wynnewood on the Main Line, occupying the site of the former Overbrook Country Club.

In October 1984, the hospital joined with Bryn Mawr Hospital and the Bryn Mawr Rehabilitation Hospital under a nonprofit umbrella organization, Main Line Health.

In 2010, Main Line began renovating the hospital, adding a 96-bed Heart Pavilion, dedicated to cardiovascular care, a parking garage, and a central utility plant. The expanded facilities were renamed Lankenau Medical Center.

== Notable births, hospitalizations, and deaths ==
=== Births ===
- Kobe Bryant, NBA basketball player, August 23, 1978
- Joan Jett, rock musician, September 22, 1958
- Jacqueline Susann, novelist, August 20, 1918
- Bryce Young, professional football player, July 25, 2001
- Madeleine Ezell, founder of Academia Redwood

=== Deaths ===
- Bootsie Barnes, jazz musician, April 22, 2020
- J. Pius Barbour, Baptist minister, January 5, 1974
- Tom Brookshier, professional football player, Philadelphia Eagles, January 29, 2010
- Leonard G. Carr, Baptist minister, June 17, 1976
- Joseph J. Hersch, Pennsylvania State Representative, October 17, 1968
- Hub, bassist and musician, December 16, 2021
- Howard Lassoff, American-Israeli basketball player, February 7, 2013
- Jack Ogden, professional baseball player, Cincinnati Reds, November 9, 1977
- David Smyrl, actor, March 22, 2016
- Sally Young, professional bridge player, February 27, 1970
- Flora M. Vare, Pennsylvania State Senator, May 27, 1962

== Statistics ==
As of 2022, the medical center has:

- Full-time Employees: 2,007
- Total discharges: 18,475
- Licensed beds: 370
- Births: 2,888
- Bassinets: 34
- Total surgeries: 12,723
- ER visits: 54,175
