= Jefferson Torresdale Hospital =

- Jefferson Health

Geography
- Location: 10800 Knights Road, Philadelphia, Pennsylvania, U.S.
- Coordinates: 40°04′16″N 74°58′58″W

Organisation
- Type: General hospital
- Affiliated university: Philadelphia College of Osteopathic Medicine

Services
- Emergency department: II
- Beds: 258

Helipads
- Helipad: FAA LID: 1PS6
Number	Length		Surface
Number	ft	m	Surface
H1	65	20	Asphalt

History
- Founded: 1977

Links
- Website: Jefferson Torresdale Hospital

Jefferson Torresdale Hospital is a non-profit hospital in northeast Philadelphia and a part of Jefferson Health. The hospital serves as a general hospital, a Level II trauma center and has a helipad for transport.

The hospital uses minimally invasive surgeries and focuses on cancer, cardiology, gynaecology, gastroenterology, dentistry, and urology.

== History ==
Jefferson Torresdale Hospital opened in northeast Philadelphia in 1977. It is a 258-bed hospital, and a Level II trauma center. The Torresdale campus has a 1,300 car parking garage. There are also partner urgent care clinics in the Torresdale area.

Work began in 2013 for a new emergency department and parking garage at the Torresdale campus, at a cost of $37 million. The expansion increased the size of the emergency department to 42 beds. Jefferson Torresdale Hospital is rated highly performing in 2 adult procedures and conditions, according to U.S. News & World Report. It is a general medical and surgical facility. It scored high in patient safety, demonstrating commitment to reducing accidents and medical mistakes.

Jefferson Torresdale Hospital was named one of 18 Philadelphia region hospitals that made Healthgrades' top 250 hospitals for 2019.
