= Jefferson Bucks Hospital =

- Jefferson Health
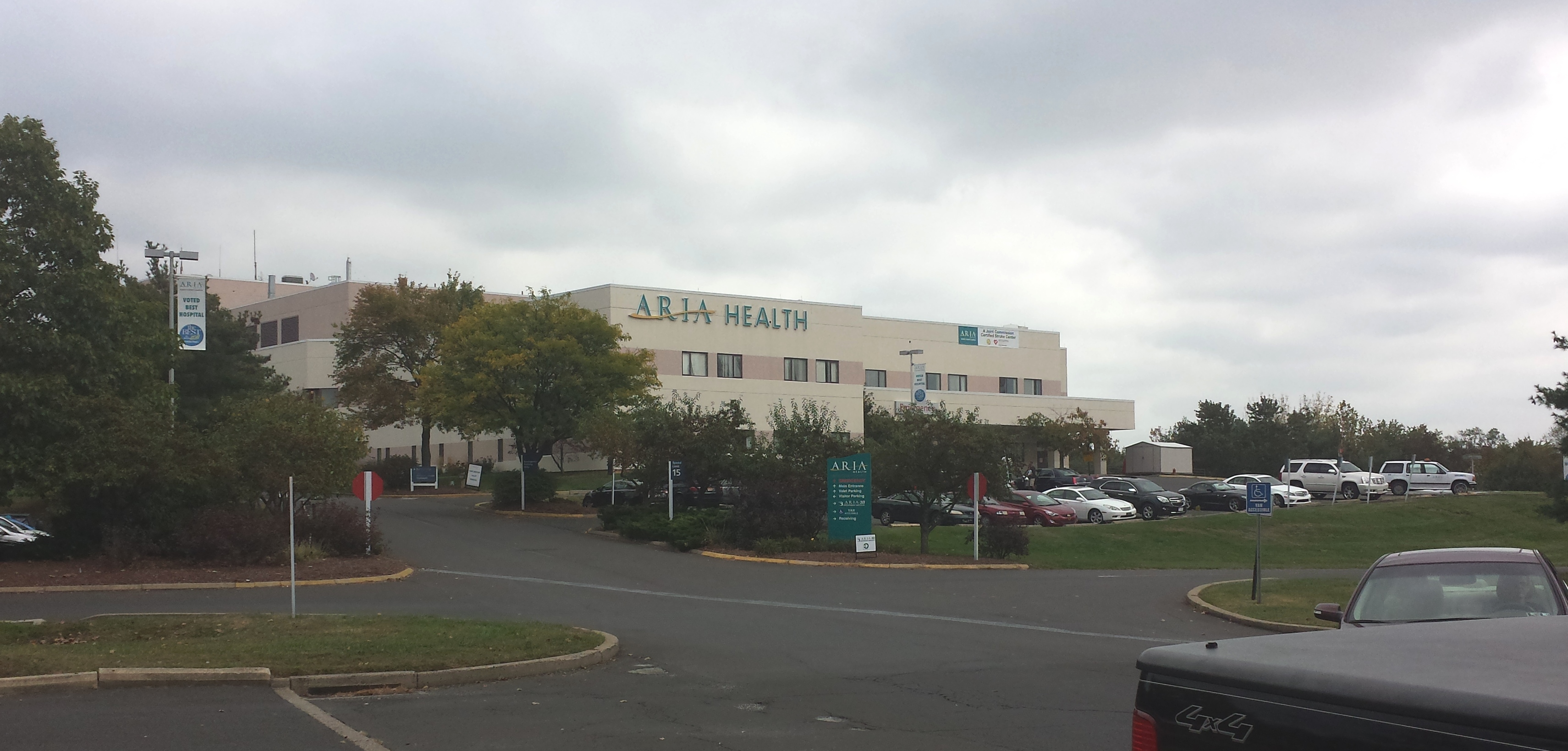
- Jefferson Bucks Hospital

Geography
- Location: 380 North Oxford Valley Rd, Langhorne, Pennsylvania, United States
- Coordinates: 40°11′00″N 74°52′01″W

Organization
- Type: General hospital
- Affiliated university: Jefferson Health

Services
- Emergency department: Not a trauma Center
- Beds: 96

History
- Founded: 1999

Links
- Website: Jefferson Bucks Hospital
- Lists: Hospitals in Pennsylvania

Jefferson Bucks Hospital is a non-profit hospital located in Langhorne, Pennsylvania and is a part of Jefferson Health, a multi-state non-profit health system. The hospital serves as a general hospital of Jefferson Health and is affiliated with a Level II trauma center. The hospital offers 24/7 addiction support. The addiction specialist can assisting in helping patients enter an addiction treatment facility.

== History ==
In 1999, the Aria Health system acquired Delaware Valley Medical Center, which is now called Jefferson Bucks Hospital. It is a 112-bed hospital located in Langhorne, Pennsylvania.

Aria Health sought to build a new 229-bed facility in Lower Makefield to replace Bucks County Hospital. Local residents opposed this project, due to concerns about traffic congestion. In 2013, Aria Health proposed news plans for a "health care village," a facility offering multiple health care services, which may have lower impact on the environment and traffic congestion.

In 2019, Jefferson Frankford Hospital was named one of 18 Philadelphia region hospitals that made Healthgrades' top 250 hospitals for 2019. On July 22, 2019, Jefferson Bucks temporarily lost power due to a storm that left over 9000 residents in Bucks County without power. The hospital relied on a backup source until about 22:00 EST.
