= Friends School Haverford =

Coordinates: 40.01464°N 75.30826°W

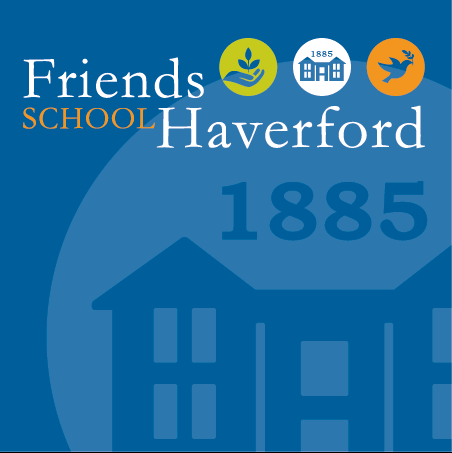
- Haverford, PA, USA

Information
- School type: Private
- Established: 1885
- Headmaster: Andrea Myers
- Grades: N–Fifth grade
- Gender: Co-educational
- Affiliation: Quaker
- Website: www.friendshaverford.org

Friends School Haverford is a private, Quaker school near Philadelphia, Pennsylvania which educates students from Toddlers (starting at 1 year old) through Kindergarten. The school was founded in 1885, and is the oldest Quaker school on Philadelphia's Main Line. Grades Nursery School to Kindergarten are in one building, while grades first grade to fifth grade are in the main building.

Friends School Haverford is under the care of Haverford Monthly Meeting of Friends. It is accredited by the Pennsylvania Association of Independent Schools (PAIS).
