= Jefferson Health =

Multi-state non-profit health system

- Type: Non-profit
- Industry: Healthcare services
- Founded: 1825
- Headquarters: Philadelphia, Pennsylvania, U.S.
- Services: Teaching hospitals; primary, secondary, and tertiary care centers; ambulatory clinics
- Website: jeffersonhealth.org

Jefferson Health is a multi-state nonprofit regional health system based in Philadelphia, Pennsylvania. The health system operates over 30 hospitals and more than 700 care sites, which include outpatient centers, physician practices and specialty institutes across eastern Pennsylvania and southern New Jersey.

Jefferson Health is the clinical arm of the Jefferson enterprise, which also includes Thomas Jefferson University (academic) and Jefferson Health Plans (insurance).

== History ==
=== Founding and Early Development ===
Founded in 1825 as the Infirmary of Jefferson Medical College, it later became known as the Hospital of Jefferson Medical College and then Thomas Jefferson University Hospital.

Thomas Jefferson University Hospital merged with Methodist Hospital in 1996 to create Jefferson Health system.

=== Hospital and Affiliations ===
Since the mid-1990s, Jefferson Health has expanded through a series of mergers and affiliations with regional hospital systems.

- 1996 – Methodist Hospital merges with Jefferson Health to become Jefferson Methodist Hospital.
- 2015 – Abington Health merges with Jefferson to form Jefferson Abington and Jefferson Lansdale hospitals.
- 2016 – Aria Health merges with Jefferson to become Jefferson Frankford, Jefferson Torresdale and Jefferson Buck Hospitals.
- 2017 – Kennedy Health of New Jersey joins Jefferson Health to become Jefferson Cherry Hill Hospital, Jefferson Stratford Hospital and Jefferson Washington Township Hospital.
- 2018 – Magee Rehabilitation Hospital joins Jefferson Health to become Jefferson Moss-Magee Rehabilitation Hospital – Center City.
- 2021 – Einstein Healthcare Network joins Jefferson Health to become Jefferson Einstein Philadelphia and Jefferson Einstein Montgomery hospitals and Jefferson Moss-Magee Rehabilitation – Elkins Park.
- 2024 – Lehigh Valley Health Network joins Jefferson Health, adding 14 hospitals to the network.

== Hospitals and major campuses ==
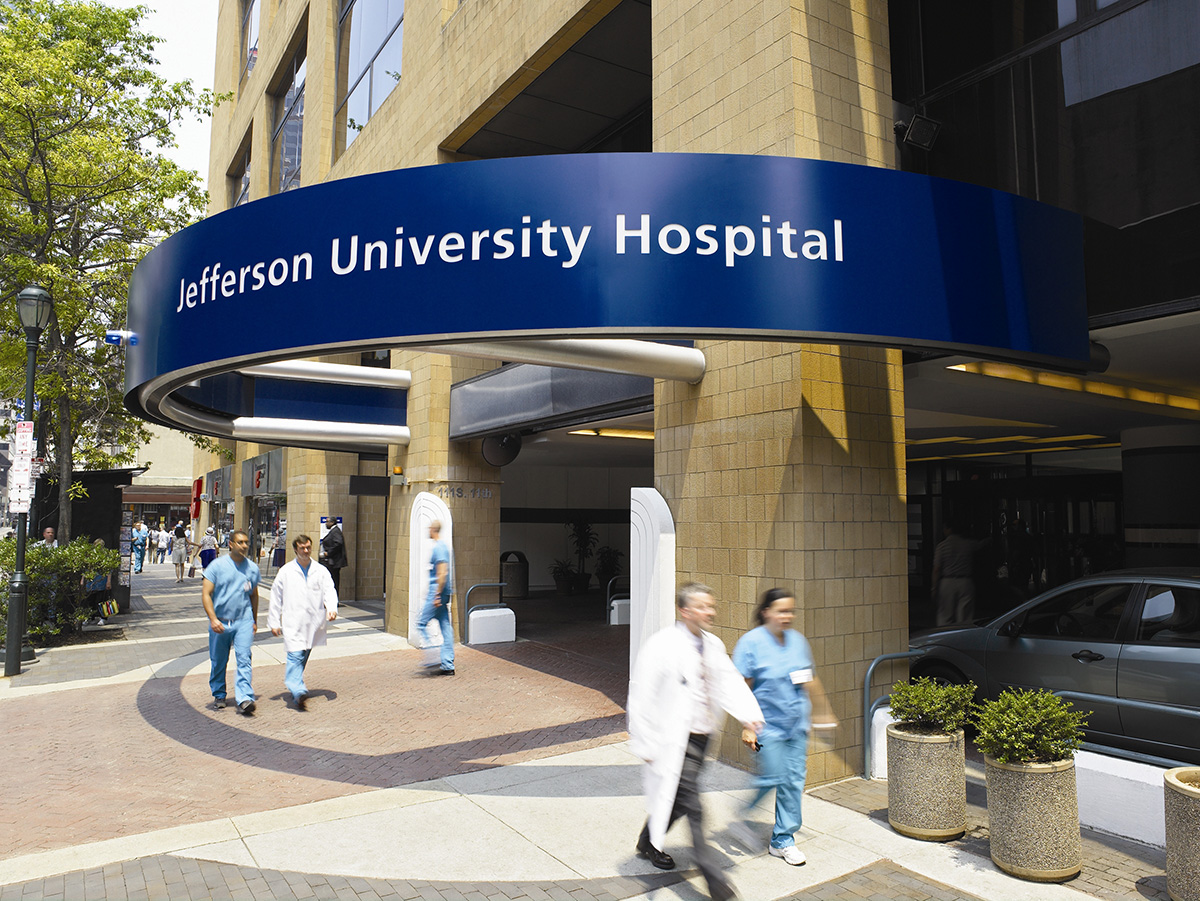
Entrance to Thomas Jefferson University Hospital on South 11th Street in Center City Philadelphia

Jefferson Health comprises the hospitals of:

- Thomas Jefferson University Hospital
- Jefferson Hospital for Neuroscience
- Jefferson Methodist Hospital
- Jefferson Abington Hospital (formerly Abington Memorial Hospital)
- Jefferson Bucks Hospital (formerly part of Aria Health)
- Jefferson Cherry Hill Hospital (formerly Kennedy Hospital and prior that Cherry Hill Medical Center)
- Jefferson Frankford Hospital (formerly part of Aria Health)
- Jefferson Lansdale Hospital
- Jefferson Stratford Hospital
- Jefferson Torresdale Hospital (formerly part of Aria Health)
- Jefferson Washington Township Hospital
- Jefferson Moss-Magee Rehabilitation Hospital – Center City (formerly Magee Rehabilitation)
- Physicians Care Surgical Hospital
- Rothman Orthopaedic Specialty Hospital – Bensalem
- Jefferson Einstein Philadelphia Hospital (formerly Einstein Medical Center Philadelphia)
- Jefferson Einstein Montgomery Hospital (formerly Einstein Medical Center Montgomery)
- Lehigh Valley Hospital–Carbon
- Lehigh Valley Hospital–Cedar Crest
- Lehigh Valley Health Network–1503 N. Cedar Crest
- Lehigh Valley Hospital–Dickson City
- Lehigh Valley Hospital–Gilbertsville
- Lehigh Valley Hospital–Hazleton
- Lehigh Valley Hospital–Hecktown Oaks
- Lehigh Valley Hospital–Macungie
- Lehigh Valley Health Network–Highland Avenue
- Lehigh Valley Hospital–Muhlenberg
- Lehigh Valley Hospital–Pocono
- Lehigh Valley Hospital–Pocono Creek
- Lehigh Valley Hospital–Schuylkill E. Norwegian Street
- Lehigh Valley Hospital–Schuylkill S. Jackson Street
- Lehigh Valley Hospital–17th Street
- Lehigh Valley Reilly Children’s Hospital
- Lehigh Valley Health Network–Tilghman

== Named Institutes/Centers ==
Jefferson Health operates multiple institutes and centers focused on clinical care and medical research.

- Bruce & Robbi Toll Heart and Vascular Institute
- David Farber ASPIRE Center
- Frazier Family Coalition for Stroke Education and Prevention
- Hansjörg Wyss Wellness Center
- Honickman Breast Imaging Center
- Honickman Center
- Jane & Leonard Korman Respiratory Institute – Jefferson Health and National Jewish Health
- Lehigh Valley Fleming Neuroscience Institute
- Lehigh Valley Reilly Children’s Hospital
- Lehigh Valley Topper Cancer Institute
- Marcus Institute of Integrative Health
- MossRehab Institute for Brain Health
- Jefferson Moss Rehabilitation Research Institute
- Muller Institute for Senior Health
- Nicoletti Kidney Transplant Center
- Raphael Center for Neurorestoration
- Sidney Kimmel Comprehensive Cancer Center
- Weinberg ALS Center
- Vickie & Jack Farber Institute for Neuroscience

== National Partnerships ==
=== Philadelphia Eagles ===
In 2024, the Philadelphia Eagles and Jefferson Health announced a multi-year agreement designing the healthcare system as a Proud Partner of the Philadelphia Eagles and Official Health System Partner of the Philadelphia Eagles.

=== The Jefferson Lehigh Valley Classic ===
In April 2025, Jefferson Health, the PGA TOUR Champions and Lehigh Country Club announced a five-year partnership to host the Jefferson Lehigh Valley Classic. The tournament is scheduled to debut in fall 2026 as part of the PGA TOUR Champions series and is expected to be televised nationally.

== See also ==
- List of hospitals in Pennsylvania
