= Jefferson Einstein Hospital =

Coordinates: 40°2′8.4″N 75°8′33.63″W

Jefferson Einstein Philadelphia Hospital
- Jefferson Health

Geography
- Location: 5501 Old York Road, Philadelphia, Pennsylvania, U.S., Philadelphia metropolitan area

Organisation
- Care system: Non-profit
- Type: Teaching

Services
- Emergency department: I
- Beds: 701

Helipads
- Helipad: FAA LID: 2PS9
Number	Length		Surface
Number	ft	m	Surface
H1	100	30	Concrete, Rooftop

History
- Founded: 1866

Links
- Website: www.jeffersonhealth.org/locations/jefferson-einstein-hospital

Jefferson Einstein Philadelphia Hospital (formerly Einstein Medical Center Philadelphia) is a non-profit, teaching and safety net hospital located in North Philadelphia, Pennsylvania, a part of Jefferson Health. The hospital offers residency and fellowship training programs across various specialties. It features a Level I Regional Resource Trauma Center and a Level III Neonatal Intensive Care Unit. As the largest independent teaching hospital in the Philadelphia region, it supports more than 30 accredited programs, training over 3,500 students annually, including 400 residents. In 2021, Einstein Healthcare Network merged with Jefferson Health to create the largest health system in the Philadelphia region.

== History ==
Founded in 1864 as the Jewish Hospital for the Aged, Infirmed and Destitute (also known as Jewish Hospital), its mission was to provide medical care to "the sick and wounded without regard to creed, color or nationality". The Jewish Hospital officially opened its doors to the public in 1866, starting with 22 beds at 56th and Haverford Road in West Philadelphia. In 1873 the hospital moved to its current location on Old York Road in North Philadelphia. The hospital began providing resident-physician medical education in 1892.

=== 20th century ===
By the 20th century, Jewish-sponsored hospitals, such as the Jewish Hospital, became havens for Jewish doctors who could not admit their patients to other hospitals because of anti-Semitism.

In 1951, volunteer president of Mount Sinai Hospital wrote a letter asking physicist Albert Einstein for permission to use his name as part of the hospital. Einstein graciously granted permission in a letter dated June 28, 1951. In 1952, The Jewish Hospital merged with Northern Liberties Hospital and Mount Sinai Hospital to form a single medical center.

=== 21st century ===
Einstein Healthcare Network joined with Jefferson Health, which created an 18-hospital system with 50 outpatient and urgent-care centers, leading rehabilitation and post-acute facilities.

== Residencies and fellowships ==
Since its earlier days, Jefferson Einstein Philadelphia has been a provider of graduate medical education. In 2026, Jefferson Einstein offered 22 ACGME-accredited, 3 CODA-accredited and 1 COPE-accredited program.

== Awards and honors ==
- Level 1 Adult Trauma Center – Pennsylvania Trauma Systems Foundation
- Get with the Guidelines: Gold Plus 2026 – American Heart Association
- Comprehensive Stroke Center – The Joint Commission, American Heart Association, American Stoke Association
- Magnet Recognized – American Nurses Credentialing Center Aortic valve surgery
- High Performing in the following procedures/conditions – U.S. News & World Report:
  - Aortic valve surgery
  - Transcatheter aortic valve replacement
  - Heart failure
  - COPD
  - Kidney failure
