= Main Line Health =

Not-for-profit health system serving portions of Philadelphia and its western suburbs

Main Line Health logo

Main Line Health (MLH) is a not-for-profit health system serving portions of Philadelphia and its western suburbs. It includes four acute care hospitals—Lankenau Medical Center, Bryn Mawr Hospital, Paoli Hospital and Riddle Hospital. This is in addition to Bryn Mawr Rehab Hospital for rehabilitative medicine, Mirmont Treatment Center for drug and alcohol recovery, and the Home Care Network, a home health service. Main Line HealthCare, a regional multi-specialty physician group, is the organization's employed physician group.

The system is led by CEO John Lynch and is chaired by Elizabeth Balderston.
