= Paoli Hospital =

- Main Line Health

Geography
- Location: 255 W Lancaster Ave, Paoli, Pennsylvania, United States
- Coordinates: 40.044°N 75.502°W

Organization
- Type: Specialized
- Network: Main Line Health

Services
- Standards: Joint Commission
- Emergency department: Level II trauma center
- Beds: 231

Helipads
- Helipad: FAA LID: 5PS2
Number	Length		Surface
Number	ft	m	Surface
H1	53	16	Concrete

History
- Founded: July 24, 1913

Links
- Website: www.mainlinehealth.org/locations/paoli-hospital
- Lists: Hospitals in Pennsylvania

Paoli Hospital (formerly known as Paoli Memorial Hospital), is a 231-bed, not-for-profit, acute care hospital in Paoli, Pennsylvania. Founded in 1913, the hospital is part of the Main Line Health system. In 2014, the hospital was re-accredited as a Level II Trauma Center, the only one in Chester County.

Paoli Hospital and its outpatient centers in King of Prussia, Exton and Collegeville offer a range of services and programs, including orthopaedic, maternity, heart and stroke care; a cancer center; The Holloway Breast Center; emergency services and level II trauma center; primary care services and outpatient services.

== Statistics ==
As of April 2022:

- Employees: 1,210
- Licensed beds: 231
- Bassinets: 11
- ER visits: 36,980
- Total discharges: 13,769
- Births: 1,983
- Total surgeries: 7,101
