= Callahan Bright =

American football player (born 1987)

No. 47
- Position: Defensive tackle

Personal information
- Born: January 16, 1987 (age 39); Bryn Mawr, Pennsylvania, U.S.
- Listed height: 6 ft 3 in (1.91 m)
- Listed weight: 340 lb (154 kg)

Career information
- High school: Rosemont (PA) Harriton
- College: Shaw
- NFL draft: 2010: undrafted

Career history
- Jacksonville Sharks (2010); Tulsa Talons (2010); Philadelphia Soul (2011); New Orleans VooDoo (2011); Pittsburgh Power (2012); Wichita Wild (2012–2013)

Career AFL statistics
- Tackles: 10
- Stats at ArenaFan.com

Callahan Bright (born January 16, 1987) is a former American football player. A standout defensive lineman in high school, his career derailed during college. After one season at Division II Shaw University, Bright entered the 2010 NFL draft but was not selected. He had brief stints with various Arena Football League (AFL) teams, and last played for the Wichita Wild.

== Early life ==
A native of Bryn Mawr, Pennsylvania, in the Philadelphia metropolitan area, Bright graduated from Welsh Valley Middle School, and then attended Glen Mills School in Thornbury for two years, a school for court-adjudicated youths. Bright said he was sent there because of “behavioral problems.” As a junior, he transferred to Harriton High School in Rosemont, Pennsylvania, where he was an All-American defensive lineman, while also playing lacrosse and wrestling in the unlimited division at several freestyle tournaments. After recording 86 tackles and 14 sacks in his junior season, Bright was named to USA Today's “2004 preseason Super 25 players”.

Constantly drawing double- and triple-teams by opponents, Bright's dominance was noted by scouts. Tom Lemming of ESPN called him “the most dominating high school defensive lineman that I've seen in five years,” referring to Shaun Cody. At the Elite College Combine in East Rutherford, New Jersey, Bright dominated in one-on-one drills, “tossing” five-star offensive lineman (and future first round NFL draft pick) Eugene Monroe “aside like a rag doll.” “He was so powerful. He always had great leverage and got under taller players, and he had one of the best bull rushes I've ever seen,” said Rivals.com analyst Mike Farrell. Although initially invited to the U.S. Army All-American Bowl, he could not participate due to a suspension that also caused him to miss his final high school game.

Regarded as a five-star recruit by Rivals.com, Bright was listed as the No. 2 defensive tackle prospect of a class that also included Jerrell Powe, Ndamukong Suh, and Dan Williams. Only DeMarcus Granger of Kimball High School in Dallas was ranked in front of him. Recruited by dozens of schools, Bright narrowed his choices down to Miami, Oklahoma, Nebraska, Florida State, Texas A&M, Purdue—where his older brother Eugene played defensive end—and Southern California. He only took two official visits, to Florida State and Texas A&M, in December 2004. During National Signing Day, Bright committed to Florida State on ESPN News. Alongside wide receiver prospect Fred Rouse, Bright was considered to be the cornerstone of the Seminoles' 2005 recruiting class.

== College career ==
Apart from his official visit, Bright never stepped onto the FSU campus in Tallahassee, Florida. Because of his 2.5 core grade point average, he needed to get at least an 820 on the SAT to meet the NCAA's minimum eligibility standards, which he did not. Ineligible for college football, Bright briefly attended Hargrave Military Academy, a prep school in Chatham, Virginia, along with fellow Seminoles recruits Matt Hardrick and Justin Mincey. Bright was ranked as the No. 1 prep school prospect by Scout.com. While the Seminoles had a “painfully thin defensive front,” and were in dire need of a nose guard after the graduation of Brodrick Bunkley, his “onetime heir apparent” Bright did not manage to qualify academically.

Opting for the junior college route, he enrolled at Butler Community College in El Dorado, Kansas, to play football. He went through practice in 2007 but left the school before the season began. The birth of his son altered his career, causing him to take a job as a garbage man in Radnor, Pennsylvania, so he could also take night classes at Delaware County Community College. In July 2007, Bright was arrested in the delivery of marijuana to a Montgomery County police informant. Charged with a felony count of possession with the intent to deliver, Bright pleaded guilty and was sentenced to time served and two years' probation.

Bright eventually wound up at Shaw University located in Raleigh, North Carolina. He spent two years on the scout team before regaining his academic eligibility in 2009. In his only season of college football, he registered 48 tackles, 7.5 tackles for a loss and half a sack, which earning him selection to the CIAA All-Rookie team. He then decided to bypass his senior year and to enter the 2010 NFL draft.

== Professional career ==
=== 2010 NFL draft ===
After preparing for the draft at All-Star Sports Training in Paisley, Florida, Bright was invited to participate at NC State's pro-day, where he demonstrated his raw strength with 41 reps at the bench press, which was only topped among 2010 draft prospects by Mitch Petrus (45). According to Mike Mayock, there was “some interest in him as a late-draftable/preferred free-agent type.”

While seen as a “prototypical nose guard for teams using the 3–4 defensive scheme,” Bright's background issues scared many teams off. He was not selected by any team in the draft.

Pre-draft measurables
Height	Weight	40-yard dash	10-yard split	20-yard split	20-yard shuttle	Three-cone drill	Vertical jump	Broad jump	Bench press
6 ft 2 1/2 in (1.89 m)	342 lb (155 kg)	5.28 s	1.88 s	3.05 s	4.90 s	8.12 s	27 in (0.69 m)	8 ft 4 in (2.54 m)	41 reps
All values from North Carolina State Pro Day (March 24, 2010).

=== Arena Football League ===
Bright then entered the Arena Football League (AFL), first signing with the Jacksonville Sharks and then, over the course of a year and a half, he played for the Philadelphia Soul, New Orleans VooDoo and the Pittsburgh Power before signing with the Wichita Wild midway through the 2012 season. Playing in all seven of the Wild's remaining games last season, Bright tallied 33 total tackles, one and a half sacks and two forced fumbles.
