= Ardmore, Pennsylvania =

Unincorporated community in Pennsylvania, US

- Census-designated place
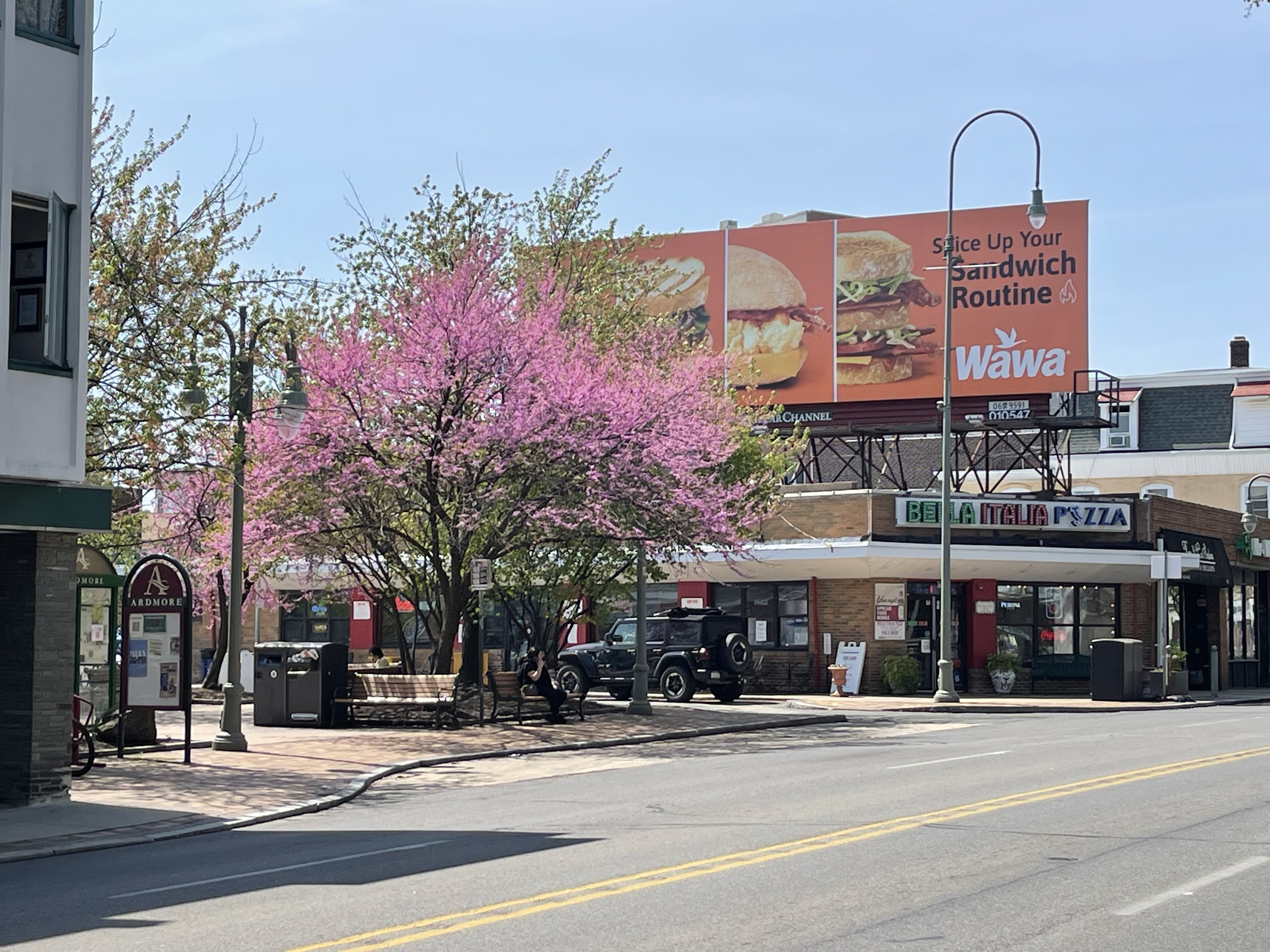
- Schauffele Plaza
- Motto: "The Main Street of the Main Line"
- Location in Delaware County and the U.S. state of Pennsylvania
- Coordinates: 40°00′24″N 75°17′07″W
- Country: United States
- State: Pennsylvania
- Counties: Delaware, Montgomery
- Townships: Haverford, Lower Merion

Area
  - Total: 1.97 sq mi (5.09 km^{2})
  - Land: 1.97 sq mi (5.09 km^{2})
  - Water: 0 sq mi (0.00 km^{2})
- Elevation: 282 ft (86 m)

Population (2020)
  - Total: 13,566
  - Density: 6,899.8/sq mi (2,664.01/km^{2})
- Time zone: UTC-5 (EST)
  - Summer (DST): UTC-4 (EDT)
- ZIP Code: 19003
- Area codes: 610 and 484
- FIPS code: 42-02896

Ardmore is an unincorporated community and census-designated place (CDP) spanning the border between Delaware and Montgomery counties in the U.S. state of Pennsylvania. The population was 12,455 at the time of the 2010 census and had risen to 13,566 in the 2020 census.

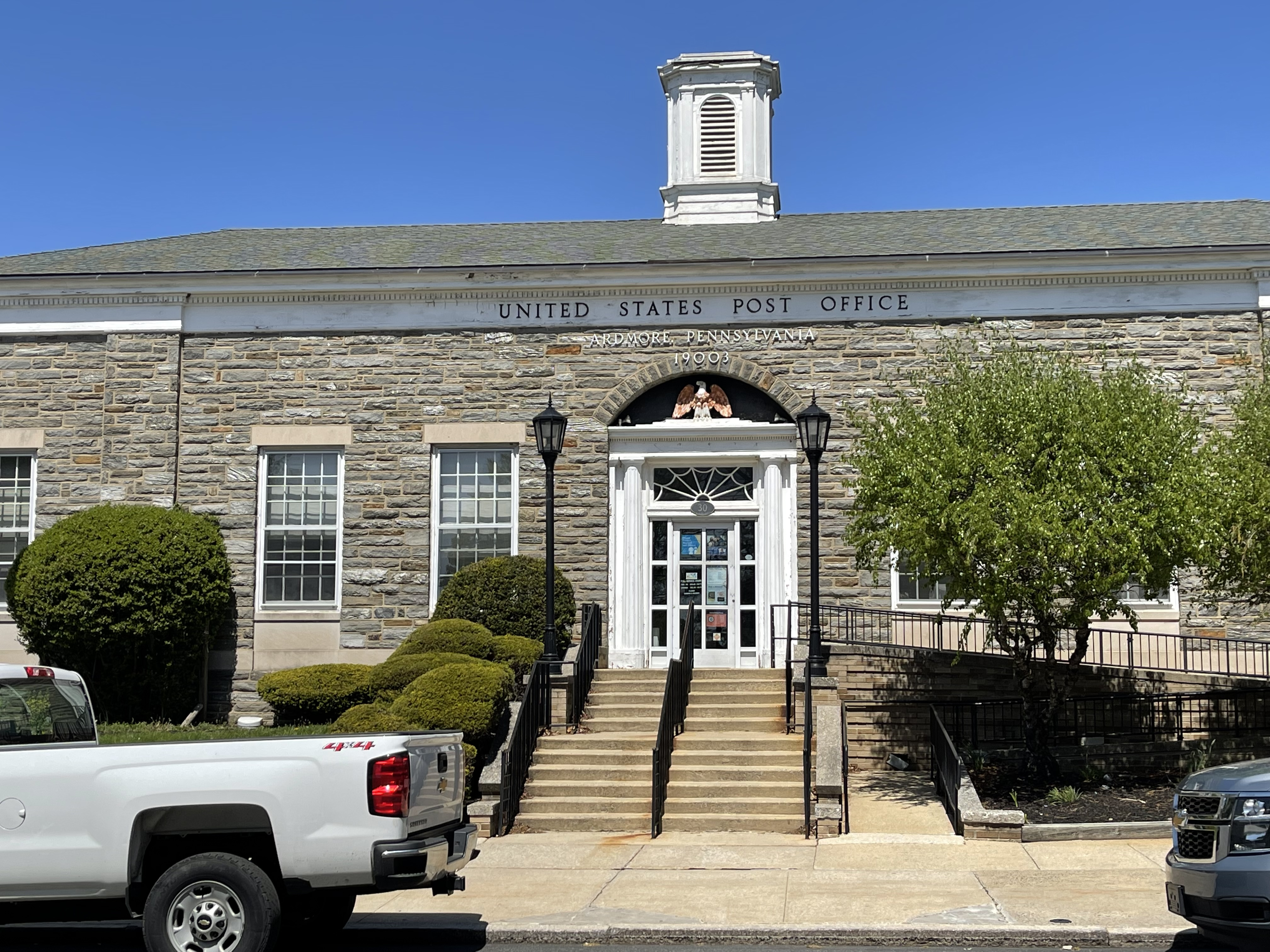
Ardmore post office

Ardmore is a suburb on the west side of Philadelphia within Lower Merion Township in Montgomery County and Haverford Township in Delaware County.

== History ==
Originally named "Athensville" in 1853, the community and its railroad station were renamed Ardmore in 1873 by the Pennsylvania Railroad, on whose Main Line, west out of Philadelphia, Ardmore sits at Milepost 8.5. The Autocar Company moved its headquarters to Ardmore in 1899 and constructed a factory on the edge of the downtown area. The factory closed in 1954; during demolition in 1956, a major fire broke out that threatened the downtown area before it was extinguished. Today, Ardmore consistently ranks among the most desirable suburbs of Philadelphia.

=== Eminent domain controversy ===
In 2004–2006, Ardmore's business district was the subject of a hotly contested eminent domain battle. A grassroots organization, the Save Ardmore Coalition, along with local businesses and other civic groups, opposed an eminent domain/redevelopment program that would have involved the demolition of historic buildings, in favor of preserving those buildings for other commercial use. In March 2006, the Lower Merion Township Board of Commissioners adopted a resolution disavowing the use of eminent domain for private redevelopment projects. The Ardmore battle was also instrumental in prompting the Pennsylvania General Assembly to enact legislation in 2006 restricting the use of eminent domain for private projects.

== Geography ==
According to the U.S. Census Bureau, Ardmore has a total area of 2.0 square miles (5.1 km^{2}), all land. Ardmore is adjacent to Wynnewood (east), Haverford (west), Gladwyne (north), and Havertown (southwest).

Ardmore's downtown, primarily centered around Lancaster Ave, Rittenhouse Place, and Cricket Ave, is home to many shops, restaurants, and small businesses. The western end of downtown features the Ardmore West and Ardmore Plaza Shopping Centers. Similarly, the eastern portion of Ardmore along Lancaster Ave is home to several car dealerships, offices, and apartments, as well as the Wynnewood Plaza Shopping Center. Suburban Square, opened in 1928 as one of the earliest shopping centers in the United States, is located just north of the Ardmore train station. Ardmore contained the nation's first suburban branch of a major department store, the former Strawbridge & Clothier which opened there in 1930.

The Merion Golf Manor neighborhood, named for the adjacent Merion Golf Club, is roughly bounded by Ardmore Avenue to the north, Darby Road to the West, Hathaway Lane to the South, and the Norristown High Speed Line to the East. Another neighborhood in the Haverford Township portion of town is Ardmore Park, roughly bounded by Haverford Road to the South, Ardmore Avenue to the west, and County Line Road to the North. While originally developed and marketed as Ardmore Park, today it is more commonly referred to today as South Ardmore (not to be confused with a separate housing development of the same name located in nearby Havertown). This neighborhood is home to Normandy Park, Chestnutwold Elementary, and businesses along Haverford Road and County Line Road.

Residents from portions of southeastern Ardmore and Wynnewood cooperate as the ArdWood Civic Association. The Ardmore Progressive Civic Association serves the historically black section of Ardmore bordered by ArdWood Civic Association, Haverford College, Montgomery Avenue, and the Montgomery/Delaware County line. The North Ardmore Civic Association represents residents of North Ardmore and Wynnewood north of Montgomery Avenue. The South Ardmore Betterment Alliance is a community group in the Haverford Township portion of Ardmore which organizes various community activities.

== Demographics ==
Historical population
Census	Pop.	Note	%±
1990	12,646		—
2000	12,616		−0.2%
2010	12,455		−1.3%
2020	13,566		8.9%

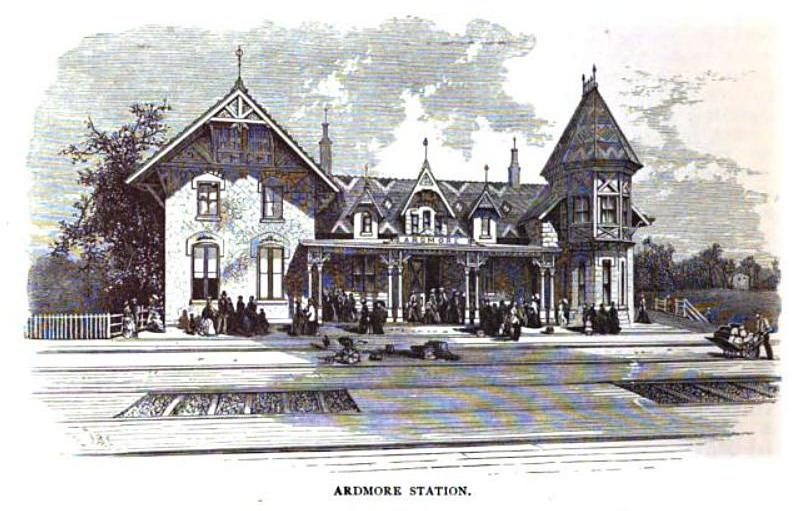
Drawing of Ardmore train station c. 1875

=== 2020 census ===
As of the 2020 census, Ardmore had a population of 13,566. The median age was 39.5 years. 21.8% of residents were under the age of 18, and 18.6% of residents were 65 years of age or older. For every 100 females, there were 90.2 males, and for every 100 females age 18 and over, there were 87.1 males age 18 and over.

100.0% of residents lived in urban areas, while 0.0% lived in rural areas.

There were 5,873 households in Ardmore, of which 27.9% had children under the age of 18 living in them. Of all households, 44.5% were married-couple households, 17.5% were households with a male householder and no spouse or partner present, and 32.0% were households with a female householder and no spouse or partner present. About 35.3% of all households were made up of individuals, and 14.4% had someone living alone who was 65 years of age or older.

There were 6,185 housing units, of which 5.0% were vacant. The homeowner vacancy rate was 0.8% and the rental vacancy rate was 5.1%.

Racial composition as of the 2020 census
Race	Number	Percent
White	9,961	73.4%
Black or African American	1,627	12.0%
American Indian and Alaska Native	21	0.2%
Asian	772	5.7%
Native Hawaiian and Other Pacific Islander	8	0.1%
Some other race	244	1.8%
Two or more races	933	6.9%
Hispanic or Latino (of any race)	698	5.1%

=== 2010 census ===
As of the 2010 census, the CDP was 76.8% White, 12.9% Black or African American, 0.1% Native American, 4.1% Asian, 0.1% Native Hawaiian and Other Pacific Islander, 1.2% were Some Other Race, and 2.3% were two or more races. 4.0% of the population were of Hispanic or Latino ancestry.

=== 2000 census ===
As of the 2000 census, there were 12,616 people, 5,529 households, and 3,129 families residing in Ardmore. The population density was 6,588.5 inhabitants per square mile (2,543.8/km^{2}). There were 5,711 housing units at an average density of 2,982.5 per square mile (1,151.5/km^{2}). The racial makeup of the CDP was 83.51% White, 11.47% African American, 0.12% Native American, 2.58% Asian, 0.13% Pacific Islander, 0.59% from other races, and 1.60% from two or more races. Hispanic or Latino of any race were 2.05% of the population.

There were 5,529 households, out of which 23.9% included children under the age of 18, 43.0% were married couples living together, 10.7% had a female householder with no husband present, and 43.4% were non-families. 34.7% of all households were made up of individuals, and 12.5% had someone living alone who was 65 years of age or older. The average household size was 2.27 and the average family size was 2.98.

In the CDP, the population was spread out, with 20.3% under the age of 18, 7.5% from 18 to 24, 32.1% from 25 to 44, 23.1% from 45 to 64, and 17.0% who were 65 years of age or older. The median age was 38 years. For every 100 females, there were 86.9 males. For every 100 females age 18 and over, there were 84.9 males.

The median income for a household in the CDP was $60,966, and the median income for a family was $75,828. Males had a median income of $46,920 versus $40,802 for females. The per capita income for the CDP was $36,111. About 2.4% of families and 4.9% of the population were below the poverty line, including 3.1% of those under age 18 and 6.2% of those age 65 or over.

== Arts and culture ==
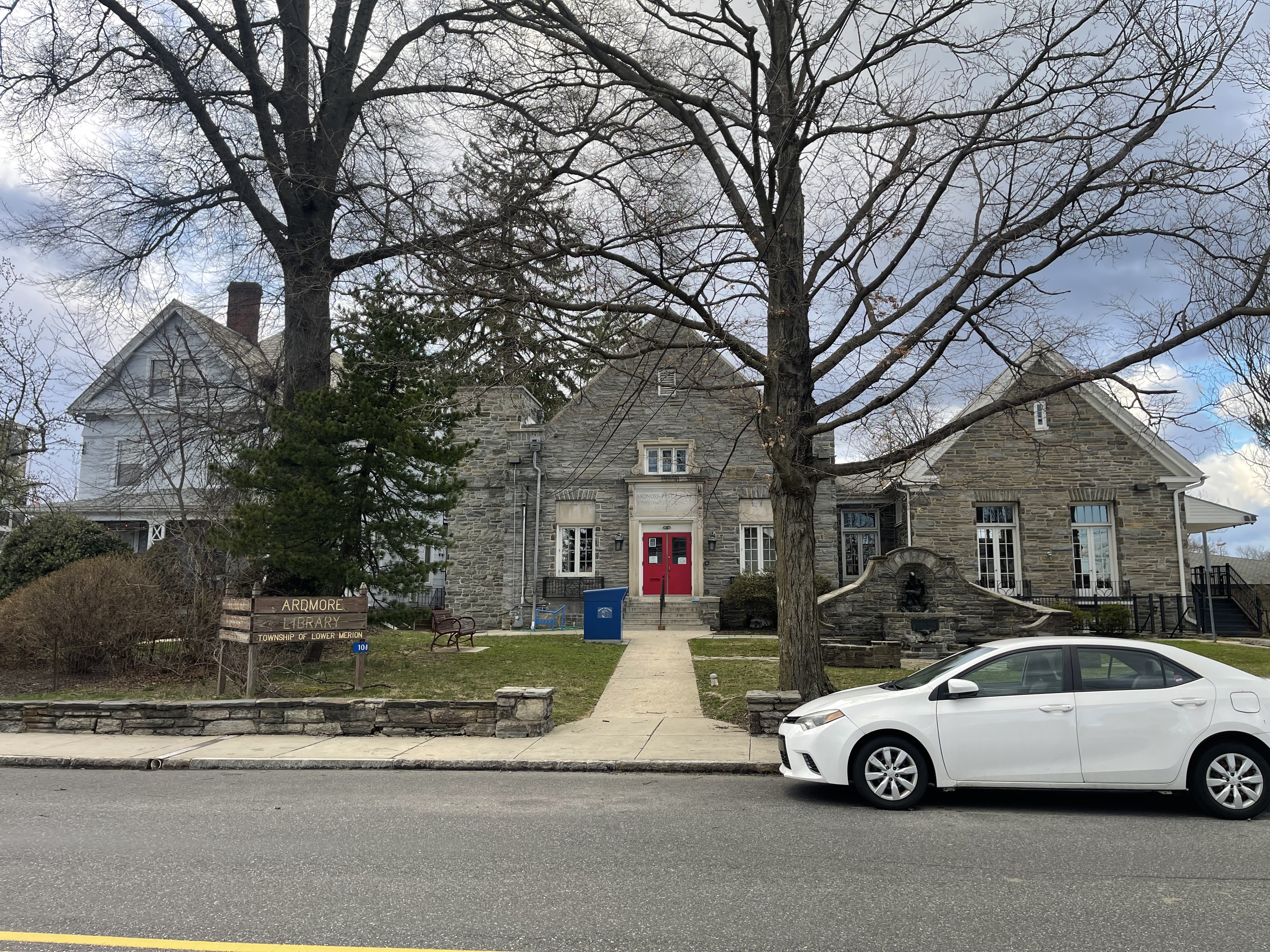
Ardmore Public Library, opened in 1899, part of the Lower Merion Library System.

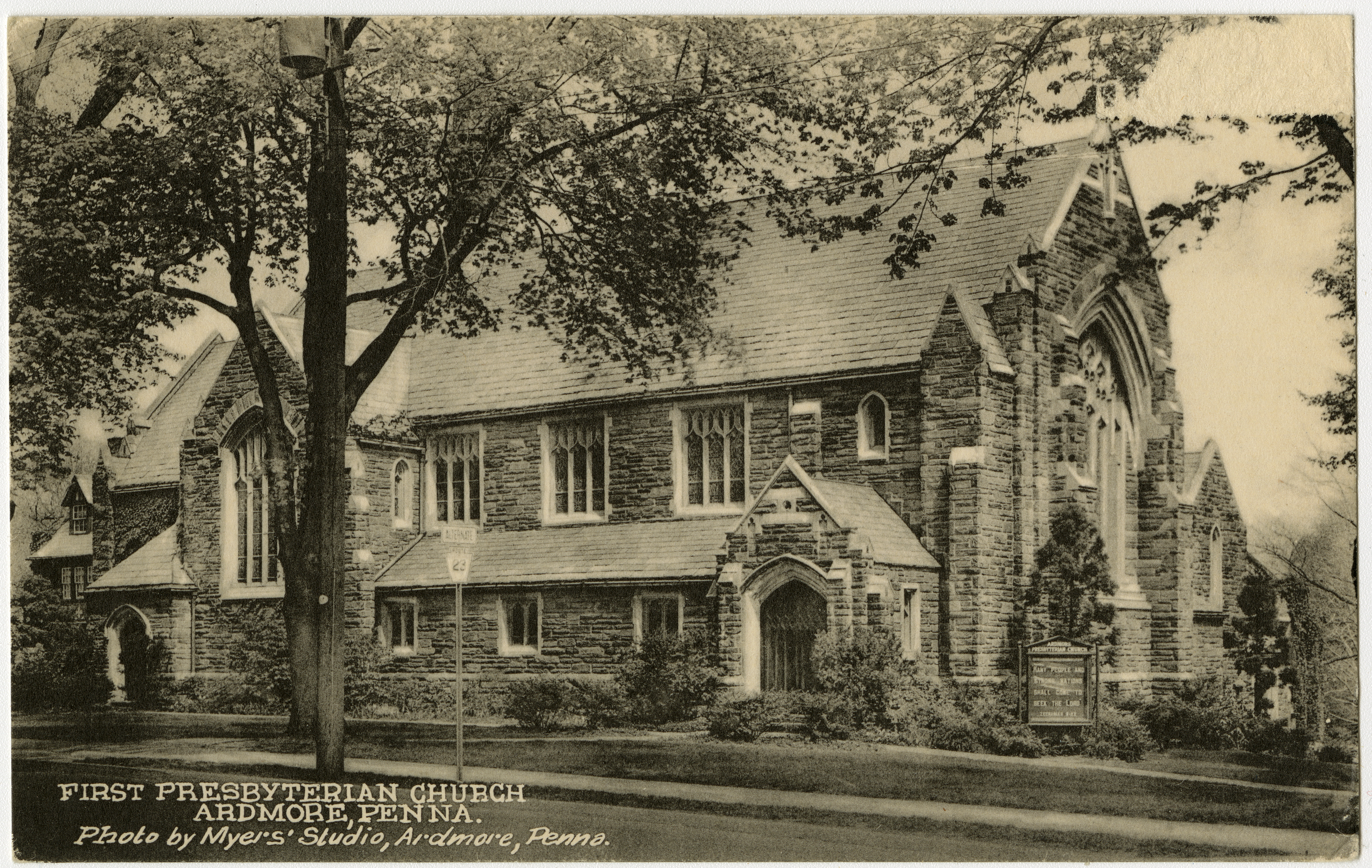
Ardmore Presbyterian Church, on an early postcard

== Parks and recreation ==
There are several recreation areas, including Linwood Park, Normandy Park, the Ardmore Ice Skating Club, and Vernon V. Young Memorial Park (home to the Ardmore Ave Pool and the community center known as "The Shack"). South Ardmore Park is located in neighboring Wynnewood, and Merwood Park and Elwell Field are both adjacent to Ardmore. The Ardmore Post Office and Ardmore Public Library (part of the Lower Merion Library System) are both found on Ardmore Ave, and the Merion Fire Company of Ardmore is located nearby on Greenfield Ave.

Two sites, located in the Haverford Township section of Ardmore, the Merion Golf Club East Course and Pont Reading are listed on the National Register of Historic Places.

== Education ==
Pupils living in the Lower Merion Township portion attend schools in the Lower Merion School District (LMSD), while pupils living in the Haverford Township portion attend schools in the School District of Haverford Township.

As of 2024, in regards to the Lower Merion Township section, school zoning is as follows: Most of it is zoned to Penn Valley Elementary School, while portions are zoned to Penn Wynne and Gladwyne elementaries. For middle school, most of the section is zoned to Welsh Valley Middle School, while some of it is zoned to Black Rock Middle School. For high school, there are portions in the Lower Merion High School walking zone, some in the Harriton High School area, and some in a choice area where students may choose between Harriton and Lower Merion high schools.

Among the many notable graduates of Lower Merion High School in Ardmore are General Henry H. "Hap" Arnold (1903), Commanding General of the U.S. Army Air Forces in WWII; General Alexander M. Haig Jr. (1942), the 59th United States Secretary of State; James H. Billington (1946), the Librarian of Congress, and; Kobe Bryant (1996), NBA Hall of Fame basketball player.

Ardmore Avenue Elementary School, of the LMSD district and in the African-American section of Ardmore, had 80% of its students as African-Americans. The district closed the school in 1963 during the Civil Rights Movement. An LMSD website stated that the school had a building that was in a poor condition and that the dissolution of the school was "marking the beginning of the true desegregation at the primary level". By 1996, South Ardmore residents were divided between three elementary schools, but that year there was a plan to rezone so two elementary schools instead of three had portions of the community.

== Infrastructure ==
=== Transit ===
Ardmore station is served by SEPTA Regional Rail's Paoli/Thorndale Line (commuter) and Amtrak (intercity) passenger trains. Additionally, the Norristown High Speed Line runs through the Haverford Township portion of town, and Ardmore Junction, Wynnewood Road, and Ardmore Avenue stations are all within or adjacent to the boundaries of Ardmore.

A streetcar line built by the Ardmore and Llanerch Street Railway in 1902 once ran from the 69th Street Transportation Center in Upper Darby to a two-track terminal in downtown Ardmore, now the site of Schauffele Plaza. After the line was acquired by SEPTA in the 1960s, it was converted to a bus route. A section of the line, running alongside Pont Reading Creek and Hathaway Lane, was paved over and is now used by SEPTA as a private busway.

== Notable people ==
- Henry H. "Hap" Arnold, Commanding General of the United States Army Air Forces in all theaters throughout World War II, first United States Air Force five-star general
- Richie Ashburn, member of the Major League Baseball Hall of Fame, outfielder and broadcaster for the Philadelphia Phillies
- Kobe Bryant, National Basketball Association player, member of the Los Angeles Lakers
- Jervis Burdick (1889-1962), Olympic high jumper in the 1912 Olympics
- Russell Carter, former cornerback for the New York Jets and Los Angeles Raiders
- Larry Christenson, former pitcher for the Philadelphia Phillies
- Johnny Christmas, professional lacrosse player with the Philadelphia Wings and the Boston Cannons
- Kate Flannery, actress (plays Meredith on NBC prime time comedy series The Office)
- Mark Gerban, first person to represent the State of Palestine at the World Championships in rowing
- Alexander Haig, United States Army general, Chairman of the Joint Chiefs of Staff, and United States Secretary of State
- Harry Hawk, American actor and comedian, on stage at Ford's Theatre at the moment Abraham Lincoln was shot
- Owen Jones, U.S. Representative from Pennsylvania
- A. Atwater Kent, early radio manufacturer and philanthropist, established the Museum of Philadelphia History
- Brandon Moore, National Football League player
- Paul B. Moses, art historian and educator at the University of Chicago
- Mike Pedicin, American jazz bandleader
- J. Howard Pew, son of Joseph Newton Pew, founder of Sun Oil Company; his estate "Knollbrook" is located on a tall hill barely visible above the intersection of Grays Lane and Mill Creek Road, touching Ardmore, Gladwyne, and Haverford
- Michael Sembello, an American singer, guitarist, keyboardist, songwriter, composer and producer
- Lou Spears, racing driver

== In popular culture ==
- Lieutenant Joe Cable, from the Rodgers and Hammerstein musical South Pacific
