= Jonathan Goldstein (filmmaker) =

American filmmaker

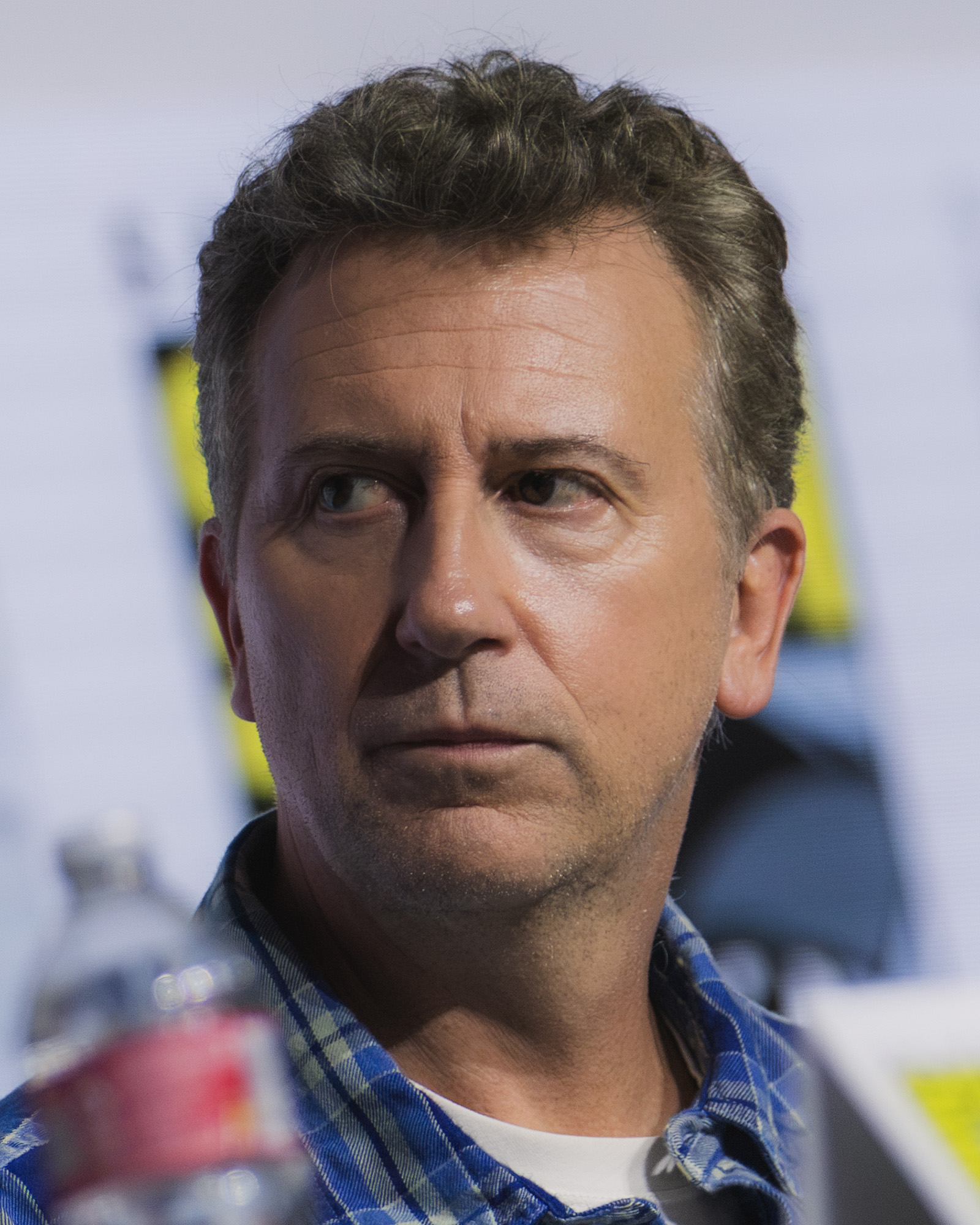
- Goldstein at the 2026 San Diego Comic-Con
- Born: Jonathan Michael Goldstein; September 2, 1968 (age 58); New York City, U.S.
- Education: University of Michigan; Harvard Law School
- Occupations: Film director, screenwriter, producer
- Years active: 1999–present
- Spouse: Adena Halpern (m. 2007)

Jonathan Michael Goldstein (born September 2, 1968) is an American filmmaker, best known for his work on Dungeons & Dragons: Honor Among Thieves, Game Night, Spider-Man: Homecoming, and Horrible Bosses. He has formed a filmmaking duo with John Francis Daley, whom he met on The Geena Davis Show.

== Personal life ==
Born in New York City, Goldstein moved to Beachwood, Ohio, in 1980, where he graduated from Beachwood High School in 1986. He attended the University of Michigan and then Harvard Law School, graduating in 1995. He worked for two years as a corporate litigator at the New York office of Jones, Day, Reavis & Pogue. Goldstein lives in Los Angeles with his wife, novelist Adena Halpern, who he married in 2007.

== Career ==
Finding the legal profession less than fulfilling, he moved to Los Angeles in 1998 to pursue a career in comedy writing. Shortly thereafter, he began writing for network television comedies, including The PJs starring Eddie Murphy, The Geena Davis Show, Good Morning Miami, Four Kings, and The New Adventures of Old Christine.

In 2007, in collaboration with his writing partner, John Francis Daley, Goldstein sold his first film script, The $40,000 Man, to New Line Cinema. Since that first sale, Goldstein and Daley have been engaged on a number of other feature projects, including Hours of Fun, The Incredible Burt Wonderstone, starring Steve Carell and Jim Carrey, Cal of the Wild for Steven Spielberg and DreamWorks, and an adaptation of the documentary Of All the Things for Warner Bros. Pictures, also with Steve Carell set to play the lead.

New Line's Horrible Bosses was released on July 8, 2011, and made over $200 million in worldwide box office. In 2009, the team were hired to rewrite the sequel to the animated film, Cloudy with a Chance of Meatballs.

Goldstein and Daley co-wrote and directed their script for Vacation, a follow-up to the 1983 comedy film National Lampoon's Vacation. Ed Helms played the adult Rusty Griswold. The film grossed $104 million in worldwide box office off a budget of $32 million. They were co-story writers for Horrible Bosses 2 (2014).

Goldstein and Daley wrote the screenplay for the 2017 film Spider-Man: Homecoming, and were both considered to direct before Jon Watts was hired.

Goldstein and Daley directed the 2018 black comedy Game Night, based on a screenplay by Mark Perez which they rewrote. The film, starring Jason Bateman and Rachel McAdams, "earned a raft of glowing reviews for its whip-smart script, energetic performances, and deliberate avoidance of modern comedy's ubiquitous tropes," and grossed $117 million at the worldwide box office, versus a $37 million budget. While they did not receive screenwriter credit, they later said they rewrote "almost all of the original script's dialogue, totally overhauled the characters — most notably a creepy cop portrayed by Jesse Plemons — and comprehensively reworked the original script's third act."

In 2018, it was announced that the filmmaking duo would direct a film adaptation of DC Comics' The Flash for the DC Extended Universe, but it was announced in July that they have left the project. Despite this, both Goldstein and Daley received story by credit alongside Joby Harold.

In 2019, it was announced that Goldstein and Daley were in talks be directing the reboot of Dungeons & Dragons: Honor Among Thieves (2023). In January 2020, it was announced that, in addition to directing, they would be writing a new draft of the screenplay. As of May 11, 2023, Dungeons & Dragons: Honor Among Thieves has grossed $91.4 million in the United States and Canada, and $111.6 million in other territories, for a worldwide total of $203 million.

Goldstein and Daley wrote and directed the 2026 action comedy Mayday, an original feature for Skydance and Apple that stars Ryan Reynolds and Kenneth Branagh.

== Filmography ==
Short film

Year	Title	Director	Writer
2001	What Babies Do	Yes	No
2011	Audio Tour	Yes	Yes

Feature film

Year	Title	Director	Writer	Producer
2011	Horrible Bosses	No	Yes	No
2013	The Incredible Burt Wonderstone	No	Yes	No
2013	Cloudy with a Chance of Meatballs 2	No	Yes	No
2014	Horrible Bosses 2	No	Story	No
2015	Vacation	Yes	Yes	No
2017	Spider-Man: Homecoming	No	Yes	No
2018	Game Night	Yes	Uncredited	No
2019	Stuber	No	No	Yes
2021	Vacation Friends	No	Yes	No
2023	Dungeons & Dragons: Honor Among Thieves	Yes	Yes	Executive
2023	The Flash	No	Story	No
2025	A Minecraft Movie	No	Uncredited	No
2026	Mayday	Yes	Yes	Yes

Television

Year	Title	Director	Writer	Executive Producer	Notes
2011	Bones	No	Yes	No	Episode "The Truth in the Myth"
2019	In the Dark	Yes	No	Consulting	Episode "All About the Benjamin"
2021	Welcome to Georgia	No	Yes	Yes	
2024	Hysteria!	No	No	Yes	
