= Eugene Bright =

American football player (born 1985)

No. 87
- Position: Tight end

Personal information
- Born: April 18, 1985 (age 41); Bryn Mawr, Pennsylvania
- Listed height: 6 ft 4 in (1.93 m)
- Listed weight: 268 lb (122 kg)

Career information
- High school: Rosemont (PA) Harriton
- College: Purdue
- NFL draft: 2009: undrafted

Career history
- Philadelphia Eagles (2009)*; Pittsburgh Steelers (2009–2010)*
- * Offseason or practice squad member only
- Stats at Pro Football Reference

Eugene Stanley Bright (born April 18, 1985) is an American former football tight end. He was signed by the Philadelphia Eagles as a street free agent in 2009. He played college football at Purdue. He is the older brother of Callahan Bright.

== Professional career ==
=== Philadelphia Eagles ===
After being undrafted in the 2008 NFL draft, Bright signed with the Philadelphia Eagles on April 23, 2009. He was waived on September 4, 2009.

=== Pittsburgh Steelers ===
Bright was signed to the Pittsburgh Steelers practice squad on November 2, 2009. He was signed to the active roster on January 6, 2010. After being released on September 4, 2010, he was again signed to the practice squad on September 6, 2010.
