= Paul B. Moses =

American art historian and educator (1929–1966)

Paul Bell Moses
- Born: December 9, 1929; Ardmore, Pennsylvania, U.S.
- Died: March 24, 1966 (aged 36); Chicago, Illinois, U.S.
- Cause of death: Murder
- Burial place: West Laurel Hill Cemetery, Bala Cynwyd, Pennsylvania, U.S.
- Occupations: Art historian, educator

Academic background
- Education: Lower Merion High School
- Alma mater: Haverford College (BA); Harvard University (MA)

Academic work
- Discipline: Art history
- Sub-discipline: Impressionism
- Institutions: University of Chicago

Paul Bell Moses (December 9, 1929 – March 24, 1966) was an American art historian and educator who specialized in 19th-century French art. He taught at the Barnes Foundation, Lincoln University, and University of Chicago from 1962 to 1966.

== Early life and education ==
Moses was born on December 9, 1929, in Ardmore, Pennsylvania, to Paul S. Moses, a house painter, and Annie Moses, a laundry worker. He graduated from Lower Merion High School in 1947. He enrolled at Haverford College as one of its first African American students in 1948. He endured racism at Haverford, living at home as a freshman because white students refused to room with him. He developed a passion for art and art history and became a protégé of art collector and philanthropist Albert C. Barnes, founder of the Barnes Foundation, which awarded Moses a scholarship that enabled him to study abroad at the Sorbonne and the École du Louvre during his junior year. Barnes wrote letters of introduction to French curators and collectors on his protégé's behalf. Moses graduated magna cum laude from Haverford in 1951.

Moses served as a private in the United States Army from 1952 to 1954 as an interpreter in France. After completing his military service, he taught briefly at the Barnes Foundation and Lincoln University in Philadelphia. He taught at the American Overseas School of Rome from 1957 to 1959. While in Italy, Moses appeared as an extra in the 1959 film Ben-Hur. His time in France and Italy gained him fluency in French and Italian. Returning stateside in 1959, Moses completed a master's degree in fine arts at Harvard University and worked as a teaching fellow while pursuing his PhD. His dissertation focused on the etchings and monotypes of French Impressionist Edgar Degas.

== Career ==
Moses moved to Hyde Park, Chicago, and became an instructor in the Department of Art at the University of Chicago in the fall of 1962. He taught courses on 19th-century French prints and French Impressionism along with other classes in the humanities. He caused a stir when he refused to teach The Adventures of Huckleberry Finn because of the novel's treatment of race, which he saw as diminishing to Black people. Liked and respected by his fellow faculty, Moses was promoted to the rank of assistant professor of Art and the Humanities in November 1964, becoming one of only a handful of Black faculty at the University of Chicago.

In December 1963, Arts et Métiers Graphiques invited Moses to publish a major catalogue raisonné of Edgar Degas. In 1964, he curated an exhibition of Degas's prints at the Renaissance Society in Chicago. He received a prestigious Whitney Foundation grant to conduct research in France in 1963 and received an Inland Steel Faculty Fellowship in 1964. Regularly in demand as a lecturer and jurist for art shows, "he appears to have often been the only Black person in attendance at these events," reflecting his trailblazing role in the art world in Chicago and beyond. He also published reviews in the arts section of the Chicago Daily News. Throughout his life, Moses sketched and painted, especially landscapes inspired by the Impressionist artists he studied. He also collected art, especially French Impressionist art, including a monotype attributed to Camille Pissarro and prints by Honoré Daumier.

== Personal life and death ==
While studying at Harvard, Moses met Alice Johnson, an elementary school science teacher and alumna of Cheyney State Teacher's College. After the couple married in the spring of 1962 and moved to Chicago, Johnson taught at the University of Chicago Laboratory Schools, a private school affiliated with the university, for more than 20 years before her death in 1994. She was the first African American and first woman to serve as president of the National Science Teachers Association. Paul and Alice's son, Michael Moses, born in 1963, attended Whittier College and taught physical education at the Laboratory Schools for over 30 years.

On the evening of March 24, 1966, Paul Moses was carjacked while driving alone in north Chicago. Two young white males, a 20-year-old and a 16-year-old, fatally shot him in the back of the head and stole his car. Moses died at the age of 36. His body was found in Portage Park. Interrogated by police, the suspects claimed that Moses had "proposed they take part in an unnatural act," leading to a confrontation that culminated in Moses's murder. The carjacking motive was established in court, and both defendants were convicted. The adult received a prison sentence of 14 to 30 years, and the 16-year-old was committed to juvenile detention.

Moses was interred at West Laurel Hill Cemetery in Bala Cynwyd, Pennsylvania.

== Legacy ==
Moses's research influenced Jean Adhémar's and Françoise Cachin’s Degas: The Complete Etchings, Lithographs and Monotypes, published in French in 1973 and in English a year later. In 1983, Haverford College established the Paul B. Moses Scholarship Fund, which is awarded annually to students who embody "the character, talent and qualities of Paul Moses." In 2022, the University of Chicago Library hosted an exhibit on Moses as a "trailblazing art historian." His son, Michael Moses, along with University of Chicago graduate student Stephanie Strother, curated the exhibit at the Regenstein Library. In 2023, the Barnes Foundation hosted an exhibit about the Foundation's scholarship recipients from 1927 to 1949, featuring Moses as one of four notable recipients.
