= Mark Gerban =

American rower (born 1979)

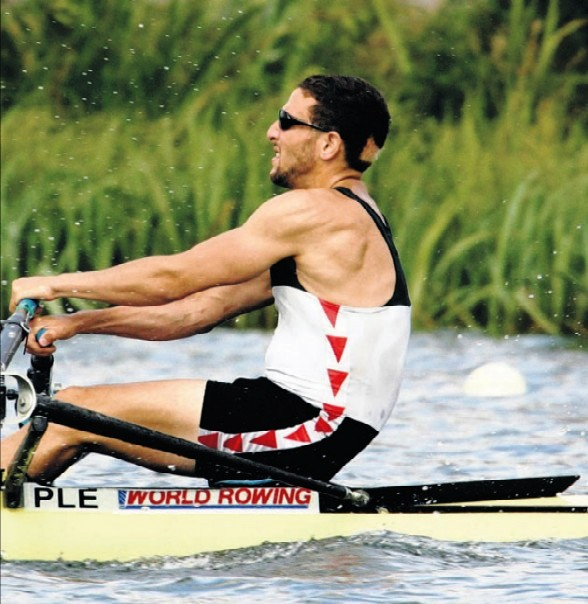
- Mark Gerban racing the Lightweight Men's Single at the World Championships

Personal information
- Nationality: American, German, Israeli, Palestinian
- Born: November 30, 1979 (age 46) Philadelphia, Pennsylvania, U.S.
- Spouse: Hanna Gerban

Sport
- Country: Palestine
- Sport: Rowing
- College team: Drexel Dragons
- Coached by: Iradj El-Qalqili, Martin Strohmenger, Rita Hendes

Achievements and titles
- World finals: 2005 (16th), 2006 (18th), 2007 (16th)
- National finals: 2003 US National Champion (LM2X)
- Highest world ranking: 16th

Mark Gerban (born November 30, 1979) is an American professional rower. He represented the State of Palestine at the 2005 World Championships. Competing in the Lightweight Men's Single, he had the highest-placed World Championship finish (16th) of a Palestinian athlete in any sport (excluding Special Olympics events).

== Biography ==
Mark Gerban was born in Philadelphia to an American Jewish mother and an Israeli-Arab father from the village of Jisr az-Zarqa.

Gerban graduated from Lower Merion High School in Ardmore, Pennsylvania, in 1998. While there he was taught to scull by Coach Harold Finigan. In 2003, he graduated from Drexel University with a triple major in Production Operations Management, Economics, and International Business. From 1998 until 2001 he was a member of AEPi

== Rowing career ==
While at Drexel on an athletic scholarship, he competed with the NCAA Division I Varsity Swimming program, where he was a multiple America East Conference Swimming Champion. During the off-season, he became a multiple Royal Canadian Henley Regatta and US National Champion in rowing and was the swimming representative for the Student Athlete Advisory Board (SAAB) at Drexel.

He worked for two years for the CIGNA Corporation before becoming a professional rower in 2005. During this time, he trained and competed with German National and Olympic Team athletes. He was fully sponsored by the Palestinian Rowing Federation, and sent to train under coach Martin Strohmenger and Rita Hendes in Hamburg, Germany. He trained at the Ruder-Gesellschaft HANSA e.V., located along the banks of the Alster and competed in international events for Palestine:

2005	2006	2007	2008
Rowing World Cup – Lucerne, Switzerland	Rowing World Cup – Munich, Germany	Rowing World Cup – Amsterdam, Netherlands	Asian Olympic Qualification Regatta – Shanghai, China
World Rowing Championships – Gifu, Japan	Rowing World Cup – Lucerne, Switzerland	Rowing World Cup – Lucerne, Switzerland	
Asian National Championships – Hyderabad, India	World Rowing Championships – Eton, Great Britain	World Rowing Championships – Munich, Germany	

== Patents ==
Mark Gerban is credited with nearly 50-published patent filings in the automobile industry for Mercedes-Benz and other companies.

== Authorship ==
In 2024, Mark Gerban published his memoir, *The Jew Who Rowed For Palestine: An Israeli-Palestinian's Search for Identity*, which was released on Amazon on October 16. The book chronicles Gerban's unique journey of self-discovery and resilience, exploring themes of identity and the Israeli-Palestinian conflict through his personal and athletic experiences.

== Public Reactions & Responses ==
Prior to his graduation from Drexel University in 2003, Gerban wrote a series of articles for the student newspaper, The Triangle, offering his perspective on the Israeli-Palestinian conflict as someone from both sides. He claims his intention was to promote peaceful dialogue, but he was accused of being pro-Palestinian and anti-Semitic. A public protest was organized at Drexel University to counter his arguments.

Daniel Pipes published an op-ed in The Jewish Exponent describing Gerban's writing as "the literary equivalent of the suicide bombers." Gerban responded that he thought Palestinians and Israelis could live together and his family proved it. He urged the parties to put their differences aside before it was too late.

It was after this incident that he considered rowing for Palestine. Following this decision, he claims he was subjected to discrimination. He says that he had been a member and live-in resident of Malta Boat Club along Boathouse Row in Philadelphia, but was forced out on the grounds of "representing a country associated with terrorism". The Palestinian Rowing Federation filed a complaint with USRowing against Malta Boat Club, but no basis was found for the complaint. Gerban then moved to Germany with full sponsorship of the Palestinian Rowing Federation.
