= Dan Williams (defensive tackle) =

American football player (born 1987)

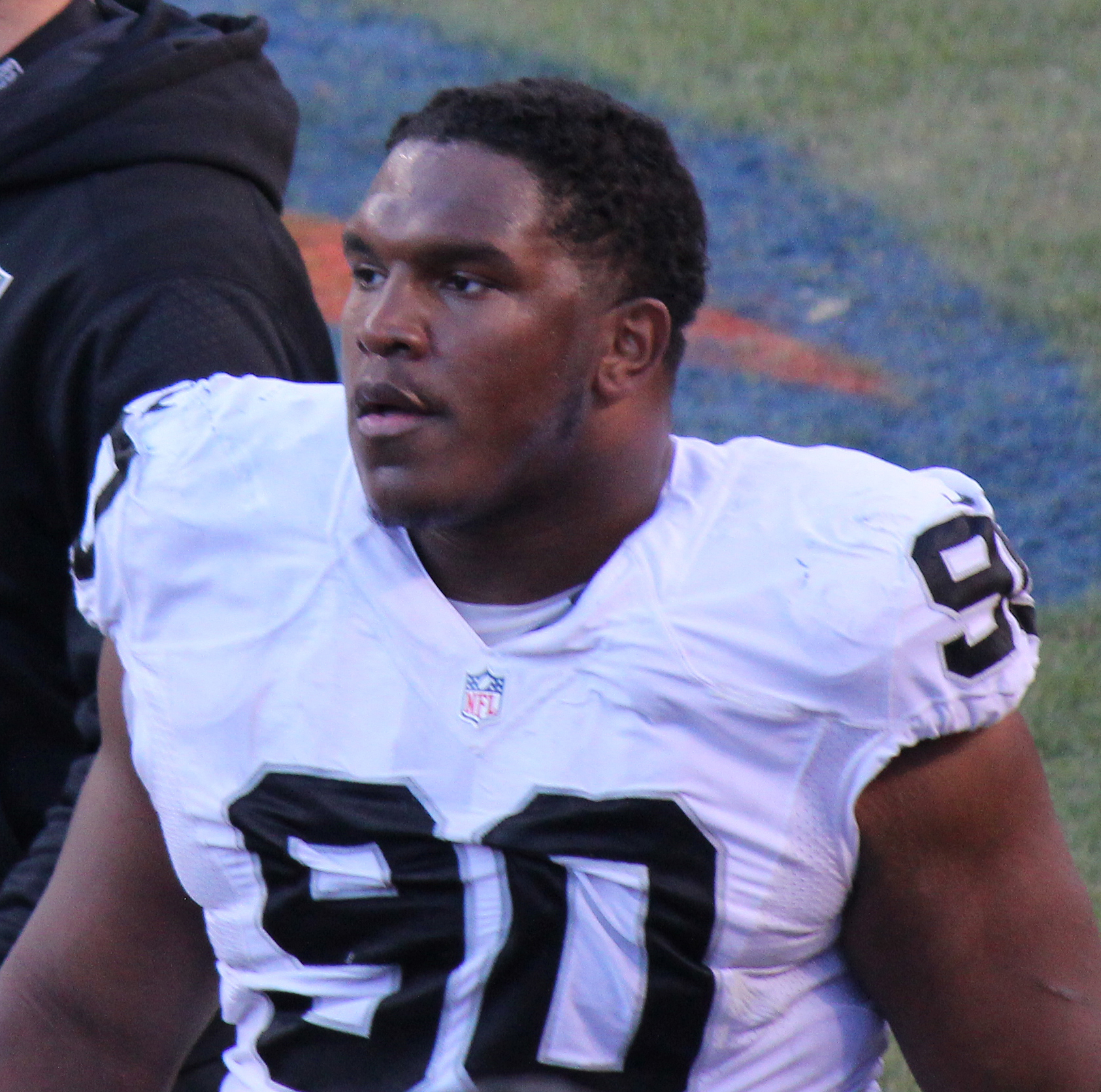
- Williams with the Oakland Raiders in 2015

No. 92, 90
- Position: Defensive tackle

Personal information
- Born: June 1, 1987 (age 39); Memphis, Tennessee, U.S.
- Listed height: 6 ft 2 in (1.88 m)
- Listed weight: 330 lb (150 kg)

Career information
- High school: East (Memphis)
- College: Tennessee (2005–2009)
- NFL draft: 2010: 1st round, 26th overall pick

Career history
- Arizona Cardinals (2010–2014); Oakland Raiders (2015–2016)

Awards and highlights
- Third-team All-American (2009); First-team All-SEC (2009)

Career NFL statistics
- Total tackles: 222
- Sacks: 3.5
- Fumble recoveries: 2
- Interceptions: 1
- Defensive touchdowns: 1
- Stats at Pro Football Reference

Daniel Ellis Williams (born June 1, 1987) is an American former professional football player who was a defensive tackle in the National Football League (NFL). He was selected by the Arizona Cardinals in the first round of the 2010 NFL draft. He played college football for the Tennessee Volunteers. He has also played for the Oakland Raiders.

== Early life ==
Williams attended Memphis East High School in Memphis, Tennessee. As a senior, he had 132 tackles, five sacks, four forced fumbles and two fumble recoveries.

Regarded as a three-star recruit by Rivals.com, Williams was ranked as the No. 35 defensive tackle in a class highlighted by DeMarcus Granger and Callahan Bright, and that also included Ndamukong Suh and Tyson Alualu.

== College career ==
Williams attended the University of Tennessee from 2005 to 2009. As a senior, he was a second-team All-SEC selection by the league's coaches after recording 62 tackles and two sacks.

== Professional career ==
=== Pre-draft ===
After a "tremendous" senior season, Williams was projected a first-round selection by Sports Illustrated. He was ranked the third best defensive tackle available in the 2010 NFL draft, behind only Ndamukong Suh and Gerald McCoy.

Pre-draft measurables
Height	Weight	Arm length	Hand span	40-yard dash	10-yard split	20-yard split	20-yard shuttle	Three-cone drill	Vertical jump	Broad jump	Bench press
6 ft 2 in (1.88 m)	327 lb (148 kg)	33 1/2 in (0.85 m)	10 1/8 in (0.26 m)	5.27 s	1.80 s	3.07 s	4.87 s	7.88 s	32.0 in (0.81 m)	8 ft 0 in (2.44 m)	27 reps
All values from NFL Combine

=== Arizona Cardinals ===
Williams was selected by the Arizona Cardinals in the first round with the 26th overall pick in the 2010 NFL draft. He signed a 5-year, $10.335 million contract on August 2, 2010. As a rookie Williams played in 15 games totaling 37 tackles and had two passes defended. In 2011, Williams was the starting Nose Tackle. In his first career start against Carolina, Williams led the defensive line with 4 solo tackles including 1 for a loss. On November 20, 2011, in the 4th quarter against San Francisco, Williams broke his arm and was placed on injured reserve ending his season. Williams finished the season playing in 10 games (starting all 10), totaling 20 tackles, and 2 passes defended. He appeared in 15 games with 11 starts in 2012 with 41 tackles on the season. On September 8, 2013, Williams intercepted a pass from Sam Bradford and returned it two yards for a touchdown. On September 21, 2013, his father died in a car accident, driving to New Orleans to see his son play. In the 2013 season, Williams finished with one sack, 23 total tackles, one interception, and three passes defended. In the 2014 season, Williams appeared in all 16 games and started nine. He finished with one sack, 32 total tackles, and one pass defended.

=== Oakland Raiders ===
On March 11, 2015, Williams signed with the Oakland Raiders. In the 2015 season, Williams finished with a half-sack, 48 total tackles, one pass defended, and one fumble recovery in 16 games and 15 starts.

In the 2016 season, Williams appeared in 16 games and started 11. He finished with 17 total tackles, one pass defended, and a half-sack.

On April 18, 2017, the Raiders released Williams.

=== NFL statistics ===
Year	Team	GP	COMB	TOTAL	AST	SACK	FF	FR	FR YDS	INT	IR YDS	AVG IR	LNG	TD	PD
2010	ARI	15	38	27	11	0.0	0	0	0	0	0	0	0	0	2
2011	ARI	10	20	14	6	0.0	0	0	0	0	0	0	0	0	2
2012	ARI	15	44	33	11	0.0	0	1	0	0	0	0	0	0	1
2013	ARI	14	23	15	8	1.0	0	0	0	1	2	2	2	1	2
2014	ARI	16	31	20	11	1.0	0	0	0	0	0	0	0	0	1
2015	OAK	16	48	33	15	1.0	0	0	0	0	0	0	0	0	1
2016	OAK	16	17	11	6	0.5	0	0	0	0	0	0	0	0	1
Career		102	221	153	68	3.5	0	1	0	1	2	2	2	1	10

== Personal life ==
Dan spends his offseason in Memphis, where he is a hands-on dad and husband to his eleven-year-old daughter, McKayla and his wife Tia. Off the field, Dan is committed to serving others, especially in the areas of education and health and wellness, specifically preventing diabetes in the African American community with his Filling the Gaps Foundation. He is also an ambassador for the American Diabetes Association and is a member of Team Tackle, work he dedicates to the memory of his late father who died in 2013.
