= Adena Halpern =

American author (born 1968)

- Born: December 8, 1968 (age 57); United States
- Education: Harriton High School; New York University (BFA); American Film Institute (MFA)
- Occupations: Author, writer
- Spouse: Jonathan Goldstein (m. 2007)
- Writing career
- Language: English
- Genres: Chick lit

Adena Halpern (born December 8, 1968) is an American author best known for her "chick lit" novels, "The Ten Best Days of My Life," "29" and "Pinch Me."

== Career ==
After graduating from Harriton High School outside Philadelphia, she attended New York University, graduating with a Bachelor of Fine Arts degree in dramatic writing. She then received her Master of Fine Arts degree from the American Film Institute in Los Angeles. In 2004, Halpern began writing a monthly column for Marie Claire Magazine titled "Haute Life." In 2007, she adapted her column into her first published book, Target Underwear and a Vera Wang Gown: Notes from a Single Girl's Closet. Target Underwear was a memoir. Halpern followed this with three novels, The Ten Best Days of My Life, 29 and Pinch Me, each of which followed a female protagonist coping with fantastical events.

Both The Ten Best Days of My Life and 29 have been optioned by 20th Century Fox for film adaptations. Amy Adams is attached to star in The Ten Best Days of My Life.

== Personal life ==
Halpern lives in Los Angeles with her husband, director and screenwriter Jonathan Goldstein whom she married in 2007.

== Bibliography ==
n°	Book Title	Year
1	Target Underwear and a Vera Wang Gown: Notes from a Single Girl's Closet	2007
2	The Ten Best Days of My Life	2008
3	29	2010
4	Pinch Me	2011
