= Jerrell Powe =

American football player (born 1987)

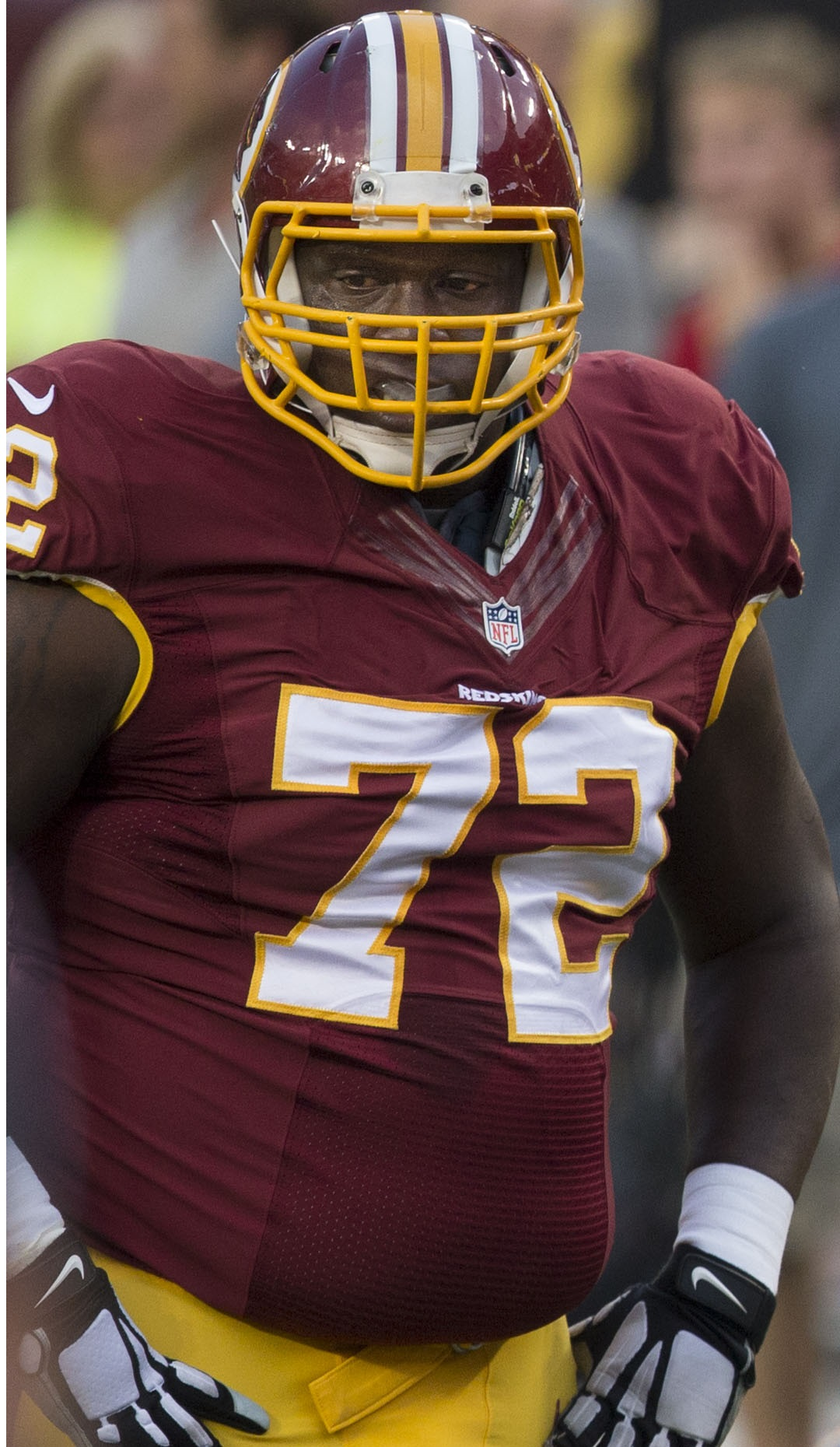
- Powe with the Washington Redskins in 2015

No. 95, 99
- Position: Nose tackle

Personal information
- Born: March 15, 1987 (age 39); Buckatunna, Mississippi, U.S.
- Listed height: 6 ft 2 in (1.88 m)
- Listed weight: 331 lb (150 kg)

Career information
- High school: Wayne County (Waynesboro, Mississippi)
- College: Ole Miss
- NFL draft: 2011: 6th round, 199th overall pick

Career history
- Kansas City Chiefs (2011–2013); Houston Texans (2014); Washington Redskins (2015),(2016)*
- * Offseason or practice squad member only

Awards and highlights
- 2× Second-team All-SEC (2009, 2010)

Career NFL statistics
- Total tackles: 18
- Sacks: 1
- Stats at Pro Football Reference

Jerrell Quartez Powe (born March 15, 1987) is an American former professional football player who was a nose tackle in the National Football League (NFL). He was selected by the Kansas City Chiefs in the sixth round of the 2011 NFL draft. He played college football for the Ole Miss Rebels.

== Early life ==
Powe attended Wayne County High School in Waynesboro, Mississippi, where he had 71 tackles and 14 sacks as a junior. As a senior, he was credited with 89 tackles, including nine QB sacks, while forcing five fumbles. Powe subsequently earned All-American honors by Parade and USA Today.

Considered a five-star recruit by Rivals.com, Powe was listed as the No. 3 defensive tackle prospect in the nation, behind DeMarcus Granger and Callahan Bright. He chose Ole Miss over Auburn, LSU, and Texas A&M.

== College career ==
Entering Ole Miss with a lot of hype, Powe was deemed a "potential freshman star" by some in the media. However, he had not completed the necessary 14 core courses in high school, and therefore was denied freshman eligibility. He spent a year at Hargrave Military Academy, a prep school in Virginia—where he was classmates with Vidal Hazelton, Keiland Williams, and fellow Ole Miss recruit John Jerry—, taking correspondence courses, but was again denied eligibility. The NCAA said at the time that Powe could either return to high school or go to a junior college.

Powe returned to Waynesboro to retake courses, attended Penn Foster Career School, a prep school in Scranton, Pennsylvania, and took correspondence courses in 2006. He returned to Ole Miss for the 2007 season, as the NCAA allowed him to practice for 14 days while it sorted out his status in August 2007, then again denied his quest to play for the Rebels. Powe attended Ole Miss in 2007–08 on financial aid but could not practice or participate.

Finally returning to the football field in 2008, Powe saw action in 12 games, missing only Arkansas, and earned his first letter. He totaled eight tackles with 3.5 tackles-for-a-loss and 1.5 quarterback sacks, while also recording an interception.

In 2009, Powe became a full-time starter for the Rebels and, according to Tony Pauline of Sports Illustrated, had NFL scouts "excited about his upside potential". He registered 34 tackles, including 12 TFLs, and 3 quarterback sacks. In his senior season, his numbers slightly dropped to 27 tackles (8.5 TFLs) and 2.5 sacks. He was awarded all-Conference Second-team honors after each year.

== Professional career ==
=== 2011 NFL draft ===
Coming into his final season Powe was rated as the top nose tackle prospect and drew comparisons to B. J. Raji, but he had a somewhat disappointing season and watched his stock slip. Graded as a second to third round talent, Powe fell in the 2011 NFL draft due to his relatively high age—24 years, 46 days on draft day. Powe was selected by the Kansas City Chiefs in the 6th round.

Pre-draft measurables
Height	Weight	Arm length	Hand span	Wingspan	40-yard dash	10-yard split	20-yard split	20-yard shuttle	Three-cone drill	Vertical jump	Broad jump	Bench press
6 ft 1 3/4 in (1.87 m)	335 lb (152 kg)	33 1/4 in (0.84 m)	9 5/8 in (0.24 m)	6 ft 6 3/4 in (2.00 m)	5.27 s	1.80 s	3.03 s	4.96 s	8.17 s	25.0 in (0.64 m)	7 ft 10 in (2.39 m)	27 reps
All values from NFL Combine/Pro Day

=== Kansas City Chiefs ===
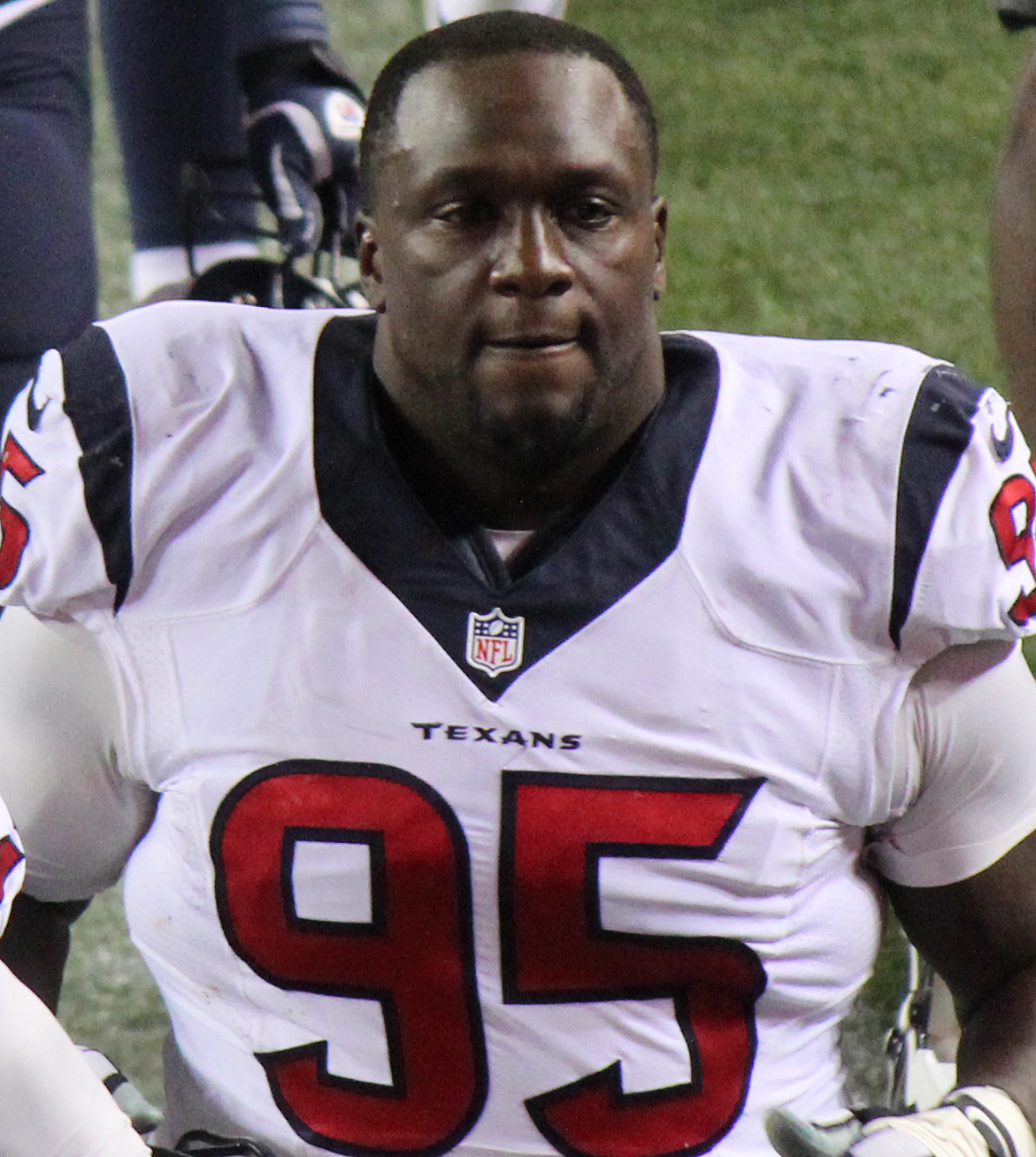
Powe with the Texans in 2014

In his rookie season, Powe was third on the depth chart at nose tackle, behind veteran Kelly Gregg and journeyman Amon Gordon. He made his NFL debut for the Chiefs in a loss against New England on November 21, 2011—his only game in 2011. In 2012, Powe competed with Anthony Toribio and rookie Dontari Poe to succeed the retiring Gregg at nose tackle, eventually losing out to Poe. Powe appeared only in nine games in 2012, seeing limited minutes as third-string back-up. The Chiefs waived him in the last round of final cuts on September 1, 2013. On December 3, 2013, Powe was signed by the Chiefs. On December 13, 2013, the Chiefs released Powe. Powe re-signed with the Chiefs on December 19, 2013.

=== Houston Texans ===
On March 18, 2014, Powe signed with the Houston Texans.

=== Washington Redskins ===
On June 1, 2015, Powe signed with the Washington Redskins. On September 5, Powe was released for final roster cuts before the start of the regular season.

Powe signed a futures contract with the team on January 4, 2016. The team released him on September 3, 2016.

== Legal troubles ==
On January 17, 2023, Powe was arrested and charged for kidnapping. A man from Laurel accused Powe and another man of abducting him and extorting him into withdrawing money from his bank account. In 2024 he was released after a grand jury declined to indict him for the charges.
