= Brandon Moore (offensive tackle) =

American football player (born 1970)

No. 70
- Position: Offensive tackle

Personal information
- Born: June 21, 1970 (age 56); Ardmore, Pennsylvania, U.S.
- Listed height: 6 ft 6 in (1.98 m)
- Listed weight: 295 lb (134 kg)

Career information
- High school: Archbishop John Carroll (Radnor, Pennsylvania)
- College: Duke
- NFL draft: 1993: undrafted

Career history
- Miami Dolphins (1993)*; New England Patriots (1993–1995); Arizona Cardinals (1995)
- * Offseason or practice squad member only

Career NFL statistics
- Games played: 26
- Stats at Pro Football Reference

Brandon Christopher Moore (born June 21, 1970) is an American former professional football player who was an offensive lineman for three seasons for the New England Patriots. He played college football for the Duke Blue Devils.
