= Lower Merion High School =

Coordinates: 40.0096°N 75.2800°W

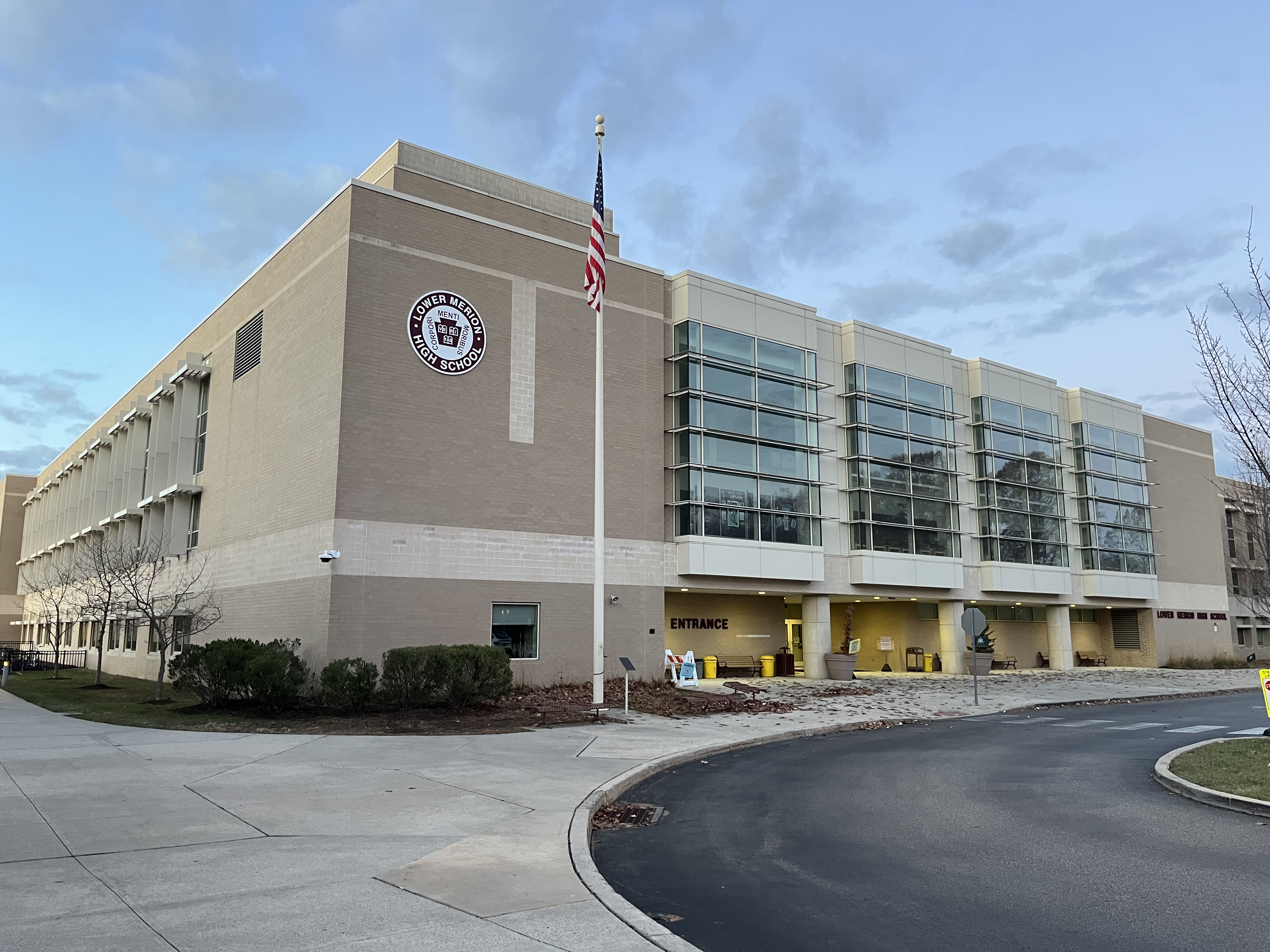
- Lower Merion High School in November 2024

Location
- 315 East Montgomery Avenue; Ardmore, Pennsylvania 19003; United States

Information
- Type: Public high school college preparatory
- Motto: Enter to Learn, Go Forth to Serve
- Established: 1894
- School district: Lower Merion School District
- Principal: Dr. Michael Johnson
- Teaching staff: 147.60 (FTE)
- Grades: 9–12
- Gender: Co-Educational
- Enrollment: 1,757 (2023–2024)
- Student to teacher ratio: 11.90
- Campus: Suburban
- Colors: Maroon and White
- Athletics conference: Pennsylvania Interscholastic Athletic Association (PIAA); Central Athletic League
- Mascot: bulldog
- Team name: Aces, Bulldogs
- Publication: The Merionite
- Website: www.lmsd.org/lower-merion

Lower Merion High School is a public high school in Ardmore, Pennsylvania, in the Main Line suburbs of Philadelphia. It is one of two high schools in the Lower Merion School District; the other one is Harriton High School. Lower Merion serves both Lower Merion Township and the Borough of Narberth.

In 2026, Niche.com ranked Lower Merion High School 7th among college preparatory public high schools and public high schools in Pennsylvania. U.S. News & World Report ranked Lower Merion High School and Harriton High School 11th and 12th in the state respectively. The school mascot is a bulldog, and its athletics teams are known as the "Aces”, honoring the U.S. Air Force Flying Aces established by Lower Merion alumnus Henry H. Arnold, an American general in both the U.S. Army and Air Force.

== History ==
=== 19th century ===
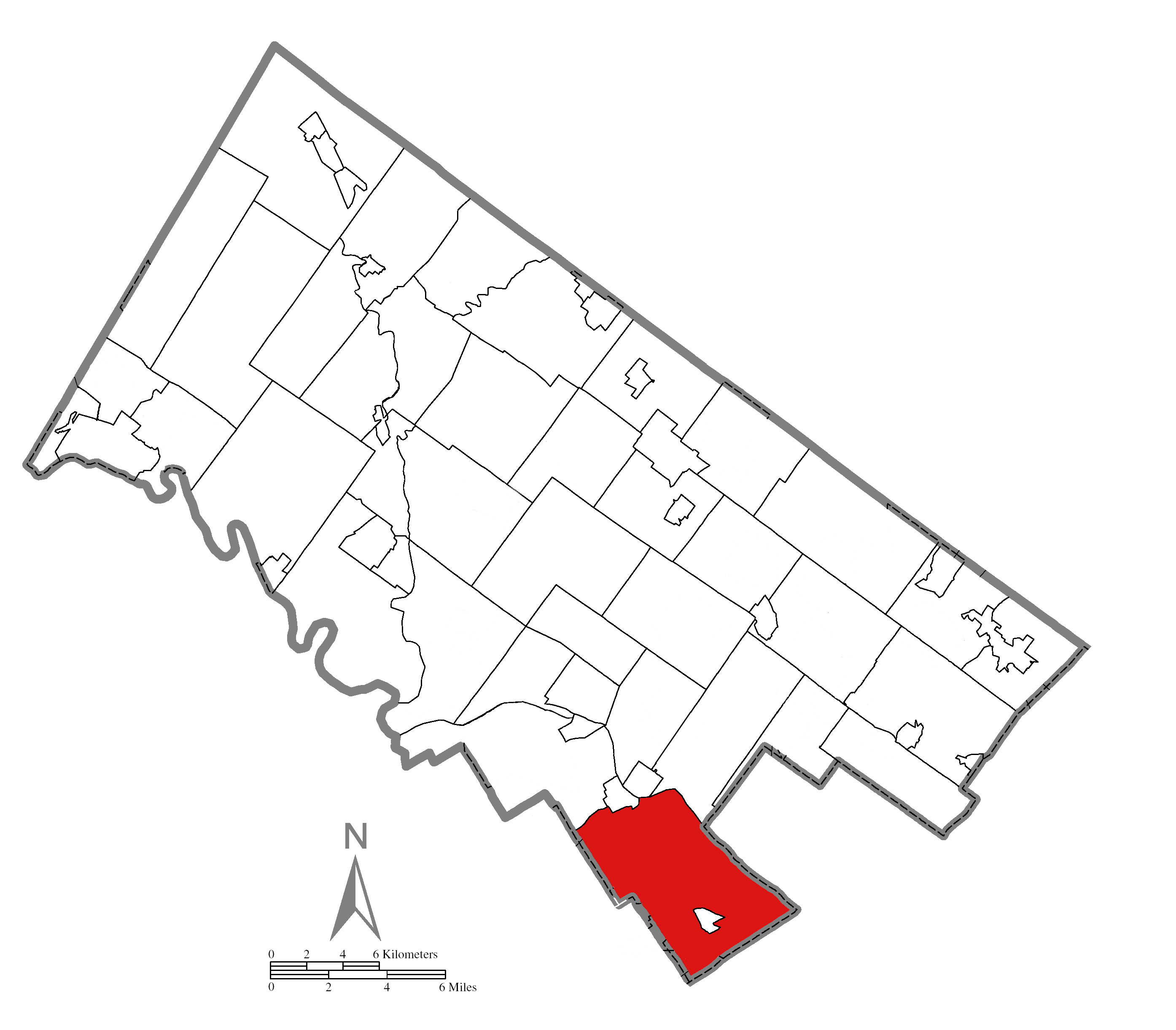
Lower Merion School District in Montgomery County, Pennsylvania

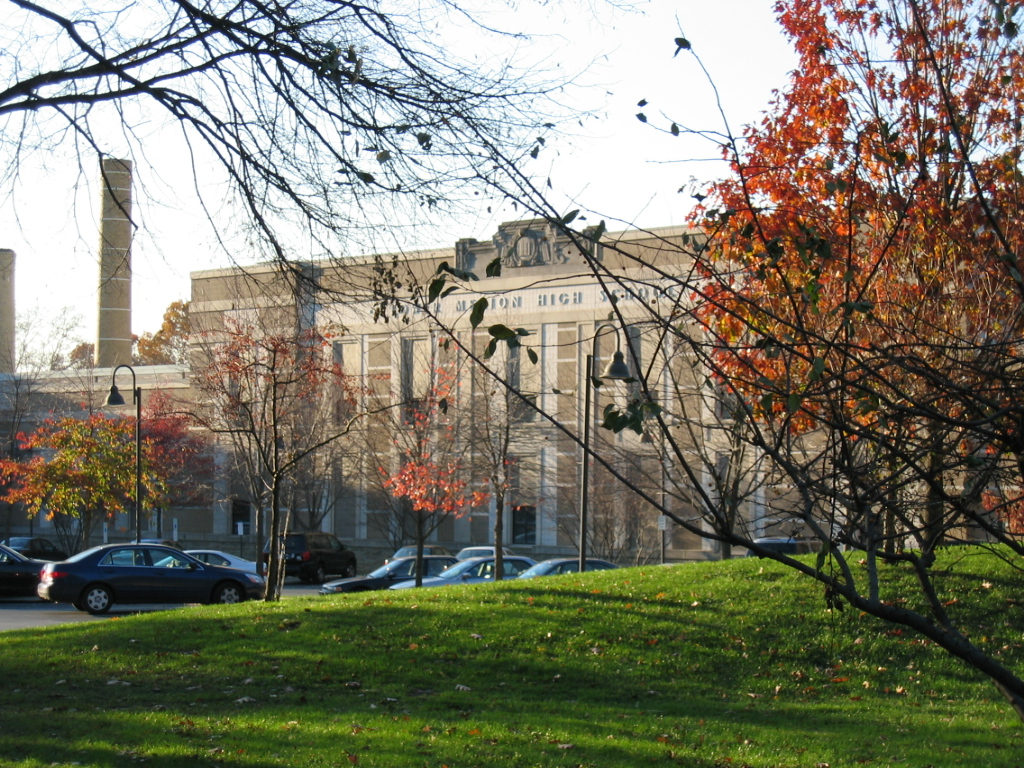
Lower Merion High School's old building

In 1894, with the consolidation of the area's three village high schools (Merion Square, Bryn Mawr, and Ardmore), Lower Merion began its first year in a stone building shared with the Ardmore Avenue Elementary School in Ardmore. In 1897, nine students participated in the school's first commencement ceremony. The original high school faculty had seven members, including the principal and superintendent. The curriculum offered only a two-year preparation for either college or industry.

=== 20th century ===
The Ardmore Avenue School burned in 1900 but was rebuilt, also of stone. In 1911, the high school moved out of the elementary school to new quarters, designed and constructed at the present site, 245 E. Montgomery Avenue. Dedicated on December 2, 1911, Lower Merion Senior High School was an impressive granite and stone edifice considered one of the finest new educational facilities in the state. The 17-acre (69,000 m^{2}) property, complete with three stone-arch entrances, landscaped grounds, and a football stadium, eventually grew to 23 acres (93,000 m^{2}) with the purchase and annexation of the Clarke House. At its opening, twenty-one staff members were employed under principal "Professor" Charles B. Pennypacker.

In 1922, Lower Merion Junior High School, later renamed Ardmore Junior High School, was constructed adjacent to the senior high school, and in 1926 two new wings were added on either side of the main high school building. These additions doubled the size of the original school, helping to accommodate rapidly increasing enrollment. The present administration building was constructed in 1932 to provide office space and an additional twenty-five classrooms. By 1940, the teaching staff had expanded to 61 under the direction of principal George H. Gilbert. Total student enrollment was 1461 for grades 10–12.

In 1943, an adjoining technical building was added along the School House Lane side to house shops for auto repair, metal, print, wood-working and drafting. In 1950, a cafeteria/library wing, designed by the Philadelphia firm of Savory, Scheetz and Gilmour, was added near Pennypacker athletic field. That same year the 18-acre (73,000 m^{2}) General Henry Harley "Hap" Arnold athletic fields opened directly across Montgomery Ave. By 1957, enrollment had grown to 1,663 students and the time had come to build a second high school (Harriton) in Lower Merion Township. The original 1910 building was demolished in 1963 and replaced by an air-conditioned classroom structure designed by H. A. Kuljian and Co.

Decreases in enrollment district-wide caused many Lower Merion elementary schools to close in the late 1970s along with Ardmore Junior High School. This move changed the remaining junior high schools to becoming middle schools (grades 6–8) and moved the ninth grade to the high schools. The Lower Merion High School graduation class of 1982 was the first freshman class at the high school including those students who four years earlier were members of the last graduating class of Ardmore Junior High School.

Due to later enrollment increases and to accommodate changing program needs, the district frequently reconfigured spaces in the facility, including re-opening classroom and storage space in the former Ardmore Junior High School in the 1990s. (Most of the junior high school had been demolished in 1992 to make way for additional parking). Rooms in the technical building were converted to other uses, including art classes, computer labs, and the school's television studio. Original classrooms were repurposed as spaces for individualized learning support and students with special needs.

=== 21st century ===
In 2004, the central lobby that connected the 1932 and 1963 structures was converted to a college-style help center.

Also in 2004, a community advisory committee determined that existing facilities no longer met the standards of the Lower Merion community and recommended that a new school, configured for 21st century education, be constructed on the same site. The Board and administration authorized construction of this new school in 2007. Demolition of the "Ardmore Annex", the natatorium, and one of the school's two gyms commenced in the summer of 2008 to make way for construction. The new Lower Merion High School opened in September 2010 and was dedicated in a public ceremony on October 17, 2010. In addition to state-of-the-art classrooms, science laboratories, art classrooms, and music rehearsal spaces, the new Lower Merion features a lecture hall with tiered seating, a multi-purpose black box theater, an 850-seat auditorium/theater, a greenhouse for environmental and horticultural studies, high-performance athletic facilities, a swimming pool, a television studio, multi-media production facilities, a music technology lab, an expansive courtyard, and a two-story, glass-encased library that serves as the building's exterior focal point along Montgomery Avenue.

The school also features a planetarium on top of the old building that closed after it was declared a fire hazard. It was then temporarily transformed into a staff lounge room. However, the room is currently vacated.

The new school was constructed adjacent to the historic district administration office (DAO) building, which is the only original structure that remains on the site. A number of measures were approved by the Lower Merion Historic Commission to ensure the school was designed to complement this Class I historic resource. The placement of the new building provides an unobstructed view of the DAO from Montgomery Avenue. The color and size of the masonry used in the new building is reflective of materials of the DAO.

On November 13, 2021, the school principal, Sean Hughes, was killed in a car crash while driving his teenage son to a soccer game.

== Athletics ==
Lower Merion High School competes in the Central League, part of Pennsylvania’s District I under the Pennsylvania Interscholastic Athletic Association (PIAA). The Central League expanded in 2008 to include Harriton and Garnet Valley, bringing the league to 12 member schools. Lower Merion athletic teams compete under two nicknames: the Bulldogs, used for football, girls ice hockey, and softball, and the Aces, used by all other sports.

Fall sports at Lower Merion include cheerleading, cross country, field hockey, football, golf, soccer, tennis, volleyball, and water polo. Winter sports include basketball, ice hockey, indoor track and field, squash, swimming, and wrestling. Spring sports include baseball, crew, lacrosse, softball, tennis, track and field, ultimate frisbee, and volleyball.

=== Varsity Basketball ===
The Lower Merion Aces boys basketball program is one of the most successful in Pennsylvania history. The team has won seven PIAA state championships, including AAA titles in 1933, 1941, 1942, and 1943, and AAAA titles in 1996, 2006, and 2013. The Aces were also state runners‑up in 2005 and 2012.

In 1996, future NBA star Kobe Bryant led the Aces to a 31–3 season and a state championship, marking the program’s first title in 50 years.

=== Cross Country ===
Lower Merion’s boys cross country program won three straight Central League championships and remained undefeated in league competition in 2025. Senior Nick Mazzeo won the New Balance National Cross Country Championship, becoming the first Lower Merion athlete and the only member of the Central League to win a national title in cross country.

=== Varsity Tennis ===
==== Boys Tennis ====
The Lower Merion boys tennis program remains one of the top in Pennsylvania. As of 2025, the Aces have won 11 PIAA AAA (3A) state championships in boys tennis, with team titles earned in 2006, 2007, 2015, 2016, 2017, 2021, and 2022. They also finished state runners‑up in 2024 and reached the state tournament in 2025, advancing into the later rounds of postseason play.

Individually, Lower Merion players have won state singles championships in 2003 and 2021, and state doubles championships in 2009 and 2021. The 2021 boys team made school history by winning the team, singles, and doubles state titles in a single year.

==== Girls' Tennis ====
The Lower Merion girls tennis team won back‑to‑back PIAA 3A state championships in 2024 and 2025, defeating top opponents such as Council Rock South and Conestoga in the state finals. The 2025 championship came with a 3–1 victory in the final match at the Hershey Racquet Club.

Several athletes from the 2024 and 2025 teams earned All‑District and All‑League honors, and a number of players went on to compete at the collegiate level.

=== Boys' Varsity Lacrosse ===
The Lower Merion boys varsity lacrosse program has won seven PIAA and Pennsylvania Scholastic state championships (1966, 1967, 1969, 1977, 1979, 1984, 1999), the most of any high school in the Commonwealth, and finished as state runners‑up in 1970, 1978, and 1980.

=== Volleyball ===
Lower Merion’s volleyball program has recorded several Central League playoff appearances and qualified for the District I tournament in the early 2020s.

=== Crew ===
The Lower Merion crew program competes at regional and national scholastic regattas.

== Laptop controversy ==
In the 2010 WebcamGate lawsuit, plaintiffs charged that Lower Merion School District (including Lower Merion High School and Harriton High School) secretly spied on students enrolled at the two high schools by surreptitiously and remotely activating webcams embedded in school-issued laptops the students were using at home, and therefore infringed on their privacy rights. The schools admitted to secretly snapping over 66,000 webshots and screenshots. Those included webcam shots of students in their bedrooms. In October 2010, the school district agreed to pay $610,000 to settle the Robbins and parallel Hasan lawsuits against it.

Two parents filed the lawsuit against the school district on February 11, 2010. The plaintiff was a student at one of the two district high schools. A federal judge issued a preliminary injunction ordering the district to stop its secret webcam monitoring, and ordered the district to pay the plaintiffs' attorney fees.

In July 2010, a Lower Merion High School student filed a parallel second suit. The school was also put on notice of a third parallel suit that a third student intended to bring, for "improper surveillance of the Lower Merion High School student on his school issued laptop", which included taking over 700 webcam shots and screenshots between December 2009 and February 2010.

A U.S. Senate Judiciary subcommittee held hearings on the issues raised by the schools' secret surveillance, and Senator Arlen Specter introduced draft legislation in the Senate to protect against it in the future. The Federal Bureau of Investigation (FBI), U.S. Attorney's Office, and Montgomery County School District attorney all initiated criminal investigations of the matter, which they combined and then closed because they did not find evidence "that would establish beyond a reasonable doubt that anyone involved had criminal intent". The civil lawsuit has a much lower burden of proof, and is unaffected by the decision. Lower Merion Police Superintendent Michael McGrath said: "This would appear to be a matter to be resolved in civil court." An investigative report prepared by the law firm Ballard Spahr–the firm that the Lower Merion School District had hired to defend it–did not find evidence that the system "was used to 'spy' on students", but was unable in many instances to find who had authorized that the system take surreptitious photographs, for what reason, and to find copies of photographs that had been deleted from the school server.

== Notable alumni ==
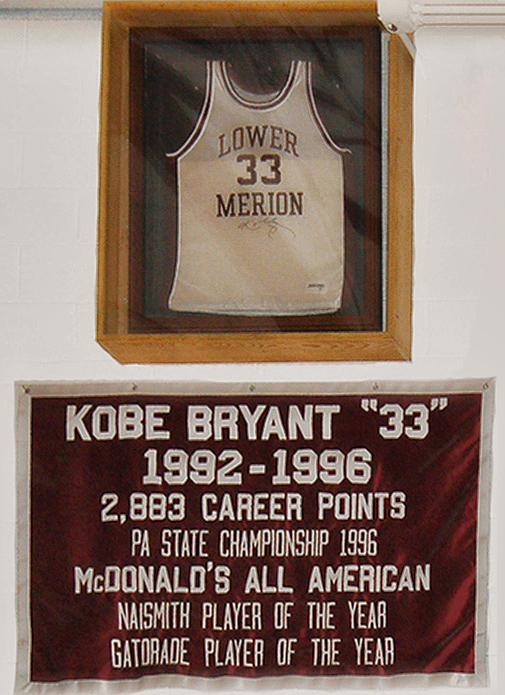
Kobe Bryant's retired #33 jersey and banner hang in the Lower Merion High School gym

Graduation year in parentheses.

- Kabir Akhtar (1992)
- Richard Amsel (1965) artist
- Henry H. Arnold (1903), general of the army and father of the U.S. Air Force; the only person to become a five-star general of two military branches (Army and Air Force); a founder of Project RAND, founder of Pan American World Airways
- Billy Aronson (1975), playwright, author, and originator of musical Rent
- Chuck Barris (1947), writer/producer, host of The Gong Show
- Julius W. Becton, Jr. (1944), Army general, director of Federal Emergency Management Agency (FEMA)
- Howard Benson (1974), music producer
- James H. Billington (1946), Librarian of Congress
- Al Bonniwell (1930), basketball player
- Jim Brogan (1976), NBA basketball player
- Kobe Bryant (1996), NBA basketball player
- Russell Carter (1980), All American at Southern Methodist University (1984), NFL player for New York Jets
- Johnny Christmas (2001), lacrosse player
- Joe Conwell (1979), USFL and NFL football player
- Tommy Conwell (1980), guitarist and lead singer for Tommy Conwell and the Young Rumblers
- Robert Fagles (1951), professor, poet best known for translating ancient Greek classics
- Bobbito Garcia (1984), DJ, writer
- Dylan Gelula (2012), actress
- Gideon Glick (2006), Broadway performer
- Alexander Haig (1942), United States Army general, 1973–74 White House Chief of Staff and 1981–82 Secretary of State
- Marshall Herskovitz (1969), television writer and screenwriter
- B.J. Johnson (2013), NBA basketball player
- Scott Barry Kaufman (1998), psychologist, author, and podcaster
- Mark Gerban (1998), represented the State of Palestine at the 2005 World Rowing Championships
- George G. Glenner, physician and Alzheimer's disease researcher
- Kylie Kelce (2010), podcaster and media personality
- Emily Kramer-Golinkoff (2003), founder of Emily's Entourage, a nonprofit organization dedicated to finding a cure for cystic fibrosis
- Howard Lassoff, 1955–2013, American-Israeli basketball player
- Noyes Leech (1939), 1921–2010, lawyer and academic
- Gerald M. Levin (1956), former chairman and CEO of Time Warner
- Rachel Levin (2014), YouTuber and beauty guru "RCLBeauty101"
- Aron Magner (1994), keyboard player for Disco Biscuits
- Lizzy McAlpine (2018), singer/songwriter featured on NPR's All Songs Considered
- Nancy Meyers (1967), Hollywood writer/director/producer
- Paul B. Moses (1947), art historian and educator
- J. Russell Peltz, Hall of Fame boxing promoter
- Bernard Pierce (did not graduate, transferred), NFL football player
- Robert Sataloff (1967), otolaryngologist, musician, and author
- Alec Scheiner (1988), president, Cleveland Browns of National Football League
- Lisa Scottoline (1973), attorney and novelist
- Lynn Sherr (1959), ABC News correspondent
- Neil Shubin (1978), palaeontologist
- Matt Snider (1994), NFL professional football player
- Jan Peter Toennies (1948), physicist, former director of Max Planck Institute for Dynamics and Self-Organization
- Ilya Zhitomirskiy (2007), founder of Diaspora software and website
