= Harriton High School =

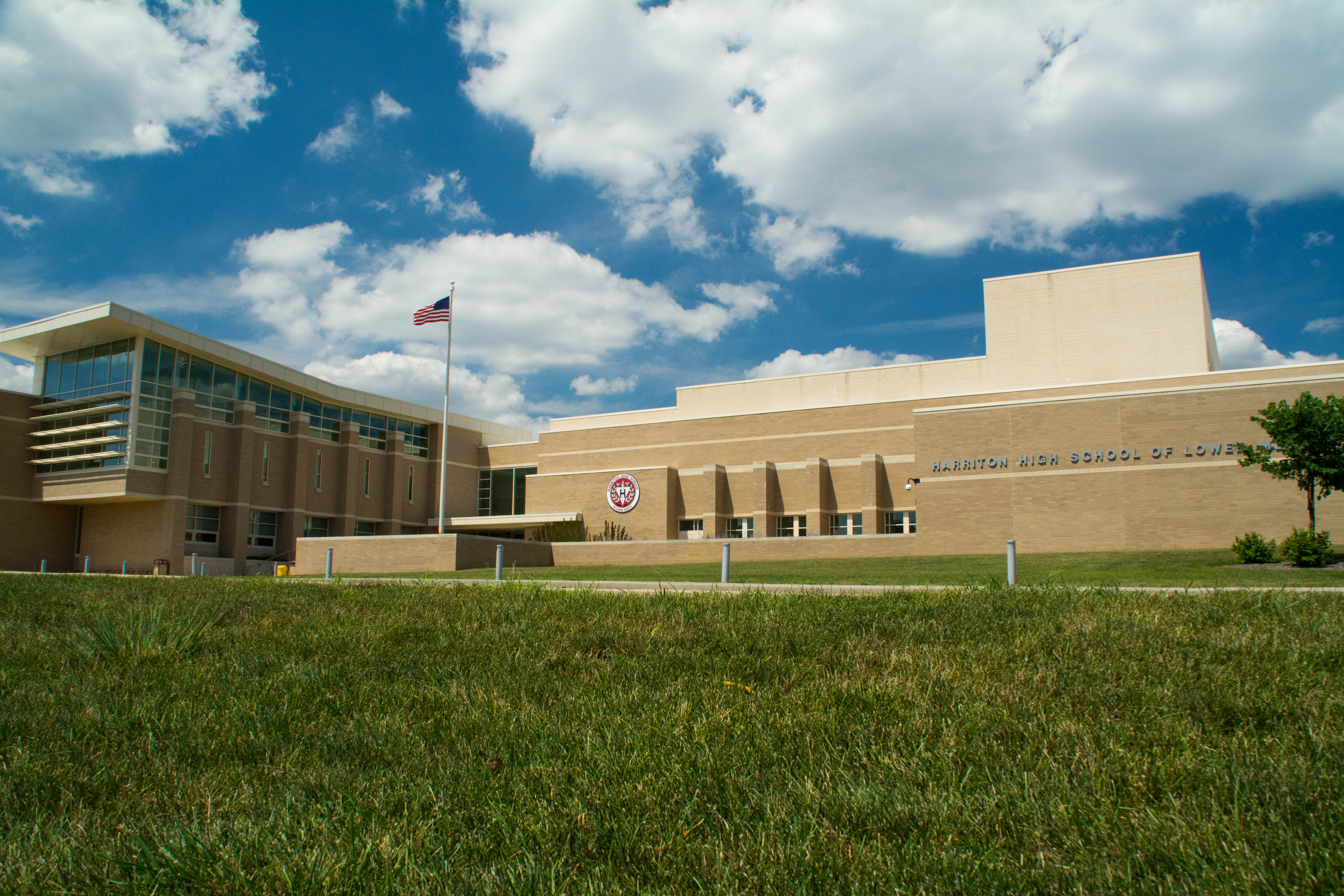
- Harriton High School in Rosemont, Pennsylvania

Location
- 600 North Ithan Avenue; Rosemont, Pennsylvania 19010; United States; 40°02′28″N 75°19′01″W

Information
- Type: High School
- Motto: "Carpe Diem"
- Established: 1958
- CEEB code: 394290
- Faculty: 118.05 (on an FTE basis)
- Enrollment: 1,206 (2023–24)
- Student to teacher ratio: 10.22
- Campus: 49.23 acres (199,200 m^{2})
- Colors: Red, White, and Black
- Nickname: Rams
- Publication: The Banner
- Website: www.lmsd.org/harritonhs/index.aspx?hhs

Harriton Senior High School, also known simply as Harriton High School, is a public secondary school in Rosemont, Pennsylvania, serving portions of Lower Merion Township, Pennsylvania. The school is located on the Philadelphia Main Line.

Harriton is one of two high schools in the Lower Merion School District, with the other being Lower Merion High School.

== History ==
Harriton High School is situated on a portion of the plantation grounds belonging to Charles Thomson, son-in-law of Richard and Hannah Harrison, giving Harriton High School its name. Thomson was secretary (1774–1789) of the Continental Congresses as well as the Convention to debate and negotiate the Constitution of the United States.

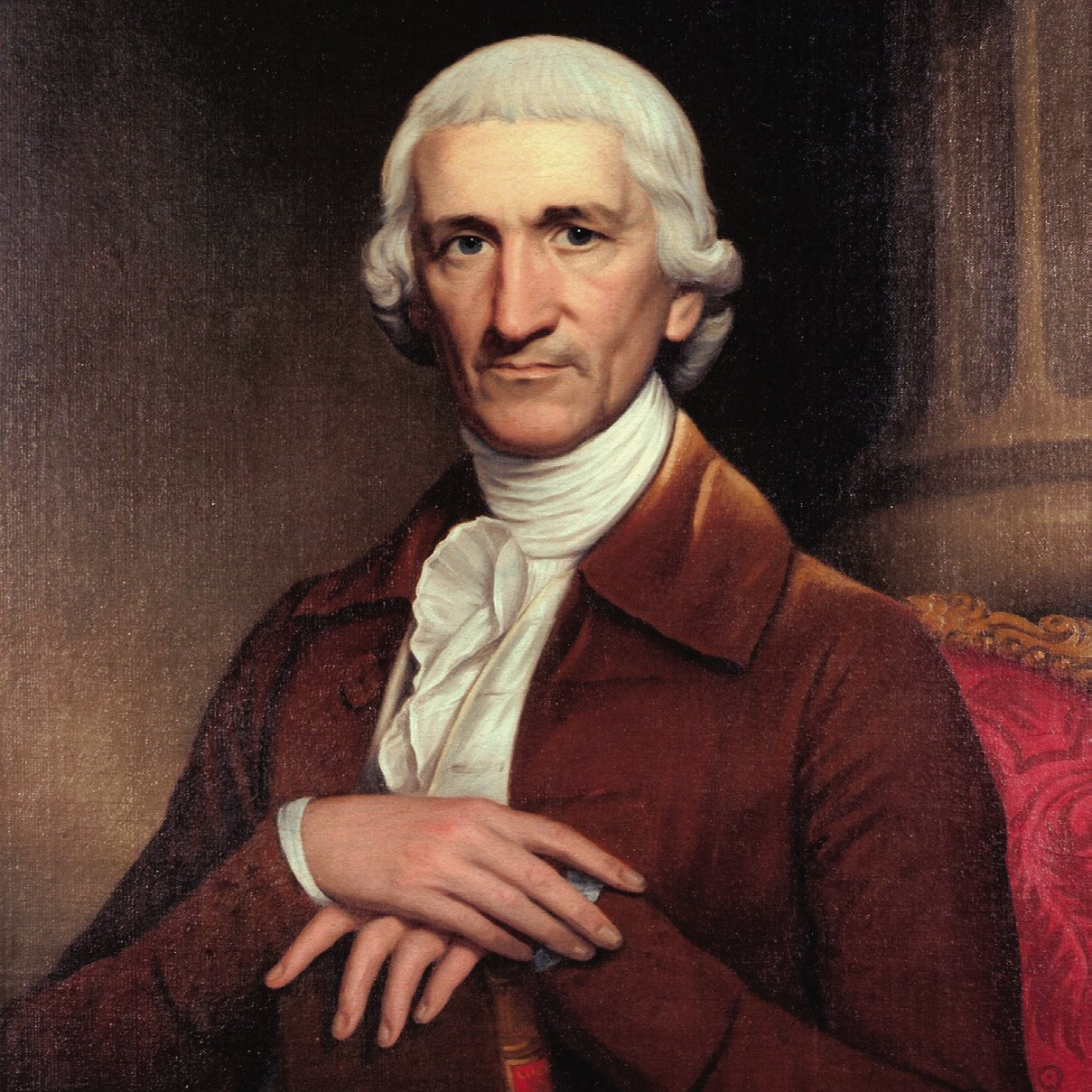
Charles Thomson (1729–1824), proprietor of Harriton House built in 1740s and on whose lands Harriton High School is sited. Thomson was secretary (1774–1789) of the first and second Continental Congress as well as convention to debate and negotiate the Constitution of the United States. As secretary, Thomson, a Founding Father of the United States, prepared the Journals of the Continental Congress. Thomson is also known for co-designing the Great Seal of the United States and adding its Latin mottoes Annuit cœptis and Novus ordo seclorum.

Harriton High School was designed in 1957 by architect Vincent Kling and opened in 1958. Kling's design consisted of five buildings connected by covered walkways otherwise open to the elements, a style unusual for the region (and that it shared with Welsh Valley Middle School, built at the same time). Kling intended to create a modern design that encompassed a simple and effective layout with a focus on natural light and an airy environment. Ironically, Harriton's 1958 campus buildings surrounded a mostly courtyard and was nicknamed "the Tombs" (despite the natural light and air).

By 2009, a new three-story building had replaced Kling's 1958 design, providing more sports and academic facilities to serve the growing student body.

== Clubs and activities ==
=== Harriton High School Television (HarritonTV/HHSTV) ===
Harriton High School is home to one of the lead news networks in the area, Harriton High School Television, also referred to as HHSTV or HarritonTV. HarritonTV is a student-run and organized news outlet based at Harriton High School. Founded in 2015 by Harriton alumnus Ricky Sayer, HarritonTV was established with the goal of creating an independent journalistic organization that encourages open dialogue and raises awareness of important school, local, and community issues. The network provides students with opportunities to develop skills in journalism, reporting, and media production while covering events and topics relevant to the Harriton community. HarritonTV produces news broadcasts and livestreams of many school events, serving as a source of information for students and the wider school community. The organization is operated by a student staff, allowing participants to gain hands-on experience in journalistic practices and digital media production.

=== Science Olympiad ===
Harriton hosts a successful Science Olympiad chapter. The team has placed among the top 10 at the Science Olympiad National Tournament for 21 consecutive years, winning three national championships and 16 consecutive state championships in that span.

Harriton competes in the Southeastern Region for Regionals and Pennsylvania for States. Although they have not run any invitationals in the past, Harriton participates in multiple invitationals, including Conestoga, Twin Tiers (Athens), Solon, Wright State, Massachusetts Institute of Technology (MIT), Cornell, UPenn and Princeton. In the states competition, Harriton held the longest winning streak of any Pennsylvanian team—athletic or not—placing first place at State for sixteen consecutive years (1997 to 2013). At the National competition, the team won the national title in 1995, 2001 and 2005.

Team Placements	Regionals	States	Nationals
2021	2	2	16
2019	2	1	3
2018	1	1	3
2017	1	1	2
2016	2	1	2
2015	1	1	8
2014	2	2	3
2013	1	1	2
2012	1	1	6
2011	1	1	8
2010	2	1	8

=== Academic Decathlon ===
Harriton High School features a chapter of the United States Academic Decathlon. The chapter participates in the Eastern Pennsylvania Regional Competition.

=== Music at Harriton ===
Harriton's music department features a full concert band, choir, orchestra, and performance jazz band. Every winter and spring, Harriton stages a music concert featuring all the ensembles, as well as an occasional string quartet and percussion ensemble.

Every year Harriton musicians audition for positions in the PMEA district band and/or orchestra.

=== Harriton Banner ===
The school newspaper had been called the Harriton Forum or the Harriton Free Forum since the opening of Harriton High School in 1957. In October 2006, it was renamed the Harriton Banner.

=== Technology Student Association (TSA) ===
Harriton TSA has had successes at regional, state, and national competitions, including a TSA national championship in Prepared Presentation in 2010. Harriton TSA members held five of the eight Pennsylvania TSA state officer positions. The four Lower Merion School District TSA chapters, including Harriton's TSA, consistently win more awards than any other school district in the Commonwealth of Pennsylvania.

Harriton TSA has held many dominant performances including chapter team getting first at states in 2023 and 2024.

=== Harriton Student Council (HSC) ===
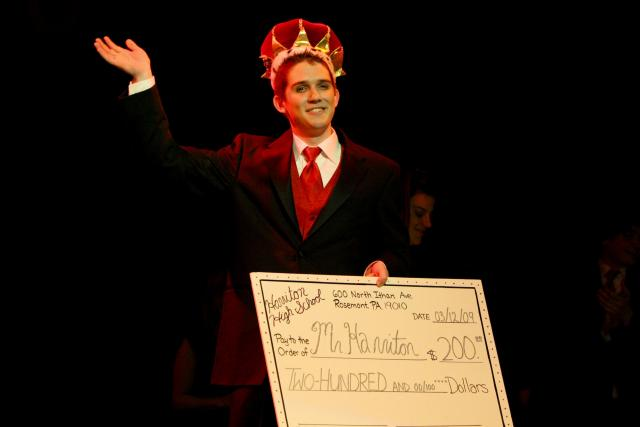
Mr. Harriton 2010, an event by the Student Council

HSC is the main body of representation for the Harriton student body and holds meetings that are open to any Harriton student. Members are divided into six committees: Students' Rights, Events, Communication, Finance, Planning, and Technology. There is a sub-committee under Students' Rights that was established after the district initiated the 1:1 laptop-to-student initiative (the Students' Rights Technology Sub-Committee). Council is the organizing and executing body of the annual "Mr. Harriton" competition, one of the flagship productions at Harriton High School. "Mr. Harriton" is a competition between male students engaging in a "beauty pageant" style competition. The event is held in a comedic spirit and raises money for charity. The Student Council collects revenue through ticket sales and catalog advertising. In 2014, the Student Council raised a record $17,000, all of which went to charity. In December 2018, the name of the event was changed to "Dr. Harriton" to reflect the fact that anyone may participate.

== Athletics ==
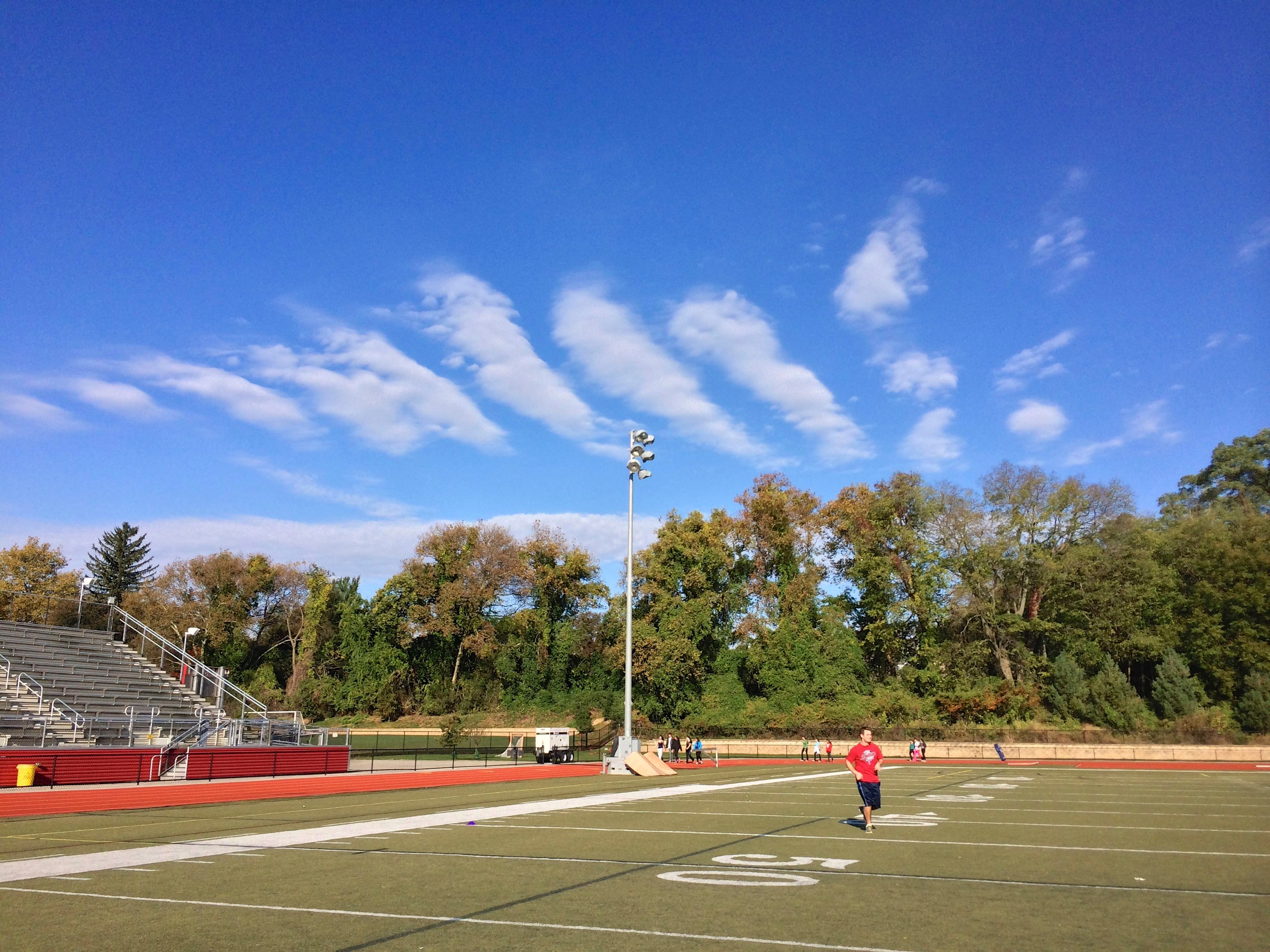
Harriton's football field

Harriton High School competes the Central League in District 1 of the Pennsylvania Interscholastic Athletic Association (PIAA). The schools has tennis, lacrosse, cross country, track and field, ice hockey, rowing, football, soccer, and swimming.

=== State titles ===
- Girls tennis PIAA Team Tennis Title 2004–2010. After moving up to Class AAA in 2012, girls tennis won the PIAA State Class AAA Team Tennis Titles in 2016, 2017, and 2019.
- Harriton's girls lacrosse won the PIAA State Championship in 2013 and 2019. Harriton's boys lacrosse won Pennsylvania State championships in 1970, 1971, and 1972 and came in second in 1974 and 1975.
- In the Spring of 2013, the Women's Varsity 4+ boat won the Scholastic National Championships, as well as made it to the final round of the Women's Henley Regatta in Henley-on-Thames, England. Both its girls' and boys' teams have won races in the all-city regatta. In 1976, Harriton's Varsity 4+ won the boys Stotesbury Regatta. In 1977, the boys Varsity 4+ won the Boys National Championship on Lake Carnegie in Princeton, NJ.
- The school has a boys and girls swim team. As of 2016, the boys teams had won 3 out of the last 5 state championships and the girls had won 2 out of the last 4.

== Laptop privacy lawsuit ==
In the 2010 WebcamGate case, plaintiffs charged Harriton High School and Lower Merion High School with secretly spying on students by remotely activating webcams embedded in school-issued laptops the students were using at home, thus infringing on their privacy rights. The schools admitted to secretly snapping over 66,000 webshots and screenshots, including webcam shots of students in their bedrooms. In October 2010, the school district agreed to pay $610,000 to settle two lawsuits related to privacy violations.

== Notable alumni ==
- Lynda Resnick (1960) – President/CEO Roll International Corporation.
- Mark Hallet (1961) - American neurologist and chief of the Human Motor Control Section and Medical Neurology branch at NIH
- Andy Hertzfeld (1971) – Personal computing pioneer, member of the original Apple Macintosh design team.
- Susan Kare (1971) – Graphic designer and originator of icons and typefaces for Apple Computer.
- Lawrence Summers (1972) – former president of Harvard University, former U. S. Secretary of the Treasury, and former director of the National Economic Council. (Summers returned to Harriton in 2009 to speak at the school's 50th commencement, and in 2015 to speak in the auditorium for the Stock Market Club.)
- Jordin Kare (1972) - physicist and aerospace engineer who researched laser propulsion, responsible for Mockingbird, and conceived the "SailBeam" interstellar propulsion technique
- Arn Tellem (1972) – Sports agent named "One of the 50 Most Influential People in Sports Business".
- David Crane (1975) – Emmy Award-winning TV writer/producer/director, creator of Friends.
- Kenneth Merz (1977) – American biochemist and molecular biologist currently the Joseph Zichis Chair and a Distinguished University Professor at Michigan State University.
- Adena Halpern (1987) – Author, The Ten Best Days of My Life (2008, Plume), 29 (2010, Touchstone), and Pinch Me (2011, Touchstone)
- Josh Becker (politician) (1987) – California State Senator
- John Wozniak (1988) – guitarist/singer Marcy Playground
- Katie Wright (1990) – actress, Melrose Place married to actor/director Hank Azaria since 2007
- Lou D'Angeli (1991) – performer & writer for Extreme Championship Wrestling and World Wrestling Entertainment & currently working for Cirque du Soleil in Las Vegas overseeing all marketing and PR.
- Josh Cooke (1998) – actor, notably Dexter, I Love You Man, and Curb Your Enthusiasm
- Wendell Holland (2002) - Winner of Survivor: Ghost Island and contestant on Survivor: Winners at War
- Eugene Bright (2003) – American football player
- Britt Reid (2003) - American football coach
- Callahan Bright (2005) – American football player
- Jack Kochanowicz (2019) - Professional baseball player for the Los Angeles Angels of Major League Baseball
