= Lower Merion School District =

School district in Pennsylvania

Address
- 301 East Montgomery Avenue Ardmore, Pennsylvania, 19003; United States

District information
- Type: Public
- Grades: K–12
- NCES District ID: 4214160

Students and staff
- Students: 8,467 (2021–2022)
- Teachers: 747.55 (on an FTE basis)
- Student–teacher ratio: 11.33

Other information
- Website: www.lmsd.org

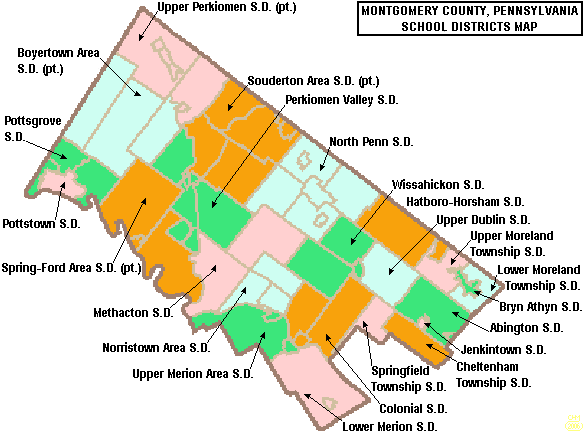
The public school districts of Montgomery County, Pennsylvania with Lower Merion School District in the southern corner of the county

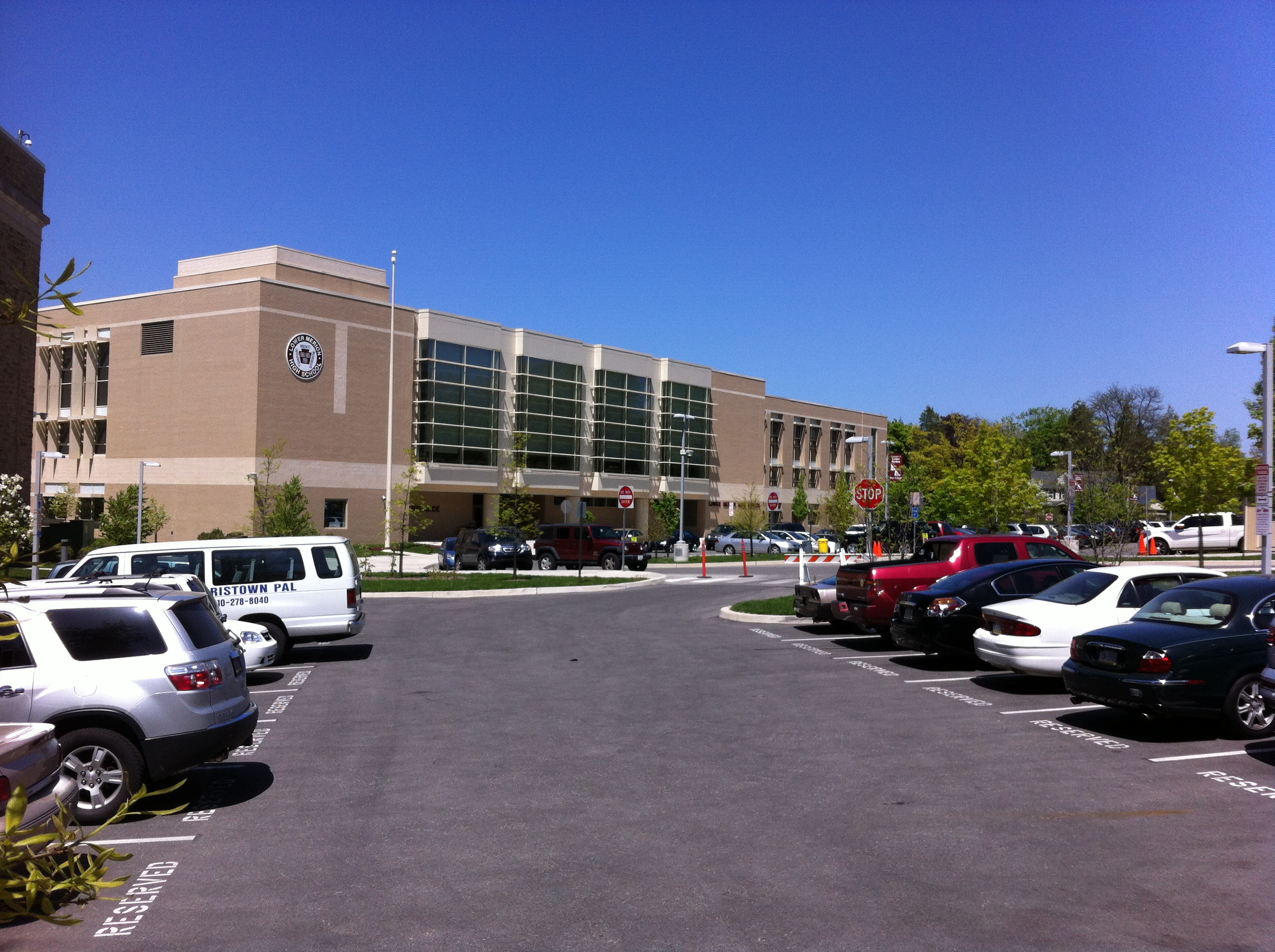
Lower Merion High School

Lower Merion School District, or LMSD, is a public school district located in Montgomery County, Pennsylvania. The school district includes residents of both Lower Merion Township and the Borough of Narberth. Established in 1836, LMSD is one of the oldest districts in Pennsylvania. It is the wealthiest school district in the state, and one of the wealthiest school districts in the country.

== Schools ==
=== High schools ===
- Lower Merion High School
- Harriton High School

=== Middle schools ===
- Bala Cynwyd Middle School
- Welsh Valley Middle School
- Black Rock Middle School

=== Elementary schools ===
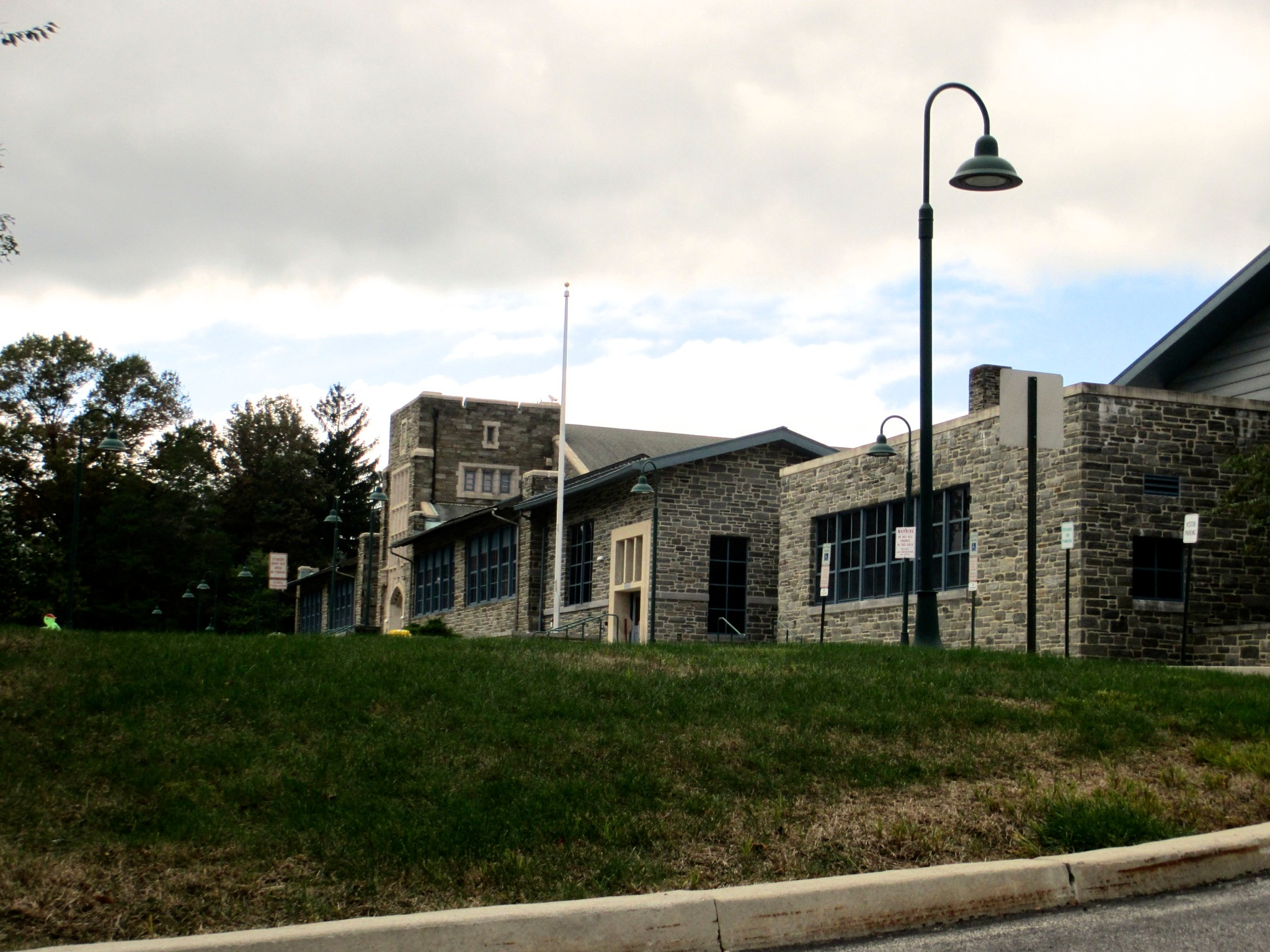
Merion Elementary School

- Belmont Hills Elementary School (originally the Ashland Avenue School)
  - Belmont Hills Elementary closed in 1981, but by 1996 the district considered reopening it or Narberth Elementary, though the district leadership was closer to supporting the reopening of Belmont Hills elementary, as reopening Narberth Elementary meant that LMSD would have had to reacquire the building, which it could not do in a manner the district leadership felt was timely. Belmont Hills Elementary closed in 1981, By 1998 the school district established a new attendance boundary for Belmont Hills Elementary, which included the northern part of Narberth, with that section taken from Cynwyd Elementary. This meant that students began to have longer times to travel to school. The organization "Parents Against Gerrymandering," made up of parents from the borough, sued the school district to try to stop the rezoning.
- Cynwyd Elementary School
  - Beginning in 1978, the school's attendance boundary included sections of Narberth borough, after the closure of Narberth Elementary, and prior to the reopening of Belmont Hills Elementary School.
- Gladwyne Elementary School
- Merion Elementary School
  - In 1966, students in South Narberth were reassigned to Merion Elementary School from Narberth Elementary, while the Merion Park community was rezoned from Merion Elementary to Narberth Elementary. In 1997, students in the South Narberth area were zoned to Merion Elementary, which was and is within walking distance.
- Penn Valley Elementary School
- Penn Wynne Elementary School.

== Former schools ==
Ardmore Avenue Elementary School, in the African-American section of Ardmore, had 80% of its students as African-Americans. The district closed the school in 1963 during the Civil Rights Movement. An LMSD website stated that the school had a building that was in a poor condition and that the dissolution of the school was "marking the beginning of the true desegregation at the primary level".

Ardmore Junior High School closed in 1978. It was on the property of the LMSD headquarters and Lower Merion High, with the building connected to both facilities. The school closed due to a vote by the LMSD board of trustees, seven in favor and two against. In 1966, Narberth residents were zoned to Ardmore Junior High School.

Bala Elementary School's second building opened in 1974, and the school closed in 1978. The second building had an open classroom plan. The school closed due to a vote by the LMSD board of trustees, seven in favor and two against. Lower Merion Township had partial ownership of the facility. Various private schools used the building after the closure of Bala Elementary.

In 1979 the district considered closing Bryn Mawr Elementary School, along with Belmont Hills Elementary.

Narberth Elementary School closed in 1978. The school closed due to a vote by the LMSD board of trustees, seven in favor and two against. The school district gave the school to the borough government, and an engineering company rented the building. The lease agreement had a stipulation in the event that LMSD needed additional school space. In 1996 the former school was still being used as an office facility. That year the district considered reopening it, but the district leadership was closer to supporting the reopening of Belmont Hills elementary, as reopening Narberth Elementary meant that LMSD would have had to reacquire the building, which it could not do in a manner the district leadership felt was timely. The district would not have been able to take control of the building until 1999. Of the possible choices of facilities to reopen, LMSD would have had to spend $11,100,000 on a reopened Narberth, making it the option where the district had to spend the most money. People living in Narberth did not significantly advocate for the reopening of Narberth Elementary.

Wynnewood Road Elementary School closed in 1978. The school closed due to a vote by the LMSD board of trustees, six in favor and three against.

== Laptop webcams lawsuit ==
In February 2010, a class action lawsuit was filed against the school district, alleging that Harriton High School had been secretly using remotely activated webcams built into laptops issued to their students to spy on the students in their homes, thereby infringing on their privacy rights. The webcam picture-snapping function was part of an anti-theft mechanism to help locate laptops that were reported by students as stolen. This function was activated by the school district on numerous occasions without adherence to the established guidelines. The lawsuit was filed by the parents of a student who had been warned by Lindy Matsko, an assistant principal, that he had been engaging in "improper behavior" in his bedroom. The schools admitted to snapping over 66,000 pictures and screenshots, including webcam shots of students in their bedrooms. However, no individuals were found guilty of spying.

== See also ==
- List of school districts in Pennsylvania
