= DeMarcus Granger =

American football player (born 1986)

No. 96
- Position: Defensive tackle

Personal information
- Born: September 4, 1986 (age 40); Dallas, Texas, U.S.
- Listed height: 6 ft 3 in (1.91 m)
- Listed weight: 320 lb (145 kg)

Career information
- High school: Justin F. Kimball (Dallas, Texas)
- College: Oklahoma
- NFL draft: 2010: undrafted

Career history
- Seattle Seahawks (2010)*; Iowa Barnstormers (2011); Omaha Nighthawks (2011)*
- * Offseason or practice squad member only
- Stats at ArenaFan.com

DeMarcus Granger (born September 4, 1986) is an American former football defensive tackle. After a heralded high school career, Granger's NFL prospects faded after an injury-plagued career at Oklahoma. He was not selected in the 2010 NFL draft.

== Early life ==
During his high school career, Granger was a standout defensive player at Kimball High School in the Dallas neighborhood of Oak Cliff. He was named Dallas Morning News Defensive Player of the Year in 2003 and 2004 and The Dallas Area Defensive Player of the Year as a junior. For his junior season, he recorded 68 tackles and 17 sacks. As a senior, he totaled 79 tackles, including 25 for loss, and 17 sacks and also forced 11 fumbles.

A consensus five-star recruit, Granger was ranked No. 1 among defensive tackles in the class of 2005, which also included Jerrell Powe, Ndamukong Suh, Dan Williams, and Tyson Alualu. Recruited by dozens of schools, he took official visits to Louisiana State, Arizona State, Oklahoma, Oklahoma State, and Tennessee. He committed to the Sooners on January 30, 2005.

== College career ==
After redshirting his initial year in Norman, Granger worked his way into the defensive lineman rotation as a redshirt freshman. As a sophomore, he played in 13 games and ranked third on the team with 8.5 tackles for loss, earning All-Big 12 second-team by the coaches and Rivals and honorable mention by the Associated Press. He was, however, suspended from the Fiesta Bowl after being arrested for shoplifting in the Arizona Mills mall in Tempe, Arizona, five days before the game.

In his junior season, Granger played in 11 games, missing two because of a foot injury suffered against Washington, and also the BCS championship game against Florida due to a back surgery. Recovering from this surgery, Granger missed all of the 2009 regular season, returning only to play the Sun Bowl versus Stanford.

== Professional career ==
On April 24, 2010, he was signed as an undrafted free agent by the Seattle Seahawks, but was waived on May 27, 2010.

== Personal ==
Granger was born to Debra Granger, a Mexican restaurant manager on September 4, 1986. He is cousin of Indiana Pacers NBA player Danny Granger.
