= Highland Arts Theatre Chime =

Coordinates: 46°8′19.6″N 60°11′38.4″W

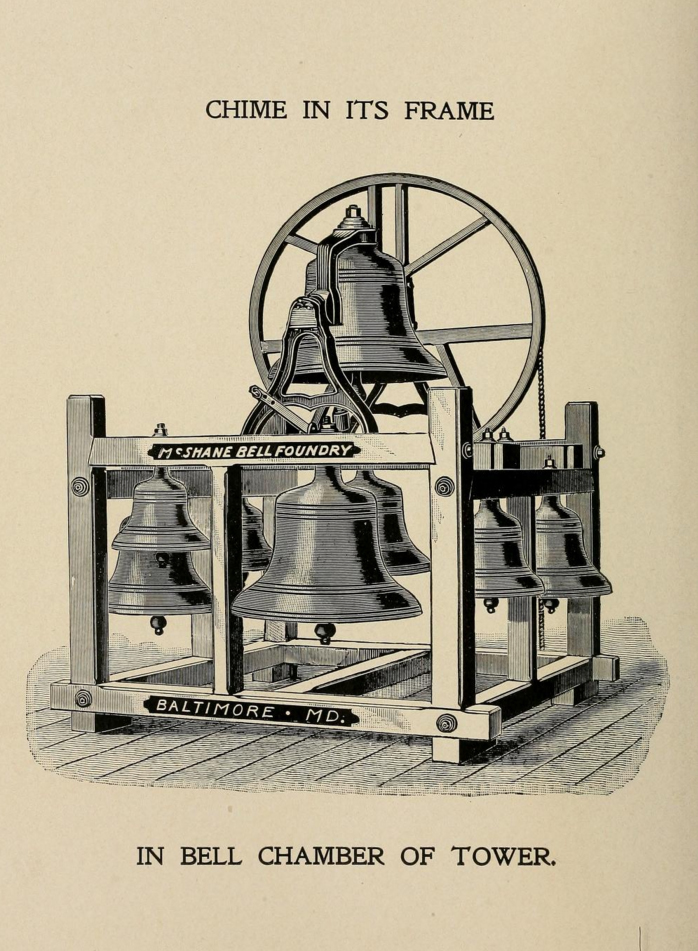
- This is the arrangement of a McShane Eight Bell Chime as it would appear in the Bell Chamber of a tower. This is very similar to layout of the Ten Bell Highland Arts Theatre Chime.

Percussion instrument
- Classification: Percussion
- Hornbostel–Sachs classification: 111.242.2 (Sets of bells or chimes)

Builders
- McShane Bell Foundry in Baltimore, Maryland

The Highland Arts Theatre Chime is a bell chime in the Highland Arts Theatre in Sydney, Cape Breton Regional Municipality, Nova Scotia, Canada. It consists of ten bells located in the south bell tower that are still in use today.

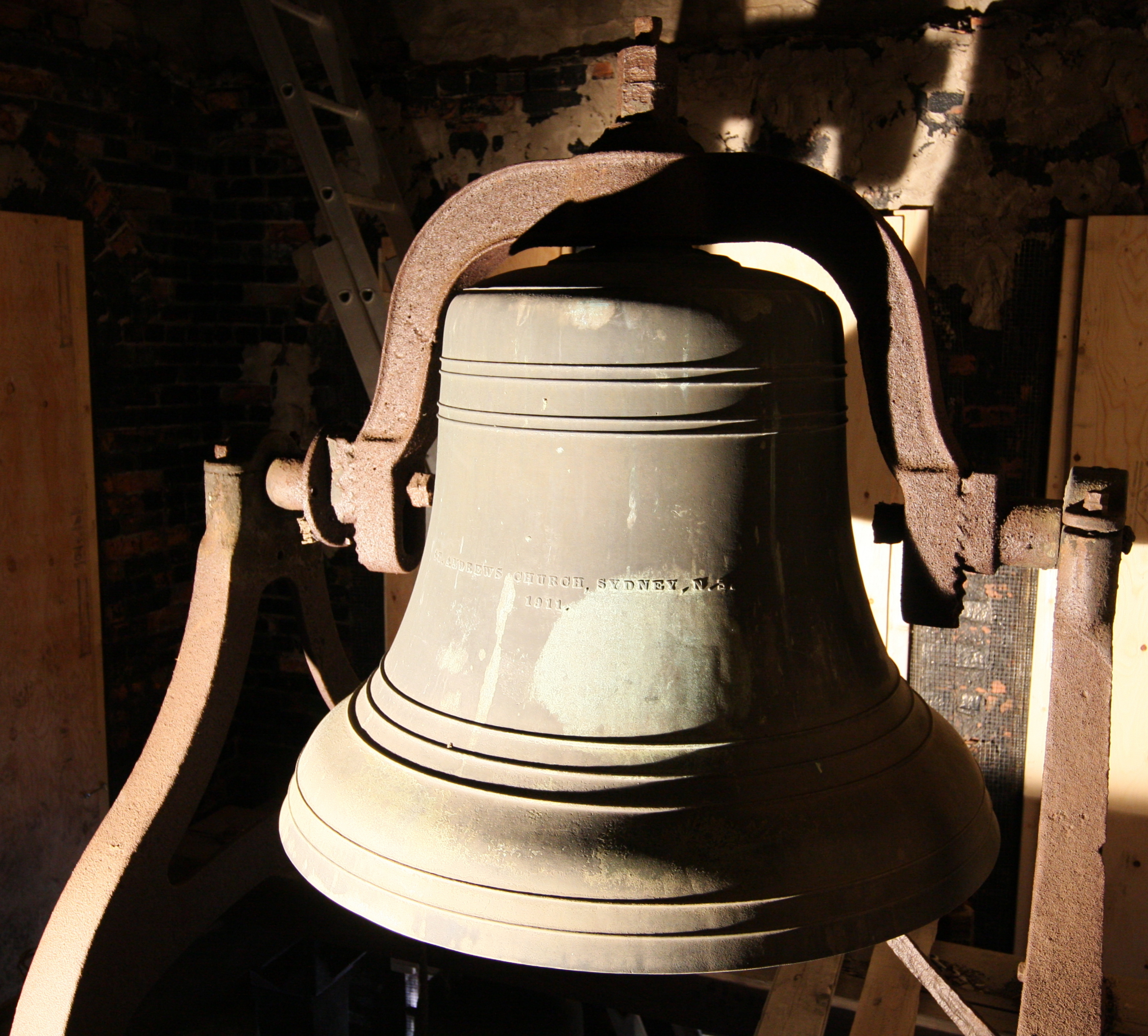
The bronze Tenor Bell in the Highland Arts Theatre Chime. This is the heaviest bell at 2,050 lb (930 kg) and is mounted in a rotary iron yoke on iron stands above the main chime frame in the bell chamber.

== History ==
Work was commenced on the new church building on Bentinck Street on April 14, 1910. The cornerstone was laid by Mrs. Farquharson, widow of the second minister, on the 29th day of June.

As the old church had only a bell, it was decided by the members, that they would like to have chimes in the new church, so on January 18, 1910, before the new building had been started, a number of young ladies of St. Andrew's met at the home of Mrs. A. N. Maclennan, for the purpose of organizing a sewing league to raise money for the chimes. The group was organized under the name of "The Chimes Club." The Club met every Tuesday evening, the dues were 10c per month.

The sum of $225.46 was raised by these ladies by the end of the first year, by a sale of hand work, and two socials, at which admission was charged. The contract price of the chimes was $3,500.00.

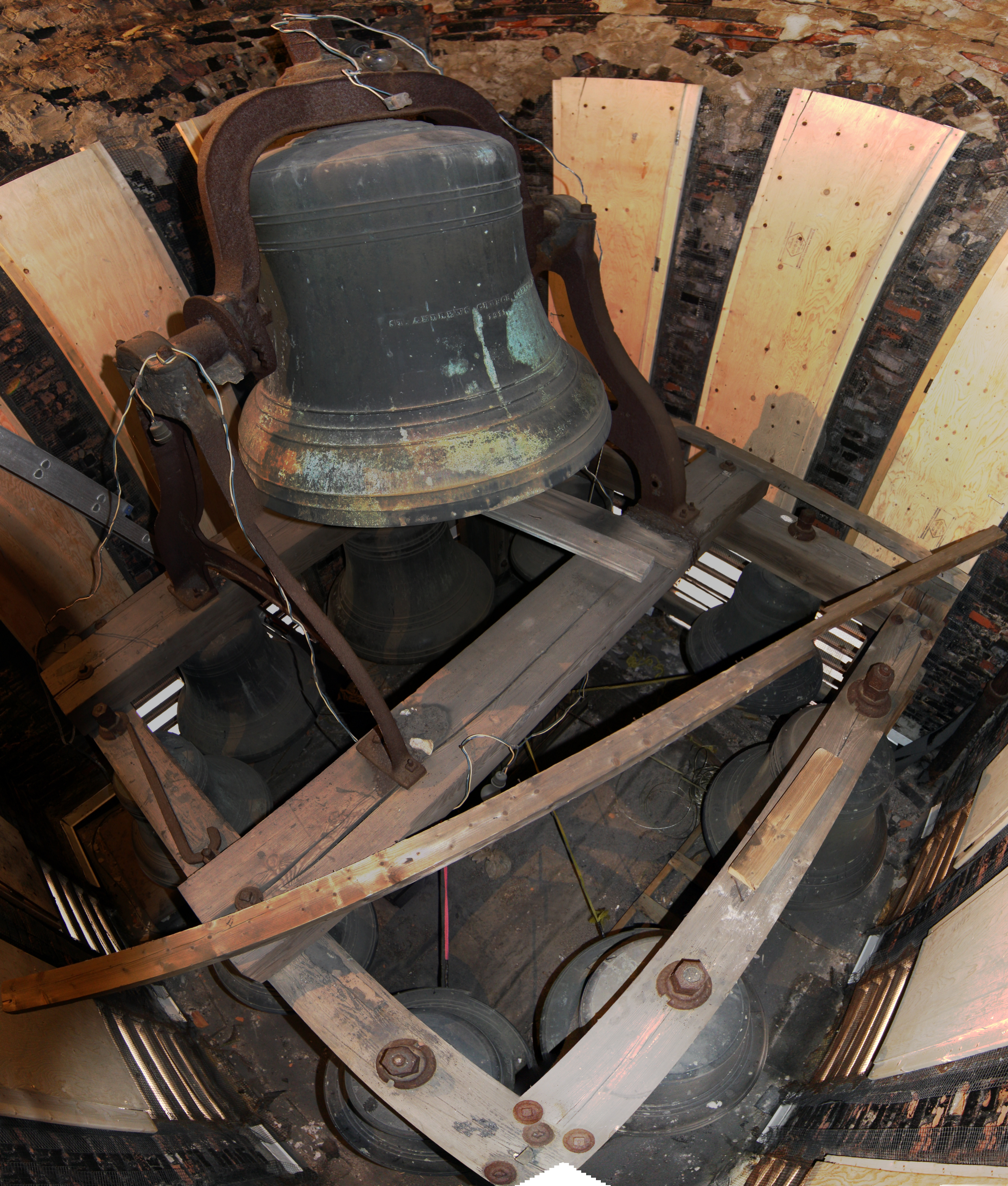
This is a wide angle image of the ten bells that make up the Highland Arts Theatre Chime. There is considerable distortion, especially of the Tenor Bell mounted on the top of the chimeframe, due to the wide angle nature of the photograph.

The bells were cast in bronze (bell metal) for St. Andrew's Church by the McShane Bell Foundry in Baltimore, Maryland, USA and are dated 1911. The chime first rang out in a series of concerts on June 24, 25, 26, 1911 in conjunction with the opening and dedication of the church itself. The special chimer for the occasion was Prof. J. W. Mettee, representing the founders - The McShane Bell Co.

== Characteristics ==
The bells are arranged as a traditional chime of 10 bells and are played from the ringing room immediately below the Bell Chamber in the bell tower using the original unmodified McShane "pump handle" chimestand with deep key-fall on all notes. The purely mechanical action makes it possible to play all dynamic gradations, from very soft to very loud. Nine of the bells are hung fixed in position in the main chime frame in the belfry, the tenth, the heaviest bell, is mounted in a rotary iron yoke on iron stands above the main chime frame. This bell, the tenor bell, is equipped with both a spring clapper and a tolling hammer so can be played either by swing chiming or by using the chimestand.

All the bells have the foundry's name cast onto their waist. The nine smaller bells are also decorated with inscriptions, quotes from Psalms from the King James Version of the Bible, cast onto their waist, while the largest bell's inscription reads "St. Andrews Church, Sydney NS". This largest bell weighs about 2,050 lb (930 kg) and its pitch is E in the middle octave. The chime is attuned to concert pitch, to the eight notes of the octave or diatonic scale with two bells added, one bell a semitone, a flat seventh, and one bell, the treble bell, above the octave. This smallest bell, at about 500 lb (230 kg), rings an F♯.

== Internet meme ==
In December 2015 a video posted on Facebook of Sydney native Glenda Watt playing the Christmas carol "Angels We Have Heard on High" on the chime was viewed more than 1.6 million times within the first nine days of it being uploaded to the social networking site.

Follow this link to a page of videos of the chime being played: The Chimes ~ Christmas Music

== The bells and their inscriptions ==
All bells are inscribed "MC SHANE BELL FOUNDRY CO., BALTIMORE, MD., 1911" on their waist.

| Bell | Inscription | King James Bible - Psalm and Verse | Musical Note | Weight |
|---|---|---|---|---|
| Large Bell - Tenor (Bass) | ST. ANDREWS CHURCH, SYDNEY, N.S. 1911 - | | E (middle octave) | 2,050 lb (930 kg) |
| 2nd Bell | LET THE CHILDREN OF ZION BE JOYFUL IN THEIR KING. | Psalms 149:2 - Let Israel rejoice in him that made him: let the children of Zion be joyful in their King. | F♯ | 1,500 lb (680 kg) |
| 3rd Bell | OH, COME LET US WORSHIP AND BOW DOWN. | Psalms 95:6 - O come, let us worship and bow down: let us kneel before the LORD our maker. | G♯ | 1,125 lb (510 kg) |
| 4th Bell | LET US KNEEL BEFORE THE LORD OUR MAKER. | Psalms 95:6 - O come, let us worship and bow down: let us kneel before the LORD our maker. | A | 925 lb (420 kg) |
| 5th Bell | HONOUR AND MAJESTY ARE BEFORE HIM. | Psalm 96:6 - Honour and majesty are before him: strength and beauty are in his sanctuary. | B | 725 lb (329 kg) |
| 6th Bell | STRENGTH AND BEAUTY ARE IN HIS SANCTUARY. | Psalm 96:6 - Honour and majesty are before him: strength and beauty are in his sanctuary. | C♯ | 650 lb (290 kg) |
| 7th Bell | SING UNTO THE LORD A NEW SONG | Psalm 96:1 - O sing unto the LORD a new song: sing unto the LORD, all the earth. | D | 600 lb (270 kg) |
| 8th Bell | SING FORTH THE HONOUR OF HIS NAME. | Psalms 66:2 - Sing forth the honour of his name: make his praise glorious. | D♯ | 575 lb (261 kg) |
| 9th Bell | MAKE HIS PRAISE GLORIOUS. | Psalms 66:2 - Sing forth the honour of his name: make his praise glorious. | E | 550 lb (250 kg) |
| 10th Bell - Treble Bell | PRAISE THY GOD, O ZION. | Psalms 147:12 - Praise the LORD, O Jerusalem; praise thy God, O Zion. | F♯ | 500 lb (230 kg) |

- Total weight of bells 9,200 lb (4,200 kg)

== Chimers ==
- Fred MacQuarrie
- James C. P. Fraser (later to become a minister)
- Percy Shaw
- James Menzies
- Dan Walker
- Fred Morrison
- Edwin Boutilier
- Cyril Everett
- John Campbell
- Clifford Boutilier
- Robert Crooks Jr.
- Ronald Crooks
- Robert Watt
- Donald Hill
- Lourie Hill
- Grant Kerr
- Sandy MacDonald
- Glenda Watt since 2013

== Gallery ==
Highland Arts Theatre McShane Ten Bell Chime
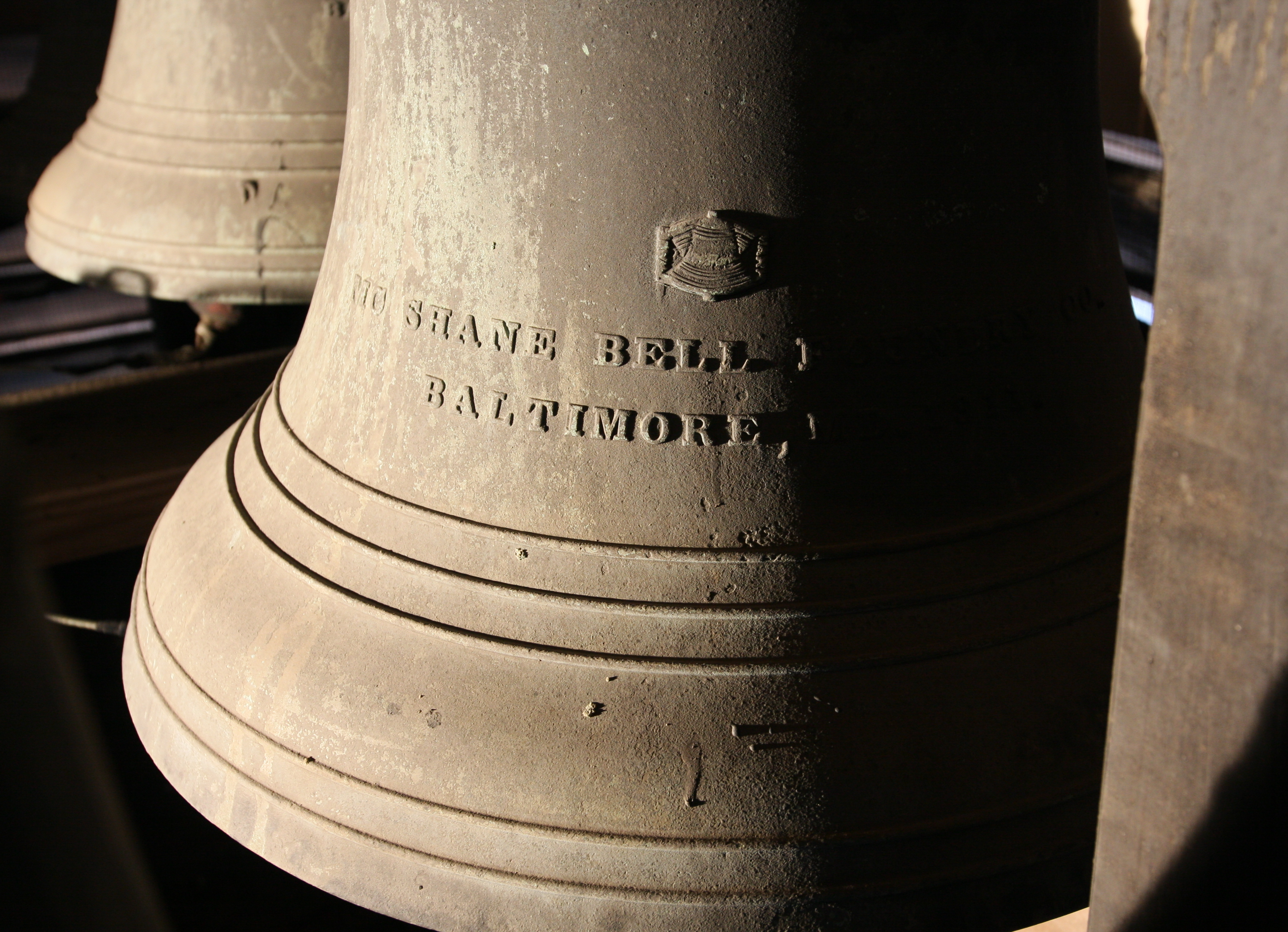
This is the 8th Bell in the Chime, showing the inscription "MC SHANE BELL FOUNDRY CO., BALTIMORE, MD., 1911" on its waist. This bell weighs 575 lb (261 kg).

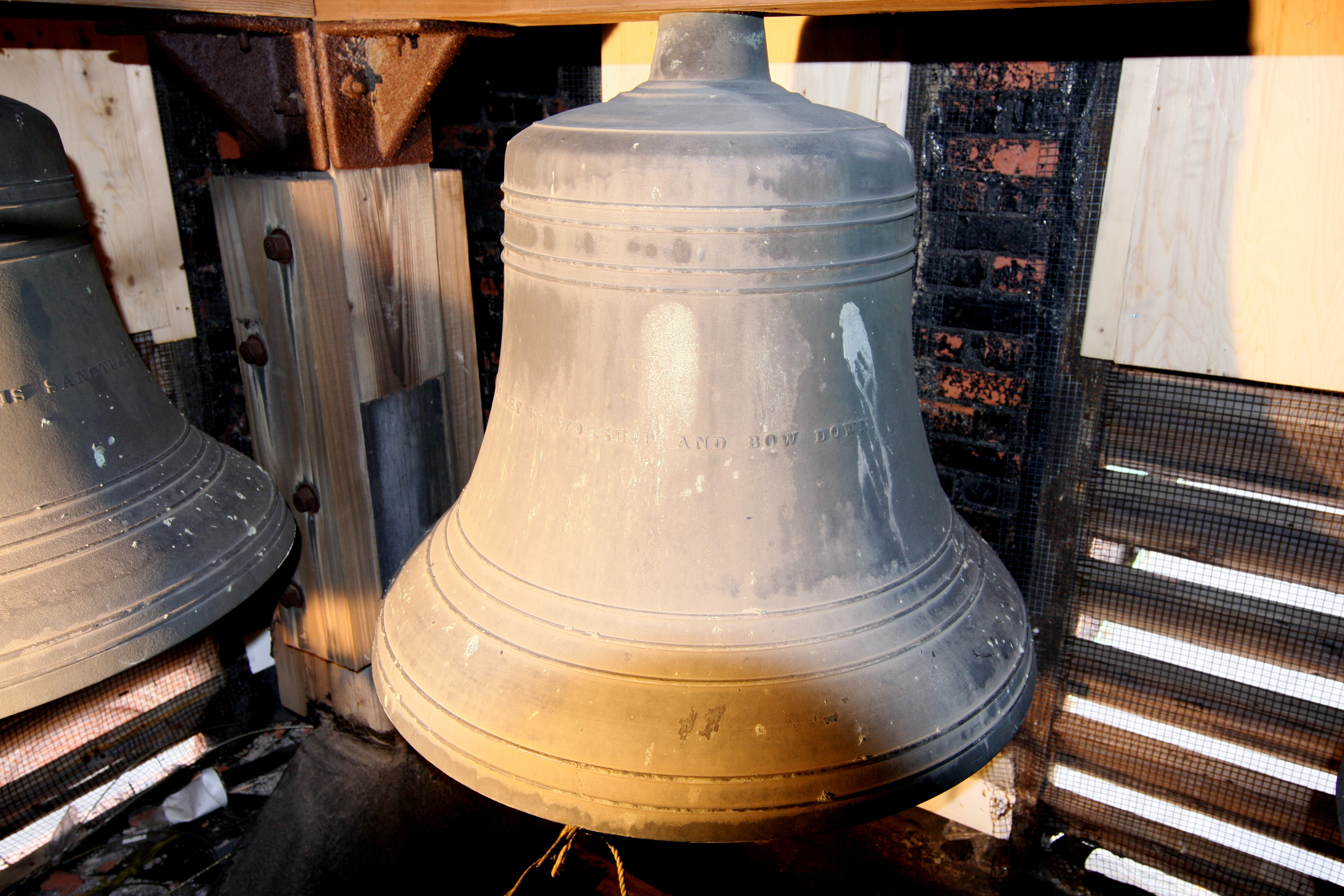
The 3rd Bell in the Chime, showing the inscription "OH, COME LET US WORSHIP AND BOW DOWN." from Psalm 95. This bell rings a G♯ and weighs 1,125 lb (510 kg).

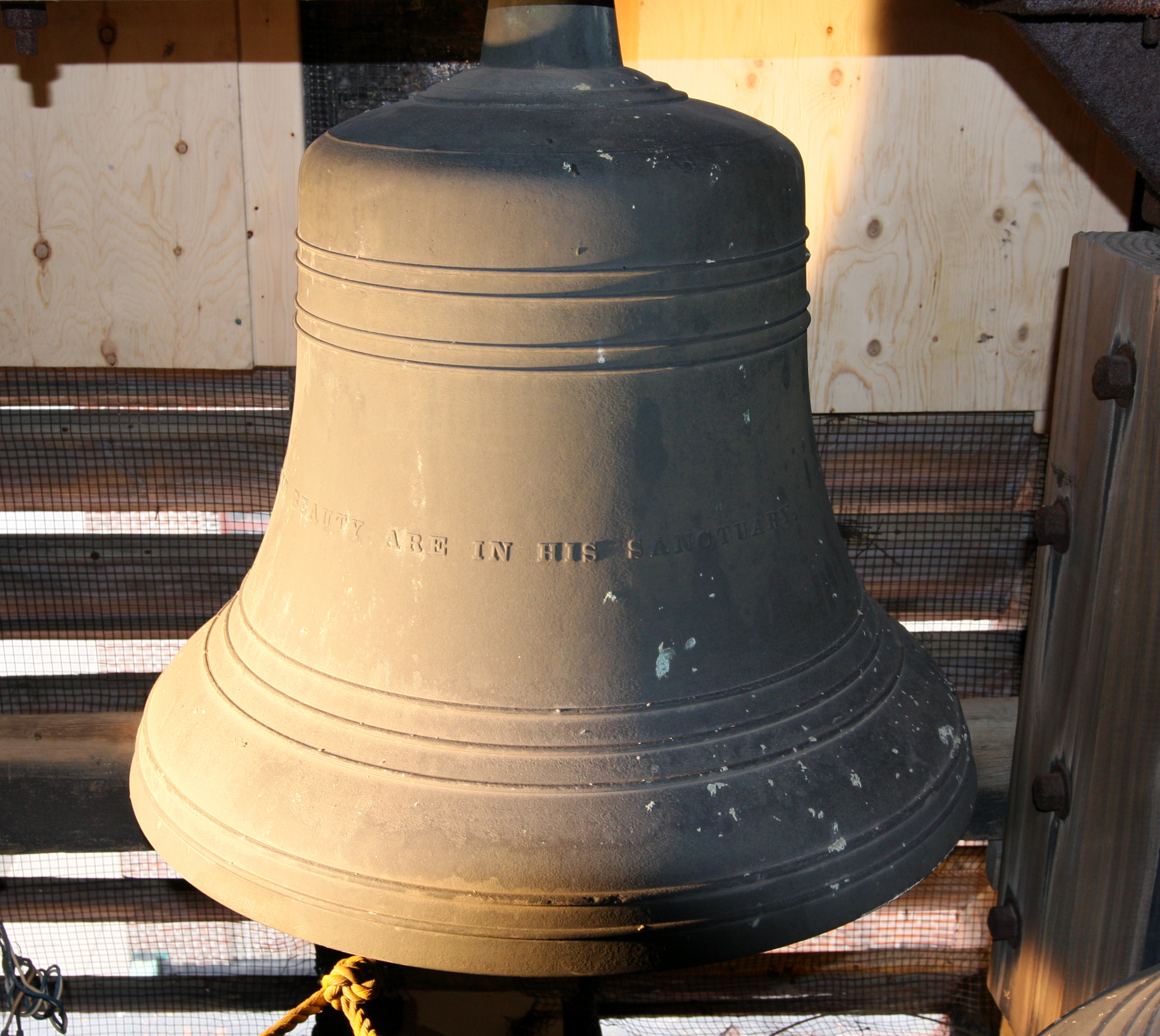
The 6th Bell in the Chime, showing the inscription "STRENGTH AND BEAUTY ARE IN HIS SANCTUARY." from Psalm 96. This bell rings a C♯ and weighs 650 lb (290 kg).

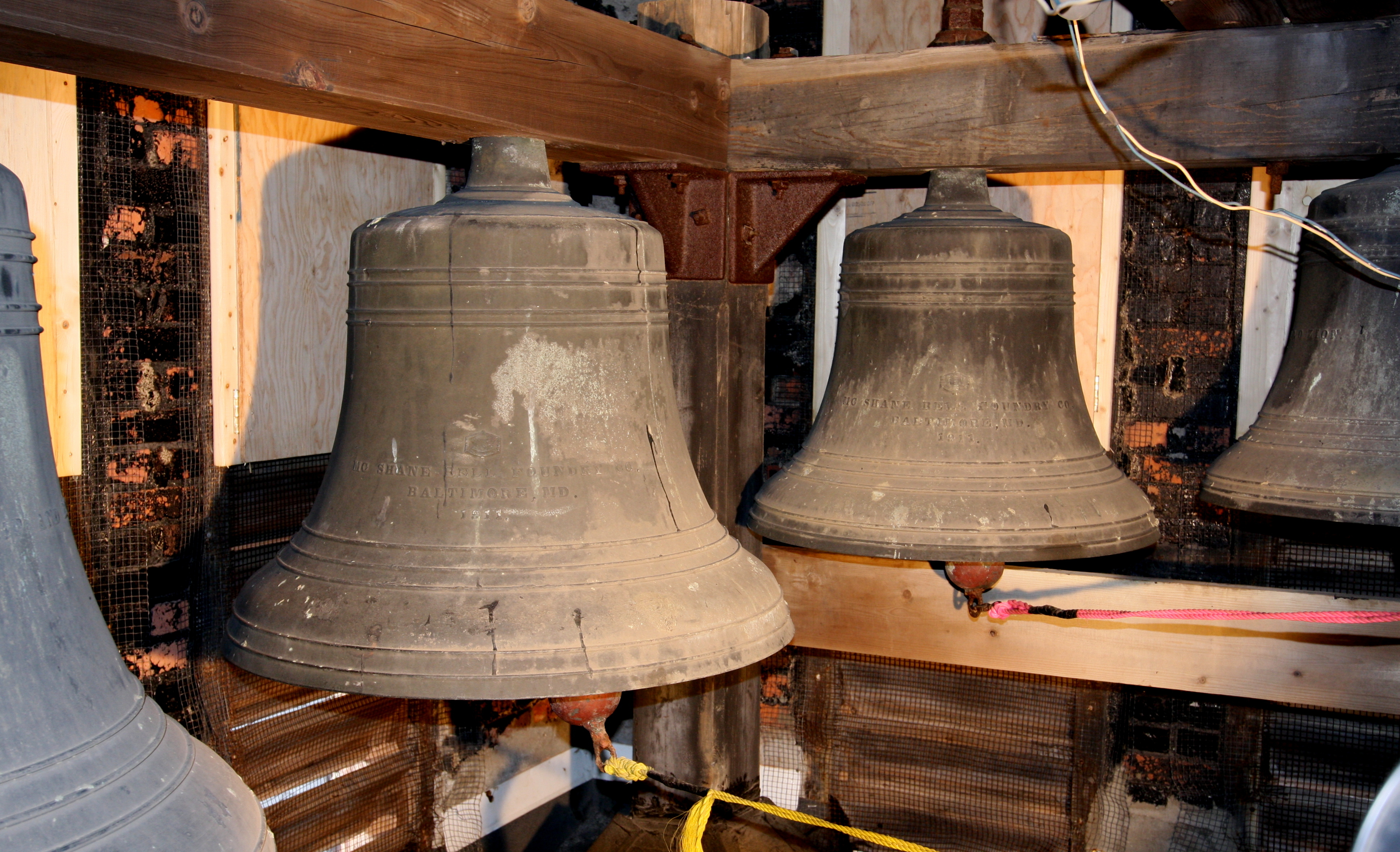
These are the 7th and 3rd Bells in the Chime, showing the inscription "MC SHANE BELL FOUNDRY CO., BALTIMORE, MD., 1911" on their waist.

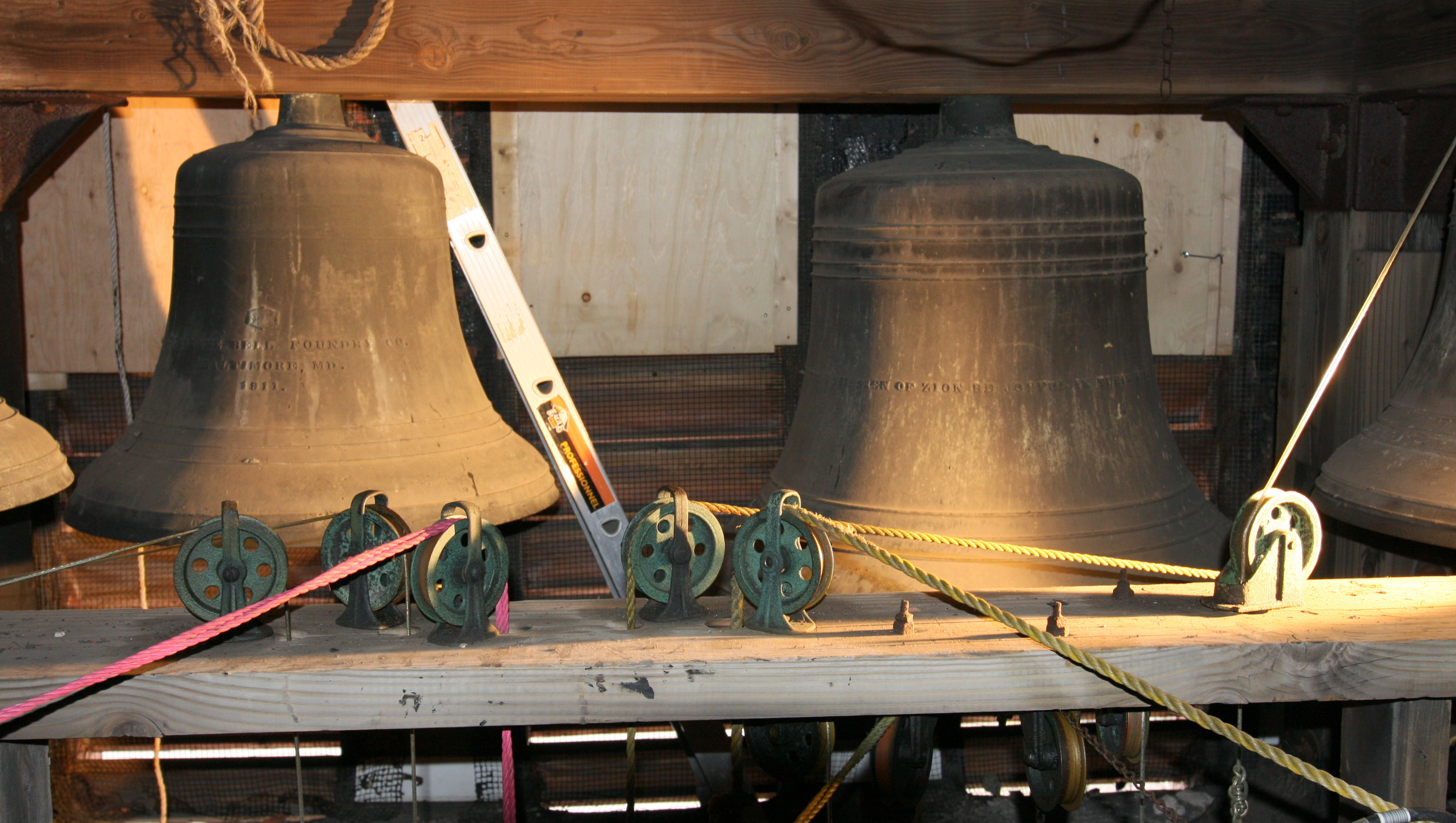
This is an image of the 6th and 9th Bells in the Highland Arts Theatre Chime.

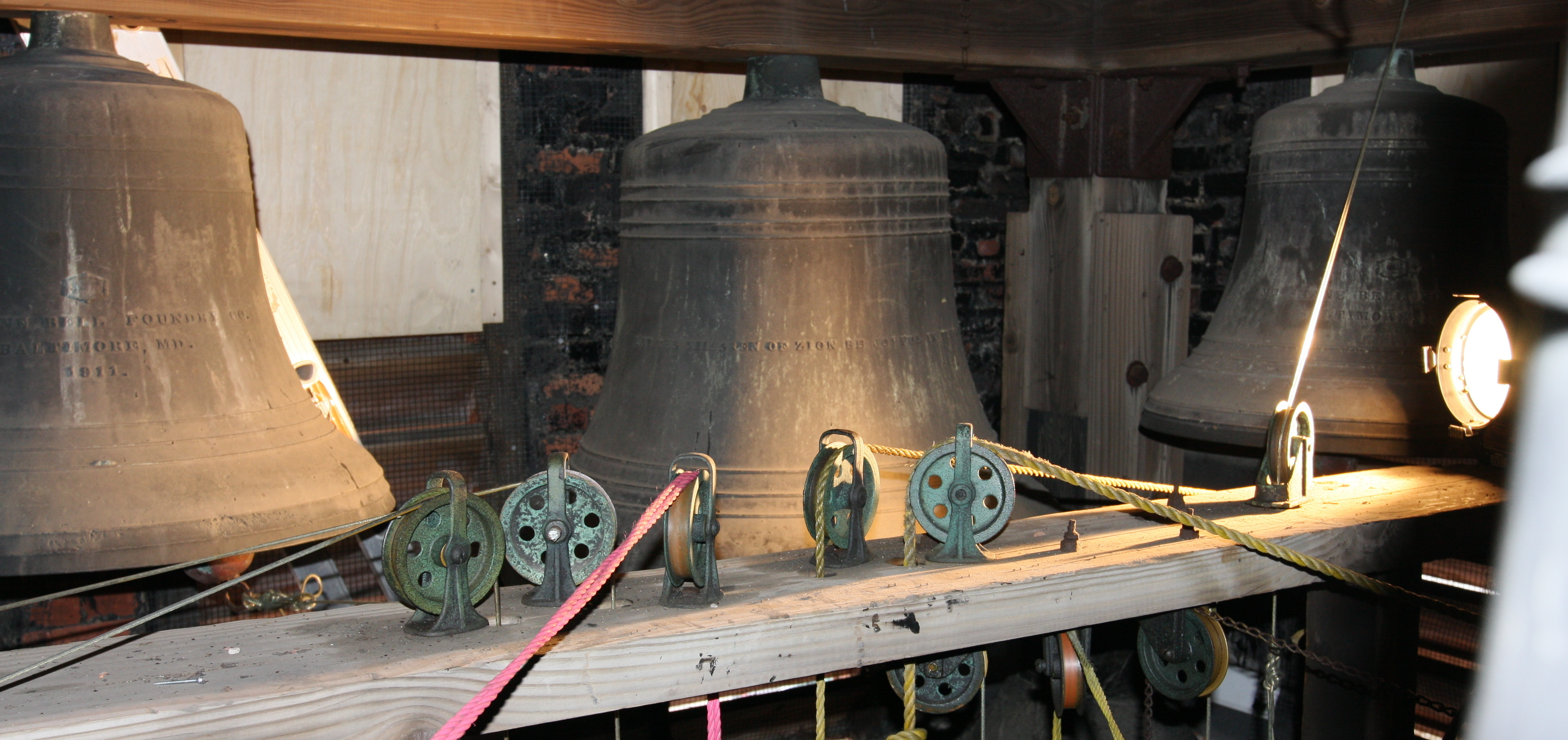
This is an image of the 6th and 9th and 4th Bells in the Highland Arts Theatre Chime.

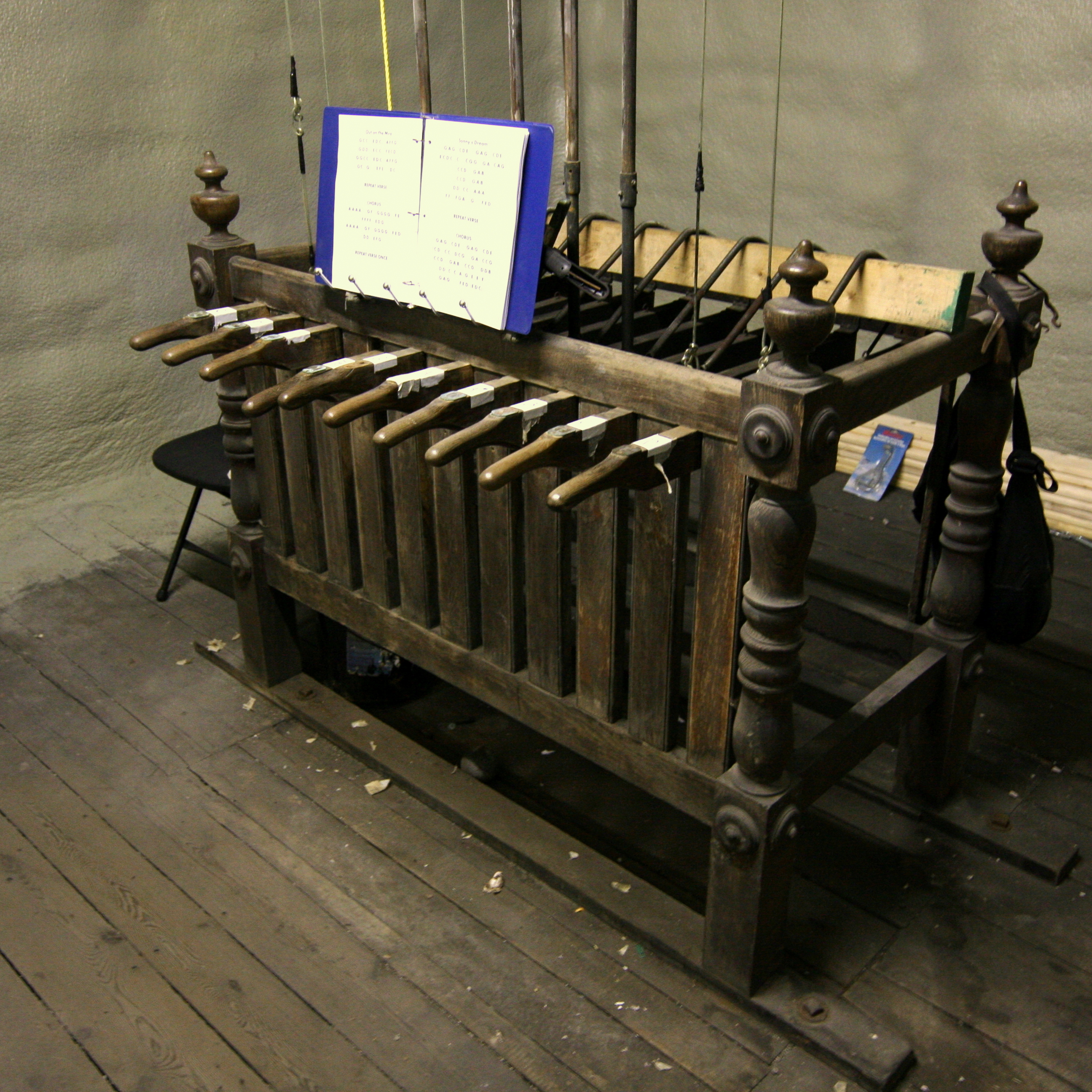
This is an image of the original essentially unmodified McShane "pump handle" chimestand with deep key-fall on all notes.
