= Bala Cynwyd Junior High School Complex =

- Lower Merion Academy-Cynwyd Elementary School-Bala Cynwyd Junior High School Complex
- U.S. National Register of Historic Places
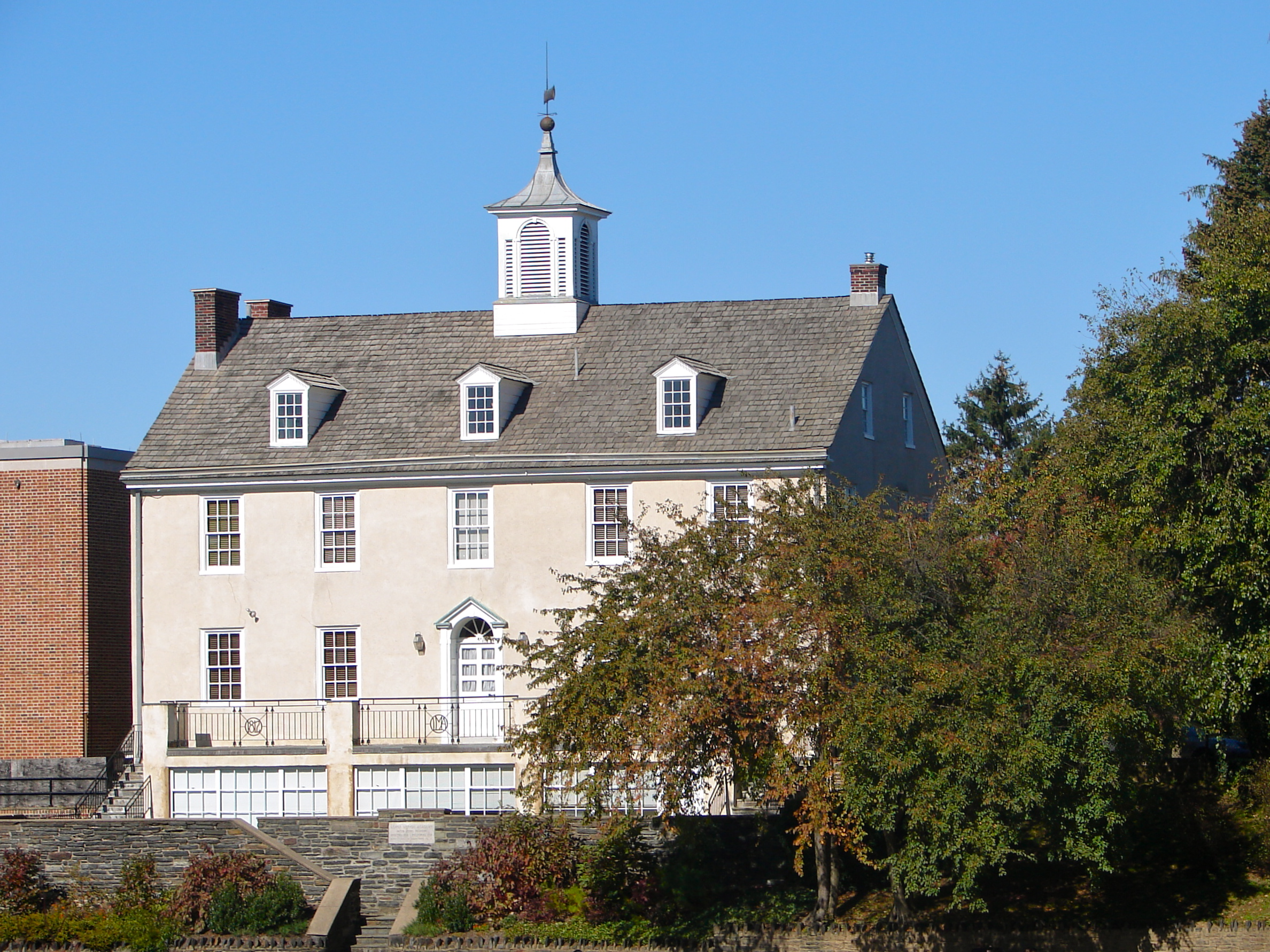
- Lower Merion Academy in October 2011

- Location within Pennsylvania Location within the United States
- Location: 506 Bryn Mawr Ave., Bala Cynwyd, Pennsylvania, U.S.
- Coordinates: 40°00′48″N 75°14′34″W
- Area: 15.9 acres (6.4 ha)
- Built: 1812, 1914, 1938
- Built by: Nathan Lewis, Joseph Price
- Architectural style: Federal, Late 19th And 20th Century Revivals
- NRHP reference No.: 02001429
- Added to NRHP: November 27, 2002

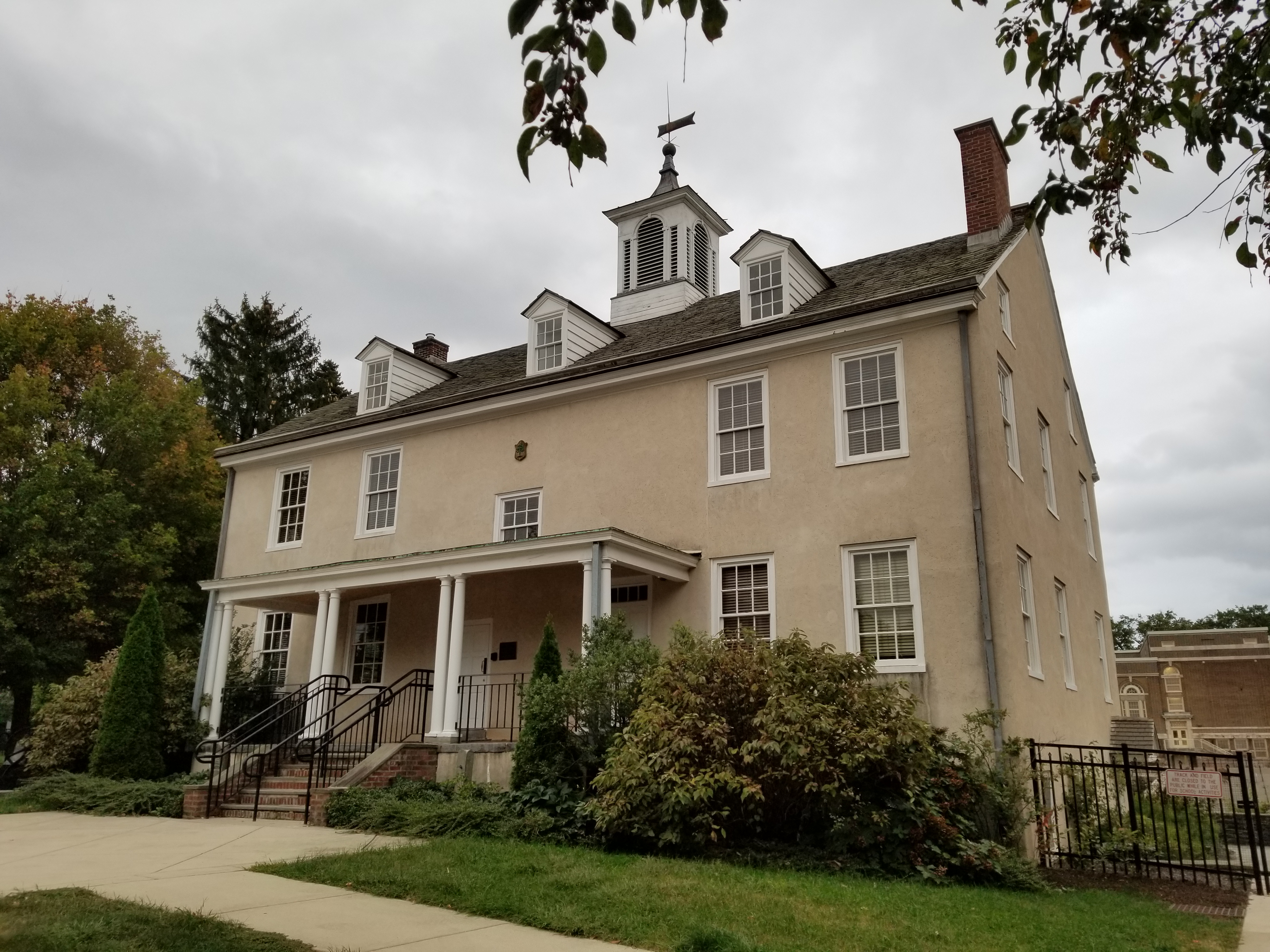
Lower Merion Academy (built 1812), Bala Cynwyd, Pennsylvania, viewed from front lane

Bala Cynwyd Junior High School Complex, is a historic school complex in Bala Cynwyd, Pennsylvania. The complex includes the Bala Cynwyd Middle School, the Cynwyd Elementary School, and the former Lower Merion Academy. The elementary school and middle schools are part of the Lower Merion School District.

== History ==
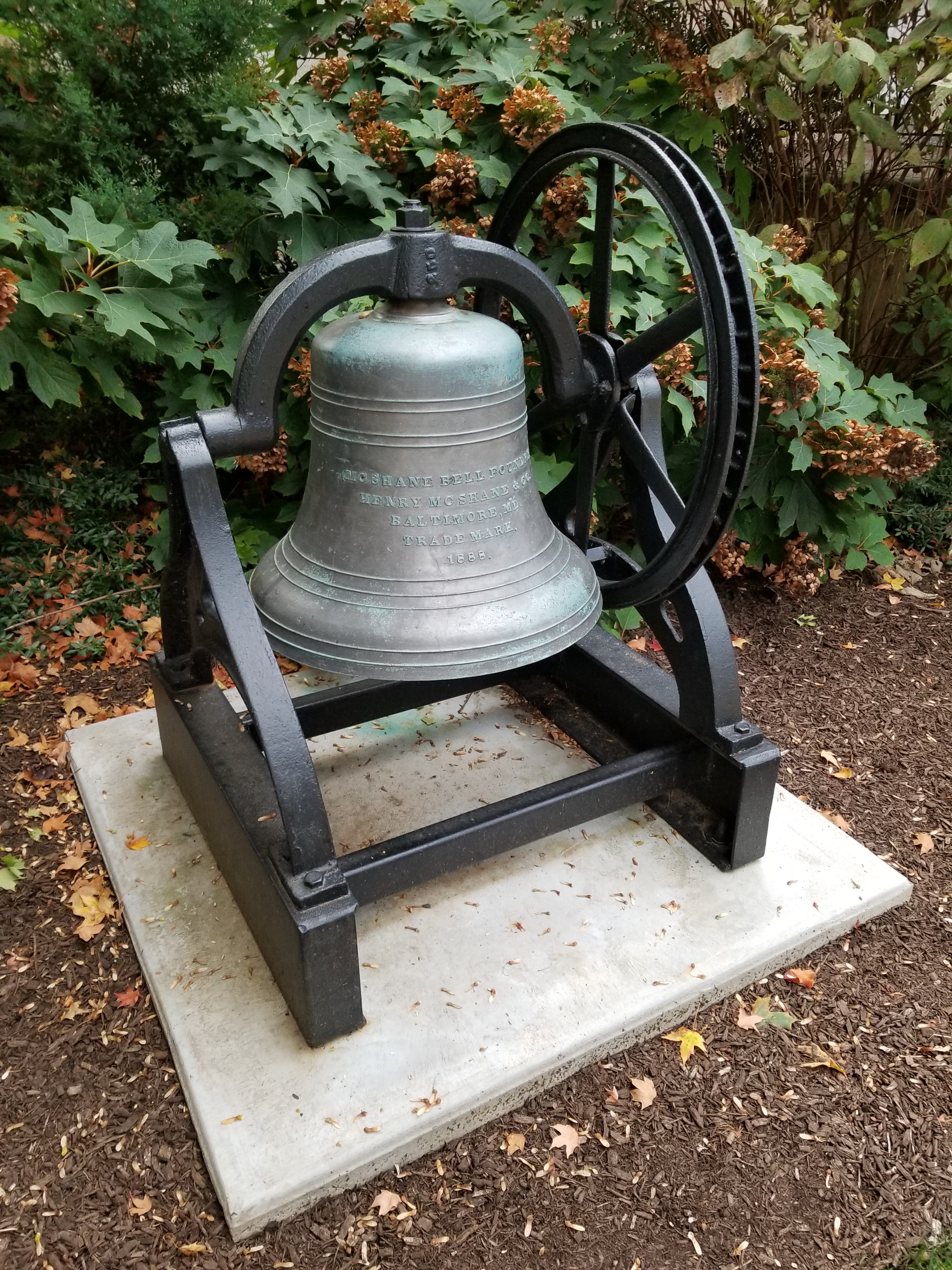
The Lower Merion Academy school bell in Bala Cynwyd, Pennsylvania, cast by McShane Bell Foundry in Baltimore in 1888 and rededicated in 1976

The Lower Merion Academy/Lower Merion Benevolent School building was built in 1812, and is a 3 1/2-story, five-bay, stuccoed stone building with cupola in the Federal style. It was renovated in 1938 in Colonial Revival style. The Cynwyd Elementary School building was built in 1914, with a rear addition built in 1920. It is a 2 1/2-story, Classical Revival style building that features white terra cotta trim and a central entrance with Ionic order columns. The Bala Cynwyd Middle School building was built in 1938, and is a long, flat, two-story brick building in the modern style. A classroom wing was added in 1963. The buildings were renovated and some additions built in 1999.

It was added to the National Register of Historic Places in 2002.

Next to the Lower Merion Academy building sits the school's old bell, cast in 1888 by McShane Bell Foundry of Baltimore, Maryland, and rededicated in 1976 according to a plaque affixed to the side.
