= McShane Bell Foundry =

Bellfounder in St. Louis, Missouri, US

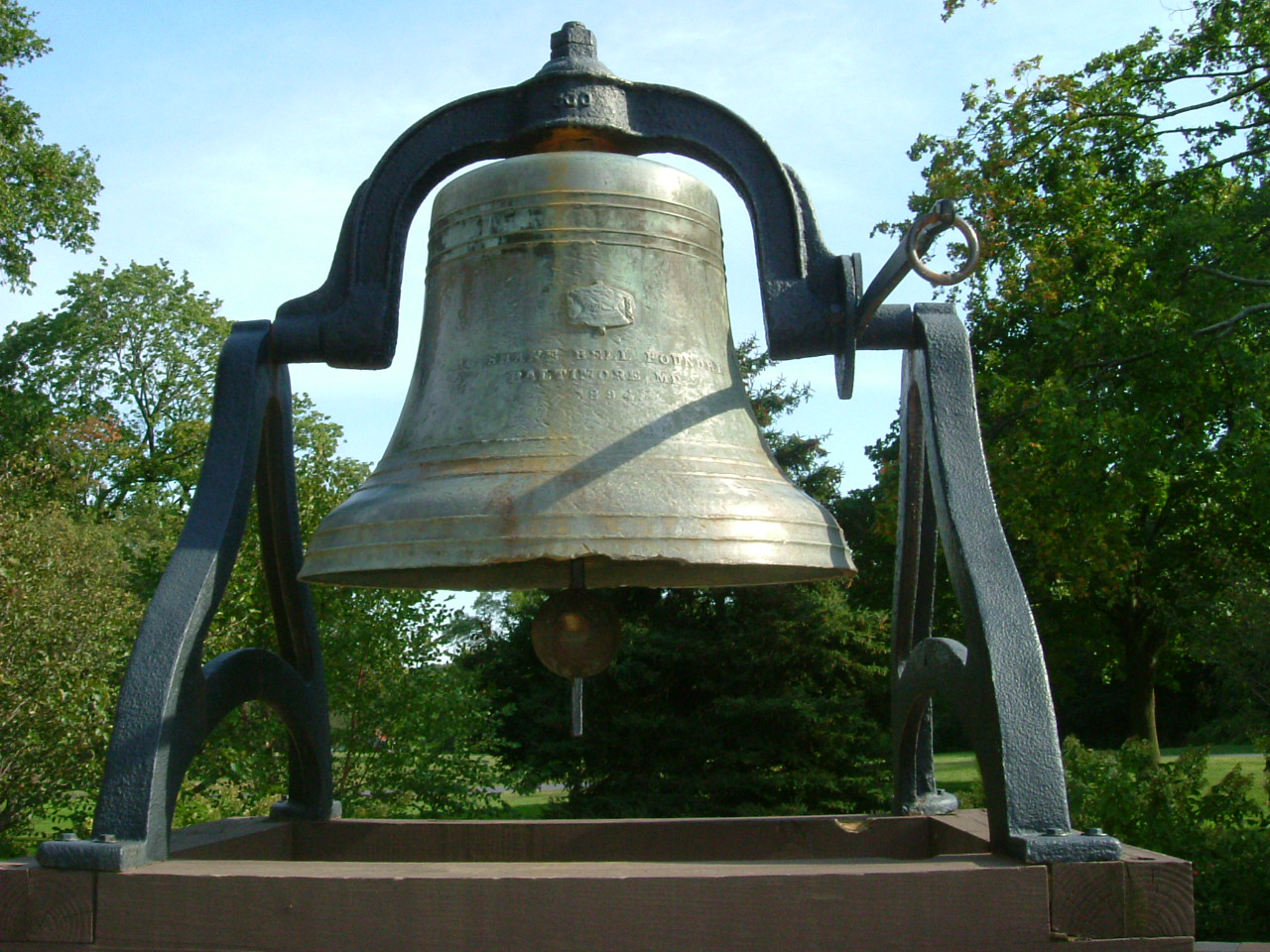
An 1894 McShane bell on the campus of Lake Forest Academy, Lake Forest, Illinois.

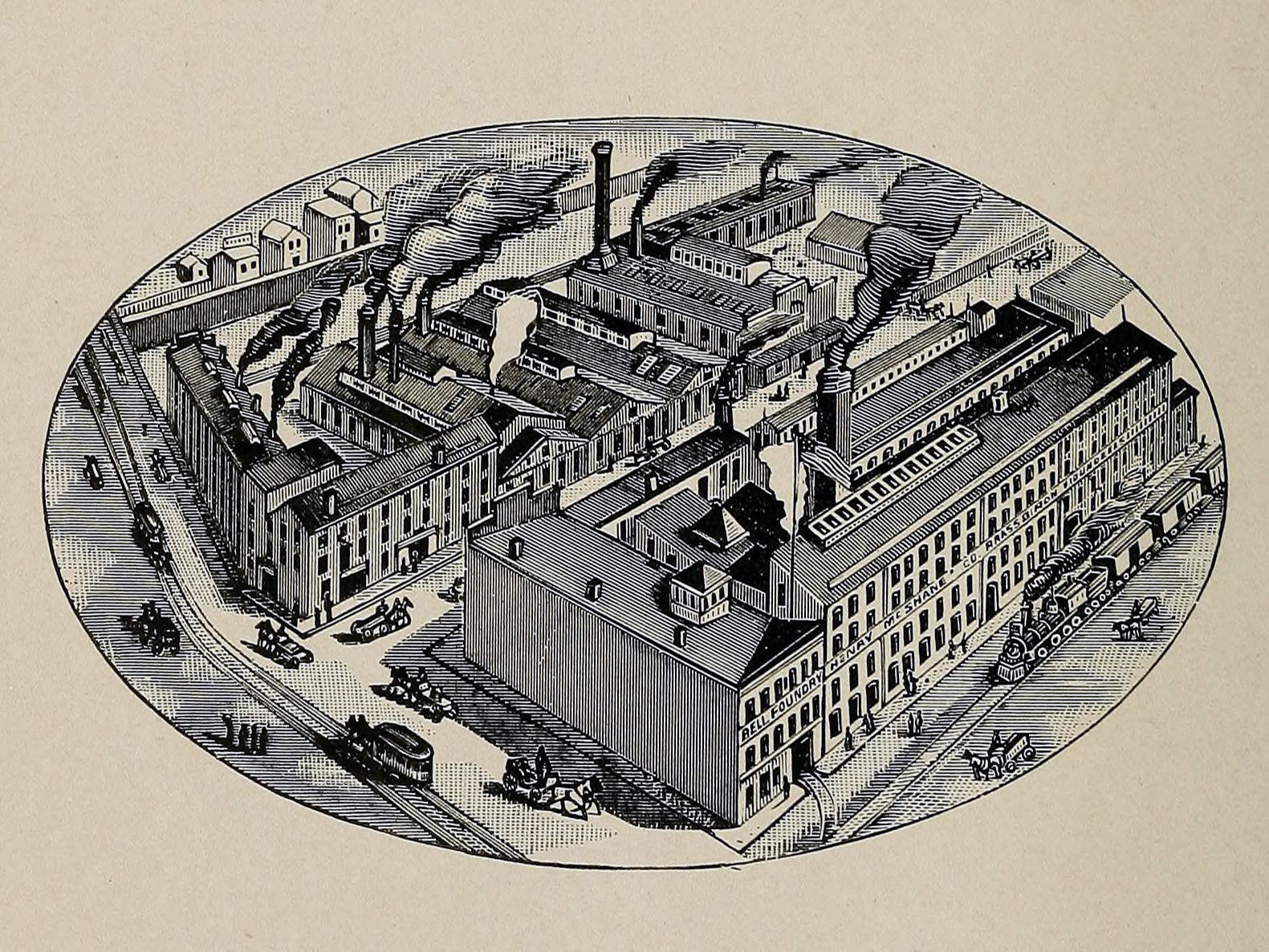
Illustration of the McShane Bell Foundry factory complex located at 415-441 North Street (Guilford Avenue), Baltimore, MD.

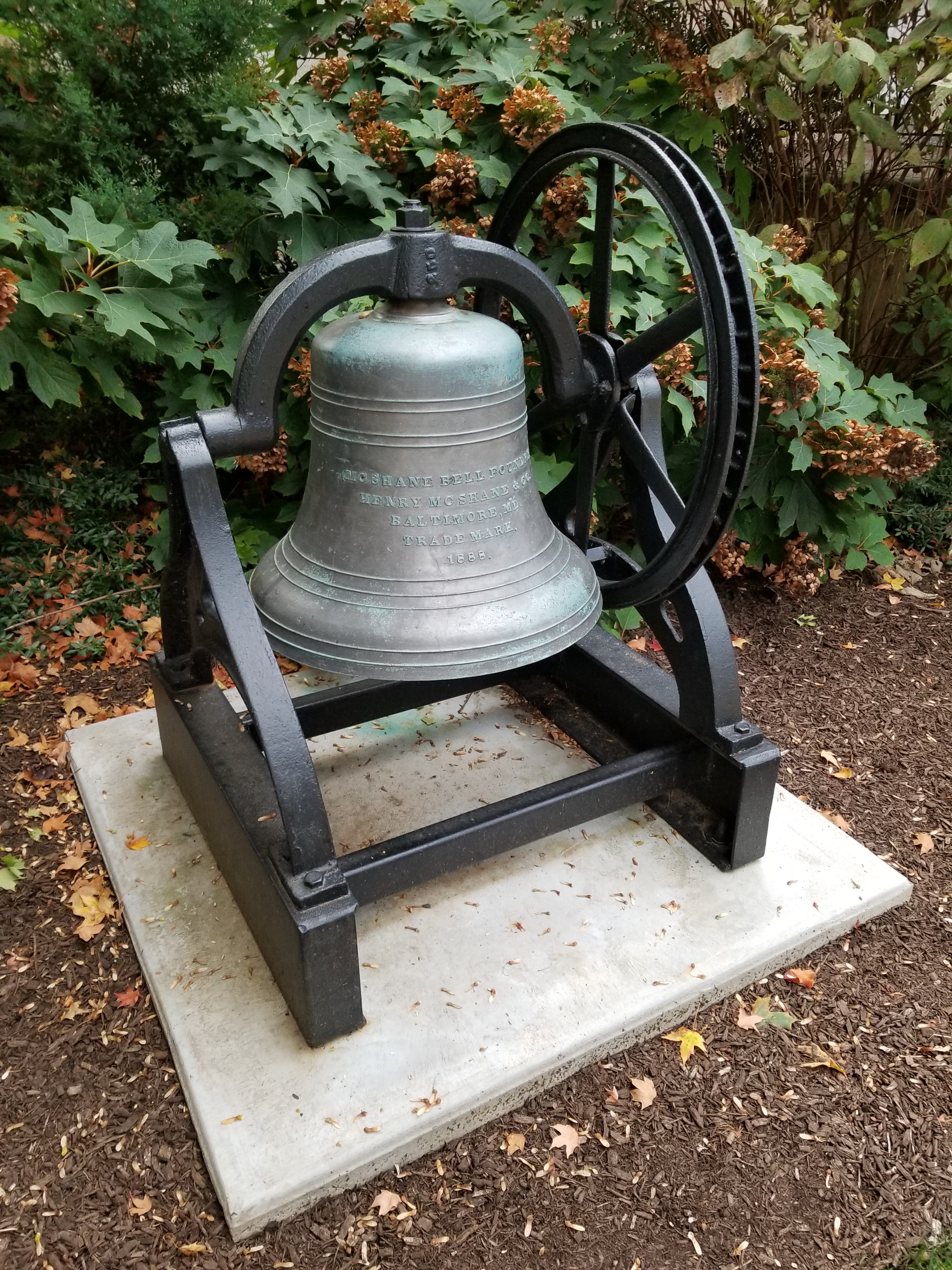
School bell cast at the McShane Bell Foundry for the Lower Merion Academy (public school) in Bala Cynwyd, Pennsylvania, 1888; rededicated 1976

The McShane Bell Foundry, located in St. Louis, Missouri, is a maker of church bells founded in 1856. Over the past 150 years, the firm has produced over 300,000 bells. In 2019, the company moved its headquarters from Glen Burnie, Maryland, a suburb of Baltimore, to St. Louis, Missouri, as it centralized its manufacturing and shipping.

== History ==
Henry McShane (1830-1889), an immigrant from Dundalk, Ireland, established the McShane Bell Foundry in Baltimore, Maryland at Holliday and Centre Streets in 1856. By the late 19th century, the business had produced tens of thousands of bells, including dozens of chimes, shipping them out to churches and public buildings across the USA and beyond, and expanded to a large factory complex on Guilford Avenue (then known as North Street). In 1935, the Henry McShane Manufacturing Company sold the foundry to William Parker, whose family continued to operate the business for three generations. The McShane Bell Foundry moved to Glen Burnie, Maryland in 1979 and was the only surviving large Western-style bell maker of the many that had once operated in the United States. Over the course of more than a century, the firm produced over 300,000 bells for cathedrals, churches, municipal buildings and schools in communities around the world, including the 7,000-pound bell that hangs in the dome of Baltimore City Hall. It was featured on an episode of the Discovery Channel's show Dirty Jobs. In 2019, ownership of the company changed, and it was relocated to St. Louis, Missouri, where it is now known as the McShane Bell Company.
