= List of botanical gardens and arboretums in Pennsylvania =

This list of botanical gardens and arboretums in Pennsylvania is intended to include all significant botanical gardens and arboretums in the U.S. state of Pennsylvania.

Name	Image	Affiliation	City	Coordinates
Ambler Arboretum		Temple University	Ambler	40°09′56″N 75°11′40″W
American College Arboretum		The American College	Bryn Mawr	40°1′0″N 75°19′41.65″W
Appleford/Parsons-Banks Arboretum			Villanova	40°3′10.44″N 75°19′32.88″W
Arboretum at Penn State		Pennsylvania State University	State College	40°48′18.19″N 77°51′50.72″W
Arboretum at the Reading Public Museum		Reading Public Museum	Reading	40°19′38.64″N 75°57′4.68″W
Arboretum at Penn State Behrend		Penn State Erie, The Behrend College	Erie	42°7′15.92″N 79°58′56.78″W
Arboretum of the Barnes Foundation		Barnes Foundation	Merion	39°59′53.08″N 75°14′30.89″W
Arboretum Villanova		Villanova University	Villanova	40°2′13.3″N 75°20′35.94″W
Awbury Arboretum			Philadelphia (East Germantown)	40°03′06″N 75°10′08″W
Bartram's Garden			Philadelphia (Fairmount Park)	39°55′50″N 75°12′45″W
Bowman's Hill Wildflower Preserve			New Hope	40°19′48.36″N 74°56′26.16″W
Brandywine Wildflower and Native Plant Gardens		Brandywine River Museum	Chadds Ford	39°52′11.64″N 75°35′35.3″W
Bryn Mawr Campus Arboretum		Bryn Mawr College	Bryn Mawr	40°1′34.68″N 75°18′46.32″W
Centennial Arboretum			Philadelphia (Fairmount Park)	39°58′58.64″N 75°12′37.61″W
Chanticleer Garden			Wayne	40°1′49.8″N 75°23′11.6″W
Chatham University Arboretum		Chatham University	Pittsburgh	40°26′51.25″N 79°55′24.38″W
Crozer Arboretum			Upland	39°51′25.6″N 75°22′7.32″W
William F. Curtis Arboretum		Cedar Crest College	Allentown	40°35′12.73″N 75°30′54.29″W
Curtis Arboretum		Cheltenham Township	Wyncote	40°5′6.23″N 75°8′52.6″W
Graver Arboretum		Muhlenberg College	Bath	40°48′0.36″N 75°21′48.6″W
Haverford College Arboretum		Haverford College	Haverford	40°0′41.83″N 75°17′56.22″W
Henry Foundation for Botanical Research			Gladwyne	40°2′N 75°17′W
Hershey Gardens		M.S. Hershey Foundation	Hershey	40°17′55.32″N 76°39′25.2″W
Holtwood Arboretum			Holtwood	39°50′13.2″N 76°19′48″W
The Horticulture Center			Philadelphia (Fairmount Park)	39°59′0.24″N 75°12′36.72″W
Jenkins Arboretum			Devon	40°3′41.98″N 75°25′57.36″W
Lake Erie Arboretum			Erie	42°7′6.6″N 80°7′3.14″W
Longwood Gardens			Kennett Square	39°52′16.32″N 75°40′28.92″W
Marywood University Arboretum		Marywood University	Scranton	41°26′1.32″N 75°38′3.12″W
Merion Botanical Park			Merion	39°59′41.64″N 75°15′2.88″W
Mont Alto Arboretum		Penn State Mont Alto	Mont Alto	40°48′36.14″N 77°52′38.78″W
Morris Arboretum		University of Pennsylvania	Philadelphia	40°05′23″N 75°13′27″W
National Aviary			Pittsburgh	40°27′11.88″N 80°0′36″W
Phipps Conservatory and Botanical Gardens			Pittsburgh	40°26′20.21″N 79°56′51.74″W
Pittsburgh Botanic Garden			Pittsburgh	40°24′46.44″N 80°10′19.92″W
Renziehausen Park Rose Garden and Arboretum			McKeesport	40°20′24.36″N 79°49′26.76″W
Rodef Shalom Biblical Botanical Garden		Rodef Shalom Congregation	Pittsburgh	40°26′51″N 79°56′38″W
Henry Schmieder Arboretum		Delaware Valley College	Doylestown	40°17′55.66″N 75°9′31.49″W
Scott Arboretum		Swarthmore College	Swarthmore	39°54′21.96″N 75°21′8.64″W
Swiss Pines			Malvern	40°5′25.66″N 75°33′8.46″W
Louise Arnold Tanger Arboretum			Lancaster	40°2′33.36″N 76°19′47.28″W
Taylor Memorial Arboretum			Wallingford	39°52′19.2″N 75°22′12″W
John J. Tyler Arboretum			Media	39°56′05″N 75°25′52″W
Welkinweir			Pottstown	40°9′13″N 75°40′55″W

== See also ==
- List of botanical gardens and arboretums in the United States
