= Harriton House =

Historic house in Pennsylvania, United States

- Bryn Mawr
- U.S. National Register of Historic Places
- Pennsylvania state historical marker
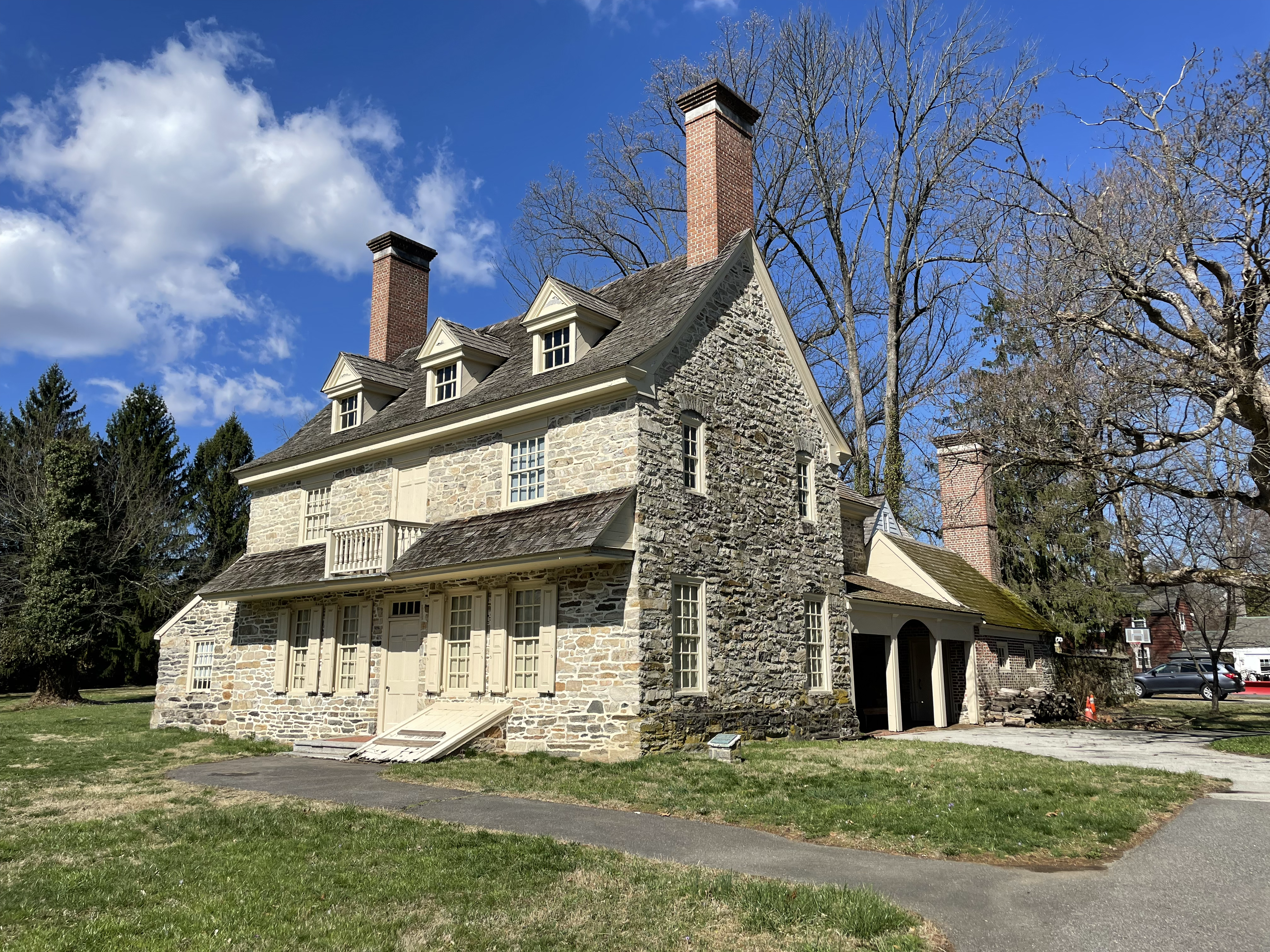
- Harriton House in March 2025

- Location within Pennsylvania Location within the United States
- Location: 500 Harriton Road, Bryn Mawr, Pennsylvania
- Coordinates: 40°02′05″N 75°18′41″W
- Area: 13.8 acres (5.6 ha)
- Built: 1704
- NRHP reference No.: 73001643

Significant dates
- Added to NRHP: July 2, 1973
- Designated PHMC: June 12, 1963

Harriton House, originally known as Bryn Mawr, is an historic house which is located on the Philadelphia Main Line, and was most famously the residence of Founding Father Charles Thomson, the secretary of the Continental Congress.

It was added to the National Register of Historic Places in 1973.

== History and architectural features ==
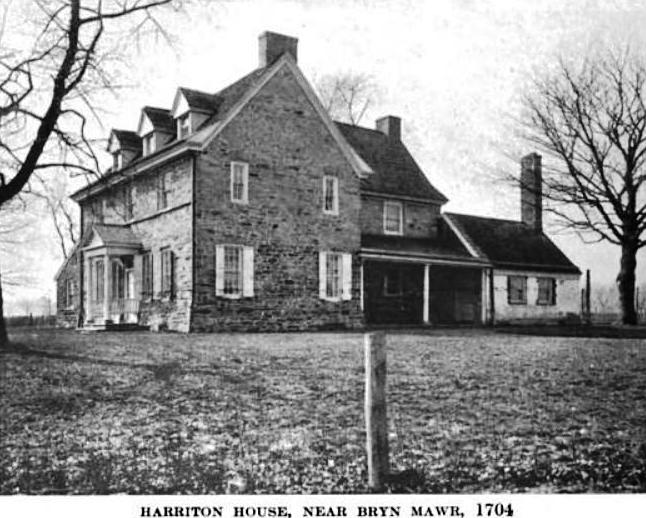
Harriton House as it appeared c. 1919. Changes were made in the 20th century by the Harriton Association to return the front portions of the house to its Revolutionary War-era appearance.

Originally built in 1704 by Rowland Ellis, a Welsh Quaker, it was called Bryn Mawr, meaning high hill. The modern town of Bryn Mawr is named after the house, and the National Register of Historic Places has it listed under the original name.

It was originally designed as a T-shaped, two-story fieldstone dwelling with a gable roof. The original front section is approximately thirty-seven feet wide and twenty-two feet deep and the rear extension is approximately eighteen feet wide and twenty-three feet deep. A one-story brick kitchen was added to the end of the rear extension. The house was renovated in 1911 and major additions were made in 1926.

It was added to the National Register of Historic Places in 1973.

== Harriton Association ==
The Harriton Association was started in 1962 by a group of people who were concerned that the house and its surrounding grounds, which were privately owned at the time, would be subdivided and developed. The creation of the group was spearheaded by W. Dallas "Bob" Saybolt, a Philadelphia furniture manufacturer (Saybolt & Cleland Inc.) who served as the first president of the Harriton Association. The association removed the 1926 additions and restored the house to look as it did when Charles Thomson lived there. Those renovations were completed in time for the 1976 United States Bicentennial.

The association operates Harriton House as a museum and cultural resource. Tours are given from Wednesday through Saturday, and special events are held at the house throughout the year.
