= Bartschi =

Bartschi or Bärtschi (sometimes also spelled Baertschi) is a Swiss German surname. Notable people with the surname include:

- Arnold Bartschi (1903–1996), who established the Swiss Pines arboretum in Malvern, Pennsylvania
- Patrik Bärtschi (born 1984), a Swiss professional ice hockey player
- Sven Bärtschi (born 1992), a Swiss ice hockey player
