= Edward Barnes Leisenring Jr. =

American businessman (1926–2011)

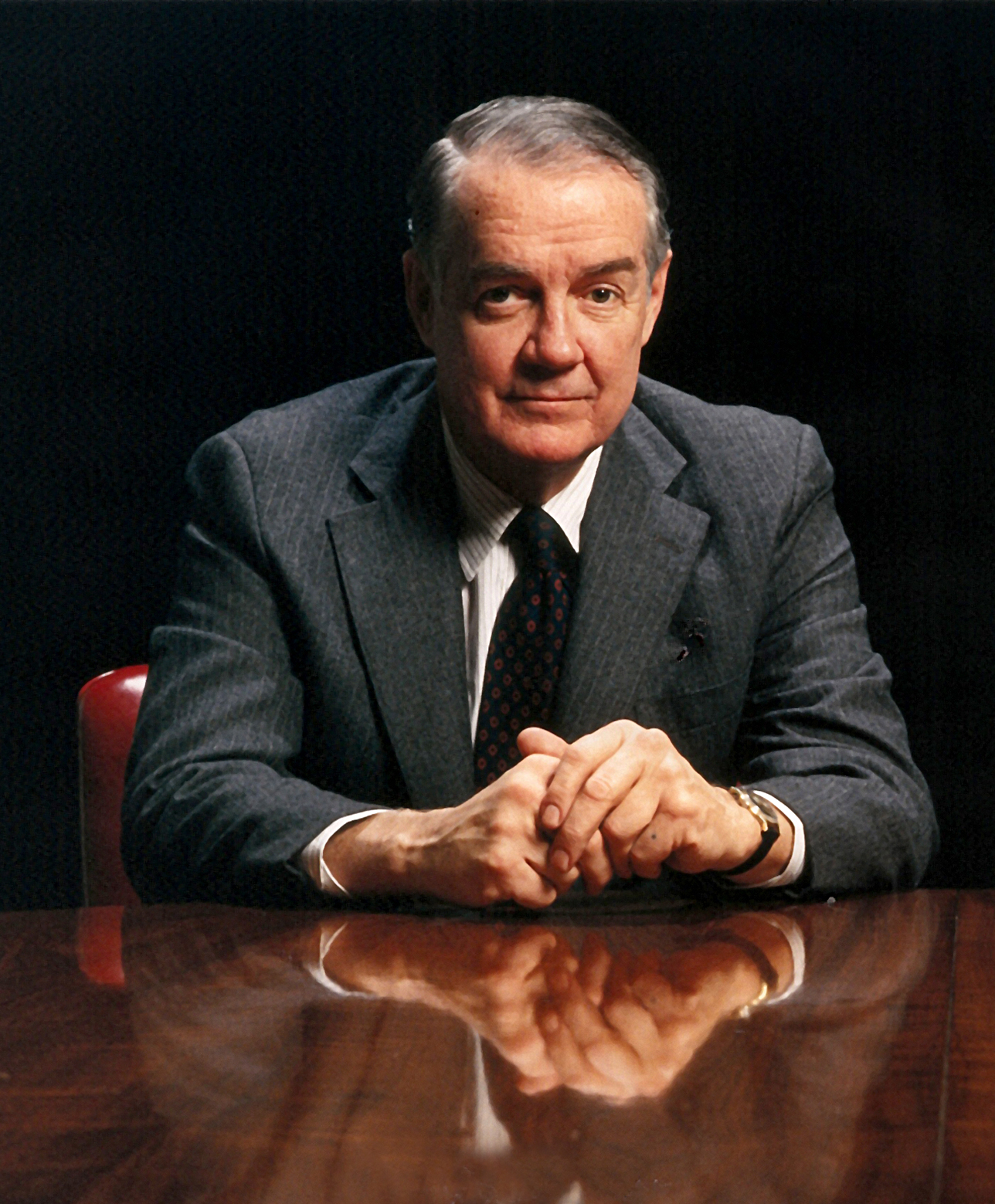

Edward Barnes Leisenring Jr. (pronounced LYES-en-ring) (January 25, 1926 – March 2, 2011) was president of the Westmoreland Coal Company from 1961 to 1988 and chairman of the board from 1988 to 1998.

== Early life and education ==
Leisenring was born on January 25, 1926, to Edward Barnes Leisenring Sr. in Bryn Mawr, Pennsylvania. He was a graduate of the Hotchkiss School in Lakeville, Connecticut, and Yale University in 1944. In 1951, he married Julia du Pont Bissell and they had three children: Erica B. Leisenring, Edward W. Leisenring and John Leisenring.

== Career ==
Leisenring was president of Westmoreland Coal Company, the oldest coal company in America, from 1961 to 1988 and chairman for another 10 years. Incorporated in 1854, Westmoreland traces its roots to a company founded in 1835 by Mr. Leisenring's great-grandfather John Leisenring Jr.

In 1978, as chairman of the Bituminous Coal Operators Association, Leisenring ignored pleas from President Jimmy Carter to settle quickly, while leading industry negotiators during a bitter 111-day mine workers’ strike. Ultimately he helped win a settlement that gave miners a 37% pay increase over the next 3 years but failed to address the critical issue of wildcat strikes.

Leisenring was the longest-serving director of Norfolk Southern Railway, serving on its board from 1961 to 1998. He was a director of Fidelity Bank from 1960 to 1996 and of SKF industries from 1966 to 1996. He served as vice chair of the Eisenhower Fellowships and the Philadelphia Contributionship. He served on the board of the Lankenau Hospital and Foundation for over 50 years.

== Death ==
He died of heart failure on March 2, 2011, at his winter home in Aiken, South Carolina.
