= Rowland Ellis =

Welsh landowner and politician (1650–1731)

Ellis' coat of arms

Rowland Ellis (c. 1650 – 1 July 1731) was a Welsh-born landowner and politician who immigrated to the Province of Pennsylvania, where he spent the rest of his life. Ellis was born c. 1650 in Wales. The owner of the "Bryn Mawr" farm near Dolgellau, Merionethshire, he became a Quaker after English religious leader George Fox visited Dolgellau in 1657. As a result of religious persecution against Quakers in Wales, Ellis and a number of other Welsh Quakers emigrated to Pennsylvania, an English colony in North America, in 1686. A new settlement established in the colony was later named Bryn Mawr after Ellis's farm.

In 1688, Ellis returned to Wales to settle his affairs before returning to Pennsylvania, where he entered into a political career and was elected to the Pennsylvania Provincial Assembly representing the constituency of Philadelphia in 1700. He died on 1 July 1731. In 1969, Welsh writer Marion Eames, who lived in Dolgellau at the time, wrote a historical novel of the emigration of Welsh Quakers, including Ellis, to Pennsylvania. Published under the Welsh title Y Stafell Ddirgel, subsequent English translations were published as The Secret Room.
