= Polly Platt (author) =

- Born: January 9, 1927; Bryn Mawr, Pennsylvania
- Died: December 26, 2008 (aged 81); Vienna, Austria
- Education: Wellesley College
- Occupations: author, journalist
- Spouse: Alexander Grchich

Polly Platt (9 January 1927 in Bryn Mawr, Pennsylvania – 26 December 2008) was an American author specializing in books related to Americans living or working in France. She also had a professional background working as a consultant, seminar leader, and public speaker.

== Biography ==
Platt graduated from Wellesley College and was a journalist with the Philadelphia Evening Bulletin and the New York Post before moving to Paris in 1967 with her Serbian husband, Alexander Grchich, a UNESCO official, and their five children.

In 1986, Platt established a training company in France, called "Culture Crossings", which offered seminars and workshops on living in France and intercultural management issues. Participants included corporate executives and spouses from companies doing business in France. Real-life anecdotes of cultural confusion, anger and disorientation culled from the seminars became the centerpiece of Platt's bestselling 1994 book on French culture, French or Foe?. Financial Times refers to this book as the "Bible for Anglo-Saxon executives doing business in France."

She was profiled in newspapers including The International Herald Tribune, The Independent, Le Figaro, L'Express, Paris Match, Irish Times, and on television programs such as the Nightly Business Report and Europe 2000. She was featured twice on the Today Show, interviewed by Bryant Gumbel in Cannes and by Matt Lauer halfway up the Eiffel Tower.

She died on December 26, 2008, in Vienna, Austria.

== Publications ==
Platt wrote Savoir-Flair, 211 Tips for Enjoying France and the French (2000), which was published as a companion to French or Foe?. Her third book, Love à la Française - What Happens When Hervé Meets Sally? (2008), follows the lives of American women and the French loves of their life.
