= The Secret Room =

1969 novel by Marion Eames

First edition

Y Stafell Ddirgel (in English, The Secret Room) is a novel by Marion Eames written in the Welsh language and first published in 1969. An English translation was published in 1975 under the title The Secret Room. In 2001 a highly successful television adaptation appeared on S4C.

The novel is concerned with the persecution of Quakers in North Wales during the seventeenth century. A sequel by Eames, Y Rhandir Mwyn (The Gentle Region) (1990), continues the story. Y Stafell Ddirgel has been a set book for GCSE Welsh Literature students.

== Plot summary ==
The story is set in the reign of King Charles II of England and follows the experiences of Quaker leader Rowland Ellis who founded a Welsh colony in Pennsylvania after being forced to leave Wales because of religious persecution.

Rowland Ellis becomes a Quaker as a result of the influence of a neighbour, but his wife does not share his religious beliefs. Following her death, he marries a sympathetic cousin. He is betrayed to the authorities by a servant he has dismissed, who describes a "secret room" he claims to have seen in the house, containing objects of Catholic worship. However, this is not the main reason why the novel is named "The Secret Room", as it also refers to the secret room within one's heart where the inner light is found. Ellis and his fellow Quakers are imprisoned and illegally condemned to death, but are released following the direct intervention of the king. Nevertheless, they decide to leave Wales for a better life in America.
