= Bryn Mawr, Pennsylvania =

Unincorporated community in Pennsylvania, US

Bryn Mawr
- Census-designated place
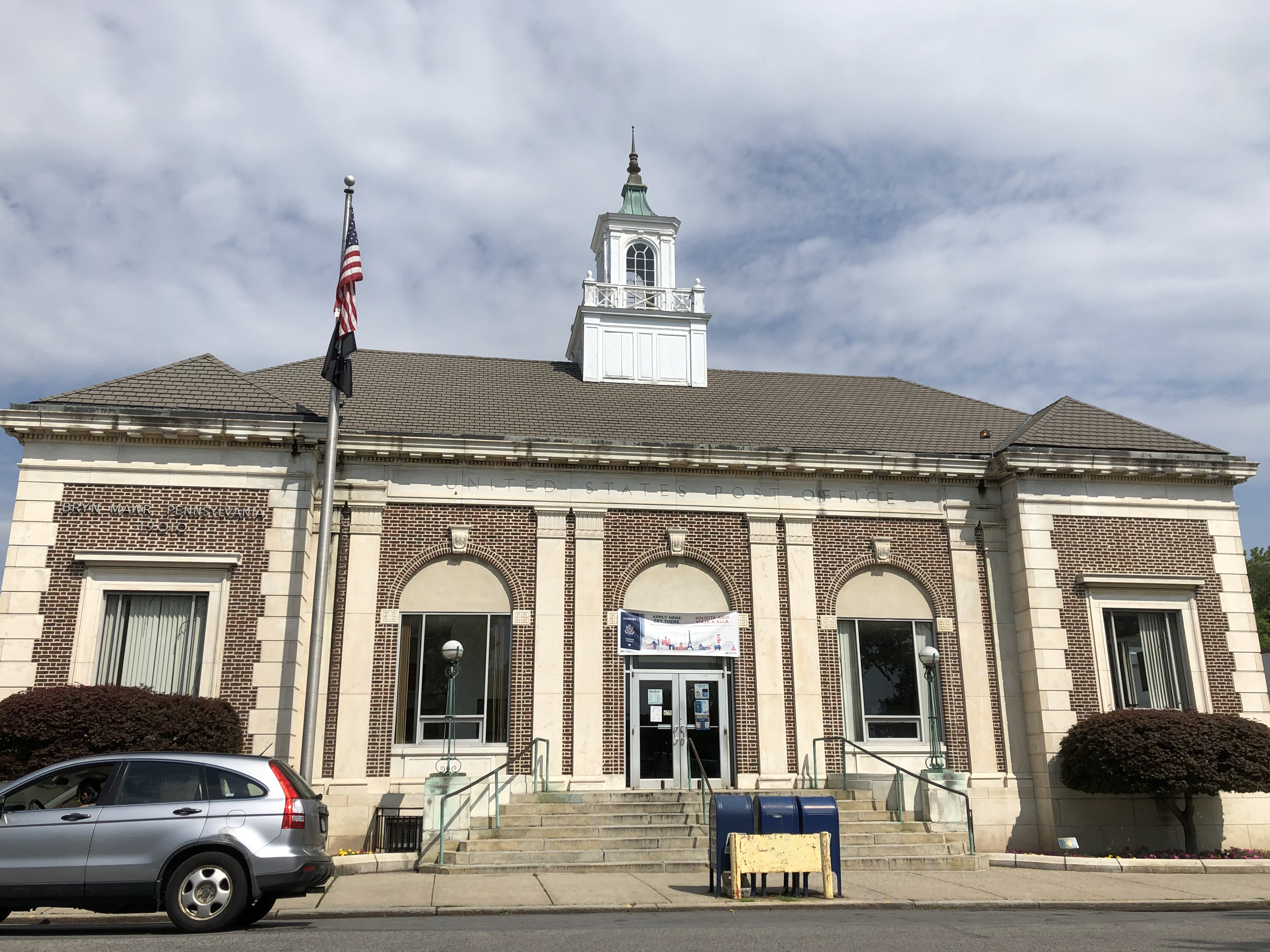
- Bryn Mawr post office
- Etymology: an estate near Dolgellau in Wales that belonged to Rowland Ellis
- Location within Pennsylvania Location within the United States
- Coordinates: 40°01′16″N 75°19′01″W
- Country: United States
- State: Pennsylvania
- County: Montgomery (part); Delaware (part)
- Township: Lower Merion (part); Haverford (part); Radnor (part)
- Established: 1681

Area
  - Total: 0.96 sq mi (2.48 km^{2})
  - Land: 0.96 sq mi (2.48 km^{2})
  - Water: 0 sq mi (0.00 km^{2})
- Elevation: 420 ft (130 m)

Population (2020)
  - Total: 5,879
  - Density: 6,142.3/sq mi (2,371.54/km^{2})
- Time zone: UTC-5 (EST)
  - Summer (DST): UTC-4 (EDT)
- ZIP Code: 19010
- Area codes: 610 and 484
- FIPS code: 42-09728

Bryn Mawr (/brɪn ˈmɑːr/ brin MAR; from Welsh for 'big hill', IPA: [brɨn ˈmaur]) is a census-designated place (CDP) located in Delaware County, Pennsylvania, United States. It is located just west of Philadelphia along Lancaster Avenue, also known as U.S. Route 30. As of 2020, the CDP is defined to include sections of Lower Merion Township, Montgomery County, as well as portions of Haverford Township and Radnor Township.

Bryn Mawr is located toward the center of what is known as the Main Line, a group of affluent Philadelphia suburban villages stretching from the city limits to Malvern. They became home to sprawling country estates belonging to Philadelphia's wealthiest families during the Gilded Age, and over the decades became a bastion of old money. As of the 2020 census, it had a population of 5,879. Bryn Mawr is home to Bryn Mawr College, and contains a sizable amount of student rentals, with roughly half of the community's population aged 18–24.

== History ==
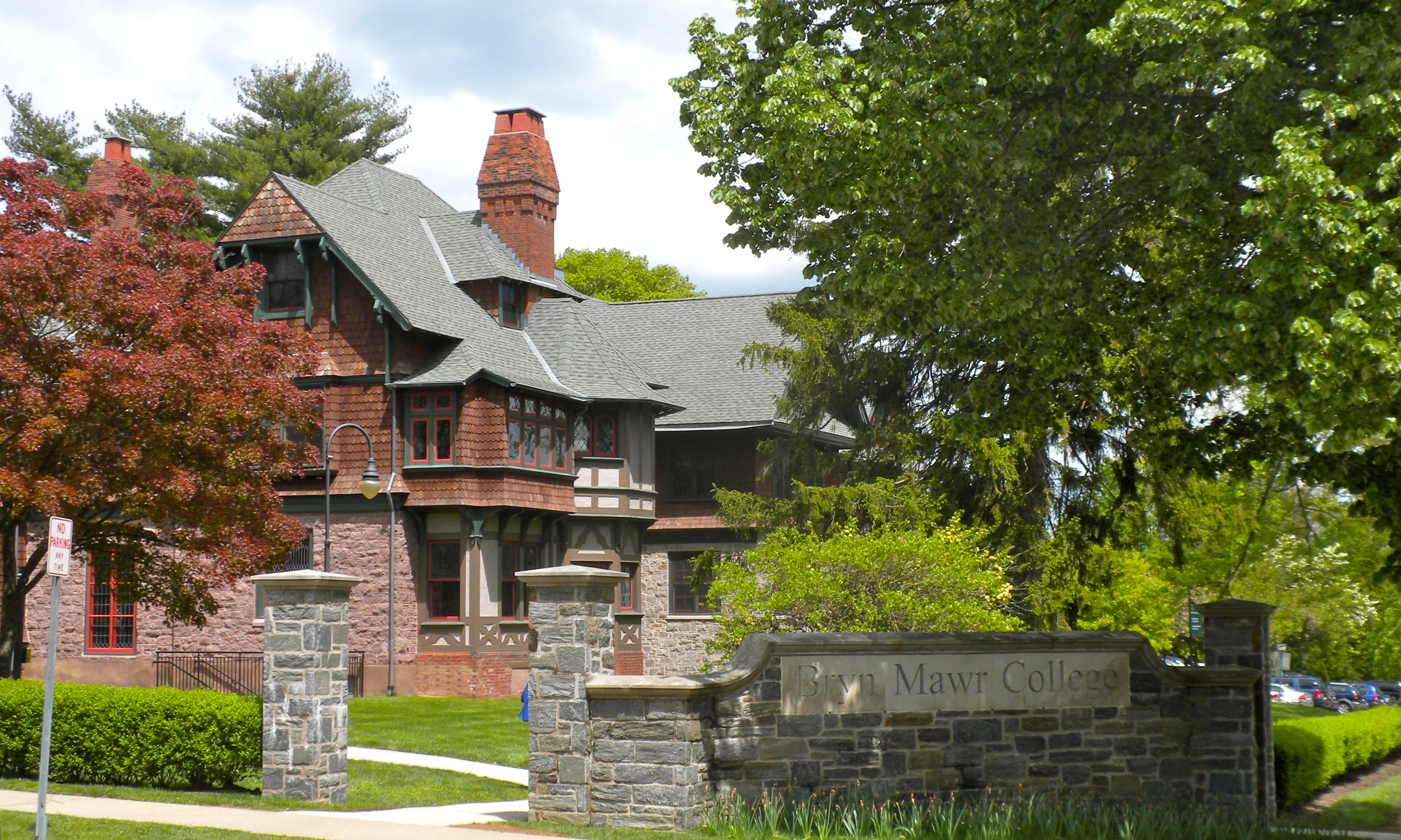
Bryn Mawr College

Bryn Mawr is named after an estate near Dolgellau in Wales that belonged to Rowland Ellis, a Welsh Quaker who emigrated in 1686 to Pennsylvania to escape religious persecution. Here he built a replica of his home in Wales, which he also called Bryn Mawr.

Until the construction of the Pennsylvania Railroad's Main Line in 1869, the town, located in the old Welsh Tract, was known as Humphreysville, named for early settlers of the Humphreys family. The town was renamed, after Rowland Ellis's estate, by railroad agent William H. Wilson after he acquired on behalf of the railroad the 283 acres (1.15 km^{2}) that now compose Bryn Mawr.

To encourage visitors the railroad constructed the Bryn Mawr Hotel adjacent to the new station, which opened in 1872. After a fire destroyed the original building, a distinctive new hotel designed by architect Frank Furness was built in 1889. The second hotel building is currently occupied by The Baldwin School and was added to the National Register of Historic Places in 1979.

Bryn Mawr College was founded in 1885 originally as a Quaker institution but by 1893, it had become non-denominational.

In 1893, the first hospital, Bryn Mawr Hospital, was built on the Main Line by Dr. George Gerhard. Glenays, a historic home dating to 1859, was listed on the National Register of Historic Places in 1977.

In the 1990 U.S. census, the 2000 U.S. census, and the 2010 U.S. census, the CDP was located entirely in Lower Merion Township, Montgomery County. For the 2020 U.S. census, the U.S. Census Bureau redefined the CDP to, in addition, include portions of Haverford Township and Radnor Township in Delaware County.

== Geography ==
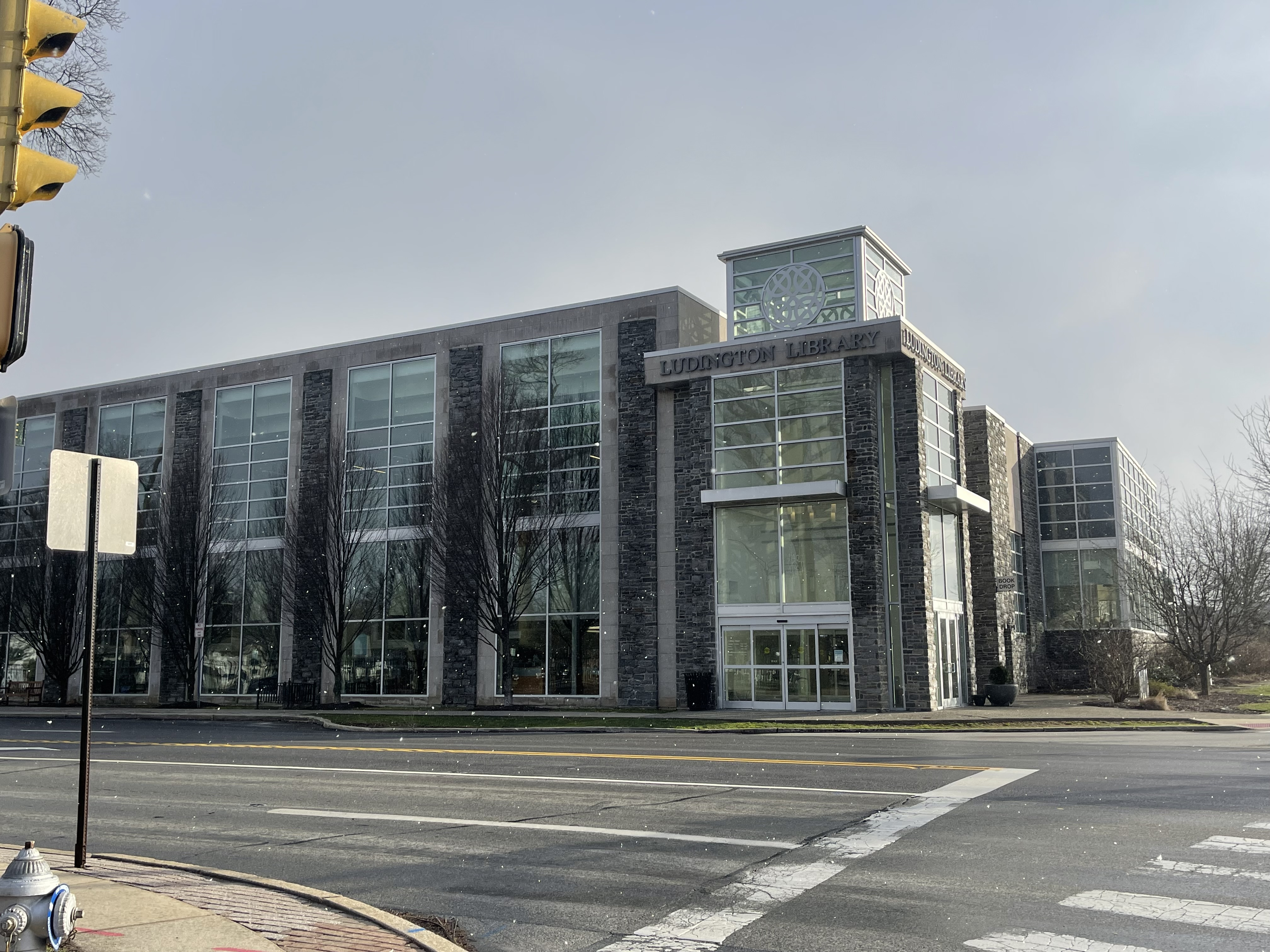
Ludington Library, part of the Lower Merion Library System

According to the U.S. Census Bureau, in 2000, Bryn Mawr had a total area of 0.6 square miles (1.6 km^{2}), all land, all in Lower Merion Township in Montgomery County.

However, the Bryn Mawr ZIP Code of 19010 covers a larger area. As a result, the geographic term Bryn Mawr is often used in a sense that includes not only the CDP, but also other areas that share the ZIP Code. These other areas include the community of Rosemont within Lower Merion Township and Radnor Township, and various other areas within Lower Merion Township, Radnor Township, and Haverford Township. Bryn Mawr is a part of the Philadelphia Main Line, a string of picturesque towns located along a railroad that connects Philadelphia with points west. Some other Main Line communities include Ardmore, Wynnewood, Narberth, Bala Cynwyd and Villanova.

== Demographics ==
Historical population
Census	Pop.	Note	%±
1990	3,271		—
2000	4,382		34.0%
2010	3,779		−13.8%
2020	5,879		55.6%

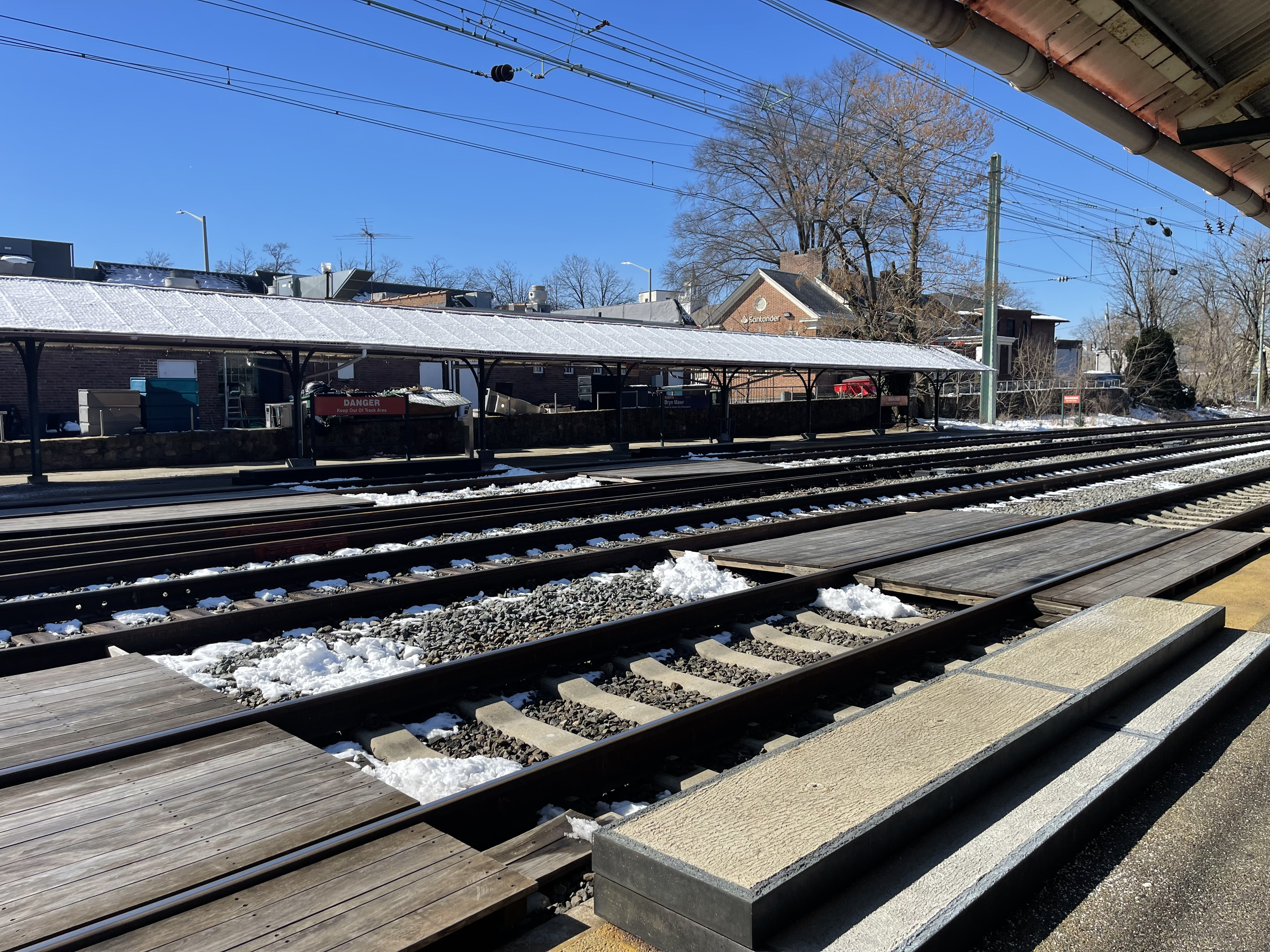
Bryn Mawr station

As of the 2010 census,, there were 3,779 people, 1,262 households, and 497 families residing in the CDP. The population density was 7,033.7 people per square mile (2,715.7 people/km^{2}). There were 1,481 housing units at an average density of 2,377.2 per square mile (917.8/km^{2}). The racial makeup of the CDP was 74.0% White, 10.5% Black or African American, 0.0% Native American, 10.7% Asian, 0.1% Pacific Islander, 1.2% from other races, and 3.6% from two or more races. 4.9% of the population were Hispanic or Latino of any race. 21.1% were of Irish, 10.8% Italian, 6.8% German and 6.4% English ancestry, according to the 2000 census.

There were 1,404 households, out of which 13.5% had children under the age of 18 living with them, 26.8% were married couples living together, 8.9% had a female householder with no husband present, and 62.6% were non-families. 41.1% of all households were made up of individuals, and 13.7% had someone living alone who was 65 years of age or older. The average household size was 2.07 and the average family size was 2.79.

In the CDP, the population was spread out, with 8.4% under the age of 18, 48.1% from 18 to 24, 21.0% from 25 to 44, 12.1% from 45 to 64, and 10.5% who were 65 years of age or older. The median age was 22 years. For every 100 females, there were 46.5 males. For every 100 females age 18 and over, there were 42.4 males.

As of the U.S. census, the median income for a household in the CDP was $47,721, and the median income for a family was $66,369. Males had a median income of $40,625 versus $31,618 for females. The per capita income for the CDP was $23,442. About 5.3% of families and 21.7% of the population were below the poverty line, including 23.6% of those under age 18 and 2.5% of those age 65 or over.

As of the 2000 census, the Bryn Mawr ZIP code was home to 21,485 people with a median family income of $110,956.

== Education ==
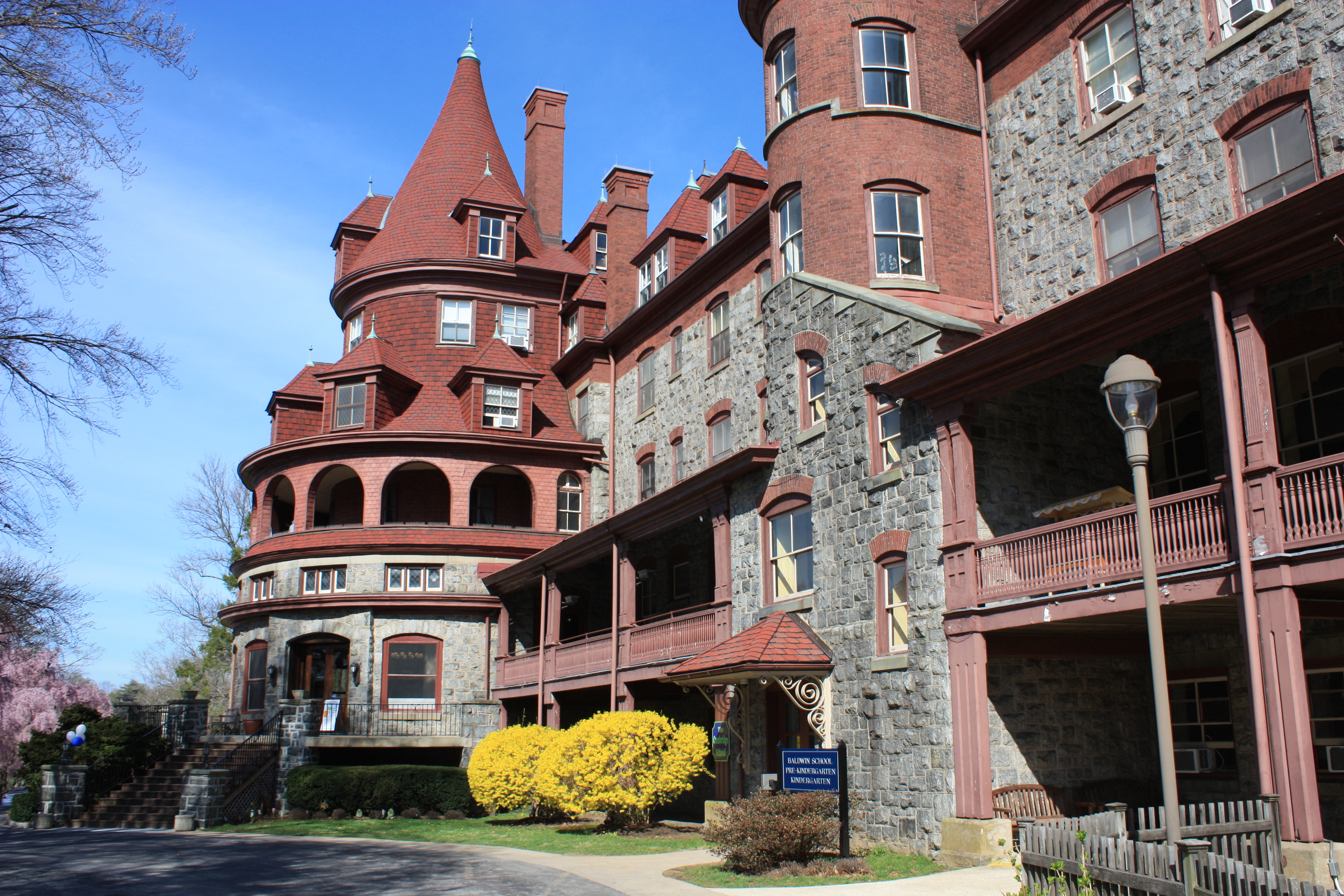
The Baldwin School

- Bryn Mawr residents of Lower Merion Township attend schools in the Lower Merion School District;
  - As of 2024 school zoning for the Lower Merion Township portion is as follows: Gladwyne Elementary School, Black Rock Middle School, and Harriton High School.
- Bryn Mawr residents of Radnor Township attend schools in the Radnor Township School District; Radnor High School is the district's sole high school.
- Bryn Mawr residents of Haverford Township attend schools in the School District of Haverford Township; Haverford High School is the district's sole high school.
- Sacred Heart Academy Bryn Mawr, the Shipley School and The Baldwin School are all located in Bryn Mawr. The French International School of Philadelphia, which opened in 1991, previously held its classes at Baldwin and then at Shipley.

== Points of interest ==
- Bryn Mawr College
- Harcum College
- Rosemont College
- Sacred Heart Academy Bryn Mawr
- Baldwin School
- Shipley School
- Barrack Hebrew Academy
- Clarke Schools for Hearing and Speech, formerly Clarke School for the Deaf. "Clarke Philadelphia" is located here, with its main campus being in Northampton, Massachusetts.
- American College Arboretum
- The American College of Financial Services
- Bryn Mawr Campus Arboretum
- Bryn Mawr Film Institute
- Harriton House
- The Main Point
- Bryn Mawr Hospital

== Notable people ==
- Julius Wesley Becton Jr., retired US Army general, former Federal Emergency Management Agency Director, and education administrator
- John Bogle, founder and former CEO of The Vanguard Group
- Avis Bohlen, U.S. Ambassador to Bulgaria (1996–1999)
- Derek Bok, lawyer, educator, president of Harvard University
- Neal Boortz, lawyer, broadcaster, U.S. Radio Hall of Fame
- Jordana Bryant, country/pop singer-songwriter
- Jake Cohen (born 1990), American-Israeli basketball player for Maccabi Tel Aviv and the Israeli national basketball team
- Meredith Colket, silver medalist in pole vault, 1900 Olympics
- Samuel Conway, chemist and Anthrocon chairman
- Fran Crippen, swimmer
- A. J. Croce, musician
- Kat Dennings, actress
- Gregg Diamond, musician / songwriter
- Mark DiFelice, former professional baseball player, Milwaukee Brewers
- Fred D'Ignazio, educator and technology writer
- Adelaide C. Eckardt, Maryland politician
- Edward Fishman, American diplomat and scholar
- Emmet French, golfer
- Phil Gosselin, Major League baseball player
- Philip A. Hart, US Senator from Michigan
- Merrill Kelly, Major League Baseball player for the Arizona Diamondbacks.
- Agathe Lasch, Jewish German linguist, first female professor of German studies at a German university, taught at Bryn Mawr College
- Edward Barnes Leisenring Jr., coal executive
- John Mais, two-time Olympic gymnast
- Daniel P. Mannix, author, The Fox and the Hound
- Jayne Mansfield, actress
- Walter A. McDougall, Pulitzer Prize winner
- Emmy Noether, mathematician, died in Bryn Mawr
- Michael A. O'Donnell, author, lecturer, and Episcopal priest, born here
- Richard A. O'Donnell, playwright, composer, lyricist, poet, actor, and stand-up comic
- R. C. Orlan, baseball player
- David W. Oxtoby, president of Pomona College
- Teddy Pendergrass, singer
- Chris Pikula, professional Magic: The Gathering player
- Elizabeth Plater-Zyberk, University of Miami professor of architecture and New Classical advocate
- Polly Platt, author of books for Americans living in France
- Happy Rockefeller, wife of Nelson Rockefeller, who was US vice president from 1974 to 1977
- Jake Schindler, professional poker player
- Beth Shak, professional poker player for Full Tilt
- Saleka Night Shyamalan, singer-songwriter and actress
- Jay Sigel, professional golfer, U.S. Amateur champion
- Ed Snider, founder of Comcast Spectacor
- John Spagnola, former professional football player
- Andrew Spence, artist
- Richard Swett, former congressman and diplomat
- Joseph Wright Taylor, industrialist, Quaker leader, founder and benefactor of Bryn Mawr College
- Jack Thayer, survivor of sinking of RMS Titanic
- M. Carey Thomas, second president of Bryn Mawr College
- Cheryl Abplanalp Thompson, Team USA handball player in 1996 Summer Olympics, inductee into Davis and Elkins College Hall of Fame
- Charles Thomson, secretary of Continental Congress, lived at Harriton House
- Ronne Troup, actress
- Emlen Tunnell, NFL player for New York Giants and Green Bay Packers, member of Pro Football Hall of Fame
- Stanley Whitney, painter
- Rake Yohn, chemist and TV personality
- Warren Zevon, musician
- Anthony Zinni, US Marine Corps general
