= Phipps Conservatory and Botanical Gardens =

Botanical garden in Pittsburgh, Pennsylvania, US

Coordinates: 40.438948°N 79.947705°W

- U.S. National Register of Historic Places
- City of Pittsburgh Historic Structure
- Pittsburgh Landmark – PHLF
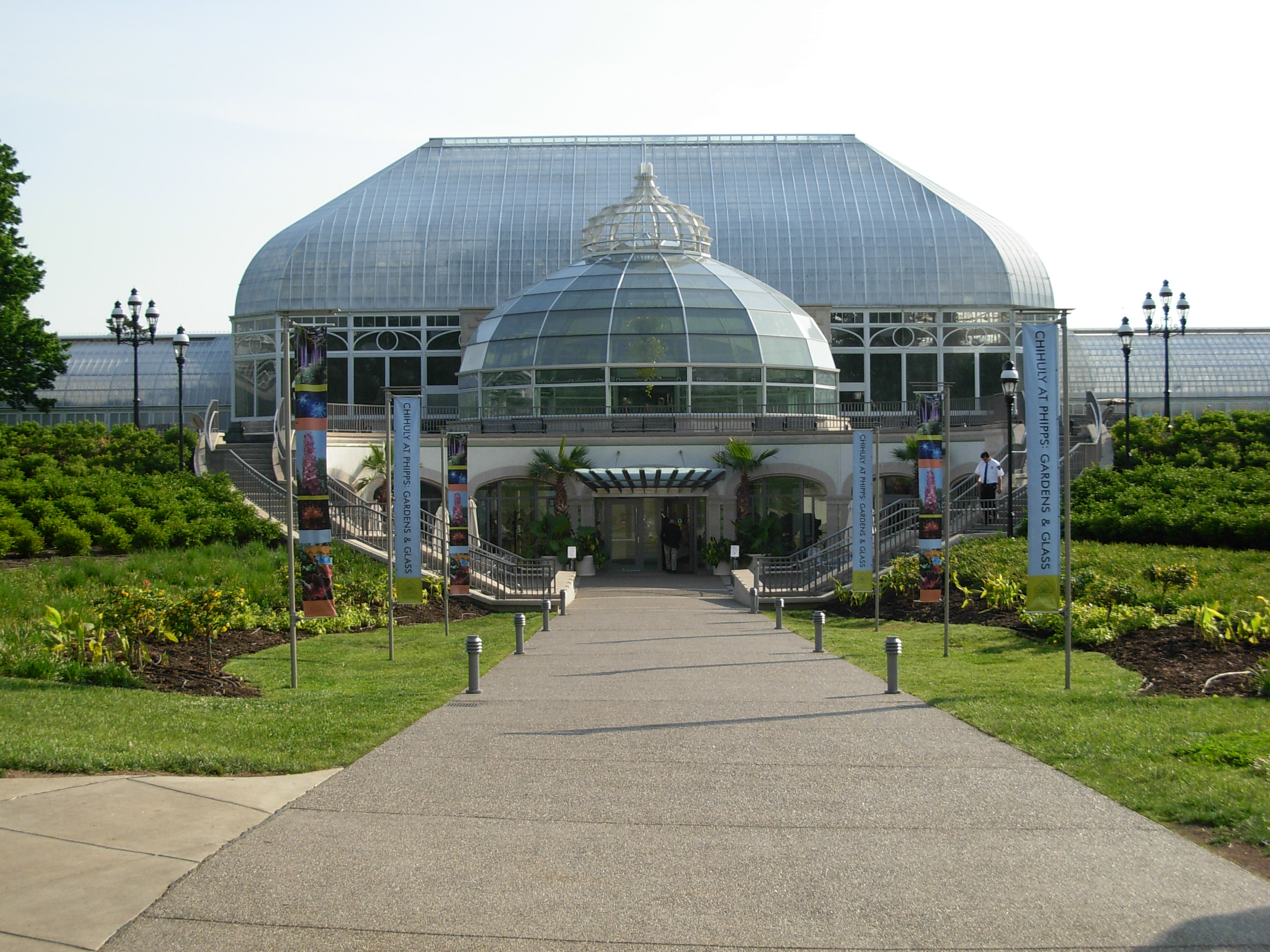
- Main entrance to Phipps Conservatory and Botanical Gardens
- Location: Pittsburgh, Pennsylvania
- Area: 15 acres (6.1 ha)
- Built: 1893
- Architect: Lord & Burnham
- Architectural style: Victorian greenhouse
- Website: Official website
- NRHP reference No.: 76001598

Significant dates
- Added to NRHP: November 13, 1976
- Designated CPHS: December 26, 1972
- Designated PHLF: 1970

Phipps Conservatory and Botanical Gardens is a botanical garden set in Schenley Park in Pittsburgh, Pennsylvania, United States. It is a City of Pittsburgh historic landmark and is listed on the National Register of Historic Places.

The gardens were founded in 1893 by steel and real-estate magnate Henry Phipps Jr. as a gift to the City of Pittsburgh. Its purpose is to educate and entertain the people of Pittsburgh with formal gardens (Roman, English, etc.) and various species of exotic plants (palm trees, succulents, bonsai, orchids, etc.). Currently, the facilities house elaborate gardens within the fourteen room conservatory itself and on the adjoining grounds. In addition to its primary flora exhibits, the sophisticated glass and metalwork of the Lord & Burnham conservatory offers an interesting example of Victorian greenhouse architecture.

Phipps is one of the "greenest" facilities in the world. The entrance pavilion of the Phipps Conservatory has silver-level LEED certification. Its greenhouse production facility has received Platinum certification, the first and only greenhouse to be so certified. Moreover, the Center for Sustainable Landscapes, designed to be as environmentally sustainable as possible, is also LEED Platinum certified, and produces all of its own energy.

== History ==
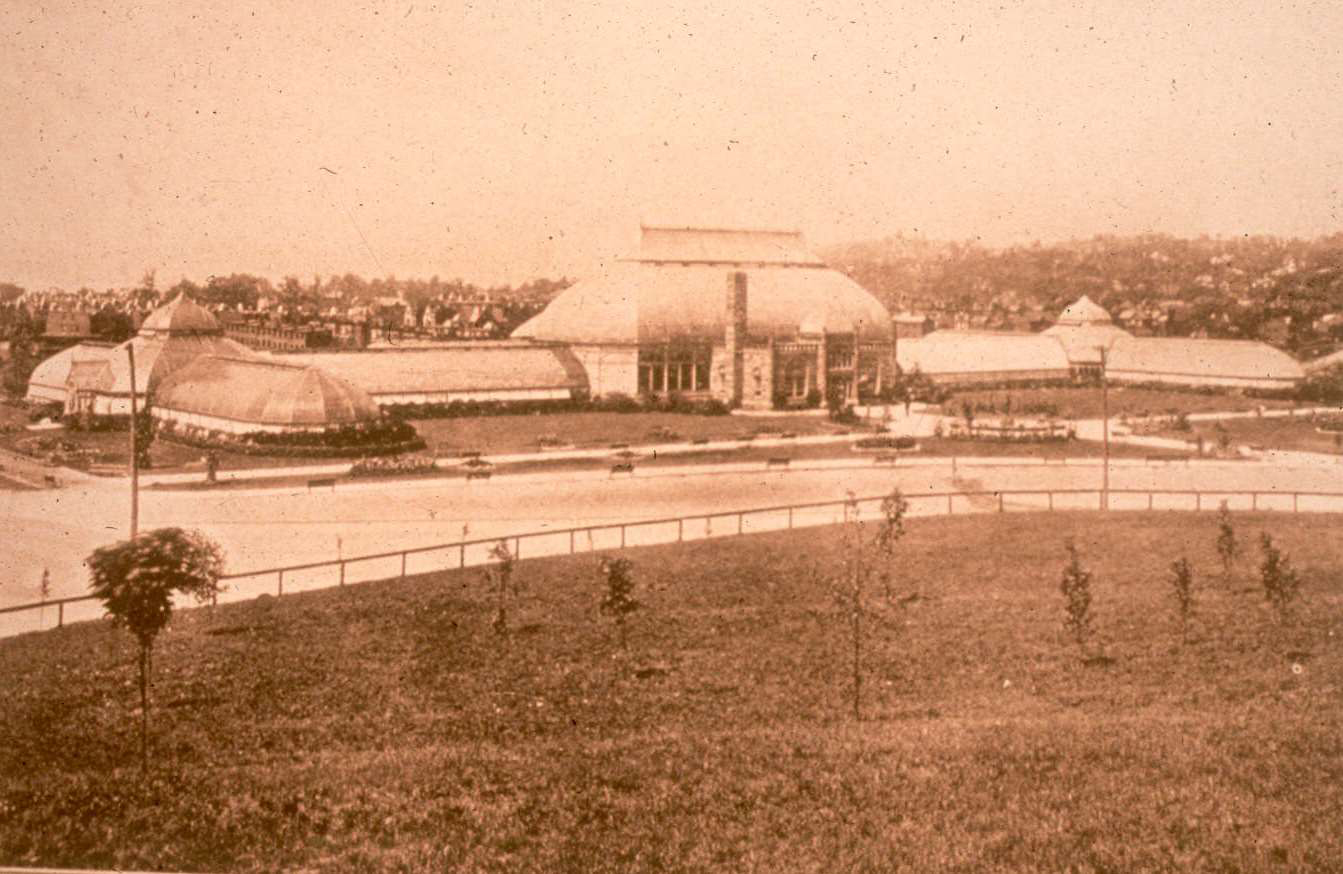
The Conservatory in 1893

The Phipps Conservatory was founded in 1893 as a gift from Henry Phipps Jr. to the City of Pittsburgh. The Conservatory was designed by Lord & Burnham, for a fee of $100,000. The glasshouse, then consisting of nine display rooms, was completed in August 1893, one year after construction began. On December 7, 1893, the Phipps Conservatory was opened to the public, displaying many plants from the World's Columbian Exposition in Chicago.

Sometime after 1910, the first of the Aquatic Gardens was built. A second pool would be installed in 1939. In 1970, the Conservatory was declared a Historic Landmark by the Pittsburgh History and Landmarks Foundation. In 1976, the Phipps Conservatory was added to the National Register of Historic Places. In 1993, the Phipps Conservatory, which had been run by the City of Pittsburgh since 1893, became a privately managed, while city owned, non-profit organization.

In October 2003, Phipps announced an expansion project. The first phase, a green engineered Welcome Center topped by a neo-Victorian dome, was designed by IKM Incorporated, and completed in 2005. The Production Greenhouses and a Tropical Forest Conservatory were completed in 2006.

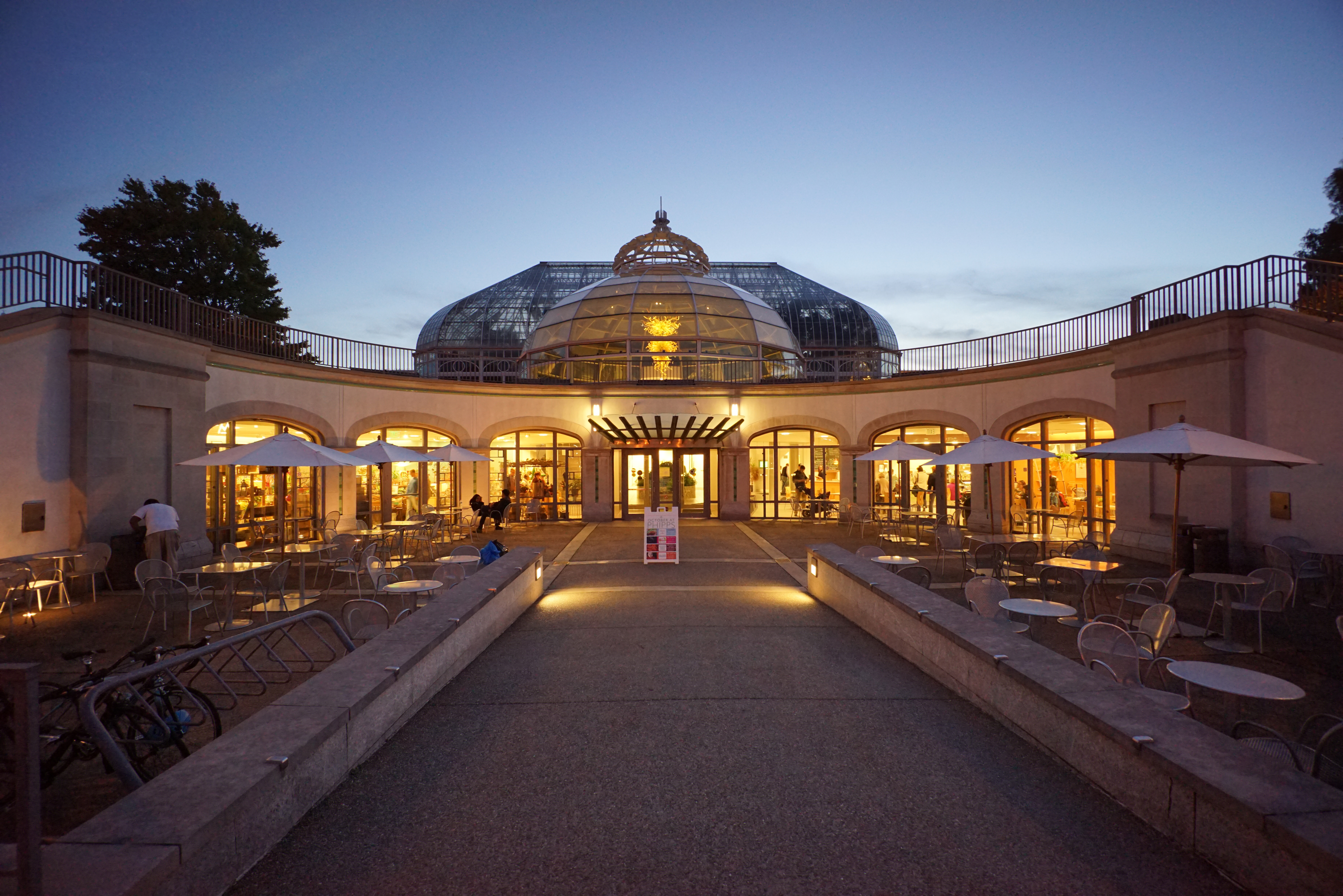
The Welcome Center, completed in 2005, features a neo-Victorian dome illuminated by a Chihuly chandelier.

The Tropical Forest conservatory has a different theme every three years, beginning with the country of Thailand. In addition to a "Research Forest Station" and a "Healer's Hut" (designed to educate visitors about various cultural topics), there are two waterfalls, several bridges, a stream, and a wide variety of plants from bamboo, orchids and frangipani to plants of economic, cultural, and horticultural value to the people of Thailand. The second theme is "Headwaters of the Amazon," which opened in early 2009.

In 2007, Phipps teamed with glass artist Dale Chihuly and his Tacoma-based team of glass blowers. They worked together to create a marriage of hand-blown glass and living plants. Following the closing of the exhibit in February, the conservatory retained four prominent pieces (the Welcome Center chandelier, the hanging gold star in the Desert Room, the celadon and purple gilded Fiori in the Tropical Fruit and Spice Room and the bronze, apricot and chartreuse Ikebana in the Palm Court) and subsequently purchased 26 smaller pieces for its permanent collection including six multicolored Macchia (wavy, shell-like bowls), thirteen amber Cattails and seven Paintbrushes, all of which are installed in the Palm Court. The total Chihuly collection is valued at $1.2 million.

In 2009, Phipps teamed with another glass artist Hans Godo Frabel to create another stunning exhibit titled "Gardens and Glass." Unlike the Chihuly pieces, Frabel's work is more realistic, although still whimsical at times. Highlights of this exhibit include Longfellows, intricate glass orchid and lotus plants and various clowns (balancing on either glass playing cards or colored glass balls.) This collaboration was on display until January 2010.

== Indoor Gardens ==
=== Palm Court ===
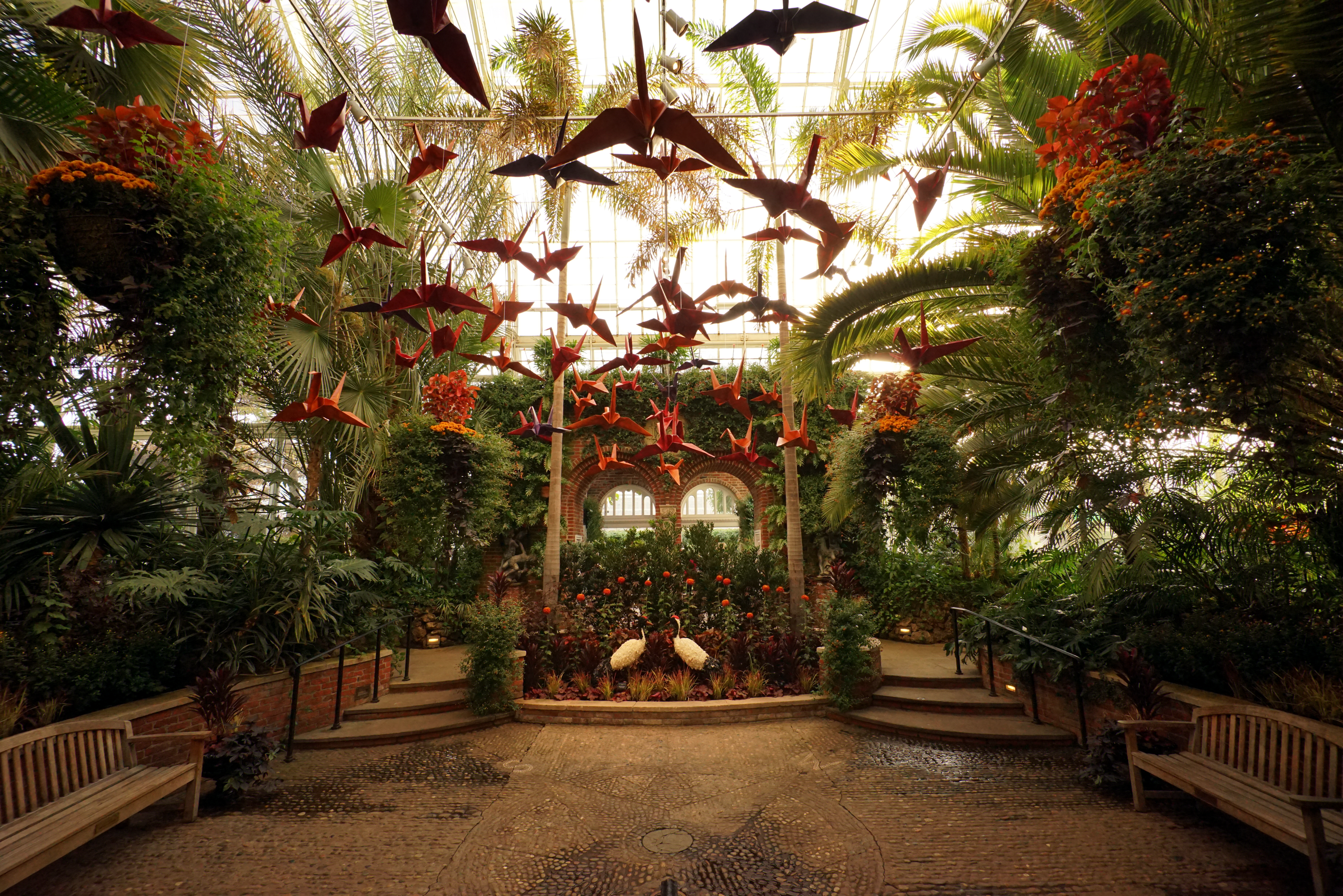
Paper cranes on display in the Palm Court

The Palm Court is the first room visitors see after entering the Conservatory through the main entrance. The Victorian-inspired room contains many species of palm trees. The room contains the original dated plaque from the Conservatory's opening as well as numerous glass installations by Dale Chihuly. To accommodate the palm trees, the Palm Court has a high glass peak.

The original wood and annealed glass in the Palm Court had deteriorated to a point for the need of emergency stabilization in 2008. Renovations began in 1992 and included replacing the upper wood and glass vent sash with aluminum and safety glass, and replacing the vertical wood and glass components with new replicated aluminum extrusions and safety glass glazing to match the original specifications exactly.

=== Serpentine Room ===
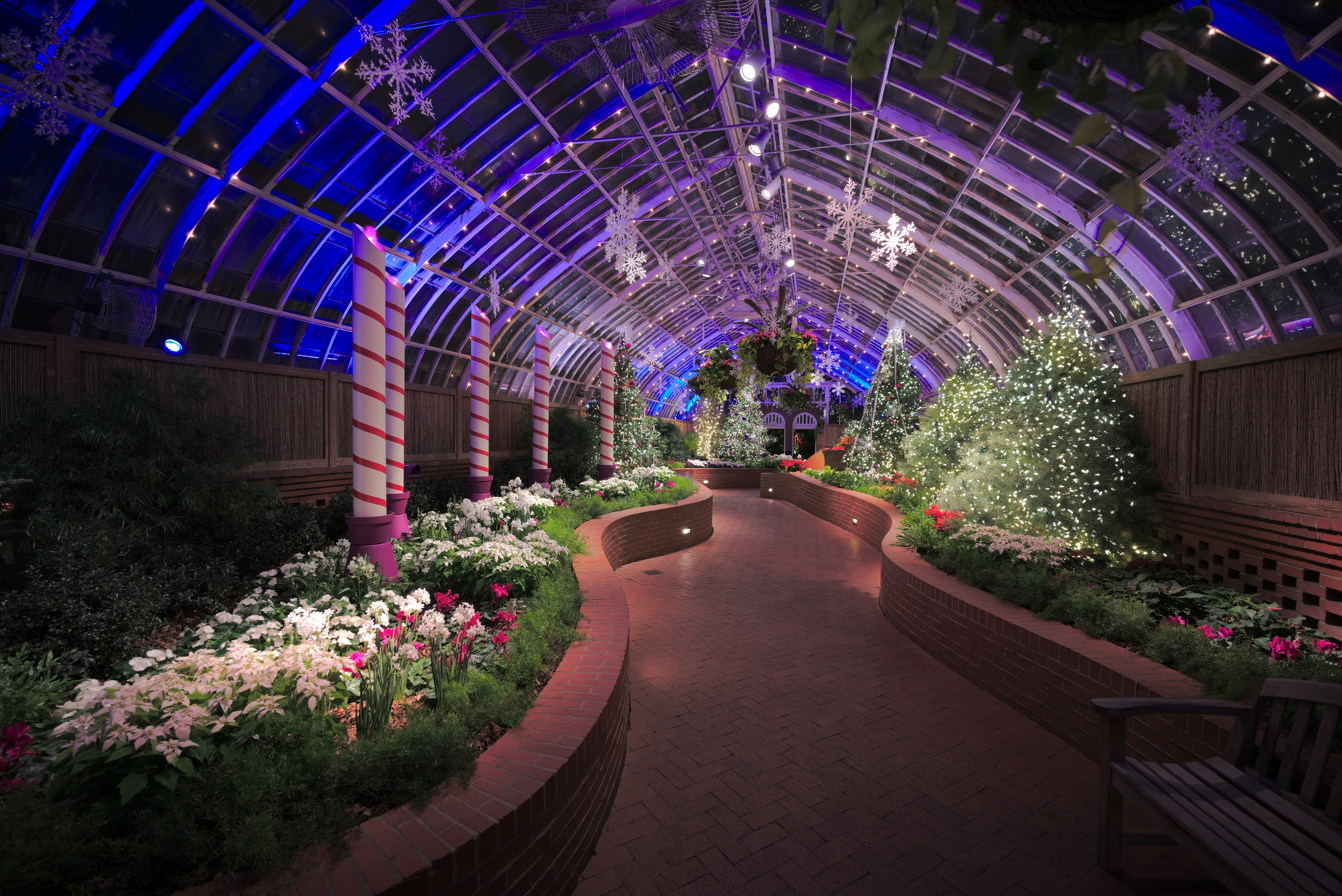
The Serpentine Room during the winter flower show

The Serpentine Room is located west of the Palm Court, connecting it to the Fern Room. The exhibits in the room change with the season for different shows and special exhibits. The room is named for its curved brick-walled pathway. Plants are lined along either side of the pathway, as well as suspended from the peaked ceiling.

The room was originally known as the Border Garden, which was redesigned as the present-day Serpentine Room during an 18-month period of extensive renovations starting in 1978.

=== Fern Room ===
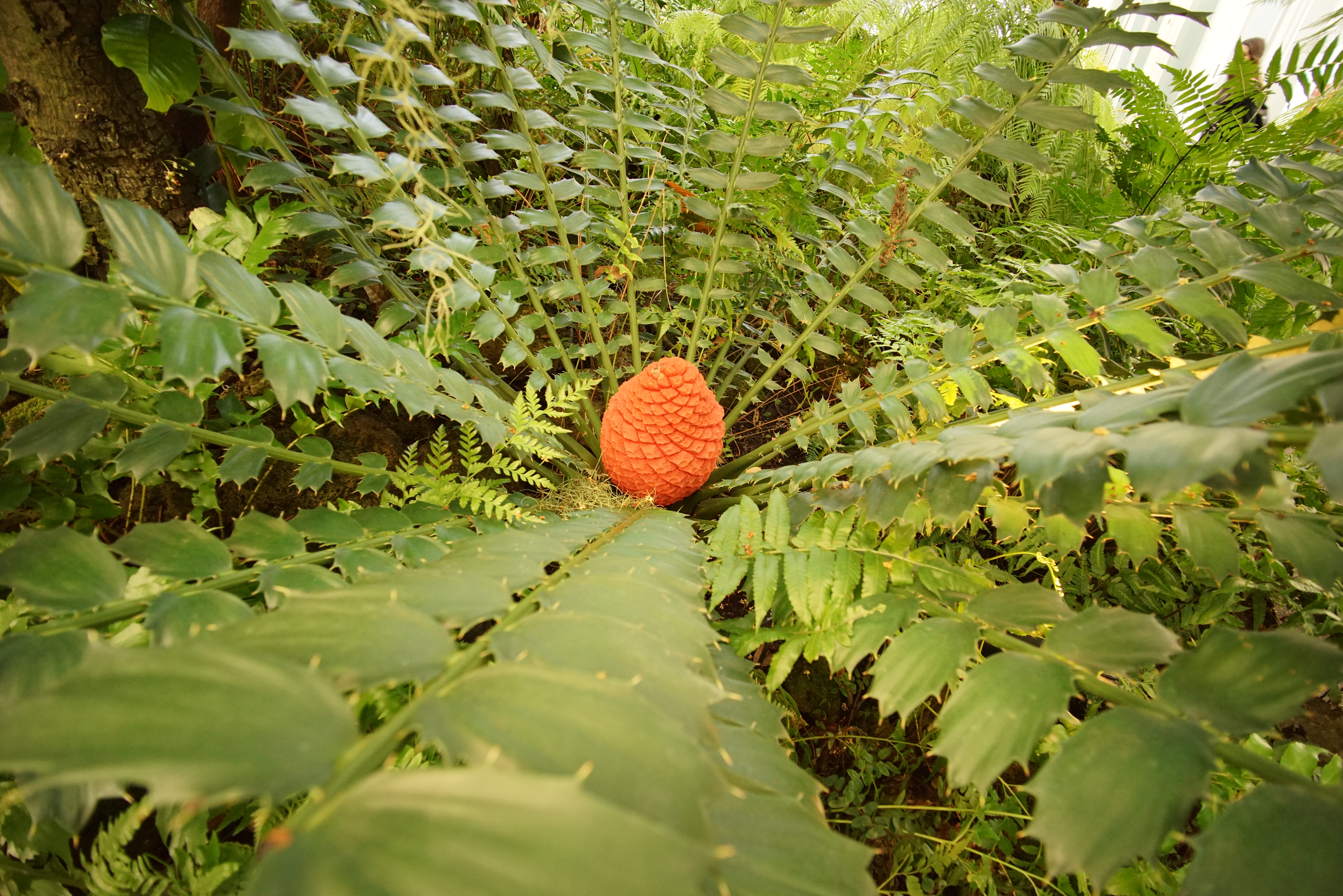
Encephalartos ferox in the Fern Room. It produces a large red cone once every five or six years.

The Fern Room is located in the west wing at the intersection of the Serpentine Room, the Orchid Room, and the Stove Room. The room contains many ferns, as well as cycads and other ground plants on which ferns commonly grow. The dominant species in the room are representative of the Triassic, during which ferns and cycads were common as flowering plants would not evolve until millennia later. Some species include Munch's cycad, Eastern Cape cycad, Zululand cycad, Queen sago, Staghorn fern, Australian tree fern, Tasmanian tree fern, tongue fern, bear's paw fern, and rabbit foot's fern.

=== Orchid Room ===
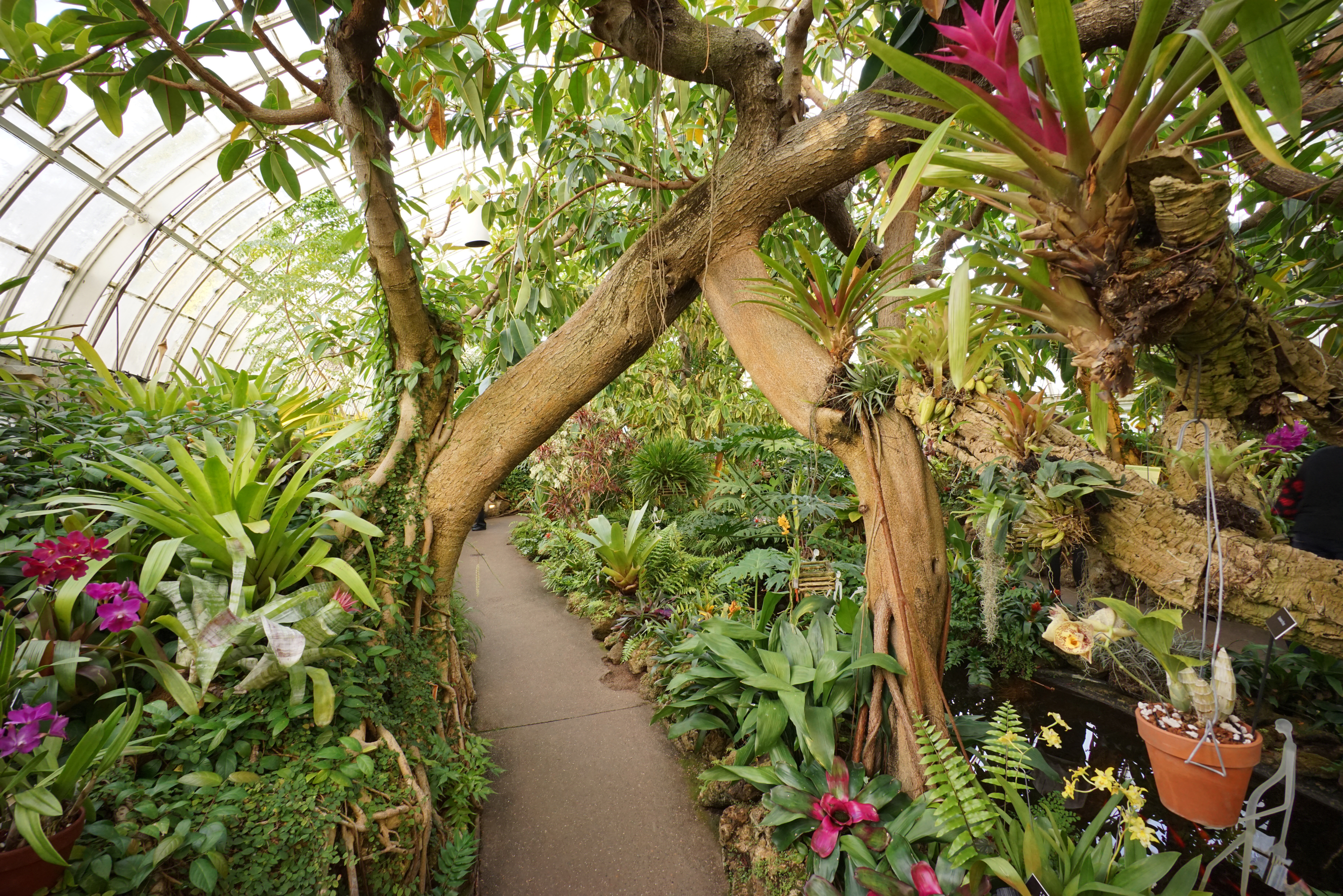
The Orchid Room

The Orchid Room is located in the north part of the west wing. The room contains many orchids. This includes the miniature orchids and the Barbara Tisherman Slipper Orchid Collection, curated in collaboration with the Orchid Society of Western Pennsylvania. Also on display is the unique Phalaenopsis Frank Sarris orchid, named for the founder of Sarris Candies, a trustee and benefactor of the Conservatory.

The room originated with a donation of 800 rare orchids in 1931 from Charles D. Armstrong, owner of the Armstrong Cork Company. The orchids were then valued at $50,000.

=== Stove Room ===
The Stove Room is located in the south part of the west wing. The plants in the room are representative of the deep tropics, and the room is maintained at a temperature of 80 °F (27 °C) during the day and 70 °F (21 °C) during the night.

=== South Conservatory ===
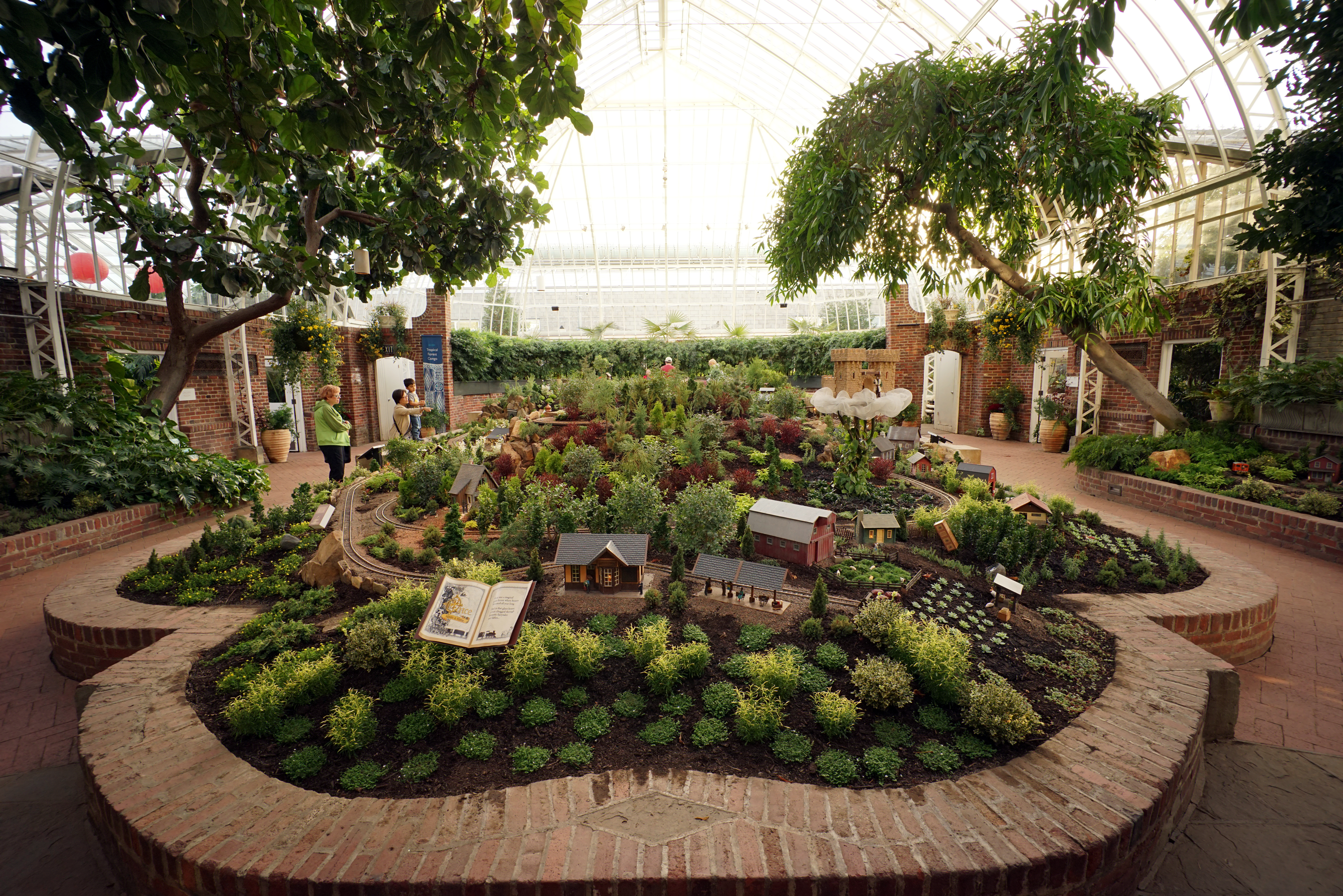
The fall Garden Railroad exhibit in the South Conservatory

The South Conservatory is located south of the Palm Court. The room houses seasonal flower shows. Since 1999, during fall and winter months, the room transforms into the Garden Railroad exhibit, in which miniature trains wind among a variety of small plants.

Originally called the Economic Room, the South Conservatory was built between 1896 and 1897 as a gift from Henry Phipps. It was then remodelled in the 1930s, during which time the room was partitioned to separate the Gallery and Tropical Fruit and Spice rooms.

=== Tropical Fruit and Spice Room ===
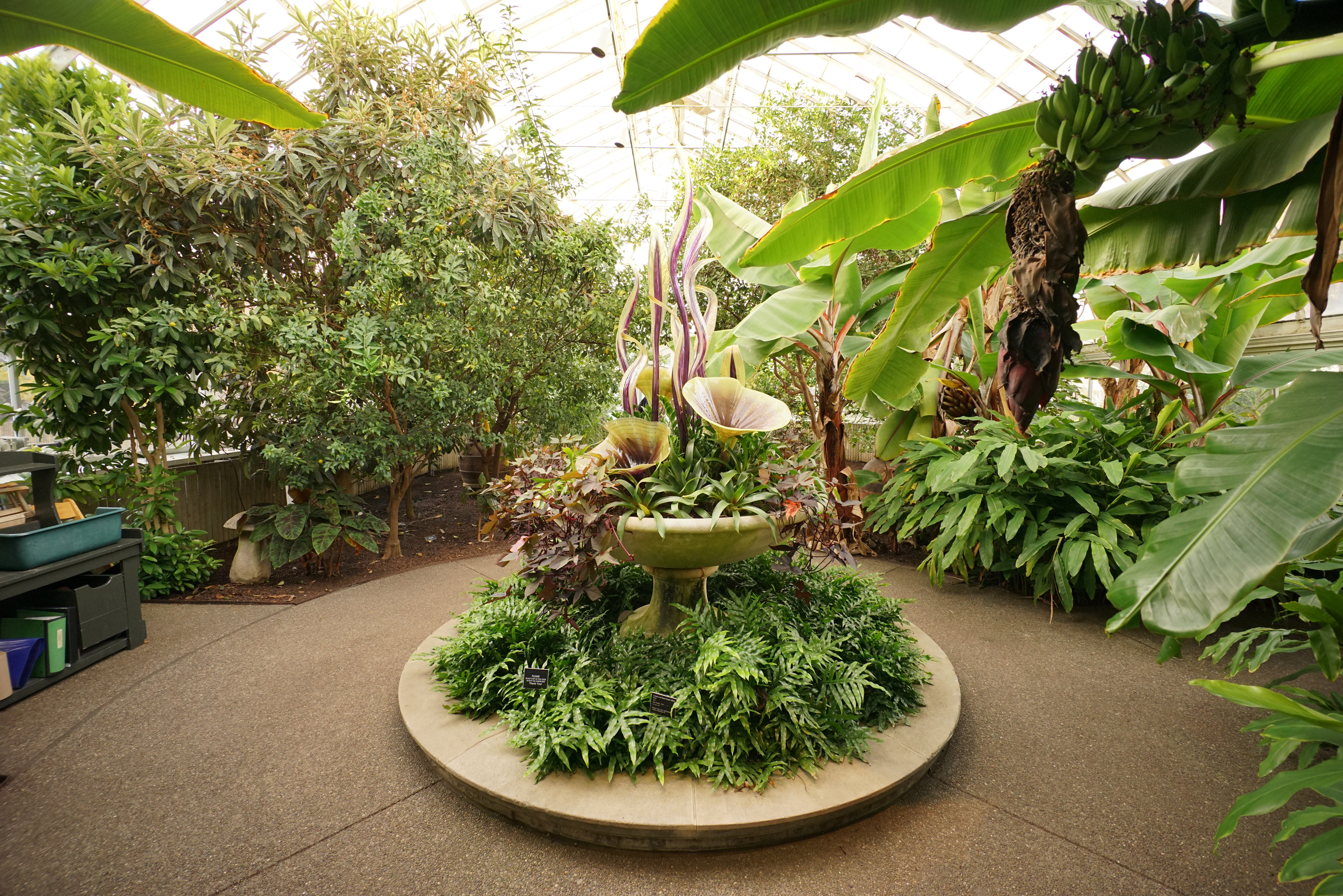
The tropical fruit and spice room

The Tropical Fruit and Spice Room is located west of the South Conservatory. The room contains tropical and sub-tropical fruits, nuts, and spices such as citrus fruits, bananas, allspice, papayas, cinnamon and coffee. The marble basin in the center of the room features a Dale Chihuly glass sculpture in purple and celadon.

=== Tropical Forest Conservatory ===
The Tropical Forest Conservatory, located south of the South Conservatory, is the largest indoor display area of the conservatory. The room features a different region every three years, and contains man-made waterfalls, winding pathways, a fish pond, and interactive learning stations. It is also the site of many of the public programs and special events at the Conservatory. As of 2015, the region features the Tropical Forest Congo exhibit.

The Tropical Forest Conservatory opened on December 6, 2006. The Tropical Forest Conservatory has several interesting features, which make it extremely energy-efficient. It has "earth tubes" running underground to help cool the tropical forest and a solid oxide fuel cell, which efficiently produces 5 kW of electricity from natural gas. In addition, there are computer-controlled shades that block excess sunlight from entering the structure and also help to insulate it at night. The roof is also computer-controlled and many of the glass panes can be opened.

History of exhibits:

2006 - Thailand

2009 - Peru

2012 - India

2015 - Congo

2018 - Cuba

2022 - Hawaii

2025 - Panama

=== Gallery Room ===
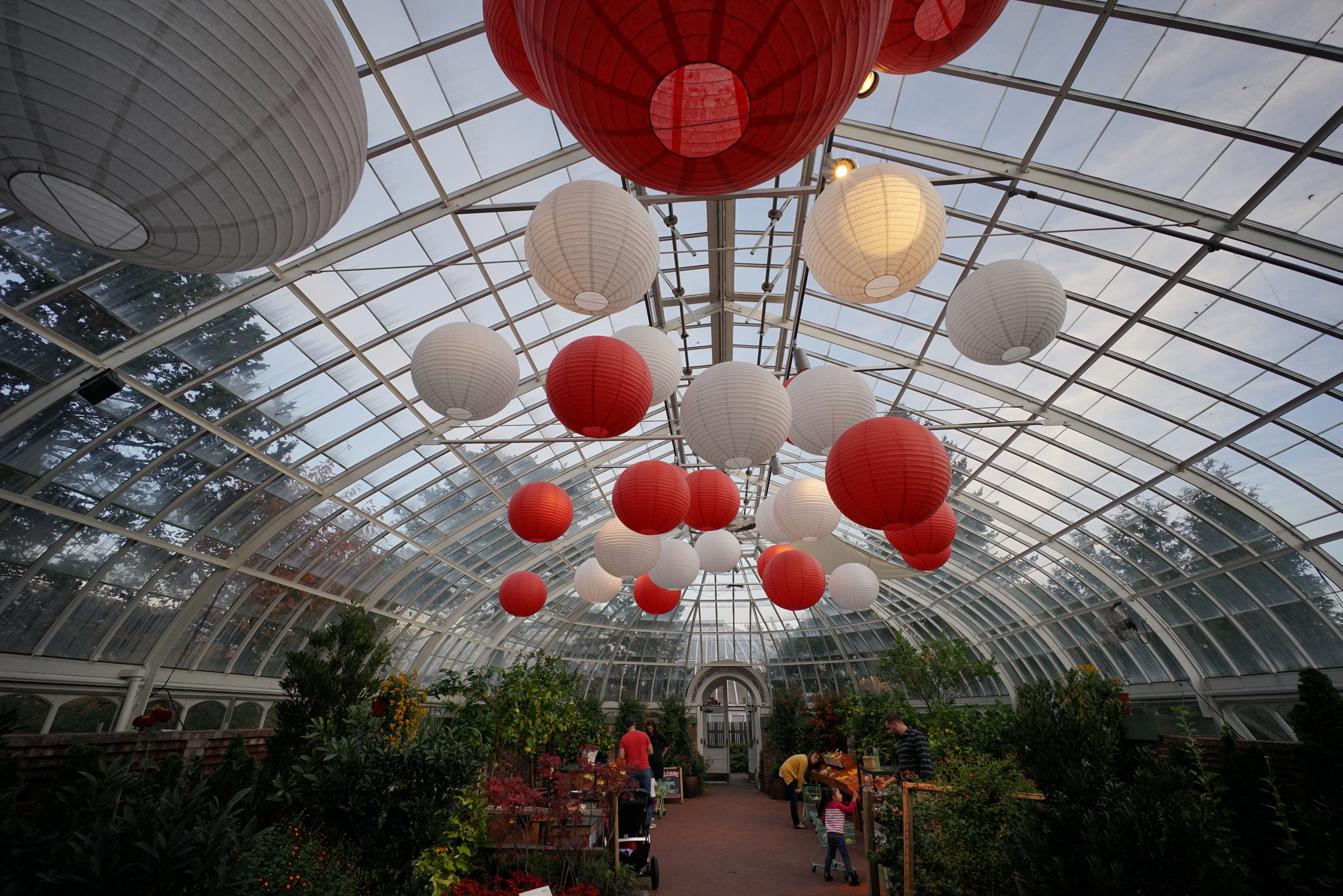
The farmer's market at the Gallery Room

The Gallery Room is located east of the South Conservatory. The room contains didactic displays for children, such as the imaginary farmer's market, where children can play and learn about healthy food.

In the 1950s and 1960s, the room was known as the Modern Room, and featured contemporary room and garden scenes.

=== Sunken Garden ===
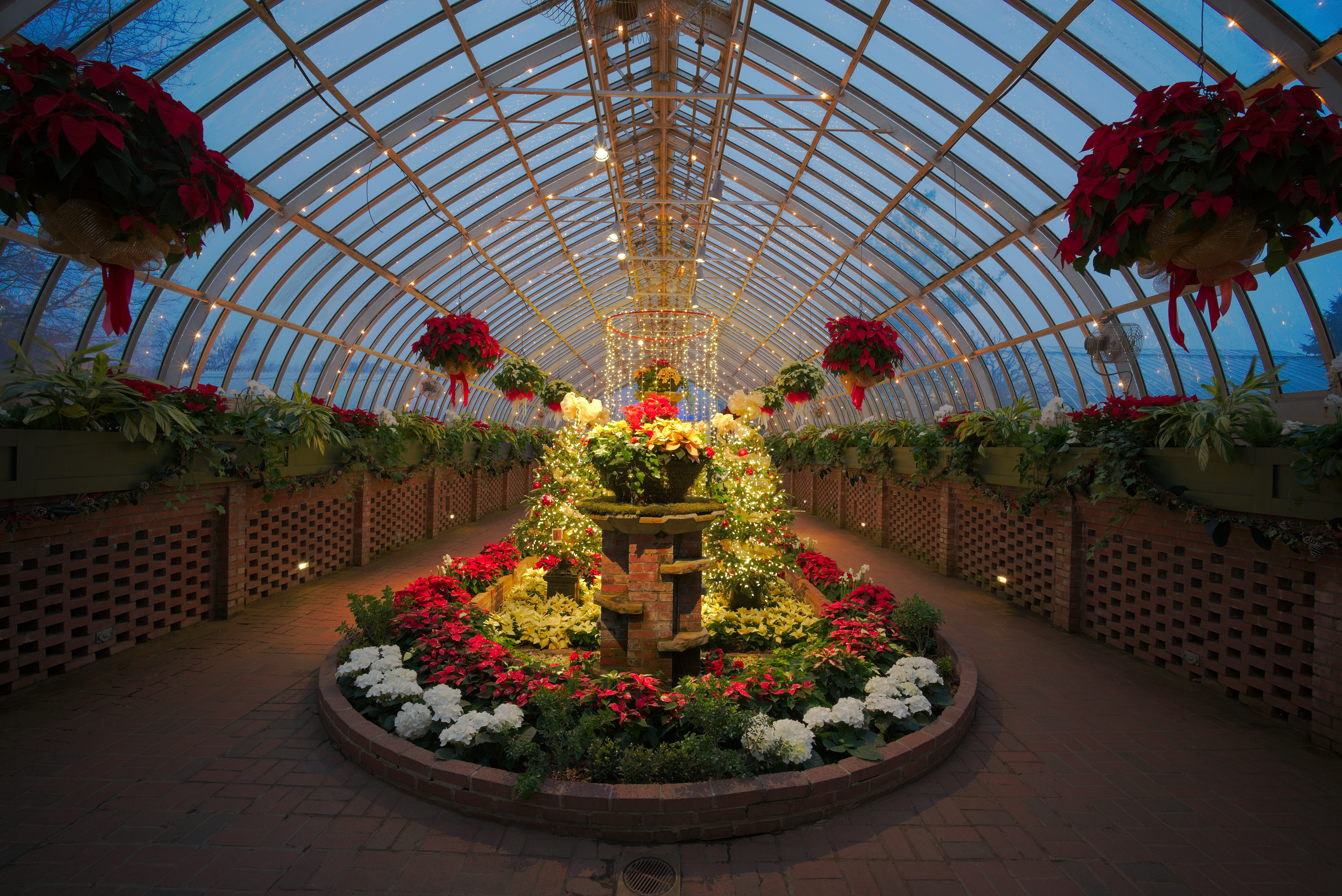
The Sunken Garden during the winter flower show

The Sunken Garden is located east of the Palm Court, connecting it to the Victoria Room. The room is furnished with fountains, hanging baskets, and sunken beds. The plants in the room vary with season. The room has changed several times over the decades. It has been known, at different times, as the Cascade Garden featuring a modern cascading waterfall; the Charleston Garden featuring an antebellum-themed display with a Southern mansion façade; and, more recently, a Japanese-style garden.

=== Desert Room ===
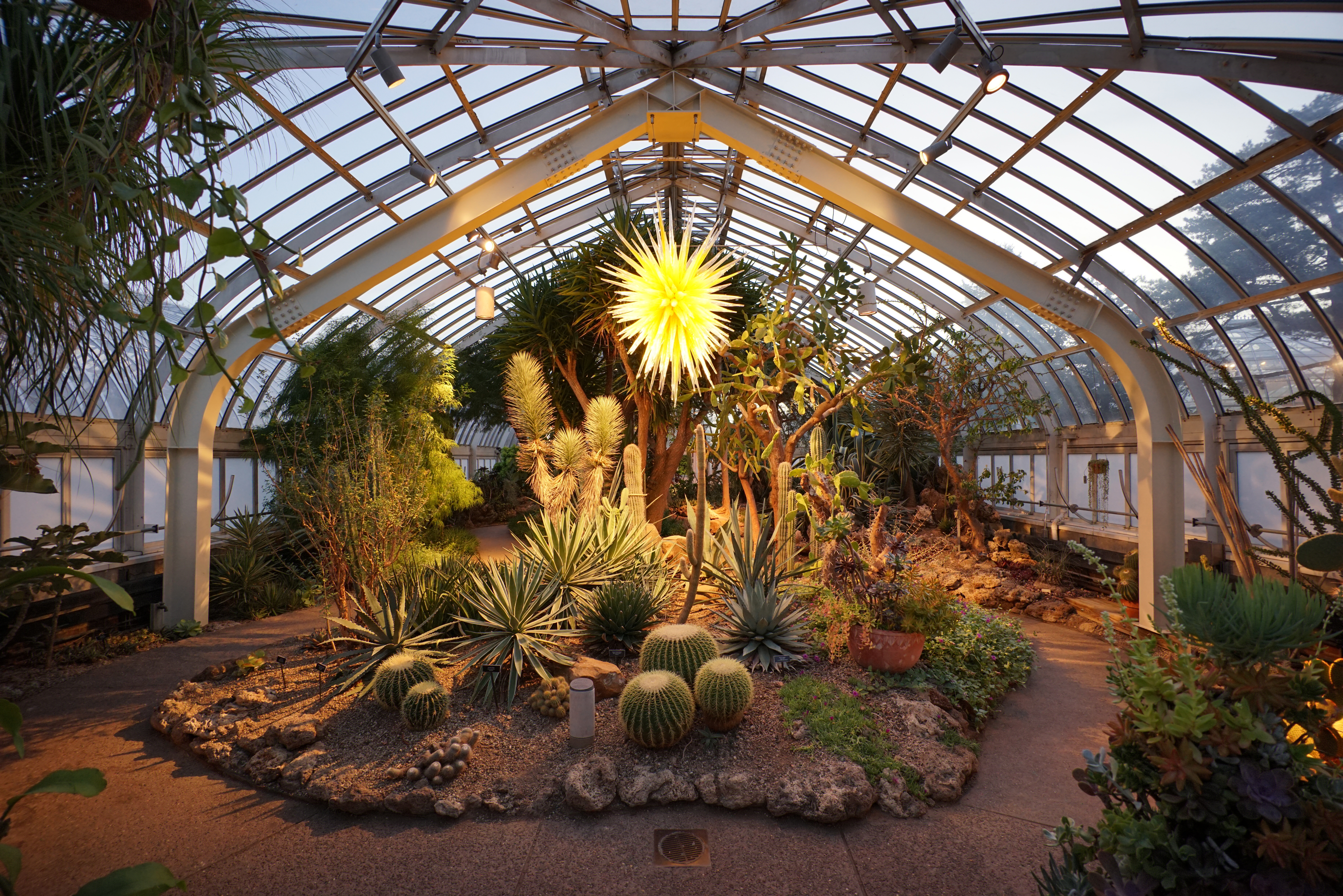
The Desert Room

The Desert Room is located south of the Sunken Garden. The room contains plant life that thrive in a desert climate, such as cacti and other succulent plants. A glass chandelier named Desert Gold Star by Dale Chihuly can also be found in the room. Some species include the Joshua tree, saguaro, palo verde, fire barrels, cape aloe, tortoise shell plant, bushman poison bulb, African tree grape, sunrise tequila agave, and shaving brush tree.

The Desert Room opened in 1902 as the Cacti House. When it first opened, guests could only look at the display garden over a terrace. In the late 1930s, the room was redesigned so that visitors could walk through it.

=== Victoria Room ===
The Victoria Room is located in the east wing, connecting the Broderie Room, the East Room, and the Sunken Garden. The room features a large central pond containing an interactive fountain.

=== Broderie Room ===
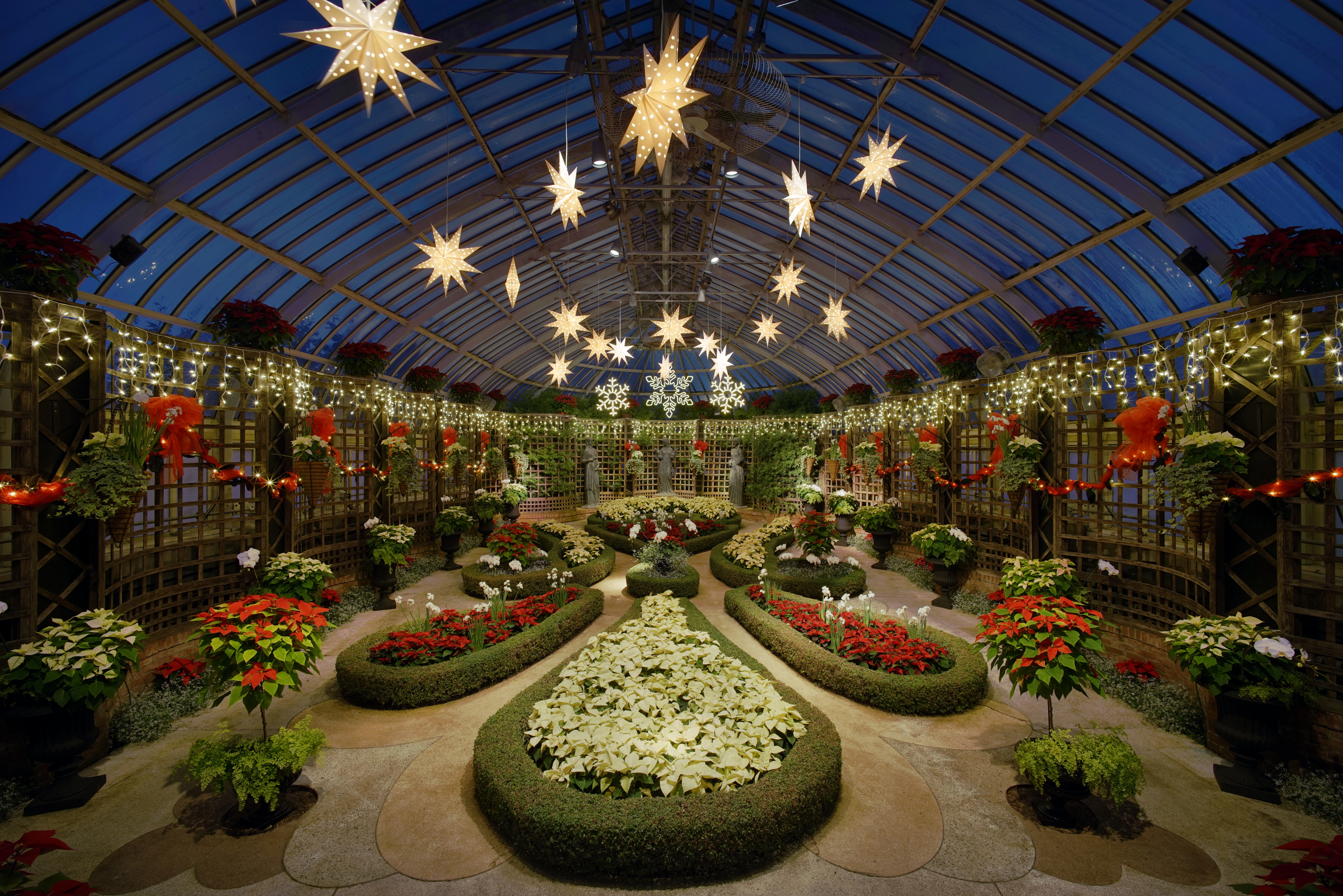
The Broderie Room during the winter show.

The Broderie Room, also known as the Parterre de Broderie which translates to "flowerbed of embroidery", is located in the south part of the east wing. The garden is modelled after the formal gardens of French chateaux during the reign of Louis XIV, and is a popular setting for wedding ceremonies and photo shoots. The room opened in 1939 and was originally called the Cloister Garden. In 1966, the room was redesigned as the present-day Broderie Room.

=== East Room ===
The East Room is located in the north part of the east wing. The room contains streams and waterfalls. The displays change with season.

== Outdoor Gardens ==
=== Rooftop Edible Garden ===
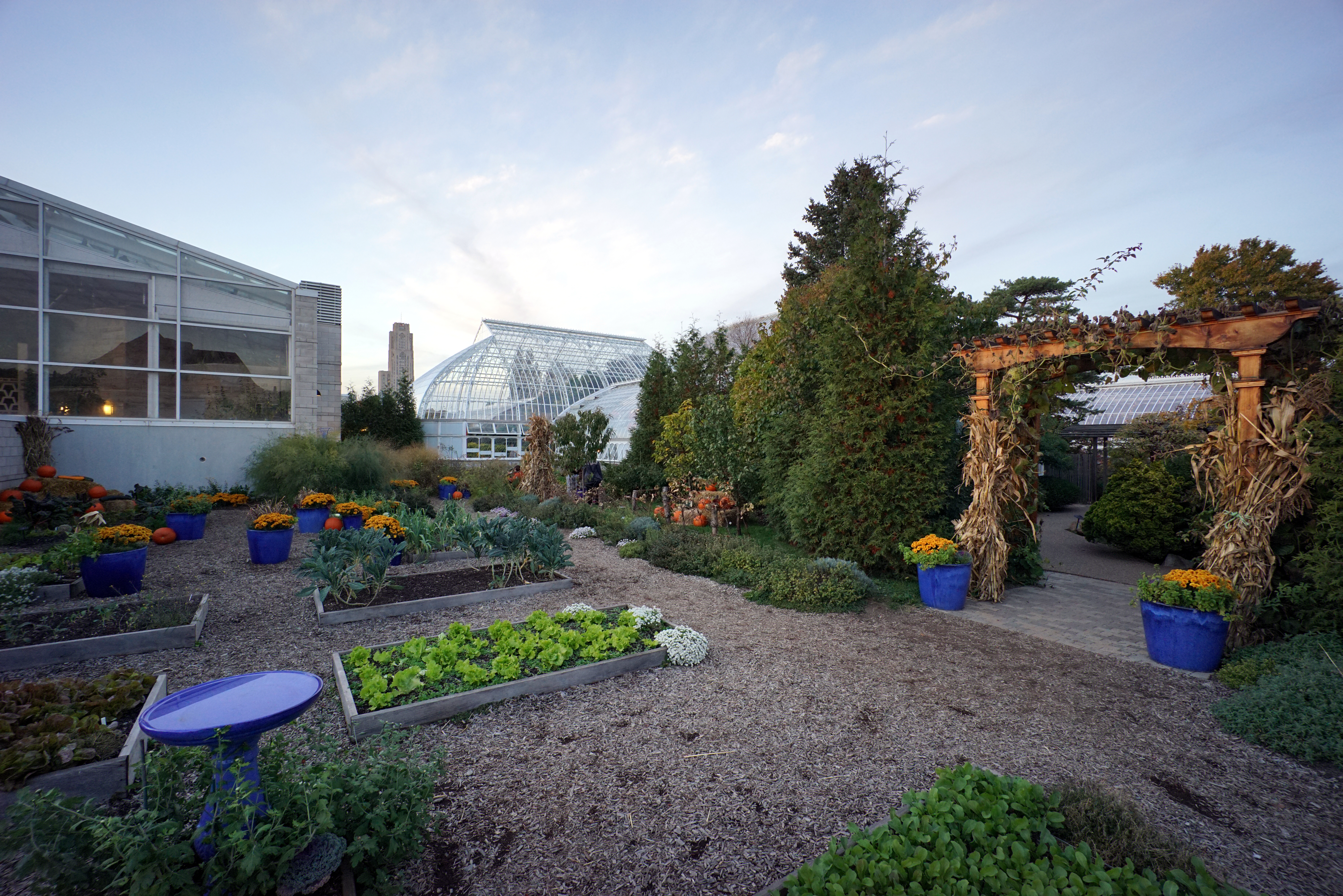
The Rooftop Edible Garden

The Rooftop Edible Garden is located between the Desert Room and the Tropical Forest Conservatory. It contains several edible vegetables and fruits. The outdoor demonstration space produces fresh produce for the cafeteria in the Welcome Center and serves as a site of hands-on learning for children's camps and youth programs.

=== Japanese Courtyard Garden ===
The Japanese Courtyard Garden is located between the Desert Room and the Gallery Room. It contains a Japanese garden and several bonsai. The Garden was installed in 1991 and was designed by Hoichi Kurisu.

=== Children's Discovery Garden ===
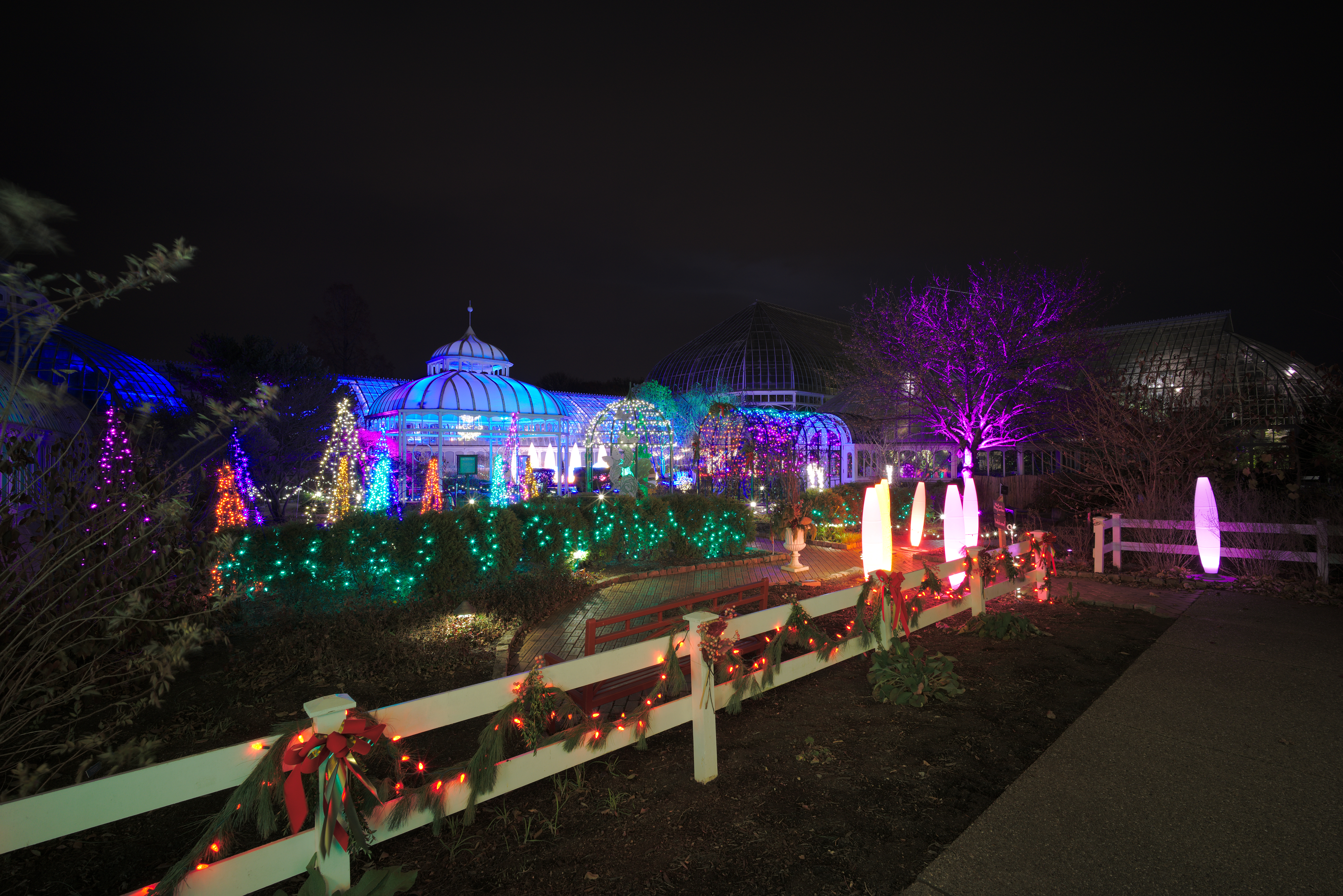
Discovery Garden during the winter 2015 light show

The Children's Discovery Garden is located between the Stove Room and the Tropical Spices room. The Garden contains areas designed to attract birds, butterflies, and bees. It also includes a bog garden, a sensory garden, and various outdoor spaces to entertain and educate children.

=== Outdoor Garden ===
The Outdoor Garden is located to the northwest of the main building complex. The garden contains many smaller gardens and plant collections, including an herb garden, a medicinal garden, perennials, ferns and dwarf conifers.

The original hardscape was constructed by Works Progress Administration in 1935 and persists to this day. The garden was originally known as the Perennial Garden, which was transformed into the Outdoor Garden in 1986.

=== Botany Hall ===
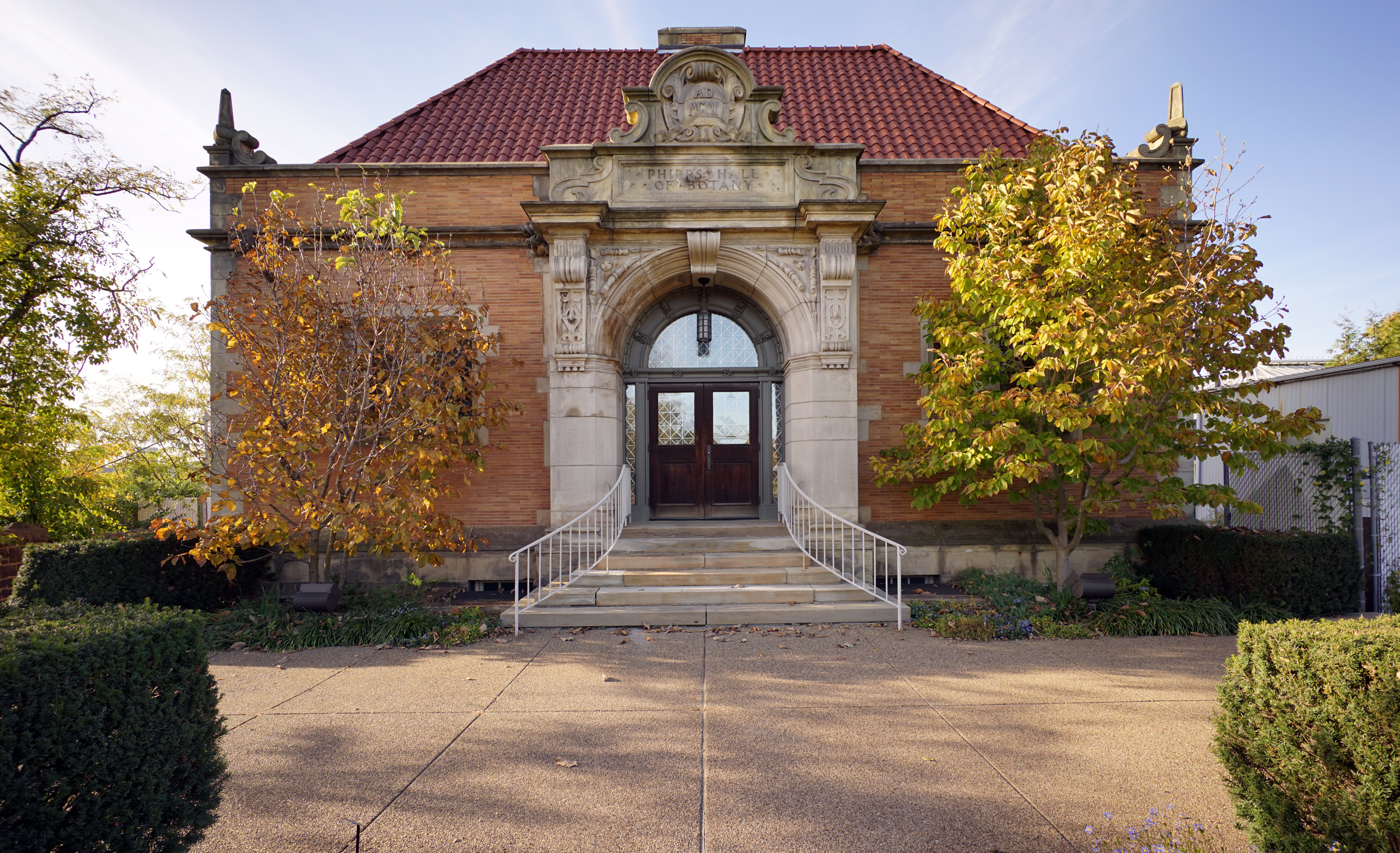
The Phipps Hall of Botany

The Botany Hall, across from Panther Hollow Bridge, features a small garden containing walkways, curved benches, and a fountain. The Botany Hall was funded, in 1901, by Henry Phipps to be used by local teachers looking to enhance class trips to the glasshouse. It was renovated in the late 1990s and continues to serve as a site for many educational programs and events.

=== Aquatic Garden ===
The Aquatic garden is located on the east side of the Conservatory outside of the Victoria Room. During the summer, the two pools are filled with tropical water plants and floating flora. One of the pools features a statue of Neptune, the Roman god of the sea, which was presented to Phipps shortly after the conservatory opened in 1893. The northern pool was constructed sometime between 1910 and 1915, and the southern one was added in 1939.

== Center for Sustainable Landscapes ==
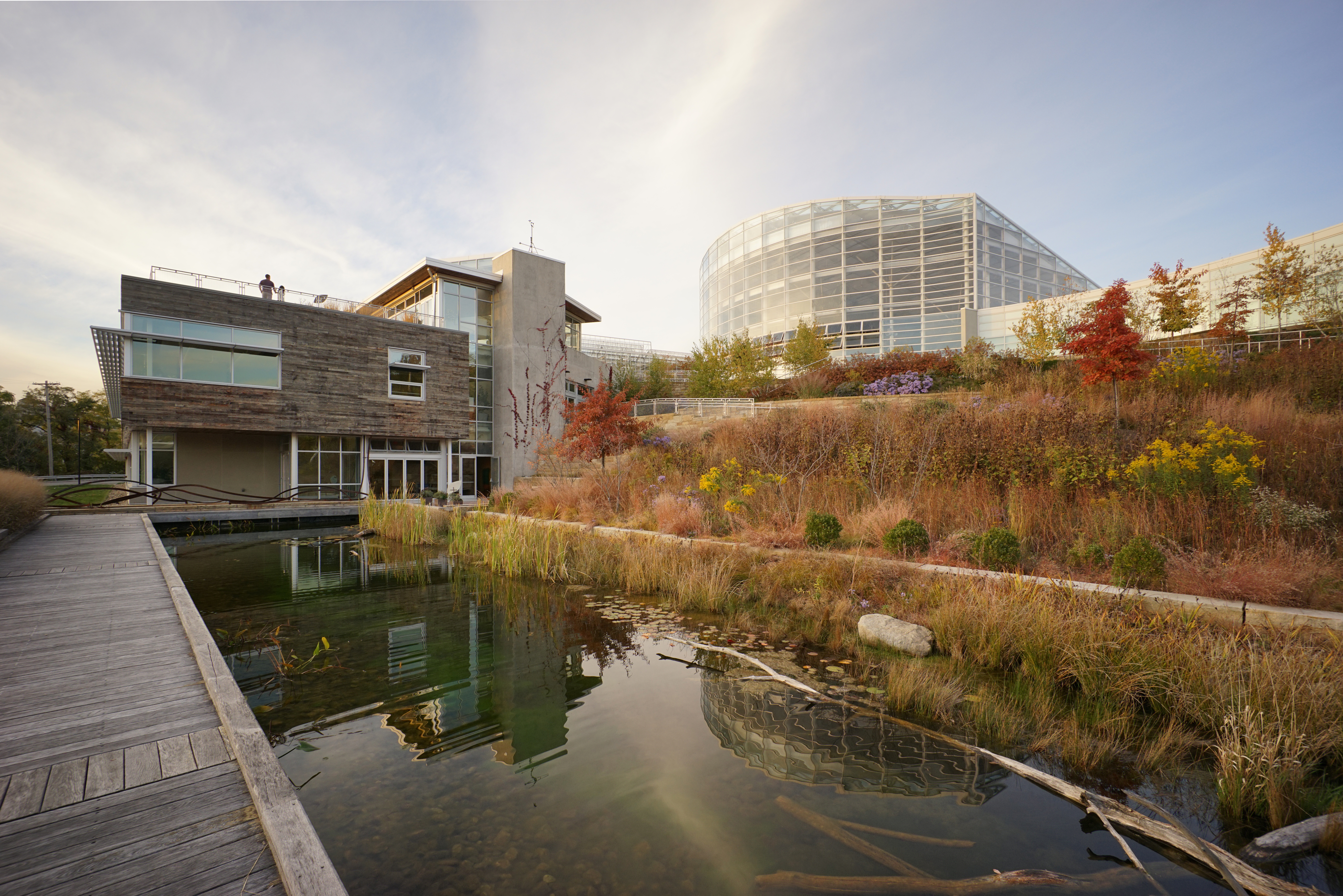
Water capture and treatment at the Center for Sustainable Landscapes

The Center for Sustainable Landscapes (CSL) is a building on the Conservatory grounds, located south of the Tropical Forest Conservatory, that is designed to be environmentally sustainable. Opened in December 2012, the building produces all of its own energy and treats and reuses all water captured on site. The exhibits in the building include informational signs, an interactive kiosk, and art exhibits. The building also contains a classroom for children.

The CSL has received a Platinum LEED certification along with fulfilling the Living Building Challenge for net-zero energy, Additionally, the CSL is the first and only building to receive Four Stars Sustainable SITES Initiative certification for landscaping projects. These honors and certifications make the CSL one of the 'greenest' buildings in the world.

== See also ==
- List of botanical gardens and arboretums in Pennsylvania
