= Marion Eames =

British writer (1921–2007)

Marion Eames (born Gwladys Marion Griffith Eames, 5 February 1921 – 3 April 2007) was a Welsh novelist writing mainly in Welsh. She was also a talented musician.

== Biography ==
Marion was born in Birkenhead, Cheshire, of Welsh parents – William Griffith Eames (1885–1959) and his wife Gwladys Mary (née Jones) (1891–1979) – but she was brought up from the age of four at Dolgellau, Merionethshire (Sir Feirionnydd), where she attended Dr Williams' School. A talented musician, who played the harp and the piano, she graduated from the Guildhall School of Music and Drama in London.

Marion worked as a librarian in Dolgellau, then at Aberystwyth University, before becoming a radio producer with the BBC in Cardiff from 1955 to 1980. She also served for a time as a regional organizer for the political party Plaid Cymru. In 1955 she married the Quaker journalist Griffith Williams, with whom she moved to Pimlico, then back to Cardiff.

Eames was an early scriptwriter for the long-running Welsh soap Pobol Y Cwm. Her best-known work of fiction is the historical novel Y Stafell Ddirgel (1969), which was translated into English by Margaret Phillips as The Secret Room (1975). This was later adapted as a BBC television drama series, and has been reprinted in both languages.

Other works by Eames include I hela cnau (1978, in English: The Golden Road, 1990). A sequel to Y Stafell Ddirgel was Y Rhandir Mwyn (The Fair Wilderness). Marion Eames was awarded an honorary degree of the University of Wales. Some of her works were for children: Sionyn a Siarli (1978), Huw a'r Adar Aur (1987), and Y Tir Tywyll (1990). Her introduction to Welsh literature for English-speaking readers, A Private Language, appeared in 1997.
