= Holtwood Arboretum =

Recreation area and preserve in Pennsylvania

Coordinates: 39.837°N 76.330°W

Holtwood Nature Preserve
- Interactive map of Holtwood Nature Preserve
- Open: Open daily.
- Website: Official website

The Holtwood Arboretum over 5,000 acres (20 km^{2}), also known as Holtwood Nature Preserve, is a recreation area, arboretum, and wildflower preserve located on New Village Road off Pennsylvania Route 372 in Lancaster County, Holtwood, Pennsylvania. The preserve is open to the public daily without charge.

The site is owned by PPL Corporation and provides public recreation, camping, hiking, picnicking, sightseeing, fishing, and hunting. The lower Susquehanna River runs through the preserve, which also contains substantial fish ladders (said to be the largest in the United States) and a museum of Native American artifacts.

== See also ==
- List of botanical gardens in the United States
