= Arboretum Villanova =

Former arboretum in Villanova, Pennsylvania

Coordinates: 40.037029°N 75.343316°W

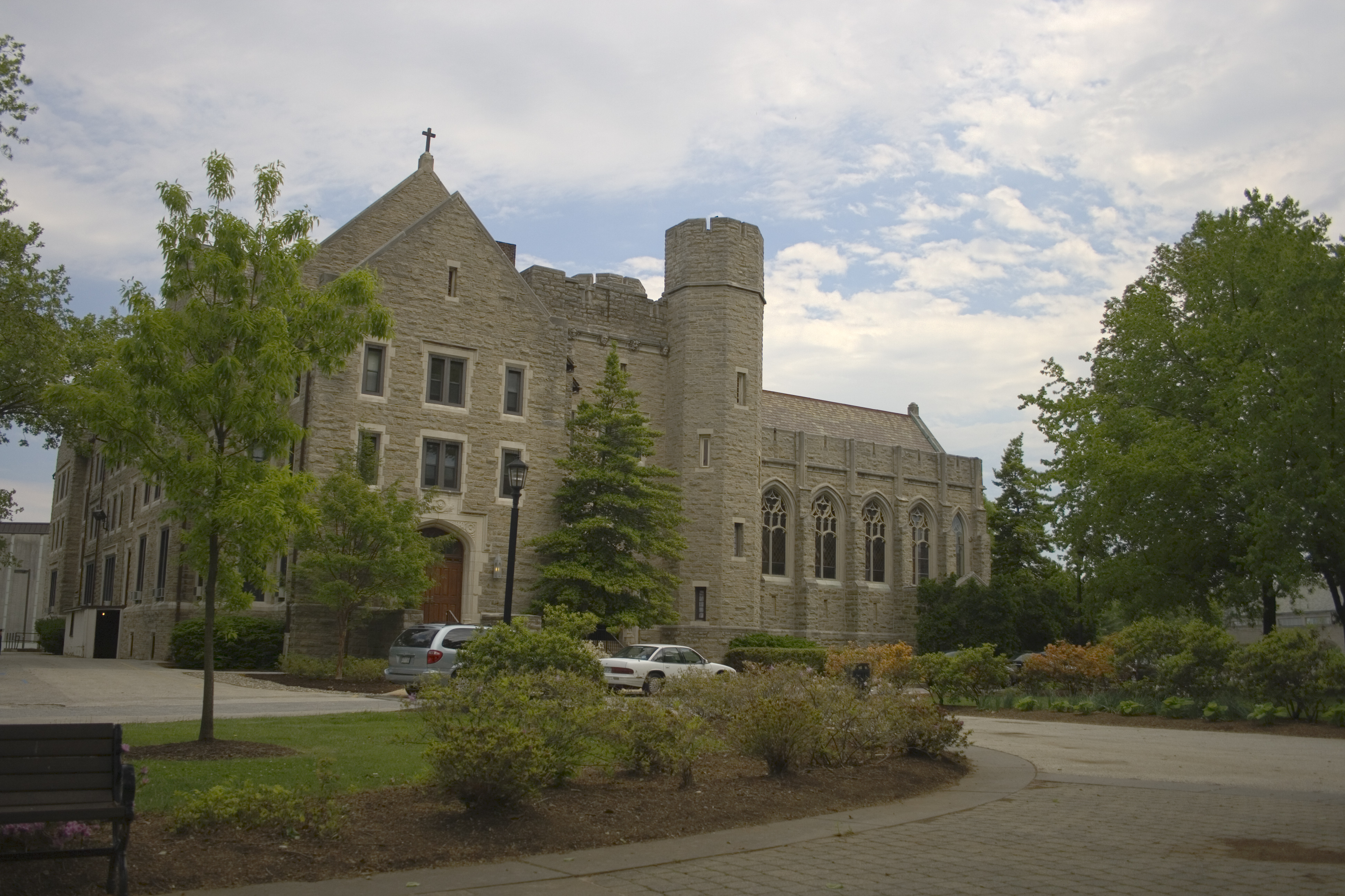
- Corr Hall at the campus of Villanova University
- Interactive map of Arboretum Villanova

Arboretum Villanova is the name of a former 222 acres (90 ha) arboretum located throughout the campus of Villanova University in Villanova, Pennsylvania. It is open to the public daily without charge.

Designated an arboretum in 1993, the site has since lost this designation. It contains roughly 1,500 trees of 254 different species. Its collection includes sequoia, sycamore, pine, flowering pear, crabapple, cherry, and horse chestnut trees, along with many other varieties. Many are labeled.

The trees are maintained by the campus Grounds Division, which is also responsible for strategic planning for the trees.

== See also ==
- List of botanical gardens in the United States
