= Bryn Mawr Campus Arboretum =

Arboretum in Bryn Mawr, Pennsylvania

Coordinates: 40.02630°N 75.312867°W

Bryn Mawr Campus Arboretum (135 acres) is an arboretum located across the campus of Bryn Mawr College, 101 North Merion Avenue, Bryn Mawr, Pennsylvania. It is open daily without charge.

The campus was first designed by Calvert Vaux (1824-1895), with a final design drawn up in 1884. Very little of this design was ever implemented, however. Noted landscape architect Frederick Law Olmsted visited the college in 1895, and in 1897 drew up a general plan incorporating Vaux's earlier work in collaboration with his nephew and partner, John C. Olmsted (1852-1920). This plan was generally followed over the next few decades, though it then gave way to newer plans.

== See also ==
- List of botanical gardens in the United States
