= Swiss Pines =

Arboretum and Japanese garden in Malvern, Pennsylvania

Coordinates: 40.09046°N 75.55235°W

Swiss Pines is a 19-acre (7.7 ha) arboretum and Japanese garden that is located on Charlestown Road in Malvern, Pennsylvania.

== History and notable features ==
Swiss Pines was established by Arnold Bartschi (1903-1996), who was a native of Switzerland who was, by the mid-1930s, owner of the J. Edwards Shoe Company. In 1957, he purchased the 200 acres (81 ha) of the former Llewellyn estate; during the next thirty years, he developed the Swiss Pines site. It became a nonprofit foundation in 1960.

At present, Swiss Pines displays a Japanese tea house and garden, a stone garden, statuary, streams, lake, stone lanterns, and bridges set among naturalistic plantings. Plant collections include the Glendale Azalea Garden (150 varieties); the herb garden (100 species), the groundcover garden (28 varieties), and the pinetum (over 200 types of conifers).

Per the Charlestown Township website, Swiss Pines was closed for the foreseeable future as of 2013. In 2023 Charlestown Township assumed ownership of the property and has begun planning to make the property available for public use. Swiss Pines continues to be closed to the public during the restoration period.

== See also ==
- List of botanical gardens in the United States
