= American College Arboretum =

Arboretum in Bryn Mawr, Pennsylvania

Coordinates: 40.016667°N 75.328235°W

- Interactive map of American College Arboretum
- Type: Arboretum
- Area: 35 acres (14 ha)

The American College Arboretum 35 acres (14 ha) is an arboretum located on the campus of The American College in Bryn Mawr, Pennsylvania, at 270 South Bryn Mawr Avenue. It is open daily without charge.

The arboretum began in 1959 when the college started preserving trees, and was formally established as an arboretum in 1994. Today the arboretum contains about 600 labeled trees of many species, as well as a small valley with a pond. It also features the Samuel Weese Conifer Collection and the Margaret Bradshaw Sundial Garden.

== See also ==
- List of botanical gardens in the United States
