= University of Pittsburgh =

State-related university in Pittsburgh, Pennsylvania, US

- Former names: Pittsburgh Academy (1787–1819); Western University of Pennsylvania (1819–1908)
- Motto: Veritas et Virtus (Latin)
- Motto in English: "Truth and Virtue"
- Type: State-related research university
- Established: February 28, 1787; 239 years ago
- Accreditation: MSCHE
- Academic affiliations: AAU; ORAU; URA; Space-grant
- Endowment: $6.15 billion (2025)
- Chancellor: Joan Gabel
- Provost: Joseph J. McCarthy
- Faculty: 6,074 • 5,702 (Pittsburgh Campus)
- Students: 35,528 (fall 2025) • 31,237 (Pittsburgh Campus)
- Undergraduates: 25,679 (fall 2025) • 21,388 (Pittsburgh Campus)
- Postgraduates: 9,849 (fall 2025) (Note: All graduate students are at the Pittsburgh Campus)
- Location: Pittsburgh, Pennsylvania, U.S. 40°26′41″N 79°57′12″W
- Campus: 132 acres (53 ha); Large city
- Other campuses: Bradford; Greensburg; Johnstown; Titusville
- Newspaper: The Pitt News
- Colors: Blue and gold
- Nickname: Panthers
- Sporting affiliations: NCAA Division I FBS – ACC
- Mascot: Roc the Panther
- Website: pitt.edu

Pennsylvania Historical Marker
- Designated: November 2, 1979

The University of Pittsburgh (Pitt) is a state-related research university in Pittsburgh, Pennsylvania, United States. The university is composed of seventeen undergraduate and graduate schools and colleges at its urban Pittsburgh campus, home to the university's central administration and over 31,000 undergraduate and graduate students. The 132-acre Pittsburgh campus includes various historic buildings that are part of the Schenley Farms Historic District, most notably its 42-story Gothic revival centerpiece, the Cathedral of Learning. Pitt is a member of the Association of American Universities and is classified among "R1: Doctoral Universities – Very high research activity".

Pitt traces its roots to the Pittsburgh Academy founded by Hugh Henry Brackenridge in 1787. While the city was still on the edge of the American frontier at the time, Pittsburgh's rapid growth meant that a proper university was soon needed, and Pitt's charter was altered in 1819 to confer university status on it as the Western University of Pennsylvania. After surviving two fires and several relocations, the university moved to its current location in Pittsburgh's Oakland neighborhood, and by act of the state legislature was renamed the University of Pittsburgh in 1908. Pitt was a private institution until 1966, when it became part of the Commonwealth System of Higher Education.

The campus is situated adjacent to the flagship medical facilities of its closely affiliated University of Pittsburgh Medical Center (UPMC) and its flagship hospital, UPMC Presbyterian, as well as the Carnegie Museums of Pittsburgh, Schenley Park, and Carnegie Mellon University. The university also operates four undergraduate branch campuses in Western Pennsylvania, located in Bradford, Greensburg, Johnstown, and Titusville. In athletics, Pitt competes in Division I of the NCAA as the Pittsburgh Panthers, primarily as members of the Atlantic Coast Conference.

== History ==
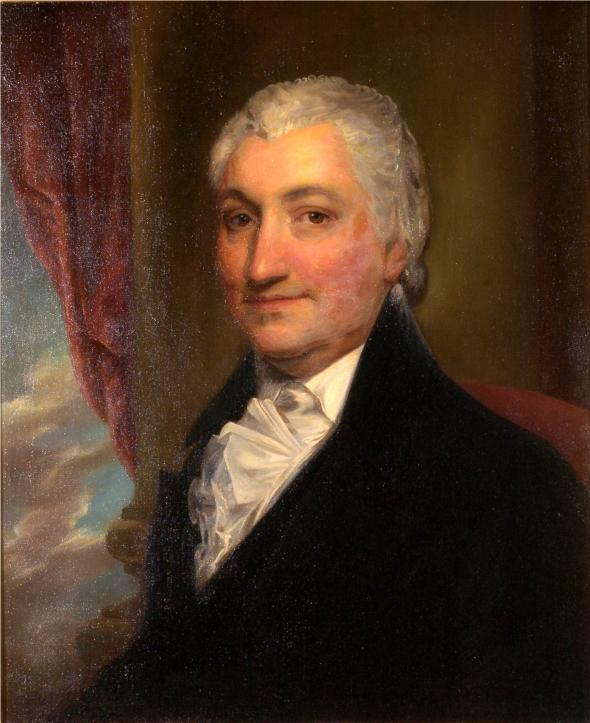
Hugh Henry Brackenridge, founder of Pittsburgh Academy, the precursor to the University of Pittsburgh

=== Founding ===
Founded by Hugh Henry Brackenridge as Pittsburgh Academy in 1787, the University of Pittsburgh is one of the few universities and colleges established in the 18th century in the United States. It is the oldest continuously chartered institution of learning in the U.S. west of the Allegheny Mountains. The school began as a preparatory school, presumably in a log cabin, possibly as early as 1770 in Western Pennsylvania, then a frontier. Brackenridge obtained a charter for the school from the state legislature of the Commonwealth of Pennsylvania on February 28, 1787, just ten weeks before the opening of the Constitutional Convention in Philadelphia. A brick building was erected in 1790 on the south side of Third Street and Cherry Alley for the Pittsburgh Academy. The small two-story brick building, with a gable facing the alley, contained three rooms: one below and two above.

=== Western University of Pennsylvania ===
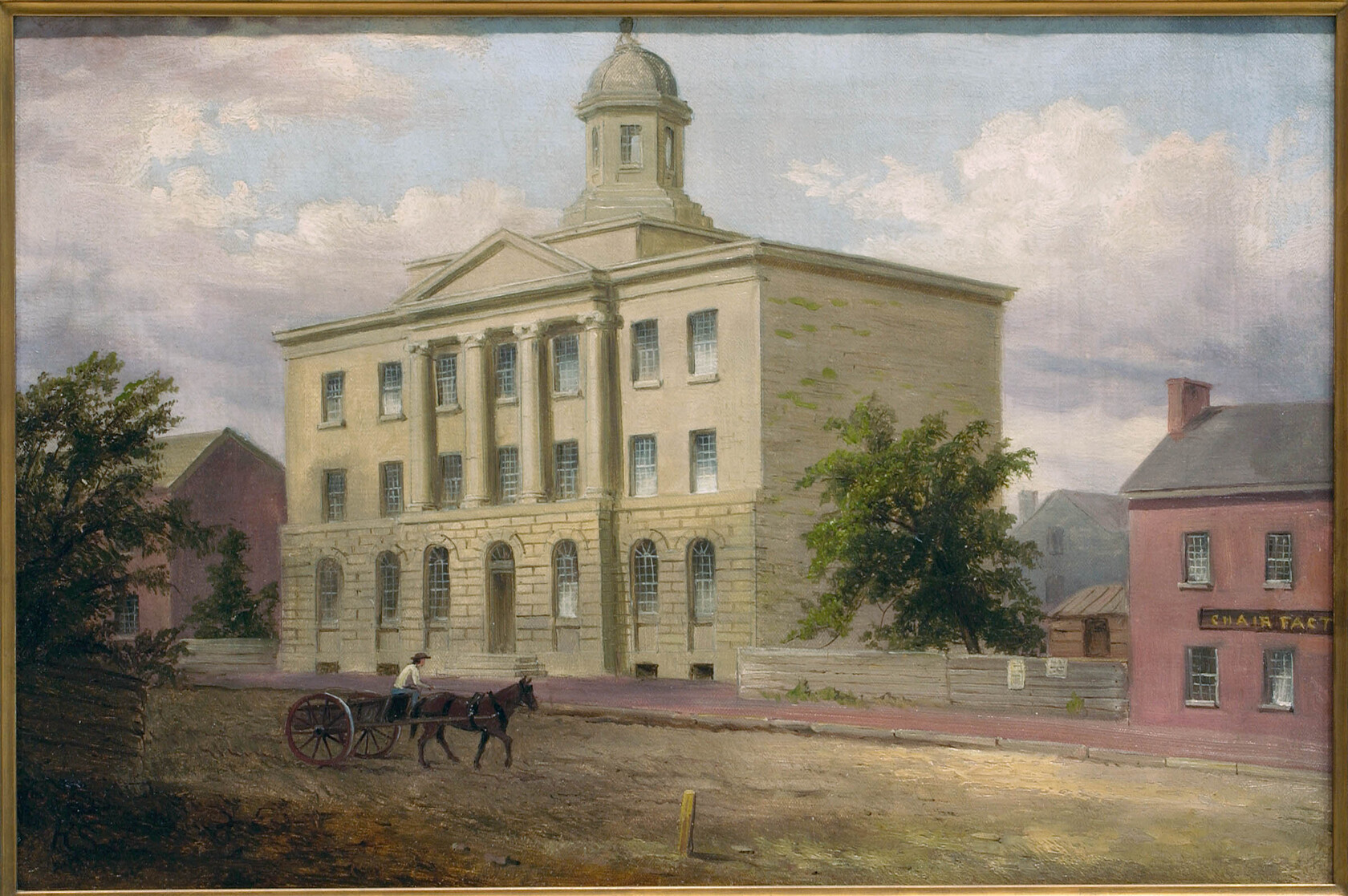
The university in 1833 at its location on 3rd Avenue in downtown Pittsburgh

Within a short period, more advanced education in the area was needed, so in 1819 the Commonwealth of Pennsylvania amended the school's 1787 charter to confer university status. The school was named the Western University of Pennsylvania, or WUP, and was intended to be the western sister institution to the University of Pennsylvania in Philadelphia. By 1830, WUP had moved into a new three-story, freestone-fronted building, with Ionic columns and a cupola, near its original buildings fronting the south side of Third Street, between Smithfield Street and Cherry Alley in downtown Pittsburgh. By the 1830s, the university faced severe financial pressure to abandon its traditional liberal education in favor of the state legislature's desire for it to provide more vocational training. The decision to remain committed to liberal education nearly killed the university, but it persevered despite its abandonment by the city and state.

The university's buildings, along with most of its records and files, were destroyed in the Great Fire of 1845 that wiped out 20 square blocks of Pittsburgh. Classes were temporarily held in Trinity Church until a new building was constructed on Duquesne Way (on what was the site of the former Horne's department store). Four years later, in 1849, this building also was destroyed by fire. Due to the catastrophic nature of these fires, operations were suspended for a few years to allow the university time to regroup and rebuild. By 1854, WUP had erected a new building on the corner of Ross and Diamond (now Forbes Avenue) streets (site of the present day City-County building) and classes resumed in 1855. It is during this era, in 1867, that Samuel Pierpont Langley, astronomer, inventor, aviation pioneer and future Secretary of the Smithsonian Institution, was chosen as director of the Allegheny Observatory that was donated to WUP in 1865. Langley was professor of astronomy and physics and remained at WUP until 1891, when he was succeeded by another prominent astronomer, James Keeler. Growing quickly during this period, WUP outgrew its downtown facilities and the university moved its campus to Allegheny City (present-day North Side).

The university eventually found itself on a 10-acre (4.0 ha) site on the North Side's Observatory Hill at the location of its Allegheny Observatory. There, it constructed two new buildings, Science Hall and Main Hall, that were occupied by 1889 and 1890 respectively. During this era, the first collegiate football team was formed at Pitt in 1889. In 1892, the Western Pennsylvania Medical College was amalgamated into the university (now the University of Pittsburgh School of Medicine). By 1893, the university had graduated its first African-American, William Hunter Dammond. In 1895 WUP established its School of Law, and Andrew Carnegie and George Westinghouse were elected to the board of trustees, where they joined Andrew Mellon, who had been elected in 1894. The Pittsburgh College of Pharmacy and Pittsburgh Dental School also joined the university in 1896. In 1898, the first women, sisters Margaret and Stella Stein, graduated from the university. During this period, university engineering professor Reginald Fessenden was conducting pioneering work in radio broadcasting. By 1904, playing at Exposition Park, the university had its first undefeated football team.

=== A new name and home ===
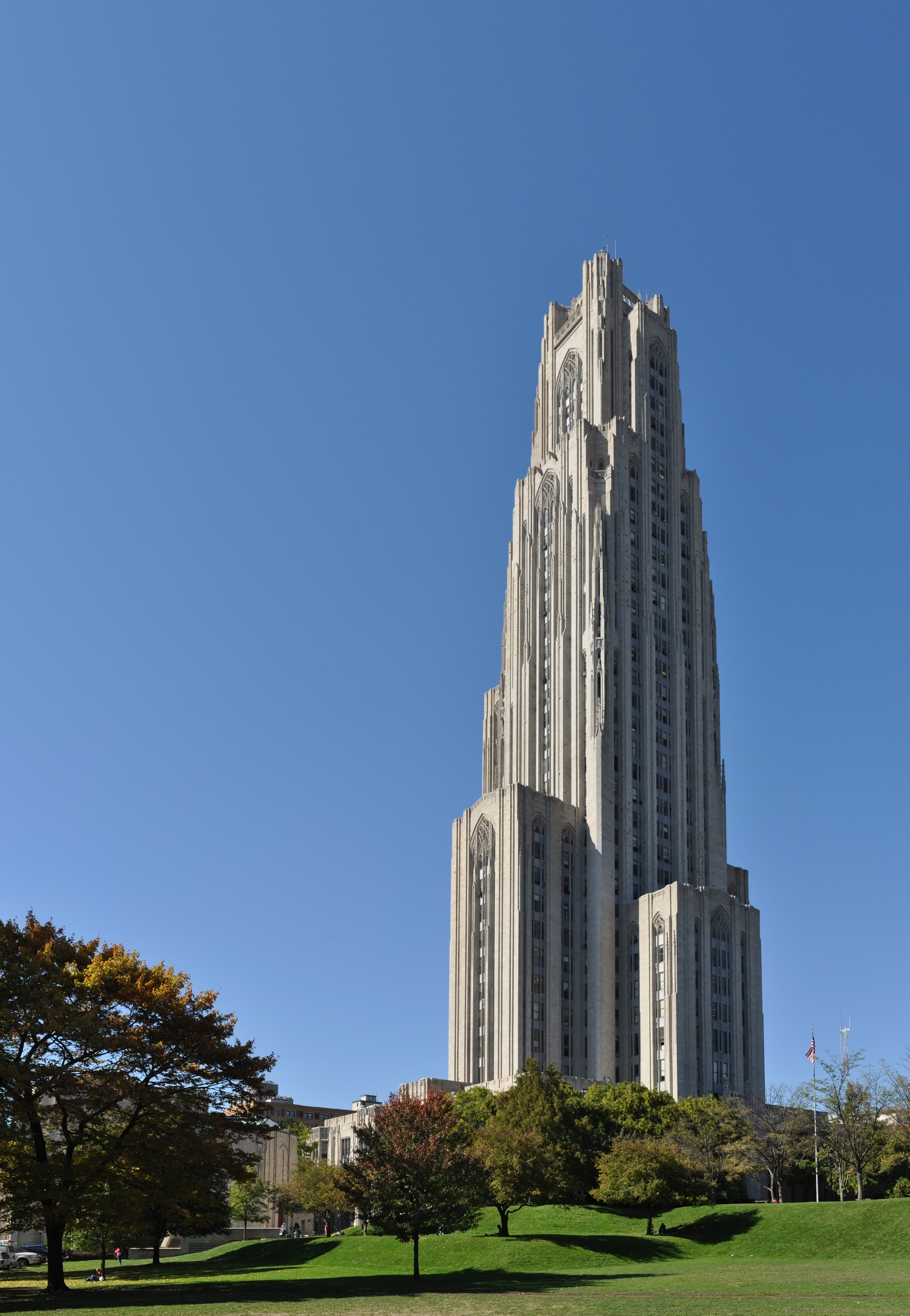
The Cathedral of Learning, the centerpiece of Pitt's campus and the tallest educational building in the Western Hemisphere

Citing a need to avoid confusion, distinguish itself from the University of Pennsylvania, and return to its roots by identifying itself with the city, the Western University of Pennsylvania, by act of the state legislature, was renamed the University of Pittsburgh in the summer of 1908. During this time, the university had also outgrown its accommodations on what is now the North Side and its departments had been scattered throughout the city for years. To consolidate all of its components on one campus, WUP bought 43 acres (17 ha) of land in December 1907 in what is now the Oakland neighborhood of Pittsburgh and began relocating departments there by 1909. The initial campus plan for the new location centered on the winning submission from a national architectural contest that incorporated a Greek Acropolis design by Henry Hornbostel for 30 buildings. However, due to financial and other constraints, only four of the buildings were constructed in this style, of which only Thaw Hall remains today. In the fall of 1909, the university became the first college to adopt the panther as its mascot. In 1910, Jean Hamilton Walls became the first African-American woman to graduate from the university. It was also during this period that the university, led by Chancellor Samuel McCormick, again held off pressures to abandon the school's commitment to liberal education in favor of more technical-based training. During his administration, McCormick also led the university into a new level of national recognition, expansion, and growth, as well as beginning institutional support of athletics.

In the 1920s, new university chancellor John Gabbert Bowman declared that he had a vision for a centerpiece "tall building" for the university. The 14-acre (5.7 ha) Frick Acres property in Oakland was soon purchased and plans for the campus shifted focus from the hillside to a neo-Gothic Revival plan that today comprises the Cathedral of Learning, Heinz Memorial Chapel, Stephen Foster Memorial, and Clapp Hall buildings. By 1925, Bowman had settled on a design by Charles Klauder for the "tall building": an attention-getting 535-foot (163 m) tower whose great height, with open spaces all around, would suggest the "character that ought to be in an educated man." The building's "parallel lines going up and up...would express courage [and] fearlessness" and it would "unify Pittsburgh into a community conscious of its character." The cathedral is "cut off" flat at the top to suggest that its lines, like education, have no ending. The building was financed by donors and by a campaign to collect dimes from local school children. Bowman was a persuasive leader and although the Great Depression intervened, the Cathedral of Learning, on which construction was begun in 1926, began hosting classes in 1931 and was formally dedicated in 1937. Today, it remains the second tallest university building in the world and contains an equally impressive interior highlighted by a 22,000-square-foot (2,000 m^{2}) Gothic hall Commons Room with 52-foot-tall (16 m) arches currently surrounded by 31 Nationality Rooms.

=== Development of the polio vaccine ===
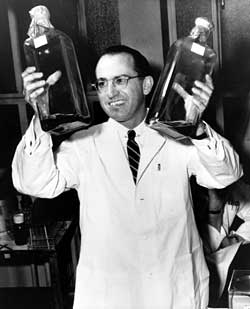
Jonas Salk developed the first polio vaccine at the University of Pittsburgh.

In the early 20th century, epidemics of polio began to hit the United States and other industrialized countries. As hospitals filled with patients in iron lungs, and tens of thousands were left disabled, the fear of polio grew, leading to the closing of many public facilities. Meanwhile, Jonas Salk had set up the University of Pittsburgh's Virus Research Lab in the basement of what is now Salk Hall. By 1951, Salk and his team had begun immunization experiments in monkeys using dead polio virus. Soon, however, Salk began to test inoculations in paralyzed polio patients and by 1953 human trials among the general population were initiated. By the spring of the following year, the largest controlled field trials in medical history were underway, and by 1955 the vaccine developed by Salk and his researchers was declared effective. By 1962, Salk's vaccine had reduced the incidence of polio in the United States by 95 percent. The breakthroughs in immunology and vaccine development at Pitt by Salk and his team are considered one of the most significant scientific and medical achievements in history.

=== State relations to present day ===
In 1966, Pitt was designated by Pennsylvania as a state-related university. As such, Pitt receives public funds ($154.3 million in fiscal year 2016) covering about 7% of its operating budget, and offers reduced tuition to Pennsylvania residents. Pitt retains independent control. Upon affiliation with the state, subsidized tuition led to a massive influx of new students and rapid expansion of Pitt's size and scope. In the 1970s, Pitt's football team returned to greatness with a national championship season in 1976 led by Hall of Fame running back Tony Dorsett and continued success in the 1980s with players such as Hall of Fame quarterback Dan Marino. In the 1980s, significant medical research in the field of organ transplantation was conducted by Thomas Starzl, establishing Pitt as the world leader in the field of organ transplantation. In 1991, chancellor Wesley Posvar retired after 24 years in office. His administration is best known for elimination of the university's debt from its 1960s financial crisis and for increasing the school's prestige and endowment. Under Posvar, Pitt's operating budget grew sevenfold to $630 million and its endowment tripled to $257 million.

Mark Nordenberg was chancellor of the university from 1995 to 2014 and led Pitt through a period of substantial progress, including a $2-billion capital-raising campaign that is over three quarters of the way toward achieving its goal and a $1-billion 12-year facilities plan. Major initiatives and events that have occurred during his tenure include the construction of the Petersen Events Center, a major expansion of on-campus housing, the growth of the University of Pittsburgh Medical Center and the restructuring of its relationship with the university, and a series of disruptive bomb threats that occurred in 2012.

Patrick D. Gallagher was named the 18th chancellor of the university and assumed the office on August 1, 2014.

== Campus ==
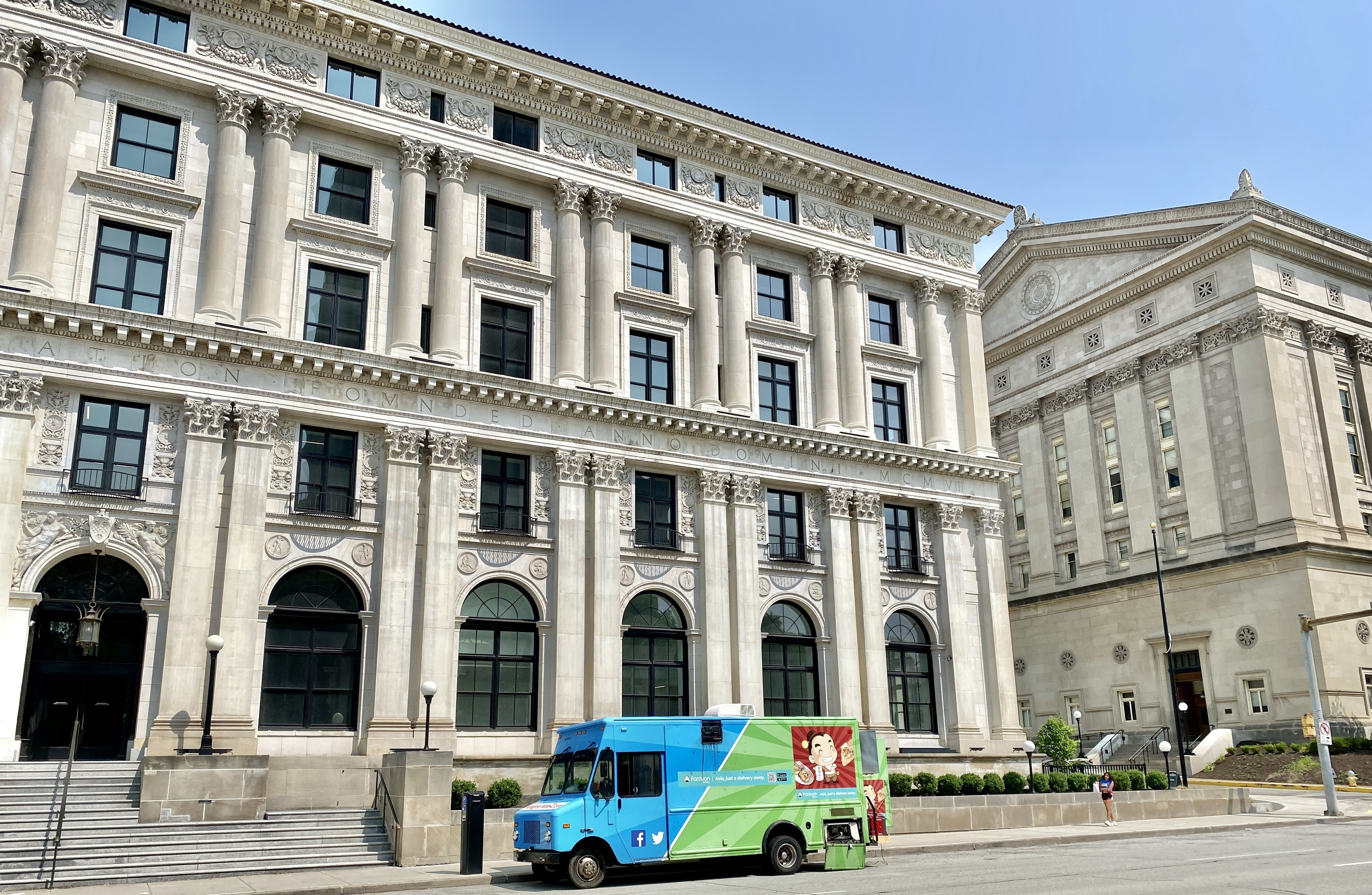
The Pittsburgh Athletic Association building, one of several Pitt buildings listed on the National Register of Historic Places, is pictured to the left of Alumni Hall, both Benno Janssen designed buildings that are examples of Renaissance Revival and Greek Revial architecture, respectively.

The University of Pittsburgh's main campus comprises approximately 132 urban acres (0.53 km^{2}) located in Pittsburgh's historic Oakland neighborhood. Much of the campus, including its centerpiece 42-story Cathedral of Learning, falls within the Oakland Civic Center/Schenley Farms National Historic District. The campus has been noted for its architecture, which includes an eclectic mix of styles including Greek Revival, Neogothic, Italian Renaissance, and modern, for which it has been termed "a theme park of replica buildings, representing the architecture of the past speaking to the present." The university has won multiple national awards for its campus groundskeeping.

The University of Pittsburgh's main campus contains four contiguous sections: upper (sports complexes, residence halls); mid (Benedum, Chevron, Allen and Thaw Halls); lower (Cathedral of Learning, Union, Posvar Hall); and on the west end of campus, the medical center complex. The campus is bordered by Darragh Street/McKee Place to the west and Bellefield Avenue/Dithridge Street to the east; Forbes and Fifth avenues traverse the campus from west to east. Although generally within walking distance, the university also runs a bus and shuttle service between various campus locations and bordering neighborhoods.

The main campus is within walking distance of many recreational, cultural, and educational institutions in the Oakland neighborhood. The campus is adjacent to Schenley Plaza, the main branch of the Carnegie Public Library, the Carnegie Museums of Natural History and Art and the Carnegie Music Hall, as well as portions of Carnegie Mellon University. Carlow University is just west of campus, adjacent to the university's medical center complexes. The main quad of Carnegie Mellon University, Central Catholic High School, and historic Schenley Park, site of the Phipps Conservatory & Botanical Gardens, lie across Junction Hollow on the east end.

=== Historic buildings ===
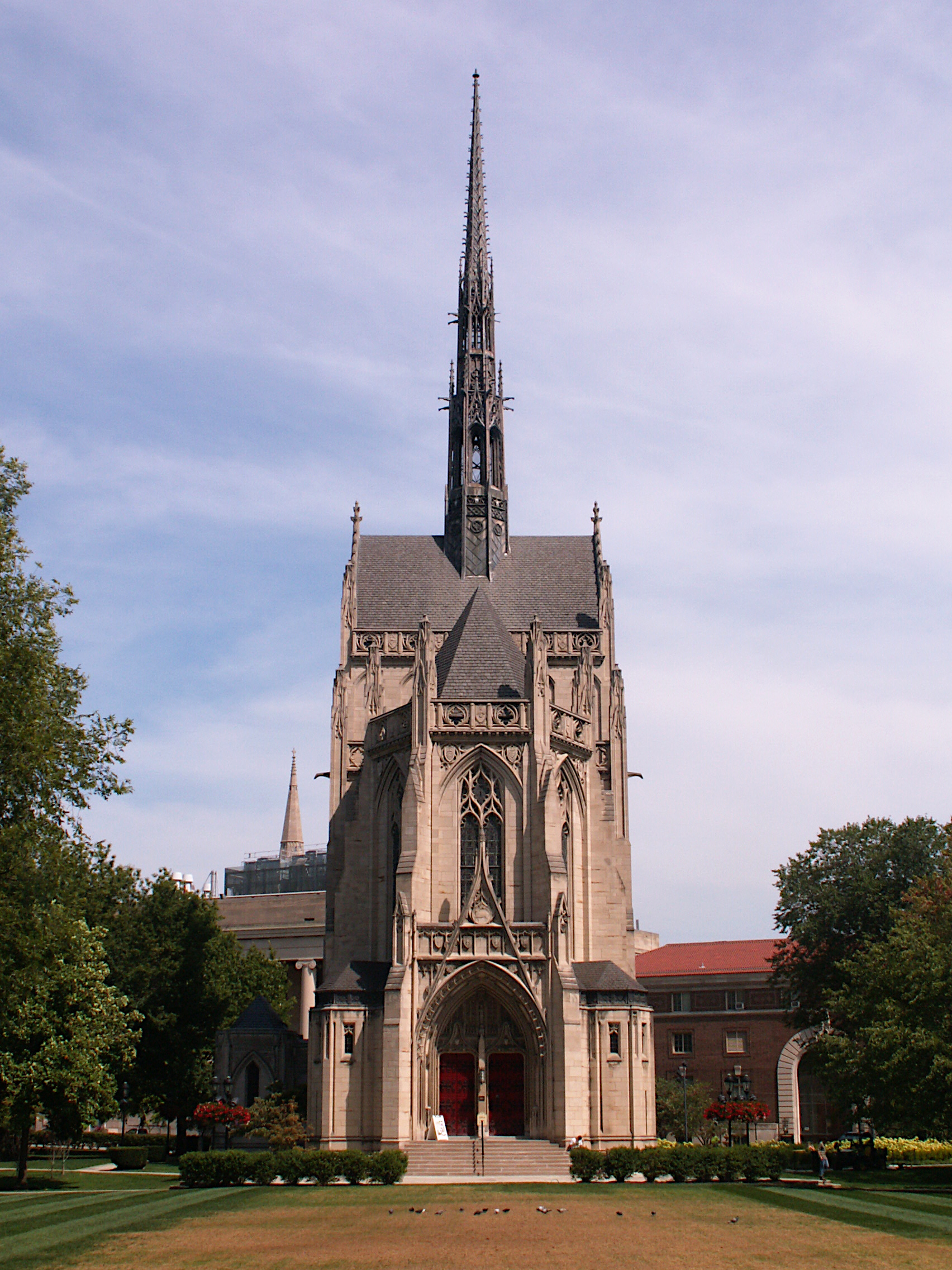
Heinz Memorial Chapel

Four Pitt buildings are individually listed on the National Register of Historic Places: Allegheny Observatory (in Pittsburgh's Riverview Park on the Northside), the Cathedral of Learning, the Pittsburgh Athletic Association building, and the Ford Motor building. Twenty-one of Pitt's buildings (including the 5 residence halls that make up Schenley Quadrangle, see below) are contributing properties to the Schenley Farms-Oakland Civic Center Historic District that has been listed on the National Register of Historic Places as a historic district.

Due to the historical nature of various sites around Pitt's buildings, the Commonwealth of Pennsylvania has placed historical markers outside the Allegheny Observatory, Posvar Hall, Salk Hall, Stephen Foster Memorial, and the William Pitt Union. In addition, a Pennsylvania Historical Marker has been placed on campus near the Cathedral of Learning to mark the significance of the University of Pittsburgh itself.

In addition, the Pittsburgh History and Landmarks Foundation has designated the following Pitt buildings as Pittsburgh Historic Landmarks: Allegheny Observatory, Allen Hall, Alumni Hall, Bellefield Hall, Chancellor's Residence, Cathedral of Learning, the Cathedral of Learning interior rooms, Gardner Steel Conference Center, Heinz Memorial Chapel, Thaw Hall, Salk Hall, Schenley Quadrangle residence halls, Stephen Foster Memorial, the University Child Development Center, and the William Pitt Union.

Other Pitt buildings not designated individually as landmarks, but listed among the 16 Pitt-owned contributing properties to the Schenley Farms Historic District, include Clapp Hall, O'Hara Student Center, Ruskin Hall, Thackeray Hall, Frick Fine Arts Building, Music Building, and the University Club.

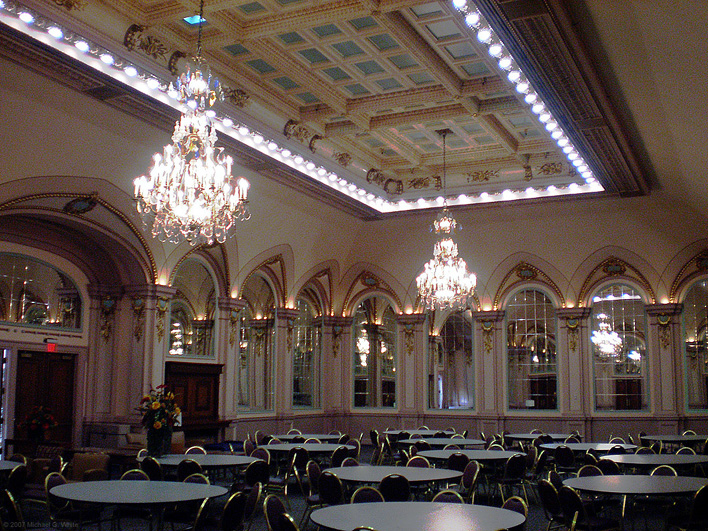
The restored Louis XV mirrored ballroom of the Beaux-Arts styled William Pitt Union

Historic structures within, adjacent to, or near Pitt's campus, but not belonging to the university, include the Carnegie Museum buildings, Frick School, Forbes Field wall remnant, Magee Estate iron fence, the Schenley Fountain, Mellon Institute, Phipps Conservatory & Botanical Gardens, the Pittsburgh Athletic Association, St. Paul's Cathedral, St. Nicholas Greek Orthodox Church, Schenley High School, Soldiers and Sailors Memorial Hall – where scenes of The Silence of the Lambs were filmed in 1990, and the Stephen Foster sculpture. Many of these buildings and their facilities are integrated into the events and activities of the university.

=== Other buildings ===
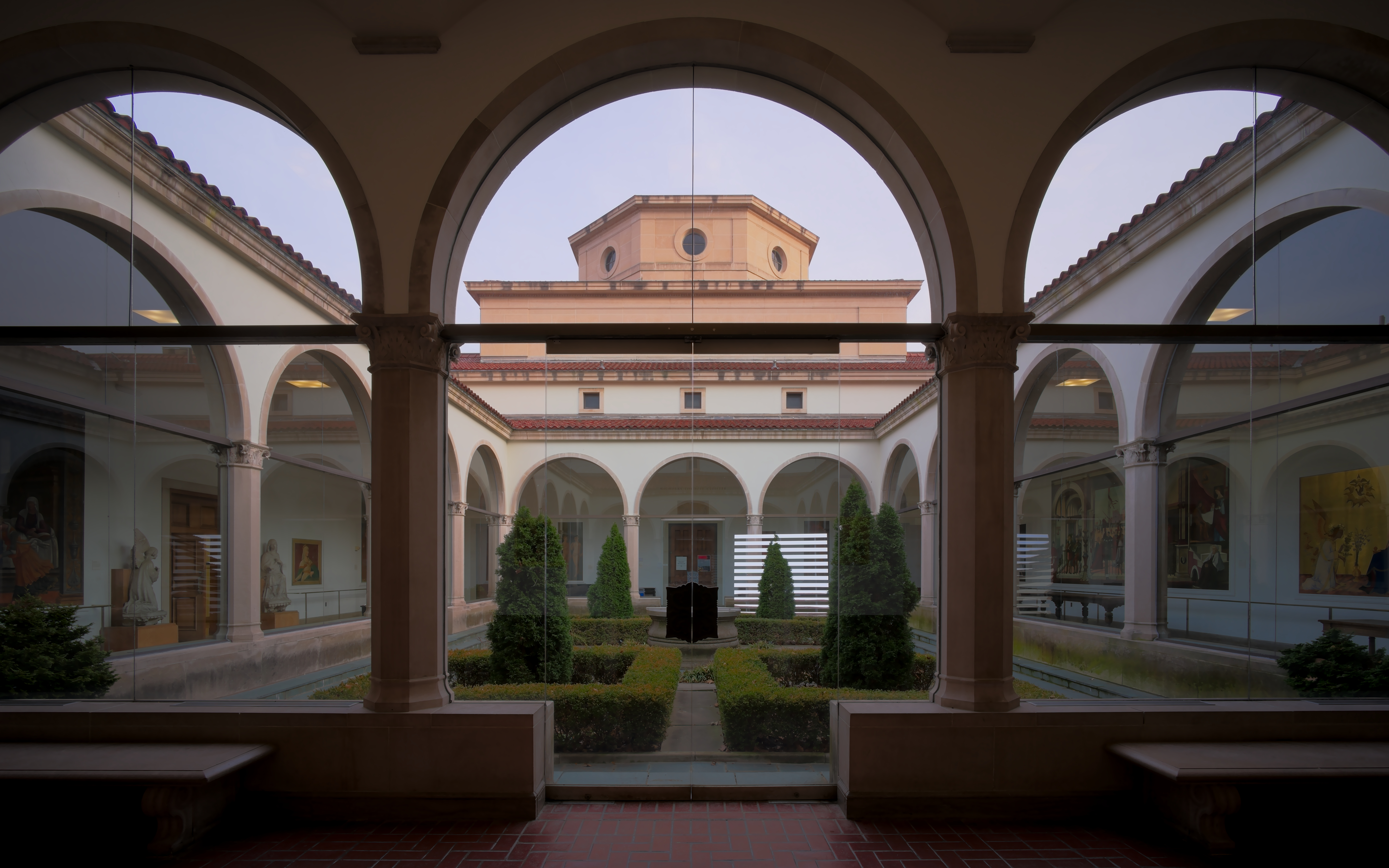
The art gallery at the Frick Fine Arts Building

The majority of Pitt-owned facilities are clustered in the Oakland neighborhood of Pittsburgh which includes the Schenley Farms Historic District, however a few prominent facilities are scattered elsewhere throughout the city, including the adjacent Shadyside neighborhood. Pitt also maintains regional Pennsylvania campuses in Bradford, Greensburg, Johnstown, and Titusville, as well as a Computer Center in RIDC Park in Blawnox, the Plum Boro Science Center in Plum, the University of Pittsburgh Applied Research Center (U-PARC) in Harmarville, and the Pymatuning Laboratory of Ecology in Linesville. The university also has a major archeological research site, the Allen L. Cook Spring Creek Preserve, near Rock River, Wyoming.

Athletic facilities of the University of Pittsburgh Panthers that are located in Oakland in the upper campus and include the Charles L Cost Sports Center, Fitzgerald Field House, the Petersen Events Center, Trees Hall and Trees Field. An approximately $30 million upgrade of on-campus sports facilities, starting with the Petersen Sports Complex, includes new soccer, baseball, softball facilities, and helps clear a space for the future construction of a new track and field and band complex. Athletic facilities in Pittsburgh that are located outside of the Oakland neighborhood include Acrisure Stadium and the UPMC Sports Performance Complex. In September 2025, the university opened a $240 million, nine-story Recreation and Wellness Center on O'Hara Street, featuring an aquatics center, climbing wall, indoor running track, and wellness suites.

Major on-campus residence halls include the Litchfield Towers, Schenley Quadrangle, Forbes Hall, Bouquet Gardens and Ruskin Hall located on the lower campus, Lothrop Hall on the medical campus, and Panther, Nordenberg Hall, and Sutherland halls located on the upper campus.

=== University of Pittsburgh Medical Center ===
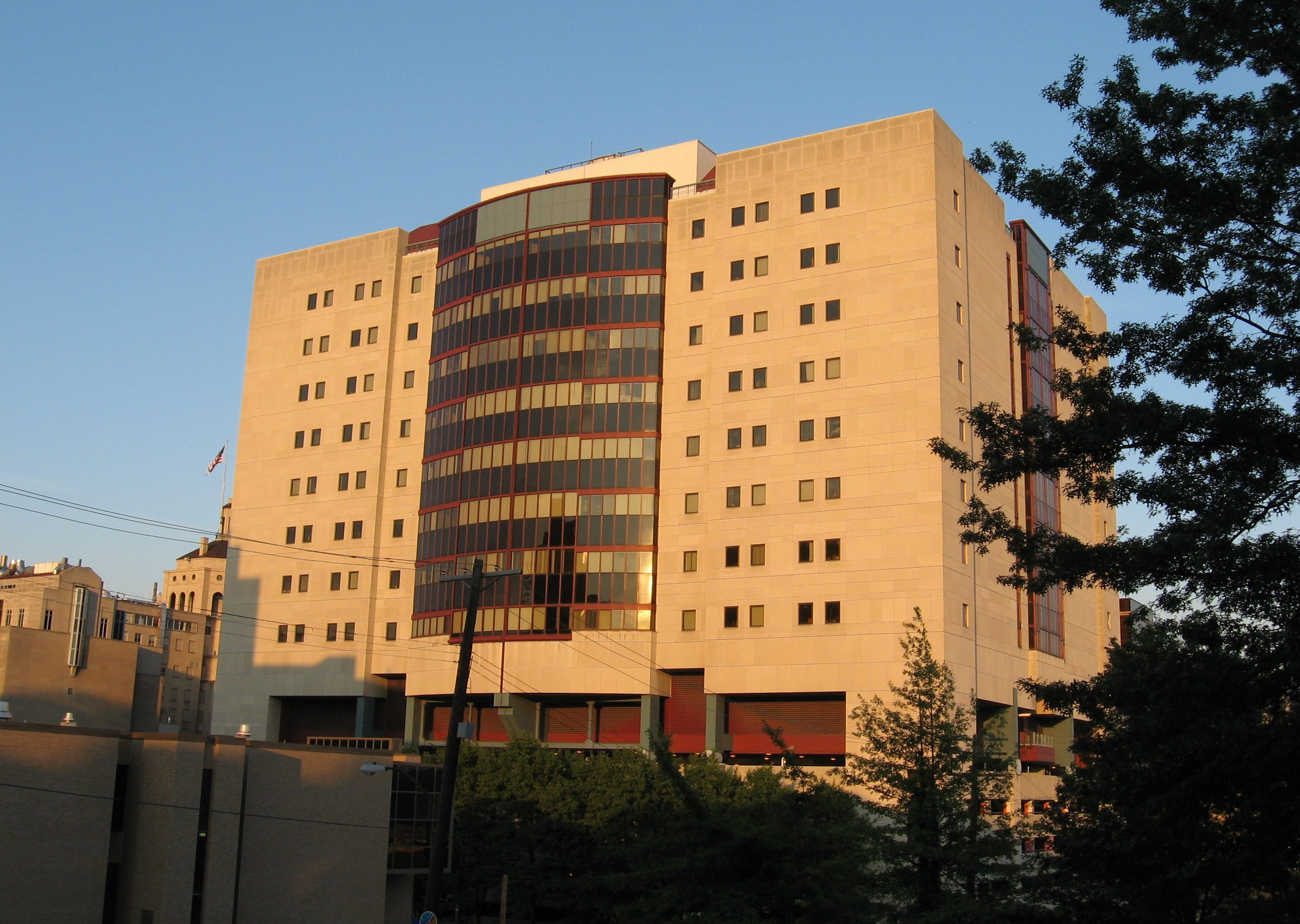
Thomas Starzl Biomedical Science Tower is connected to the med school and UPMC's flagship hospitals

The University of Pittsburgh Medical Center (UPMC) is consistently ranked in U.S. News & World Report's "Honor Roll" of America's top hospitals and consists of the following hospitals and facilities in the Pittsburgh neighborhood of Oakland, many of which have shared uses with various University departments: UPMC Presbyterian Hospital, UPMC Montefiore Hospital, Magee-Women's Hospital of UPMC, Western Psychiatric Institute and Clinic in Thomas Detre Hall, Eye and Ear Institute, Forbes Tower (home to the School of Health and Rehabilitation Sciences), Iroquois Building, Kaufman Medical Building, Medical Arts Building, 230 McKee Place, and UPMC University Center. UPMC academic hospitals and facilities elsewhere in Pittsburgh include the UPMC Children's Hospital of Pittsburgh campus in the Lawrenceville neighborhood, the UPMC Sports Performance Complex on the South Side, and the UPMC Shadyside and the University of Pittsburgh Cancer Institute in the Hillman Cancer Center (both located in the Shadyside neighborhood adjacent to Oakland).

=== Regional campuses ===
The university maintains four regional campuses, three of which are four year, residential colleges offering complete degree programs and varsity athletics, while the fourth campus serves as two-year education and training center. Some academic programs can started at the regional campuses and completed at the Pittsburgh campus. The regional campuses offer lower tuition rates including tuition-free education to eligible Pennsylvania residents with an annual household income at or below $75,000.

- University of Pittsburgh at Bradford – master's, bachelor's, associate's and certificates; NCAA Division III athletics
- University of Pittsburgh at Greensburg – bachelor's and certificates; NCAA Division III athletics
- University of Pittsburgh at Johnstown – master's, bachelor's, and certificates; NCAA Division II athletics
- University of Pittsburgh at Titusville – associate science in nursing and Manufacturing Assistance Center CNC training

== Community impact ==
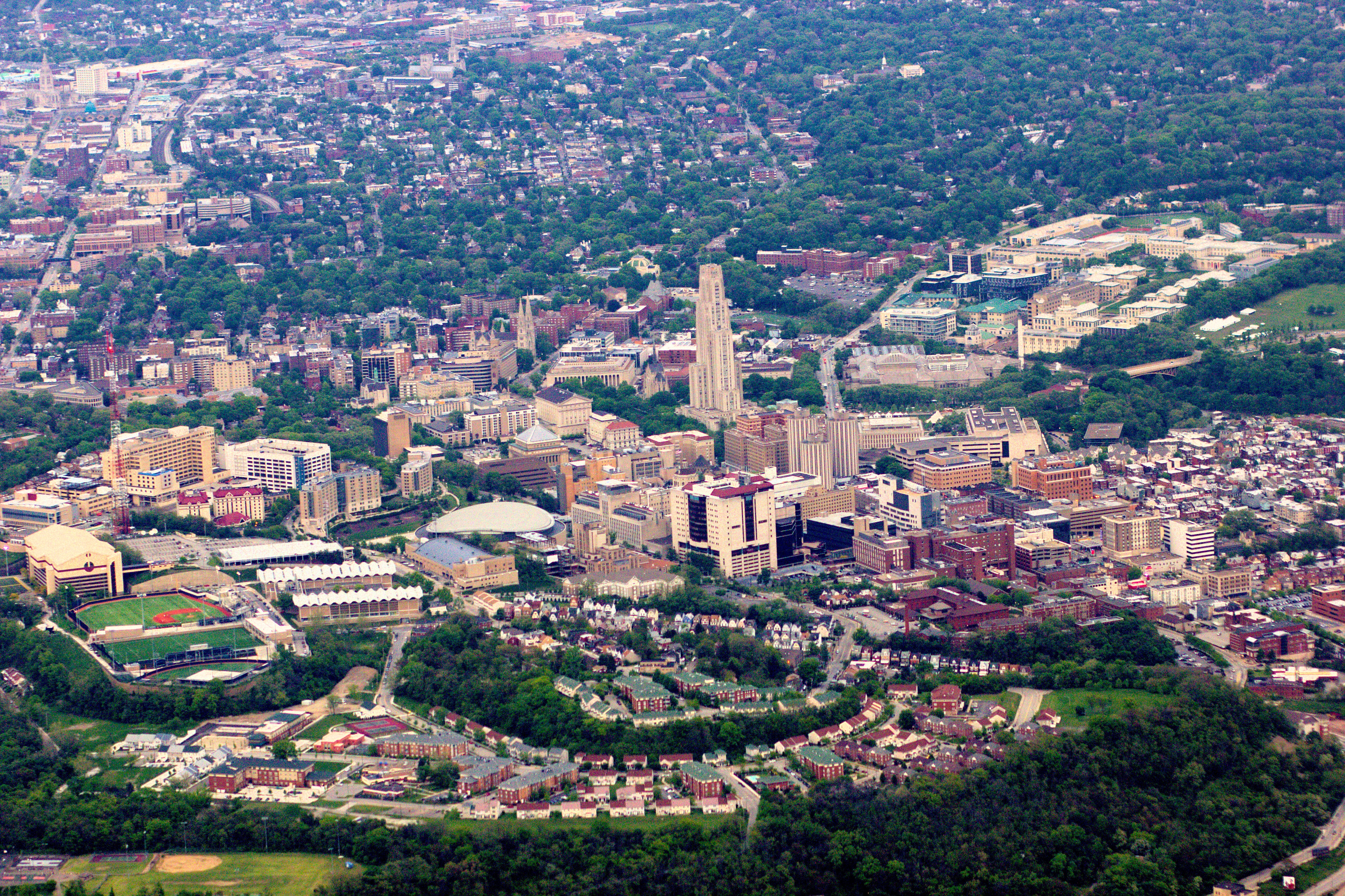
Aerial view of the university and Oakland neighborhood; Carnegie Mellon University is at top-right

The University of Pittsburgh has been noted for both its role in community outreach and its impact on the economy of the city and the Western Pennsylvania region. In 2009, Pitt was ranked second overall, and the top public university in the nation, as a "Best Neighbor" for positive impact on its urban community, including both commercial and residential activities such as revitalization, cultural renewal, economics, and community service and development according to the "Saviors of Our Cities" ranking. Pitt was also listed as a "best neighbor" in the previous ranking released in 2006. These rankings reflect the statistics that each year Pitt spends more than $1.7 billion in the community and supports nearly 33,800 jobs in Allegheny County. The university is the Pittsburgh region's second largest non-government employer behind its affiliated University of Pittsburgh Medical Center (UPMC). Pitt's research program alone imports more than $822 million into the region each year (more than $3.60 for each $1 of state appropriations), and supports some 23,100 local jobs. Pitt students also spend more than $213 million on goods, services, and rental payments within the local economy. Pitt ranked sixth in the number of startups spawned by technologies developed by its researchers according to Association of University Technology Managers.

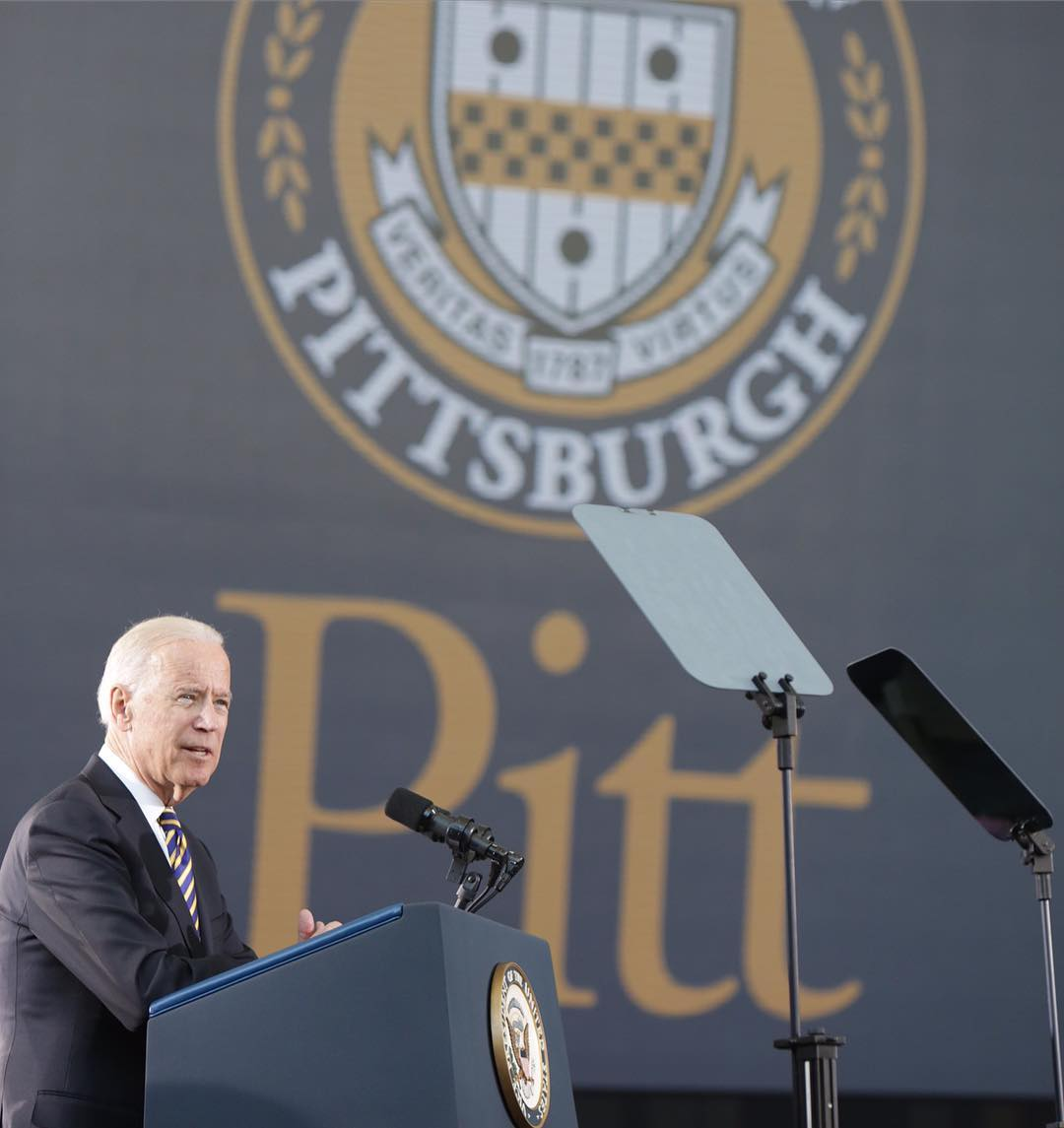
Then-Vice President of the United States Joe Biden speaks at the Petersen Events Center on April 5, 2016.

Pitt and its medical school are the academic partners of the closely affiliated the University of Pittsburgh Medical Center. With over 1450 employees and $1 billion annual revenue, UPMC is the largest non-government employer in Pennsylvania.

Through the Pitt Volunteer Pool, faculty and staff members donate more than 10,000 hours annually to community service projects for agencies such as the Salvation Army, Pittsburgh AIDS Task Force, and Greater Pittsburgh Community Food Bank.

Pitt is a leading producer of Peace Corps volunteers. According to the Peace Corps' 2008 ranking of colleges and universities, only 14 schools in the nation produced more Peace Corps volunteers. Pitt's graduate school also ranked tenth for most alumni Peace Corps volunteers.

=== Sustainability ===
The University of Pittsburgh has undertaken programs to improve sustainability initiatives and practices. Pitt started programs in ecology and established biological field stations in 1926. In 1990, Pitt was one of the first 22 signatories of the Talloires Declaration. In 2003, Pitt founded its Mascaro Center for Sustainable Innovation. In 2013, Pitt released its first sustainability report and in 2014 celebrated a "Year of Sustainability" by launching a Student Office of Sustainability that now has over 25 affiliated student organizations. In 2018, Pitt published its first comprehensive "Pitt Sustainability Plan", established the Office of Sustainability, and hired its first director of sustainability. In 2020, Pitt committed to achieving carbon neutrality by 2037 (its 250th anniversary) and its first climate action plan came out in 2022.

Pitt received a AASHE STARS Gold rating in 2021, building on its Silver rating from 2018, has long been on The Princeton Review's "Green Colleges" list, been included on the Environmental Protection Agency's Green Powered Universities list since 2018, won multiple Sustainable Pittsburgh Challenges, and has other third-party recognitions.

In 2018, the university announced its intention to buy all of the electricity from a run-of-the-river hydro power facility to be built by Rye Development at Allegheny Lock and Dam No. 2 on the Allegheny River in 2023. In 2020, the university announced a second local renewable power purchasing agreement, for solar power to be built on the border of Beaver and Allegheny counties near Pittsburgh International Airport.

The university has been criticized for some of its financial investments, namely those in the fossil fuel industry. In 2020, a Board report disclosed that endowment exposure to fossil fuels had decreased 42% between 2015 and 2020, with zero private investments in fossil fuels by the end of 2035.

== Organization and administration ==
College/school founding
| College/school | Year founded |
| Arts and Sciences | 1787 |
| Business (graduate) | 1960 |
| Business (undergraduate) | 1907 |
| Dental Medicine | 1896 |
| Education | 1910 |
| Engineering | 1846 |
| General Studies | 1932 |
| Health & Rehabilitation Sciences | 1969 |
| Honors | 1987 |
| Computing and Information | 2017 |
| Law | 1895 |
| Medicine | 1883 |
| Nursing | 1939 |
| Pharmacy | 1878 |
| Public & International Affairs | 1957 |
| Public Health | 1948 |
| Social Work | 1938 |

The university was chartered by the Commonwealth of Pennsylvania in 1787 and it operated as a fully private institution until an alteration to its charter in 1966 at which point it became part of the Commonwealth System of Higher Education. This conferred "state-related" status to the university making it a legal instrument of the Commonwealth which provides an annual financial appropriation, currently 7.7% of the university's total operating budget, in exchange for the university offering tuition discounts to students who are residents of Pennsylvania. Legally, however, the university remains a private entity, operating under its nonprofit corporate charter, governed by its independent Board of Trustees, and with its assets under its own ownership and control. Therefore, it retains the freedom and individuality of a private institution, both administratively and academically, setting its own standards for admissions, awarding of degrees, faculty qualifications, teaching, and staff hiring. (Note: Upon joining the Commonwealth System of Higher Education in 1966, the University of Pittsburgh legally remained a private entity and in practice, retained the administrative and academic freedom of a private institution. It sets its own standards for student admission and retention, faculty, and teaching. Its assets remain in the hands of the corporation, its employees are employed by the corporation, and its affairs are governed by an independent Board of Trustees. In-state tuition is subsidized by the Commonwealth of Pennsylvania and the state provides approximately 11% of its operating budget. The University of Pittsburgh is categorized as a public university in the Carnegie Foundation Classifications and is typically listed as a public university in third party publications. For simplicity, Pitt sometimes refers to itself a "public university".)

The university's board of trustees maintains ultimate legal authority, governance, and responsibility for the university but specifically reserves authority over selecting the university's chancellor; approval of major policies, particularly those related to the fiduciary responsibilities of the board; and the definition of the university's mission and goals. It is made up of 36 voting members: chancellor, 17 term trustees elected by the board, 6 alumni trustees elected by the board on nomination from the Alumni Association Board of directors, and 12 Commonwealth trustees. The governor of Pennsylvania, the president pro tempore of the Pennsylvania Senate, and the speaker of the Pennsylvania House of Representatives each appoints four of the 12 Commonwealth trustees. Additional non-voting trustees include 14 special trustees and additional emeritus trustees selected by the board. Non-voting ex-officio members include the governor of Pennsylvania, the secretary of the Commonwealth of Pennsylvania, the chief executive of Allegheny County, and the mayor of Pittsburgh. There are three or more regular meetings of the Board of Trustees per year.

The Board of Trustees selects the university's chancellor, who doubles as the chief academic officer and the chief executive of the university as well as serving as an ex officio voting member of the board of trustees. The chancellor is delegated with general administrative, academic, and management authority over the university. Under the chancellor are the provost and senior vice chancellor, the senior vice chancellor for health sciences, the deans of the various schools, the presidents of the regional campuses, department chairs, and the directors of university centers and institutes. The university is accredited by the Middle States Association of Colleges and Schools.

== Academics ==
Throughout its history, Pitt has been committed to a liberal arts education with a curriculum in the arts, sciences, and humanities. Pitt also has emphasized undergraduate research experience and opportunities such as co-ops and internships. Undergraduate degrees can be earned as Bachelor of Arts, Bachelor of Science, and Bachelor of Philosophy. Along with providing certificate programs, graduate level master's, professional, and doctoral degrees are also awarded. Pitt has also initiated a university-wide Outside the Classroom Curriculum (OCC) that includes a structured series of extracurricular programs and experiences designed to complement students' academic studies and help develop personal attributes and professional skills. Students who complete the OCC requirements receive an OCC "transcript" and a green cord of distinction to wear at commencement. Pitt offers free workshops and certification programs such as a pedagogy certification badge and a semester-long public education mentorship program. Distinguished undergraduate programs are offered through the David C. Frederick Honors College.

The freshman level entry schools include the Dietrich School of Arts and Sciences, the College of Business Administration, the Swanson School of Engineering, and the School of Nursing.

=== Undergraduate admissions ===
Undergraduate admissions statistics
- 2022 entering class
- Admit rate: 49.1
- Yield rate: 16.8

Test scores middle 50%
- SAT Total: 1280–1470 (among 47% of FTFs)
- ACT Composite: 28–33 (among 16% of FTFs)

The 2022 annual ranking of U.S. News & World Report categorizes University of Pittsburgh as "more selective". For the Class of 2026 (enrolled fall 2022), Pitt received 53,062 applications and accepted 26,077 (49.1%). Of those accepted, 4,399 enrolled, a yield rate (the percentage of accepted students who choose to attend the university) of 16.8%. Pitt's freshman retention rate is 93.4%, with 84.3% going on to graduate within six years.

The university started test-optional admissions with the Fall 2021 incoming class in response to the COVID-19 pandemic and has extended this through Fall 2025. Of the 49% of enrolled freshmen in 2021 who submitted SAT scores; the middle 50 percent Composite scores were 1250–1470. Of the 16% of the incoming freshman class who submitted ACT scores; the middle 50 percent Composite score was between 28 and 33.

Pitt is a college-sponsor of the National Merit Scholarship Program and sponsored 3 Merit Scholarship awards in 2020. In the 2020–2021 academic year, 10 freshman students were National Merit Scholars.

Fall First-Time Freshman Statistics
| | 2024 | 2023 | 2022 | 2021 | 2020 | 2019 | 2018 | 2017 |
|---|---|---|---|---|---|---|---|---|
| Applicants | 60,898 | 58,416 | 53,072 | 34,656 | 32,549 | 32,091 | 29,857 | 27,679 |
| Admits | 35,372 | 29,034 | 26,079 | 23,109 | 20,791 | 18,180 | 17,696 | 16,528 |
| Admit rate | 58.1 | 49.7 | 49.1 | 66.7 | 63.9 | 56.7 | 59.3 | 59.7 |
| Enrolled | 4,590 | 4,549 | 4,390 | 4,875 | 4,230 | 4,026 | 4,126 | 4,019 |
| Yield rate | 13.0 | 15.7 | 16.8 | 21.1 | 20.3 | 22.1 | 23.3 | 24.3 |
| ACT composite* (out of 36) | 29-33 (10%^{†}) | 29-33 (10%^{†}) | 29–33 (16%^{†}) | 28–33 (16%^{†}) | 28–32 (33%^{†}) | 28–33 (34%^{†}) | 28–33 (41%^{†}) | 27–32 (50%^{†}) |
| SAT composite* (out of 1600) | 1280-1460 (40%^{†}) | 1270-1450 (40%^{†}) | 1280–1470 (49%^{†}) | 1250–1470 (49%^{†}) | 1243–1420 (81%^{†}) | 1260–1440 (83%^{†}) | 1270–1430 (81%^{†}) | 1240–1420 (78%^{†}) |
* middle 50% range^{†} percentage of first-time freshmen who chose to submit

=== International studies ===
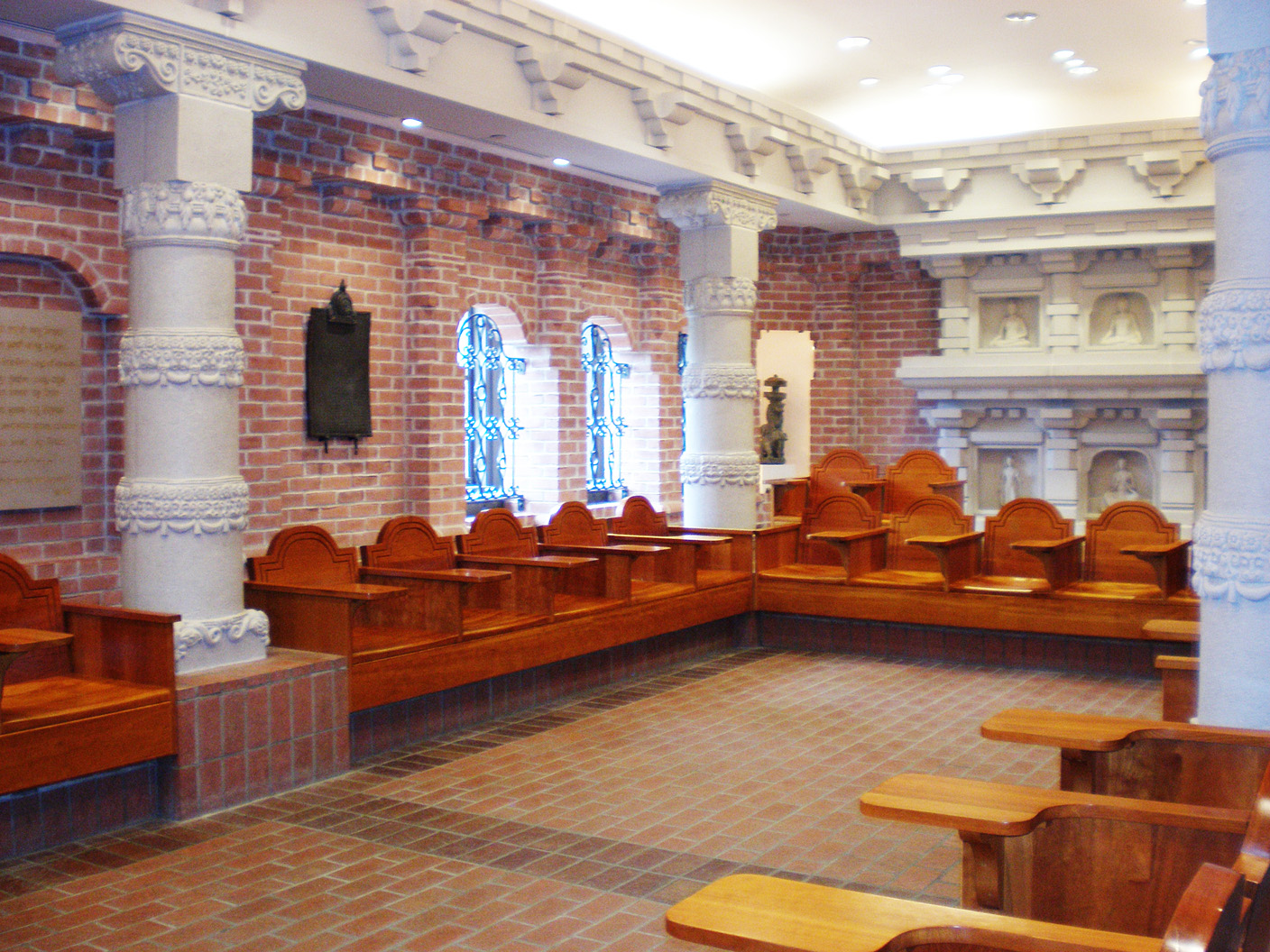
The Indian Classroom, one of 31 Nationality Rooms in the Cathedral of Learning

The university's historic emphasis on international studies is physically present in its collection of 31 Nationality Rooms on the first and third floors of the Cathedral of Learning. Pitt is also one of the country's leading producers of both Fulbright scholars and Peace Corps volunteers, and one of fewer than 20 American universities to claim five or more area studies programs that have been competitively designated as National Resource Centers by the U.S. Department of Education.

Pitt's National Resource Centers include Asian, European, Latin American, Russian and East European, and Global studies, as well as Pitt's International Business Center. In addition, Pitt's Asian Studies Center has been awarded status as a Confucius Institute by the Chinese Ministry of Education. Further, Pitt is home to one of just ten European Union Centers of Excellence in the U.S., funded by the European Commission.

The University Center for International Studies (UCIS) coordinates international education curricula, centers on topical specializations in international studies, and the centers for area studies, including the National Resource Centers, among existing faculty and departments throughout the university. It does not confer degrees, but awards certificates of attainment to degree candidates in the university's schools and also operates certificate programs in African Studies (undergraduate) and in Global Studies (undergraduate & graduate). UCIS also operates the Study Abroad Office, Nationality Rooms and Intercultural Exchange Programs.

Pitt's study abroad program, under the auspices of UCIS, helps to facilitate student study in over a hundred different countries, and oversees a variety of programs including the Panther Programs, which are course taught abroad that have been developed and are accompanied by faculty of the university; two-way exchange agreements with foreign institutions; and Pitt-recognized, third-party exchange programs. The university also offers several study abroad scholarships, including those through the Nationality Rooms program. In addition, following the decision to end a 24-year sponsorship of the Semester at Sea program due to academic, administrative and safety concerns, Pitt has created a Multi-region Academic Program (PittMAP) that involves international travel, accompanied by university faculty, to three different continents for the comparative study of one of six rotating global study themes. Further, Pitt's Swanson School of Engineering has also established a joint engineering institute and program with Sichuan University in Chengdu, and Pitt's School of Medicine has established an exchange program for biomedical research students with Tsinghua University in Beijing, China.

=== Rankings and reputation ===
Academic rankings

National
- Forbes: 143
- U.S. News & World Report: 69
- Washington Monthly: 116
- WSJ/College Pulse: 83

Global
- ARWU: 90
- QS: 281 (tie)
- THE: 141 (tie)
- U.S. News & World Report: 52 (tie)

In its 2025 rankings, U.S. News & World Report ranked Pitt tied of 69th out of 436 among national universities, and 52nd out of 2,250 universities in their ranking of best global universities.

The 2025 Wall Street Journal/Times Higher Education college rankings of World Universities ranked Pitt 141st overall. Pitt ranked 75th worldwide in the 2024 Center for World University Rankings. Pitt also ranked 90th worldwide in the 2024 Academic Ranking of World Universities. Pitt ranked 275th globally in the 2025 QS World University Rankings.

Pitt ranks 25th of all universities in the world for the impact and performance of its 2016 scientific public publications according to the Performance Ranking of Scientific Papers for World Universities produced by the Higher Education Evaluation and Accreditation Council of Taiwan (HEEACT). Pitt ranks as the 42nd best higher education research institution worldwide according to SCImago Institutions Rankings' 2016 World Report.

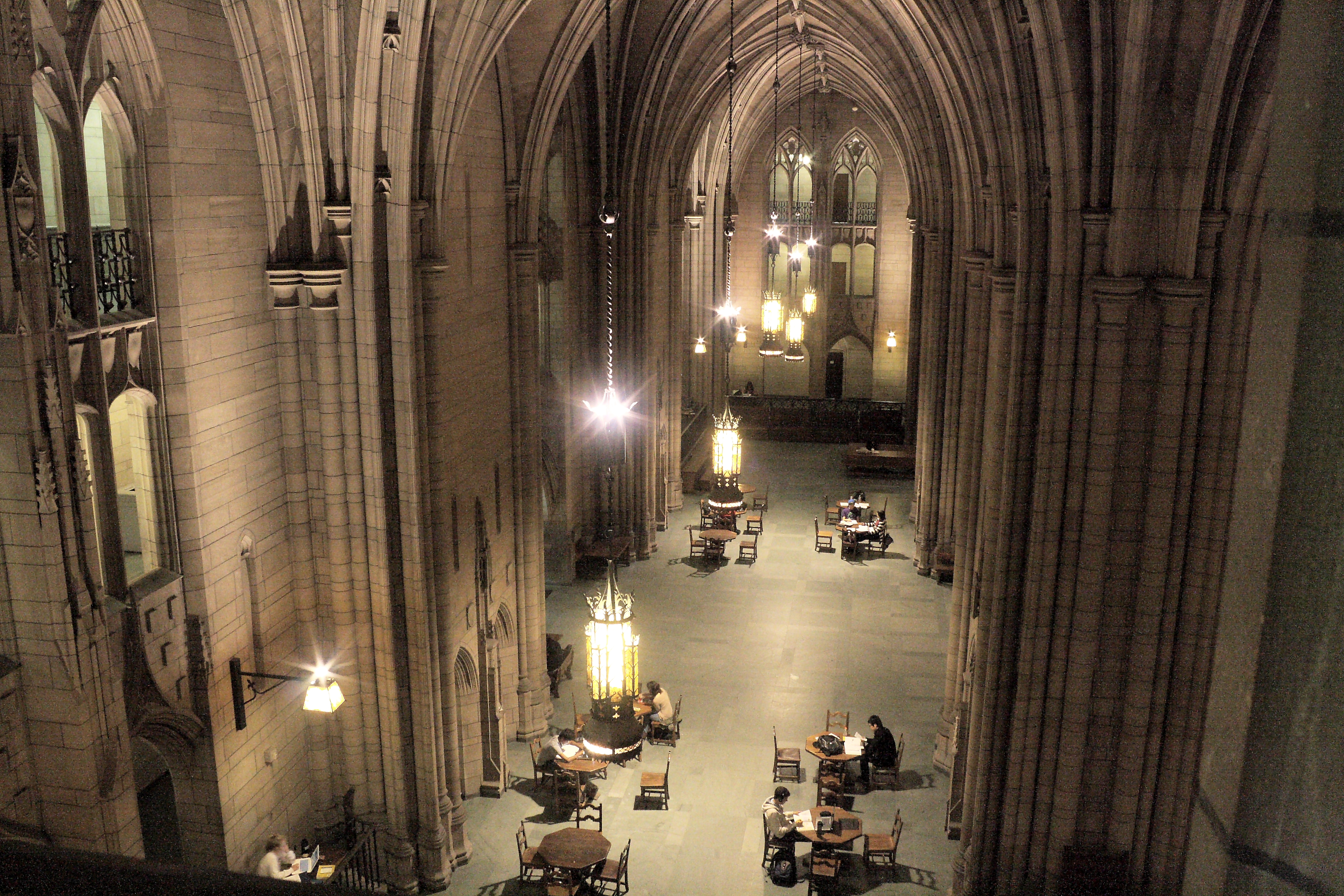
The 52 ft (16 m) high, half acre (2,000 m^{2}) Commons Room of the Cathedral of Learning serves as a major study and event space for the university and its students.

Pitt has been listed as a "Public Ivy" at various times, a term coined by Richard Moll in his 1985 book, which included the University of Pittsburgh. More recently, Pitt was listed among Forbes' twenty "New Ivies" in 2025.

Pitt's law school was ranked tied for 91st in the U.S. in 2025 by U.S. News & World Report.

The University of Pittsburgh School of Social Work's MSW program was ranked tied for 12th in the U.S. by U.S. News & World Report in 2024.

=== Scholars ===
Pitt students and faculty have regularly won national and international scholarships and fellowship awards, including eight Rhodes Scholarships and ten Marshall Scholarships. In 2007, Pitt was one of only nine universities, and the only public university, to claim both Rhodes and Marshall Scholars. Since 1995, Pitt undergraduates have also won a total of five Truman Scholarships, seven Udall Scholarships, a Churchill Scholarship, a Gates Cambridge Scholarship, 43 Goldwater Scholarships, 23 Boren Scholarships, and three Mellon Humanities Fellowships.

Pitt is also a leading producer of Fulbright scholars, placing in the top 20 among all universities for total number of student Fulbright scholars.

Pitt alumni have won awards such as the Nobel Peace Prize, the Nobel Prize in medicine, the Pulitzer Prize for fiction, the Shaw Prize in medicine, the Albany Prize in medicine, the Fritz Medal in engineering, the Templeton Prize, and the Grainger Challenge Prize for sustainability.

== Research ==
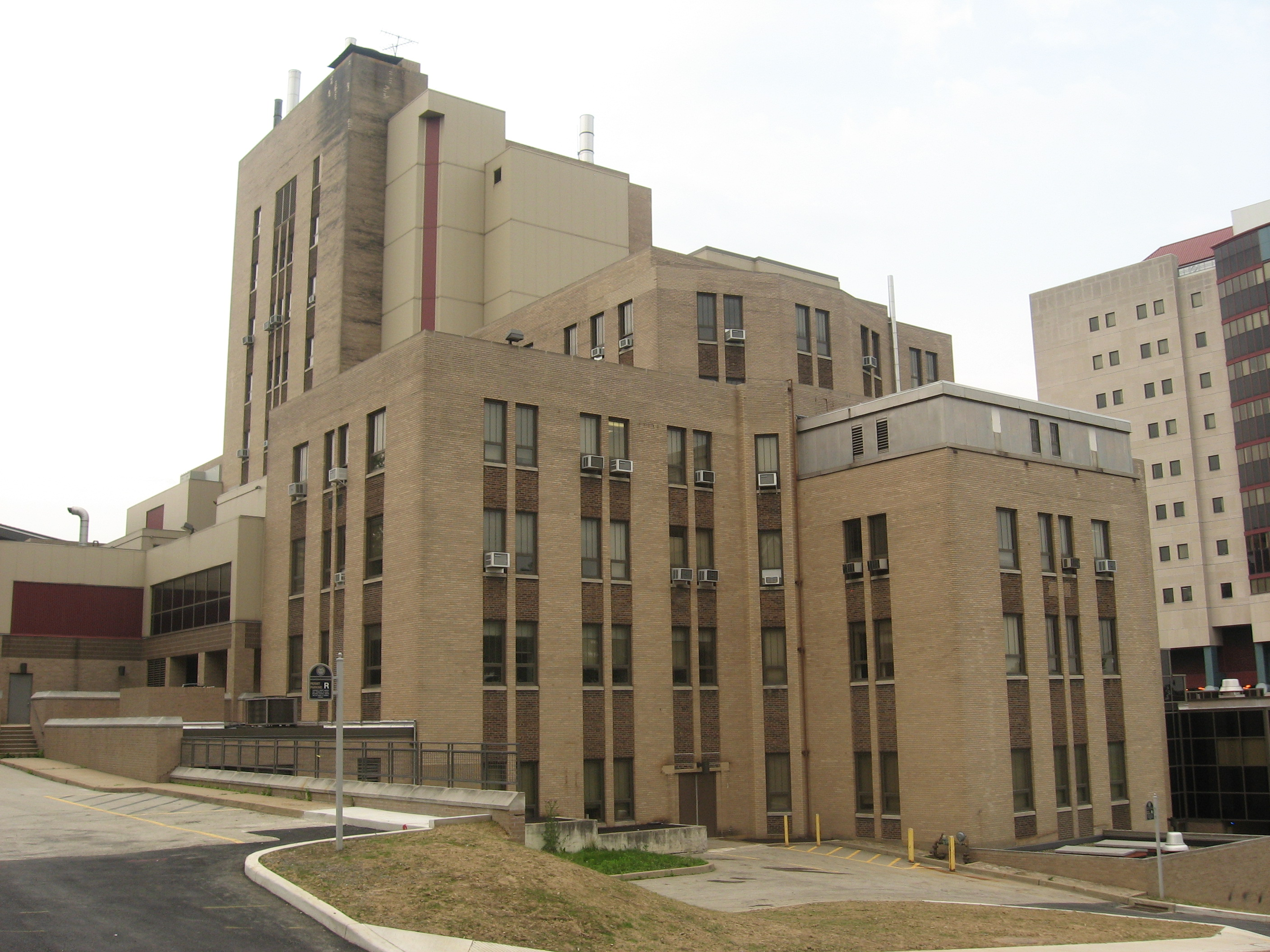
Salk Hall, where Jonas Salk's team performed the research that led to the first polio vaccine, is also the home of the School of Dental Medicine and School of Pharmacy.

Pitt is a member of the Association of American Universities. The National Science Foundation ranked Pitt 18th among American universities for research and development expenditures in 2021 with $1.13 billion. Pitt ranked in the top 25 of all universities in the world for the impact and performance of its scientific public publications, including in the top ten for clinical medicine, according to the Performance Ranking of Scientific Papers for World Universities produced by the Higher Education Evaluation and Accreditation Council of Taiwan. Pitt is also ranked 29th in the world based on Essential Science Indicators according to the Research Center for Chinese Science Evaluation of Wuhan University. Pitt places much emphasis on undergraduate research and has integrated such research experience as a key component of its undergraduate experience.

Pitt is a major center of biomedical research; in FY 2013, it ranked sixth in the nation in competitive peer-reviewed NIH funding allocations, and the University of Pittsburgh Medical Center ranked tenth among hospitals nationwide by USNews in 2013.

Pitt neighbors the campus of Carnegie Mellon University (CMU), and in some cases, buildings of the two universities are intermingled. This helps to facilitate myriad academic and research collaborations between the two schools, including such projects as the Pittsburgh Supercomputing Center, the Pittsburgh Life Sciences Greenhouse, the Immune Modeling Center, the Center for the Neural Basis of Cognition, the University of Pittsburgh Cancer Institute, as well as the National Science Foundation-supported Pittsburgh Science of Learning Center. Further, the universities also offer multiple dual and joint degree programs such as the Medical Scientist Training Program, the Molecular Biophysics and Structural Biology Graduate Program, and the Law and Business Administration program. Some professors hold joint professorships between the two schools, and students at each university may take classes at the other (with appropriate approvals). Pitt students and faculty also have access to the CMU library system, as well as the Carnegie Library of Pittsburgh, through the Oakland Library Consortium. The two universities also co-host academic conferences, such as the 2012 Second Language Research Forum.

== Student life ==
Student body composition as of May 2, 2022
| Race and ethnicity | Total |
|---|---|
| White | 67% |
| Asian | 12% |
| Hispanic | 6% |
| Other (Note: Other consists of Multiracial Americans & those who prefer to not say.) | 6% |
| Black | 5% |
| Foreign national | 4% |
Economic diversity
| Low-income (Note: The percentage of students who received an income-based federal Pell grant intended for low-income students.) | 14% |
| Affluent (Note: The percentage of students who are a part of the American middle class at the bare minimum.) | 86% |

=== Housing ===
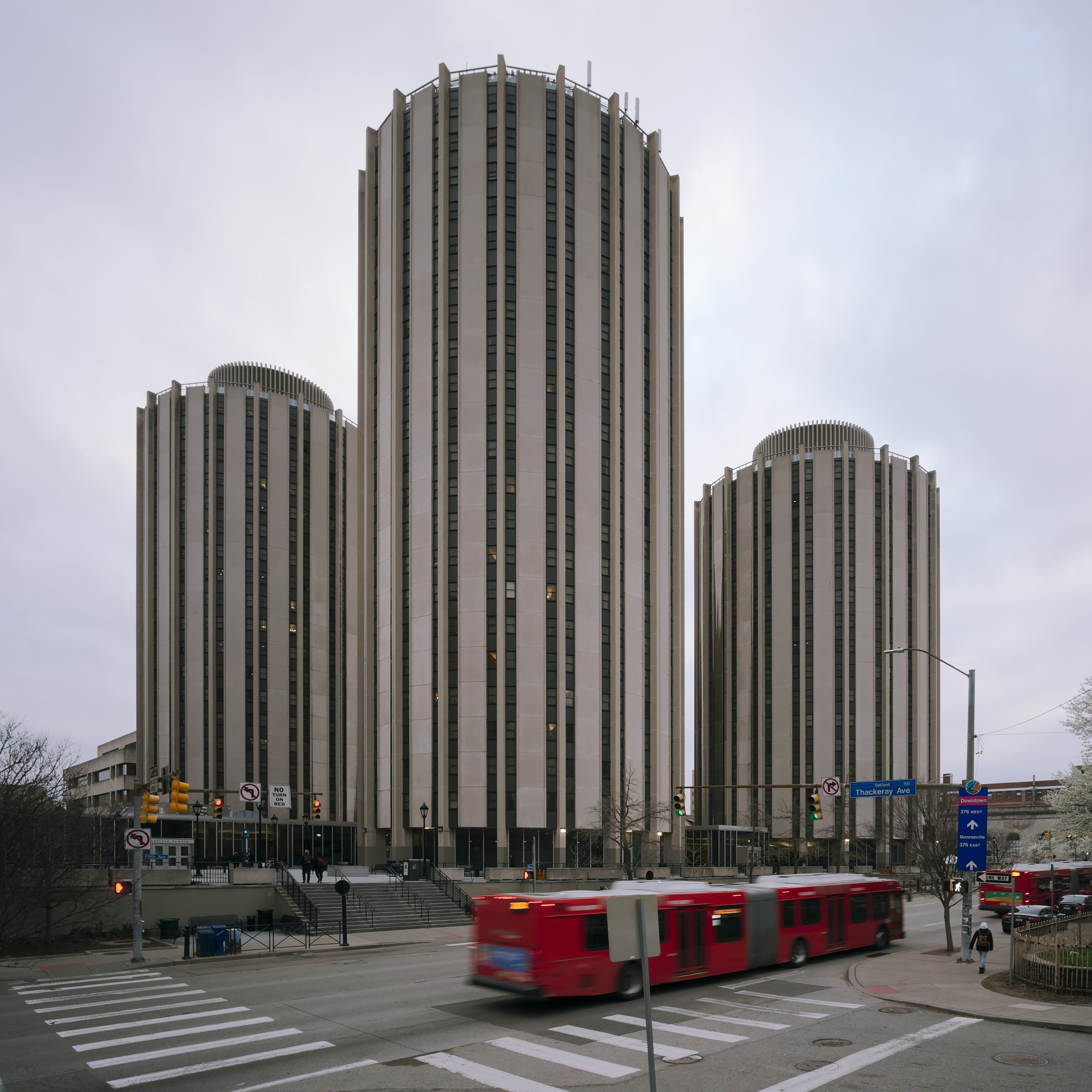
Litchfield Towers, Pitt's largest and tallest residence hall

Undergraduate student housing comprises both traditional residence halls and apartment style housing. On the lower campus, the three cylindrical towers of the Litchfield Towers complex houses the most students on campus and contains the primary dining facility for the university. The Schenley Quadrangle, originally serving as one of city's most desirably luxury apartment complexes, comprises five separate residence halls: Amos, Brackenridge, Bruce, Holland, and McCormick. Bruce Hall houses many Honors College and Living and Learning Community (LLC) students, Holland Hall formerly served as an all female residence, and Amos Hall serves as the primary home of the university's sororities with each floor being occupied by a different Greek organization. Ruskin Hall is located near Clapp Hall and the biological complex. Completed in 2013, Nordenberg Hall is the newest residence hall houses freshmen. Forbes Hall, located on Forbes Avenue, houses mainly freshmen involved in LLCs (Living Learning Communities). Lothrop Hall, originally built as a nursing student residence, houses students on the medical center complex. Bouquet Gardens offers garden style apartments mostly to upperclassmen. The Forbes Craig Apartments serve as the primary residence for Honors College students.

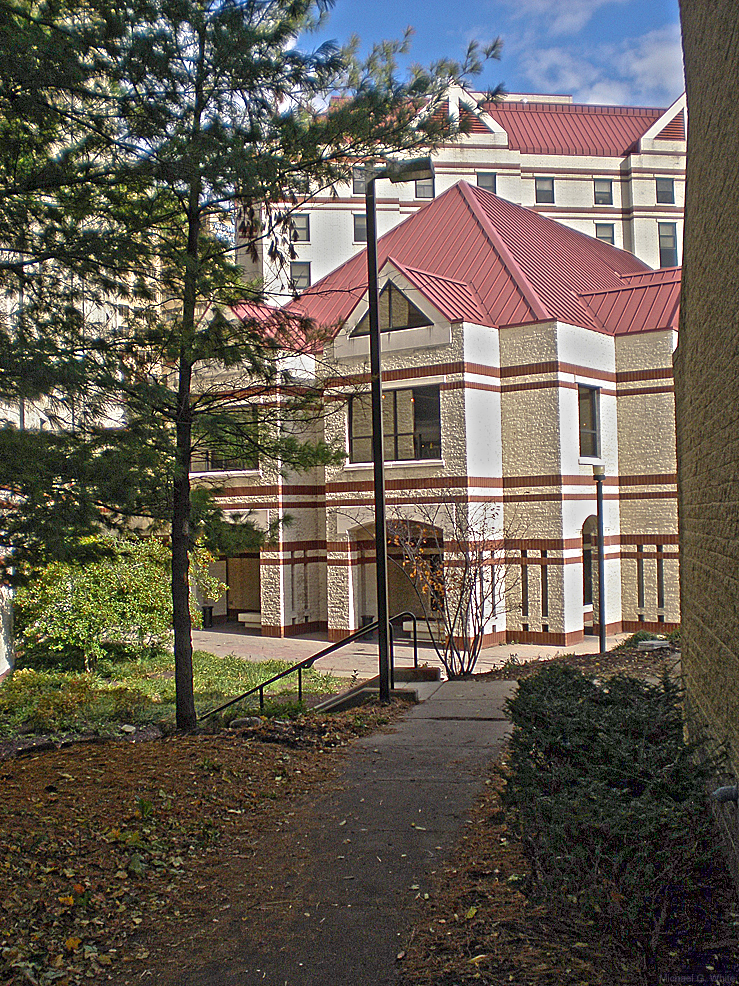
Sutherland Hall on the upper campus is named for legendary Pitt football coach Jock Sutherland.

The upper campus houses Sutherland Hall, home of several Living Learning Communities, as well as Panther Hall and Irvis Hall, which mainly house upperclassmen. Various fraternity housing is also found on the upper campus, as well as the Darragh Street Apartments which house medical students within a short walk to medical school's Scaife Hall.

Many students, especially upperclassmen, also choose to live off campus in the nearby South Oakland neighborhood in both university and non-university owned apartments.

=== Traditions ===
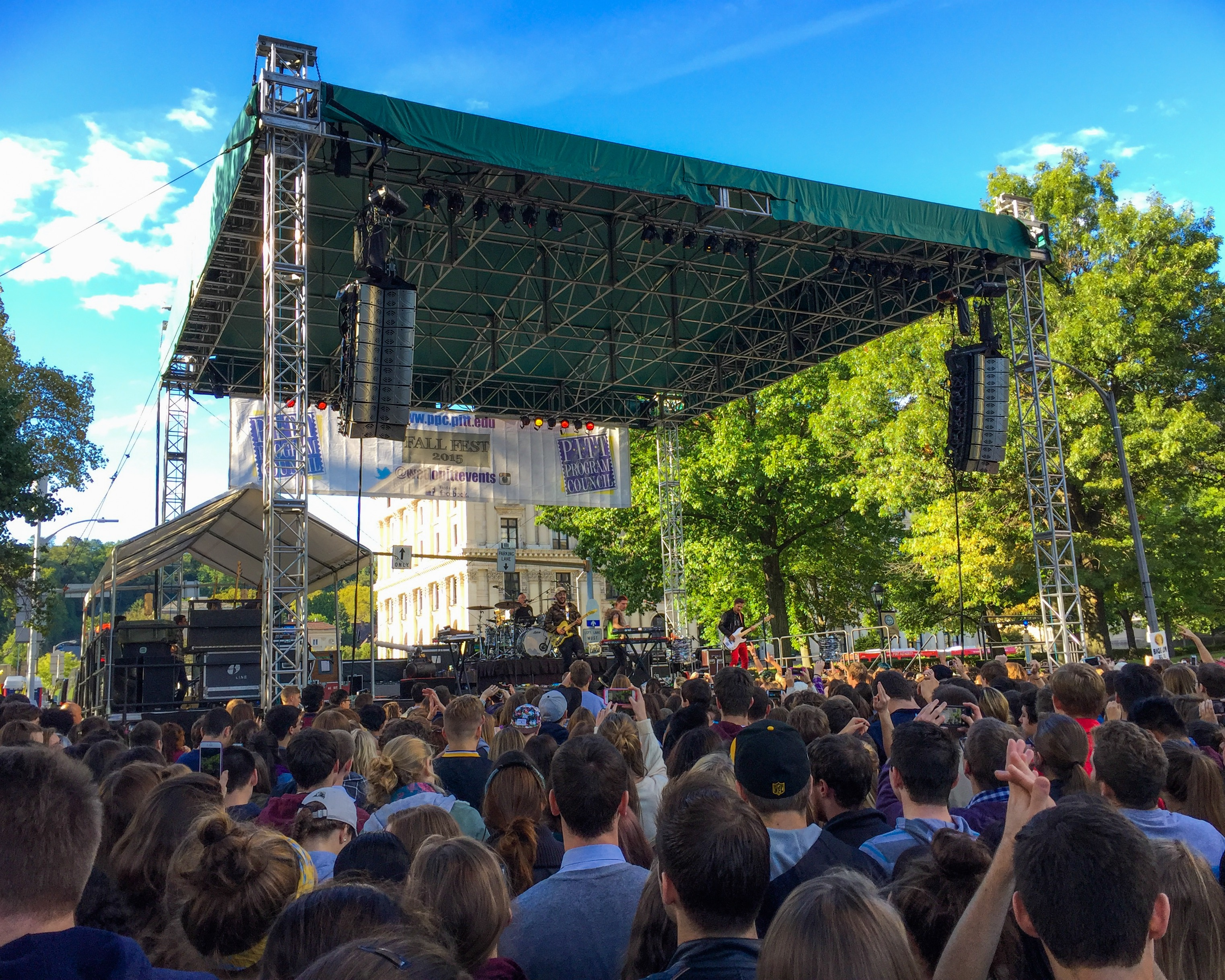
Rock band Walk the Moon performs at Fall Fest 2015

Several traditions have become part of student life at Pitt over the years. One of the oldest traditions is "Lantern Night", an annual ceremony that serves as a formal induction for freshman to university life. The tradition of sliding or stepping on the former home plate of Forbes Field embedded in the floor of Posvar Hall is performed by students in search of some good luck. Another good luck tradition involves rubbing the nose of the Millennium Panther outside the William Pitt Union prior to exams. Originated by students seeking good luck on exams, this tradition has further grown into one that is used by the wider university community when seeking general good fortune, particularly prior to football games or other athletic contests, and was featured in a national television advertisement for the 2012 Hyundai Tucson automobile. A romantic tradition involves the legend stating that if lovers kiss on the steps of Heinz Memorial Chapel, they are then destined to be married there. Perhaps the most prestigious tradition involves the Omicron Delta Kappa Walk, a stone walkway between the Cathedral of Learning and Heinz Chapel that contains the engraved names of Pitt's Omicron Delta Kappa Senior of the Year award winners.

Annual traditional events include "Fall Fest", and in the spring, "Bigelow Bash". These festivals are held by the Pitt Program Council between the William Pitt Union and the Cathedral of Learning and involve a range of activities, novelties, and bands. Related to graduation, there is Honors Convocation, where awards and recognition are bestowed upon students, faculty, alumni, and staff throughout the schools and departments of the university. Also, the "Panther Sendoff" is a free annual reception typically held in Alumni Hall to congratulate each year's graduating class and wish them well. A free event open to the public, the Nationality Rooms Open House occurs on a Sunday in early December each year in the Cathedral of Learning and involves the presentation of the rooms decorated in traditional holiday styles, day-long performances of dance and song by various ethnic groups, and food and crafts from many of the nationality room's committees.

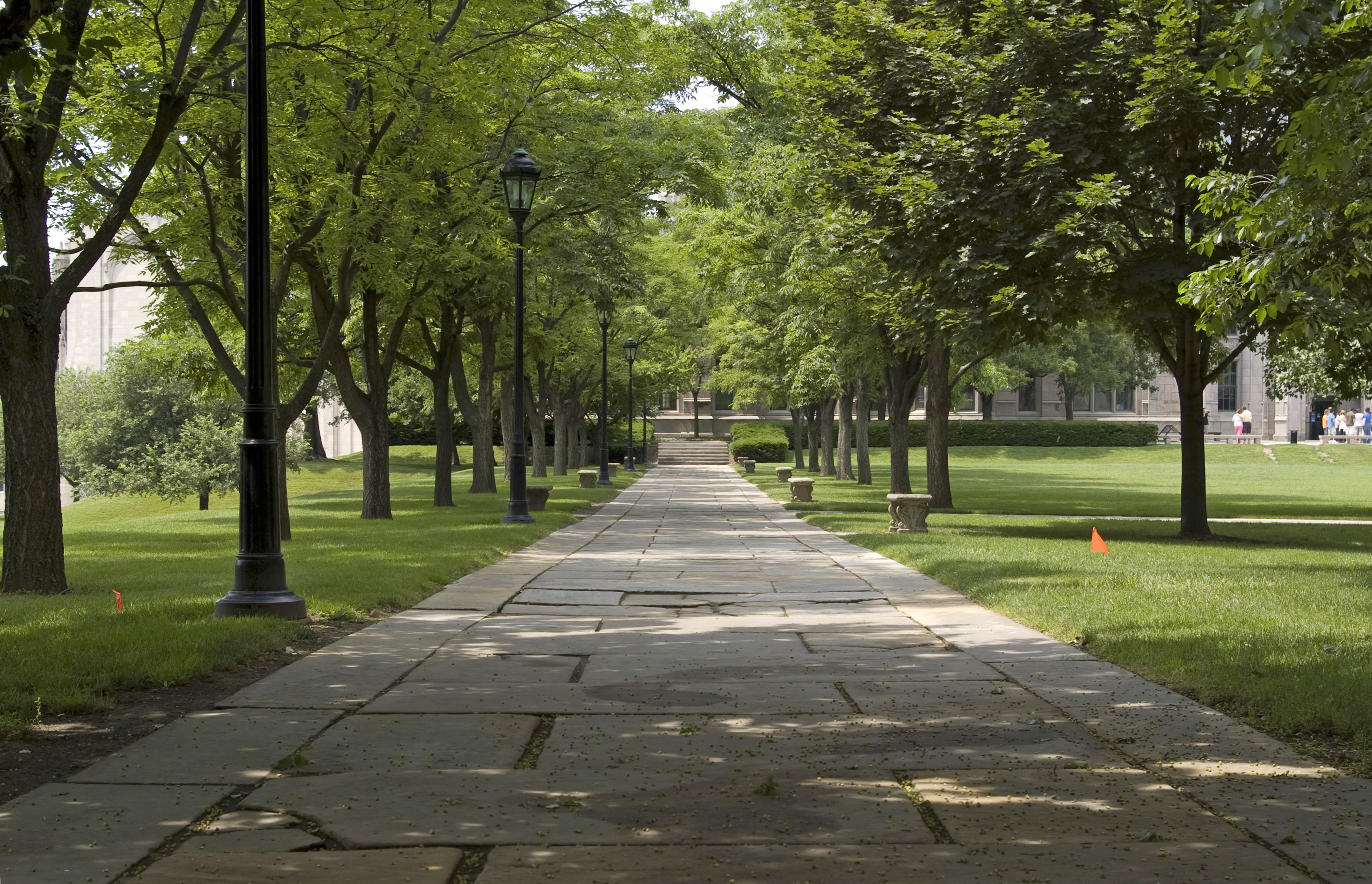
Varsity Walk

Traditions related to athletics include the "Victory Lights", where golden flood lights illuminate the top of the Cathedral of Learning after every football victory and select other athletic achievements. The Annual Bonfire and Pep Rally which is hosted by the Pitt Program Council and is held prior to a select football game. Held on the lawn of the Cathedral of Learning, it often involves the band, cheerleaders, football team, visiting dignitaries, and giveaways. Homecoming, which revolves around another home football game each year, includes a traditional fireworks and a laser-light display between the William Pitt Union and the Cathedral of Learning. The Varsity Walk, a walkway between the Cathedral of Learning and Heinz Memorial Chapel, is carved each year the names of former Pitt athletes (each year since 1950) who have promoted the university through their athletic (Panther Award) or academic (Blue-Gold Award) achievements.

"Greek Week" is a yearlong initiative for the Greek organizations on campus to raise money for different charitable organizations through different events. The two biggest events each year are the Pitt Dance Marathon and Greek Sing. Yearlong fundraising activities are also held to support such charitable organizations such as the Ronald McDonald House, Make a Wish Foundation, University of Pittsburgh Cancer Institute, and the Pittsburgh Food Bank. "E-Week" is a spring celebration organized by the Engineer Student Council for a week-long series of activities and competitions to demonstrate engineering skills and foster a spirit of camaraderie. Activities include games such as Monopoly, Ingenuity, Jeopardy, Assassins, and include a talent show, relay race, mini-Olympics, and blood drive. The festivities reach climax with a parade on Friday, a soapbox derby on Saturday, and the "e-ball finale" on Saturday evening. Each year, a unique theme is chosen. Each engineering department competes against the others, while some smaller departments join forces.

=== Pitt Arts ===
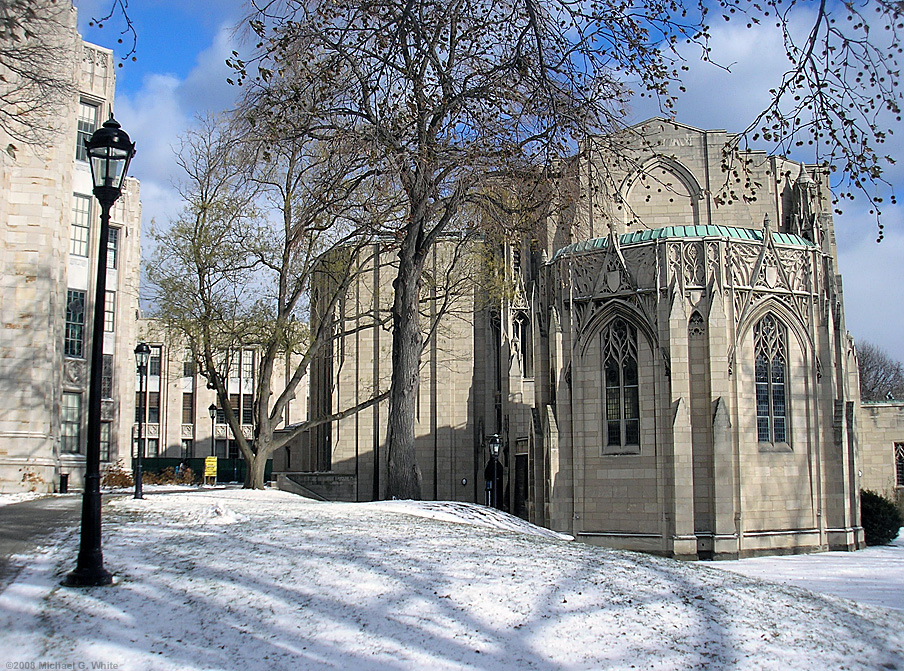
Pitt's Stephen Foster Memorial contains two theaters

Pitt Arts is a program founded by the university in 1997 to encourage students to explore and connect to the art and cultural opportunities of the City of Pittsburgh via three programs. Art Encounters provides trips to arts events for undergrads that include free tickets, transportation, a catered reception, and encounters with international artists and thinkers. Free Visits grants undergrad and grad students free admission using their Pitt IDs to the Carnegie Museum of Art, Carnegie Museum of Natural History, Senator John Heinz History Center, Phipps Conservatory, Mattress Factory, and the Andy Warhol Museum.

=== Student theater ===
Various student theater groups convene at Pitt. University of Pittsburgh Stages is the production company of the Department of Theatre Arts which puts public student performances of classic masterpieces, contemporary productions, and student-directed labs. It also runs the Shakespeare-in-the-Schools which tours classic theater for K-12 students throughout the Pittsburgh area. Friday Nite Improvs, Pittsburgh's longest-running theatre show, was started in 1989 by graduate theatre students. It takes place weekly inside the Cathedral of Learning's studio theatre. The Redeye Theatre Project is a festival of one-act plays cast, written, and rehearsed in 24 hours. Pitt Musical Theater Club provides undergraduates the opportunity to perform in student-directed variety shows and musicals. The club was founded in 2009.

=== Student music ===
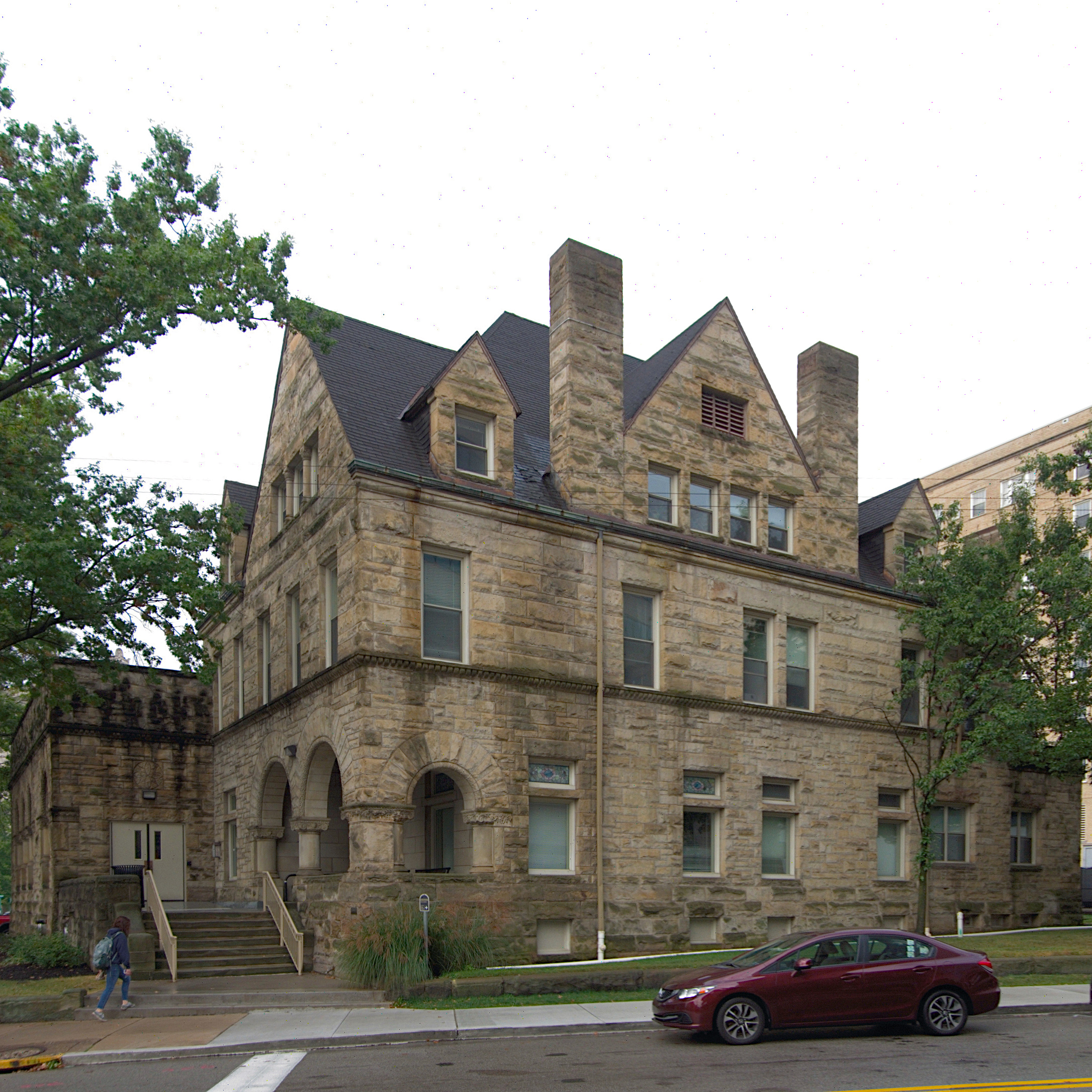
The Music Building once served as home to the original studio for Mr. Rogers' Neighborhood.

The University of Pittsburgh has three University recognized choirs, in founding order they are listed below:

The Pitt Men's Glee Club, founded in 1890, is the oldest extracurricular club on campus.

The University of Pittsburgh Women's Choral Ensemble, founded in 1927, is open to all women of the university including undergraduates, graduate students, and staff. The ensemble leads the traditional lamplighter processional each fall and performs repertory ranging from traditional sacred and secular classics to international folk songs, popular music, and show tunes.

Heinz Chapel Choir is an internationally known a cappella choir consisting entirely of Pitt students that has been performing for over 70 years.

Pitt Pendulums, founded in 1996, is a co-ed a cappella group, the oldest a cappella group on campus. Other a cappella groups on campus include C Flat Run, a co-ed group; Pittch Please, an all-male group; Pitches and Tones, a co-ed group; The Songburghs, a co-ed group; and Sounds Like Treble, an all-female group. All groups on campus regularly perform in various on and off-campus functions and are regular competitors in the ICCA's, the International Championship of Collegiate A Cappella. Most recently, The Songburghs won first place at the ICCA Central Quarterfinal on February 2, 2019. They also went on to place third at the next round, the ICCA Central Semifinal at the University at Buffalo on March 30, 2019. Carpathian Ensemble, founded within the Department of Music in 1786, performs Gypsy, Klezmer, Armenian, Moldavian, Ukrainian, and Macedonian music. The University Gamelan, established in 1995, is the largest Sundanese gamelan program in the U.S. and has sponsored an artist-in-residency program each year since 1998.

The University of Pittsburgh Orchestra performs several concerts and consists of music students, students from the university at large, faculty, staff, and members of the metropolitan community. The orchestra performs not only works of the standard art music literature, but also new works of student composers. Pitt Jazz Ensemble, founded in 1969 by saxophonist Dr. Davis, has performed internationally. Pitt African Music and Dance Ensemble, founded in 1983 by a Ghanaian ethnomusicologist Willie O. Anku, specializes in music and dances from Africa. Pitt Band, founded in 1911, is the varsity marching band of the University of Pittsburgh.

=== Student media ===
- WPTS-FM is a non-commercial radio station owned by the University of Pittsburgh, and offers a mix of student-run programming. The station operates at 92.1 MHz with an ERP of 16 watts, and is licensed to Pittsburgh.
- Jurist is the world's only law-school-based, comprehensive, legal news and research service staffed by a mostly volunteer team. It is led by law professor Bernard Hibbitts at the University of Pittsburgh School of Law.
- The Pitt News is an independent, student-written, and student-managed newspaper for the university's Oakland (main) campus. It was founded in 1908.

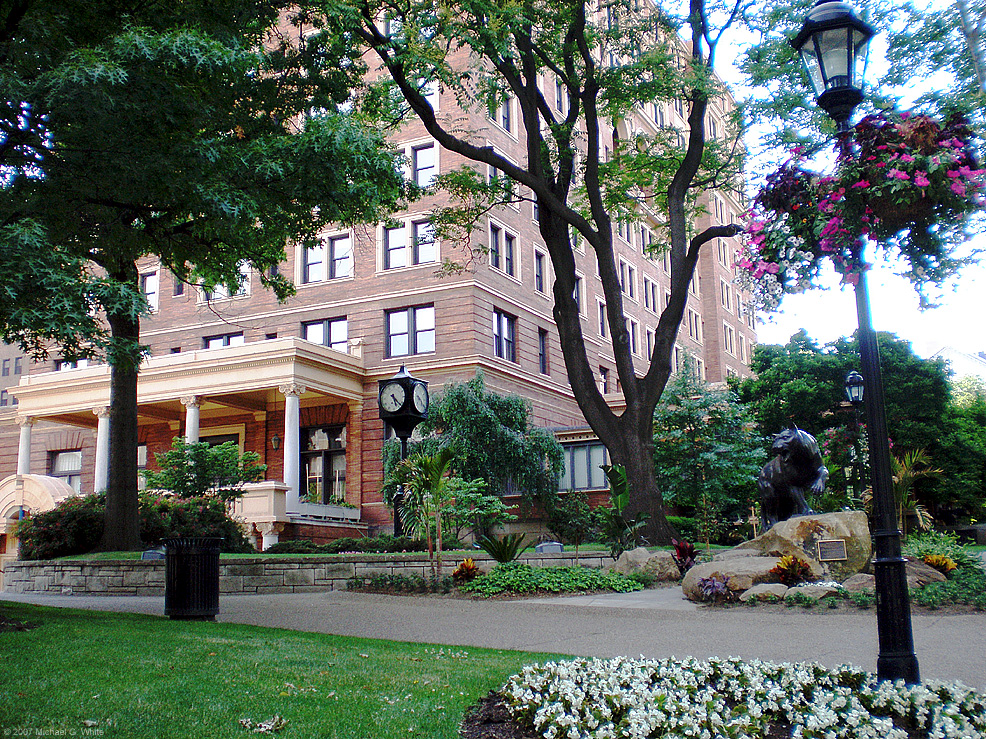
Student media and other organizations are largely headquartered within the William Pitt Union, seen here with the Millennium Panther.

- The Pittiful News is an independent, student-founded, student-written, student-managed, and student-produced satirical and humor newspaper. It comes out on during the school year in print and throughout the entire calendar year online.
- UPTV (University of Pittsburgh Television) is a student-managed, student-produced, closed-circuit television station. Students living in campus residence halls or university operated-housing can view programming on Channel 21.
- Three Rivers Review and Collision are undergraduate, bi-annual, literary journals publishing both poetry and prose.
- The Pittsburgh Undergraduate Review is a multidisciplinary journal showcasing undergraduate research.,
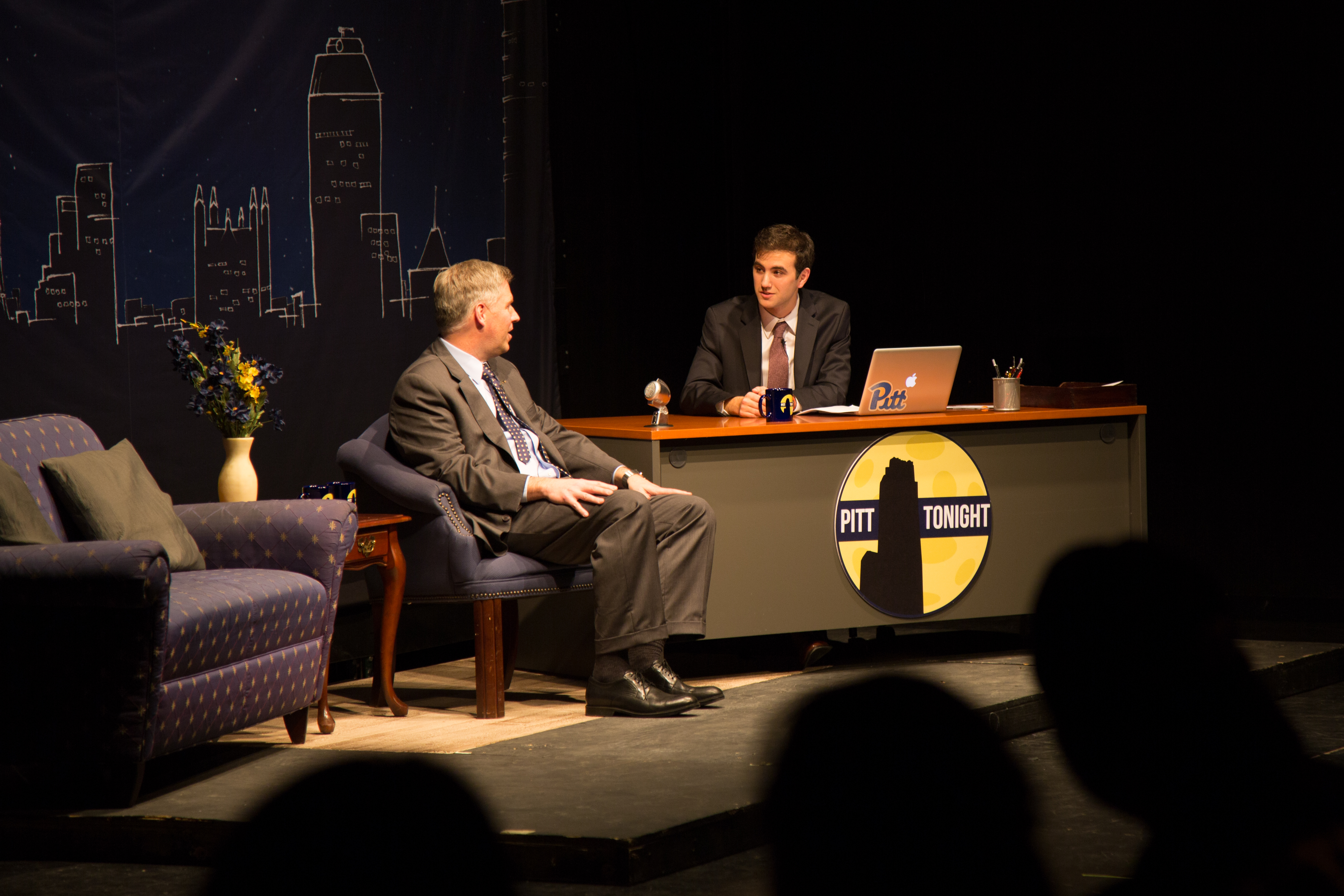
  Pitt Tonight earned the university its first College Emmy nominations in 2016.
- Pitt Political Review is a student-created, student-written publication of the David C. Frederick Honors College. PPR, as it is called, provides a venue for serious discussion of politics and policy issues in a nonpartisan way.
- Blackline is a student-created, student-written publication of the Black Action Society. Blackline features both news articles and creative pieces such as poetry to call attention to problems, programs, and activities that affect Black students at Pitt.
- The Original Magazine is a nonprofit, semiannual arts and culture publication based at, and partially funded by, the University of Pittsburgh, that aims to both bring and publicize accessible art and creative writing to Pittsburgh.
- The Pitt Maverick is an independent paper founded by conservative students.
- Pitt Tonight is an American college late-night talk show on the University of Pittsburgh campus. The show premiered on December 14, 2015, and is produced entirely by students. It is the first large-scale late night production on the school's campus – consisting of more than 70 staff members – with its creator Jesse Irwin serving as the first host. The program is taped once per month in front of a live studio audience. The show has been nominated for two Mid-Atlantic Emmy Awards, and won one College Broadcasters Inc. award for Best General Entertainment Program.

=== Student organizations ===
There are over 350 student clubs and organizations at the University of Pittsburgh. Some of the organizations are:

- Black Action Society is the recognized student organization for promoting the cultural, educational, political, and social needs of black students at the university. It comprises nine committees including the publication of the student-run publication BlackLine as well as community outreach, political action, and programing. BAS has hosted lectures by such figures as Cornel West, Spike Lee, and Carol Moseley Braun.
- Blue and Gold Society, founded in 1991, is a group of undergraduate student leaders chosen as liaisons between the student community and the Pitt Alumni Association.
- Catholic Newman Club, founded in 1915, is the third oldest existing student organization on campus. The club works in conjunction with the Pittsburgh Oratory of Saint Philip Neri and the Fellowship of Catholic University Students.
- Graduate and Professional Student Government (GPSG) is the student government that represents the interests of all graduate and professional students and serves as the umbrella organization for all of the graduate/professional school student governments. GPSG's mission is to ensure that the concerns of these students are heard and also provides services and programs such travel grants, legal and financial consulting, and social functions.
- Hillel is a pluralistic Jewish community that serves all Pitt undergraduates. Programs take place on campus and at the Hillel Jewish University Center at 4607 Forbes Avenue. Events include holiday, interfaith, Jewish education, social action, arts and cultural programming as well as no-fee weekly Shabbat services and dinner every Friday night.

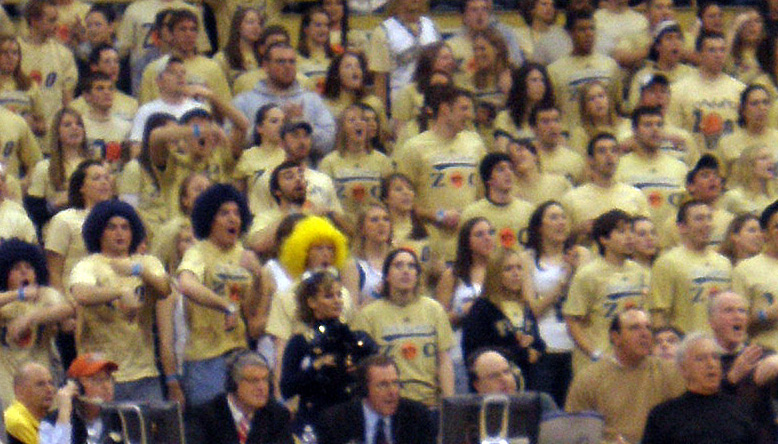
The Oakland Zoo, Pitt basketball's student cheering club

- Oakland Zoo, the student athletic cheering section, is an officially recognized student club. At over 2,000 members, it is the largest such group at the university. The group helps participate with the Athletic Department and Pitt Student Government Board in setting student ticket policy as well as organizing special student events.
- The Pitt Pathfinders, student recruiters employed by the Office of Admissions of Financial Aid. They recruit prospective students by giving campus tours, attending on-and-off campus recruitment programs, and by contacting admitted students through phone and the Internet. While Pathfinder is a paid position, it is also a student organization.
- Pitt Program Council is the all-campus programming organization at the university. Comprising eight student committees, a variety of programs and festivities are planned and sponsored including Fall Fest, Bigelow Bash, Homecoming Laser and Fireworks Show, as well as trips to New York City, Cedar Point, Spring break in Panama City Beach, FL. Other activities include art gallery exhibits, films, horseback riding, sports tournaments, lectures, fitness and dance classes, and Black and White Ball.
- Student Government Board (SGB) is the governing body that provides undergraduate students with representation to the university administration, presenting their needs, interests, and concerns. An important aspect of the SGB is allocation of a portion of the student activities fee, which provides money to over 500 student organizations at the University of Pittsburgh. SGB has three standing committees, 6 conditional committees, and one internal committee that address various aspects of campus life, including diversity, first-year involvement, wellness, and governmental relations.
- Quo Vadis is a student organization that conducts guided tours and interpretations of the Cathedral of Learning's 31 Nationality Rooms.
- Rainbow Alliance is a student advocacy group for gay, lesbian, bisexual, transgender, queer, and allied students. Among other activities, the group holds an annual drag show to raise money for Pittsburgh AIDS Task Force.
- William Pitt Debating Union is a co-curricular program and hub for a wide range of debating activities, including intercollegiate policy debate, public debate, and debate outreach. The program was 1981 National Debate Tournament champions, has qualified for the National Debate Tournament 40 times, and is one of the oldest organizations of its kind in the nation, growing from the university's Division of Public Speaking in 1912.
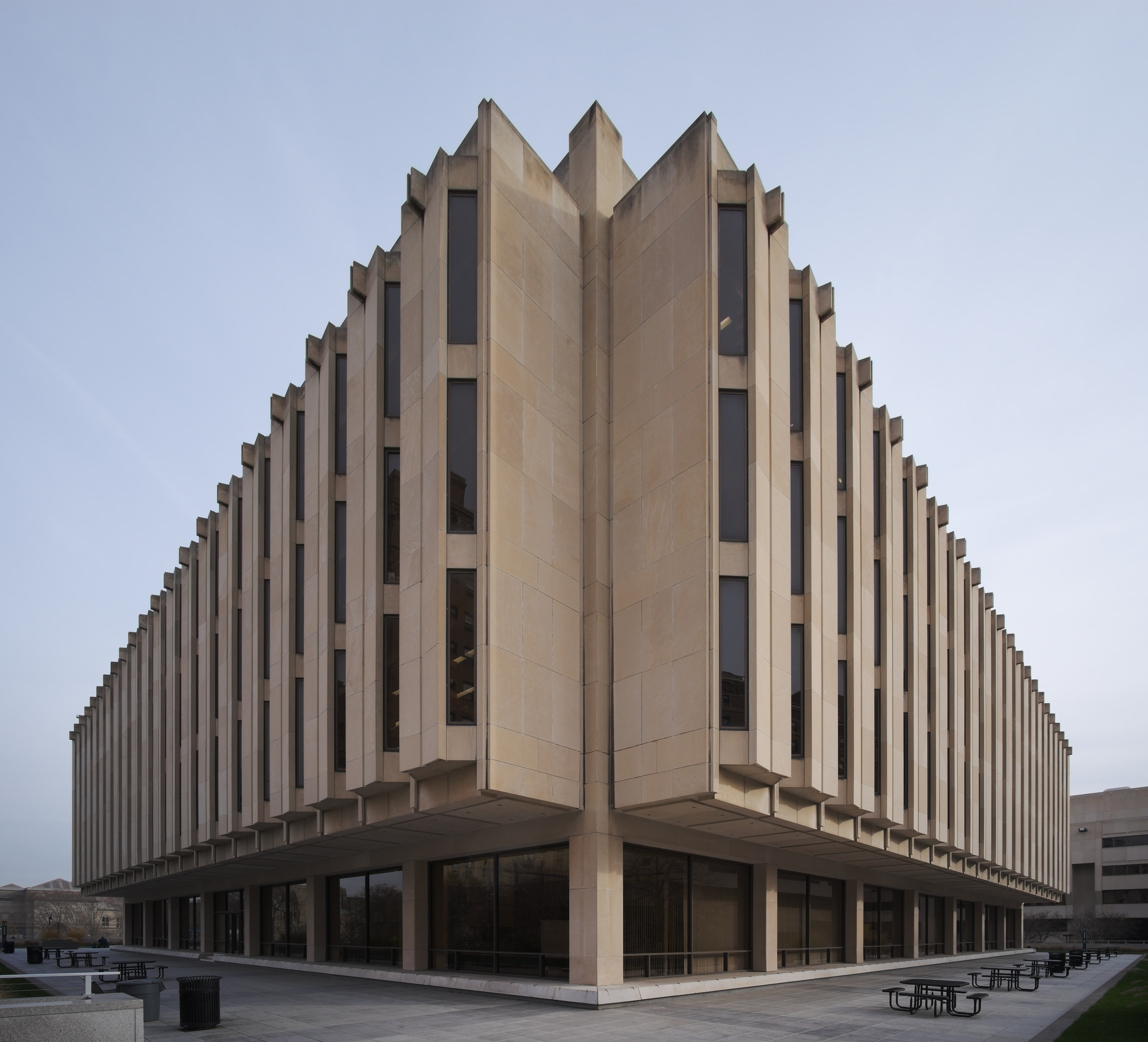
  Hillman Library

=== Student protests and activism ===
In April 2024, Pittsburgh University students joined other campuses in encampments and protests against the Israel–Hamas war. The protestors called for an end to the genocide in Gaza, for the university to divest financially from the "Israeli apartheid regime" and cut ties with all Israeli universities. CAIR-Pittsburgh called on the University of Pittsburgh to drop charges against students who protested against Israel's genocide in Gaza.

The protests continued into the next academic year, with faculty accusing the administration of racism because of the difference in response to the wars in Ukraine and Gaza.

=== Greek life ===
There are presently over 40 general, or social, fraternities and sororities on campus. The oldest men's fraternity, Phi Gamma Delta first held events in 1863, while the oldest women's group, Kappa Alpha Theta, was established in 1915. Additionally, a similar number of professional, service, and honor societies are present on campus. The oldest are the medical fraternity Phi Beta Pi, entering in 1891, and the dental fraternity Psi Omega, entering in 1897. The historically black fraternities Alpha Phi Alpha (1913) and Alpha Kappa Alpha (1918) came later.

== Athletics ==
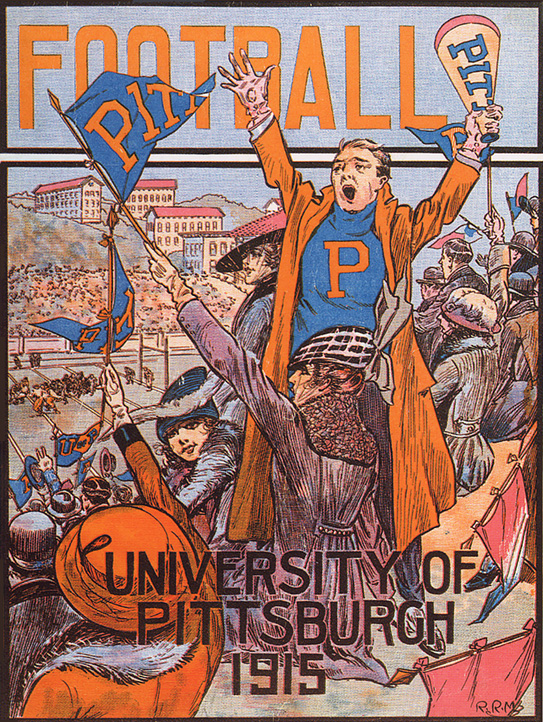
Cheering on the Pitt football team has traditionally been one of the most celebrated activities at the university, as depicted in this cover art from a 1915 game program.

The University of Pittsburgh's athletic teams, referred to as the "Pittsburgh Panthers" or "Pitt Panthers", include 19 university-sponsored varsity teams at the highest level of competitive collegiate athletics in the United States: the National Collegiate Athletic Association (NCAA) Division I (NCAA Division 1 Football Bowl Subdivision (FBS)).

Varsity men's sports sponsored by the university are baseball, basketball, cross country, football, soccer, swimming and diving, indoor track and field, outdoor track and field, and wrestling; while sponsored women's varsity sports include basketball, cross country, gymnastics, lacrosse, soccer, softball, swimming and diving, indoor track and field, outdoor track and field, and volleyball. All varsity sports teams compete as members of the Atlantic Coast Conference (ACC) since the 2013–14 season, with the exception of the gymnastics team which moved to the ACC when the conference began sponsoring the sport in 2023. Pitt athletes have received a total of five Olympic medals.

Scholastically, during 2024-25 academic year, out of approximately 450 Pitt varsity student athletes, 332 had grade point averages exceeding 3.0 placing them on the ACC Academic Honor Roll.

There are approximately 28 additional athletic teams that compete at the non-varsity club sports level.

Pitt's highest-profile athletic programs, football and men's basketball, are consistently competitive. Pitt has been regularly ranked as having one of the best combinations of football and basketball programs by multiple sports media outlets, including CBS Sports, ESPN, and Sports Illustrated.

In the fall of 1909, the University of Pittsburgh was the first college or university to adopt the panther (Puma concolor) as its mascot. Popular as photo sites, there are ten representations of Panthers in and about Pitt's campus, and ten more painted fiberglass panthers placed around the campus by the Pitt Student Government. These fiberglass panther structures are given to a campus group for a year and painted by the group to reflect their interests. The oldest representations are four panthers that guard each corner of the Panther Hollow bridge. Other Oakland locations include both inside and in front of the William Pitt Union, outside the Petersen Events Center, "Pitt the Panther" on the carousel in Schenley Plaza, the Panther head fountain on the front of the Cathedral of Learning, and the Pitt Panther statue outside Acrisure Stadium on Pittsburgh's North Side.

=== Football ===
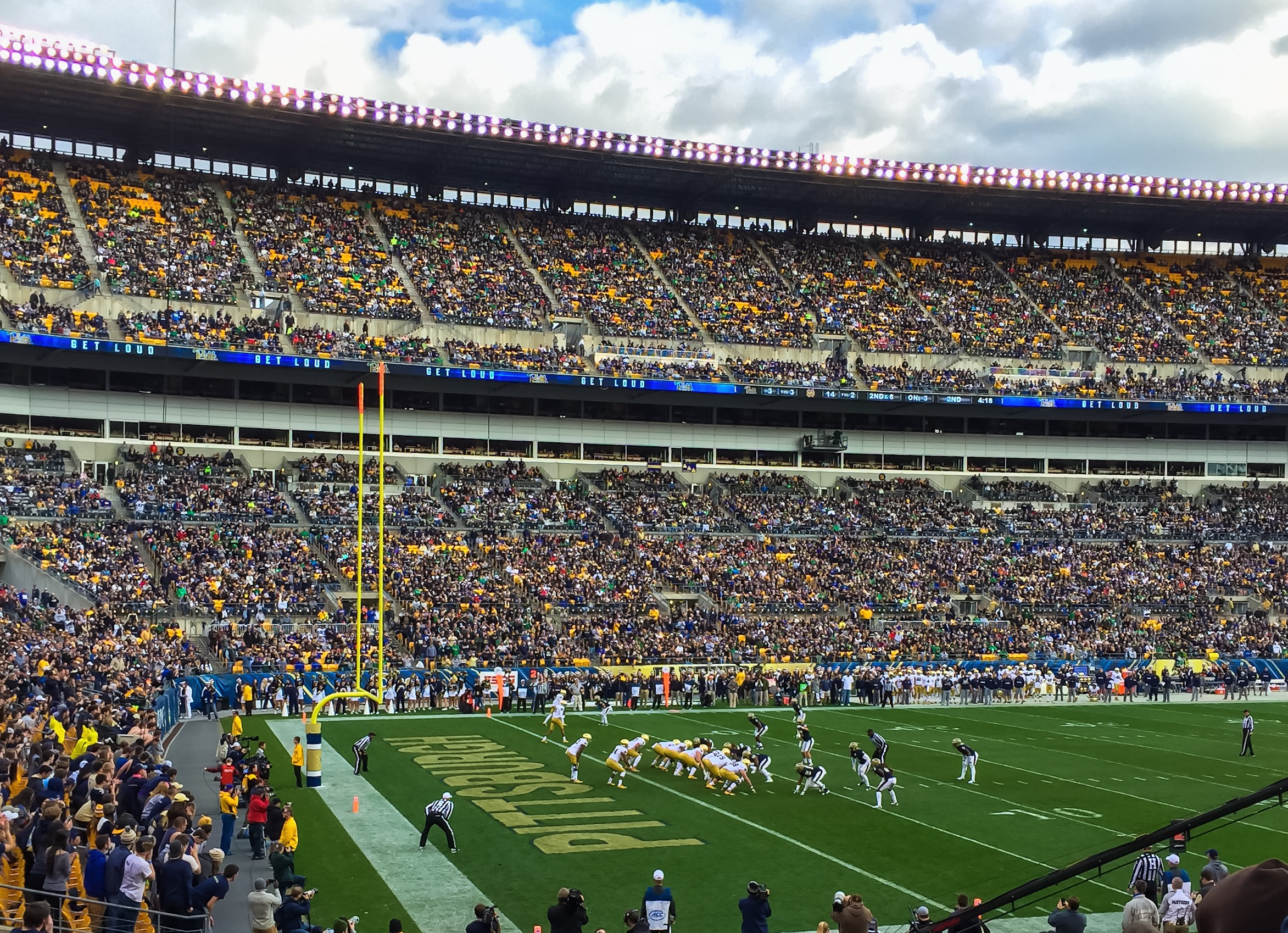
Pitt Football playing Notre Dame at Acrisure Stadium in 2015

Traditionally the most popular sport at the University of Pittsburgh, football has been played at the highest levels at the university since 1890. During the more than 100 years of competitive football at Pitt, the university has helped pioneer the sport by, among other things, instituting the use of numbers on jerseys and desegregating the Sugar Bowl with Bobby Grier. Some of college football's all-time greatest coaches and players have plied their trade at Pitt, including Pop Warner, Jock Sutherland, Marshall Goldberg, Joe Schmidt, Mike Ditka, Tony Dorsett, Hugh Green, Mark May, Dan Marino, Bill Fralic, Curtis Martin, Darrelle Revis, Russ Grimm, LeSean McCoy, Larry Fitzgerald and Aaron Donald. Among the top schools in terms of all-time wins, Pitt teams have claimed nine National Championships and boast 88 players that have been chosen as first-team All-Americans. Since 2015, the head coach of the football team has been Pat Narduzzi.

=== Basketball ===
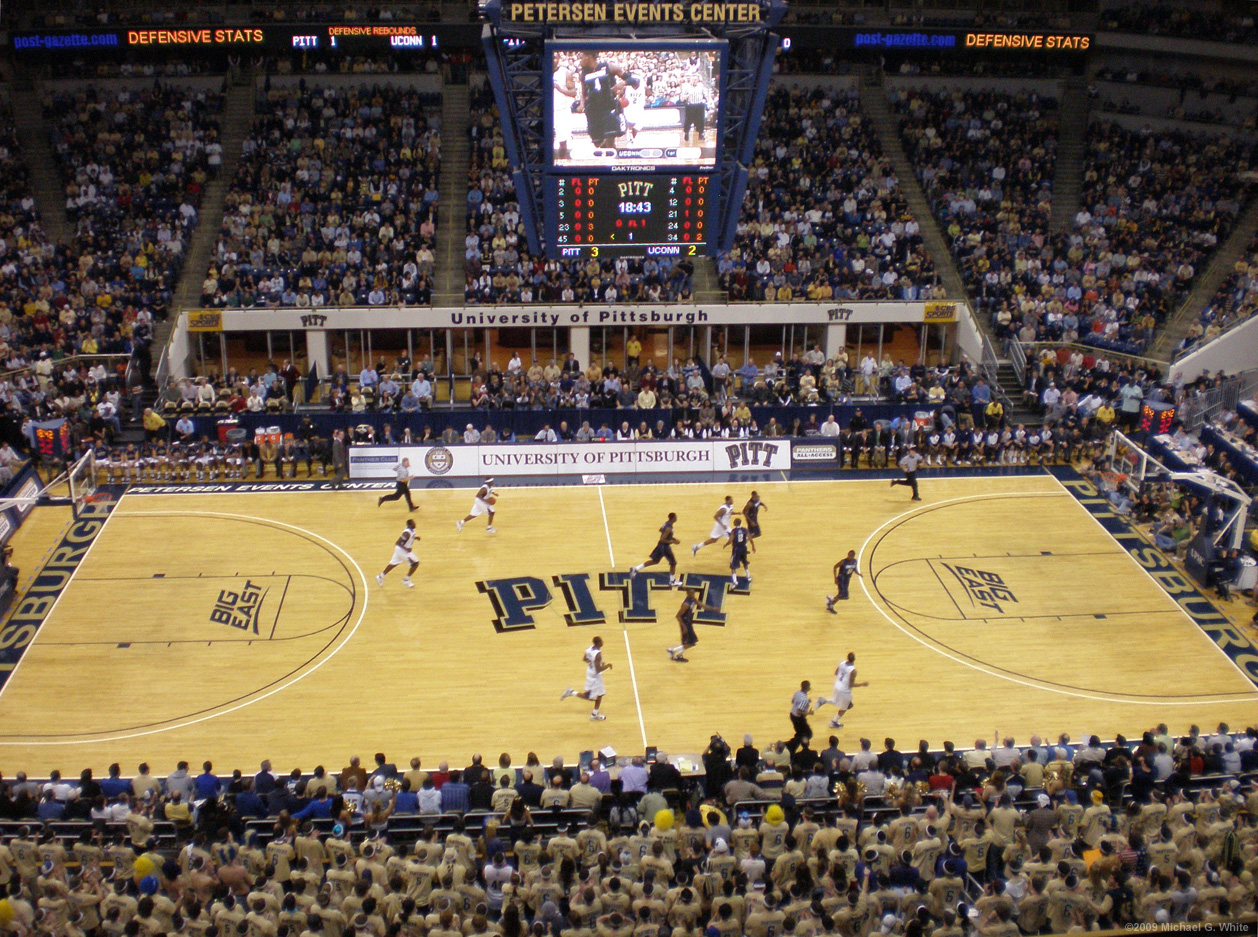
Pitt basketball in the Petersen Events Center

Pitt first sponsored varsity men's basketball in 1905 and became an early national power after winning two Helms Foundation National Championships in 1927–28 and 1929–30. Those teams, coached by the innovative and legendary Naismith Hall of Fame inductee "Doc" Carlson, were led by National Player of the Year and Hall of Famer Charlie Hyatt. Following a Final Four appearance in 1941, Pitt appeared in a handful of NCAA tournaments throughout the 1950s, 1960s, and 1970s, including an Elite Eight appearance in 1974 led by All-American Billy Knight. Pitt joined the Big East Conference in 1982, and by the end of the decade had secured a pair of Big East regular season championships led by All-Americans Charles Smith and Jerome Lane. In the 2000s (decade), led by coach Jamie Dixon, an era of consistent national and conference competitiveness has been achieved, including reaching the number one ranking in various national polls. Since 2002, Pitt has appeared in eleven NCAA tournaments advancing to five Sweet Sixteens and an Elite Eight. During this time, prior to joining the Atlantic Coast Conference in 2013, Pitt and has won three Big East regular season championships, two Big East Tournament Championships, and has advanced to six Big East Tournament Championship games. The head coach of the men's basketball team is Jeff Capel.

The Pittsburgh Panthers women's varsity basketball program started during the 1914–1915 school year and lasted until 1927 before going on hiatus until 1970. Pitt's women's team has posted several NCAA, NWIT, and EAIAW tournament appearances including four NCAA Tournaments and Sweet Sixteen appearances in 2008 and 2009.

=== Olympic sports ===
The "Pitt script" logo is the primary logo of the university's athletics department. Since 1939, Pitt has used stylized versions of the signature of the City of Pittsburgh's namesake, William Pitt, 1st Earl of Chatham, as logos in various capacities.

Pitt has a long history of success in other intercollegiate athletic events. In Track and Field, Pitt has produced several Olympic and NCAA champions such as 800 m Olympic gold medalist John Woodruff, two-time 110 m hurdle Olympic gold medalist Roger Kingdom, and seven-time NCAA champion and 2005 World Champion triple jumper Trecia-Kaye Smith. The wrestling program has a rich history and is among the leaders in producing individual national champions with 16. Pitt's women's volleyball team, one of the winningest program in the nation, won 11 conference championships while a member of the Big East, 7 ACC championships, and has appeared in five NCAA final fours since the program began in 1974. Pitt's swimming and diving teams have produced several Olympians and won 19 men's and nine women's Big East Championships while a member of that conference. Pitt women's gymnastics is a regular qualifier for the NCAA Northeast Regional Championship. Baseball, Pitt's oldest varsity sport, has produced several major league players and has reached the national 25 repeatedly, including in 2013. Other varsity sports have also competed at national and conference championships and include cross country, soccer, softball, and tennis.

=== Support groups ===
The University of Pittsburgh Varsity Marching Band was founded in 1911 and performs at athletic and other events. The Pitt Cheerleading squad has won multiple cheerleading national championships, including three straight from 1992 to 1994. The Pitt dance team also has been competitive in national competitions.

== People ==
=== Faculty ===
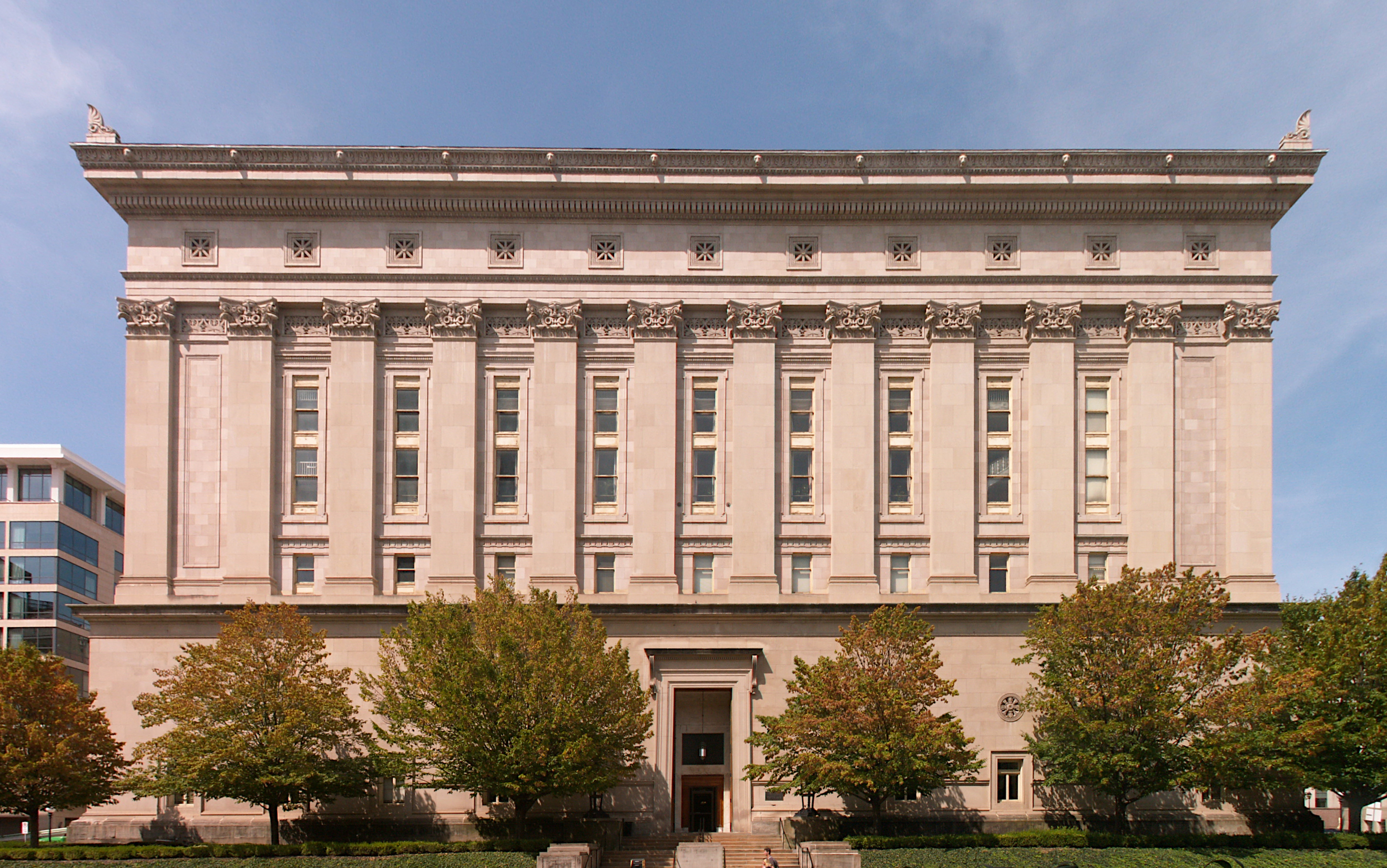
Alumni Hall, home to the Office of Admissions and Financial Aid, and Alumni Relations

University faculty have been pioneers in such fields as virology (Jonas Salk), astronomy (John Brashear), aviation (Samuel Pierpont Langley), and psychology (Benjamin Spock). The university has been home to faculty members deemed the "fathers" of various fields, such as the "father of radio broadcasting" (Reginald Fessenden), the "father of project management" (David I. Cleland), the "father of CPR" (Peter Safar), and the "father of organ transplantation" (Thomas Starzl).

The university is also notable for its faculty in philosophy. The university is the namesake of the Pittsburgh school, which was founded by Wilfrid Sellars, a significant figure in analytic philosophy. Current notable faculty in the philosophy department include John McDowell, Robert Brandom, and Nicholas Rescher.

There have been 31 university heads for the University of Pittsburgh. Beginning in the institution's academy days, the head of the school was referred to as Principal, a title that was retained until 1872 when it was changed to Chancellor by an alteration to the university's charter. This title of Chancellor has lasted except for a brief change during Wesley Posvar's administration when it was switched to president.

=== Alumni ===
As of 2019, the University of Pittsburgh has over 330,000 living alumni who are supported by the Pitt Alumni Association, founded in 1866, and over 50 regionally-based Pitt Clubs located throughout the world.

Three Pitt alumni have been awarded the Nobel Prize: Paul Lauterbur '62 for his work in magnetic resonance imaging, Philip Hench '20 for discovery of the hormone cortisone, and Wangari Maathai '66 for founding the Green Belt Movement. Other alumni have also been pioneers in their respective fields, including John Wistar Simpson '41, a pioneer in nuclear energy, and Vladimir Zworykin '26, who has been regarded as the "father of television". National Medal of Science winners include Bert W. O'Malley '59 & '63, a pioneer in steroid hormones, and Herbert Boyer '63, Genentech founder and biotech pioneer; while Leonard Baker '52, Michael Chabon '84, and Brandon Som '02 have won the Pulitzer Prize.

Pitt alumni who have excelled in professional sports include Pro Football Hall of Fame inductees Dan Marino '83, Mike Ditka '61, and Tony Dorsett '77. Basketball Hall of Fame inductees include pioneering coach Clifford Carlson '18 & '20 while others, such as John Woodruff '39 and Roger Kingdom '02, have won Olympic gold.

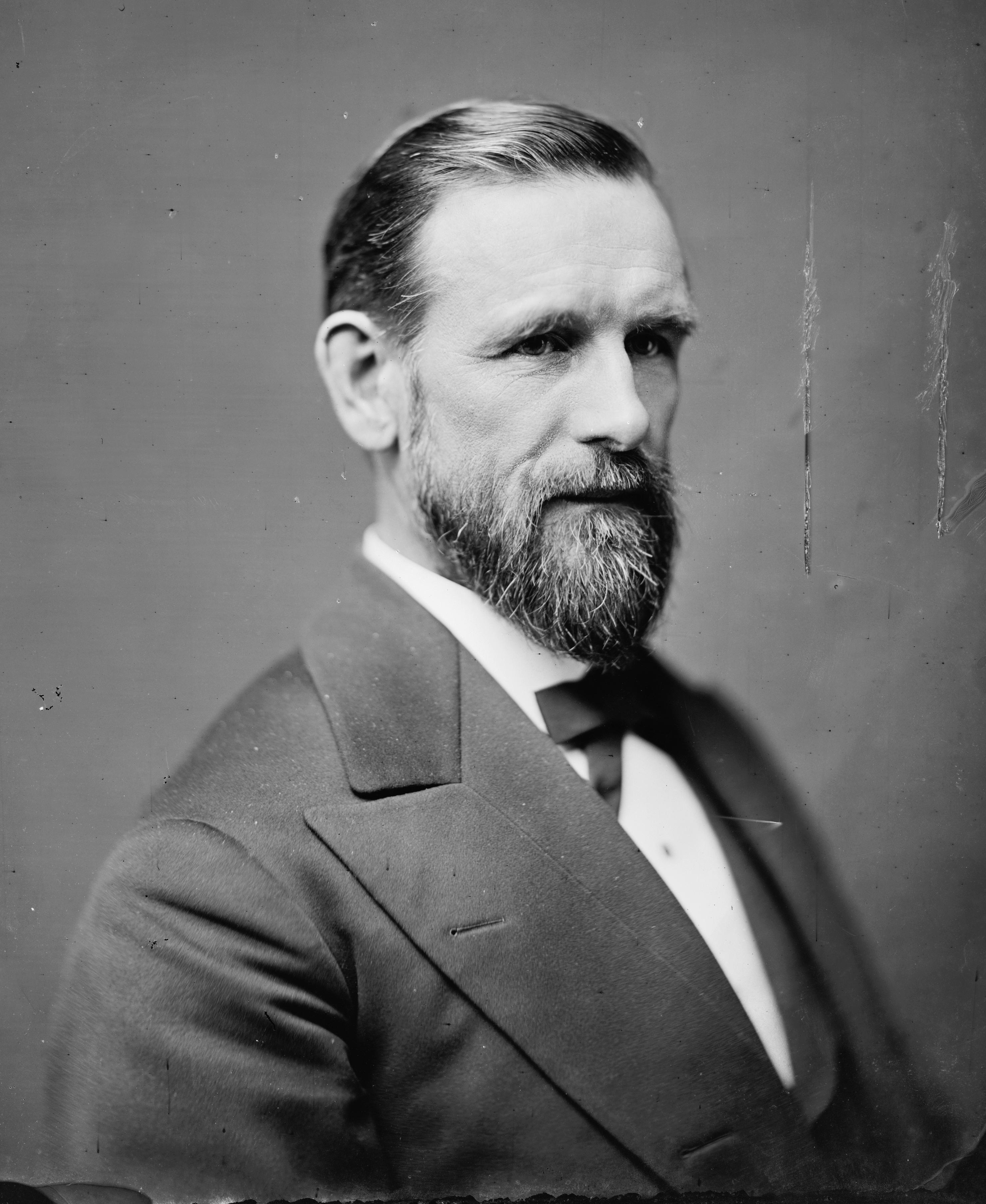
Samuel J. R. McMillan (1846), U.S. senator from Minnesota

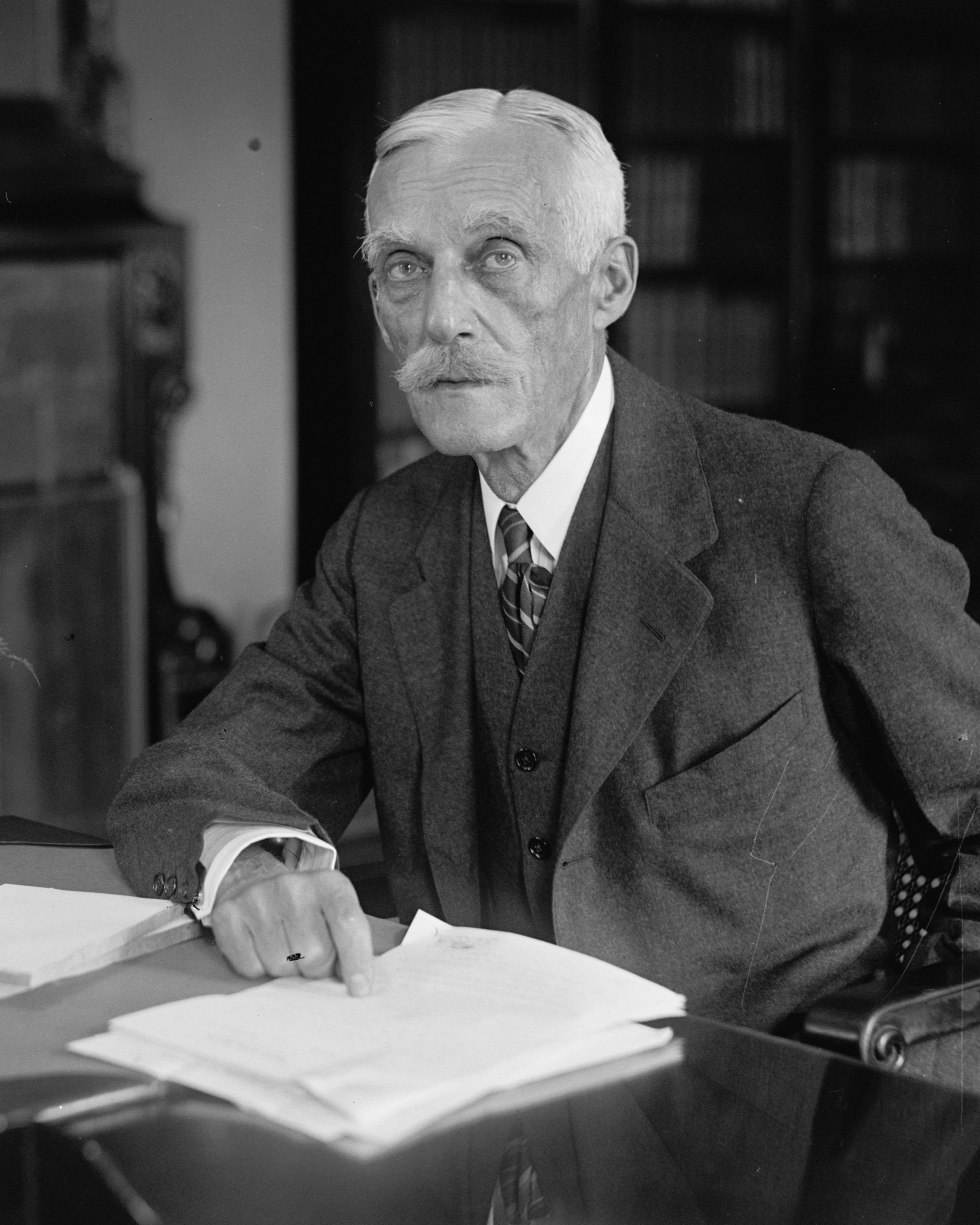
Andrew Mellon 49th U.S. Secretary of the Treasury

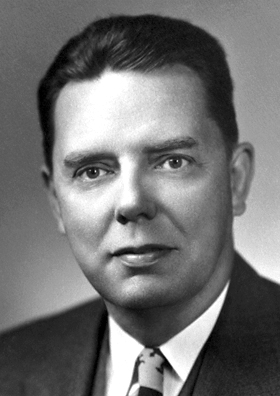
Philip Hench (M.D. 1920), recipient of the 1950 Nobel Prize in Medicine

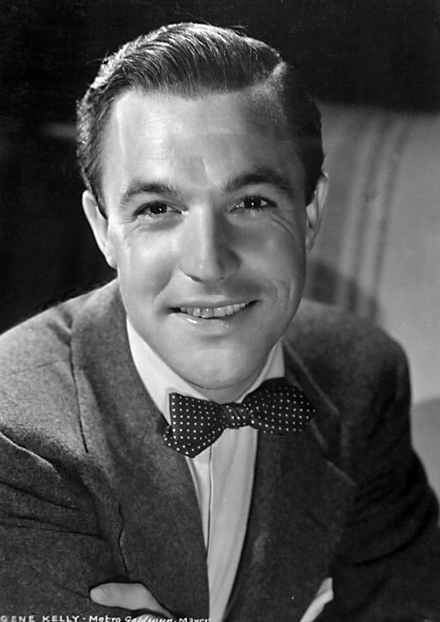
Academy Award-winning dancer and actor, Gene Kelly (1933)

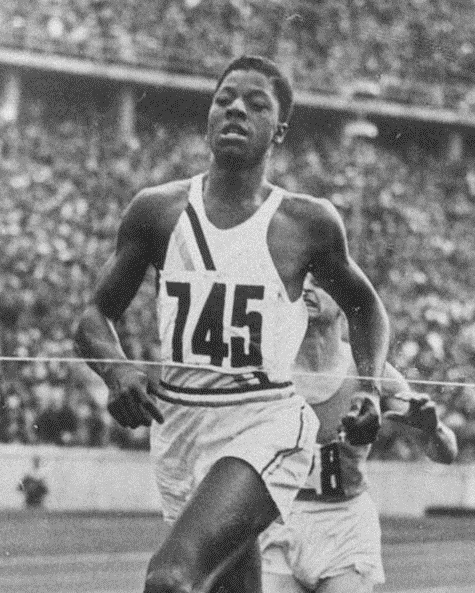
Olympic Gold-winning runner, John Woodruff (1939)

Paul Lauterbur (Ph.D. 1962), recipient of the 2003 Nobel Prize in Medicine

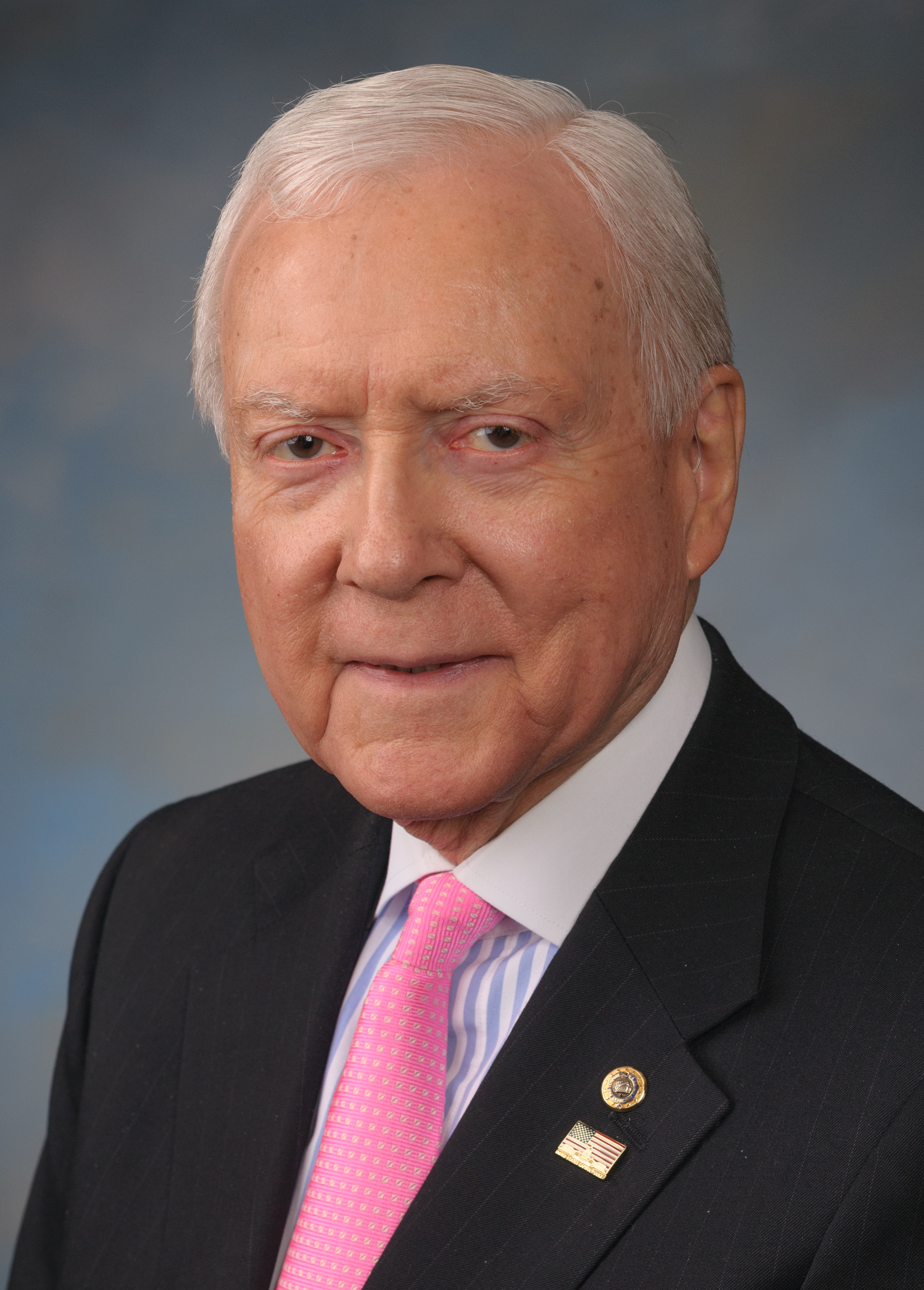
Orrin Hatch (J.D. 1962), U.S. senator from Utah

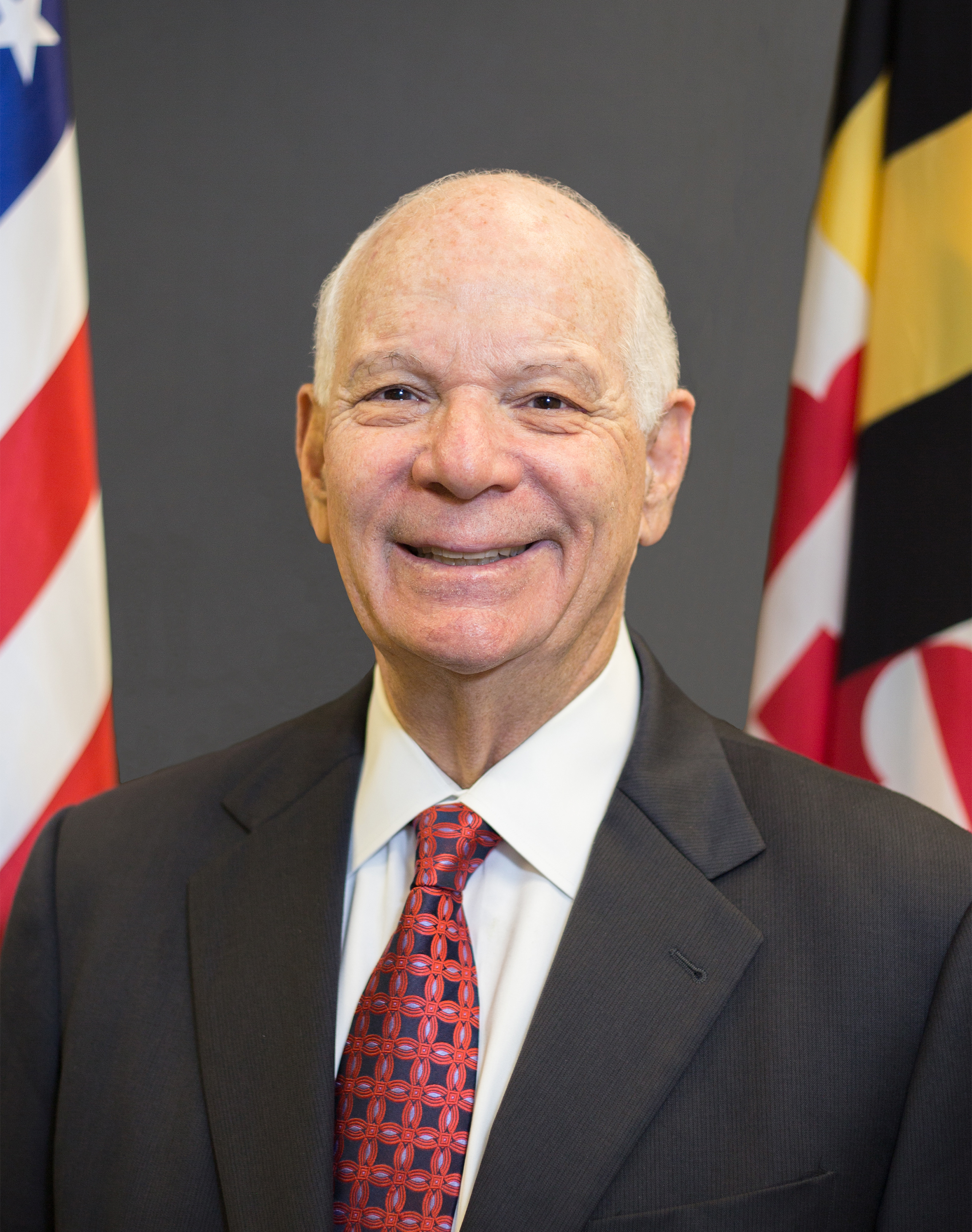
Ben Cardin (B.A. 1964), U.S. senator from Maryland

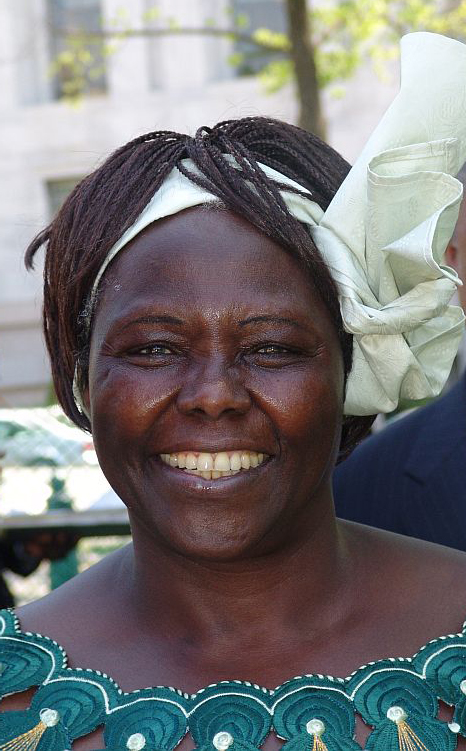
Wangari Maathai (M.Sc. 1965), recipient of the Nobel Peace Prize

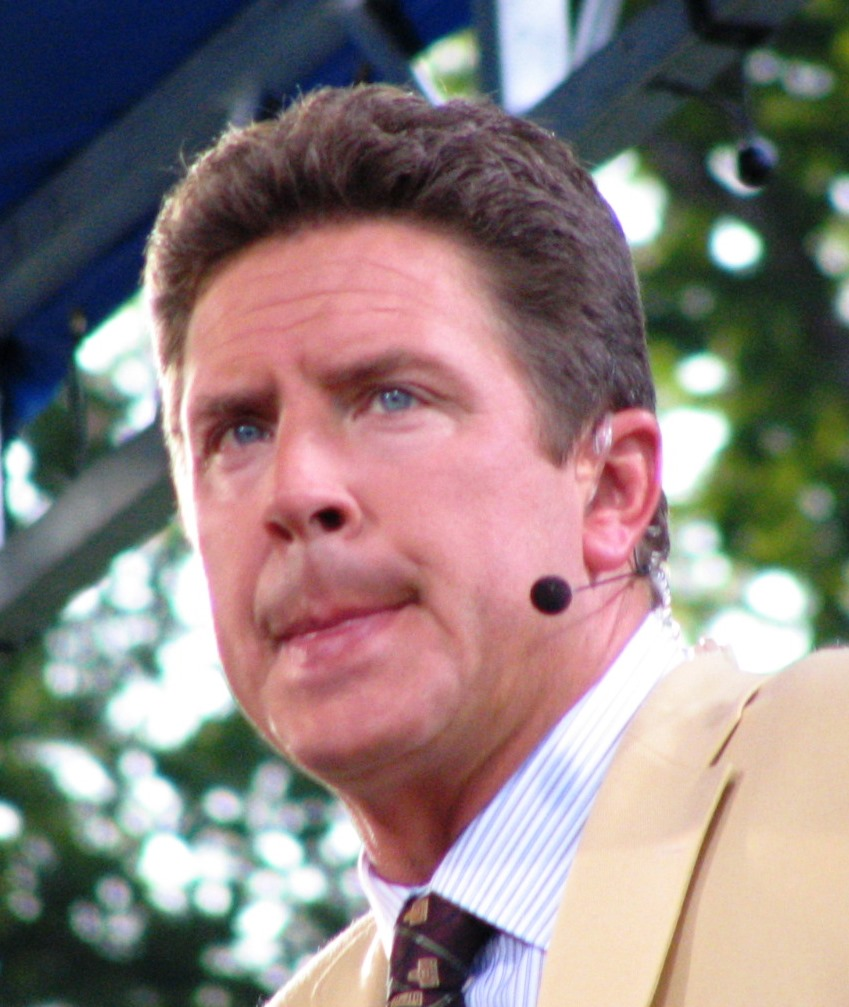
Dan Marino (1983), Pro Football Hall of Fame football player

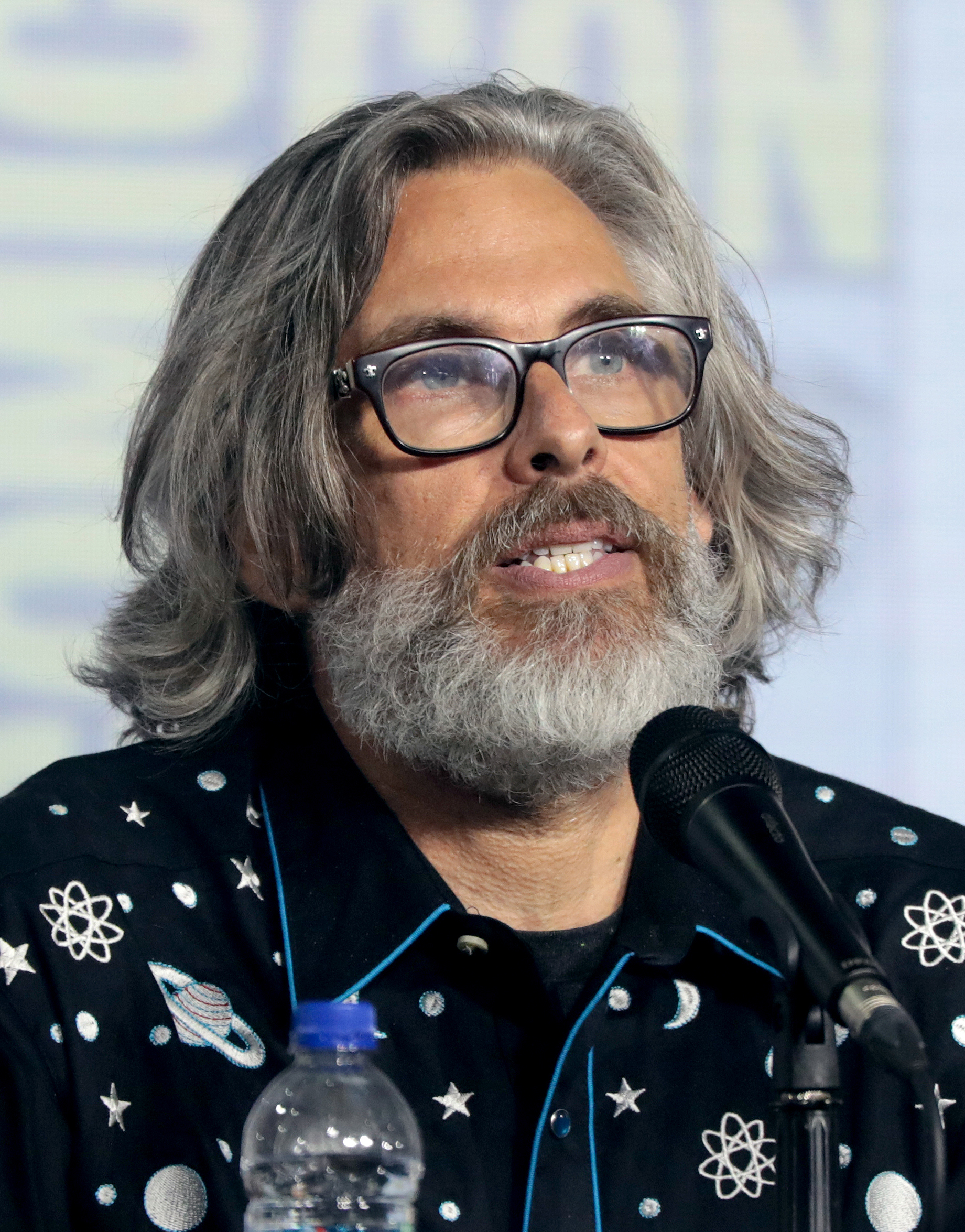
Michael Chabon (B.A. 1984), Pulitzer Prize–winning author

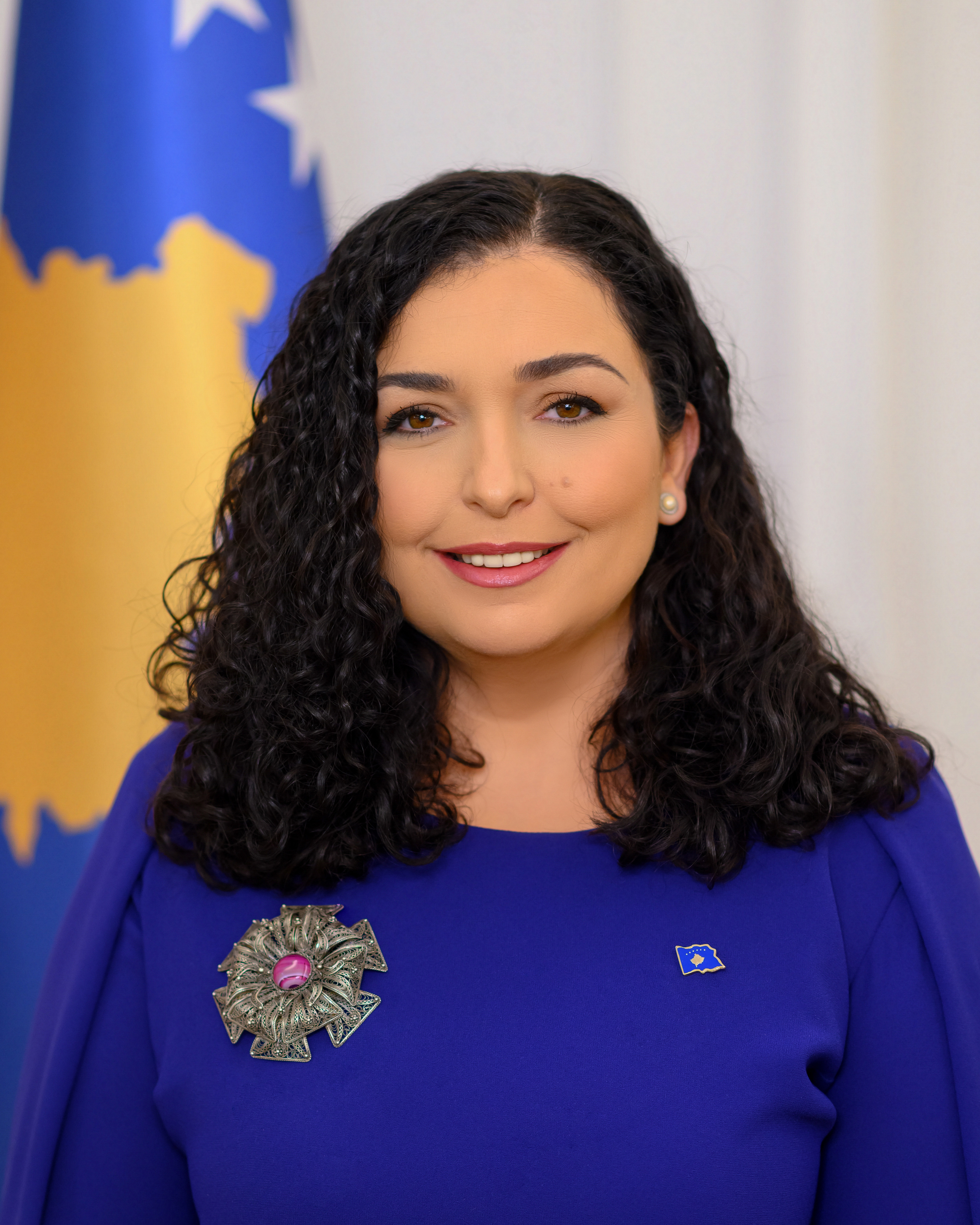
Vjosa Osmani (M.L. 2004, S.J.D. 2015), fifth President of Kosovo
