= Flagstaff Hill, Pennsylvania =

Hill in Schenley Park, Pittsburgh

Coordinates: 40.44047°N 79.94566°W

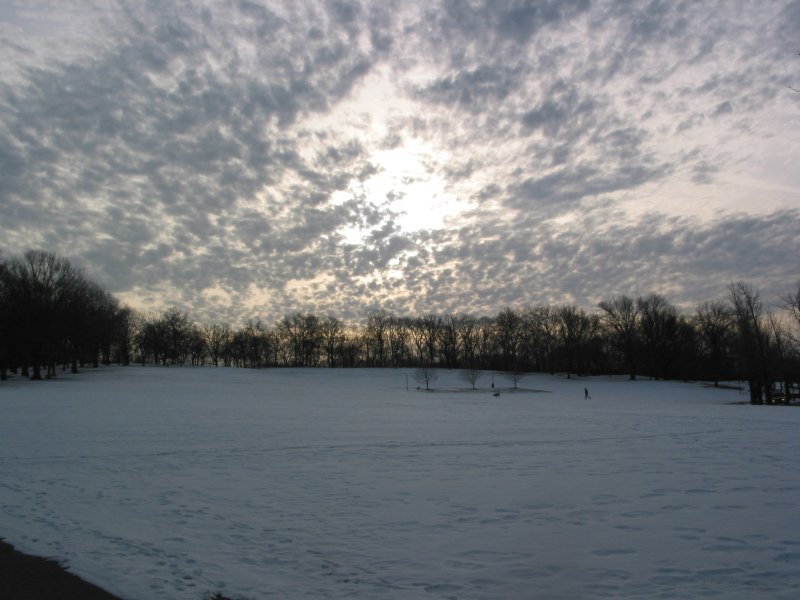
View from the bottom of Flagstaff Hill in winter

Flagstaff Hill is a large, gently sloping hill in Schenley Park in Pittsburgh, Pennsylvania, located near Oakland.

It is a popular space to frolic for students from nearby Carnegie Mellon University and the University of Pittsburgh. The City of Pittsburgh offers free summertime outdoor movies there, part of its Dollar Bank Cinema in the Parks program, as well as free summer concerts. Flagstaff Hill lies adjacent to Phipps Conservatory & Botanical Gardens. Pickup Ultimate Frisbee is traditionally played there on Sundays and Wednesdays, almost entirely regardless of weather. On warm days, many residents of Oakland often have picnics or take their lunch breaks on the Hill. Festivals are sometimes held there, and tents are set up for various events, such as the Pittsburgh Race for the Cure. In the winter when there is snow on the hillside, Flagstaff Hill is popular with sled-riders of all ages.

In 1889, Mary Schenley donated 300 acres (1.2 km^{2}) of a site called "Mt. Airy Tract" to the city of Pittsburgh, part of which included modern Flagstaff Hill. Edward Bigelow, Pittsburgh's first Director of Public Works, created a series of boulevards and attractions in the new park, renamed Schenley Park. At one time there was a 120-foot (37 m) electric circular fountain on Flagstaff Hill that featured nighttime light shows. Now the hillside is mostly covered in grass, with a gazebo at the foot of the hill, benches surrounding, and trees and a walking pathway on all sides.

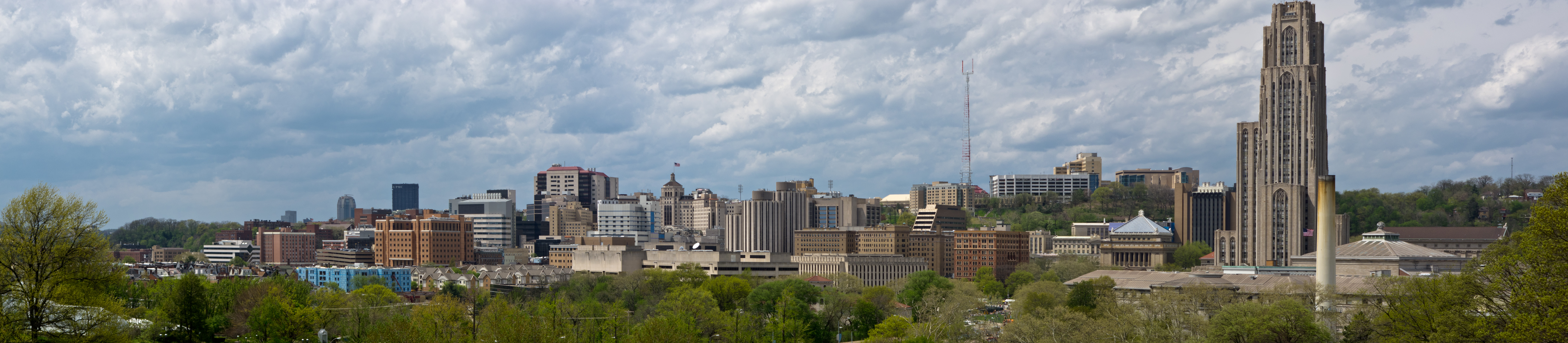
A panoramic view from Flagstaff Hill looking towards Oakland and the University of Pittsburgh
