= Oakland Square Historic District =

Neighborhood of Pittsburgh, Pennsylvania, USA

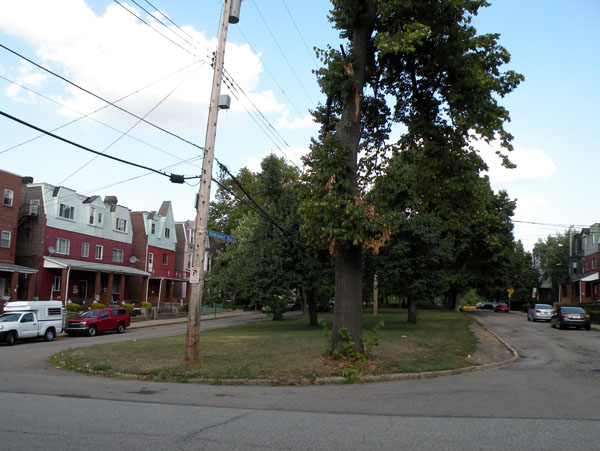
- Oakland Square

- Location within Pittsburgh
- 40.437231°N 79.952219°W
- Location: Oakland Square in the South Oakland neighborhood of Pittsburgh, Pennsylvania, USA

History
- Built: 1890s

Oakland Square Historic District in the Central Oakland neighborhood of Pittsburgh, Pennsylvania, contains 99 properties. The core of the district surrounds Oakland Square, with the remaining properties along Parkview Avenue and Dawson Street. The neighborhood was conceived in the 1890s by developer Eugene O'Neill and were inspired by the urban design of Victorian England and Dublin. The district was added to the List of City of Pittsburgh historic designations on June 14, 2005.

During 1889 and 1890 twenty-six homes were built on Oakland Square, in the section known as Linden Grove. This was “the first big batch (of houses) to be put up in that district.” The houses were moderately priced ($6,500) and sold within a few months. These were attractive and comfortable urban homes with eight rooms and many conveniences. There were located close to the Fifth Avenue cable car connecting Oakland to downtown.

In subsequent years more houses were built in phases, known as North Oakland Square and South Oakland Square. The whole development used about six acres (2.4 ha) of land and had one primary developer, Eugene M. O’Neill, and one builder, Charles H. Chance.

Oakland Square

- 1889 – 26 units, still Oakland Square

North Oakland Square

- 1891 – 13 units, now 3700 block Parkview
- 1893 – 4 units, now 3700 block Dawson

South Oakland Square

- 1891 – 7 units, now 3600 block, Dawson
- 1896 – 17 units, now 3600 block, Parkview

for a total of 67 housing units, all still standing although considerably modified.

The design of Oakland Square is reminiscent of early Victorian squares in London and Dublin. The park is considered an outstanding urban open space. Each of the plans had slightly different designs, although all are three-story (or two-story plus mansard,) most have full bays and front porches (Oakland Square has both front and rear porches) and were modern for the time (water closets, electric bells, and other amenities.)

Several factors probably brought about this successful development one hundred years ago: the opening of the cable car line 12 September 1888; the burgeoning population of both Oakland and Pittsburgh; the economic climate, with its mood of expansionism and development; and the drive and creativity of the developer, Eugene M. O’Neill.

Today Oakland Square continues to be appreciated and to attract praise. The well-designed and attractive homes are still comfortable for a dense urban style of life. The open space, especially the park, relieves the monotony of walls of houses. In earlier times the City of Pittsburgh maintained beautiful gardens in the park. In 100 years there has been no major destruction, so the Square is still an intact unit, and every original house in the original development still stands, although many have been altered, some significantly. The location continues to be desirable, although today the occupants are more likely to affiliated with the Oakland institutions than with downtown businesses.

== The area: Linden Grove ==
Probably as early as 1834, after James Craft has purchased most of the land of Senator James Ross in Oakland, the area became known as Linden Grove. Bounded by the lands of Chadwick on the north, O’Hara or Schenley on the east, the bluffs on the south, and present day Bates Street on the west, the area may have been named Linden Grove by Craft. At least, he prepared a plan, never recorded. An 1859 plot plan calls much of Middle and Lower Oakland “Linden Grove” and so it continued until into the 20th century. An 1876 Atlas shows “Linden Station” on the Pittsburgh and Connellsville Railroad, about at Bates and Second Avenue. There may have been a recreational area here before the Civil War, and then during the Civil War, a training camp, known first as Linden Grove and later Camp Howe.

James Craft was selling lots in Linden Grove during much of the 19th Century: 320 land sales are recorded between 1822 and 1876. After 1846 Charley Taylor was distributing lots on what had been James Chadwick’s farm – the so-called Third Century Church Colony. Other lots were found on which to build large homes. The O’Hara or Schenley properties (Mr. Airy) were largely undivided during the period. Leslie’s plan of Linden Grove was recorded in 1859 and several large lots were sold for homes.

Still Oakland, part of Pitt Township until 1866, developed rather slowly, compared to the Southside, both before and after the Civil War. Two types of development were taking place: the building of prominent mansions, many along Pennsylvania Avenue (now Fifth Avenue), some of which were summer homes. And, the building of homes for workers crowding the valleys and river terraces. There were, according to maps, many homes between Bouquet Street and Atwood; a fair-sized community near the Dithridge Estate where Mellon Institute stands now. This latter area was called East Pittsburgh in an 1852 map. Other homes were scattered through Middle and Lower Oakland, with development along Ward Street as far as Frazier.

By 1872 the Linden Land Company had been formed and apparently purchased many acres of land in Linden Grove, land which had not previously been sold by Craft or by Leslie.

In 1872 the Linden Land Company advertised:

Choice lots for Suburban Residences: City Water and Gas. No Small Lots. Low Prices and Easy Payments. The Linden Land Company offers for sale a few choice lots varying in size from one-half acres upwards, situated in Linden Grove, Oakland – the most beautiful and accessible suburb of this city. This property is eligibly located; can be reached by steam cars, street railways and by easy drive in 20 minutes on Fifth Avenue, soon to be paved with wooden pavement and destined, ere long, to be the most favorable and frequented drive in the city.”

Principals in the Linden Land Company included Hill Burgwin, attorney; Charles L. Speer, John Scully and Simon Beymer, all of whom also owned land in the area as individuals.

Some of the Craft land became the site of Oakland Square. Eugene O’Neill, who clearly was the mover behind the innovative Oakland Square plans, purchased 5.5 acres (2.2 ha) from Simon Beymer, who at one time was the president of the Linden Land Company, and contributed 2 acres (0.81 ha) to the initial phase. Harriet L. Rook, O’Neill’s partner in Oakland Square, had bought almost two acres from Sarah Morgan, who earlier had purchased the land from the Linden Land Company. These 4 acres (1.6 ha) constituted the site for the first twenty-six homes on Oakland Square.

Another portion of his 5.5 acres of land was used by O’Neill to build the North Oakland development in 1891 and 1893, a total of 17 houses. Then O’Neill, together with C.A. Rook, son of Harriet Rook, and with H.G. Imhoff; and using two acres of land that previously had belonged to C.C. Mellor, and which was Lot #45 in the Linden Grove plan, created South Oakland Square, a total of 45 more houses.

In March and early April, 1889, the following advertisement appeared in the Pittsburgh Chronicle Telegraph:

For Sale $6,500 Oakland New

Two story and mansard, brick dwelling 8 rooms, hall, bath, laundry, inside shutters and w.c., bay window, large front and rear porches, slate mantels, fine tile hearths, electric bells, etc. The entire house elegantly papered and decorated, very fashionable locality, shade trees, etc. 5 minutes walk from Fifth Avenue Cable line, easy terms. Samuel W. Black & Co. 99 Fourth Avenue

On April 5, the price was shown as reduced to $5,850, “IF SOLD AT ONCE – ONE of the best locations in Oakland.” The name Oakland Square was not mentioned in the ads, but the description is exact and there were no other development at the time which would match the description.

Charles H. Chance was the builder of all 67 units of housing, a young man of thirty-two years when he began Oakland Square. Edeburg and Cooper, Civil Engineers, provided plot plans. The designer of the houses is presently unknown as no architect was listed on the building permit. Possible Chance was his own architect. Chance later became president of the Oakland Board of Trade and after 1904, left building for real estate, with his office in Oakland.

O’Neill likely played a major role in the layout and design because he would have been familiar with Dublin, Ireland, houses and squares, and there are many similarities. O’Neill was only 35 years old when he purchased the 5.5 acres of land from Beymer.

The houses were all completed and sold by May 1, 1891, or in about two years. The actual sale prices, as recorded in the County Deed Books, are generally higher than the advertised price of $6,500, suggesting that most of the purchasers had additional construction done, such as adding one more room, finishing the basement, or specifying more expensive fittings.

O’Neill’s success in this development may be implied by at least three facts:

- He sold off all of the homes in a relatively short time
- He attracted at least eight families sited on the Social Register
- He continued to develop not only the total of 67 units in his Oakland Square plan, but perhaps as many as 200 more in the area by 1904

== The developer: Eugene M. O’Neill ==
Eugene Murrough O’Neill, developer of Oakland Square, much of Parkview Avenue, and other areas of Oakland and Squirrel Hill, had a remarkable life. Born in 1850 and educated in Ireland, he came to Pittsburgh in his early twenties where his brother Daniel was established as an editor and part-owner of the Pittsburgh Dispatch, the first successful penny newspaper west of the Alleghenies. Eugene first read law and was admitted to the Bar on 11 March 1876. His future looked bright in law but on his brother’s death, 30 January 1877, Eugene took over management of the Dispatch. He built up the paper and continued for twenty-five years until retiring from full-time supervision in 1902 at the youthful age of fifty-two. Eugene also married his brother’s widow, Emma; adopted his family; lived in the family mansion, “Linden Hall” on Penn Avenue near Fifth Avenue; and developed some land Daniel had owned in Oakland. After his “retirement” in 1902, he continued as Vice-President and Director of the Dispatch and also maintained his real-estate interests.

From 1994, when as executor of his brother’s estate he developed houses in Oakland, O’Neill invested heavily in real estate. His builder, Charles H. Chance, stated in 1904 that he had built 250 houses in Oakland, most of them for O’Neill. O’Neill formed partnerships with colleagues from the Dispatch. Harriet Rook, with whom he created Oakland Square, was the widow of Daniel’s partner on the Dispatch, and also the mother of C.A. Rook with whom O’Neill planned South Oakland Square.

Later in his life, O’Neill traveled and had homes in Palm Beach, Florida; New York City; the Hotel Schenley in Oakland; and possibly in West Virginia. He controlled much real estate in Pittsburgh until the 1920s, selling of eight houses on North Oakland Square and five houses on South Oakland Square between 1919 and 1922. Some of his holdings were not liquidated until the 1940s (e.g. 3728-32 Dawson Street) and his estate was not completely settled until the mid-1950s.

Eugene O’Neill died in New York City November 6, 1926, a widower and a very wealthy man. At that time his principal heir was one daughter. Eugene O’Neill was buried in Allegheny Cemetery, Pittsburgh, after services in the Point Breeze Presbyterian Church. Almost fifty year earlier, his brother, Daniel, has his funeral services in St. Paul’s Cathedral and burial in St. Mary’s Cemetery.

It may be noteworthy that Daniel and Eugene O’Neill seemed to be accepted in Pittsburgh, amassed a fortune, and lived in an elegant mansion at the same time that the Irish immigrants of Boston and New York were badly mistreated, the Molly Maguires in Eastern Pennsylvania were brutally suppressed, and anti-Catholicism was raging through much of the country.

== Oakland Square residents ==
Who lived in Oakland Square? Over the one-hundred years, there have been many turnovers in the families living in the twenty-six houses. One generalization can be made: most of the residents have been at least middle-income and many have been businessmen and professionals.

The first residents (shown on the map) were probably representative of Pittsburgh of that day. The names are largely English, German, and Irish. Only one purchaser, Demmler, has a name that continues to appear in Oakland’s history, although the builder, Chance, did own #16 for a short period.

By 1900 eight of the families on Oakland Square were listed on the Social Register or Blue Book. Their names were similar to the early purchasers, and one, Mary J. Steel, was an original purchaser.

By 1923 the composition of the residents had changed markedly. Herman Demmler and Margaret White, original purchasers, still lived on the square. John B. Moore, editor of the Pittsburgh Press, lived at #17. A fair number of Jewish families had moved onto the block, with names like: Rosen, Blum, Levin, and Zakowitz. By 1929, there were thirteen families with Jewish names, ten with English or Irish. In the 1940s, the first Italian families moved onto Oakland Square. many of whom can still be found today.

== Today ==
Today many older Italian immigrants still inhabit the historic district. In more recent years, Asian, Hispanic, and Middle Eastern immigrants, young professionals, families, and graduate and undergraduate students attending the nearby universities have also taken up residence. The neighborhood distinguishes itself from much of Central Oakland for its relatively strong base of home ownership, reinvestment, and its orientation to families, retirees, and young professionals.
