= Oakland (Pittsburgh) =

Coordinates: 40.441°N 79.957°W

- Neighborhood of Pittsburgh; Former township
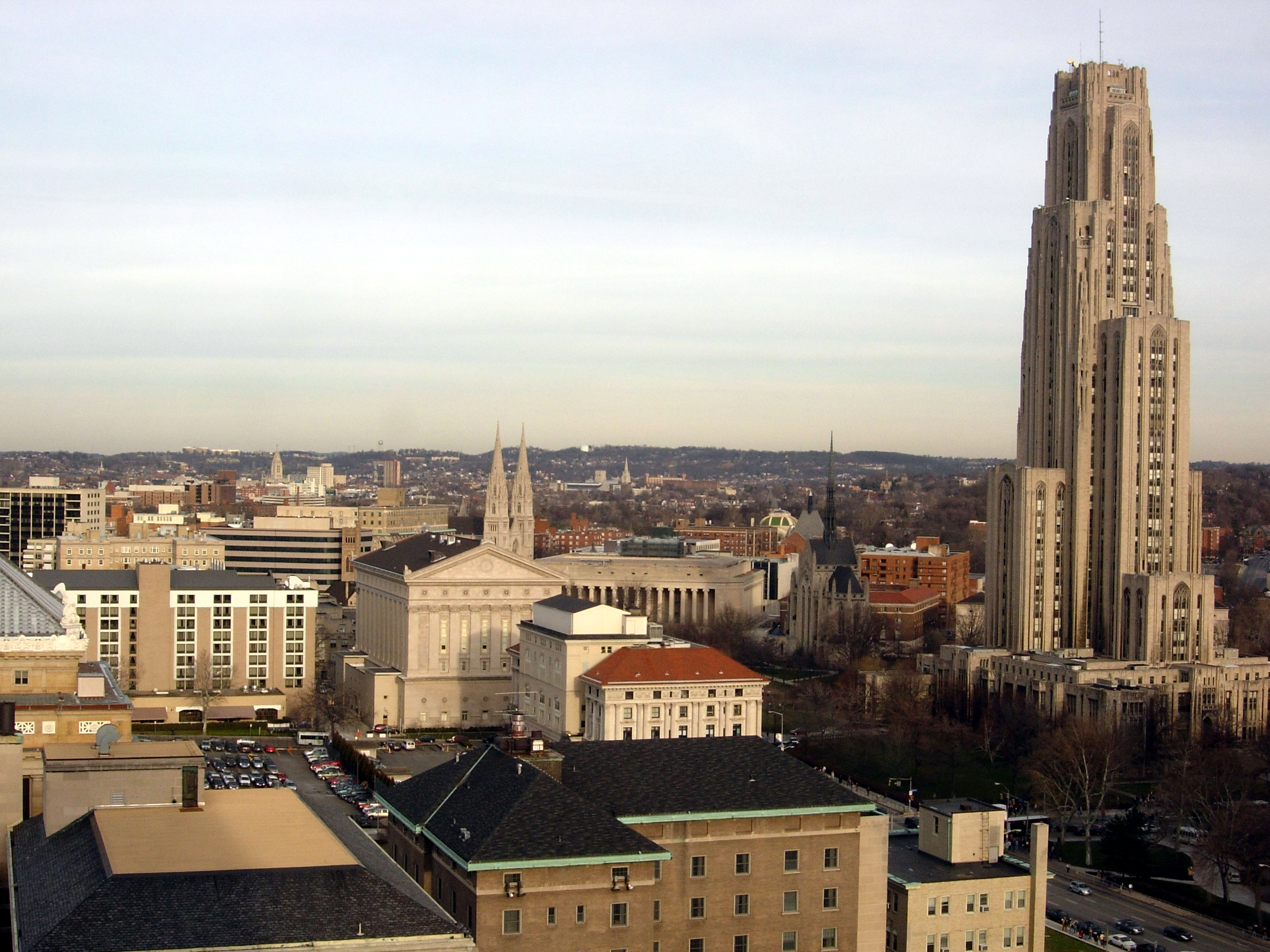
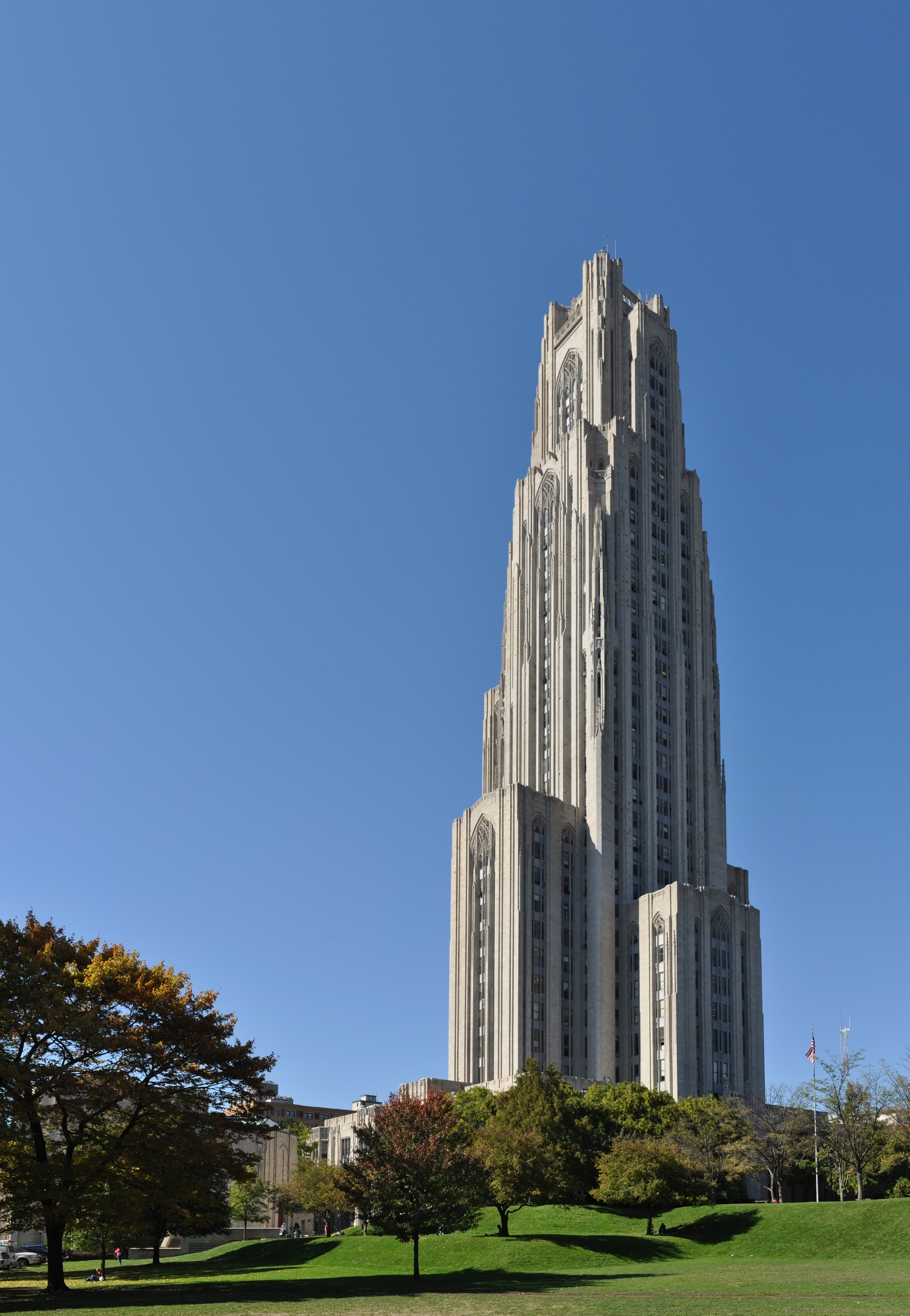
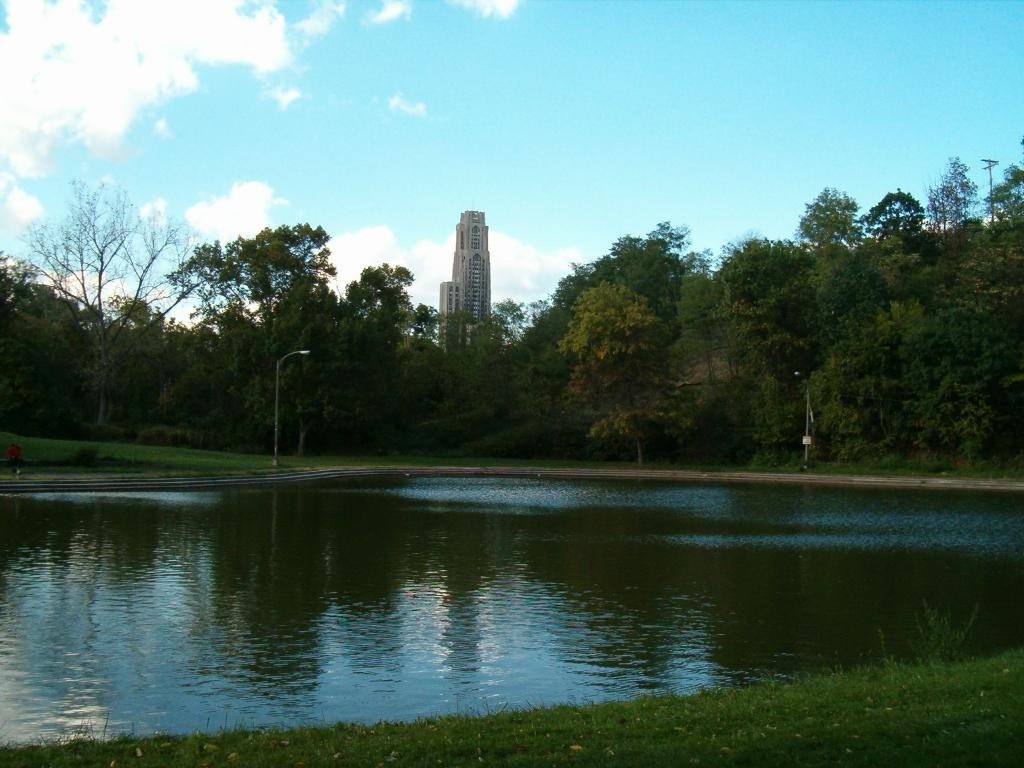
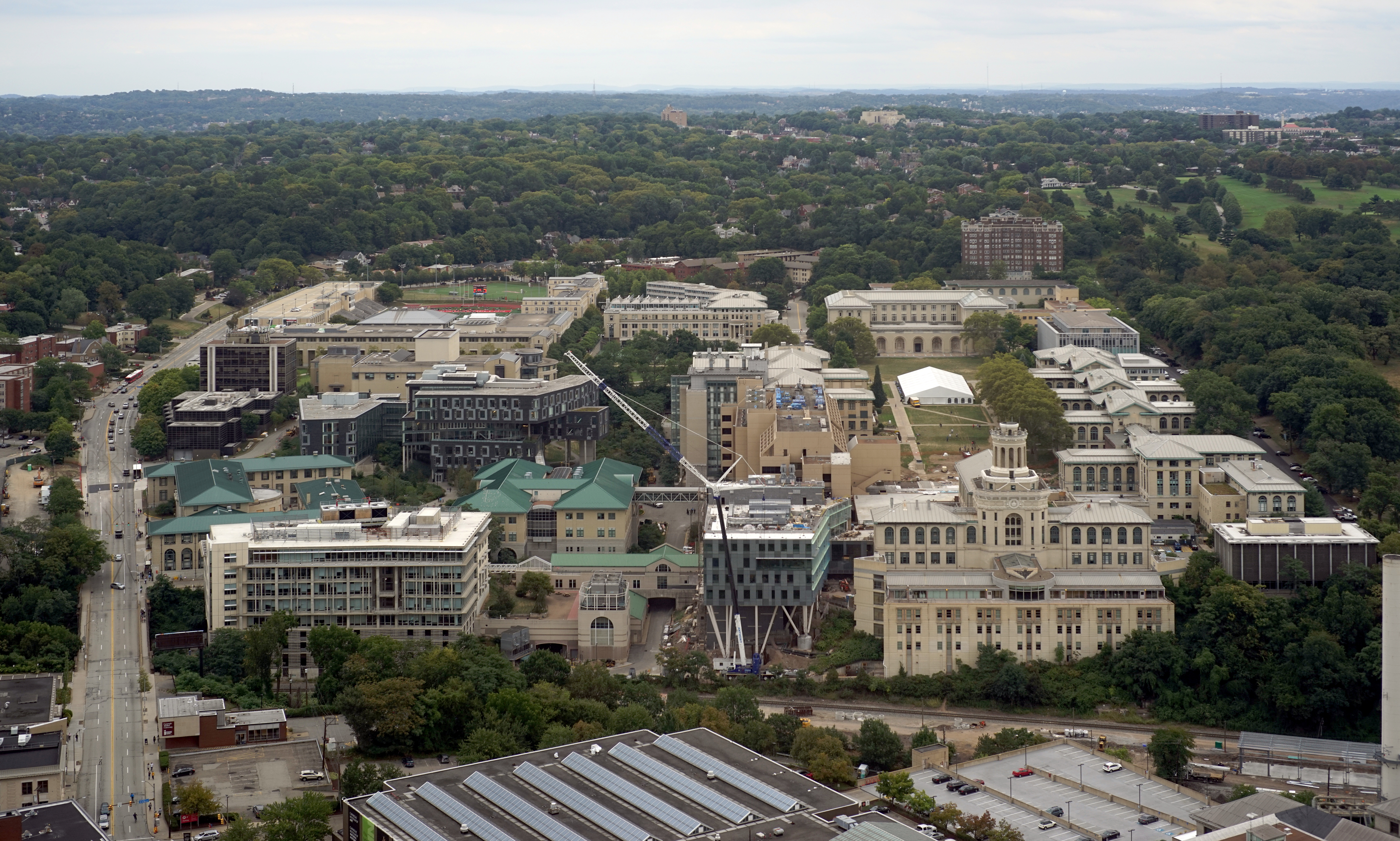
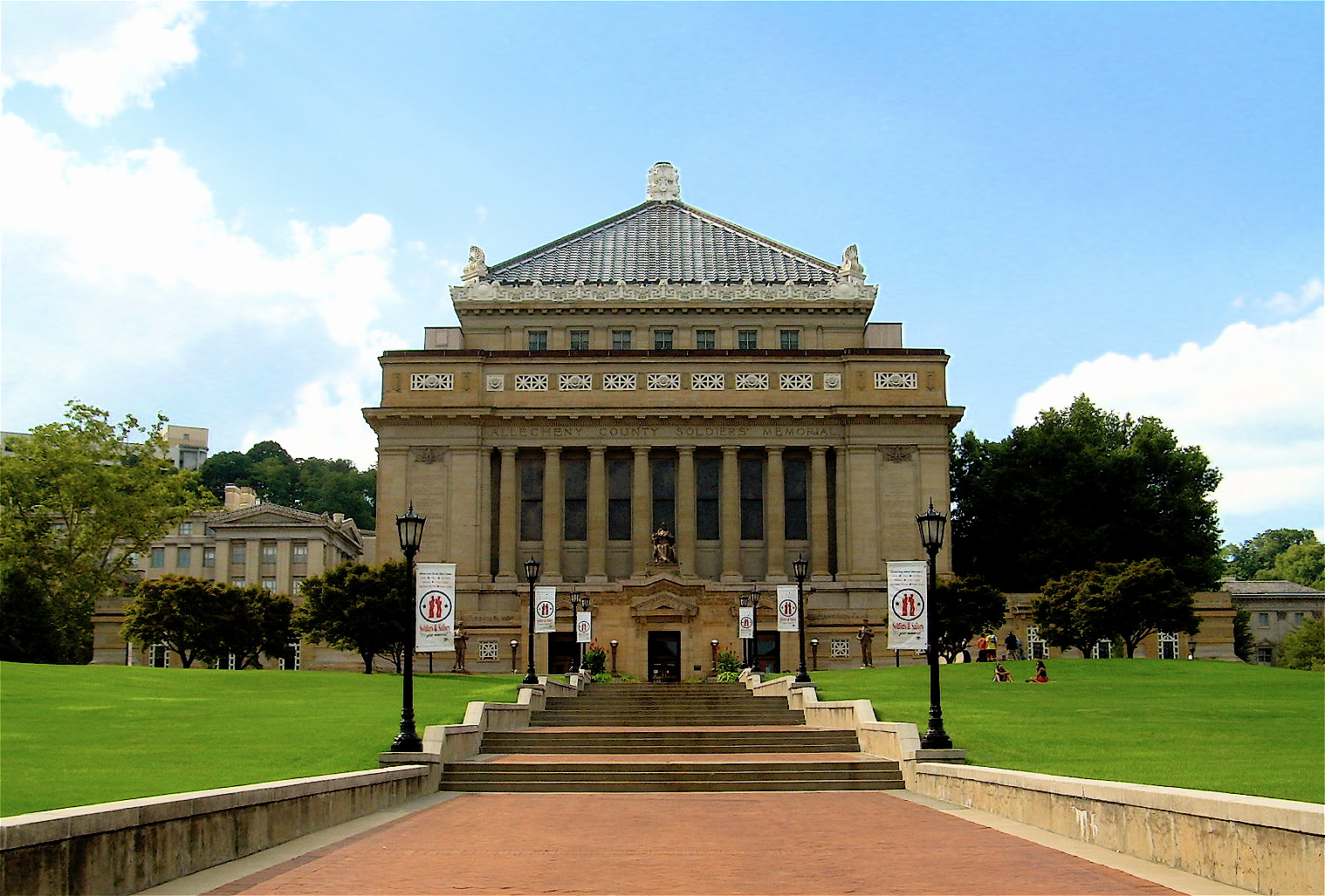
- Oakland's skyline. University of Pittsburgh Schenley Park Carnegie Mellon University Soldiers and Sailors Memorial Hall and Museum

- Location within the city of Pittsburgh

- Location within the state of Pennsylvania
- Country: United States
- State: Pennsylvania
- County: Allegheny
- City: Pittsburgh

Area
  - Total: 1.50 sq mi (3.9 km^{2})
- Elevation: 1,037 ft (316 m)

Population (2010)
  - Total: 22,210
  - Density: 14,800/sq mi (5,700/km^{2})
- Time zone: UTC-5 (Eastern (EST))
  - Summer (DST): UTC-4 (EDT)
- GNIS feature ID: 1182822

Oakland is an area in Pittsburgh, Pennsylvania. Consisting of four neighborhoods (North Oakland, South Oakland, East Oakland, and West Oakland), it is the academic and healthcare center of Pittsburgh and one of the city's major cultural centers. Home to three universities, museums, hospitals, shopping venues, restaurants, and recreational activities, this section of the city also includes two city-designated historic districts: the mostly residential Schenley Farms Historic District and the predominantly institutional Oakland Civic Center Historic District, as well as the locally designated Oakland Square Historic District.

In addition, the Pittsburgh Bureau of Fire operates Fire Station No. 14 on McKee Place and Fire Station No. 10 on Allequippa Street.

== Neighborhoods ==
North Oakland
- Neighborhood of Pittsburgh

Area
  - Total: 0.499 sq mi (1.29 km^{2})

Population (2010)
  - Total: 10,551
  - Density: 21,100/sq mi (8,160/km^{2})

Central Oakland
- Neighborhood of Pittsburgh

Area
  - Total: 0.281 sq mi (0.73 km^{2})

Population (2010)
  - Total: 6,086
  - Density: 21,700/sq mi (8,360/km^{2})

South Oakland
- Neighborhood of Pittsburgh

Area
  - Total: 0.508 sq mi (1.32 km^{2})

Population (2010)
  - Total: 2,969
  - Density: 5,840/sq mi (2,260/km^{2})

West Oakland
- Neighborhood of Pittsburgh

Area
  - Total: 0.215 sq mi (0.56 km^{2})

Population (2010)
  - Total: 2,604
  - Density: 12,100/sq mi (4,680/km^{2})

Oakland is officially divided into four neighborhoods: North Oakland, West Oakland, Central Oakland, and South Oakland. Each has a unique cultural identity. Oakland is Pittsburgh's second most populated neighborhood, with 22,210 residents, most of whom are students. Scattered amongst Oakland's four neighborhoods are 29 flights of the public stairways in Pittsburgh.

Historical population
| Year | Pop. | ±% |
|---|---|---|
| 1940 | 25,843 | — |
| 1950 | 28,430 | +10.0% |
| 1960 | 23,806 | −16.3% |
| 1970 | 22,702 | −4.6% |
| 1980 | 21,157 | −6.8% |
| 1990 | 21,548 | +1.8% |
| 2000 | 20,417 | −5.2% |
| 2010 | 22,210 | +8.8% |
Source: University of Pittsburgh

=== North Oakland ===
North Oakland can be loosely defined as the area of Oakland between Neville and Bouquet Streets, encompassing all of Craig Street and running north to Polish Hill. The Cathedral of Learning, the engineering or midsection of the University of Pittsburgh campus, and the Craig Street business district are in North Oakland.

RAND's Pittsburgh center is located in North Oakland as well as the long time RIDC business incubator on Henry Street. The Islamic Center of Pittsburgh, the largest mosque in the city, is located in North Oakland. This sector is also home to the Schenley Farms Historic District and many mid-rise condominium and apartment buildings.

=== Central Oakland ===
Central Oakland is bordered by Schenley Park, the Boulevard of the Allies, Fifth Avenue, and Halket Street. Many students at the University of Pittsburgh who decide to live off-campus reside in this neighborhood. Many of its homes are historic masonry structures dating from the turn of the century. The area is often confused with South Oakland. Its Main Business District runs along Forbes and Fifth Avenue, and contains a diversity of restaurants, retailers, and financial services. These businesses are organized by the Oakland Business Improvement District (OBID). Smaller business districts in Central Oakland provide additional dining options along Atwood Street and Semple Street. It is also the location of the relatively isolated and historic neighborhood of Panther Hollow which runs along Boundary Street in Junction Hollow as well as the Oakland Square Historic District.

=== South Oakland ===
South Oakland runs along the Monongahela River and forms a triangular shape between the Monongahela River, the Boulevard of the Allies, and the western bank of Junction Hollow. Magee-Womens Hospital of UPMC and the Pittsburgh Technology Center are major landmarks of this neighborhood. The neighborhood is split between a riverfront flood plain to the southwest and a plateau to the northeast. The plateau is divided into two primarily residential areas which are separated from one another by Bates Street, which runs up a valley from the flood plain to the plateau. The residents of the neighborhood on the north side of Bates Avenue call their neighborhood Oakcliffe. The flood plain was previously packed with industrial sites such as the Pittsburgh Works Consolidated Gas Co. and the Jones & Laughlin Steel Co., but presently, the Pittsburgh Technology Center hosts facilities such as the Entertainment Technology Center of Carnegie Mellon University.

Many residents of Central Oakland - as well as news outlets - often consider their neighborhood part of South Oakland. However, the longstanding border between Central Oakland and South Oakland was established long ago along the Boulevard of the Allies. Forbes Avenue provides much of the neighborhood's northern boundary.

South Oakland is reputed to be a student neighborhood, but only 36.9% of its population is between the ages of 18 and 24, compared to Central Oakland's figure of 74.1%. The difference is largely because the area between Forbes Avenue and the Boulevard of the Allies houses many undergraduate students. While it is commonly considered to be in South Oakland, it is actually the heart of Central Oakland.

South Oakland was the childhood home of Andy Warhol, and later the residence of fellow pop artist Keith Haring. Haring had his first art show while living in Oakland. NFL Hall of Fame Quarterback Dan Marino was also born in Oakland, not far from Warhol's home. Dan Marino Field on Frazier Street was named in honor of its native son. Although they were not contemporaries, Warhol and Marino grew up on the same block with their former houses only a few doors apart.

=== West Oakland ===
West Oakland is bordered by Fifth Avenue in the south, DeSoto Street in the east, the Birmingham Bridge to the west, and Aliquippa Street to the north. While the smallest of the Oakland districts, the neighborhood hosts a range of commercial and residential dwellings.

Among notable commercial operations exists Carlow University and most of the University of Pittsburgh Medical Center, including UPMC Presbyterian and UPMC Montefiore.

The residential makeup is diverse and consists of a number of long-time, permanent residents living alongside students completing their undergrad and graduate degrees. Many permanent residents have called West Oakland home dating back to around 1990, when a program to incentivize first time home buyers actively brought the neighborhood to life.

=== Not Oakland ===
Although the campus of Carnegie Mellon University and parts of Schenley Park, including Phipps Conservatory & Botanical Gardens and Flagstaff Hill, are popularly referred to as being in Oakland, and are located in the 15213 zip code, they are actually part of the adjacent neighborhood of Squirrel Hill North. The border between Oakland and Squirrel Hill runs along Junction Hollow.

== History ==
The name first appeared in 1839 in a local paper, Harris' Intelligencer. The area got its name from the abundance of oak trees found on the farm of William Eichbaum, who settled there in 1840. Oakland developed rapidly following the Great Fire of 1845 in Downtown Pittsburgh, with many people moving out to suburban territory. By 1860, there was considerable commercial development along Fifth Avenue.

In 1868, Oakland Township, just two years after seceding from Pitt Township, was annexed to the City of Pittsburgh. Twenty-one years later, Mary Schenley gave the city 300 acres in Oakland for a park. Officials bought another 100 acres from her for "Schenley Park." And Mary Schenley gave another gift: land for Schenley Plaza. At Schenley Plaza, industrialist Andrew Carnegie built a library, museum and concert hall complex, which opened in 1895.

In 1917, Teddy Roosevelt visited the neighborhood.

Oakland has long been considered Pittsburgh's university center. Carnegie Mellon University is the result of a 1967 merger of the Carnegie Institute of Technology, founded in Oakland in 1900 by Andrew Carnegie, and Mellon Institute, founded in 1913 by Andrew W. and Richard B. Mellon to conduct industrial research. The University of Pittsburgh, which is heir to the Pittsburgh Academy that was incorporated in 1787, relocated to Oakland in 1909 from its campus that was then in Allegheny.

Some of the most impressive architecture in Oakland is on Pitt's campus. In 1925, work began on what was then the world's tallest educational building, the 42-story Cathedral of Learning. Although the Cathedral of Learning is now the fourth-tallest educationally purposed building in the world, it remains the world's second tallest university building, the tallest educational building in the Western Hemisphere, and the second tallest gothic-styled building in the world. Oakland is also home to the university's French-Gothic revival Heinz Memorial Chapel and St. Paul Cathedral, the seat of the Roman Catholic Diocese of Pittsburgh. It is also home of the main branch of the Carnegie Library, the Carnegie Museum, and Phipps Conservatory.

Oakland also contained Forbes Field, which was built in 1909 as the third home to the Pittsburgh Pirates and first home to the Pittsburgh Steelers. While Forbes Field was closed in 1970, some remnants of the ballpark stands, such as a section of the outfield wall. Pirates fans gather on the site each year on the anniversary of Bill Mazeroski's World Series winning home run on October 13, 1960.

The Decade nightclub was a staple of the neighborhood in the 1970s and 1980s.

== Surrounding neighborhoods ==
North Oakland has eight borders with the Pittsburgh neighborhoods of Bloomfield to the northeast, Shadyside and Squirrel Hill North to the east, Central Oakland to the south, West Oakland to the southwest, the Terrace Village region of the Hill District to the west, the Upper Hill District to the northwest Polish Hill to the north-northwest. North Oakland also runs catty-corner (without a direct border) with Lower Lawrenceville to the north with its meeting point in the middle of the Bloomfield Bridge.

Central Oakland has five Pittsburgh neighborhood borders, including North Oakland to the north, Squirrel Hill North to the northeast, Squirrel Hill South to the east, South Oakland to the south and southwest, and West Oakland to the northwest.

South Oakland has six land borders, including the Pittsburgh neighborhoods of Central Oakland to the northeast, Squirrel Hill South to the east, Greenfield to the southeast, Hazelwood to the south-southeast, Bluff to the west, and West Oakland to the northwest. Across the Monongahela River, South Oakland runs adjacent with Pittsburgh's South Side Flats neighborhood.

West Oakland has six borders with the Pittsburgh neighborhoods of North Oakland to the northeast, Central Oakland to the southeast, South Oakland to the south and south-southeast, Bluff to the southwest, and the Crawford-Roberts and Terrace Village regions of the Hill District to the west and northwest, respectively.

== Sites ==
- The neighborhood is the location of the massive Carnegie culture complex, originally funded by Andrew Carnegie, which includes the Carnegie Museum of Natural History, Carnegie Museum of Art, Carnegie Library of Pittsburgh, and Carnegie Music Hall.
- Oakland is home to St. Nicholas Greek Orthodox Cathedral, sponsor of the annual Greek Food Festival, as well as St. Paul Cathedral, mother church of the Diocese of Pittsburgh, and the neighboring Pittsburgh Chinese Church, and St. George Orthodox Cathedral, the seat of the bishop of the Diocese of Charleston, Oakland, and the Mid-Atlantic.
- Oakland's University of Pittsburgh Medical Center pioneered modern organ transplant surgery (home of Dr. Thomas Starzl). In 1955, the first effective polio vaccine was developed by Dr. Jonas Salk at the University of Pittsburgh School of Medicine.
- Oakland was, at various points, the home of many professional Pittsburgh sports teams, including the hockey Pittsburgh Pirates (NHL), Pittsburgh Steelers and the baseball Pittsburgh Pirates. They played at now-defunct venues such as the Duquesne Gardens, Pitt Stadium, and Forbes Field.
- The Pittsburgh Symphony and many touring plays and musical acts performed at the also now-defunct Syria Mosque. The Pittsburgh Civic Light Opera also called the neighborhood home, performing until 1961 at Pitt Stadium. The Pittsburgh Playhouse was founded in Oakland.
- WQED, Pittsburgh's PBS station and the first community-sponsored television station in the United States, has been located in Oakland since 1954, although it moved from its original building to a new, larger one in 1970. WQED's first building, which had originally been the manse of a neighboring church, is now the Music Building of the University of Pittsburgh's main campus. Mr. Rogers' Neighborhood, the nationally syndicated children's show, was taped at WQED's studios in Oakland.
- WDTV-TV, now KDKA-TV, the region's first television station, went on the air at the Syria Mosque in Oakland on 11 January 1949. The event, aired on all four TV networks of the time DuMont, CBS, NBC, and ABC, was the first to "network" East Coast and Midwest TV stations into a modern "television network" of Pittsburgh and 13 other cities from Boston to St. Louis.
- Oakland is less than 3 miles (4.8 km) from Downtown Pittsburgh, and as a whole is bordered by Shadyside, Squirrel Hill, the Hill District, Greenfield, Bloomfield, and Bluff.

=== Other attractions ===
==== Museums and galleries ====
- Carnegie Museum of Art
- Carnegie Museum of Natural History
- Kimbo Art Gallery and International Jazz Hall of Fame (Pitt Union)
- Dental and Pharmacy Museums (Salk Hall)
- Latin American Cultural Center
- ICA Pittsburgh (Note: Although adjacent to Oakland, these attractions are technically just within the official border of Squirrel Hill North although they are almost always popularly considered to be located in Oakland.)
- Nationality Rooms
- Nicholas Lochoff Cloister and University Arts Gallery (Pitt)
- Soldiers and Sailors National Military Museum and Memorial
- Stephen Foster Memorial

==== Music and theater ====
- Bellefield Hall
- Carnegie Mellon Philharmonic
- Carnegie Mellon University Kiltie Band
- Carnegie Music Hall
- Friday Nite Improvs
- Heinz Chapel Choir
- Opera Theater of Pittsburgh
- Petersen Events Center
- Pitt African Music and Dance Ensemble
- Pitt Jazz Ensemble
- Pitt Men's Glee Club
- Purnell Center for the Arts
- Scotch'n'Soda
- Stephen Foster Memorial
- Studio Theatre (Cathedral of Learning)
- University of Pittsburgh Orchestra
- University of Pittsburgh Stages
- University of Pittsburgh Varsity Marching Band

==== National Register of Historic Places ====
- Cathedral of Learning
- Carnegie Institute and Library
- Henry Clay Frick Training School for Teachers
- Schenley Farms Historic District
- Schenley High School building
- Soldiers and Sailors Memorial Hall
- Mellon Institute
- Phipps Conservatory
- Pittsburgh Athletic Association

==== Churches ====
- Bellefield Presbyterian Church
- Cathedral of Saint Paul in Pittsburgh
- First Baptist Church
- Heinz Memorial Chapel (University of Pittsburgh)
- St. Nicholas Greek Orthodox Cathedral
- The Ryan Catholic Newman Center: Oratory of St. Philip Neri
- Church of the Ascension

==== Education and hospitals ====
- Carlow University
- Carnegie Mellon University
- Fanny Edel Falk Laboratory School
- Pittsburgh Public Schools
- Pittsburgh Science and Technology Academy
- Pittsburgh Supercomputing Center
- University of Pittsburgh
- University of Pittsburgh Medical Center Presbyterian (UPMC)

==== Libraries ====
- Carnegie Library of Pittsburgh (Main)
- Grace Library (Carlow University)
- Hillman Library (University of Pittsburgh)
- Hunt Library (Carnegie Mellon University)

==== Parks and gardens ====
- Cathedral of Learning Lawn
- Kraus Campo
- Petersen Events Center Lawn
- Phipps Conservatory & Botanical Gardens
- Soldiers and Sailors Lawn
- Schenley Park
- Schenley Plaza

==== Sculpture and memorials ====
- Christopher Lyman Magee Memorial
- "Dippy"
- Forbes Field remnants and plaza
- The Hiker
- Light Up
- Man
- A Song to Nature
- Ode to Space
- University of Pittsburgh Panthers
- Stephen Foster
- Walking to the Sky

== Notable people ==
- Lester Goran, writer and professor, University of Miami
- Dan Marino, former Miami Dolphins quarterback and Pro Football Hall of Fame member
- Andy Warhol, artist and filmmaker

== Gallery ==
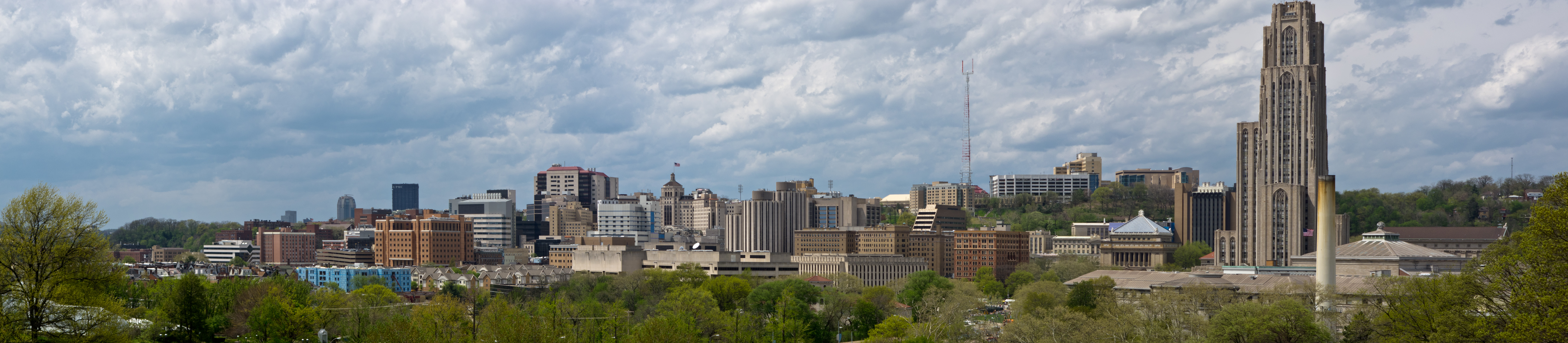
The skyline of West, Central, and North Oakland as viewed from Flagstaff Hill
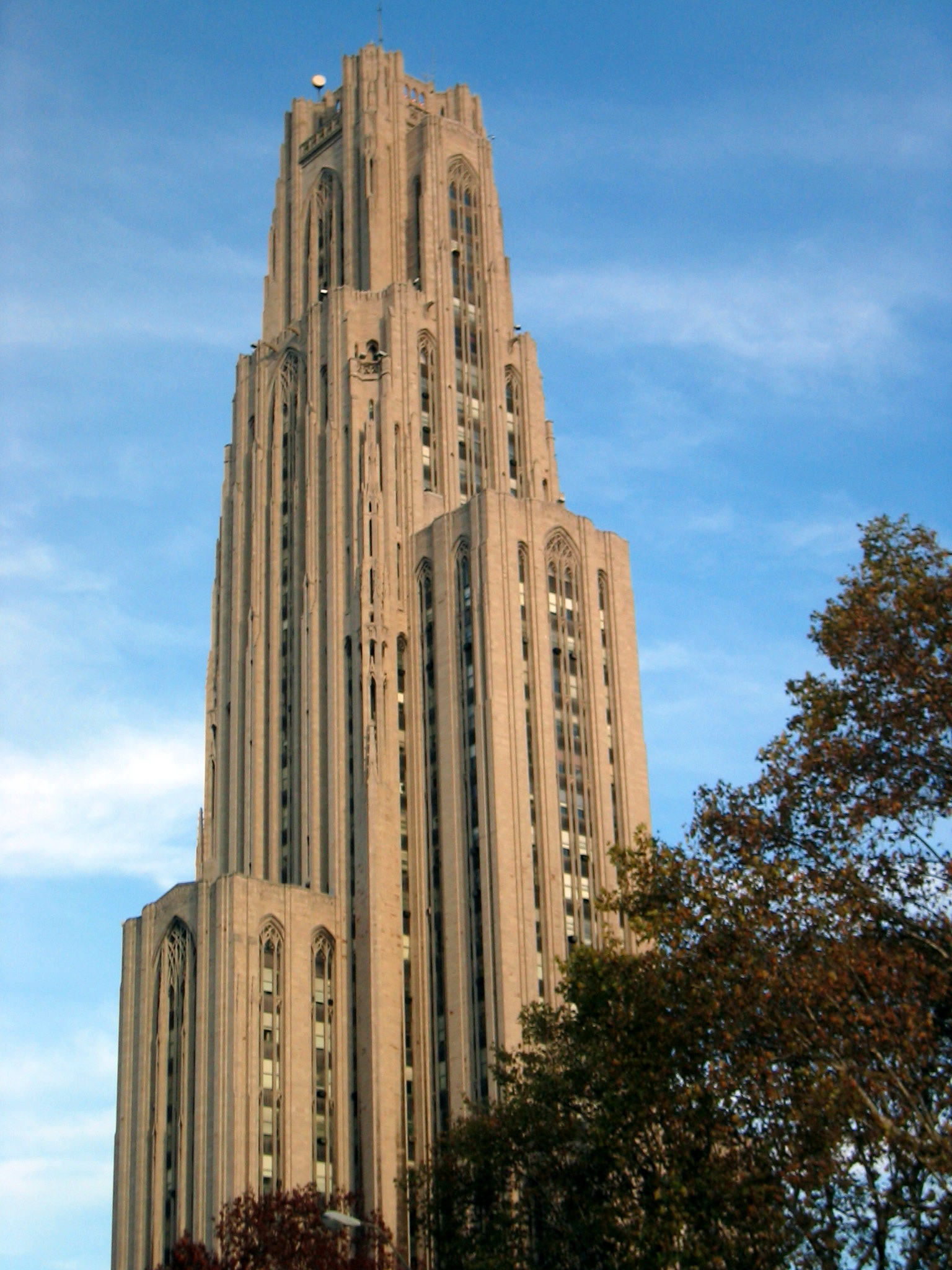
University of Pittsburgh's Cathedral of Learning

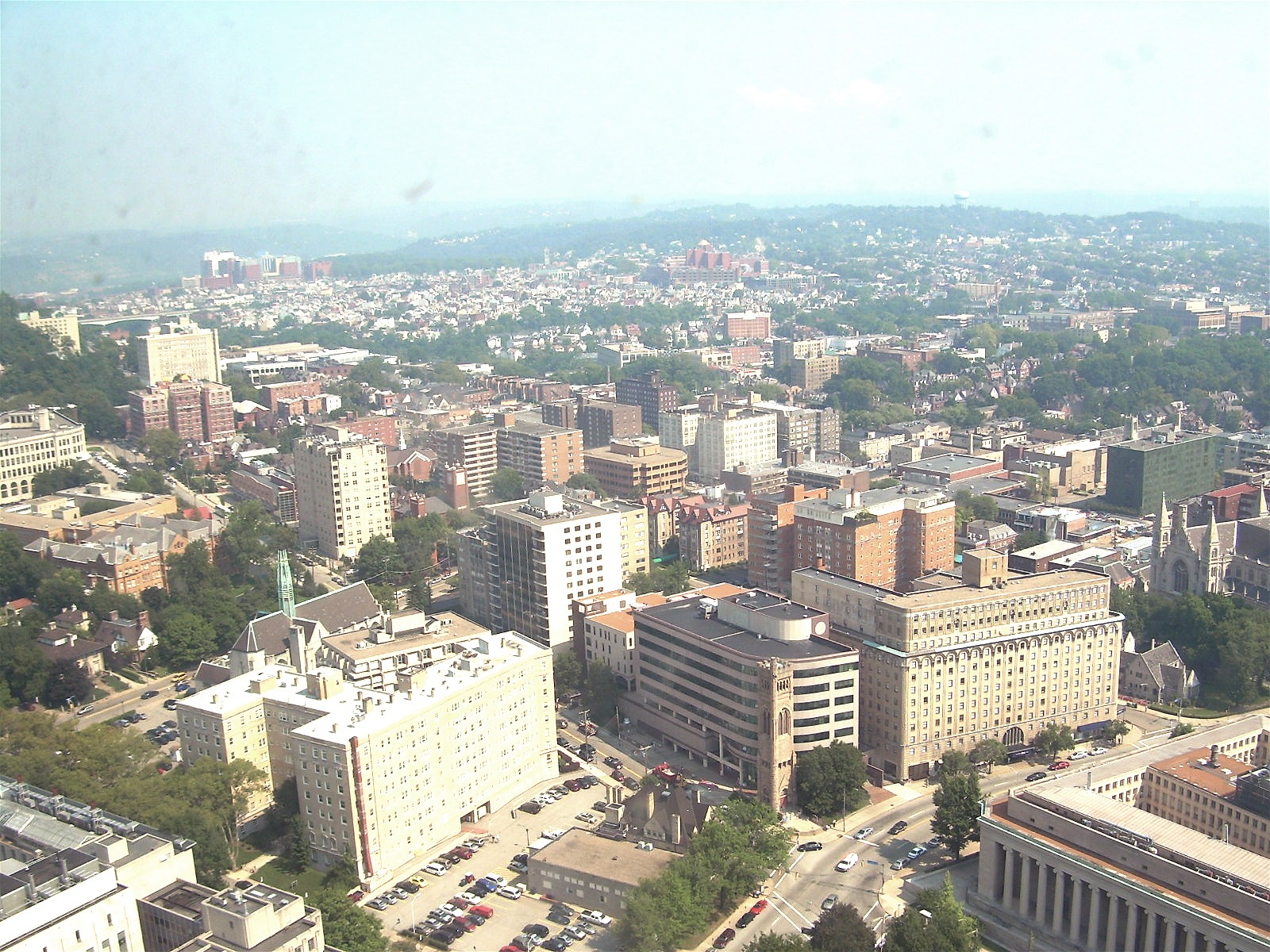
North Oakland seen from near the top of the Cathedral of Learning

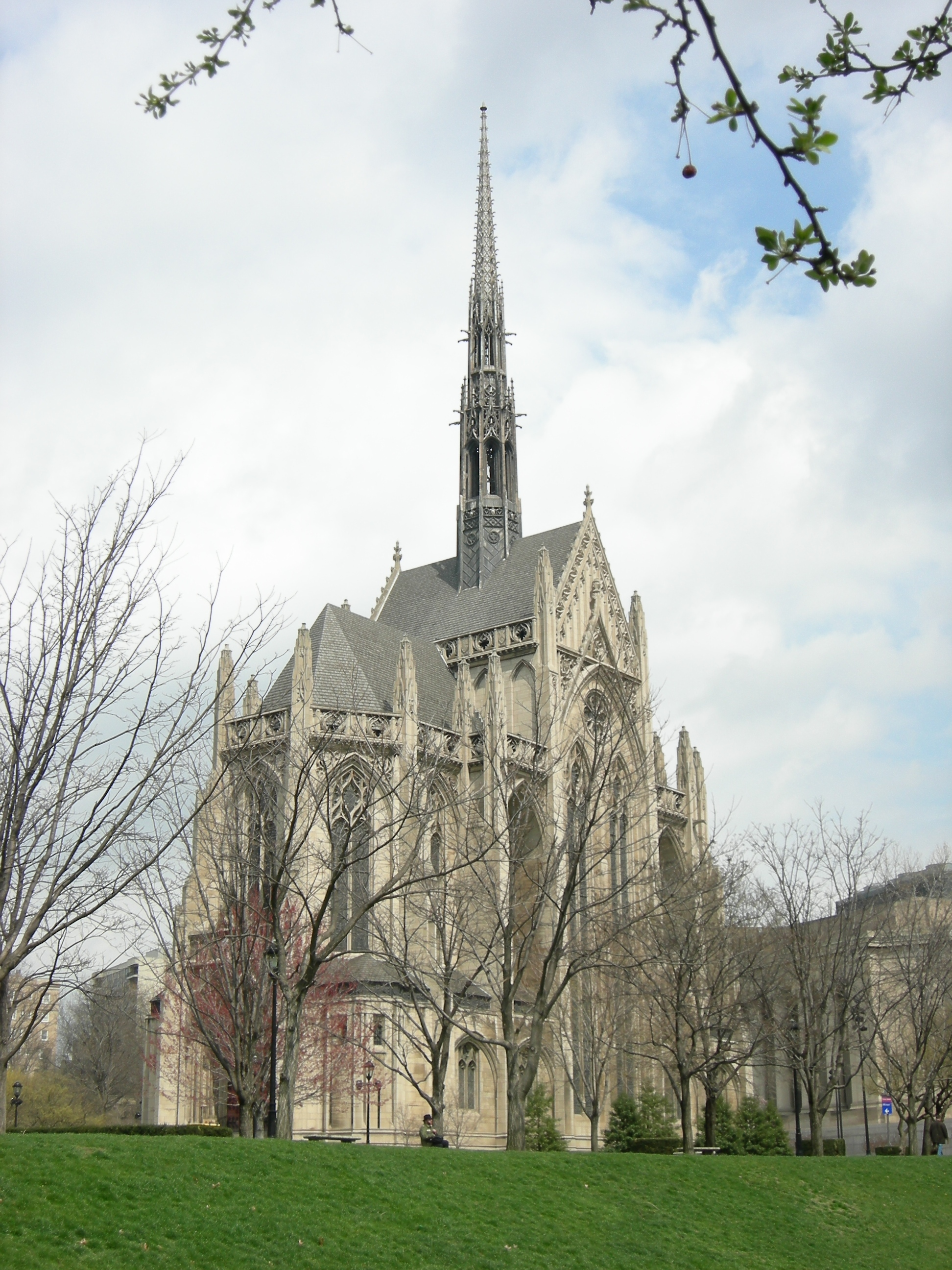
Heinz Memorial Chapel at the University of Pittsburgh

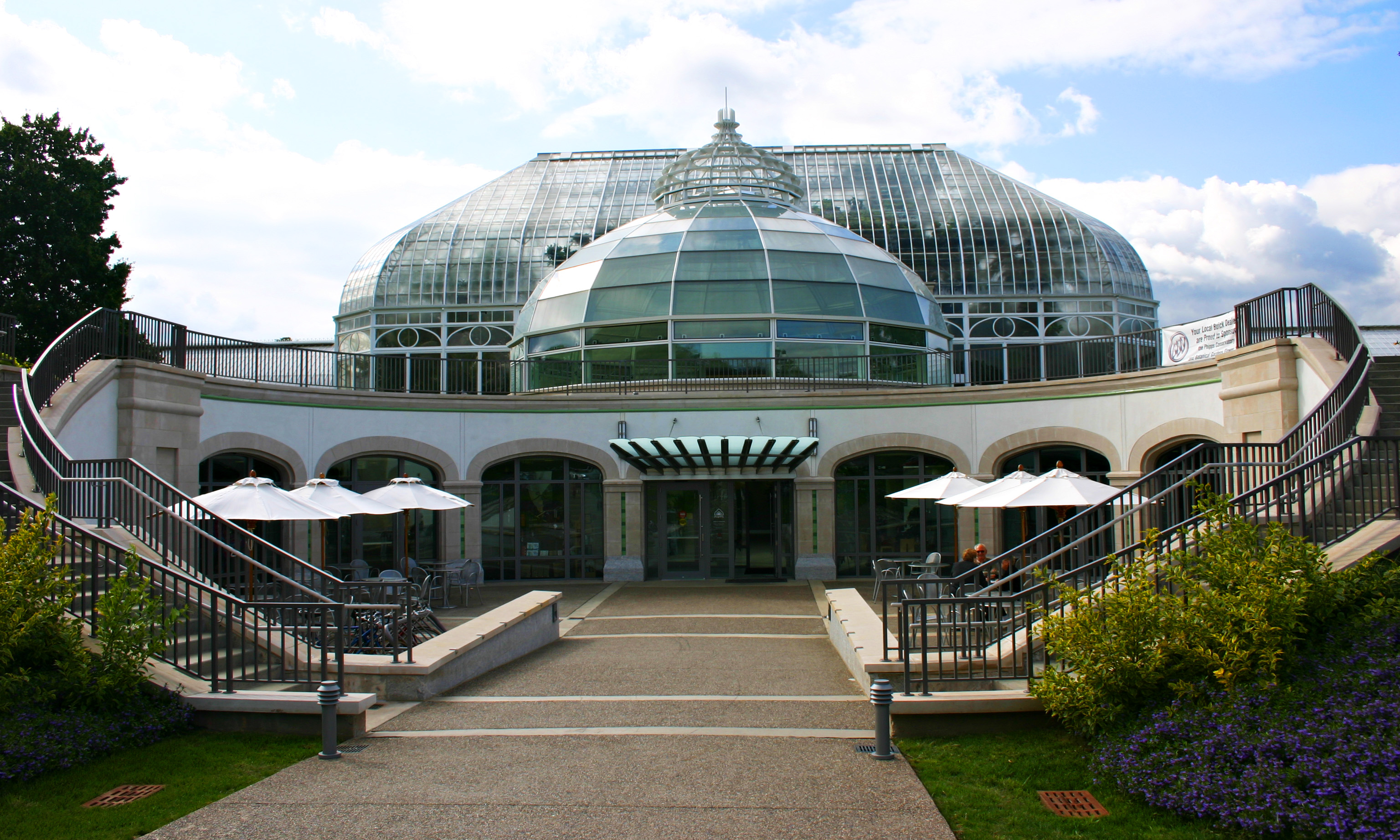
Phipps Conservatory & Botanical Gardens

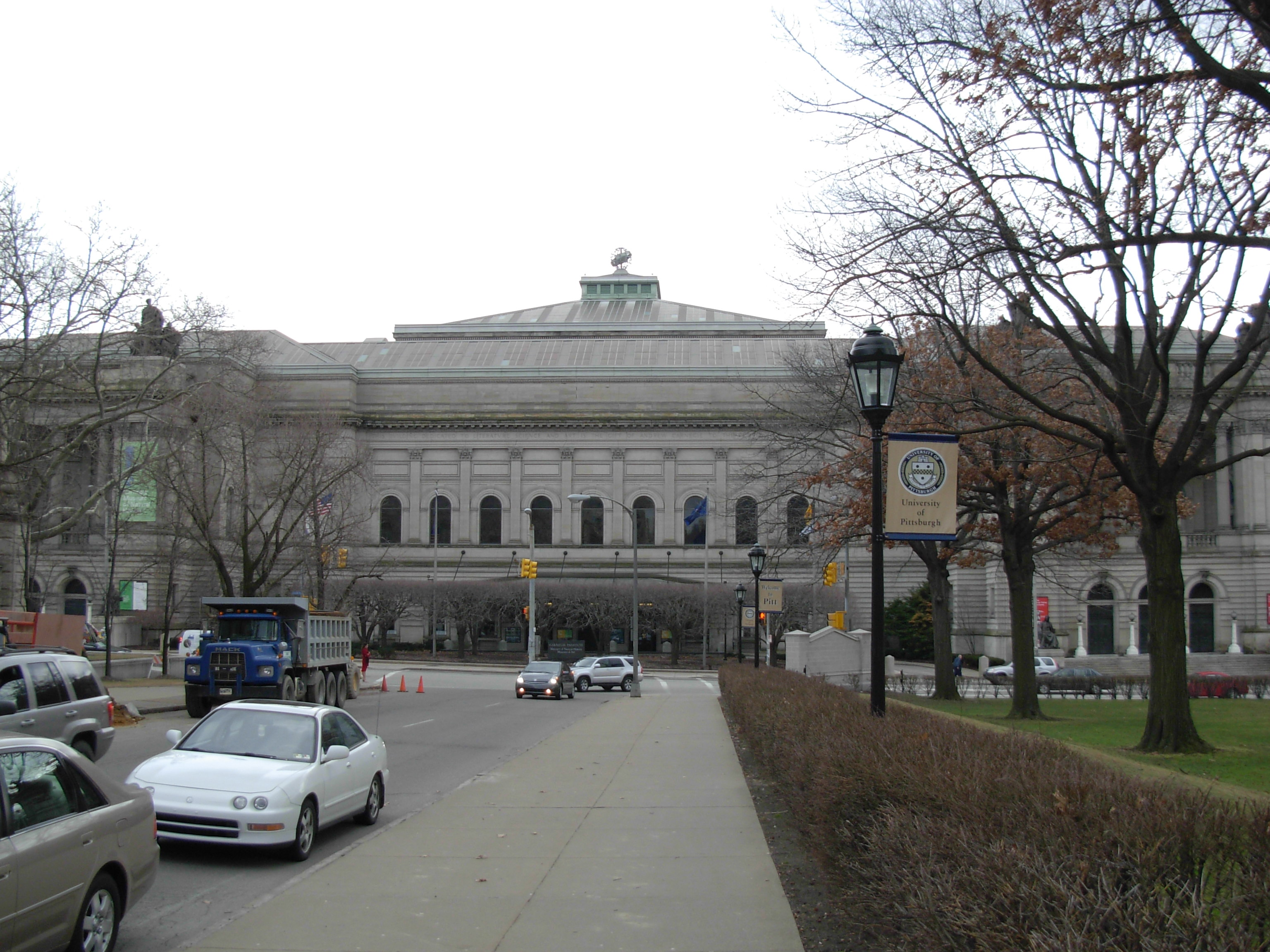
The Carnegie Museums

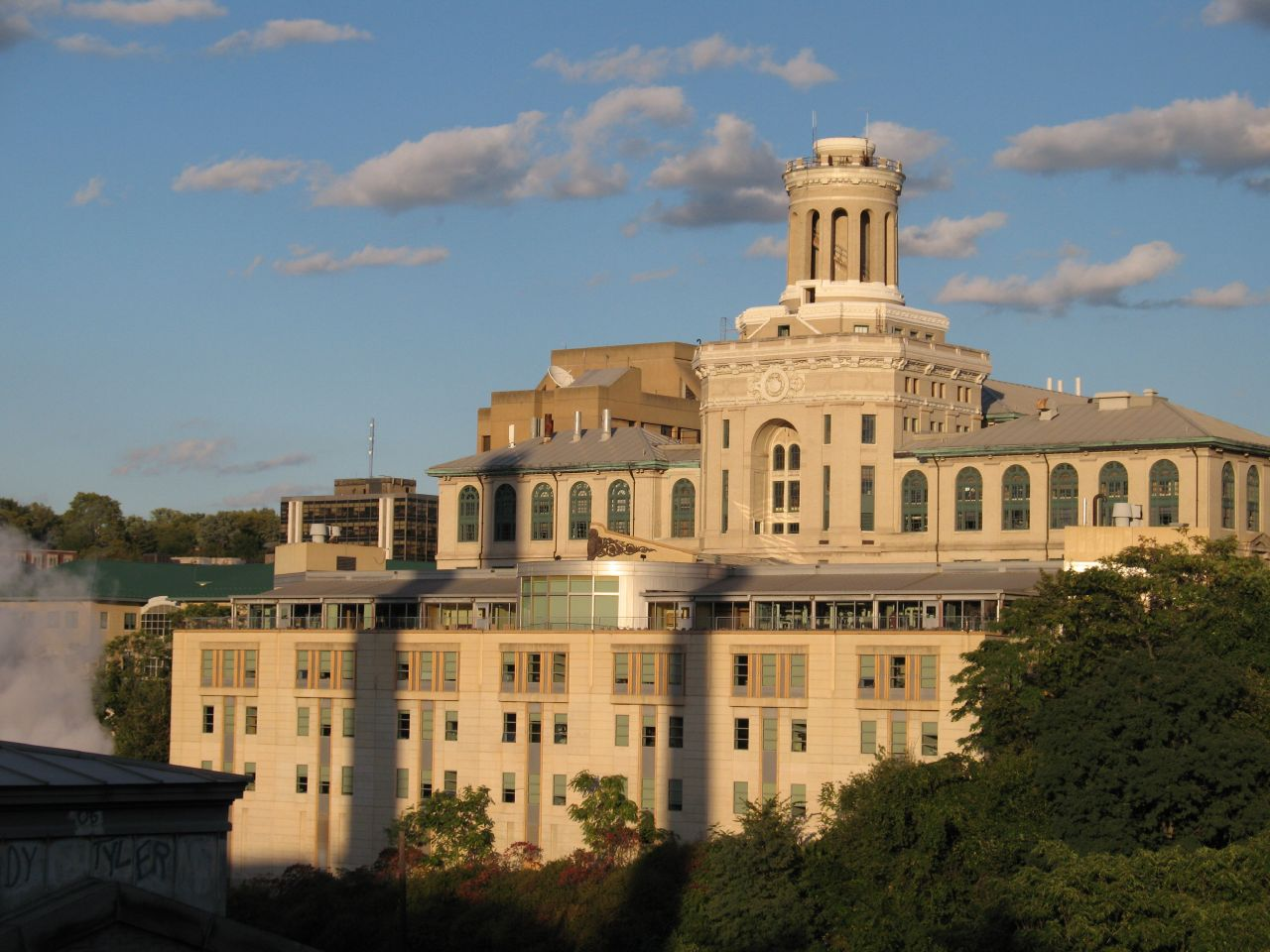
Hamerschlag Hall at Carnegie Mellon University

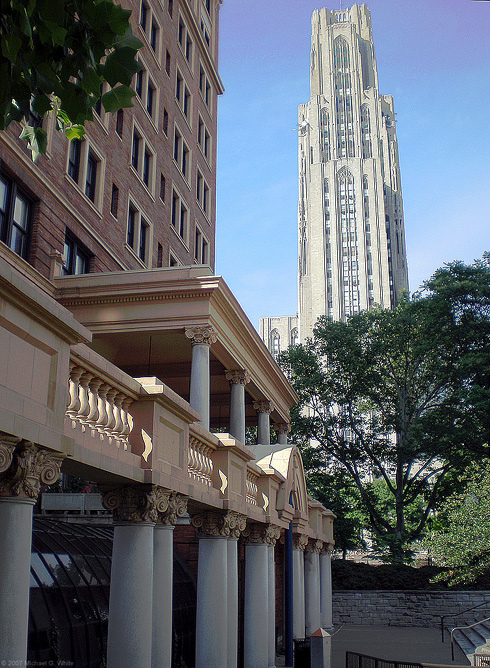
Cathedral of Learning viewed from the William Pitt Union

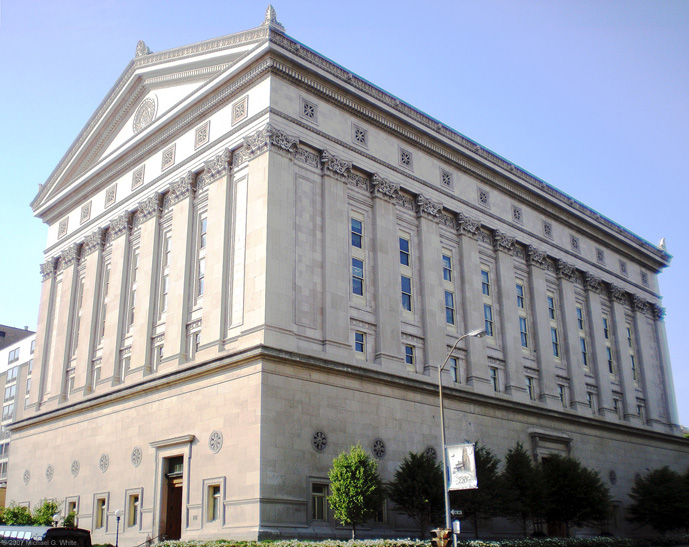
The University of Pittsburgh's Alumni Hall

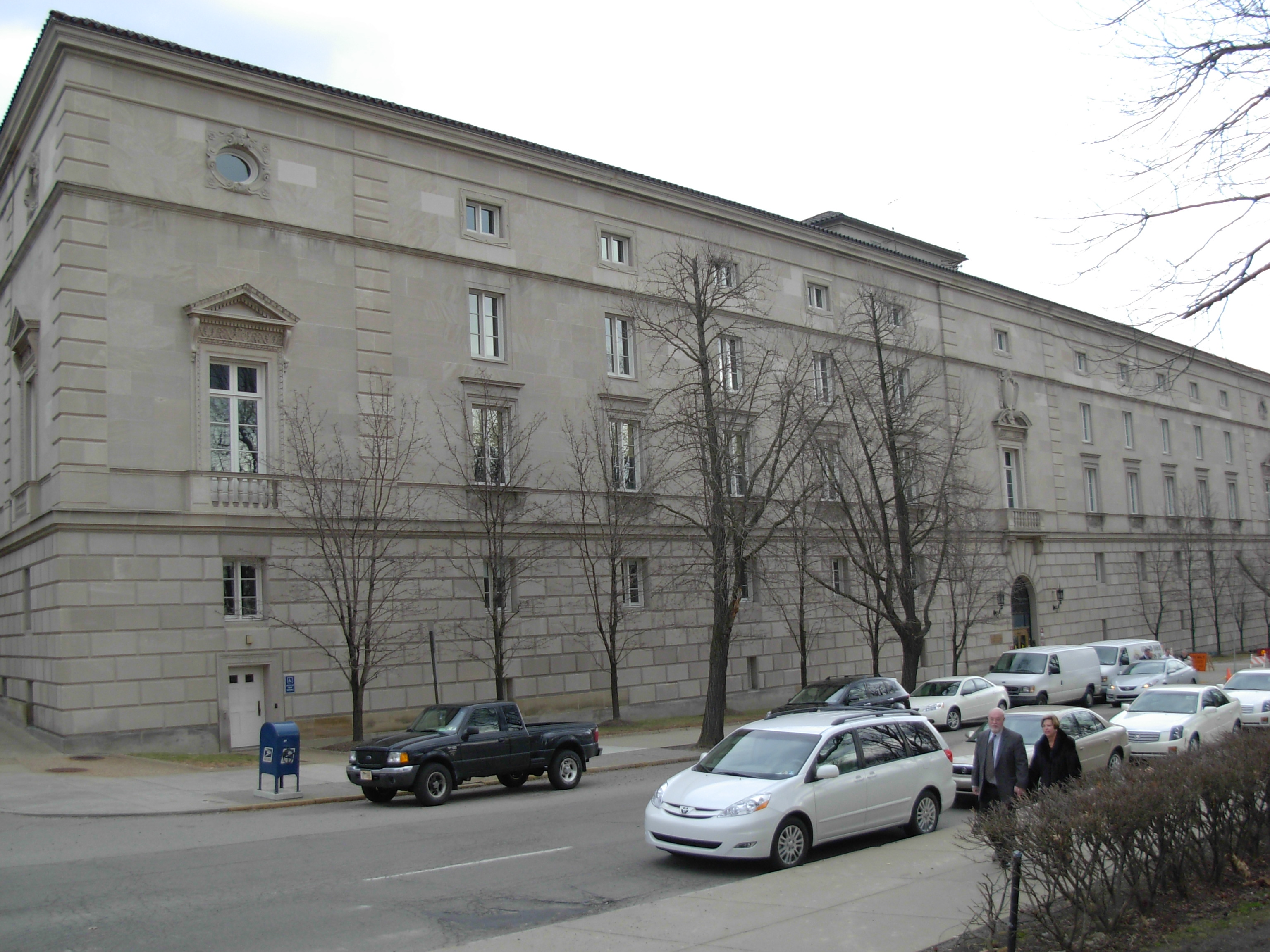
The Pittsburgh Public Schools' Board of Education administration building

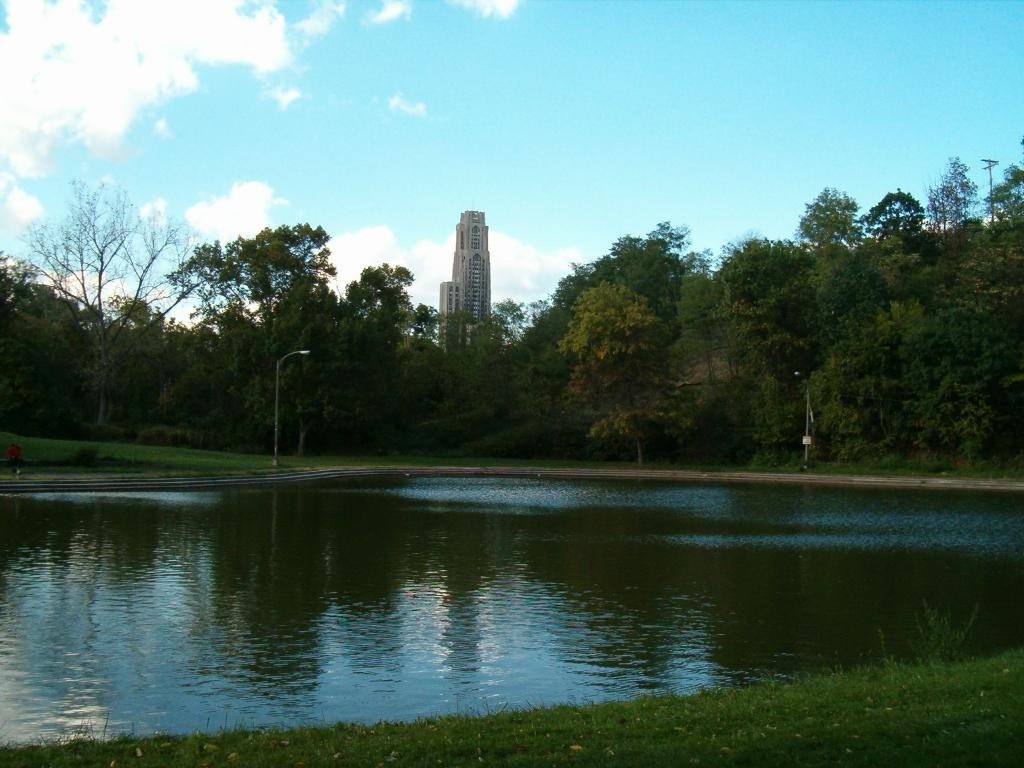
Panther Hollow Lake in Schenley Park

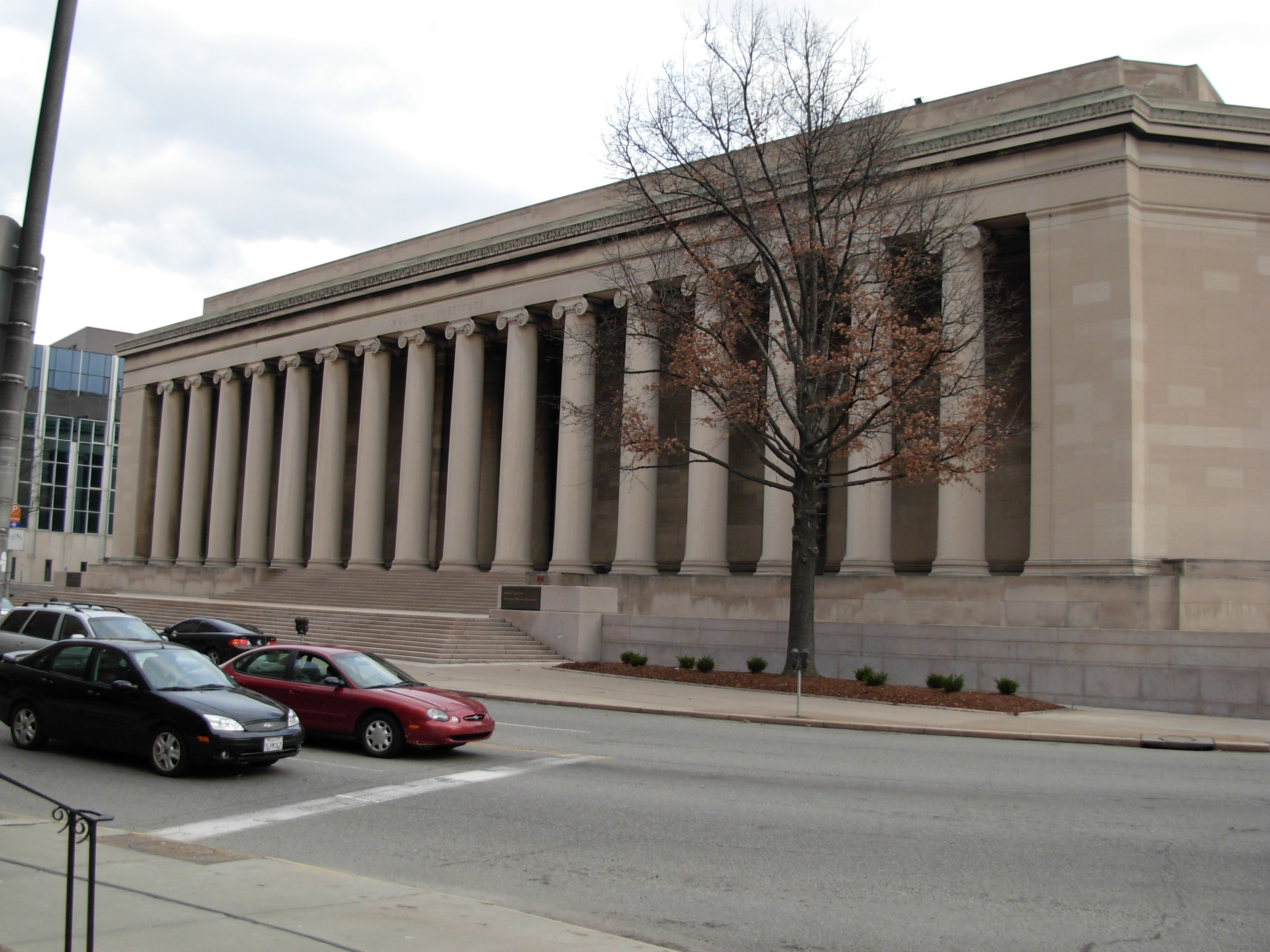
Carnegie Mellon University's Mellon Institute

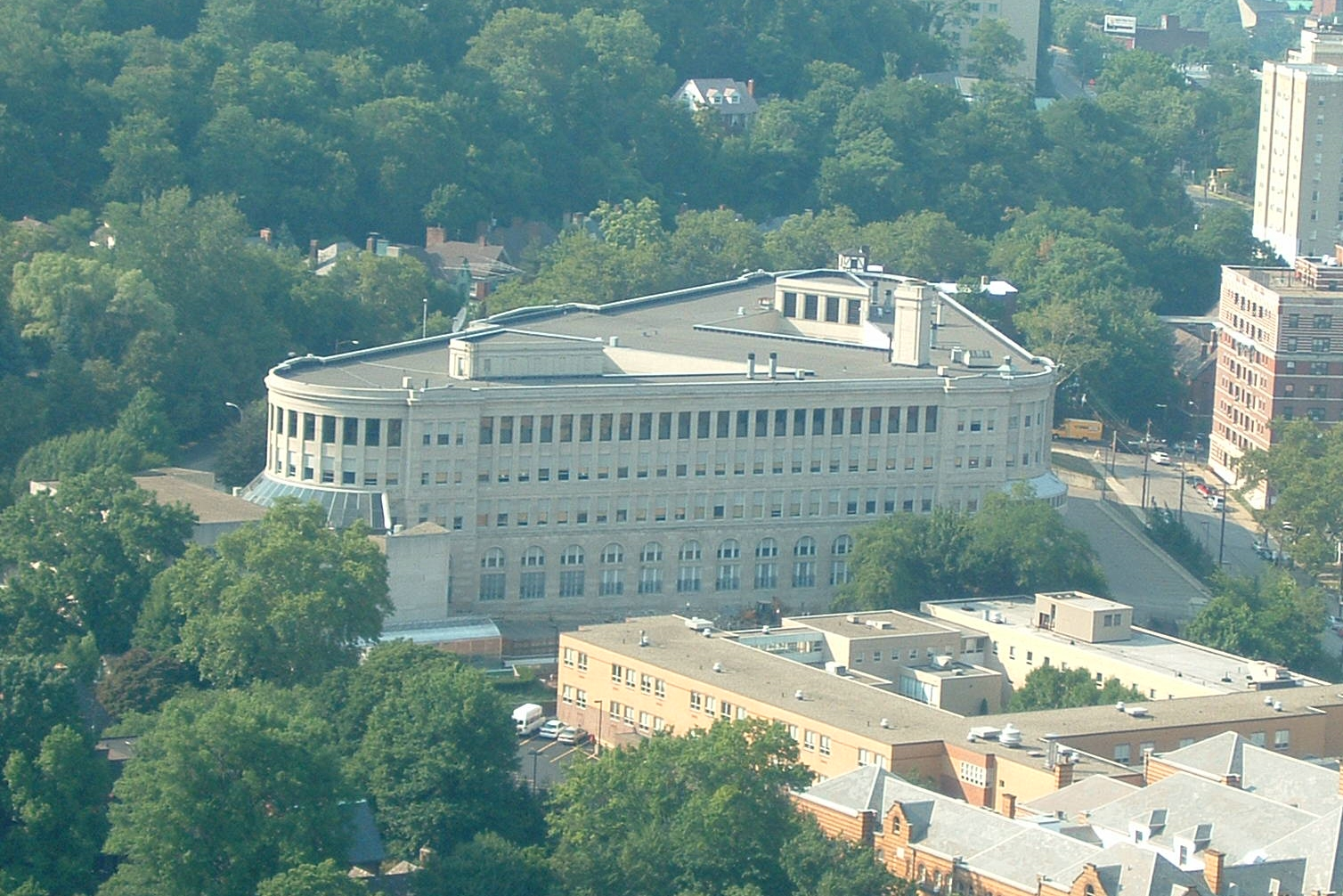
Aerial view of Pittsburgh Public Schools' historic Schenley High School

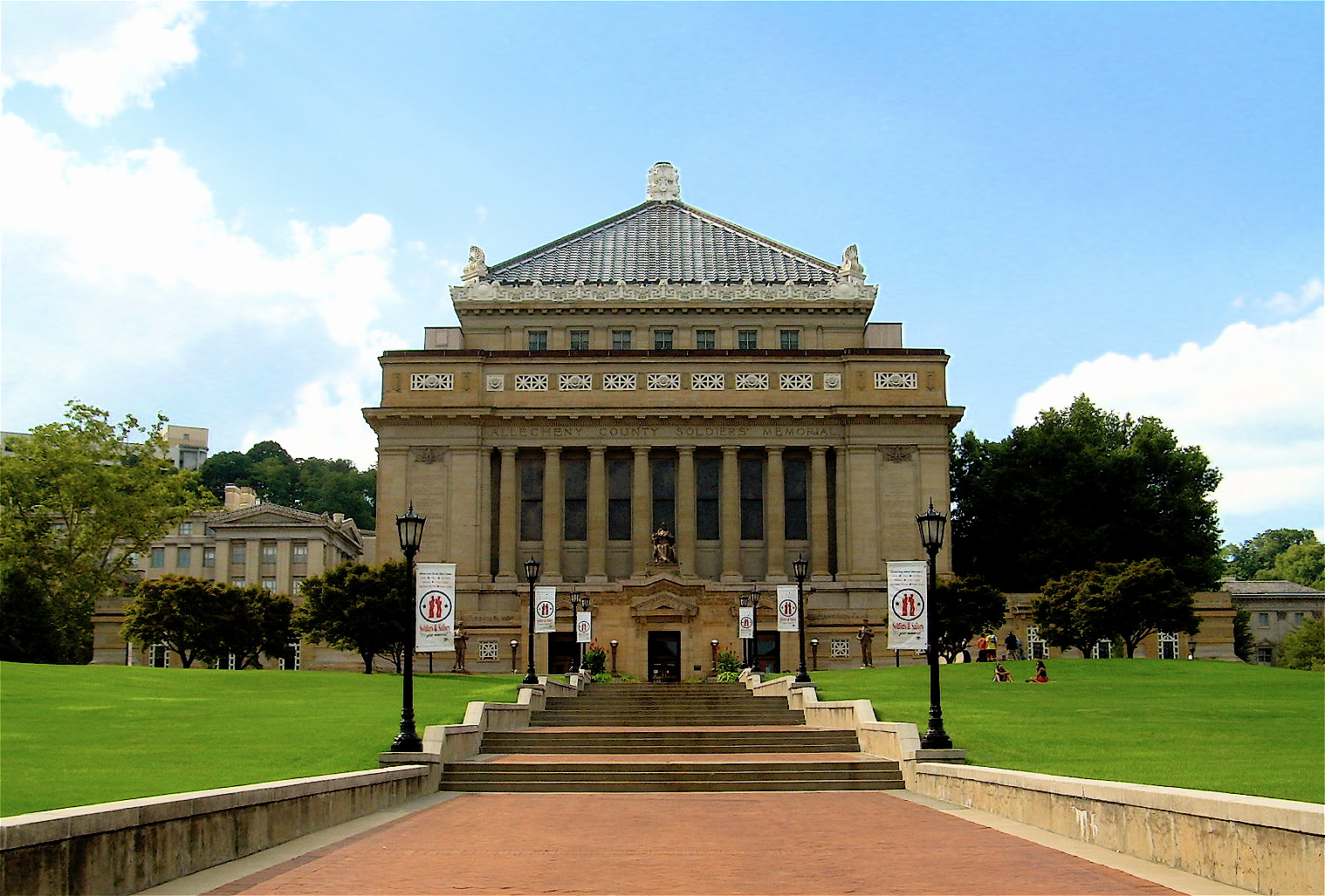
Soldier and Sailors' Memorial on 5th Avenue in North Oakland

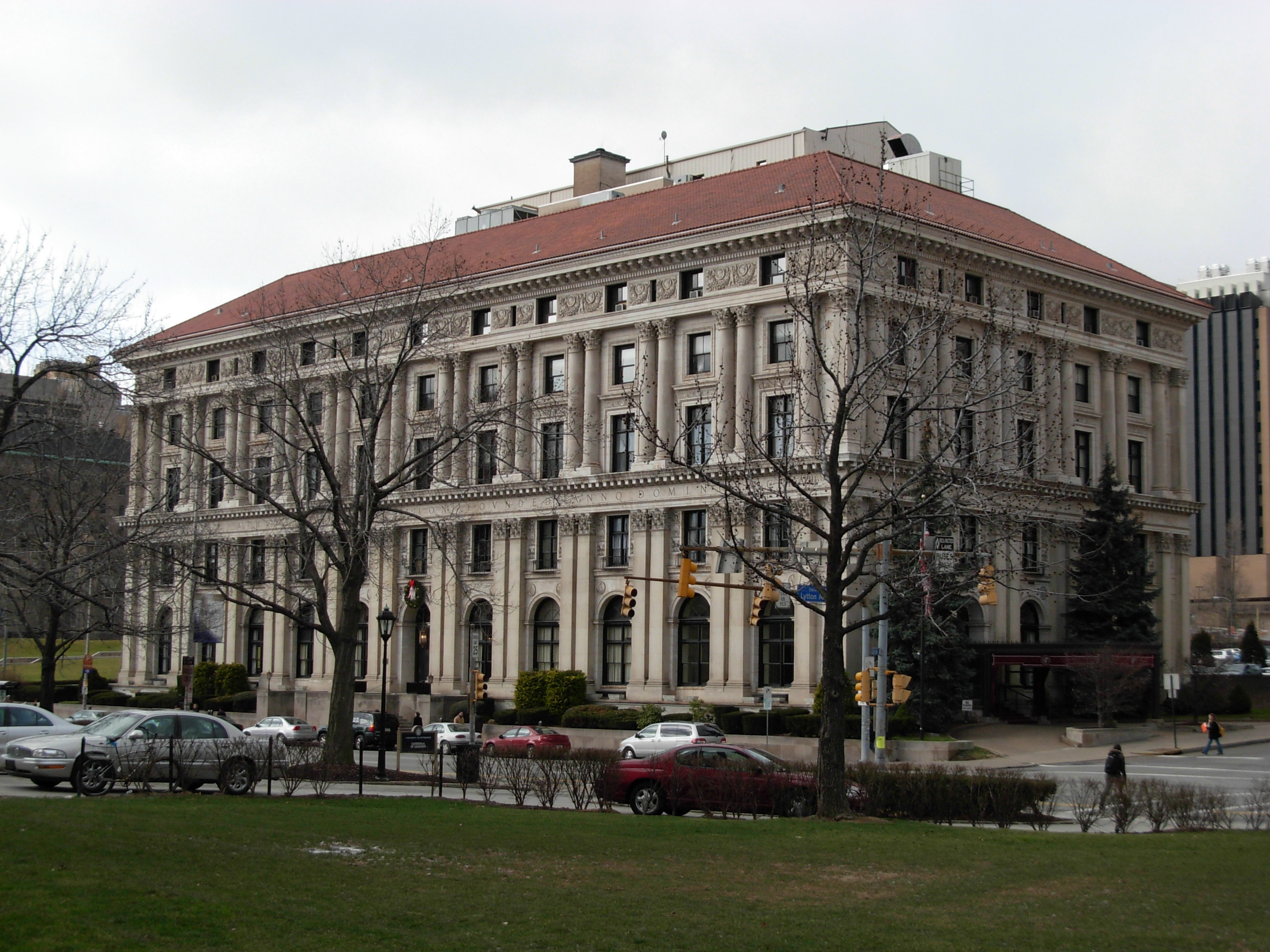
Pittsburgh Athletic Association, built 1909–1911, at the corner of Fifth Avenue and Bigelow Boulevard

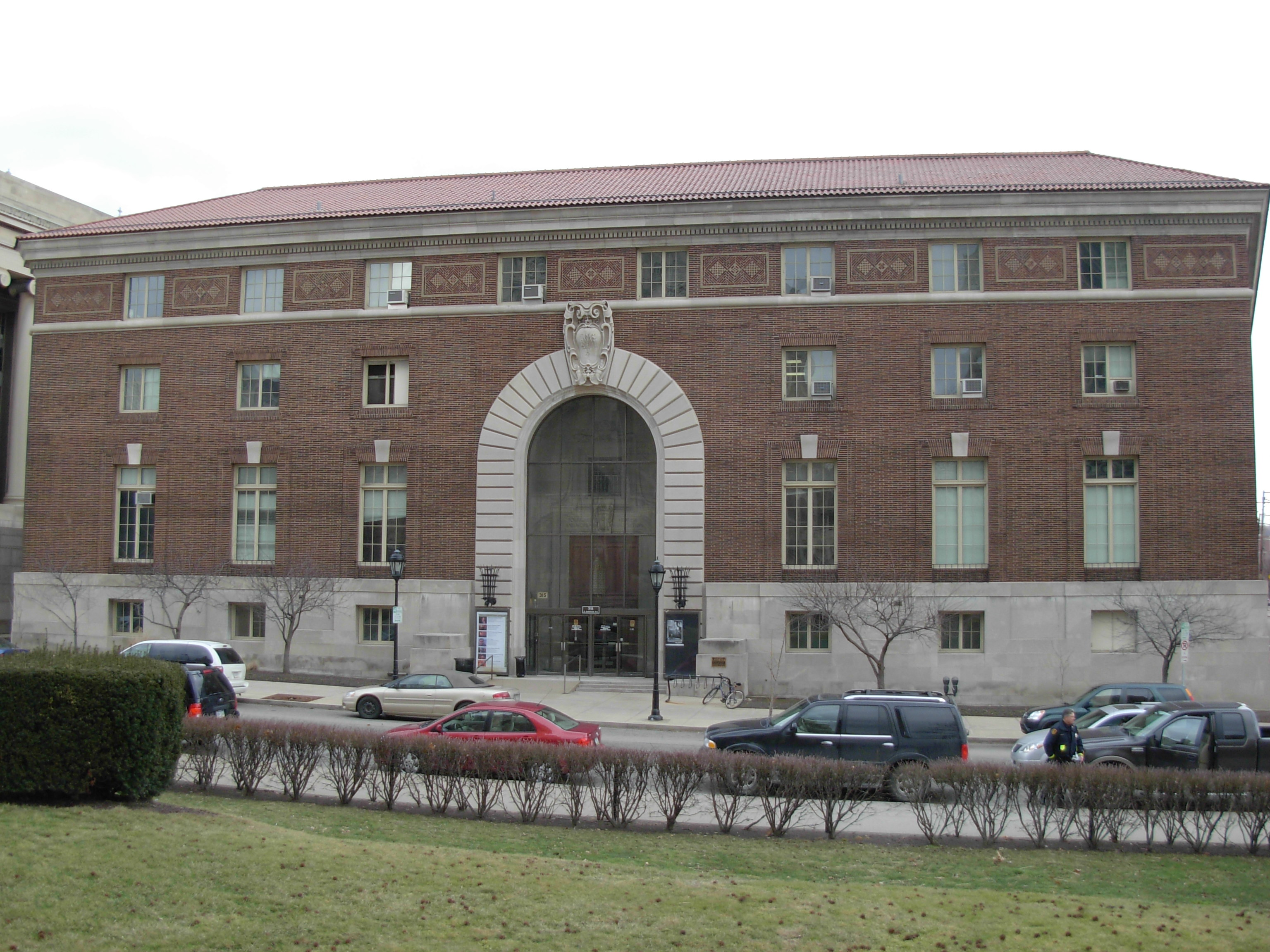
The former Y.M.H.A., is now Pitt's Bellefield Hall

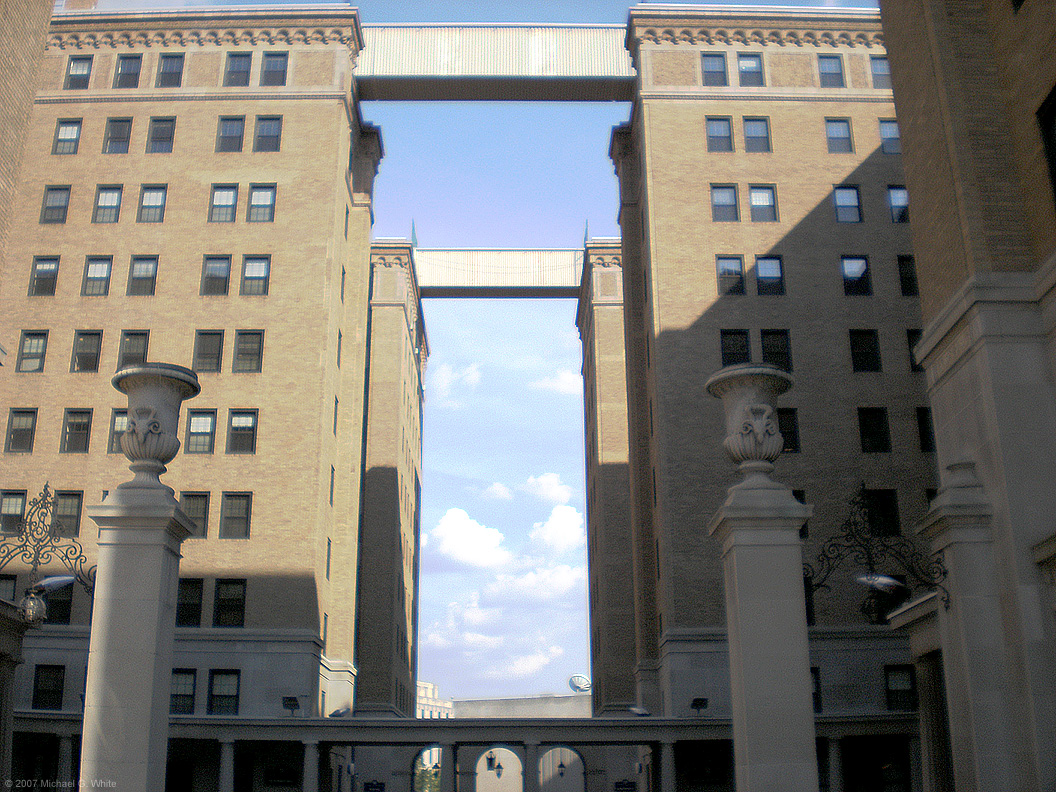
The former Schenley Apartments, now Schenley Quadrangle residences at the University of Pittsburgh

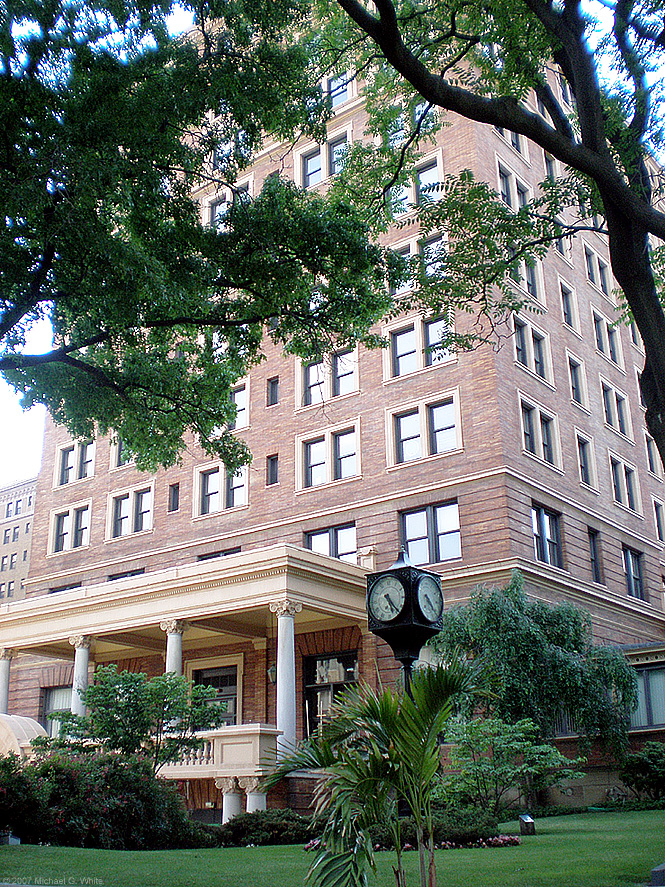
The former Schenley Hotel, now the University of Pittsburgh's William Pitt Union

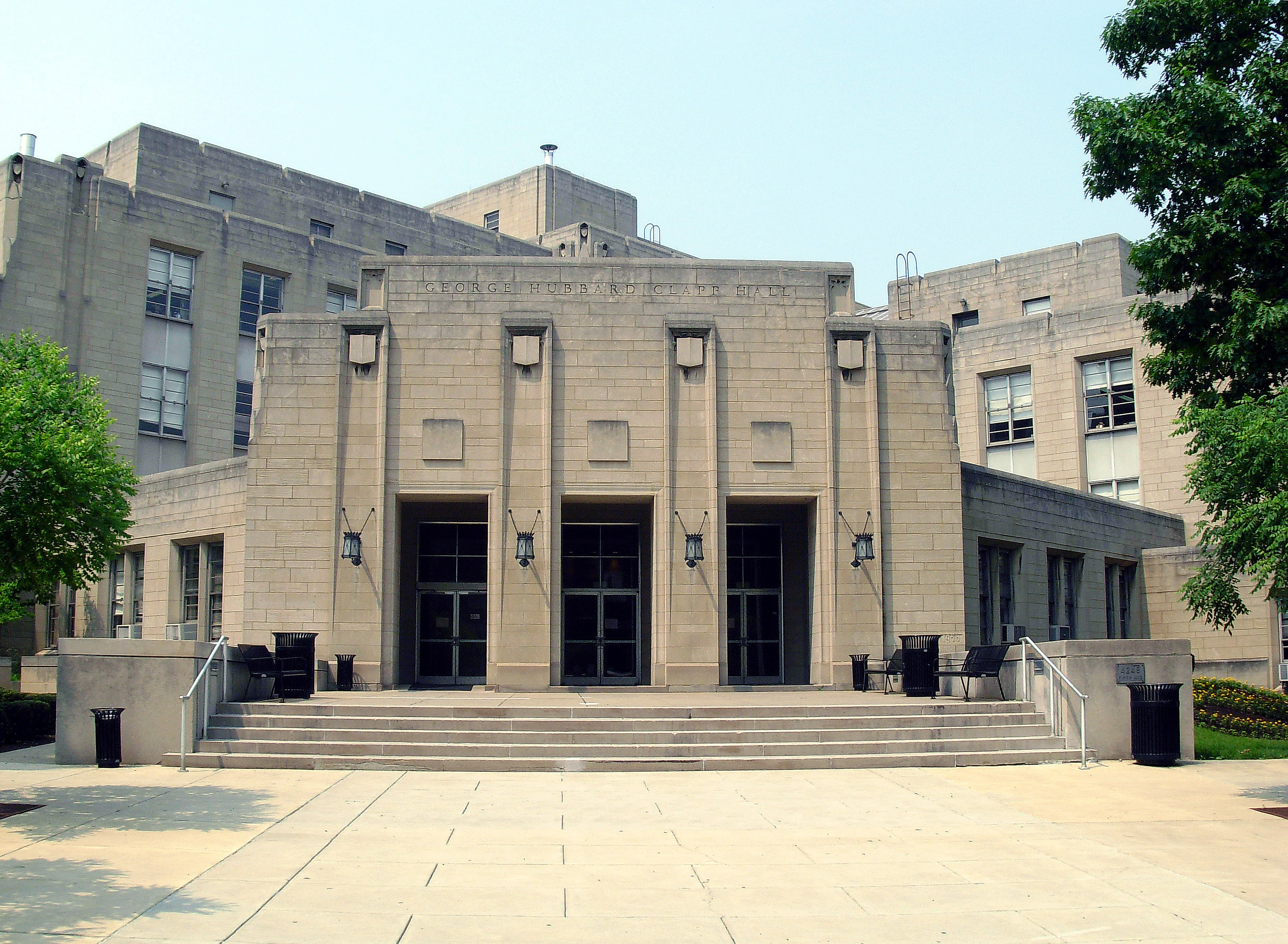
Clapp Hall at the University of Pittsburgh

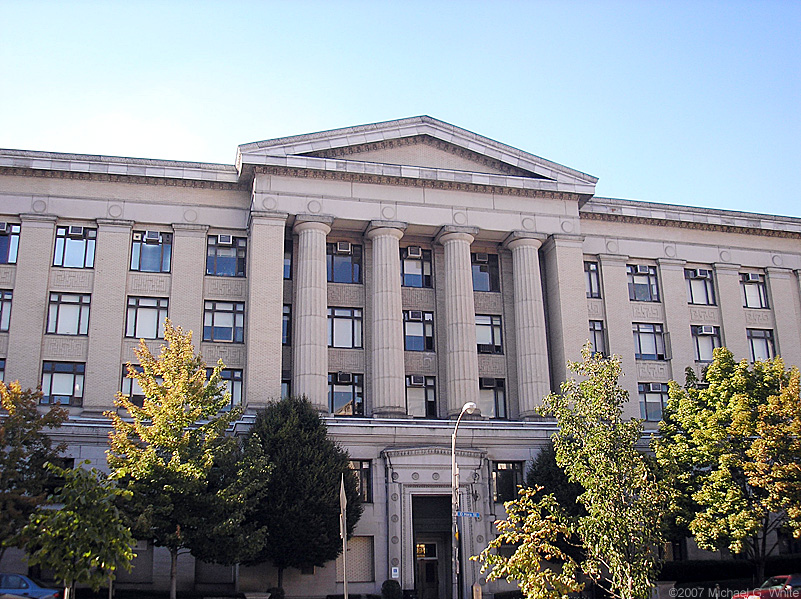
Former Mellon Institute building, now the University of Pittsburgh's Allen Hall

The former Ruskin Apartments, now the University of Pittsburgh's Ruskin Hall

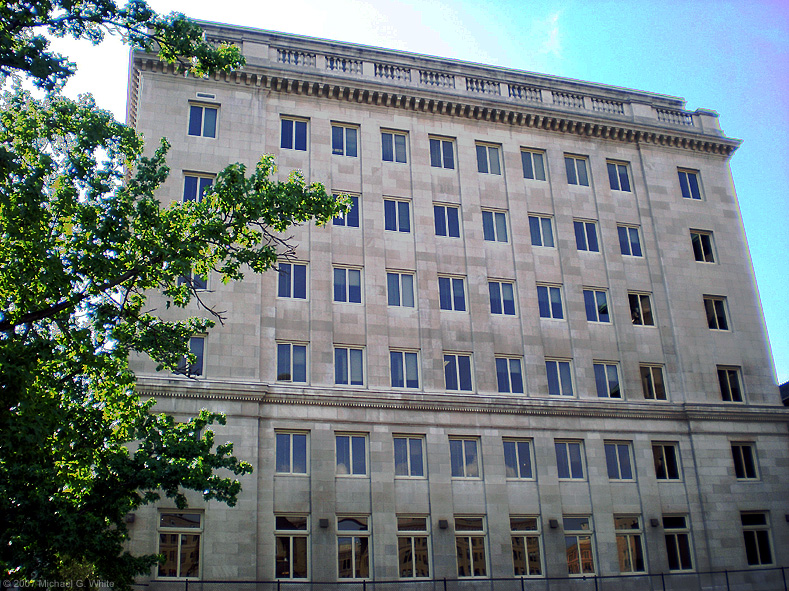
The former National Union Fire Insurance Company building, now the University of Pittsburgh's Thackeray Hall

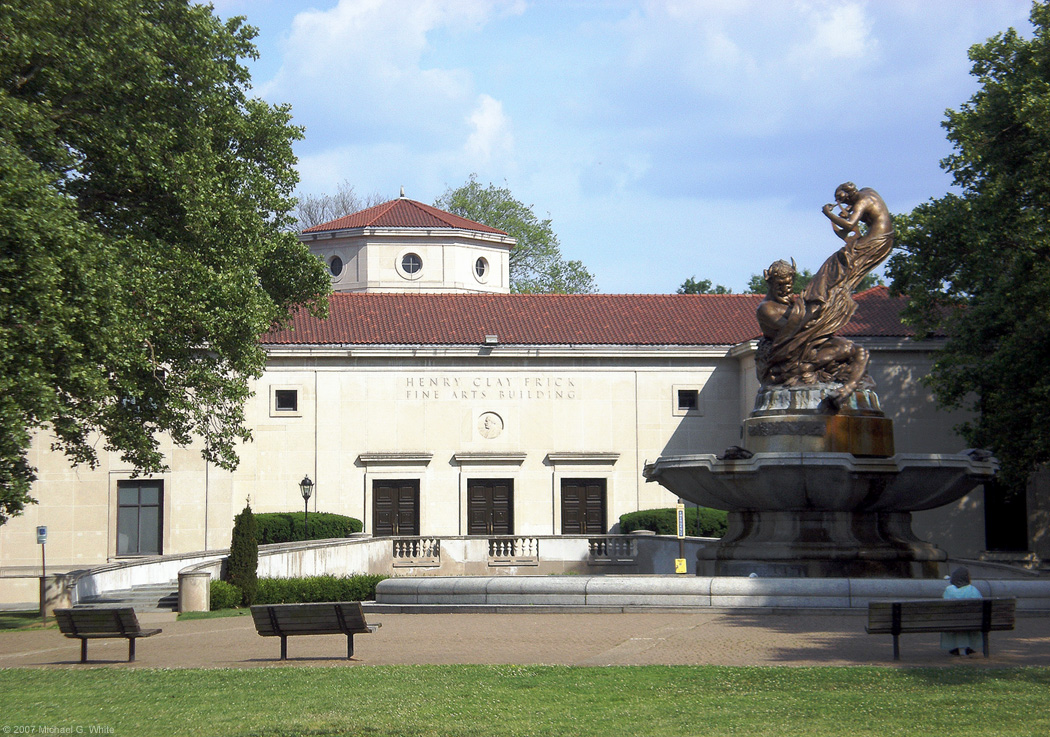
The Frick Fine Arts Building at the University of Pittsburgh

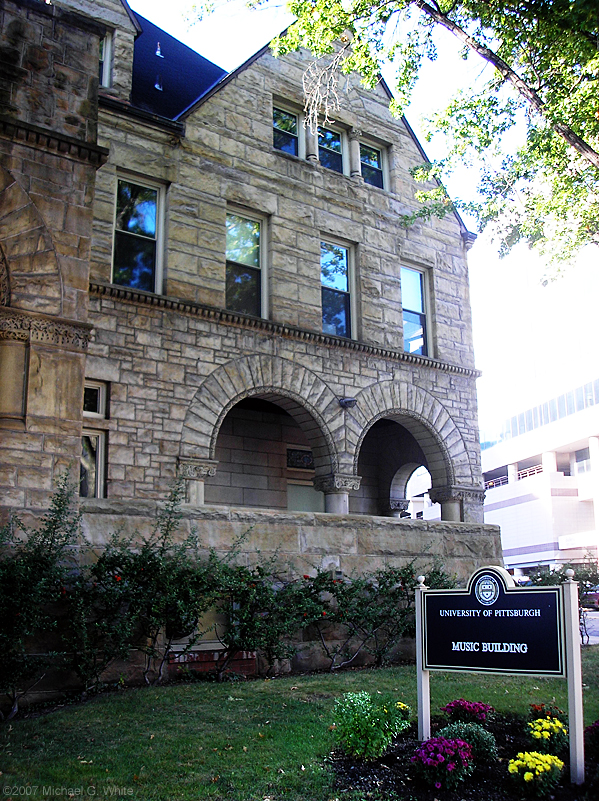
The former William Jacob Holland residence, now the Music Building at the University of Pittsburgh

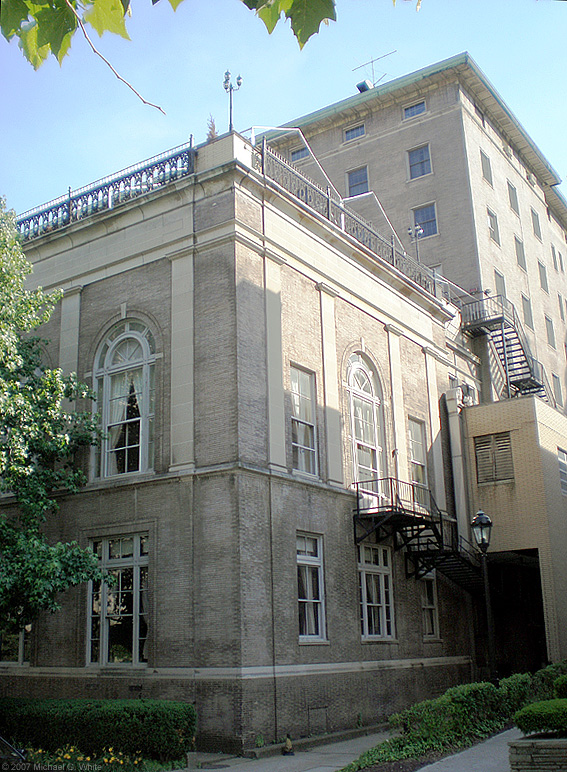
The University Club, now a building on Pitt's campus

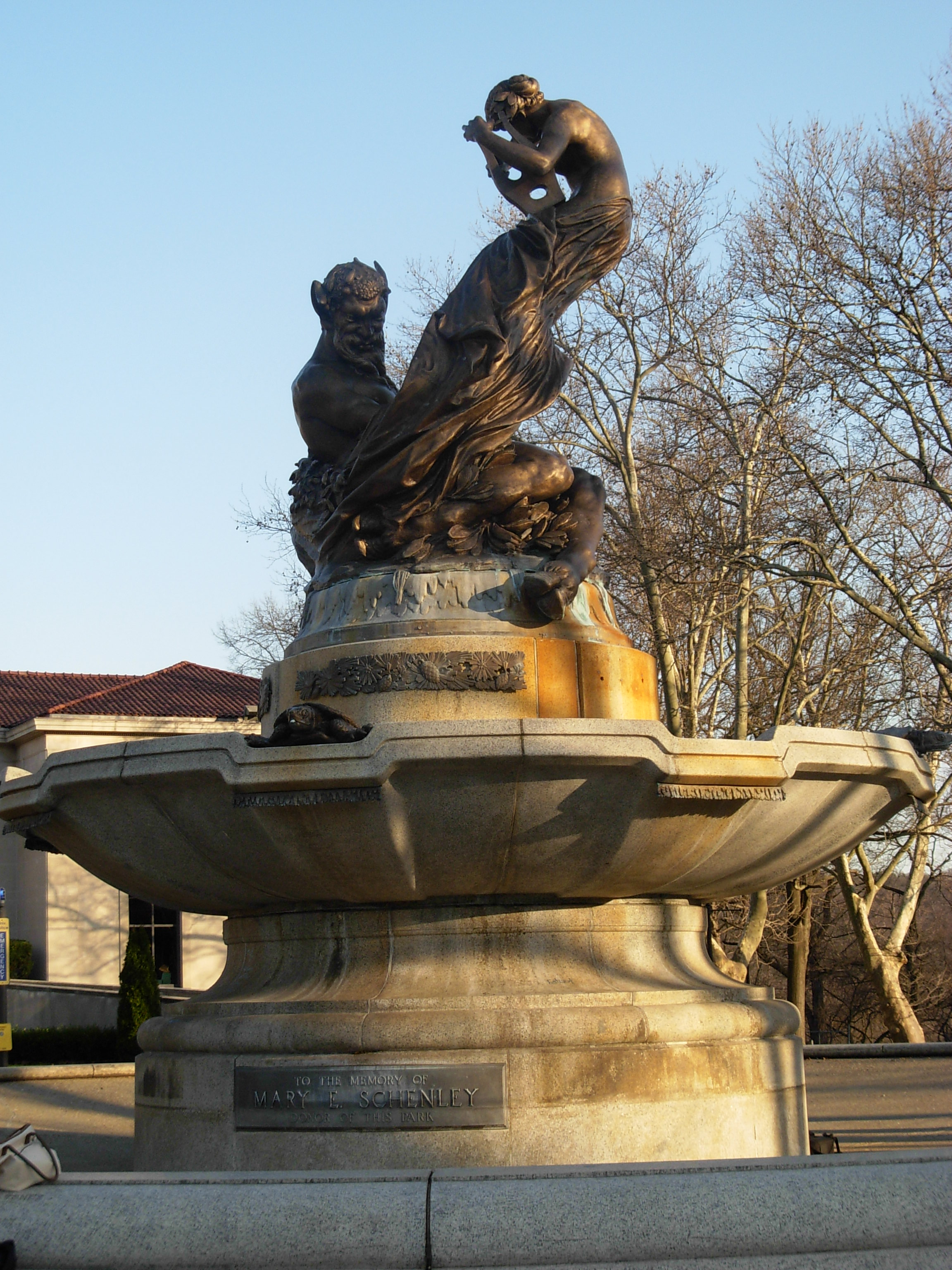
Mary Schenley Memorial Fountain (A Song to Nature)

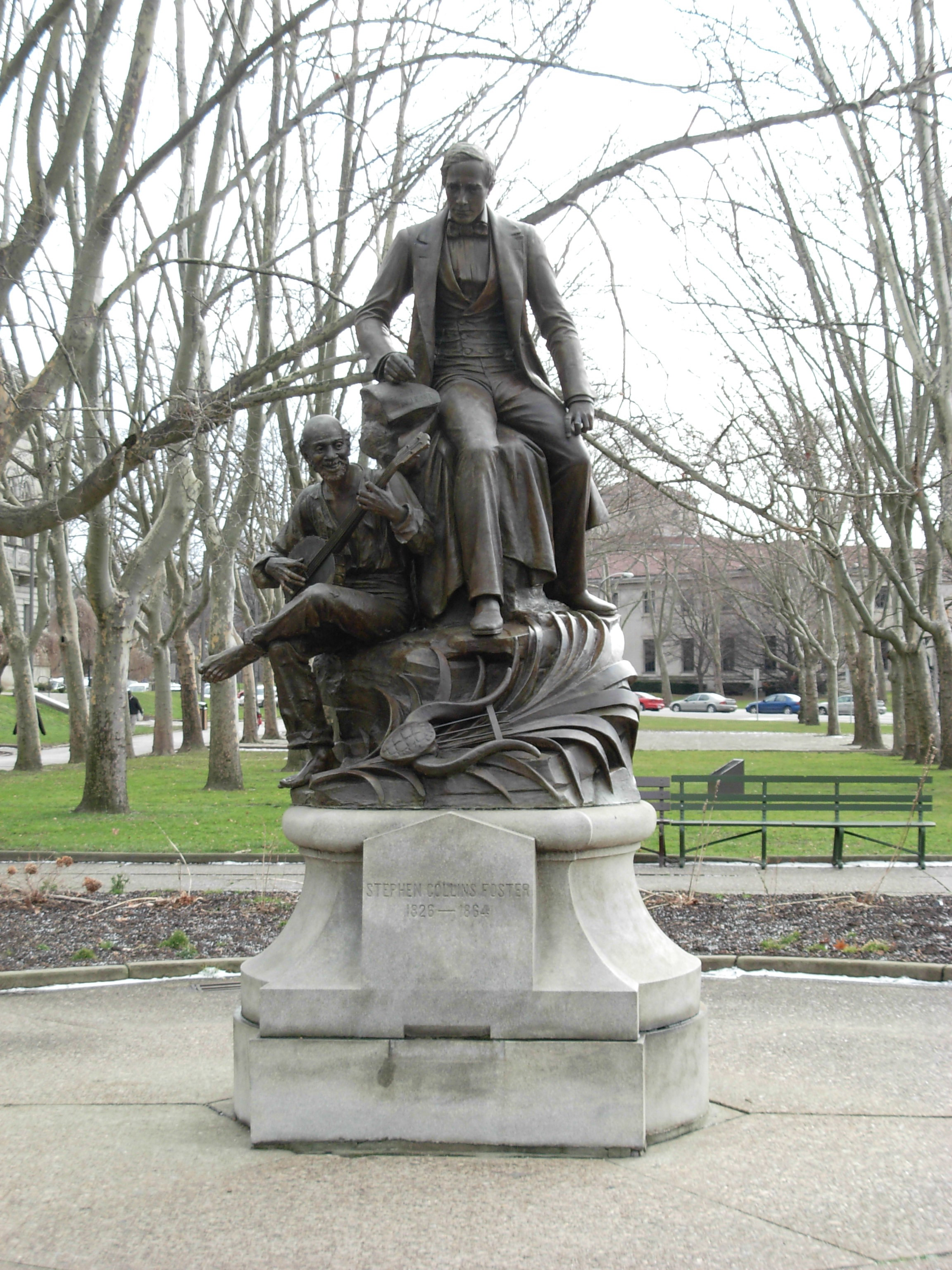
Stephen Foster (sculpture)

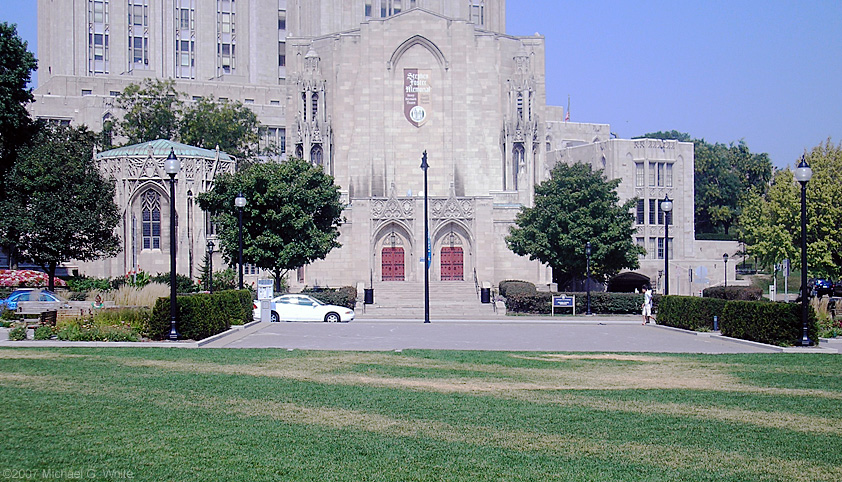
The Stephen Foster Memorial at the University of Pittsburgh

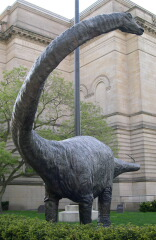
Dippy (sculpture)

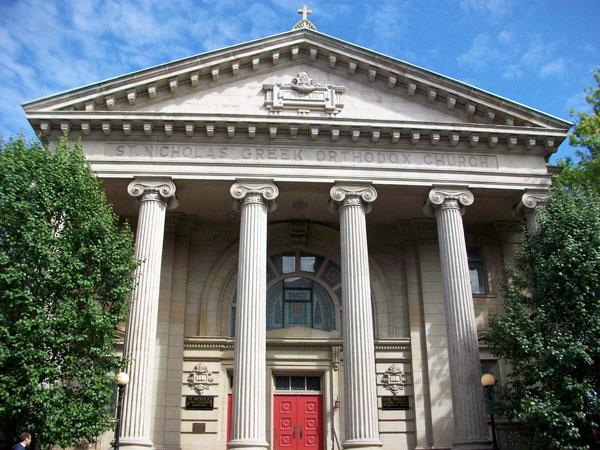
Saint Nicholas Greek Orthodox Cathedral

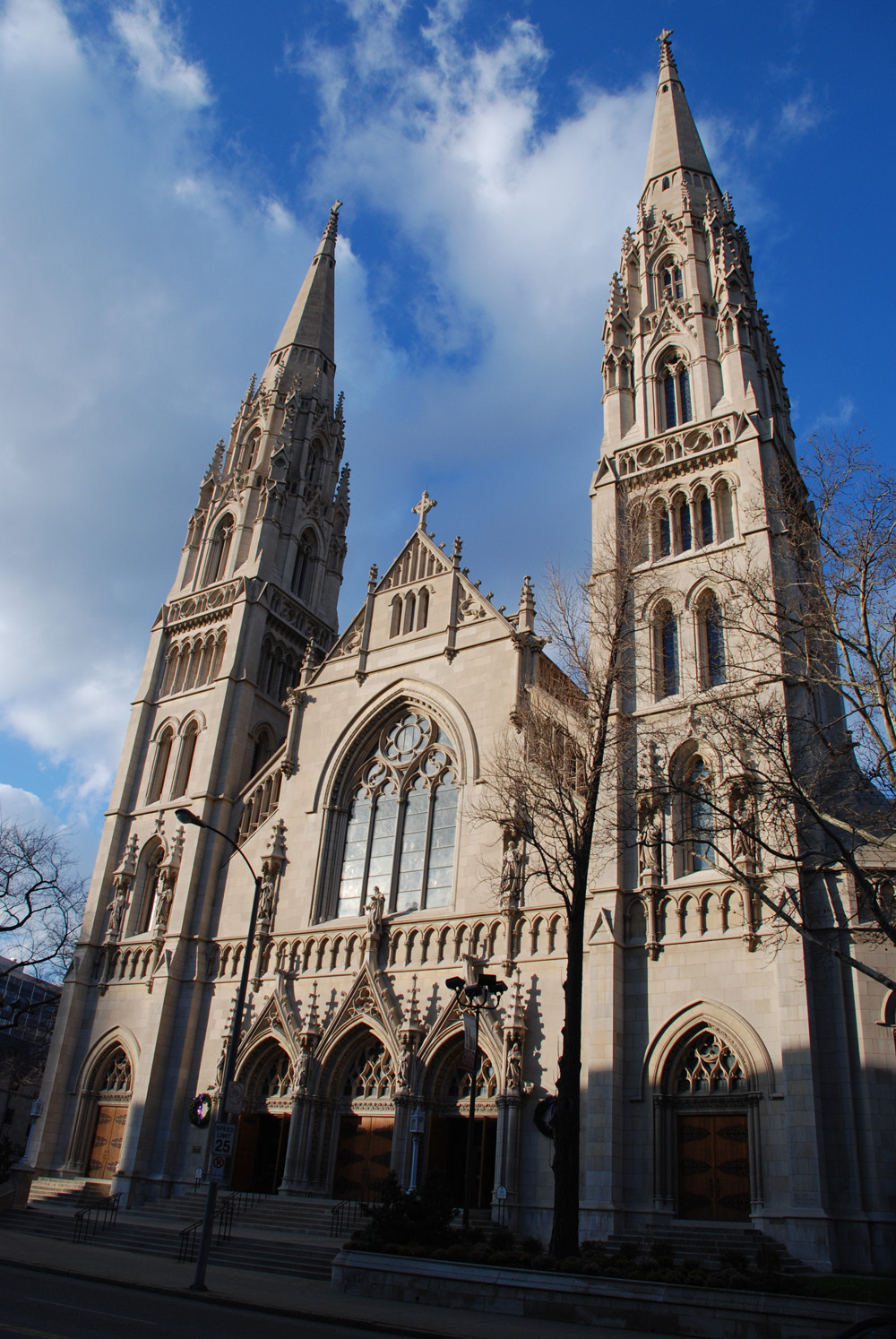
St. Paul's Cathedral

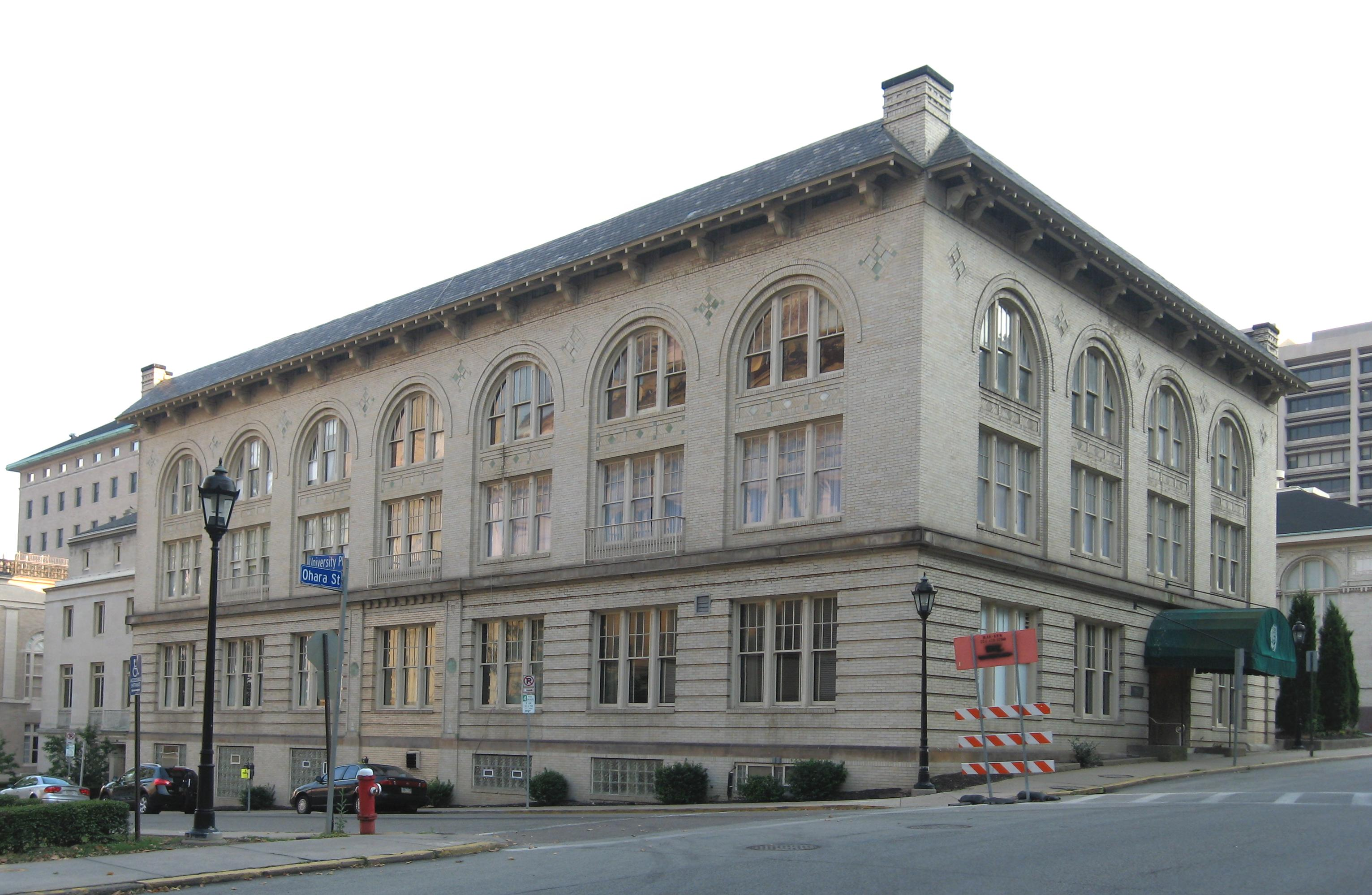
O'Hara Student Center

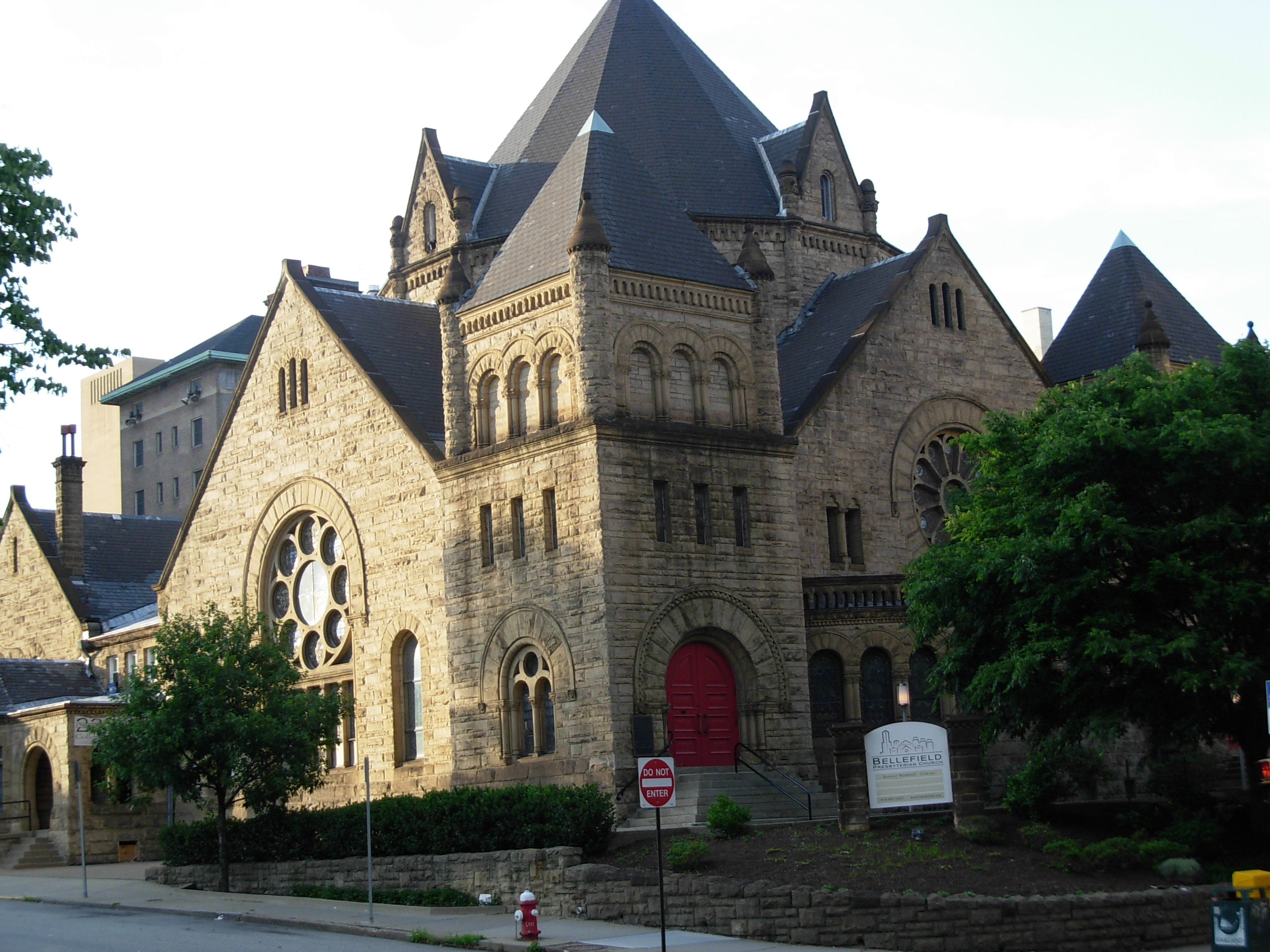
Bellefield Presbyterian Church

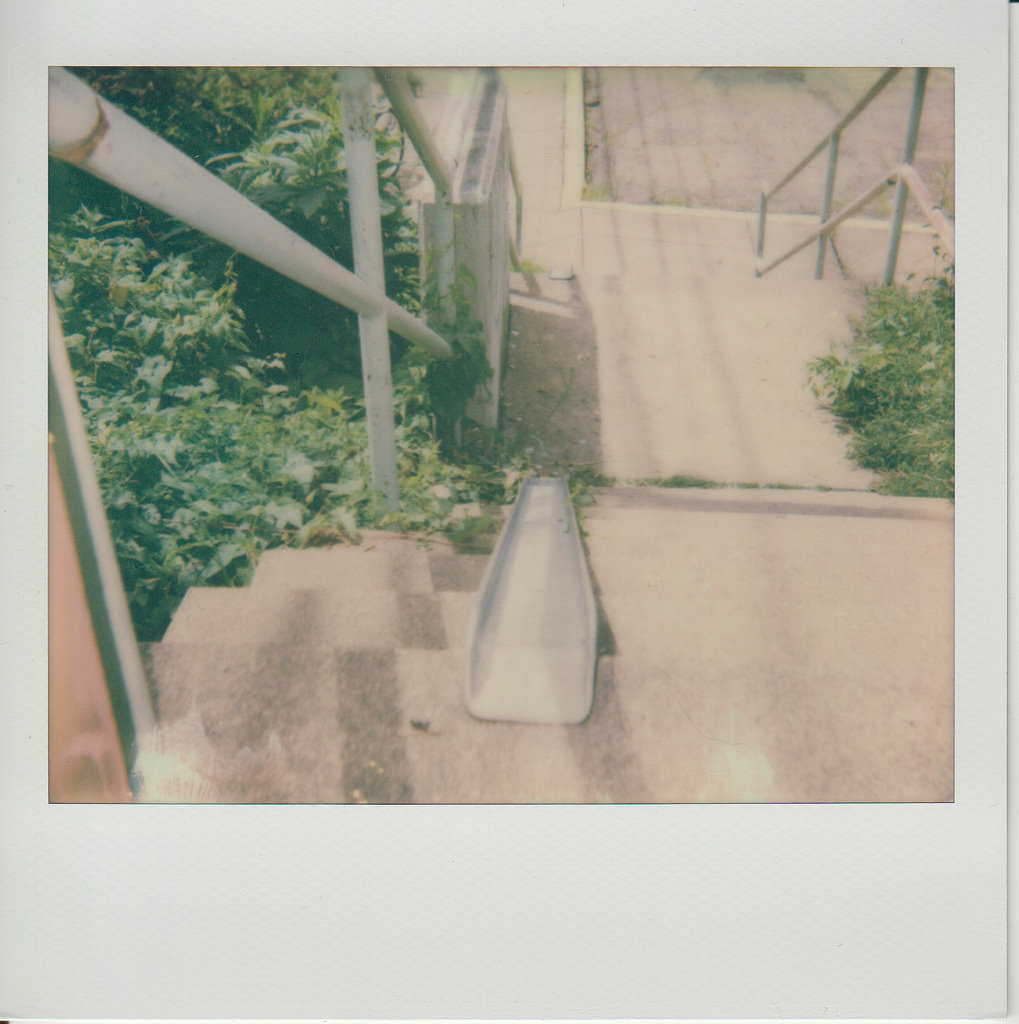
The Louisa Street city steps (with bike runnel) in West Oakland

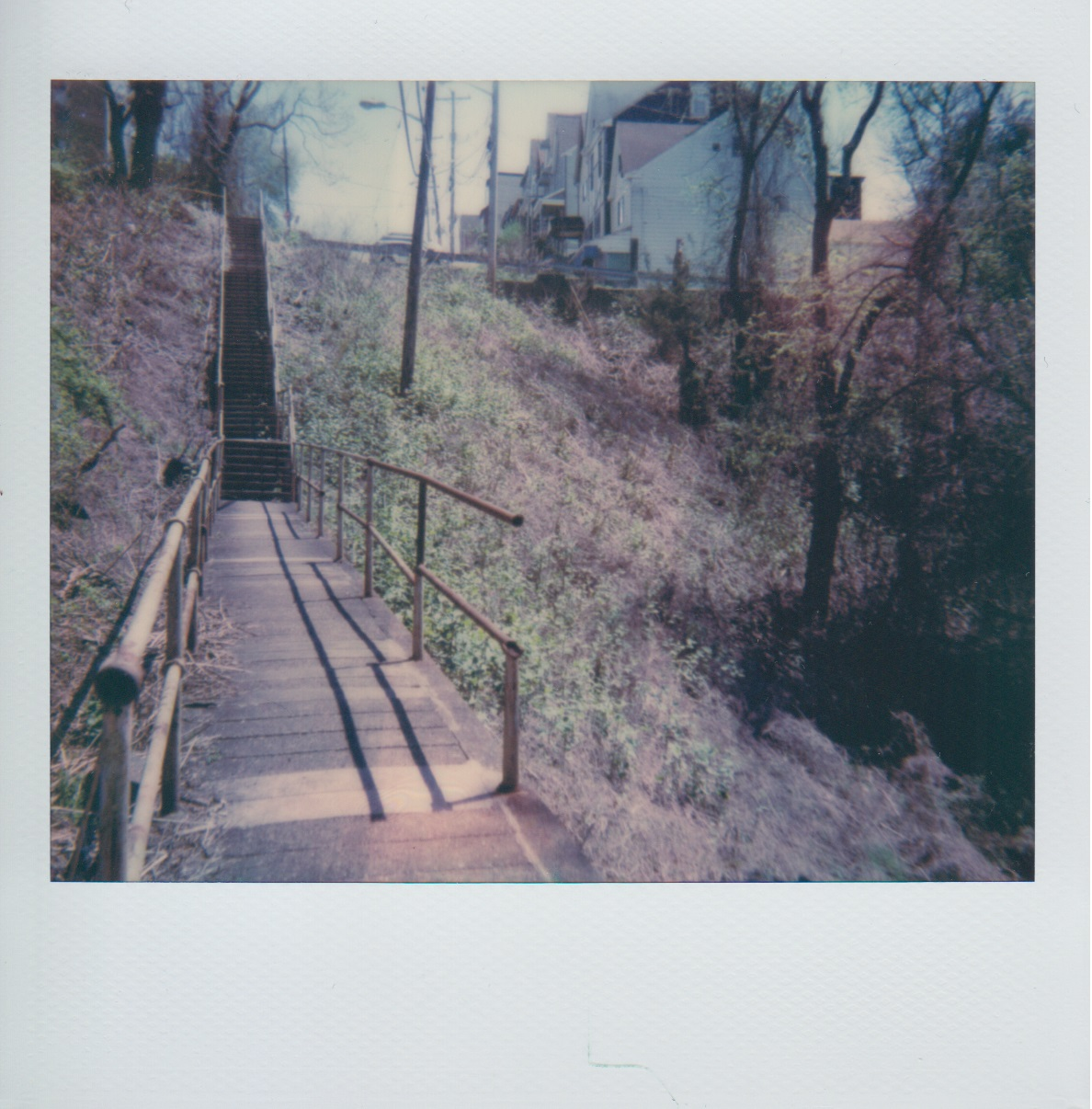
The Frazier Street city steps in South Oakland

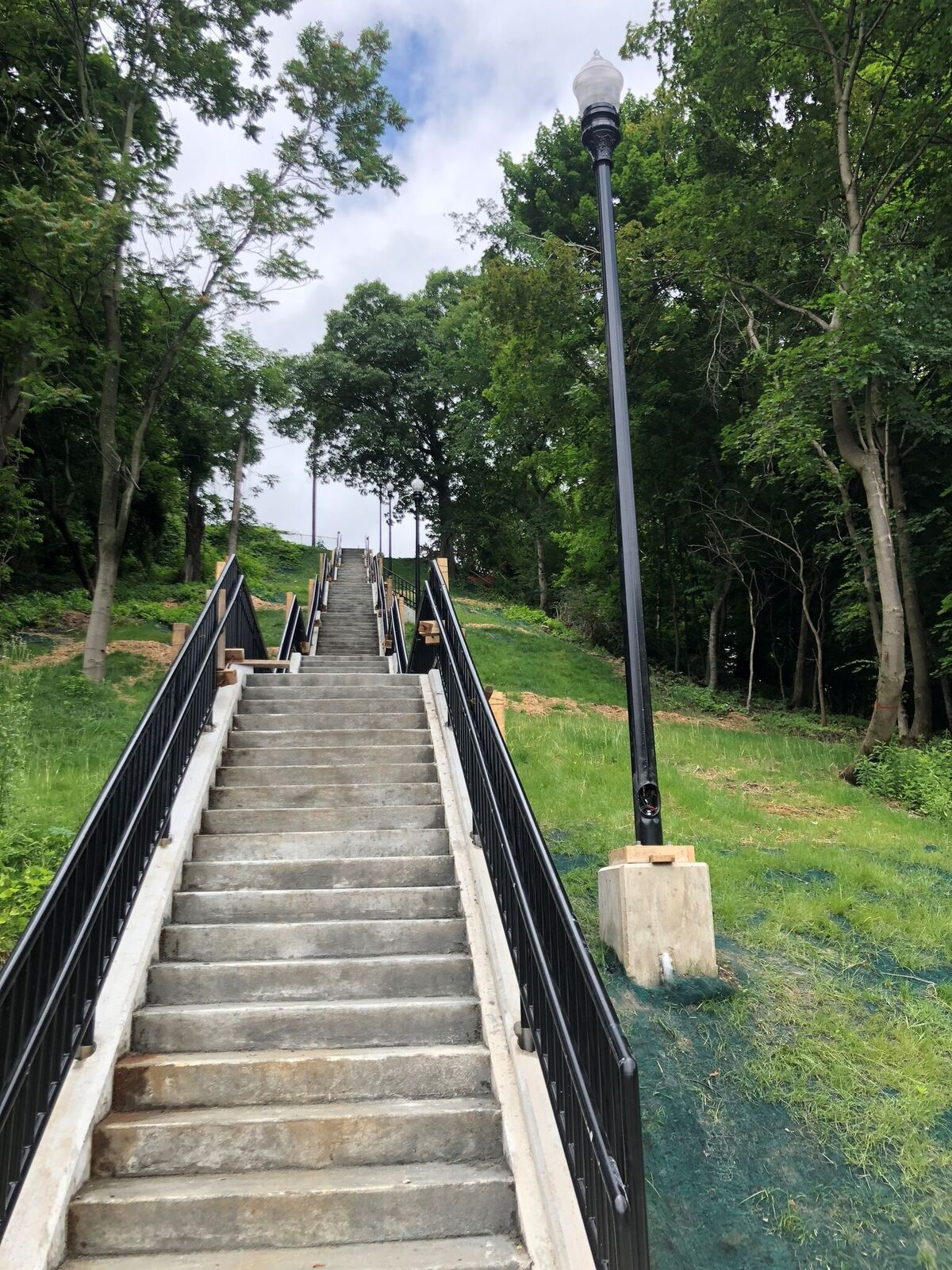
The refurbished Joncaire Street city steps (with bike runnel) in Central Oakland

== See also ==
- List of Pittsburgh neighborhoods
