= Longue Vue Club and Golf Course =

- U.S. National Register of Historic Places
- U.S. Historic district
- Pittsburgh Landmark – PHLF
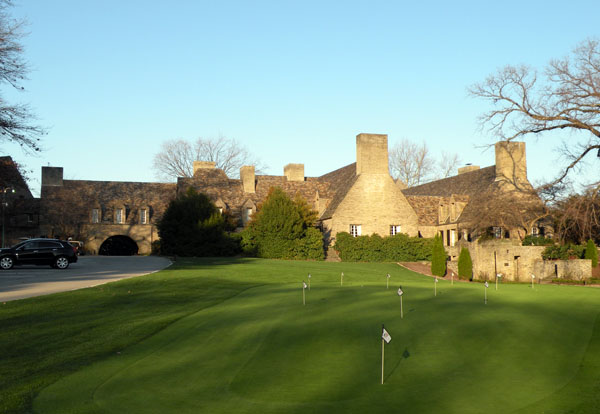
- Longue Vue Club and Golf Course in Verona, Pennsylvania

- Location within Pittsburgh Location within Pennsylvania Location within the United States
- Location: 400 Longue Vue Drive, Verona, Pennsylvania, U.S.
- Coordinates: 40°28′51.92″N 79°51′31.1″W
- Built: Longue Vue Club was founded in 1920. The clubhouse was completed in December 1923, in use by 1924, but not fully finished until 1925.
- Architect: Benno Janssen and William York Cocken (clubhouse architects), Edward A. Wehr (construction), Albert D. Taylor (landscape architect), Robert White (original course designer) with additions made in 1938 by A. W. Tillinghast. Over the years, Geoffrey Cornish and Ron Forse also contributed to the design of the course.
- Architectural style: Historically cited as English Cotswold or French Norman, neither is correct. The vernacular can only be called "Old World Style" with Benno Janssen's signature monumental chimneys.
- Website: longuevue.org
- NRHP reference No.: 05000414

Significant dates
- Added to NRHP: May 10, 2005
- Designated PHLF: 1985

Longue Vue Club and Golf Course is a historic golf course and clubhouse in Penn Hills Township, Pennsylvania, a suburb of Pittsburgh. It was founded in the 1920s. It was added to the List of Pittsburgh History and Landmarks Foundation Historic Landmarks in 1985, and the National Register of Historic Places on May 10, 2005.

== History ==
In 1920, Pittsburgh businessman Edward W. Mudge spoke with a group of his peers about wanting to establish a golf course of their own. These were men of power and great wealth, and among their ranks were Edward V. Babcock, mayor of Pittsburgh and president of Babcock Lumber Company; Ernest T. Weir, president of Weirton Steel Company; A.L. Humphrey, president of Westinghouse Air Brake Company; J. Morrison Hansen, president of Standard Steel Car Company; as well as 13 other corporate executives who enjoyed the game of golf, which was just beginning to sweep the country. They were also men of action, because one week later they acquired a farm and adjacent lots for $150,000. These 370 acres were dramatically sited atop the highest point in Penn Hills Township and commanded a sweeping panorama of the Allegheny River Valley. The founding fathers named it Longue Vue (French for "long view") Club. Legend has it that when Longue Vue couldn't meet expenses during the depression, the gents rolled dice or cut cards to see who would cover the shortfall that year. Not surprisingly, Longue Vue became known as "The Millionaires Club."

In addition to golf, the Longue Vue stables were erected in 1922, and equestrians trotted along six miles of bridle paths. While relatively short-lived, the club’s first recreational activity is memorialized by the riding saddle in Longue Vue’s crest.

== Course Design ==
=== Course Architect Robert White ===
The golf course at the Longue Vue Club was designed by a man who is sometimes forgotten, yet greatly recognized as being one of the forefathers of golf in America. Robert White, whom the Club still honors through a yearly golf event, was commissioned to build the golf course by Longue Vue’s Board of Governors in April 1922. Robert White was born in 1874 in St. Andrews, Scotland and immigrated to the United States in 1894. White began laying out courses from the time he arrived in the United States. In these years, it would typically only take him only one morning to walk the land and decide on nine tee and green locations.

In 1902, Robert White helped found the Illinois Professional Golf Association and was appointed their president. This society was only the second of its kind in the world, due to the fact that the British PGA was only founded in 1901. When the United States PGA was founded in 1916, White was elected its first president due to his close relationship to nearly a third of the pros in the United States, and he held the position until 1920.

White was the first to use agronomic methods to maintain grass, which was essential to the success of the golf in the United States due to the drastic differences in terrain and weather patterns cross-country. A true pioneer, Robert White was the first to build a putting green on the White House lawn, one of the first designers and manufacturers of golf clubs in America, designer and builder of over 100 golf courses, and responsible for bringing golf to the Grand Strand in Myrtle Beach, South Carolina.

=== A.W. Tillinghast ===
Prolific golf architect Albert Warren Tillinghast renovated the course in 1935, making several recommendations to improve on the original layout. Tillinghast's contributions left a lasting mark, and truly made Longue Vue’s course what it is today. He is often remembered as the first designer who consciously set out to create golf holes that were visually attractive, helping to transform golf course architecture from its roots in nature to a greater art form. Tillinghast drew on the principles of landscape design, engineering and art to transform a property into a spectacular playing field. During the torpor of the Great Depression, Tillinghast offered to help clubs such as Longue Vue economize on their maintenance. His suggestions can be noted in a letter that was sent by him to the PGA President on October 18, 1935. The following excerpt is from that letter:

“As directed by your telegram, I left here on the afternoon of the 15th by train, arriving at New Haven the next morning. On the morning of the 15th, at the request of P.G.A member Will McKay, I inspected the course at Longue Vue (note corrected spelling of previous report) Club at Pittsburgh. I was accompanied by McKay, J.H. Baily (Chairman of the Green Committee) and W.H. Key (Greenskeeper). Their chief problem has been the first hole with a blind drive to a side hill fairway. I gave them full instructions for a rather extensive grading operation, which they requested. Their next problem centered about the 10th and 11th holes, where a stiff climb to the former was most objectionable. I corrected this with a new site for the 9th green (a better one than originally) a new green for the shortened tenth and a new teeing ground for a shortened eleventh. In this manner the hill climb is eliminated completely.”

== Clubhouse Architects ==
=== Benno Janssen ===
The founders commissioned renowned architect Benno Janssen to design a clubhouse with the old world charm of an English Country estate. Janssen’s trademark style is evident throughout the clubhouse with his use of multiple high-pitched gables, slate roof, large groupings of rectangular windows, unusually wide chimneys, and intricately carved stone detail. He designed Longue Vue to have a 1:1 ratio of indoor to outdoor space by providing spacious terraces around the circumference of the building.

Janssen’s work can be found throughout the Pittsburgh area, both commercially and residentially. His work includes the William Penn Hotel, the Mellon Institute, the Pittsburgh Athletic Association, and Rolling Rock Club. Janssen is also renowned for more than three dozen homes in the Pittsburgh area, including La Tourelle and the Ingersoll House, both in Fox Chapel.

Benno Janssen was born in 1874 in St. Louis, Missouri. He studied architecture at the University of Kansas, the Massachusetts Institute of Technology, and the Ecole des Beaux Arts in Paris, France. Settling in Pittsburgh in 1905, he eventually partnered with William York Cockren, the firm that was commissioned to prepare the plans for Longue Vue’s clubhouse. The building became in use in 1924.

Janssen’s design was based upon the English Norman vernacular. Architectural historian James D. Van Trump notes Janssen’s “easy and clever handling of the picturesque, vernacular forms of the English Country house school of the early 20th century. Here we have the manner of the Surrey houses of Lutyens adapted to the requirements of the 20th century America. This adaptation is apparent in the arched automobile portals.”

The Longue Vue Club has honored Benno Janssen through the naming of its informal dining room, “The Janssen Room.”

Longue Vue’s Clubhouse was designated as a National Historic District in 2006.

== The Inaugural Round ==
The first official round of golf was played at Longue Vue in May 1923. Although very little information is known regarding the teams, scores, or winners, the players were a very interesting bunch.

The first of these players was Glenna Collett Vare. Mrs. Vare was a six time U.S. Women’s Amateur Champion between 1922 and 1935. She was known for her strength and even had drives measured to be over 300 yards long. She is also known for the role she played in originating the Curtis Cup, a professional women’s golf tournament where the United States plays against Great Britain and Ireland, as well as for her participation as a player-captain for several years.

Ms. Edith Cummings was also a player in the club’s inaugural round. She was the first female athlete to appear on the cover of TIME Magazine, and was featured on the issue of August 25, 1924. She was given this honor less than one year after winning the 1923 U.S. Women’s Amateur Championships. A fascinating fact about Edith Cummings is that the character Jordan, in F. Scott Fitzgerald's The Great Gatsby, was based solely off of her.

The third player in the match was Mr. “Jock” Hutchinson. In his golf career, Mr. Hutchinson was won two major events, the 1920 PGA Championship and the 1921 Open Championship at St. Andrew’s. Coincidentally, he was born in St. Andrews, Scotland, but he left home and became a U.S. citizen. This made him the first U.S.-based player to win an event of this magnitude. Mr. Hutchinson also won the inaugural PGA Seniors’ Championship in 1937 at Augusta National Golf Club and won the event a second time in 1947.

The fourth and final player to play in the inaugural round at Longue Vue was Mr. Joseph Kirkwood. Mr. Kirkwood was a professional player and one of the most prominent trick shot golfers of the time.
