= Alumni Hall (University of Pittsburgh) =

- U.S. Historic district – Contributing property
- Pittsburgh Landmark – PHLF
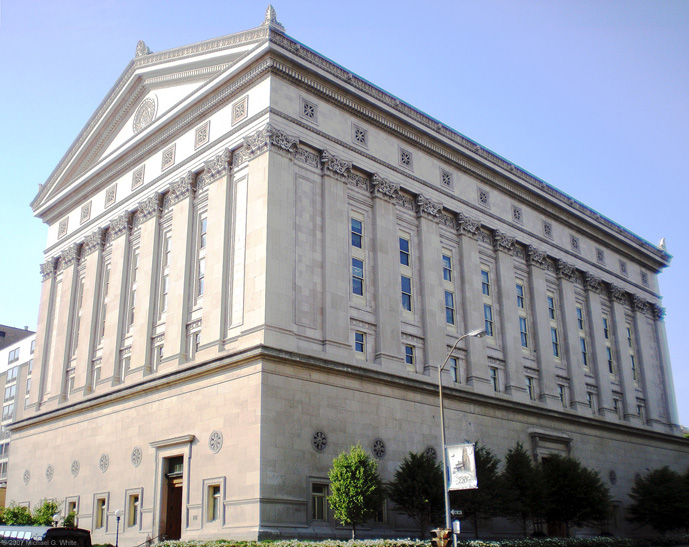
- Alumni Hall at the University of Pittsburgh
- Location: Fifth and Lytton Avenues; Pittsburgh, Pennsylvania, USA
- Coordinates: 40°26′44.09″N 79°57′13.90″W
- Built: 1914–1915
- Architect: Benno Janssen
- Architectural style: Greek Revival
- Part of: Schenley Farms Historic District (ID83002213)

Significant dates
- Added to NRHP: July 22, 1983
- Designated PHLF: 2002

Alumni Hall at the University of Pittsburgh is a Pittsburgh History and Landmarks Foundation Historic Landmark that was formerly known as the Masonic Temple in Pittsburgh. Constructed in 1914–1915, it was designed by renowned architect Benno Janssen of Janssen & Abbot Architects. Other buildings in Pittsburgh's Oakland Cultural District designed by Janssen include the Pittsburgh Athletic Association, Mellon Institute, and Pitt's Eberly Hall (which was known as Alumni Hall prior to 1998).

The building's design is that of a classical temple with a well-defined base, midsection and ornamental terra cotta pediment, topped with a clay tile roof. The structure is steel, clad primarily in limestone with terra cotta details. The rear elevation is brick.

== Dimensions ==
Alumni Hall spans 200 feet (61 m) along Fifth Avenue on Pitt's campus and runs 120 feet (37 m) deep. It is nine stories high with two-story spaces throughout, has 98,000 square feet (9,100 m^{2}) of functional space as well as an additional 12,000 square feet (1,100 m^{2}) accommodating entrances, corridors, stairwells, and elevators. There are three main entrances on Fifth, Lytton, and Tennyson Avenues.

== Restoration and renovation ==
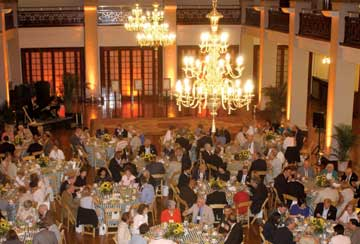
The Connolly Ballroom on the first floor of Alumni Hall plays host to various university functions.

The University of Pittsburgh acquired the former Masonic Temple on December 23, 1993, for $8.5 million ($18.9 million in 2025 dollars). A two-year, $16 million ($30.9 million in 2025 dollars) renovation of the structure and its adaptation for use by the University departments began in November 1998 and was completed in February 2000. During the initial design process, a study was performed to evaluate the architectural and historic significance of each major area of the building. As a result, four main lobbies, the ballroom and three main entrances, and portions of several two-story spaces on the third and fifth floors were kept and restored. Special attention was given to restore the Masonic Temple's original historic condition. As such, approximately 95% of the existing historical light fixtures were rewired, retrofitted with energy–efficient lamps, refinished, and rehung in their original locations. Nearly all of the original wood doors, window casings and baseboards were refinished and reinstalled. Five new automatic elevators were installed and original bronze and stainless steel cabs were retrofitted to two of the new elevator platforms. Approximately 100 original bronze door hardware sets were modified to ADA compliance, refinished and reinstalled. One thousand square feet of marble flooring originally from Pennsylvania Hall (the previous home of Pitt's medical school since torn down) was utilized in vestibules, corridors, elevator lobbies and cabs. Marble from the Masonic Temple's original marble restroom stalls was also recycled for use in these areas. The building was decorated and furnished in a color scheme of primarily blues, mauves and burgundy to complement the mahogany woodwork.

Renovations included replacement of the building's electrical, mechanical and plumbing systems and the addition of air conditioning. A wheelchair-accessible entrance was added at Tennyson Avenue and the entire building was brought up to ADA guidelines. Modern emergency fire and electrical systems were added as well as conduits for wiring installations for data and power for 380 of the building's classroom seats.

== Uses of Alumni Hall ==
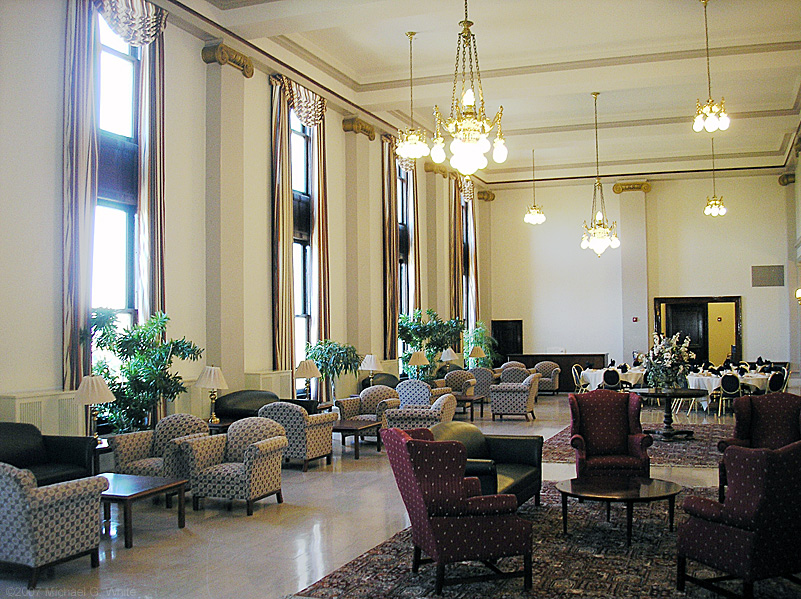
Katz School of Business's Mellon Financial Corporation Hall located on the fifth floor.

Originally an event center and meeting facility for area Masons, Alumni Hall now houses Pitt's Alumni Relations offices and Alumni Center, the Office of Admissions and Financial Aid, the headquarters of the Pitt Pathfinders, a 270-seat Natural Science Lecture Hall, the Office of Governmental Relations, the Institute of Politics, the University Center for Teaching and Learning, and the University of Pittsburgh Katz School of Business's Mellon Financial Corporation Hall that houses the Center for Executive Education. The lobby of Alumni Hall is also the home to Pitt's Legacy Gallery. On the first floor, Alumni Hall also features the Connolly Ballroom that seats 400 for dinner or 500 theater-style. The ballroom balcony contains a portrait gallery of former Pitt chancellors. The seventh-floor auditorium lobby/reception area houses the collection of oil paintings, "365 Views of the Cathedral of Learning", completed in 1997–1999 by renowned Spanish artist Felix de la Concha. Each painting features the Cathedral of Learning from a different vantage point for each of 365 days. For many years, the auditorium on the seventh floor served as the primary venue for the Kuntu Repertory Theatre. The building also contains various study areas.

== Ghost legend ==
A legend dating to the building's use as a Masonic temple tells of a ghost resembling a distinguished-looking gentleman dressed in a black tuxedo, perhaps an old, lost Mason, that sometimes appears to wander the corridors and stairwells of the building.

== Gallery ==
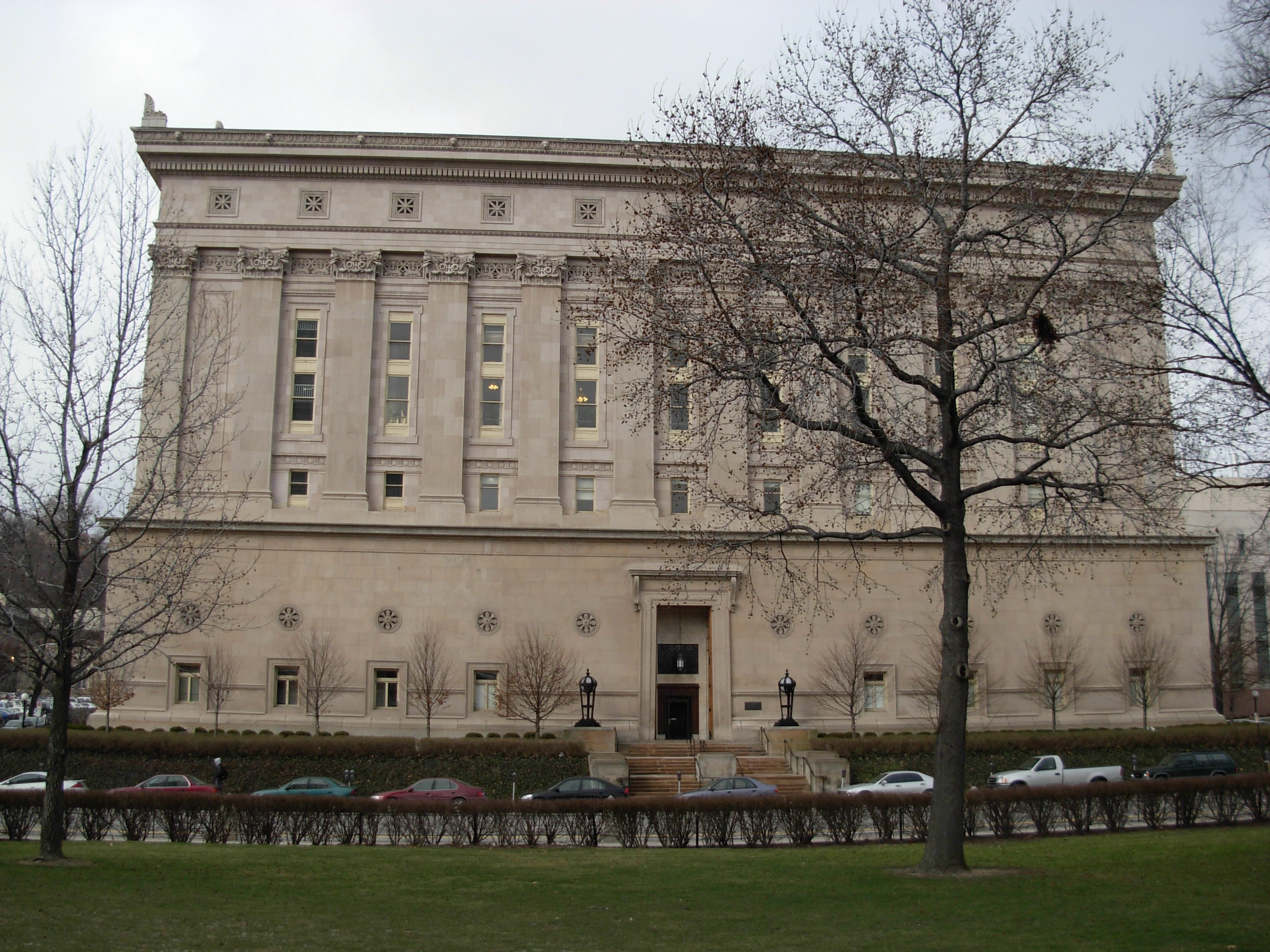
Alumni Hall

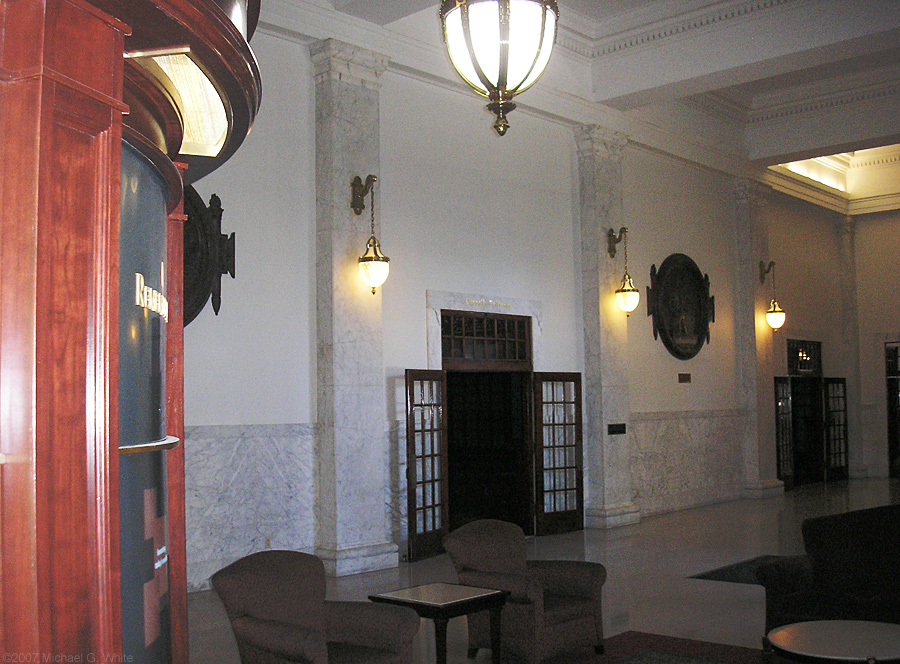
Legacy Gallery in lobby

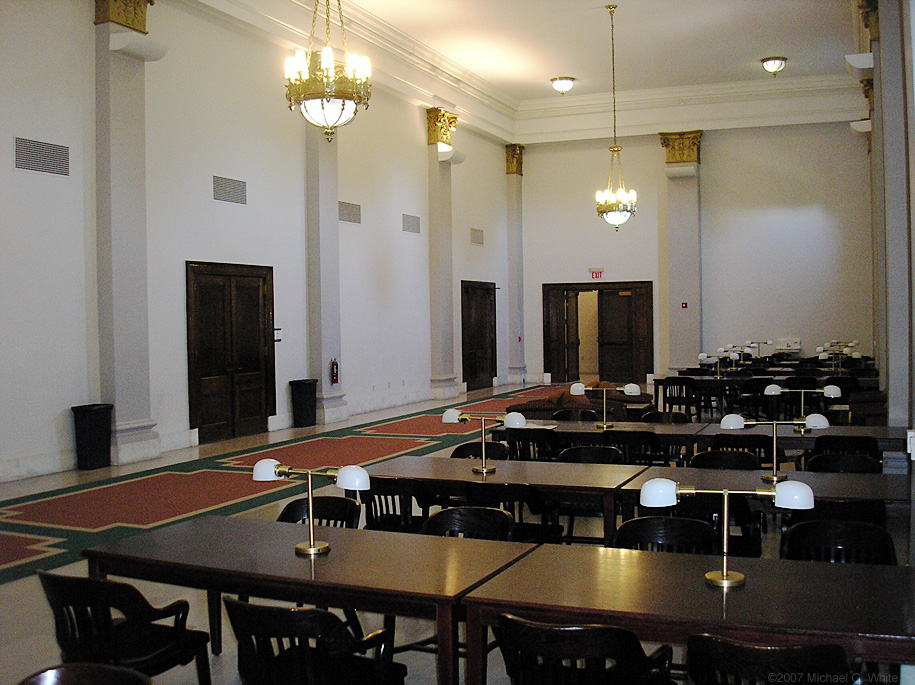
A study area in Alumni Hall

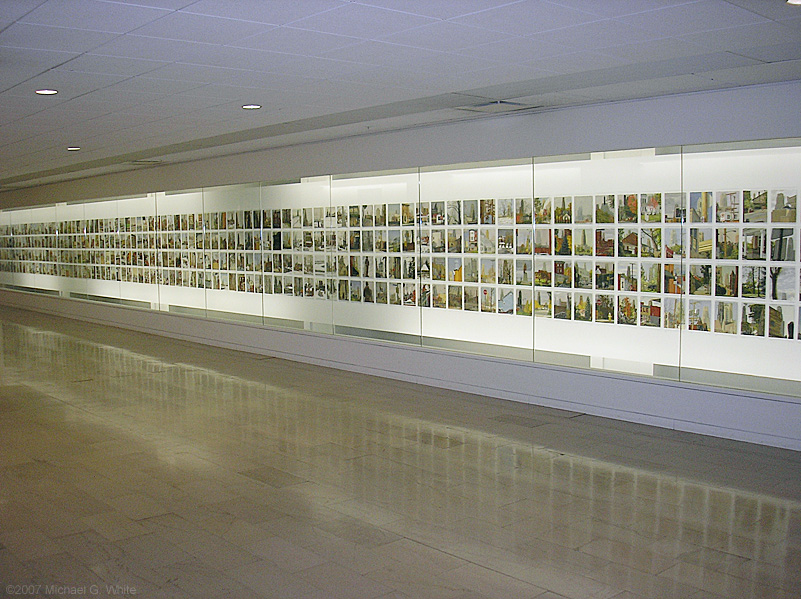
“365 Views of the Cathedral of Learning,” by Felix de la Concha

Preceded by Allen Hall	University of Pittsburgh buildings Alumni Hall; Constructed: 1914–1915	Succeeded by Eberly Hall
