= George Curme =

George Curme may refer to:

- George Oliver Curme (1860–1948), American linguist
- George O. Curme Jr. (1888–1976), his son, American industrial chemist
