= Eberly Hall =

Academic building in Pittsburgh, Pennsylvania, U.S.

Coordinates: 40°26′45″N 79°57′30″W

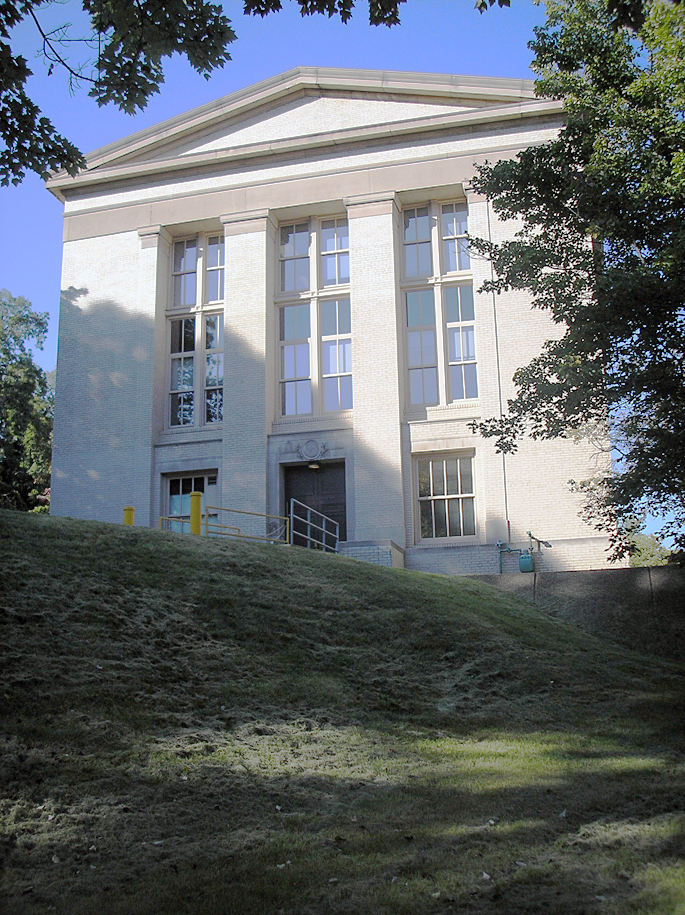
Eberly Hall, originally named Alumni Hall, at the University of Pittsburgh.

Eberly Hall is an academic building on the campus of the University of Pittsburgh in Pittsburgh, Pennsylvania, United States. Designed by architect Benno Janssen and dedicated in 1921, Eberly Hall was originally named Alumni Hall, and is still sometimes referred to as "Old Alumni Hall" (Alumni Hall is now the name of another university building).

== History ==
When the United States entered World War I in 1917, by law of Congress, all male college students were subject to military training. In the spring of 1918, Pitt began to train students for war-related industrial work. The war activity had caused a huge influx of students to Pitt and an equally large shortage of space. Pitt alumni began a fund raising campaign to construct a sorely needed new building. The campaign was deemed a smashing success in that it raised $670,000 ($10.5 million in 2024 dollars), at the time $70,000 more than was needed due at least in part to both the excitement of alumni with the championship caliber play of the Pitt football team (national champions or undefeated in 1910, 1915, 1916, 1917, 1918 and 1920), a $100,000 ($1.57 million in 2024 dollars) contribution directly from the Athletic Committee's football receipts, and profits from the productions of the student theatre's Cap and Gown Club. During construction which started in January 1920, it was discovered that the hillside was undercut with coal mines, some of which were on fire and emitting smoke upon digging. The mines were filled as construction progressed with the last fire being extinguished about a year after Eberly Hall was completed. By 1921 Eberly Hall (then called Alumni Hall), was dedicated and signified a departure from and end to the original design for the university's campus, a hill side Acropolis Plan by Henry Hornbostel. Ironically, Eberly Hall's architect, Benno Janssen, was the runner-up to Hornbostel in a national architectural competition for the design of the original campus plan.

Eberly Hall received its current name on September 11, 1998 in recognition of the Eberly family's long-term support of the university. The Eberly Family Foundation and the Eberly Family Charitable Trust, have supported student scholarships, the Shakespeare-in-the-Schools program, and a chaired professorship in biotechnology. Their most recent gift will be used in conjunction with state funds to renovate Eberly Hall to support teaching and research activities of the chemistry department. Among the participants at the building rededication were Robert E. Eberly, his sister Carolyn Blaney, and Robert E. Eberly III.

== Usage ==
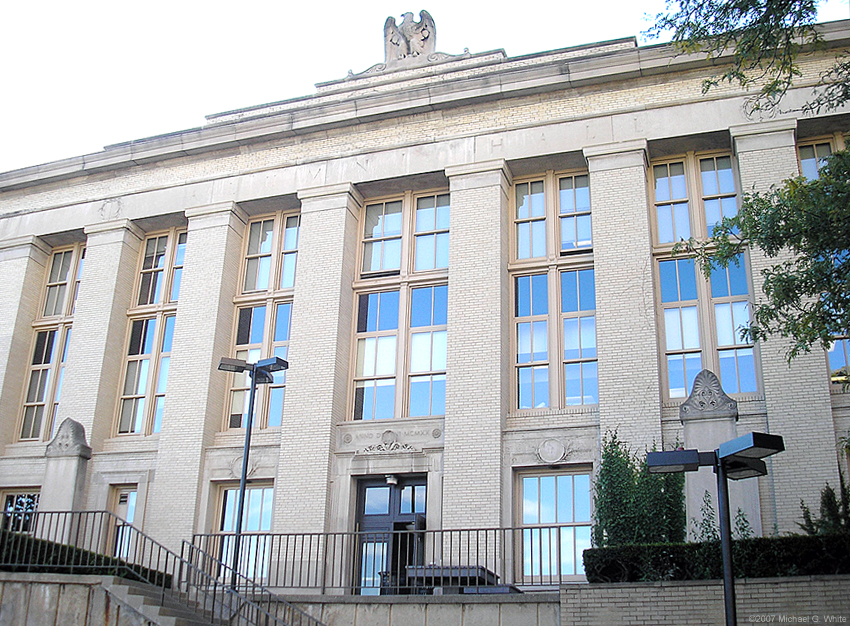
The front of entrance of Eberly Hall.

Eberly Hall has served many university departments throughout its history. It housed the Department of Chemistry after being remodeled in 1937, and by 1941, the entire department was housed there until it was moved into Chevron Science Center which sits directly in front of it. Eberly Hall still houses the Chemistry library at Pitt. The hall also housed the Department of Psychology until 1946 , and housed the Department of Computer Science until 2002, when the department was moved into Sennott Square. That year, Eberly Hall underwent a $1.5 million renovation to house Pitt's Center for Molecular Materials Simulations and support services from Chevron Science Center. In 2010–11, $3.4 million in renovations are scheduled for its Chemistry Electronics Shop and its Nanoscience Laboratory in order to create new synthetic and spectroscopy laboratory suites. Currently, Eberly Hall houses the memorial room for chemist Alexander Lowy. The memorial previously resided in Clapp Hall, but has since been relocated.

Preceded by Alumni Hall	University of Pittsburgh buildings Eberly Hall; Constructed: 1920-1921	Succeeded by Ruskin Hall
