= George J. Schmitt House =

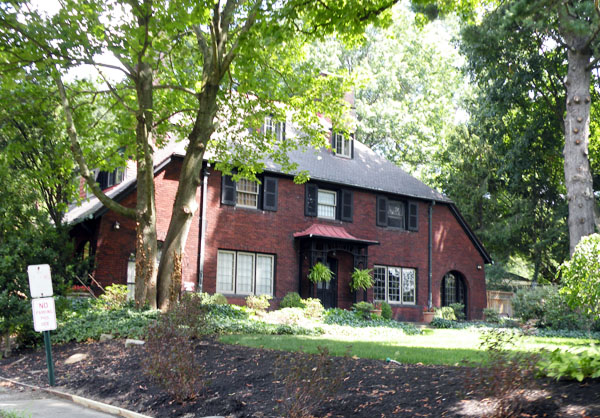

- Location of 7120 Ohio River Boulevard in Allegheny County, Pennsylvania
- 40°30′19.01″N 80°5′3.03″W
- Location: 7120 Ohio River Boulevard, Ben Avon, Allegheny County, Pennsylvania, USA

History
- Built: 1916

Site notes
- Architect(s): Janssen & Abbott

Pittsburgh Landmark – PHLF
- Designated: 2003

George J. Schmitt House located at 7120 Ohio River Boulevard in Ben Avon, Allegheny County, Pennsylvania, was built in 1916. The house, designed by Janssen & Abbott, was added to the List of Pittsburgh History and Landmarks Foundation Historic Landmarks in 2003.
