= Norman Duncan =

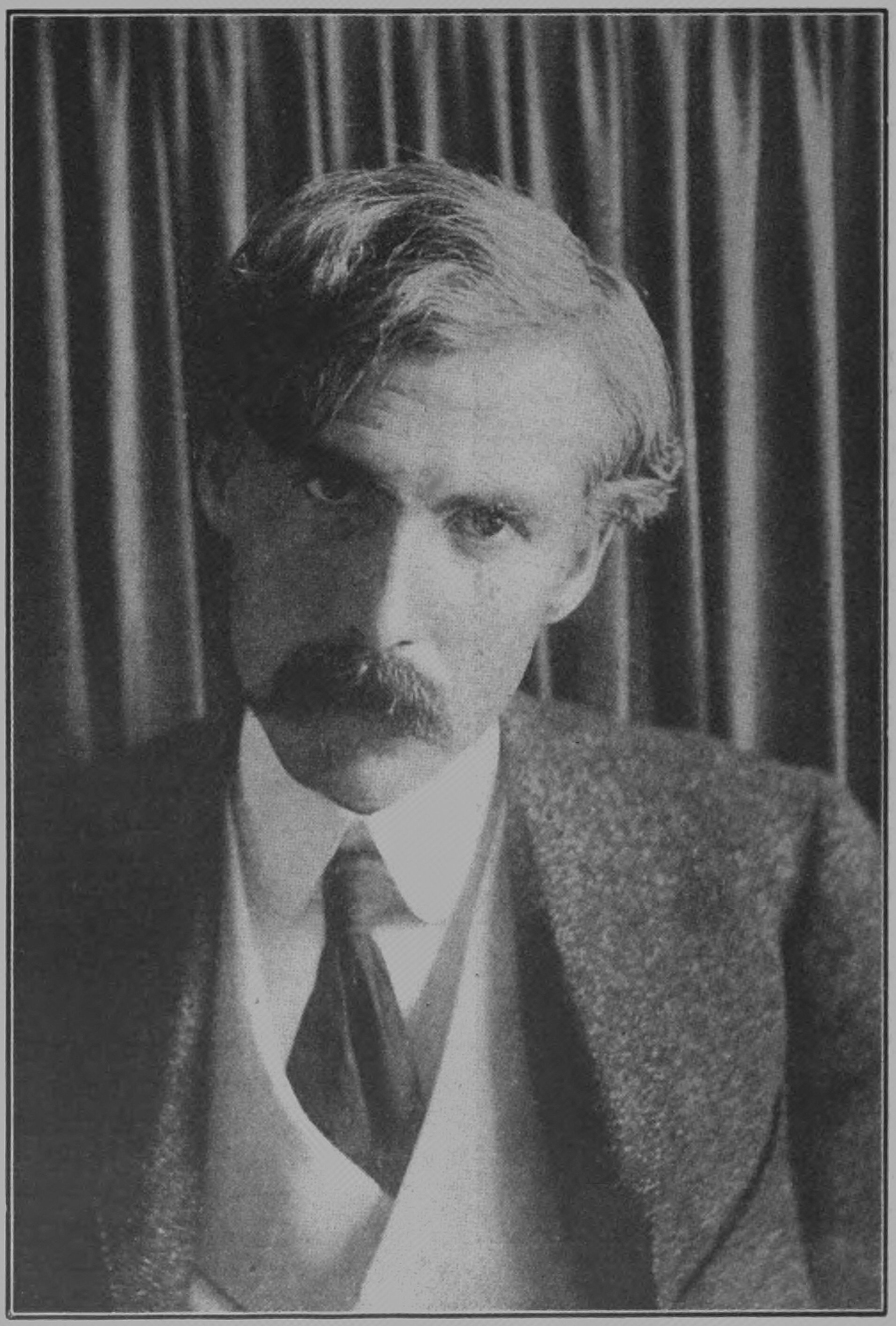
- Born: July 2, 1871; Brantford, Ontario, Canada
- Died: October 8, 1916 (aged 45)

Norman Duncan (2 July 1871 - 8 October 1916) was a writer, journalist and educator.

== Biography ==
Duncan was born in Brantford, Ontario, a son of Augustus and Susan (Hawley) Duncan. He was educated in the University of Toronto, graduating in 1895. At university, he was a friend of William Lyon Mackenzie King. His brother Robert Kennedy Duncan became a industrial chemist.

From 1897 to 1901 Duncan was on the staff of The New York Evening Post. After 1900, he lived mainly in the United States. In 1902, Duncan was appointed professor of rhetoric at Washington and Jefferson College in Washington, Pennsylvania, a position he held until 1906, when he became adjunct professor of English literature at the University of Kansas.

Duncan made several trips to Newfoundland and Labrador, which he then used as a setting for some of his books, including Doctor Luke of the Labrador, a novel featuring a thinly veiled Wilfred Grenfell as its protagonist. From 1907 to 1908 he was correspondent of Harper's Magazine in Syria, Palestine, Arabia and Egypt.

Duncan published over 20 books, including short stories, novels, and travel journalism.

== Works ==
- The Soul of the Street: Correlated Stories of the New York Syrian Quarter (1900)
- The Way of the Sea (1903)
- Doctor Luke of the Labrador (1904)
- Dr. Grenfell's Parish: The Deep Sea Fishermen (1905)
- The Adventures of Billy Topsail (1906)
- The Cruise of the Shining Light (1907)
- Every man for Himself (1908)
- Higgins - A Man's Christian (1909)
- The Suitable Child (1909)
- Going Down from Jerusalem: The Narrative of a Sentimental Traveller (1909)
- Measure of a Man: A Tale of the Big Woods (1911)
- The Best of a Bad Job: A Hearty Tale of the Sea (1912)
- Australian Byways: The Narrative of a Sentimental Traveller (1915)
- Billy Topsail, M.D. : A Tale of Adventure With Doctor Luke of the Labrador (1916)
- Battle Royal Down North (1918)
