= Elm Court (Butler, Pennsylvania) =

Historic house in Pennsylvania, United States

- U.S. National Register of Historic Places
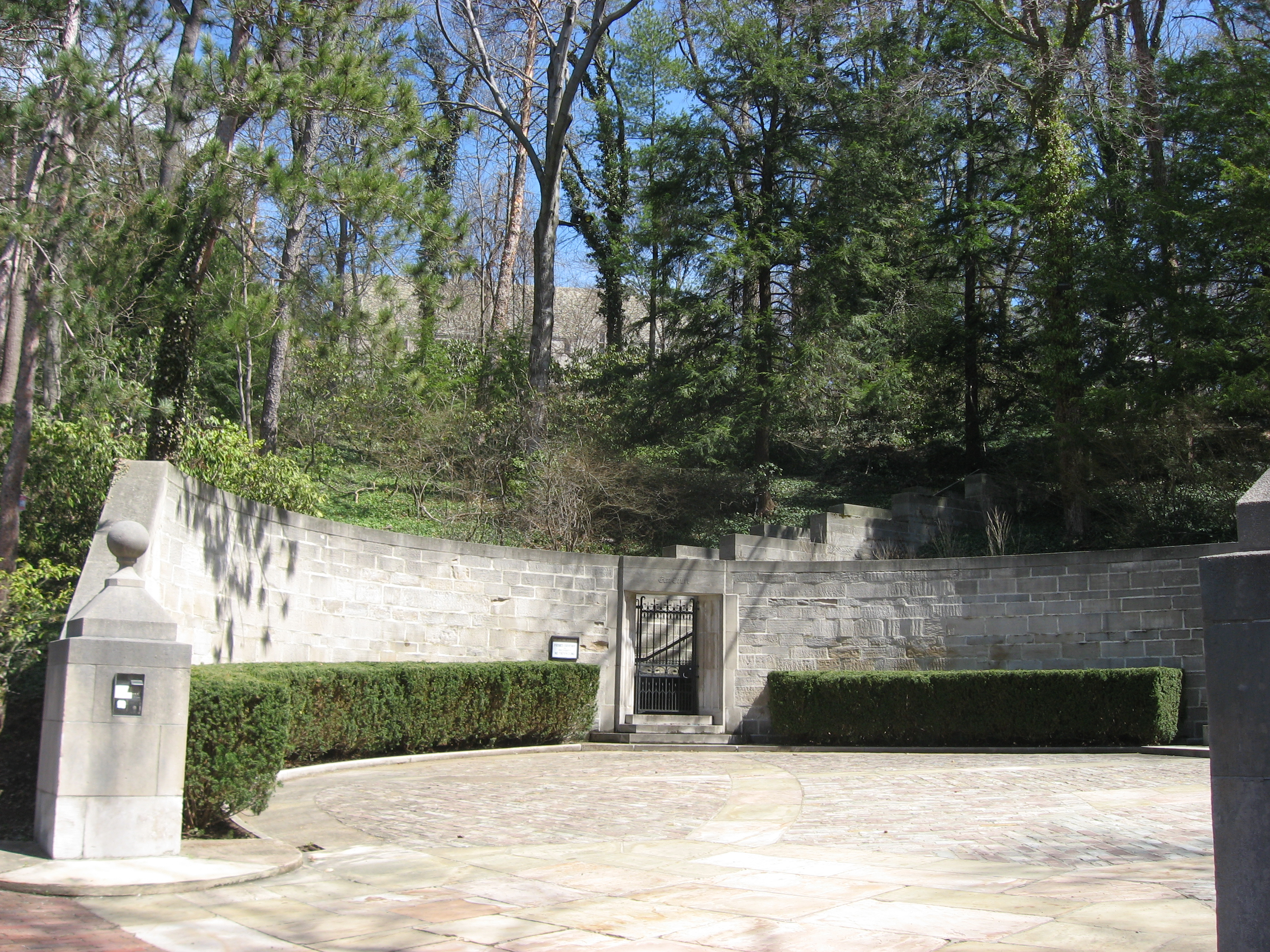
- Elm Court courtyard, April 2009

- Location within Pennsylvania Location within the United States
- Interactive map showing the location of Elm Court
- Location: Between Polk and Elm Sts., Butler, Pennsylvania
- Coordinates: 40°52′07″N 79°53′31″W
- Area: 9.4 acres (3.8 ha)
- Built: 1929-1930
- Built by: Wimer, Harry
- Architect: Janssen, Benno
- Architectural style: Tudor Revival, Other, Tudor Gothic revival
- NRHP reference No.: 79002176
- Added to NRHP: December 6, 1979

Elm Court, often referred to as Phillips Mansion, is a historic mansion located in Butler, Pennsylvania, Butler County, Pennsylvania. It was designed by architect Benno Janssen and built in 1929–1930. This 40-room residence is set into a hillside. The house measures 125.7 feet by 159 feet, and is built around a central courtyard. It is constructed of steel reinforced concrete and faced with limestone, marble, and slate. The house features complex slate roofs with many gables, large numbers of rectangular, oriel, and bay windows, interesting chimney treatments, and carved stone detailing reflecting the Tudor Revival style.

It was listed on the National Register of Historic Places in 1979.

== History ==
Benjamin D. Phillips, son of T.W. Phillips, founder of T.W. Phillips Gas & Oil Co, resided in this Tudor-Gothic mansion, noted often as "one of America's most spectacular private homes". The house was built for $1 million in 1929. It was completed in 1931 by Benno Janssen, a well known Pittsburgh architect. Construction of the home was completed by master-builder Harry Wimer, who also completed other properties in Western Pennsylvania including the T.W. Phillips Gas and Oil Company building, Union National Bank Building, and The Butler Eagle building, all located in Butler, Pennsylvania.

Although the mansion is over nearly 100 years old, it hasn't had many changes in ownership. Dean E. Burget and his wife, Undine Phillips Burget bought the mansion from the original owners in 1978. Frederick R. Koch purchased the mansion in 1988 for $1 million US dollars from the Burgets and the adjoining property for $900,000. Koch renovated and greatly expanded the mansion. Koch died in February 2020. The property is presently owned by the FRK Foundation.

The mansion houses the famous Skinner Organ, Opus 783, a player instrument with full console that was completely restored in 1990.
