= Robert Kennedy Duncan =

American industrial chemist

c. 1914

Robert Kennedy Duncan (1 November 1868 – 18 February 1914) was an American industrial chemist and promoter of research and chemical manufacturing in the United States. Best known for his popular writings on chemistry and industry, he helped establish a system for industries to sponsor research in the universities to collaborate and solve problems. He served as the first director of the Mellon Institute of Industrial Research.

== Life and work ==
Research on bread-making at the Mellon Institute, 1914

Duncan was born in Brantford, Ontario, to Robert Augustus Kennedy and Susan Hawley. He was a brother of Norman Duncan. He became interested in chemistry at school and joined the University of Toronto. After receiving a BA in 1892 he went to Clark University to study chemistry but left after a year and subsequently taught in schools in New York and Pennsylvania. He married Charlotte M. Foster in 1899 and they travelled together to Europe where he restarted studies in chemistry. He returned in 1901 and became a professor of chemistry at Washington and Jefferson College of Pennsylvania. Influenced by his brother Norman, a writer, he wrote popular articles on science and technology in McClure's and Harper's magazines with a sponsored trip to Europe. In 1903 he held patents on phosphorus manufacture, and in 1904 for manufacture of ornamental glassware. In 1905 he published his first book The New Knowledge and in 1907 he produced a book from a series of essays which was published as The Chemistry of Commerce. In 1906 he attended the 6th International Congress of Applied Chemistry in Rome. He wrote extensively about manufacturing industry and its links to chemistry which led to his being posted Duncan professor of industrial chemistry at the University of Kansas in 1907. He established industrial fellowships to connect universities to industry. He suggested that sponsor would get rights to patents and that fellows would published their work. This was begun at the University of Kansas and in 1910 he was invited by Andrew Mellon to establish a similar scheme at the University of Pittsburgh. One of the early works undertaken was to improving the baking industry and to produce better bread at a lower cost. This led to the establishment of the Mellon Institute of Industrial Research and School for Specific Industries with a $270,000 grant from the Mellon family in 1913. Duncan was made director but he died before the building was constructed. It later merged with the Carnegie Institute of Technology in 1967.
