= Robert W. White (golfer) =

Scottish golfer (1876–1959)

Robert White
- White, c. 1920

Personal information
- Full name: Robert W. White
- Nationality: Scotland; United States
- Born: June 2, 1876 St Andrews, Scotland
- Died: July 15, 1959, aged 83 Myrtle Beach, South Carolina, U.S.
- Children: 3

Career
- Sport: Golf
- College: University of Wisconsin-Madison
- Turned professional: c. 1892
- Former tour: PGA Tour

Best results in major championships
- Masters Tournament: DNP
- PGA Championship: DNP
- U.S. Open: 28th: 1897
- The Open Championship: DNP

Achievements and awards
- PGA Hall of Fame: 1994

Robert W. White (June 2, 1876 – July 15, 1959) was born in St Andrews, Scotland, and was a school teacher there before emigrating in 1894 to the United States to study agronomy at the University of Wisconsin-Madison. He worked as a professional and greenkeeper at several clubs and was an excellent clubmaker. He first took up a post as professional at the Myopia Hunt Club in 1895 and served at a number of other clubs, including Shawnee Country Club in 1914. White helped many young men from the British Isles find work in the United States as golf professionals and greenkeepers. White, who was best known as a golf course architect and golf administrator, was an accomplished golfer but didn't post many notable results. He entered and played in a few U.S. Open tournaments around the turn of the century, in 1897 and again in 1901. In the 1897 U.S. Open, White carded rounds of 89-97=186 and finished well back in the field.

White served as president of the Western Professional Golfers' Association in 1908 and became the first president of the Professional Golfers' Association of America in 1916. He held the office through 1919. During his career he also designed a number of golf courses, many located in eastern Pennsylvania. White also was one of the founders of the American Society of Golf Course Architects. He was inducted into the PGA Hall of Fame in 1994. White is also credited with the initial design and construction of the first putting green for Dwight Eisenhower at The White House in Washington D.C. in 1954.

== Courses designed ==
Note: This list may be incomplete.

- Berkleigh Country Club, Kutztown, Pennsylvania
- Blue at East Potomac Public Golf Course - Public, Washington, D.C.
- Blue/Red at Buck Hill Falls Golf Club, Buck Hill Falls, Pennsylvania
- Cincinnati Country Club, Cincinnati, Ohio
- Edward B. McLean Estate Private Golf Course at Wisconsin Avenue, Washington, D.C.
- Glen Brook Country Club, Stroudsburg, Pennsylvania
- Green Brook Country Club North Caldwell, New Jersey
- Green Hills Golf Course, Birdsboro, Pennsylvania
- Harkers Hollow Golf Club, Phillipsburg, New Jersey
- Longue Vue Club, Verona, Pennsylvania
- Manasquan River Golf Club, Brielle, New Jersey
- Northampton Country Club, Easton, Pennsylvania
- Ocean Forest Country Club, also known as Pine Lakes Country Club, Myrtle Beach, South Carolina, listed on the National Register of Historic Places in 1996.
- Pine Lakes Country Club, Myrtle Beach, South Carolina
- Red at East Potomac Public Golf Course, Washington, D.C.
- Red/White at Buck Hill Falls Golf Club, Buck Hill Falls, Pennsylvania
- Richmond County Country Club, Staten Island, New York
- Rockland Country Club, Sparkill, New York
- Shorehaven Golf Club, East Norwalk, Connecticut
- Silver Spring Country Club, Ridgefield, Connecticut
- Skytop Lodge, Skytop, Pennsylvania
- Swamp Fox Golf Club, Greeleyville, South Carolina
- Water Gap Country Club, Delaware Water Gap, Pennsylvania
- White at East Potomac Public Golf Course, Washington, D.C.

== Death ==
White died in Myrtle Beach, South Carolina, in July 1959. He was survived by a son and two daughters.
