= Benno Janssen =

American architect

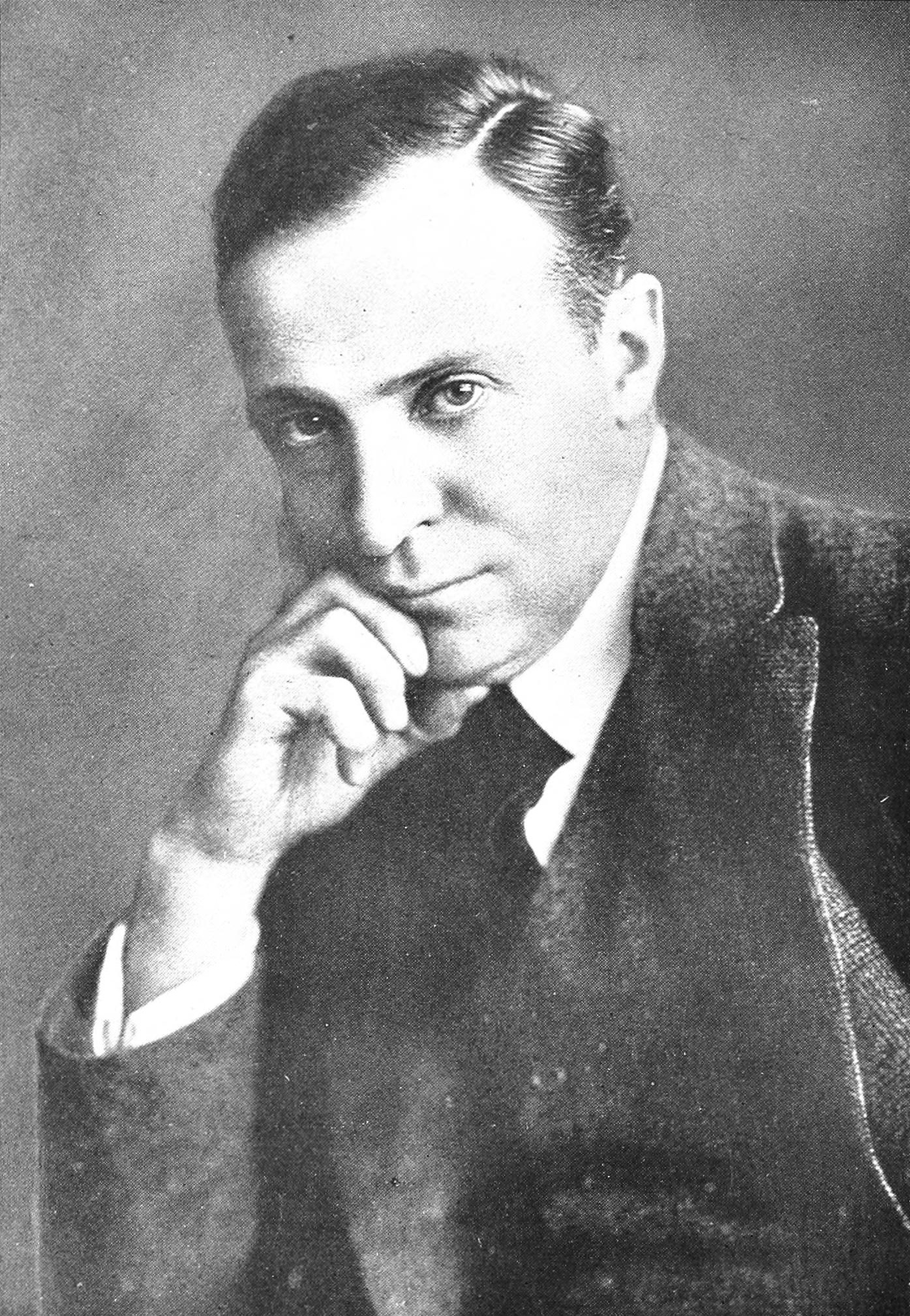
- Janssen from Western Pennsylvanians, 1923
- Born: March 12, 1874; St. Louis, Missouri, U.S.
- Died: October 14, 1964 (aged 90); Charlottesville, Virginia, U.S.
- Education: University of Kansas; Massachusetts Institute of Technology; École des Beaux-Arts
- Occupation: Architect
- Employer(s): Janssen & Abbott; Janssen & Cocken
- Known for: Pittsburgh Athletic Association (1911); Pittsburgh Masonic Temple (1915 - now Alumni Hall of the University of Pittsburgh); William Penn Hotel (1916 and again in 1928); Elm Court (1929) Fanny Edel Falk Laboratory School (1931); Mellon Institute (1937)
- Spouse: Edith Patton
- Children: Mary Patton Janssen, Benno Janssen Jr., and Alexander Patton Janssen
- Parent(s): Oscar Janssen and Thekla Susenbeth

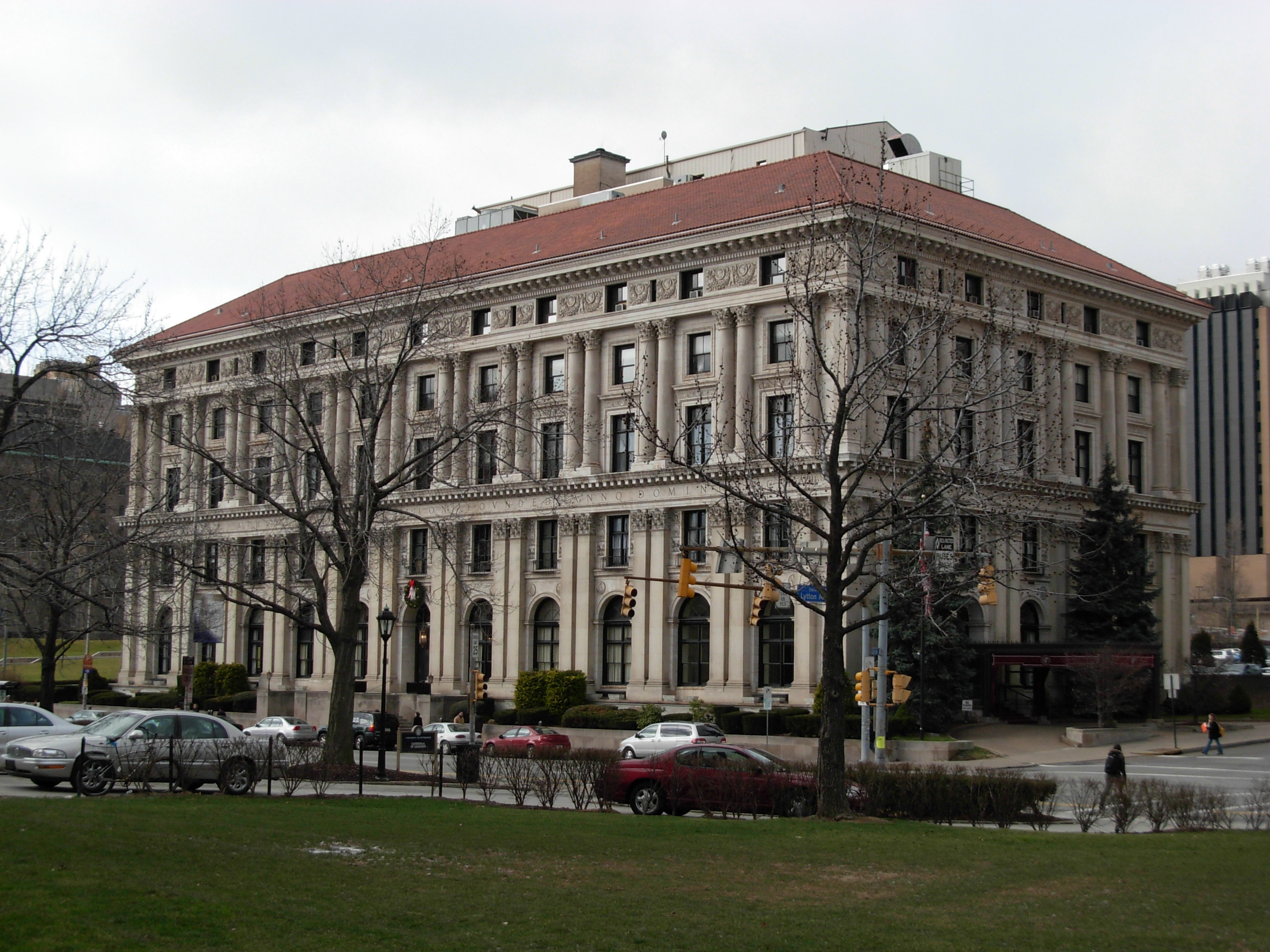
The Pittsburgh Athletic Association (1911), listed on the National Register of Historic Places

Benno Janssen (March 12, 1874 – October 14, 1964) was an American architect.

== Childhood, education and career ==
Benno Janssen was born in St. Louis, Missouri, the son of Oscar Janssen and Thekla Susenbeth. Janssen studied at the University of Kansas. In 1899, he began working in architecture in Boston, Massachusetts. He also continued his studies at the Massachusetts Institute of Technology. In 1902, Janssen headed for Paris, France, and further studied at the École des Beaux-Arts. In 1905, he returned to the United States to work in Pittsburgh, Pennsylvania, for the architectural firm MacClure & Spahr. Janssen left that firm, along with Franklin Abbott, to form their own partnership in 1906, Janssen & Abbott, which remained active until Abbott's retirement in 1918. Janssen next joined with William York Cocken in 1922, and together they started the architectural firm Janssen & Cocken.

== Architectural work - commercial ==
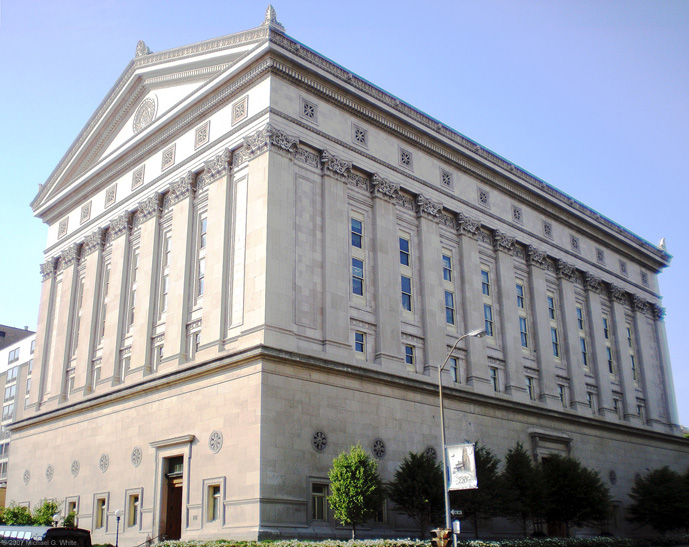
Alumni Hall (1915) at the University of Pittsburgh, formerly the Masonic Temple, went through a two-year, $16 million preservation and renovation effort that was completed in 2000

He is best known for monumental buildings such as the Pittsburgh Athletic Association (1911), the Masonic Temple (1915 - now Alumni Hall of the University of Pittsburgh), William Penn Hotel (1916 and again in 1928), Mellon Institute (1937), the Longue Vue Club (1923), Rolling Rock Club and Stables (1928 - near Ligonier, Pennsylvania), the T.W. Phillips Gas & Oil Company (Butler, Pennsylvania), the Keystone Athletic Club (1929 - now Lawrence Hall of Point Park University), and the Washington Crossing Bridge (Pittsburgh), also called the 40th Street Bridge (1924).

== Architectural work - residential ==
Janssen also designed many fine residences, including the country estate of George Calvert (1912); the Lee L. Chandler House (1924) in Shadyside; Elm Court, the estate of B.D. Phillips in Butler, Pennsylvania (1929); as well as Fox Chapel's Frank B. Ingersoll House (1931) and La Tourelle, the Edgar J. Kaufmann house (1923). Janssen received many Kaufmann commissions over the years.

The prevailing architectural motif of these Benno Janssen homes was a picturesquely irregular configuration of buildings rambling around a central courtyard. Other features these homes shared include: complex slate roofs with many gables, large groups of rectangular windows, rich oriel and bay windows, interesting chimney treatments, and intricately carved stone detailing.

Many of Janssen's buildings also boast museum-quality wrought-iron by noted Philadelphia artisan Samuel Yellin. Janssen collaborated with Yellin for 25 years, resulting in gracious iron details in his most important projects.

== Personal life ==
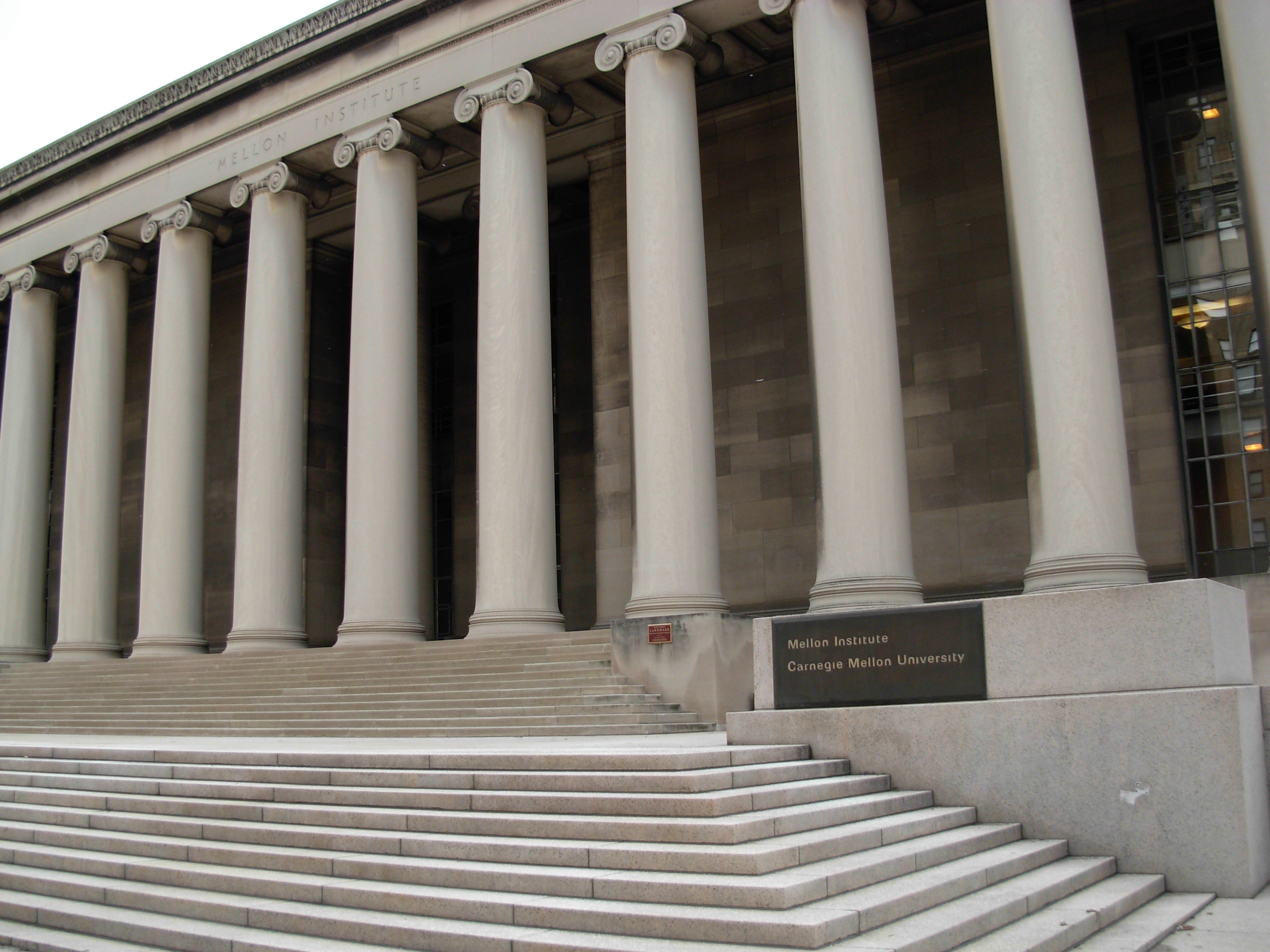
Mellon Institute (1937) is known for its monolithic columns, the largest such one-piece columns in the world

Benno Janssen married Edith Patton, the daughter of Central Pennsylvania businessman and future State Senator Alexander Ennis Patton and Mary Boynton Dill, on December 28, 1889, in Curwensville, Clearfield County, Pennsylvania. The Janssens were the parents of Mary Patton Janssen, Benno Janssen Jr., and Alexander Patton Janssen.

Janssen retired in 1939 and died in Charlottesville, Virginia, on October 14, 1964.

== Photo gallery of works ==
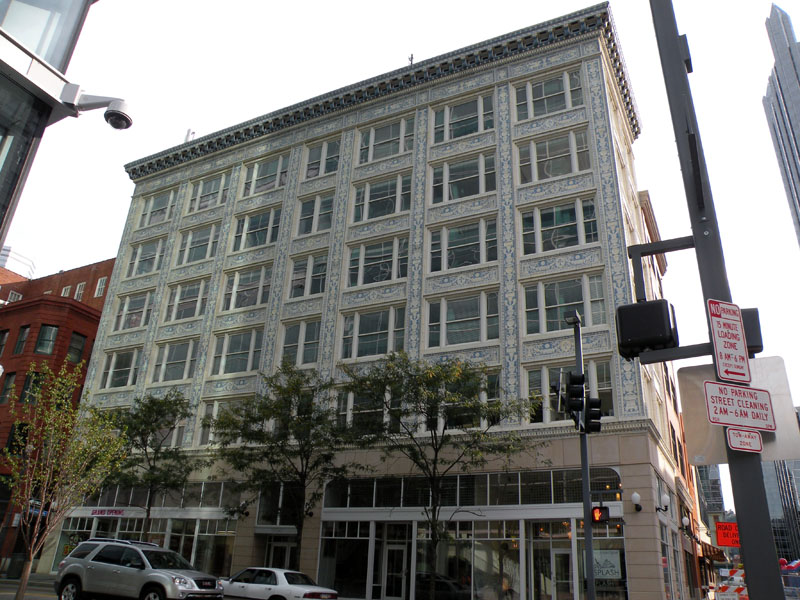
Buhl Building at 204 Fifth Avenue in Downtown Pittsburgh (1913)

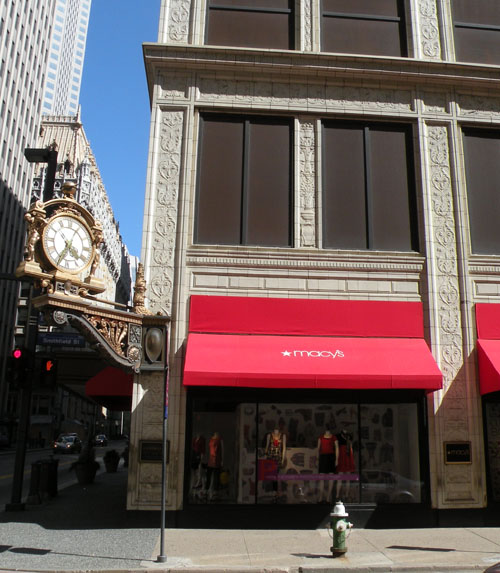
Kaufmann's department store in downtown Pittsburgh, designed by Charles Bickel in 1898, with an addition done by Janssen & Abbott in 1913

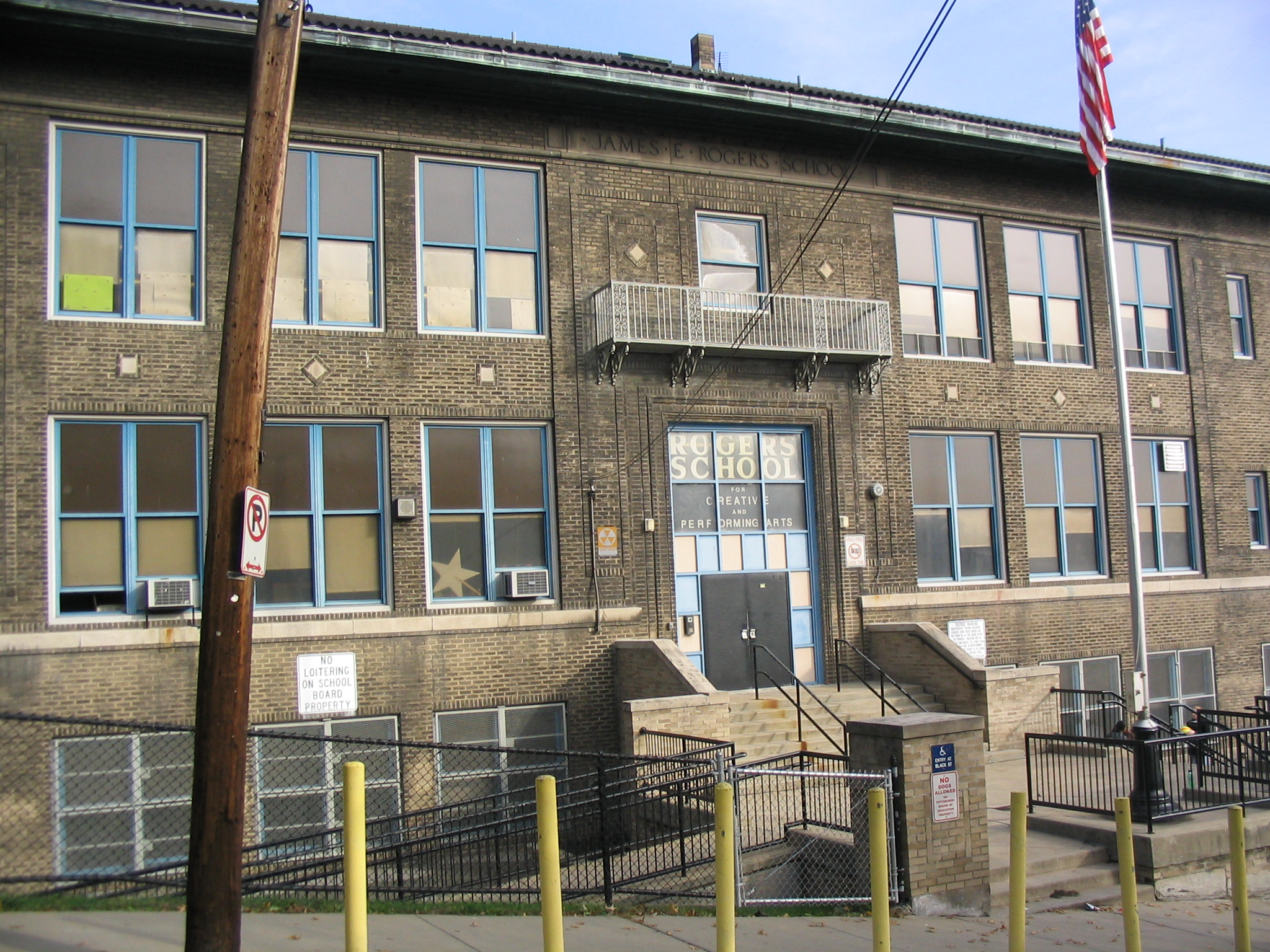
Rogers School for the Creative and Performing Arts, Pittsburgh (1914)

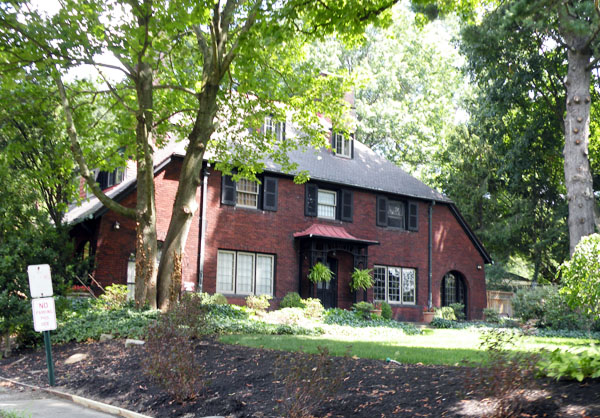
George J. Schmitt House, designed by Janssen & Abbott (1916)

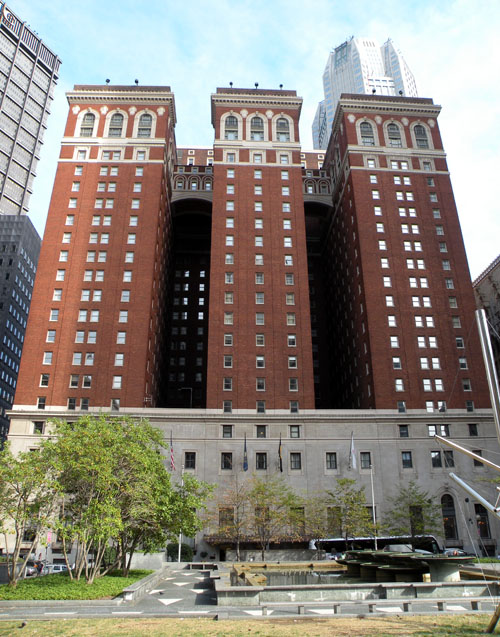
William Penn Hotel (1916 & 1928)

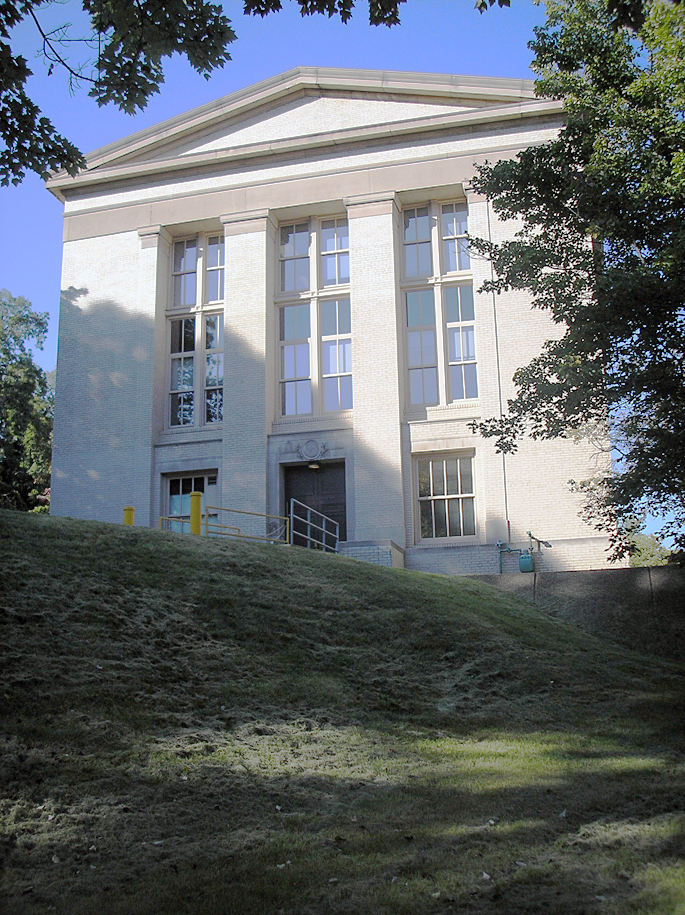
Alumni Hall (1921), now Eberly Hall at the University of Pittsburgh

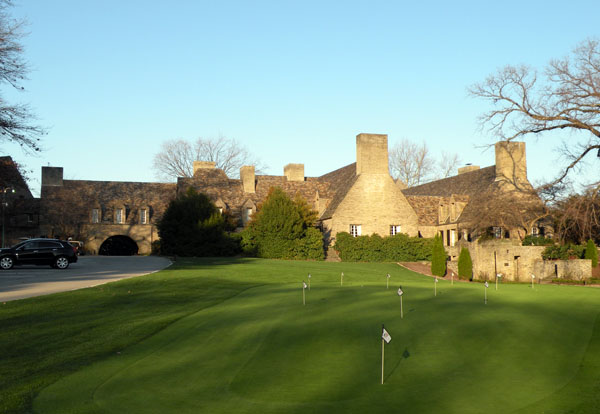
Longue Vue Club (1923), in Penn Hills, Pennsylvania.

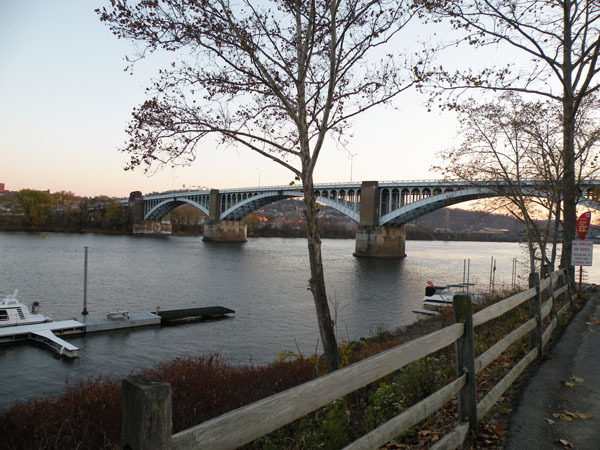
Fortieth Street Bridge, Pittsburgh (1924)

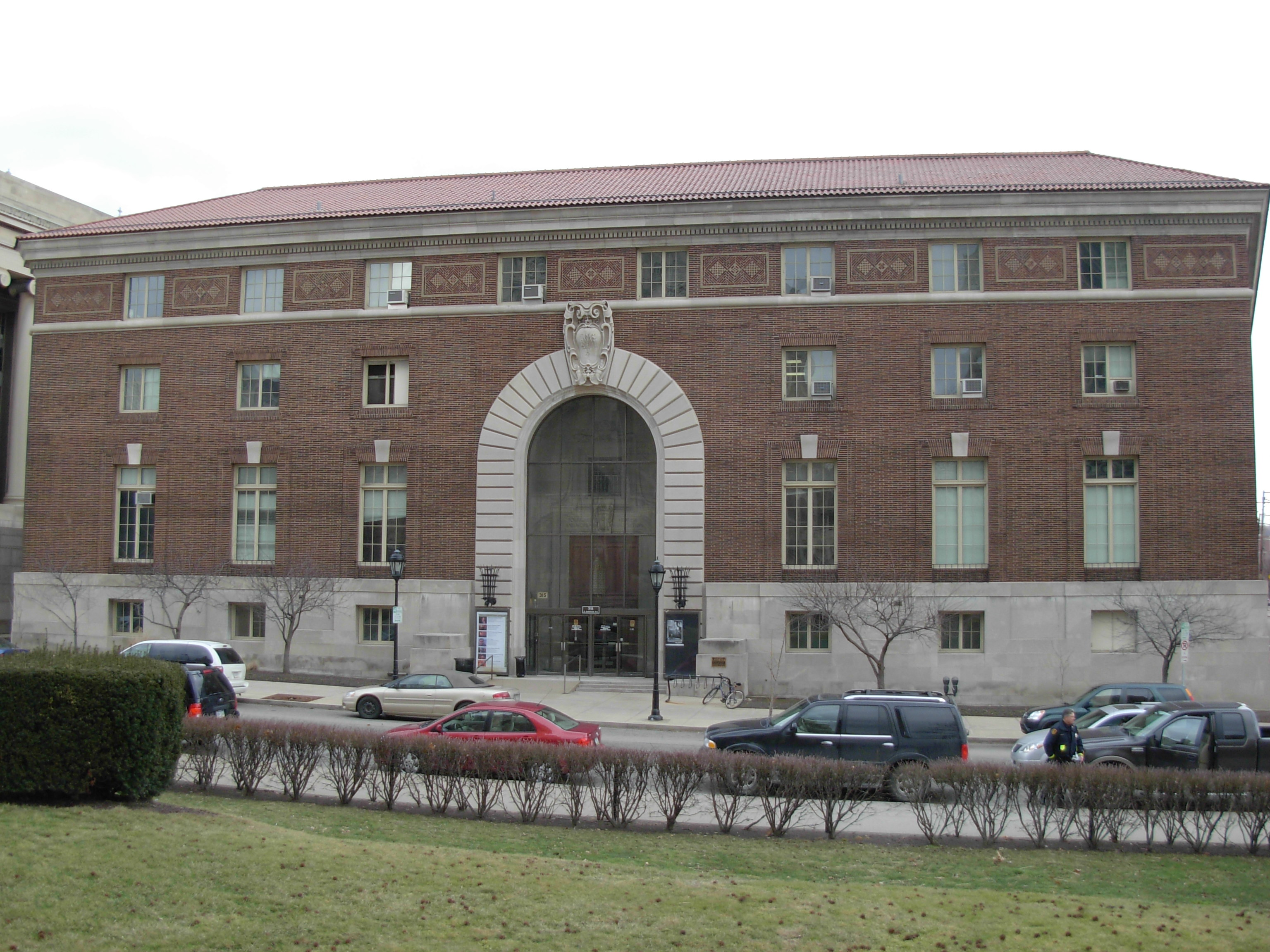
The Y.M.H.A. (1926), now Bellefield Hall at the University of Pittsburgh

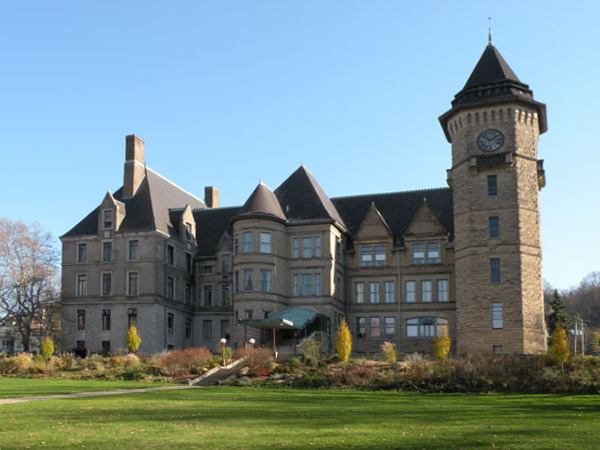
Westinghouse Air Brake Company General Office Building in Wilmerding, PA, designed by Frederick J. Osterling in 1890, with additional designs done by Janssen & Cocken in 1927

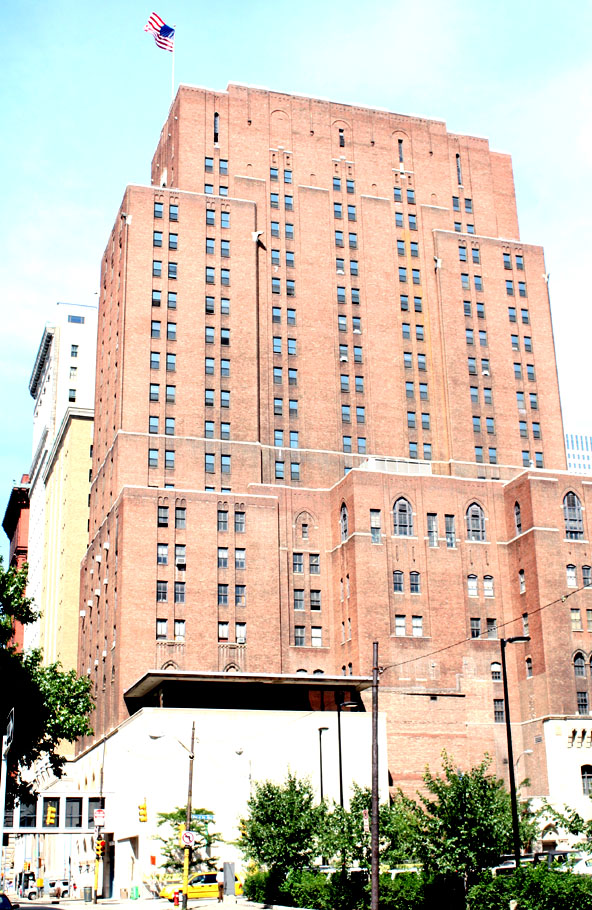
Keystone Athletic Club (1929), now Lawrence Hall at Point Park University

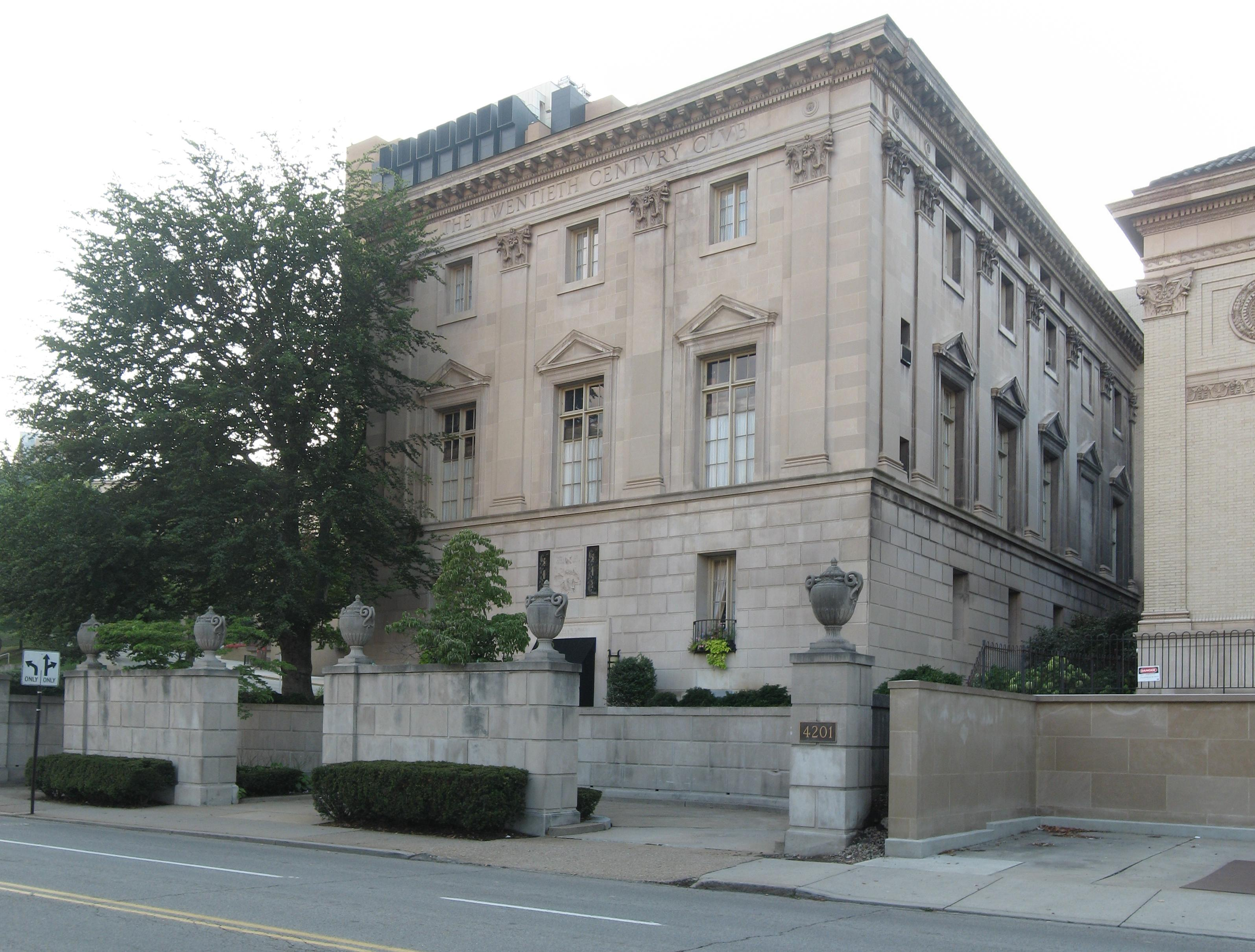
20th Century Club (1930)

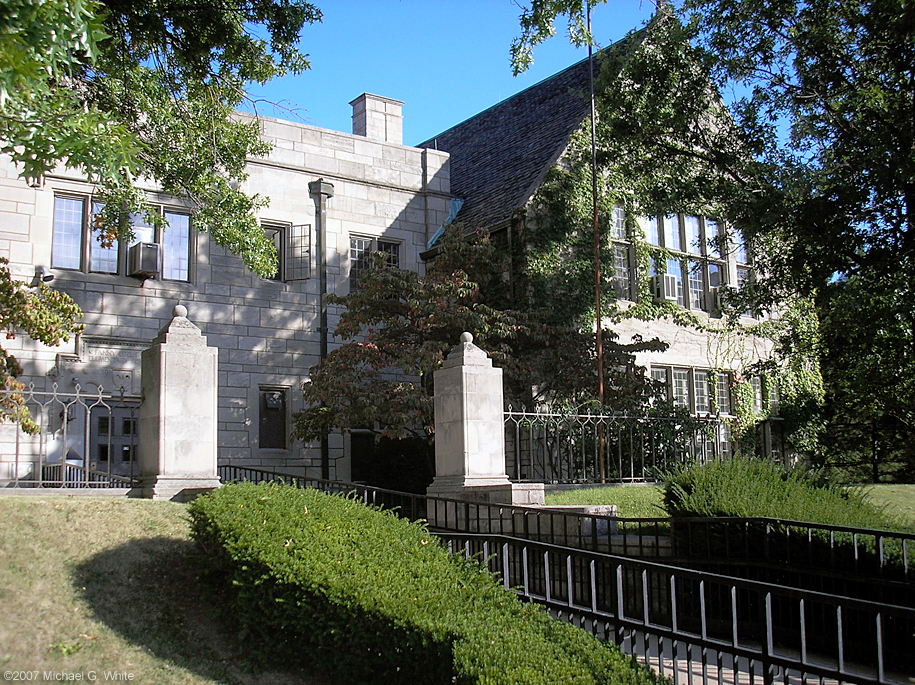
Fanny Edel Falk Laboratory School building (1931) at the University of Pittsburgh
