= Buhl Building (Pittsburgh, Pennsylvania) =

- U.S. National Register of Historic Places
- Pittsburgh Landmark – PHLF
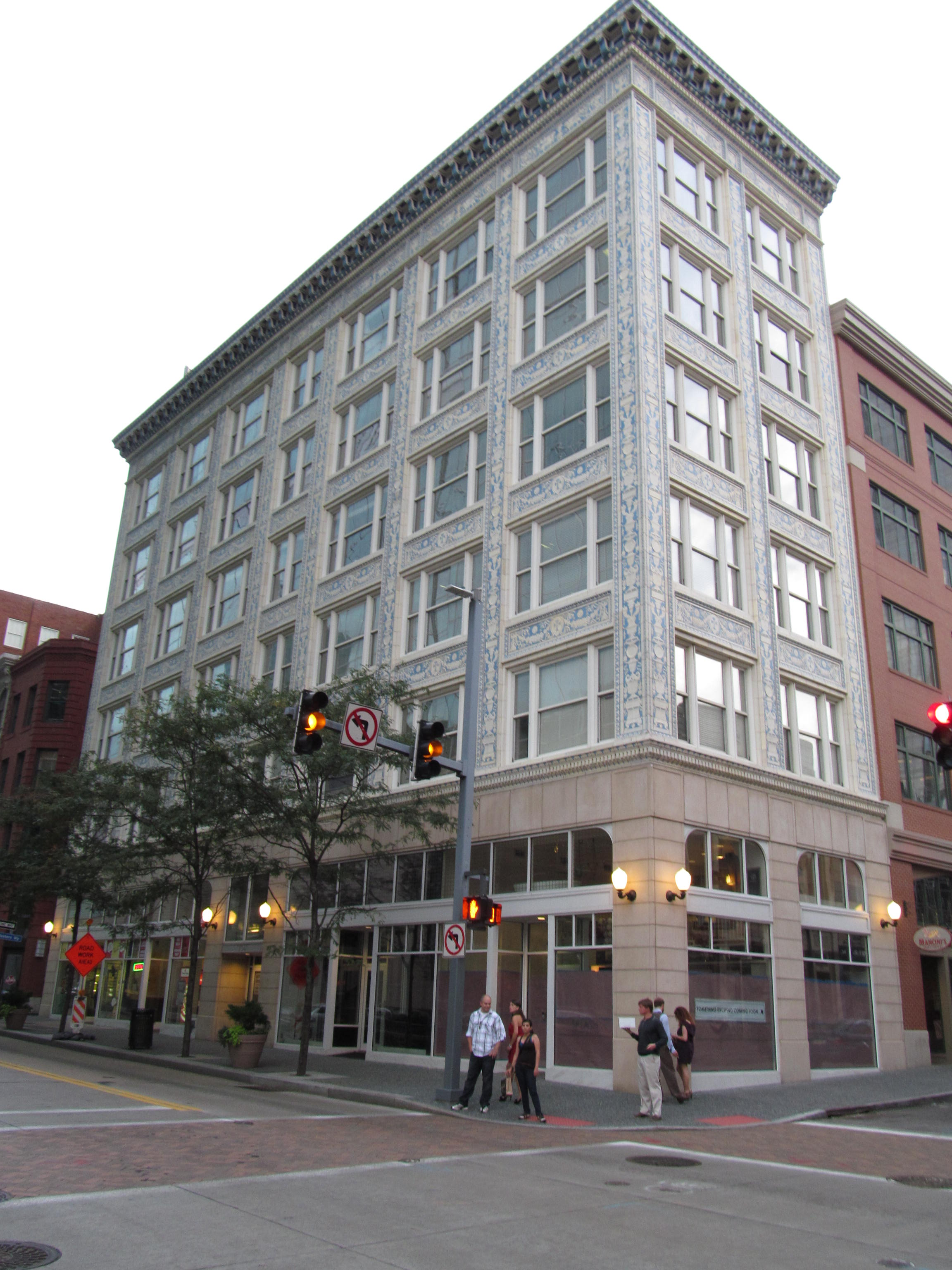
- The Buhl Building in 2012

- Location within Pittsburgh Location within Pennsylvania Location within the United States
- Location: 204 5th Ave. (corner of 5th and Market), Pittsburgh, Pennsylvania
- Coordinates: 40°26′28″N 80°0′7″W
- Area: 0.1 acres (0.040 ha)
- Built: 1913
- Architect: Janssen & Abbott
- Architectural style: Chicago School
- NRHP reference No.: 80003406

Significant dates
- Added to NRHP: January 3, 1980
- Designated PHLF: 1981

The Buhl Building is a historic commercial building in downtown Pittsburgh, Pennsylvania, United States. Built in 1913 in the Chicago school (architecture) style, the building is faced with multi-colored terra cotta tiles.

It was added to the National Register of Historic Places on January 3, 1980. It is also listed as a landmark by the Pittsburgh History and Landmarks Foundation.
