= Félix de la Concha =

Spanish-American painter

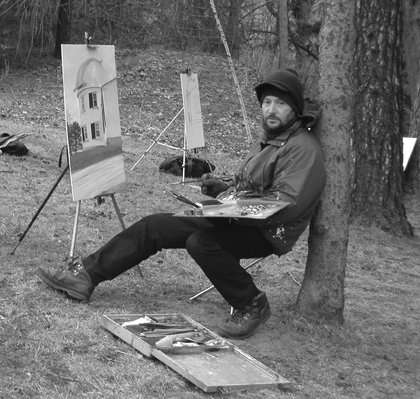
- Félix de la Concha in New Hampshire in 2006
- Born: 20 August 1962 (age 64); León, Spain
- Education: Facultad de Bellas Artes de Madrid
- Known for: Painting
- Movement: Realism
- Awards: Rome Prize by the Real Academia de Bellas Artes de San Fernando

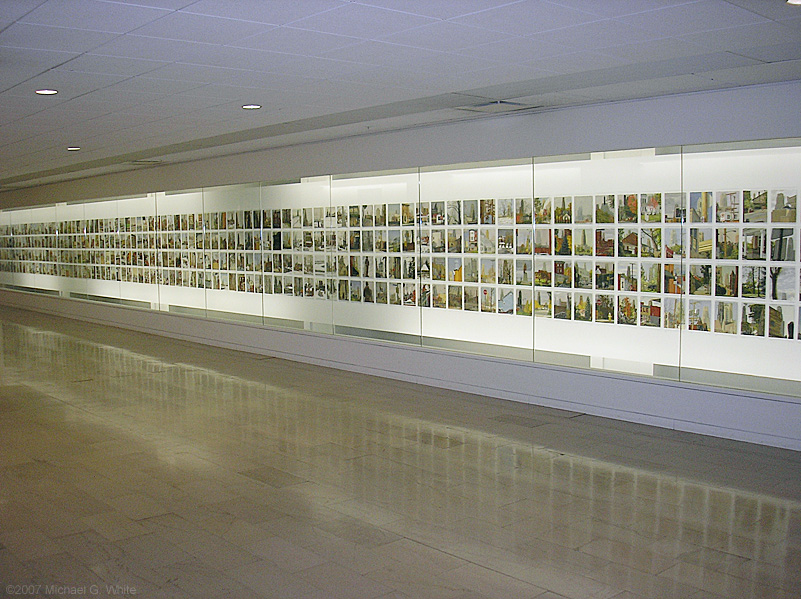
One A Day: 365 Views of the Cathedral of Learning. Alumni Hall (University of Pittsburgh)

Félix de la Concha (born 1962) is a painter. Born in León, Spain, he resides in Pittsburgh and Madrid.

In 1985 he was selected to participate in the Primera Muestra de Arte Joven (Círculo de Bellas Artes de Madrid) where his work was awarded. Since then he has had several shows, mainly in Europe and the United States, including one person exhibitions in the Columbus Museum of Art (1998), Carnegie Museum of Art in Pittsburgh (1999), Hood Museum of Art (2009), the Frick Art & Historical Center (2004), Museo de Bellas Artes in Santander (1995), Museo del Chopo, México D.F. (1994), Centro Cultural La Recoleta in Buenos Aires (1993), and Rómulo Gallegos Center for Latin American Studies in Caracas (1993).

His work One A Day: 365 Views of the Cathedral of Learning, a series that he painted every day during one year while staying in Pittsburgh, is a permanent exhibit at the University of Pittsburgh's Alumni Hall. He has also done other series of paintings in different places such as Rome (the city where he went with a scholarship granted by the Spanish Academy and where he lived from 1989 until 1994), Santander, Seville and Cairo.

He has focused on a particular format of portraiture. It can be seen in the video the sitter talking, and the painting evolving from blank canvas to the very conclusion of the work. As painted neither from photographs neither from previous sketches, and usually with a single session (alla prima), eventual errors are keen to him. He introduces the term pictorial anacoluthon, going back to the Greek origin of the term anacoluthon (meaning inconclusive) and its rhetorical use: As with spoken language, there will be mistakes, both in the portrait's symmetry, and in its sense of completeness. However, what may be considered, at first, a formal mistake may also be a form of expression. However he accomplishes accurate detail.

The first of this series was exhibited at the Museo Contemporáneo de Madrid in 2008.

51 portraits were exhibited at the Hood Museum of Art, Dartmouth College, with the theme of Conflict and Reconciliation in 2009.

He has also immersed himself in communities, whether in New Hampshire and Vermont, Iowa or Pennsylvania, or in his native Spain. He has portrayed and interviewed Holocaust survivors around the world.

More recently, he has become interested in portraits with music and synaesthesia, as his performance with the Toledo Symphony Orchestra.

On Fallingwater En Perspectiva he accepted the invitation to an extended residency with unprecedented access to the building and grounds.

== List of exhibitions ==
=== One man shows ===
- 2026
  - Coreografías de la atención. La Térmica Cultural (CIUDEN). Ponferrada
- 2024
  - Iowa. Galería Fernández-Braso, Madrid. Text by Armando Montesinos.
  - Splendor and Passion. Boca Raton Museum of Art, Boca Raton (Florida)
  - Las Meninas under an Artificial Light. Museo Casa Botines Gaudí, León
  - Not only in América. Galería Ármaga, León
  - Vistas al Mar. Un Paisaje Pintoresco. Librería Gil, Santander
- 2022
  - Torres Blancas después de Fallingwater. Galería Fernández-Braso. Madrid. Text by María Escribano.
  - Pórticos. Museo Lázaro Galdiano. Madrid.
- 2021
  - Maldito Realismo. Centro de Arte Faro de Cabo Mayor. Santander.
- 2019
  - This is America. Galería Siboney. Santander.
- 2018
  - Made in USA. Galería Ármaga. León. Text by Martín López-Vega.
- 2016
  - Pintando Albacete. Museo Municipal de Albacete. Albacete, Spain
  - The Dinosaur Was Still in Iowa. CSPS Hall. Cedar Rapids, Iowa.
- 2015
  - Hermitage Artist Intrigue. Alfstad& Contemporary. Sarasota, Flórida
  - Portraying Holocaust Survivors. Weisman Museum of Art. Minneapolis.
- 2013
  - Painting Iowa a pleno sol. Instituto Cervantes. Chicago.
  - Balat? Plato Sanat. Estambul. Turquía. Curator Marcus Graf.
- 2012
  - Panorama WBZ. Through the Looking-Glass. Permanent installation at the Executive Campus of the University of St. Gallen. St. Gallen, Switzerland.
  - Sangallensia IV. Christian Roellin Gallery. St. Gallen, Switzerland.
- 2011
  - Performance with the Toledo Symphony Orchestra. Toledo Museum of Art. Toledo, Ohio.
  - Fallingwater En Perspectiva. Concept Art Gallery. Pittsburgh, Pennsylvania.
  - Portraits With Conversation: Fifty Writers With Anacoluthon.Museo Casa de Cervantes. Valladolid.
- 2010
  - Perspective and Location. BigTown Gallery. Rochester, Vermont.
  - La historia más larga de Bilbao jamás pintada. Galerías Epelde Mardaras & Catálogo General, Bilbao.
- 2009
  - Public Portraits/Private Conversations. Hood Museum of Art and Baker Memorial Library, Dartmouth College, Hanover, New Hampshire.
  - Price Tower Arts Center, Bartlesville, Oklahoma.
  - Park Well. Galería Trama. Barcelona.
  - Melvin Gallery. Florida Southern College. Lakeland, Florida.
- 2008
  - Nueva Inglaterra. Galería Leandro Navarro, Madrid.
  - Retratos con conversación. Museo de Arte Contemporáneo de Madrid.
  - Fallingwater En Perspectiva. The State Museum of Pennsylvania, Harrisburg.
- 2007
  - Fallingwater En Perspectiva. The Barn at Fallingwater, Pennsylvania.
- 2006
  - Penn at Braddock. Concept Art Gallery. Pittsburgh, Pennsylvania.
- 2005
  - Visiones de Nueva Inglaterra. Cooler Gallery. White River Junction, Vermont.
  - Sala Luzán. Caja de Ahorros de la Inmaculada. Zaragoza.
- 2004
  - Awarded artist in the 17 Bienal de Zamora. Museo Etnográfico de Castilla y León, y Fundación Rei Afonso Enriques, Zamora. Spain.
  - A Contrarreloj. A Race Against Time. The Frick Art & Historical Center, Pittsburgh, Pennsylvania.
  - Museo Gustavo Maeztu, Estella. Spain
  - Galería Dieciseis. San Sebastián-Donosti. Spain.
  - ARCO'04. Galería Dieciseis, Madrid.
- 2003
  - Farewell to Pittsburgh. Concept Art Gallery. Pittsburgh, Pennsylvania.
- 2002
  - Galería Artnueve, Murcia. Spain.
  - Lonja del Pescado. Ayuntamiento de Alicante, Alicante. Spain. Curator: Pedro Alberto Cruz.
  - Galería Lourdes Carcedo, Burgos. Spain
  - Pittsburgh, Galería Marlborough Madrid, Madrid. Text by Mark Francis
- 2001
  - Penn Avenue, from Pearl Street to Gross Street. Garfield Artworks. Presented by The Penn Arts Initiative (PAAI). Pittsburgh, Pennsylvania.
  - Diario de la Habana. Centro Cultural Español. Miami, Florida.
- 2000
  - One A Day. 365 Views of the Cathedral of Learning. Alumni Hall (the old Masonic Temple). University of Pittsburgh, Pennsylvania.
- 1999
  - Columbus. Galería Antonio Machón, Madrid.
  - One A Day. 365 Views of the Cathedral of Learning. Carnegie Museum of Art. Pittsburgh, Pennsylvania. Curator: Madeleine Grynsztejn. Text by Mark Francis.
  - Doble-Double. Concept Art Gallery. Pittsburgh, Pennsylvania.
- 1998
  - El espíritu del lugar. Galería Rafael Ortiz, Seville. Spain.
  - Columbus Cornered. Columbus Museum of Art, Columbus, Ohio. Curator: Annegreth Nill.
- 1997
  - Fuera de campo. Galería Siboney, Santander. Spain.
- 1996
  - Borderline. Galería Fúcares, Madrid.
  - Escenarios para una larga temporada. Galería Antonio Machón, Madrid.
- 1995
  - Veraneos en Santander. Museo de Bellas Artes. Santander. Spain. Curator: Juan Riancho.
  - El cuadro grande no cabe en el coche. Galería Fúcares, Almagro. Spain.
  - Ciriego. Espacio Caja Burgos, Burgos. Spain.
- 1994
  - Museo Universitario del Chopo, México D.F.
  - Despliegues. Sala Cultural Caja España, Zamora. Sala San Torcuato de Caja España, Zamora. Casa de Cultura, Junta de Castilla y León. Galería Cirac, Zamora. Spain.
  - Despliegues. Sala Cultural, Caja España, Valladolid. Spain.
  - Despliegues. Casa de las Carnicerías de Caja España. Sala Cultural de Caja España, León. Spain.
  - Galería Maese Nicolás, León. Spain.
- 1993
  - Centro Cultural Español, Santiago de Chile.
  - Sala Rómulo Gallegos del CELARG, Caracas.
  - Galería Antonia Jannone, Milán. Text by Martina Corgnati.
  - Centro Cultural La Recoleta, Buenos Aires.
  - Museo Juan B. Castagnino, Rosario-Argentina.
  - Sala del Cabildo, Montevideo.
  - Paesaggio di Passaggio. Temple Gallery, Rome.
- 1992
  - Nueve Meses en Donna Olimpia. Galería Gamarra y Garrigues, Madrid.
- 1991
  - One day exhibition of Nove Mesi a Donna Olimpia. Cortile di Donna Olimpia, Rome. Text by Ludovico Pratesi.
  - Galería Clave, Murcia. Spain.
- 1989
  - Galería Gamarra y Garrigues, Madrid. Text by Juan Hidalgo.
- 1988
  - ARCO'88. Galería Estampa, Madrid.
- 1986
  - Galería Estampa, Madrid.

=== Works in museums and public collections ===
- Boca Raton Museum of Art, Boca Raton, Florida. USA.
- University of St. Gallen. St. Gallen, Switzerland.
- Toledo Museum of Art, Toledo, Ohio. USA
- Hood Museum of Art. Hanover, New Hampshire. USA.
- Dartmouth College Library, Hanover, New Hampshire. USA.
- La Pedrera. Fundació Caixa Catalunya, Barcelona. Spain
- Caja de Ahorros de la Inmaculada, Zaragoza. Spain.
- Frick Art & Historical Center, Pittsburgh, Pennsylvania. USA.
- David L. Lawrence Convention Center, Pittsburgh, Pennsylvania. USA.
- Museo de Arte Contemporáneo, Madrid, Spain
- Lonja de Alicante. Ayuntamiento de Alicante, Alicante. Spain.
- The University of Pittsburgh's Alumni Hall (previously the Masonic Temple), Pittsburgh, Pennsylvania. USA.
- Carnegie Museum of Art, Pittsburgh, Pennsylvania. USA.
- Columbus Museum of Art, Columbus, Ohio. USA.
- Colección La Caixa, Colecció Testimoni, Barcelona. Spain.
- Teatro Real, Madrid. Spain.
- Museo de Arte Contemporaneo de Madrid, Madrid. Spain.
- Museo d'Arte Costantino Barbella. Italy.
- Museo de Bellas Artes, Santander. Spain.
- Colección Saldañuela, Caja Burgos, Burgos. Spain.
- Ministerio de Cultura, Instituto de la Juventud, Madrid. Spain.
- Ministerio de Defensa, Madrid. Spain.
- Ayuntamiento de Albacete, Albacete. Spain.
- Consejería de Cultura de Murcia, Murcia. Spain.
- Colección Campsa. Madrid. Spain.
- Colección Banco de España, Madrid. Spain.
- Academia de Bellas Artes de San Fernando, Madrid. Spain.
