= George O. Curme Jr. =

American chemist

George Oliver Curme Jr. (December 24, 1888 – July 28, 1976) was an American industrial chemist, working with the synthesis of various chemicals — including acetylene and ethylene glycol — from petroleum byproducts.

Born in Iowa; he received his PhD in chemistry from the University of Chicago (1913), after which he spent some time in Germany, studying with Fritz Haber. He returned to the US in 1914 and worked at the Mellon Institute, funded by the Prest-O-Lite company, which was absorbed into Union Carbide in 1917. He became a Union Carbide VP in charge of chemical research in 1944. He died in 1976 in Oak Bluffs, Massachusetts.

He received the Chandler Medal in 1933, the Perkin Medal in 1935, the Elliott Cresson Medal in 1936, the Willard Gibbs Award in 1944, and the University of Chicago Alumni Medal in 1954.
