= Buck Hill Falls, Pennsylvania =

Community in Pennsylvania, US

Coordinates: 41.18884°N 75.26637°W

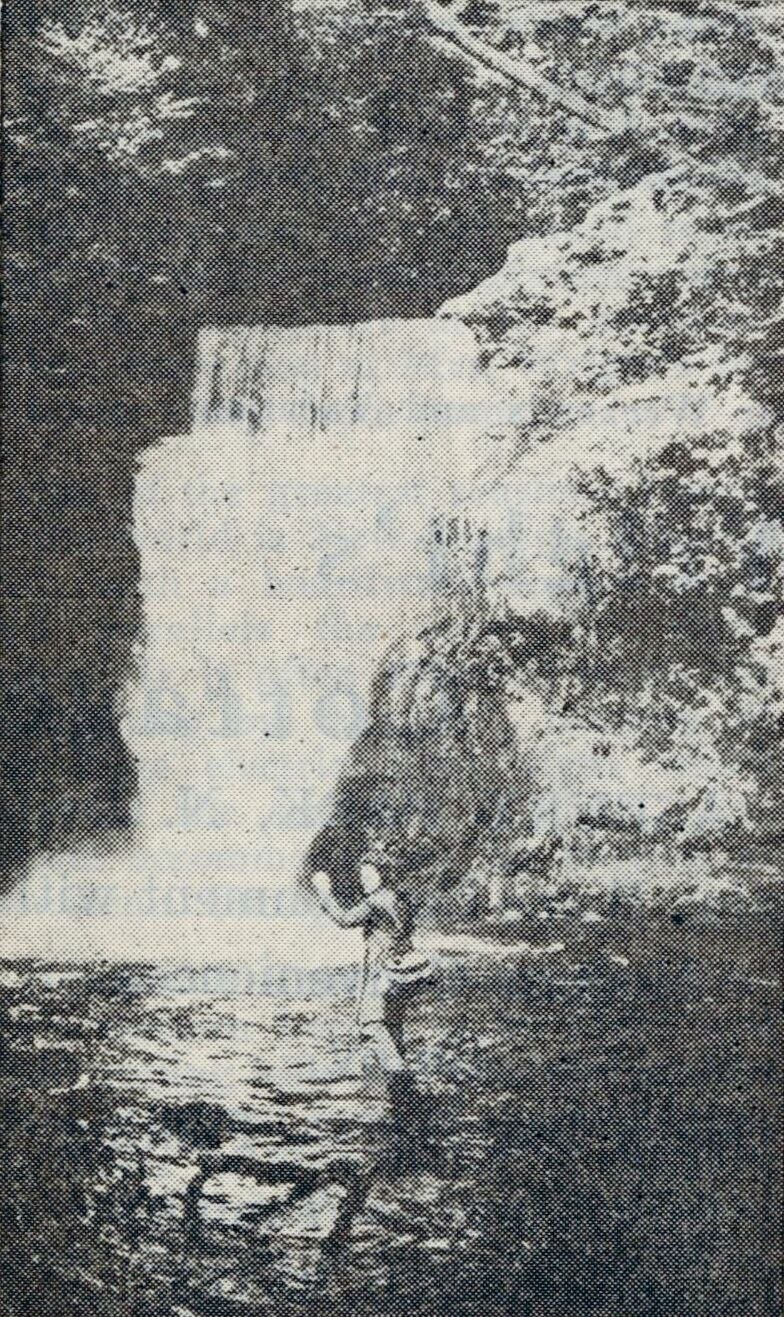
The eponymous falls, as depicted in the 1949 Negro Motorist Green Book

Buck Hill Falls is a private resort community in the Pocono Mountains of Northeastern Pennsylvania.

The settlement was founded in 1901 as a Quaker retreat by a group of Friends from Philadelphia, including Charles F. Jenkins who became and remained the president of the Buck Hill Falls Company until his death in 1951.

The Inn at Buck Hill Falls, originally a small wooden hostelry, expanded ultimately to a large new stone building in 1926 and enjoyed popularity into the 1970s and 1980s. By the time of its closure, the Inn had over 400 guest rooms along with resort amenities, including an indoor swimming pool with a retractable glass roof, several lobby spaces, and a white linen dining room where guests were feted with fine food while occasionally enjoying live harpsichord music. Another feature of the Inn was the north porch, a huge covered stone structure with views of the surrounding Pocono mountains. Guests could take afternoon tea and relax in rocking chairs looking out over the mountains. However, changes in ownership, financial troubles, and several fires led to the closing of the Inn in October 1990. Although there was no single cause of the Inn's failure, the decline in the costs of air travel, allowing vacationers from New York and Philadelphia to avoid the long drive into the Poconos was certainly a major factor in its demise. The Inn property was bought recently.

At Buck Hill Falls Rexford Tugwell, while in charge of the New Deal's Resettlement Administration, conducted a June 1935 conference on the future of housing and resettlement. Stuart Taylor also attended, as did Eleanor Roosevelt, who considered herself to be an observer. "You cannot just build houses and tell people to go and live in them. They must be taught how to live," said Mrs. Roosevelt.

There is still an active community of both summer and year-round residents, many of whom come for a summer retreat from New York City or Philadelphia. Many families have been coming to Buck Hill for generations. The community still has the amenities of its past as a popular Quaker resort, including a 27-hole Donald Ross-designed golf course, 10 tennis courts, 2 lawn bowling greens, and an Olympic-sized swimming pool. The nearby villages of Mountainhome and Canadensis provide places to shop.

Buck Hill Falls is known for its natural environment including its namesake waterfall, the annual Buck Hill Art Association Art Show, and the Foxhowe Association, which sponsors lectures and oversees the Friends meeting for worship in the summer. The Buck Hill Lawn Bowling Association has also hosted National Finals several times. Also, the Buck Hill Conservation Foundation is actively buying easements, and maintaining expansive trails throughout the 4,600 acres (19 km^{2}) of forest surrounding the settlement.

Most recently, Buck Hill Falls (in partnership with neighboring Skytop, PA) became the home of the Buck Hill-Skytop Music Festival, the Poconos' premier classical music venue, featuring Opera, Chamber Music, and Jazz.

In 2000, the Buck Hill Inn was used as a location for MTV's Fear, and several liberties were taken with its history, including claiming that Buck Hill Falls was the site of 73 murders, the suicide of one maid, and one room being built on ley lines, as well as ghost sightings. None of this has been proven to be true, yet the Inn still has rumors of being haunted from the local residents.

In July 2003, The Buck Hill Inn was reported on fire due to arson. Two men were arrested and were both charged with arson, trespassing, burglary, criminal mischief, risking catastrophe, and other offenses. The two men started three fires in the Inn's Library, the main lobby, and a recreational building on the property that spread to a nearby annex. Because of the damage done to the historical Buck Hill Inn, there was great debate whether to demolish the building, or to restore it completely. The Inn was demolished in 2016.
