= Pittsburgh Athletic Association =

- U.S. National Register of Historic Places
- U.S. Historic district – Contributing property
- Pittsburgh Landmark – PHLF
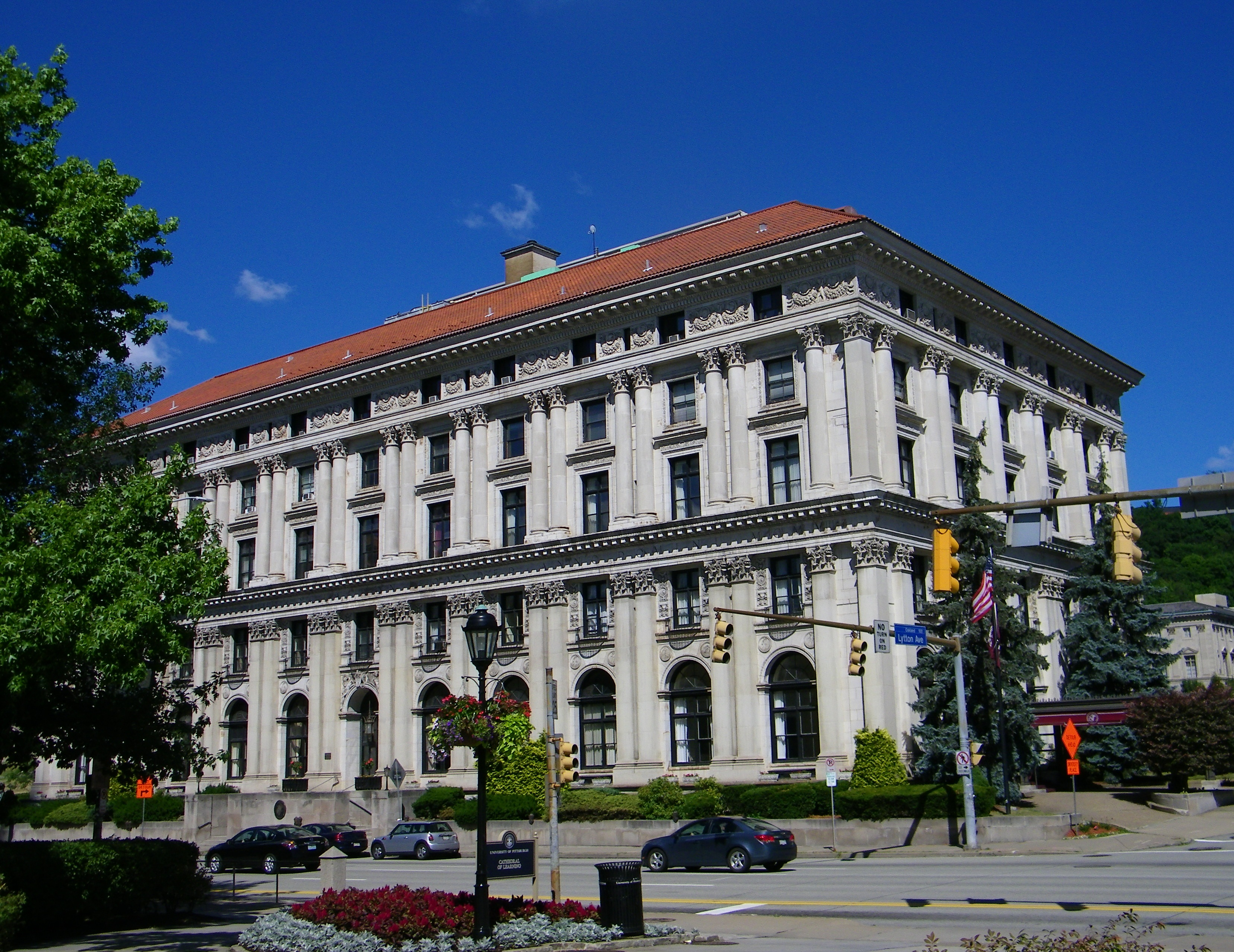
- Pittsburgh Athletic Association at the University of Pittsburgh

- Location within Pittsburgh Location within Pennsylvania Location within the United States
- Location: 4215 5th Ave., Pittsburgh, Pennsylvania
- Coordinates: 40°26′42″N 79°57′17″W
- Area: 0.5 acres (0.20 ha)
- Built: 1909–1911
- Architect: Janssen & Abbott
- Architectural style: Venetian High Renaissance
- Part of: Schenley Farms Historic District (ID83002213)
- NRHP reference No.: 78002338

Significant dates
- Added to NRHP: December 15, 1978
- Designated CP: July 22, 1983
- Designated PHLF: 1970

The Pittsburgh Athletic Association at the University of Pittsburgh is a historic, Benno Janssen designed building located in Pittsburgh, Pennsylvania. Opened as the home of a private social and athletic club of the same name, the building is listed on the National Register of Historic Places.

== Features ==
Completed in 1911, the building is an eight-story, steel frame structure clad in stone and terra cotta in the Venetian High Renaissance style. Architect Benno Janssen used a Venetian Renaissance palace as a prototype for his design, seemingly inspired by the Palazzo Corner della Ca' Grande, Palazzo Grimani di San Luca, and Biblioteca Marciana in Venice, all works of the architect Jacopo Sansovino.

The interior features a lobby with 17-foot-high coffered ceilings adorned with medallions and rosettes, stone walls, and a marble fireplace. Other featured spaces include the Pennsylvania Room, originally a billiards room; the Schenley Lounge, which initially featured multiple works of art; the Oakland Room, originally a ladies' reception room; a dining room with Palladian windows; and an oak-paneled grille room with a fireplace and barrel-vaulted ceilings.

Located at the corner of Fifth Avenue and Bigelow Boulevard in the city's Oakland district, the building faces three other landmark buildings: the University of Pittsburgh's Cathedral of Learning and William Pitt Union (formerly The Schenley Hotel) as well as the Soldiers and Sailors National Military Museum and Memorial. The latter, as well as the nearby Twentieth Century Club, was also designed by Benno Janssen.

== History ==
=== Club ===
The Pittsburgh Athletic Association social club was organized in 1908 by real estate developer Franklin Nicola. Before the opening of the Pittsburgh Athletic Association building, the club operated out of the Farmer's Bank Building (now razed), downtown at Forbes Street (then Diamond) and Smithfield.

The Pittsburgh Athletic Association was a nonprofit membership club that operated until 2017.

It offered comprehensive athletic facilities, sports lessons, spa services, fine dining, and overnight accommodations. Some of the building's more interesting features include a pool on the third floor, full basketball and squash courts, a 16-lane bowling alley, and a room dedicated to former University of Pittsburgh football coach Johnny Majors. The club held several annual events, the most popular of which included an Easter brunch, a lobster dinner, and collegiate boxing events.

From 1916 to 1920, the PAA fielded an elite amateur ice hockey team featuring such Canadian stars as Herb Drury and brothers Joe and Larry McCormick. The team won the championship of the short-lived National Amateur Hockey League in 1918. When the Olympic Games first included ice hockey in 1920, four of the eleven players on the silver medal-winning U.S. team came from the PAA squad.

At its height, it had 2,500 members and was also notable as the place where Fred Rogers conducted daily swims. However, in the 2010s the club was facing declining membership, which had dropped to an estimated 200 to 300 members, and faced financial difficulties resulting in a 2017 bankruptcy filing. The lot behind the building was leased and developed into a 10-story hotel.

=== Sale ===
In 2017, the building was purchased by the Walnut Capital group for $11.9 million. In 2021, Walnut Capital completed $25 million in renovations, including restoration of the exterior and interior spaces. Originally, the Pittsburgh Athletic Association club intended to rent approximately 20,000 square feet of space in the renovated building for its own use, but decided not to occupy any space and instead pursue possible mergers with other Pittsburgh-area social clubs, thus ending the club's affiliation with the building that bears its name. The University of Pittsburgh authorized the purchase the building for $34 million and the university acquired the building in June, 2024.

== In film ==
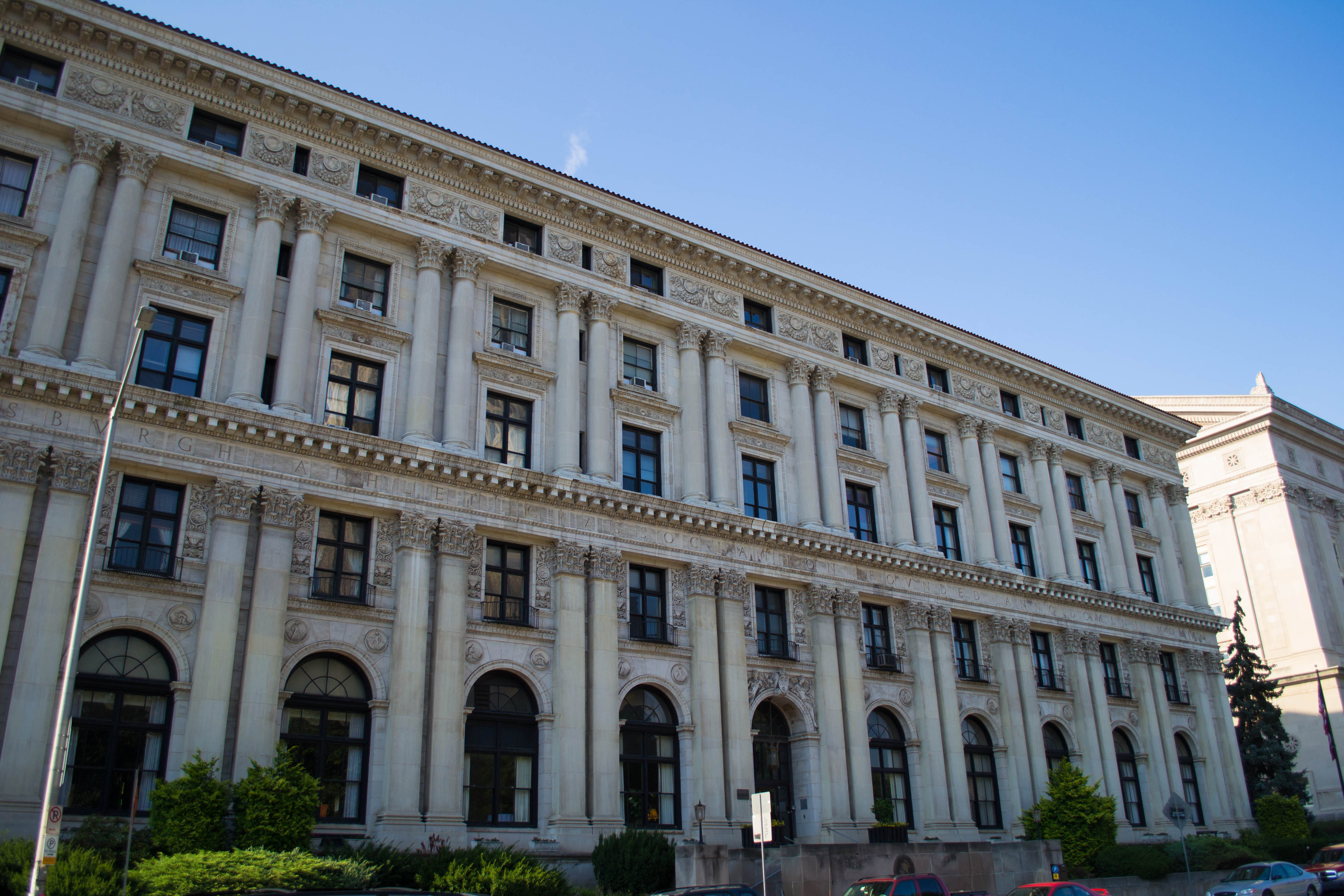
5th Avenue exterior of the Pittsburgh Athletic Association

In 2009, the film Love & Other Drugs, directed by Edward Zwick and starring Jake Gyllenhaal and Hank Azaria, filmed a scene in the Pittsburgh Athletic Association's Grill Room. The 2010 film, She's Out of My League was partly filmed in the bowling alley.

== See also ==
- List of American gentlemen's clubs
- Schenley Farms Historic District

Preceded by Thaw Hall	University of Pittsburgh buildings Pittsburgh Athletic Association; Constructed: 1911	Succeeded by Allegheny Observatory
