= Mellon Institute of Industrial Research =

- Mellon Institute
- U.S. Historic district – Contributing property
- Pittsburgh Landmark – PHLF
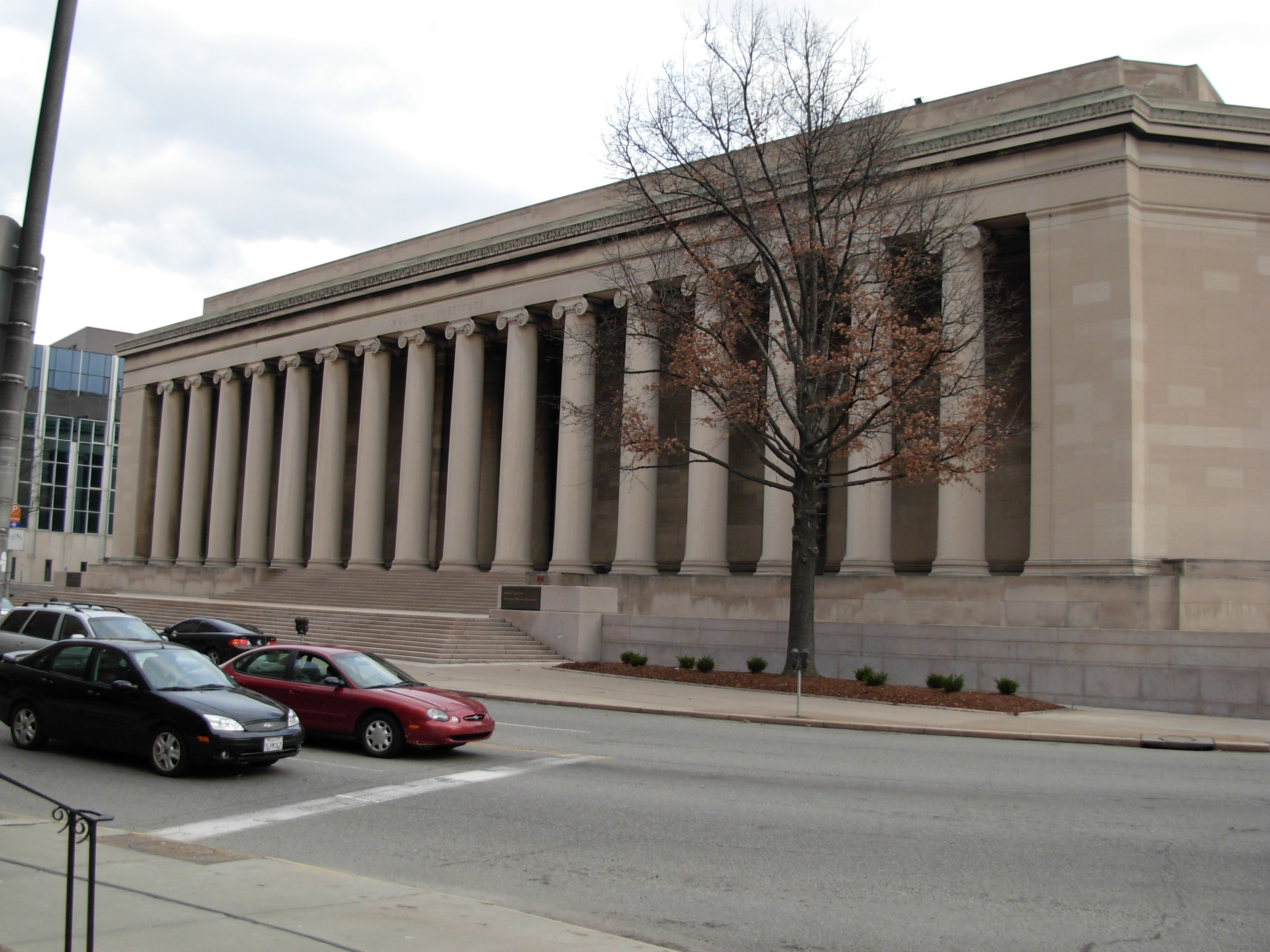
- Coordinates: 40°26′46.04″N 79°57′03.72″W
- Area: Schenley Farms Historic District
- Built: 1937
- Architect: Benno Janssen
- Architectural style: Neoclassical
- Part of: Schenley Farms Historic District (ID83002213)

Significant dates
- Added to NRHP: July 22, 1983
- Designated PHLF: 2003

The Mellon Institute of Industrial Research was a research institute in Pittsburgh, Pennsylvania that became part of Carnegie Mellon University. It was founded in 1913 by Andrew Mellon and Richard B. Mellon as part of the University of Pittsburgh, and was originally located in Allen Hall. After becoming an independent research center and moving to a new building on Fifth Avenue in 1937, the Mellon Institute merged with the Carnegie Institute of Technology in 1967 to form Carnegie Mellon University. While it ceased to exist as a distinct institution, the landmark building bearing its name remains located at the corner of Fifth Avenue and Bellefield Avenue in Oakland, the city's university district. It is sited adjacent to the Carnegie Mellon Software Engineering Institute and the University of Pittsburgh's Bellefield Hall and is across Bellefield Avenue from two other local landmarks: the University of Pittsburgh's Heinz Memorial Chapel and the Cathedral of Learning.

Designed by architect Benno Janssen (1874–1964), the Mellon Institute building has neo-classical architecture and elegant construction, with its signature monolithic limestone columns (the largest monolithic columns in the world). Andrew Mellon, who served as United States Secretary of the Treasury, specified to Janssen a building with a monumental ionic colonnade similar to the Treasury Building in Washington, D.C. The proportions of the Mellon Institute's street facades are nearly those of the long lateral facade of the Parthenon on the Acropolis in Athens, Greece. The Mellon Institute building was completed and dedicated posthumously to the Mellon brothers in May 1937.

The Mellon Institute building houses the Office of the Dean for Carnegie Mellon University's Mellon College of Science, as well as the administrative offices and research laboratories for the Department of Biological Sciences and Department of Chemistry. From 1986 until 2006, it also housed the Pittsburgh Supercomputing Center.

== History ==
The Mellon Institute of Industrial Research was first established as the Department of Industrial Research at the University of Pittsburgh. The first director was Robert Kennedy Duncan who died before the original building was set up in 1914. It conducted research for firms on a contractual basis; a company would contract the institute to solve a specific problem, and the institute would then hire an appropriate scientist to do the research. The results of the research then became the property of the contracting company.

In 1928, the institute was incorporated as a nonprofit, independent research center and planning for a new Mellon Institute building began that same year. When completed in 1937, the institute moved into its new building which sat directly across from the newly completed Cathedral of Learning, and handed its original facility, now known as Allen Hall, back to the University of Pittsburgh.

In 1967, declining use of independent research institutes for the outsourcing of corporate industrial research led Mellon Institute to merge with the Carnegie Institute of Technology to form Carnegie Mellon University. The "Carnegie Institute of Technology" name was retained to refer to the engineering portion of Carnegie Mellon's "College of Engineering and Science".

In 2013, the American Chemical Society recognized the Mellon Institute as a National Historic Chemical Landmark for its contributions to industrial research and training from its inception in 1913 until its merger with the Carnegie Institute of Technology. Researchers at the Mellon Institute had contributed more than 4,700 papers, 1,600 patents, and other research products, including George O. Curme, Jr.'s discovery of a method for producing acetylene from petroleum that resulted in the production of ethylene and research in organosilicones and the resulting establishment of the Dow Corning Corporation.

For decades, the columns of the Mellon Institute building have served as a popular background for photographers shooting Pittsburgh wedding parties.

== Fictional portrayals ==
- Exterior shots of the Mellon Institute were used to portray the fictitious Tanner Museum in the series premiere of the short-lived 2006 CBS television drama Smith starring Ray Liotta and Amy Smart.
- The 1990 film Citizen Cohn starring James Woods used the exterior to depict 1960s-era Washington, D.C.
- The 1992 film Hoffa starring Danny DeVito and Jack Nicholson filmed on location to depict Federal Courthouses and other government buildings.
- The 1992 film Lorenzo's Oil shows an interior shot of a lecture hall in Mellon Institute.
- The 2002 film The Mothman Prophecies starring Richard Gere depicted the building as a fictional institute for paranormal studies in Chicago.
- The 2012 film The Dark Knight Rises starring Christian Bale filmed on location to depict "Gotham City Hall".
