= Cardiac Hill =

Cardiac Hill may refer to:

- A hill in Atlanta along the course of the Peachtree Road Race
- A hill in Kerry, Ireland, along the trail to the Torc Waterfall
- A hill on the University of Pittsburgh campus adjacent to Lothrop Hall
- A hill in California's Auburn State Recreation Area
- A hill in Long Island NY’s cross country course Sunken Meadow
- A hill leading up to the Dorms on USC Campus in Maracas St Joseph Trinidad, Trinidad and Tobago University of the Southern Caribbean
- A road in Silang, Cavite connecting Westgrove and South Forbes
