= University of Pittsburgh School of Medicine =

Medical school in Pittsburgh, Pennsylvania, US

Coordinates: 40.443111°N 79.961343°W

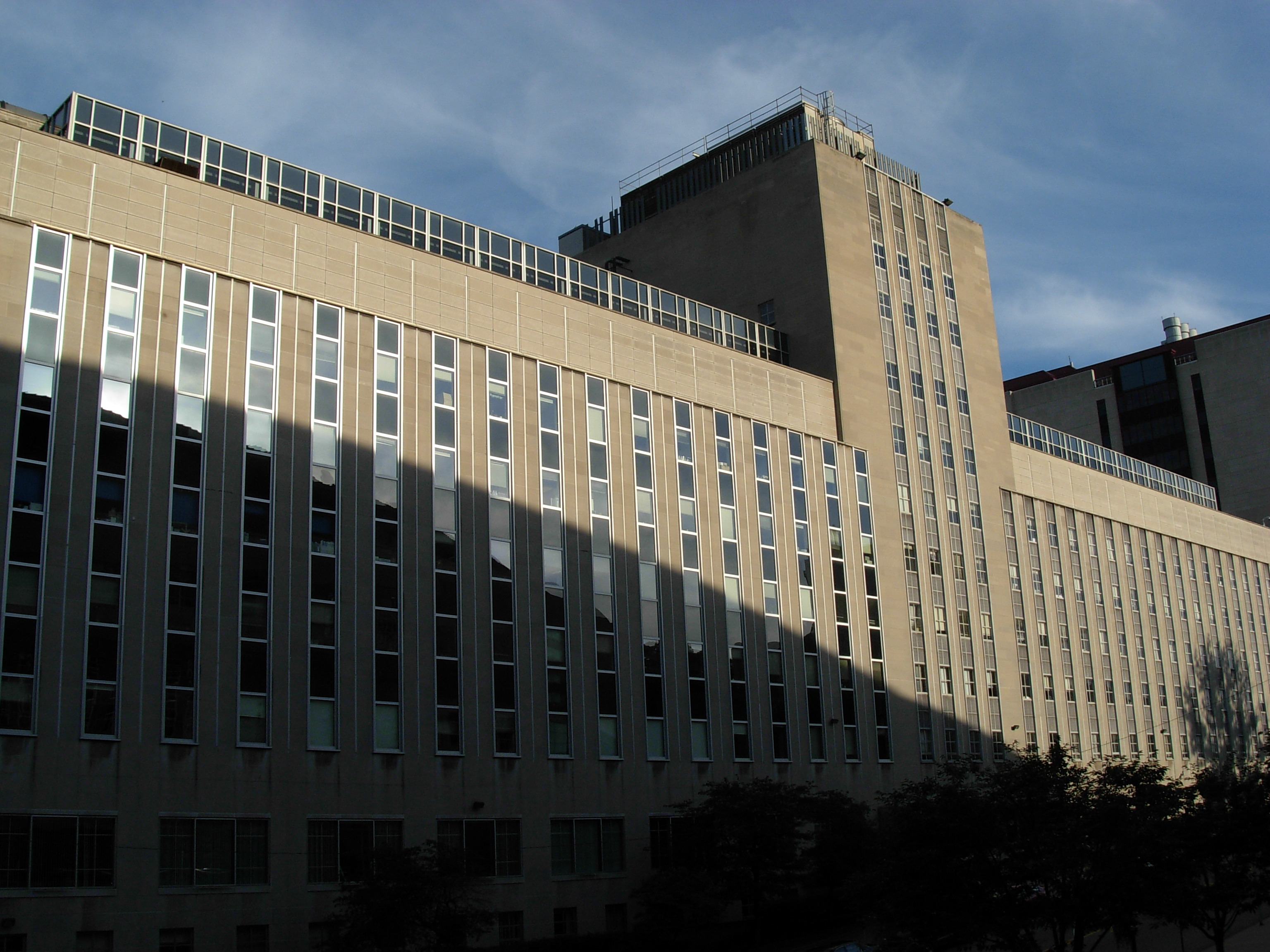
- Scaife Hall, home of the Pitt School of Medicine.
- Type: State-related
- Established: June 4, 1883; 143 years ago
- Dean: Anantha Shekhar, MD, PhD
- Academic staff: 2,264
- Location: Pittsburgh, Pennsylvania, United States
- Campus: Urban
- MD Students: 591
- Website: http://www.medschool.pitt.edu/

The University of Pittsburgh School of Medicine is a medical school of the University of Pittsburgh, located in Pittsburgh, Pennsylvania. The School of Medicine, also known as Pitt Med, encompasses both a medical program, offering the doctor of medicine, and graduate programs, offering doctor of philosophy and master's degrees in several areas of biomedical science, clinical research, medical education, and medical informatics.

In 2023, Pitt Med had an incoming class profile with a median score of 514 on the MCAT with a median GPA of 3.79; 8,782 people applied, and 1,020 were interviewed for 148 positions in the medical school's entering class.

The School of Medicine is closely affiliated with the University of Pittsburgh Medical Center (UPMC).

The School of Medicine is one of sixteen schools that comprise the University of Pittsburgh and is located in the Oakland neighborhood of the city of Pittsburgh.

== History ==
Chartered on June 4, 1883, as the Western Pennsylvania Medical College, the school opened with a class of 57 students in September 1886. Originally a free-standing school formed by local physicians, the college founders had sought affiliation with the Western University of Pennsylvania even prior to its founding, and in 1892, the school became affiliated with the university becoming the Medical Department of Western University. By 1895 the college had begun a four-year course of study, and in 1908 the college was completely integrated into the Western University of Pennsylvania, the same year the university was renamed to the University of Pittsburgh. Abraham Flexner, a renowned educator, published his first report, Medical Education in the U.S. and Canada, in 1910 after he had visited 155 medical schools, including the University of Pittsburgh School of Medicine.

For the next four decades, the school continued to evolve. At the end of World War II, active planning for a major change was initiated with the encouragement and assistance of the Mellons, a prominent Pittsburgh family. The university accepted the University Health Center concept and, in 1953, appointed the first vice chancellor of the Schools of the Health Professions. Plans were made to house the Schools of Medicine, Dental Medicine, Nursing, and Pharmacy in a new building contiguous to the principal teaching hospitals and the Graduate School of Public Health.

To generate the necessary capital, the university planned a fund drive to raise an endowment. A handsome beginning was made when, by mid-December 1953, $15 million was assured by grants of $5 million each from the A. W. Mellon Educational and Charitable Trust, the Richard King Mellon Foundation, and the Sarah Mellon Scaife Foundation.

The new building, Scaife Hall, was completed in 1956, and recruitment of additional full-time faculty was begun. With increased facilities and faculty, the School of Medicine began to be recognized as a major center for research in a number of areas. In turn, the faculty of the School of Medicine attracted appreciable support for research and training from the National Institutes of Health and other federal agencies. Moreover, the school became assured of financial support for medical education when, in 1967, the university became state related as part of the higher education system of the Commonwealth of Pennsylvania.

=== Departments ===
The School of Medicine has the following 31 departments:

- Anesthesiology
- Biomedical Informatics
- Cardiothoracic Surgery
- Cell Biology
- Computational & Systems Biology
- Critical Care Medicine
- Dermatology
- Developmental Biology
- Emergency Medicine
- Family Medicine
- Immunology
- Medicine
- Microbiology and Molecular Genetics
- Neurobiology
- Neurological Surgery
- Neurology
- Obstetrics, Gynecology and Reproductive Sciences
- Ophthalmology
- Orthopaedic Surgery
- Otolaryngology
- Pathology
- Pediatrics
- Pharmacology and Chemical Biology
- Physical Medicine and Rehabilitation
- Plastic Surgery
- Psychiatry
- Radiation Oncology
- Radiology
- Structural Biology
- Surgery
- Urology

== Doctor of Medicine Program ==
The University of Pittsburgh School of Medicine is accredited by the Liaison Council on Medical Education. The residency programs of the medical school are accredited by the Accreditation Council for Graduate Medical Education.

The doctor of medicine program is a full-time four-year program that provides a general professional education that prepares students to pursue any career option in medicine. The University of Pittsburgh School of Medicine curricular infrastructure combines a lecture-and problem-based curriculum with early and in-depth clinical experiences and an integrated organ systems approach to the pre-clinical sciences. The clinical years are characterized by an integrated clerkship structure and an emphasis on student flexibility. Key subject matter is longitudinally integrated throughout the curriculum, building upon a foundation of prior learning while providing a level-appropriate and well-synchronized introduction of new content.

Scheduled instructional time in the first two years of the curriculum is apportioned approximately as one-third lecture; one-third small group learning (much of which is problem-based learning; the remainder includes demonstrations, faculty-directed problem-solving exercises, skill-practice sessions, and other activities); and one-third activities (which includes observation of and appropriate participation in patient care, community-site visits, experience with standardized patients, high-fidelity simulations, laboratory exercises, and other activities).

Patient focus in the curriculum begins on day one, in the introduction to being a physician course. Students interview patients about their experience of illness and experiences with their physicians, and they visit community settings to develop an understanding of their roles as medical professionals. Medical interviewing and physical examination courses follow, along with exercises examining the many facets of physician life—in society, ethical settings, and at the patient bedside. Throughout the first two years, students apply their new skills in local practices and hospitals one afternoon per week. The basic science block runs through three-fourths of the first year and provides language and concepts that underlie the scientific basis of medical practice. Organ system block courses integrate physiology, pathophysiology, pharmacology, and patient with concurrent courses in patient care and patient, physician and society blocks. Weekly discussions, patient interviews, and examination of hospitalized patients reinforce essential clinical skills.

The third-year curriculum consists of seven required clerkships. They are designed to optimize the balance between out-of-hospital and in-patient learning opportunities, eliminate unintentional curriculum redundancy, and optimize opportunities for student-designed curricula in the junior and senior years.

Every student engages in a mentored scholarly project conducted longitudinally throughout the four-year curriculum. Completion and presentation of the scholarly project is due in the spring of the senior year and is a requirement for graduation. Students pursue their projects through several program options, which may include areas of concentration. Students can focus on more traditional laboratory-based or clinical research projects or can conduct research in less common areas such as health policy, epidemiology, and comparative effectiveness research. An innovative system of Web-based learning portfolios facilitates learner-mentor communication and enriches the possibilities for collaboration within and beyond the university. The Scholarly Project immerses students in scientific investigation to foster data collection, hypothesis-development, and research skills that are critical to the practice of clinical medicine.

The medical school maintains the curriculum online via the Navigator system, a family of Web-based applications with domain-specific courseware to support student achievement of course objectives. Students have access to various online resources such as digitized images, syllabi, practice quizzes, podcasts, and other material associated with specific instructional units.

=== MD/PhD Program ===
The MD/PhD Program, established in 1983 and funded partly by the NIH Medical Scientist Training Program, is a collaborative training program involving the University of Pittsburgh and Carnegie Mellon University. The program serves as a bridge between the medical curriculum and a large number of graduate programs at the two universities. Students enrolled in the program complete the entire medical school curriculum as well as the curriculum of a field of study for the PhD degree. Graduates receive a dual degree. The program takes advantage of the highly developed curricula of the medical and graduate programs as well as the large depth and breadth of research available at the two universities. MD/PhD students typically complete the first two years of medical school before entering a program leading to the PhD degree. The students then enter a track in a selected field of study. Students choose from the basic sciences at the School of Medicine, School of Engineering, Graduate School of Public Health, Faculty of Arts and Sciences and similar programs at Carnegie Mellon University. The estimated time to complete the entire dual degree program is 7.6 years, ranging from six to ten years.

== Rankings and reputation ==
It was ranked 13th in the category of research and 14th in primary care by U.S. News for 2020 and is separately ranked 17th in the Academic Ranking of World Universities list of best medical schools in the world.

In an analysis of National Institutes of Health funding for the federal fiscal year 2016, the faculty of the University of Pittsburgh ranked fifth in total grants awarded, with more than $513 million in funding—approximately 90 percent of which went to the School of Medicine.

UPMC is considered a leading American healthcare provider, as its flagship facilities have ranked in the U.S. News & World Report "Honor Roll" of the approximately 15 to 20 best hospitals in America for over a decade. In 2017, for the 18th time in recent years, UPMC appears on the U.S. News & World Report Honor Roll of America's Best Hospitals. UPMC Presbyterian Shadyside ranked 14th overall, making it the highest-ranked medical center in Pittsburgh, and was one of the only 20 hospitals nationwide that made the Honor Roll of the “nation’s best” in the 2017's survey. Nationally, UPMC is recognized for excellence in 14 of 16 specialty areas and is among the top 10 hospitals in three specialties: diabetes and endocrinology, gastroenterology and GI surgery, and pulmonology. UPMC Children's Hospital of Pittsburgh is ranked ninth overall and ranked in all 10 of 10 pediatric specialties included in the magazine's survey, four of which were ranked in the top 10.

== Graduate programs ==
The School of Medicine offers a variety of programs leading to the Doctor of Philosophy, the Master of Science, or a certificate. As of the fall of 2017, there are 273 registrants in PhD programs (including those in the medical scientist training program), 87 students in MS programs, and 27 students in certificate programs. The school works with other schools of the university through collaborative graduate programs. The School of Medicine offers a joint MD/PhD program.

=== Doctoral programs ===
The medical school offers PhDs through the Interdisciplinary Biomedical Graduate Program, the Center for Neuroscience Graduate Training Program, the Biomedical Informatics Training Program, the Joint Program in Computation Biology, the Molecular Biophysics and Structural Biology Graduate Program, the Integrative Systems Biology Program, and the program in Clinical and Translational Science.

Pitt's Institute for Clinical Research Education also offers MS certificates in clinical research and medical education, as well as a certificate in comparative effectiveness research.

==== Interdisciplinary Biomedical Science Graduate Program ====
The Interdisciplinary Biomedical Science Graduate Program includes students in the School of Arts and Sciences. Its programs include:

- Biochemistry and Molecular Genetics
- Cell biology and Molecular physiology
- Cellular and Molecular pathology
- Immunology
- Molecular pharmacology
- Molecular virology and Microbiology

==== Center for Neuroscience Graduate Training Program ====
The CNUP graduate program introduces students to the fundamental issues and experimental approaches in neuroscience and trains them in the theory and practice of laboratory research.

==== Biomedical Informatics Training Program ====
The Pittsburgh Biomedical Informatics Training Program, in the Department of Biomedical Informatics, provides an interdisciplinary education in the effective use of biomedical data, information, and knowledge by applying artificial intelligence, statistical methods, decision science, and other computational approaches to transform complex data into actionable insights that enhance healthcare and biomedical research. The program offers doctoral and master’s degrees in biomedical informatics. Specific concentrations of study include clinical informatics, clinical research informatics, bioinformatics, health services research, and public health informatics. The program is actively involved in the Medical Scientist Training Program (MSTP) and the Physician-Scientist Training Program (PSTP), both of which are specialized, research-intensive MD pathways. Additionally, the program offers M.S. training to clinicians and has trained 15 MDs, 3 DDSs, and 1 PharmD since 2006. A certificate program is also available to serve students with diverse goals and backgrounds. The program also offers non-degree postdoctoral fellowships (for applicants with a doctoral degree in the health sciences) designed to provide two years of full-time fellowship training.

==== Clinical and Translational Science ====
This program is offered through Pitt's Institute for Clinical Research Education and is a rigorous, multidisciplinary program designed to train an elite group of scientists in conducting high quality clinical and translation research. A certificate is also available to students enrolled in other health science doctoral programs.

==== Computational Biology ====
The joint PhD program in Computational Biology represents an exciting collaborative program offered by the University of Pittsburgh and Carnegie Mellon University.

==== Integrative Systems Biology Program ====
The goal of the Integrative Systems Biology Program (PhD) is to train students in emerging transformative methodologies that emphasize genomics, proteomics, complex cellular pathways, and the dynamics of cellular and organismal function. Students in this program operate at the exciting interface between basic bench-top biology, computational analysis of big data sets, and the emergence of 21st century clinical translation.

==== Molecular Biophysics and Structural Biology Graduate Program ====
An interdisciplinary program that trains students in the use of a broad range of technologies to study the physical function of biological macromolecules and covers a diversity of research topics in molecular biophysics and structural biology.

== Admissions ==
=== General requirements ===
The medical school participates in the American Medical College Application Service (AMCAS) of the Association of American Medical Colleges (AAMC). The school considers currently enrolled students and graduates of accredited colleges for admission. Non United States citizens must hold a permanent resident visa (not conditional) or refugee/asylee status and have completed at least one full year of undergraduate education, including prerequisites, in the United States.

In examining candidacy, the admissions committee will consider: 1) Undergraduate, post baccalaureate, and graduate records, 2) MCAT scores, 3) Independent and advanced study, 4) Research, 5) Work experience, 6) Extracurricular activities, including depth and breadth of interests and activities outside the classroom, volunteer activities, community service, student government, hobbies, clubs, athletics, 7) Academic and personal recommendations, 8) Personal character: integrity, communication skills, leadership, motivation, creativity, 9) Supplemental essays and 10) Personal interviews

=== Academic requirements ===
In addition to thorough preparation in the basic sciences, applicants should have a strong liberal arts education with demonstrated accomplishment in the humanities and social sciences. A strong background in mathematics is highly recommended. Acceptance of courses taken at foreign universities is determined on an individual basis at the discretion of the dean of admissions and financial aid. Applicants should have completed most premedical requirements to receive serious consideration. All requirements must be met before matriculation.

Specific minimum course requirements (One year each of) include Biology, exclusive of botany (with lab), General or inorganic chemistry (with lab), Organic chemistry (with lab), Physics (with lab), and English (including W courses taken outside of the English department).

The school will accept AP credit if credit was awarded by college/university and the course credit granted appears on a transcript.

== Faculty ==
As of the fall of 2017, the School of Medicine had 2,264 regular faculty and 2,113 volunteer faculty members. In addition to eight emeritus members, 81 faculty from throughout the school are active members of the Academy of Master Educators, which was developed to recognize and reward excellence in medical education.

== Students and student life ==
As of fall 2017, the School of Medicine has 591 MD students: 300 men and 291 women. Underrepresented minority students make up approximately 16 percent of the medical student body.

The structure of the curriculum promotes student interaction and collegiality. In addition, medical students get to know each other through involvement in organizations and extracurricular activities. Some of the many student groups on campus are the American Medical Student Association, the American Medical Association, specialty interest groups in most areas of medicine, Pitt Women in Medicine, and the C.F. Reynolds Medical History Society. Medical students have access to all facilities of the University of Pittsburgh, including athletic facilities.

== Research ==
The University of Pittsburgh School of Medicine is a leading center for medical research. Of the medical schools and research institutions that receive funding from the National Institutes of Health, the faculty of the School of Medicine ranks fifth in total funding received for the fiscal year 2016, with $453 million in total funding. Some of the major aims of the School of Medicine's research include monitoring gene expression and its consequences on a cell, in vivo, and on a molecular scale using nuclear magnetic resonance. A focus on translational research – moving recent biomedical research from the laboratory into mainstream clinical practice – is also emphasized. Areas of concentration include genome stability and tumorigenesis; regenerative medicine and biomedical device development; vascular, developmental, structural, and computational and systems biology; comparative effectiveness research; immunology and immunological approaches to cancer; and cancer virology. The school is also heavily involved with the advancement and orchestration of clinical research and clinical trials.

== Resources ==
The Health Sciences Library System (HSLS) supports the educational, research, clinical, and service activities of the health sciences community of the University of Pittsburgh and the University of Pittsburgh Medical Center (UPMC) through development and provision of innovative information resources and services. The Health Library System serves as a regional medical library for the Middle Atlantic region of the National Network of Libraries of Medicine, which makes it one of only eight institutions in the nation serving as a regional medical library for the United States National Library of Medicine.

Falk Library of Health Sciences serves as the flagship of the HSLS, with a wide-ranging collection of biomedical and health-related journals and monographs, as well as a specialized collection of rare and historical materials. The HSLS staff includes 25.75 FTE faculty librarians and 23.6 FTE paraprofessional and technical staff. The HSLS serves more than 55,000 primary clients, including health sciences faculty, staff, students, residents, and employees of UPMC hospitals.

PittMed magazine is the school's quarterly magazine, produced by the Office of University Communications. It has been in publication since 2000. PittMed highlights the current research at the School of Medicine and showcases the achievements of its doctors and alumni. Each issue contains several feature stories, brief informative clips, and an alumni news section. PittMed is free and available to all School of Medicine students and alumni, as well as anyone who requests a copy or subscription.

== Scaife Hall ==
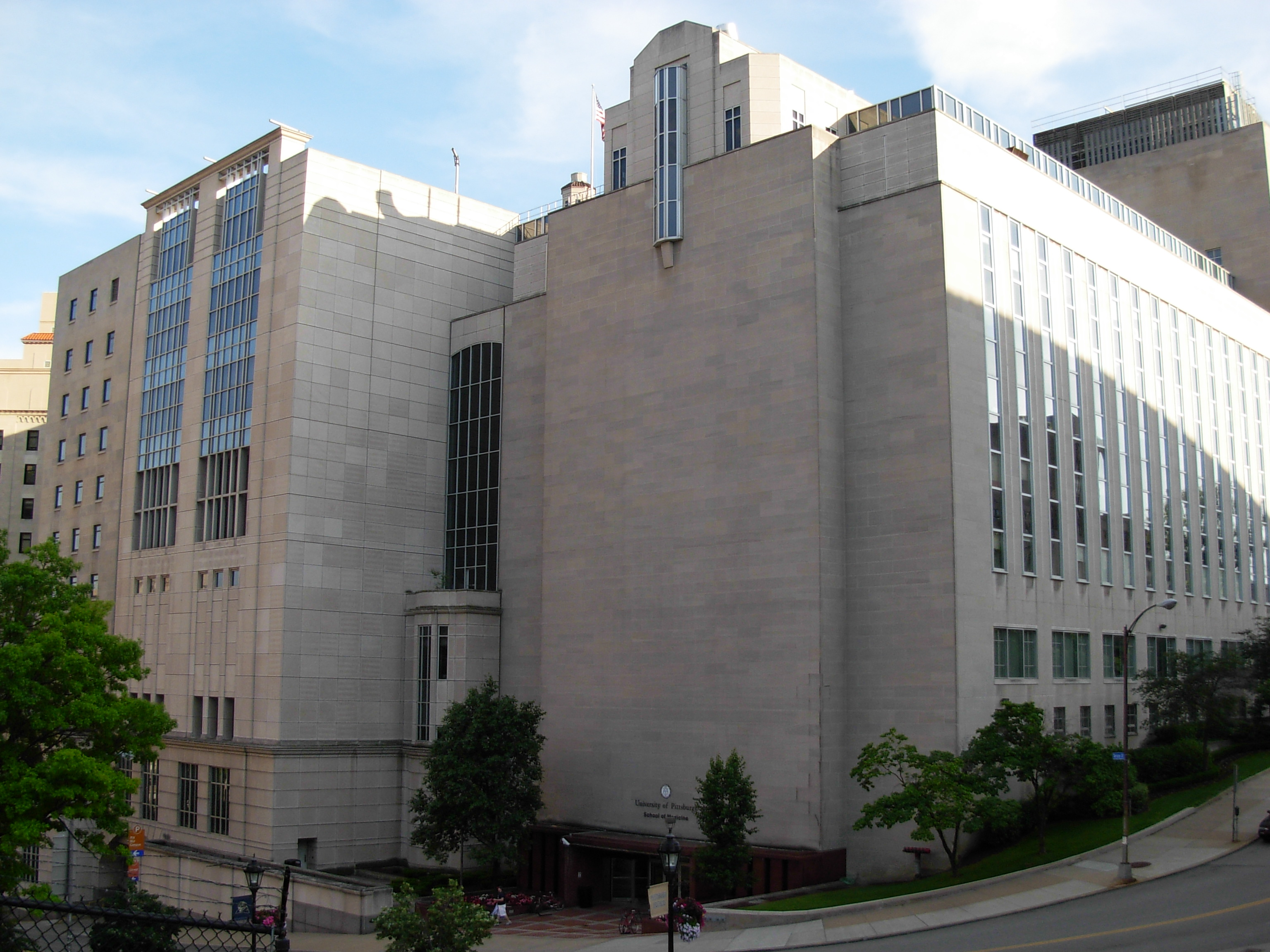
Scaife Hall

Originally residing in Pennsylvania Hall and Allen Hall, ground was broken on a new School of Medicine building on June 28, 1954 and it opened in 1956. Construction of the building, designed by the architectural firm Schmidt, Garden and Erickson, was interrupted by a fire in June, 1955 that destroyed girders and concrete work. The School of Medicine began relocating to the facility from Pennsylvania and Allen halls in the fall of 1955. The ten-story structure's original construction costs were $15 million ($180.3 million today). By 1958, the building received its current moniker in honor of one of the school's primary benefactors. The building is attached to UPMC Presbyterian Hospital and contains classrooms, lecture halls, laboratories, and the Falk Library of the Health Sciences. In 2023, seven-story addition to the west wing of Scaife Hall was completed.

Preceded by Old Engineering Hall	University of Pittsburgh buildings Scaife Hall; Constructed: 1954-1956	Succeeded by Clapp Hall

== See also ==
- Medical schools in Pennsylvania
