= Cancer Chemotherapy and Pharmacology =

- Discipline: Pharmacology, oncology
- Language: English
- Edited by: Jan Hendrik Beumer and Étienne Chatelut

Publication details
- History: 1978-present
- Publisher: Springer Science+Business Media (Germany)
- Frequency: Monthly
- Impact factor: 3.333 (2020)

Standard abbreviations
- ISO 4: Cancer Chemother. Pharmacol.

Indexing
- CODEN: CCPHDZ
- ISSN: 0344-5704 (print); 1432-0843 (web)
- OCLC no.: 04084336

Links
- Journal homepage

Cancer Chemotherapy and Pharmacology is a peer-reviewed medical journal covering oncological pharmacotherapy. It was established in 1978 and is published by Springer Science+Business Media. The editors-in-chief are Jan Hendrik Beumer (University of Pittsburgh School of Pharmacy) and Étienne Chatelut (Institut Claudius-Regaud). According to the Journal Citation Reports, the journal has a 2020 impact factor of 3.333.
