= Old Engineering Hall =

Building in Pennsylvania, United States

Coordinates: 40.444959°N 79.958045°W

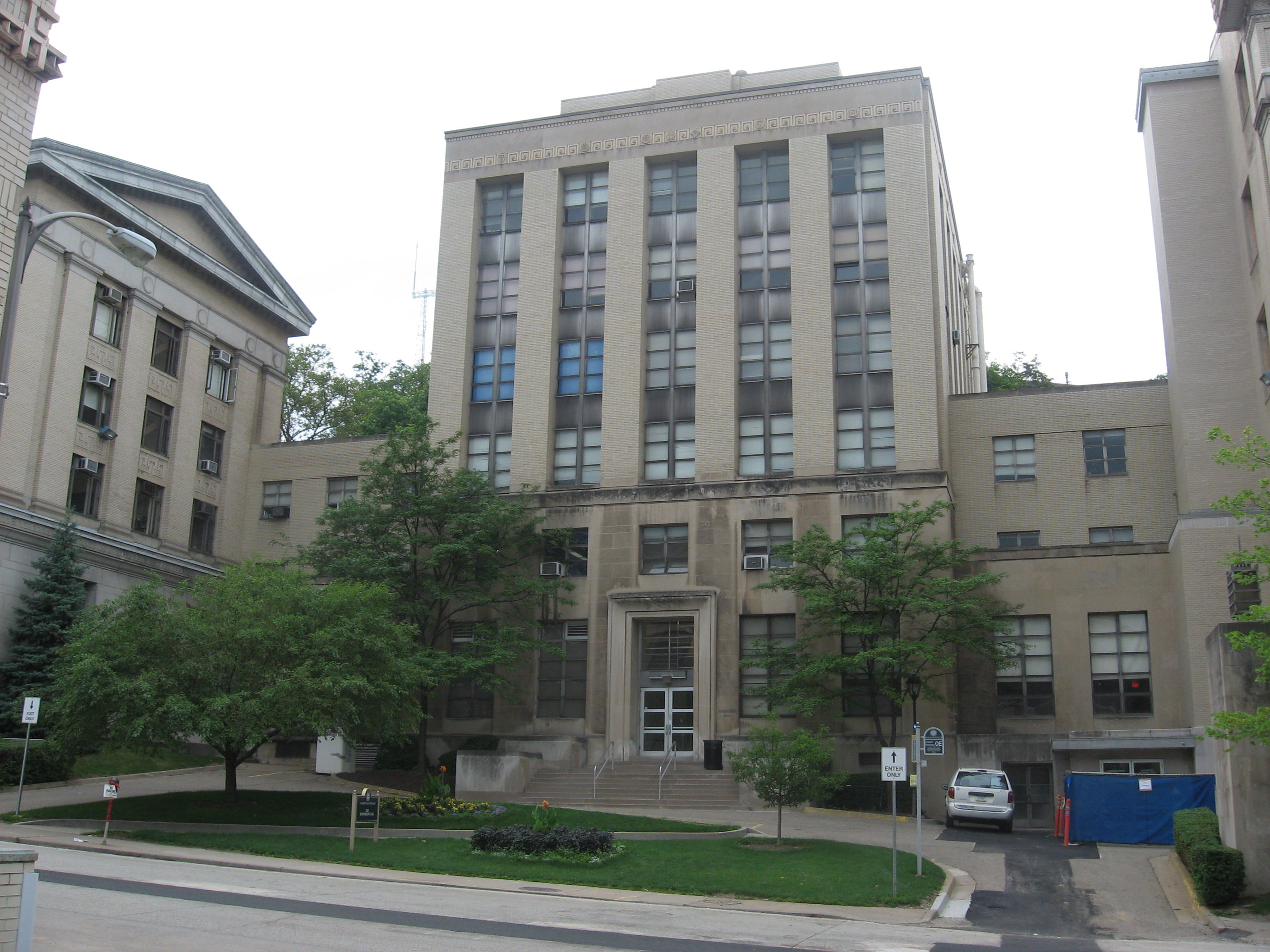
Old Engineering Hall at the University of Pittsburgh sits between Allen Hall and Thaw Hall.

Old Engineering Hall is an academic building at 3943 O'Hara Street on the campus of the University of Pittsburgh in Pittsburgh, Pennsylvania, United States. The building was completed for $1.2 million($14.4 million today) in October, 1955. The seven floor building connects Allen Hall and Thaw Hall, as well as the Van de Graaff Building which was added later. The frieze around the top of the building includes bas-relief of the insignia of several engineering societies. Originally called Engineering Hall, it initially contained engineering offices, classrooms, laboratories, a library, and in the basement, a wind tunnel for the aeronautical engineering department testing of airfoil surfaces.

When the School of Engineering moved into Benedum Hall in 1971, it began to house a variety of psychology and other labs, as well as Art and Sciences instruction labs on the 3rd floor, and the Department of East Asian Languages and Literatures.

Renovations, upgrades, and improvements for Old Engineering Hall, Allen Hall, and Thaw Hall, have been announced and preliminarily targeted in to be in excess of $58.6 million according to the university's 12-year facilities master plan. A new set of physics labs was completed in 2009 on the second floor of OEH, replacing the former Physics and Geology Library; its collection was merged into the engineering library across the street in Benedum Hall. In 2010, it was announced that $28.2 million was allocated to proceed with the creation and renovation of 13 Department of Astronomy and Physics laboratories located in Allen Hall, Old Engineering Hall, and the Van de Graaff Building. Renovations of the basement, 2nd and 3rd floors were completed in 2012; renovation of the 1st floor began in June 2015.

== Van de Graaff Building ==
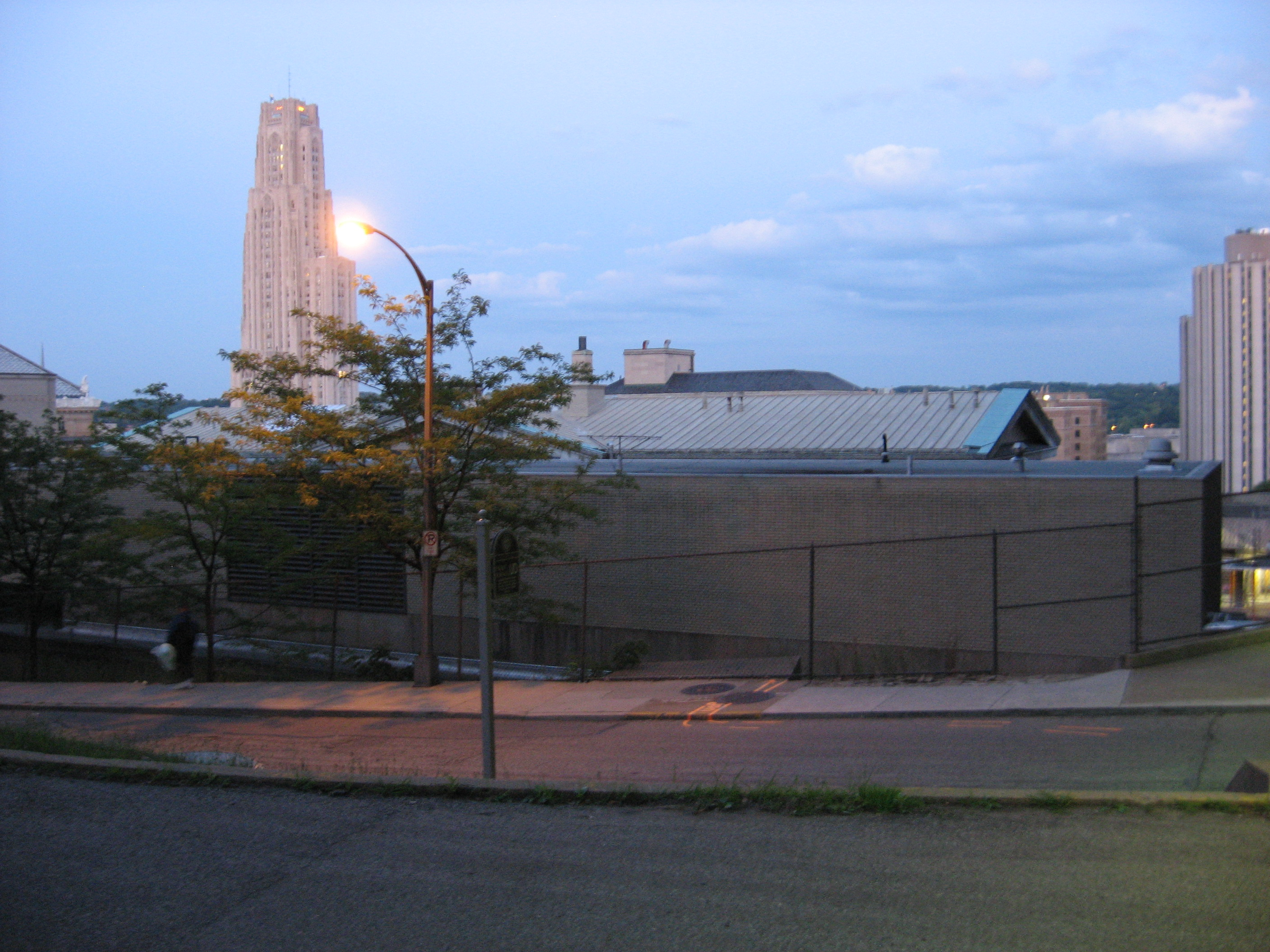
The back of the Van de Graaff Building as seen from University Drive. The Cathedral of Learning can be seen looming in the distance on the left.

The Van de Graaff Building, also known as the Nuclear Physics Laboratory, is an annex built in 1964 behind and connected to Old Engineering Hall in order to house the world's first 3-stage Van de Graaff accelerator obtained by the university's Nuclear Physics Laboratory. The accelerator, which had numerous advantages over existing cyclotrons of the time, was financed with a $1.65 million grant from the National Science Foundation and a $1 million gift for the building construction obtained from the Sarah Mellon-Scaife foundation. The building construction and accelerator installation and operation were directed by Jim McGruer. The first beams from the accelerator were obtained in 1965. In November 2008, Pitt approved $6.1 million for upgrading labs and infrastructure in nanoscience research in the Van de Graaff Building. Work on the second floor and roof were completed in 2009. Work on the mid-campus backup generator, housed in 'the shoe' of the building (so called because it is a two-story right angle projection from the freestanding end of the building) was completed in early 2010. Further renovations to the first, second, and third floors utilizing funding obtained from the American Recovery and Reinvestment Act of 2009 were completed in 2012. A large, vibration isolated cleanroom was added on the first floor, while the entire third floor and most of the second were completely redone internally. An added annex, containing a student machine shop and a helium recycling system, was completed in 2015.

External signage refers to the building as "Nuclear Physics Laboratory", and rooms are labeled with and referred to by the "NPL" prefix by many university personnel and departments. Pitt's official campus maps, and several internal departments, still list the building as the 'Van de Graaff Building', which is often a source of confusion, both for visitors and internally.

| Preceded by Lothrop Hall | University of Pittsburgh buildings Old Engineering Hall; Constructed: 1954-1955 | Succeeded by Scaife Hall |
