= Allen Hall (University of Pittsburgh) =

- U.S. Historic district – Contributing property
- Pittsburgh Landmark – PHLF
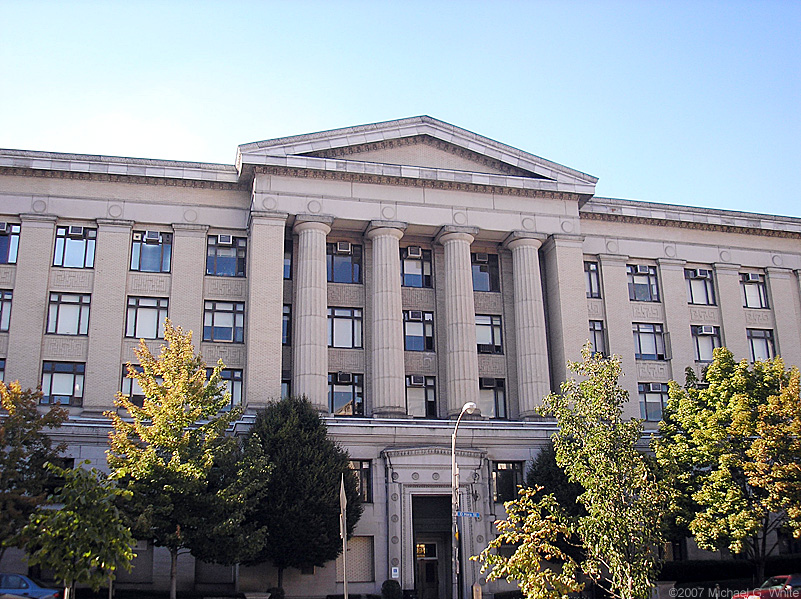
- Allen Hall at the University of Pittsburgh
- Location: Pittsburgh, Pennsylvania, US
- Coordinates: 40°26′40.52″N 79°57′29.98″W
- Built: 1913–1915
- Architect: J. H. Giesey
- Architectural style: Greek Revival
- Part of: Schenley Farms Historic District (ID83002213)

Significant dates
- Added to NRHP: July 22, 1983
- Designated PHLF: 1972

Allen Hall at the University of Pittsburgh is a Pittsburgh History and Landmarks Foundation Historic Landmark and a contributing property to the Schenley Farms National Historic District. Completed in 1914 and originally serving as the home to the Mellon Institute of Industrial Research, the six-story Greek Revival building designed by J. H. Giesey now serves as the home of the university's Department of Physics and Astronomy.

== History ==
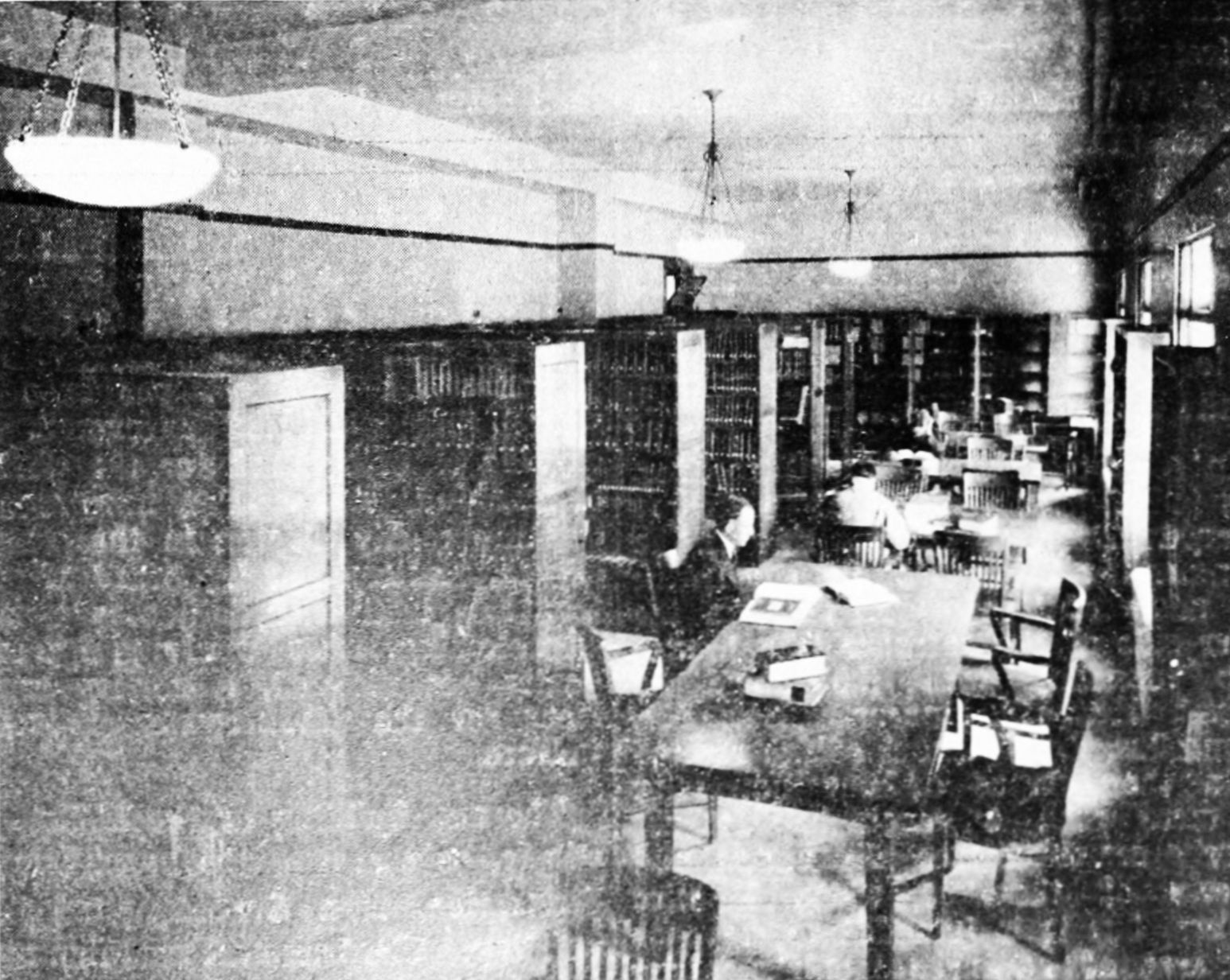
The original library of the Mellon Institute on the building's first floor

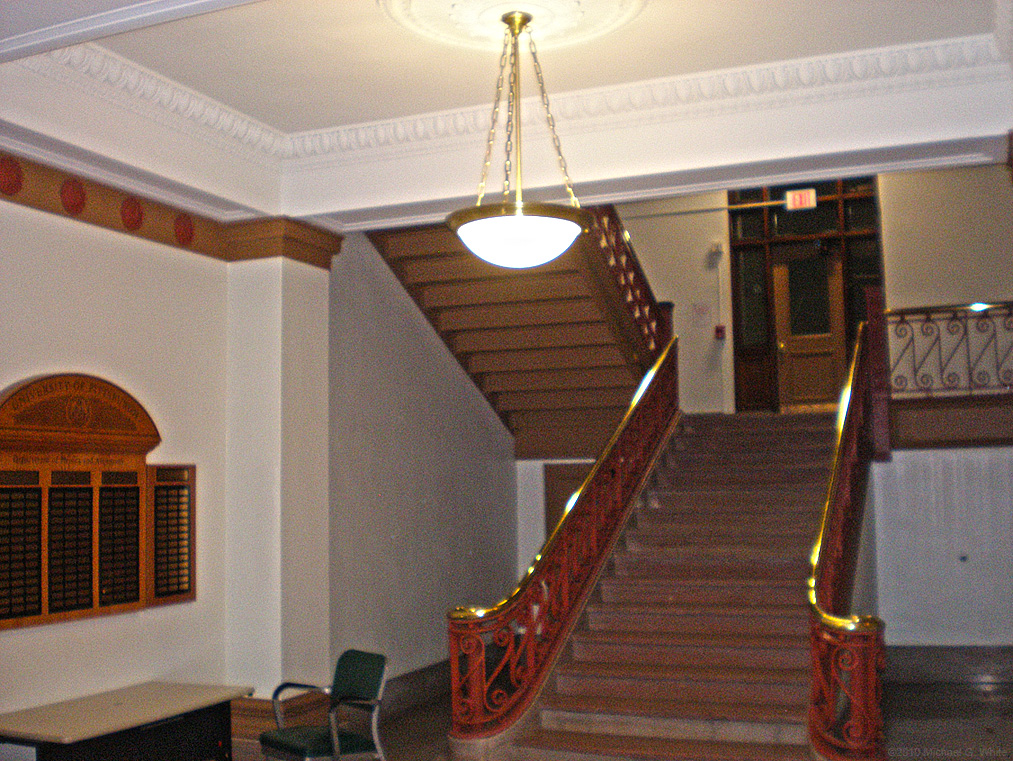
Interior of Allen Hall

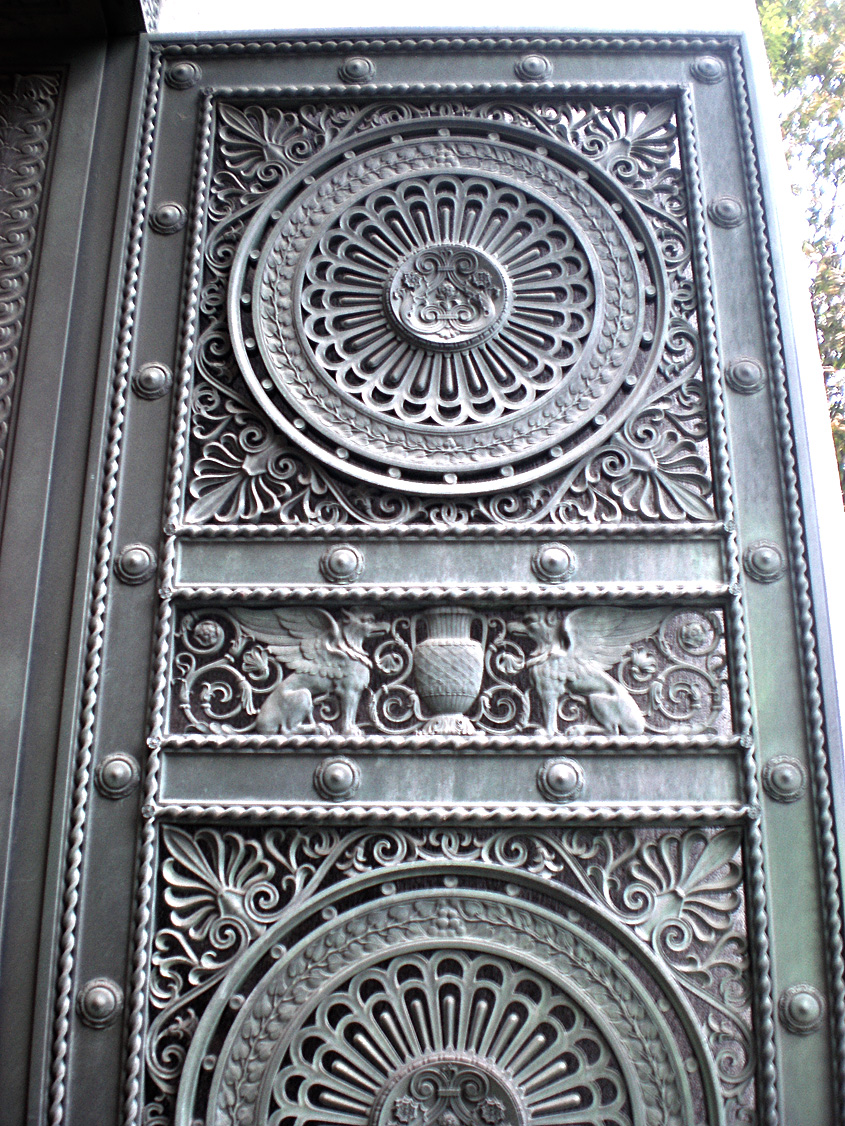
Detail of main entrance door

The building that would become known as Allen Hall was erected as the original home for the Mellon Institute of Industrial Research. The institute was founded for industrial and chemical research by brothers, and University of Pittsburgh alumni, Richard B. Mellon and Andrew W. Mellon. The institute originally grew out of university's Department of Industrial Research and served as a graduate school managed by the University of Pittsburgh until it was incorporated as an independent non-profit research institute in 1927.

The six-story building designed by J. H. Giesey in the Greek Revival style of the university's other buildings that at the time were being constructed in accordance with Henry Hornbostel's acropolis master plan for the university campus. It was erected from 1913 to 1914 at a cost of $230,000 (equivalent to $7.49 million in 2025) to construct and equip, and it was dedicated on February 26, 1915, in a ceremony in which the Mellon brothers turned over the keys of the institute to university Chancellor Samuel McCormick.

The facility originally contained low temperature and heavy equipment rooms in its basement; general offices, a library, assembly room, dark room and a special apparatus room on its first floor; and research laboratories on its upper floors.

The institute soon outgrew this facility and engaged in the construction of a new facility on the corner of Bellefield and Fifth Avenue across from the grounds of the university's Cathedral of Learning. After completion of the new facility in 1937, the old Mellon Institute building was handed over to the university on May 9, 1939. It was remodeled and equipped to provide laboratories and additional classrooms for the School of Medicine, doubling that school's facilities that were then located in Pennsylvania Hall. The School of Medicine's library, administrative offices, several faculty offices, histology and embryology labs, as well as its departments of physiologic chemistry, physiology and pharmacy all moved into the building, freeing Pennsylvania Hall of all but the medical school's first year courses in anatomy and pathology. The School of Medicine began moving into its present facility, Scaife Hall, in the fall of 1955. Today Allen Hall is home to offices, classrooms, and labs of the Department of Physics and Astronomy.

The building was renamed Allen Hall in honor of a former University of Pittsburgh Physics professor, Alexander J. Allen, who arrived at Pitt in the 1930s and led a project for the construction of a cyclotron for producing radioactive isotopes for medical applications and atomic research. This facility, called the Sarah Mellon Scaife Radiation Laboratory, was completed in 1946. During World War II, Allen also participated in the development of radar systems.

== Structure ==
Allen Hall comprises six stories (a ground floor and 1st–5th floors) using granite for the lower two stories and buff brick for the next three stories; the 5th floor is windowless and concealed by the roof. Due to the building's age and landmark status, and despite internal renovations, all floors, with the exception of the 1st (following the most recent renovation) and 3rd (due to the flying tunnel connection to NPL), have only one bathroom; the bathrooms alternate male-female, with the fifth floor's being coed. This is due to a space-saving decision by the original designers that women's bathrooms were unnecessary in a science building. The building is linked on the first three floors to neighboring Old Engineering Hall, and on the 1st and 3rd to the Van de Graaff Building housing the Nuclear Physics Laboratory located at the rear.

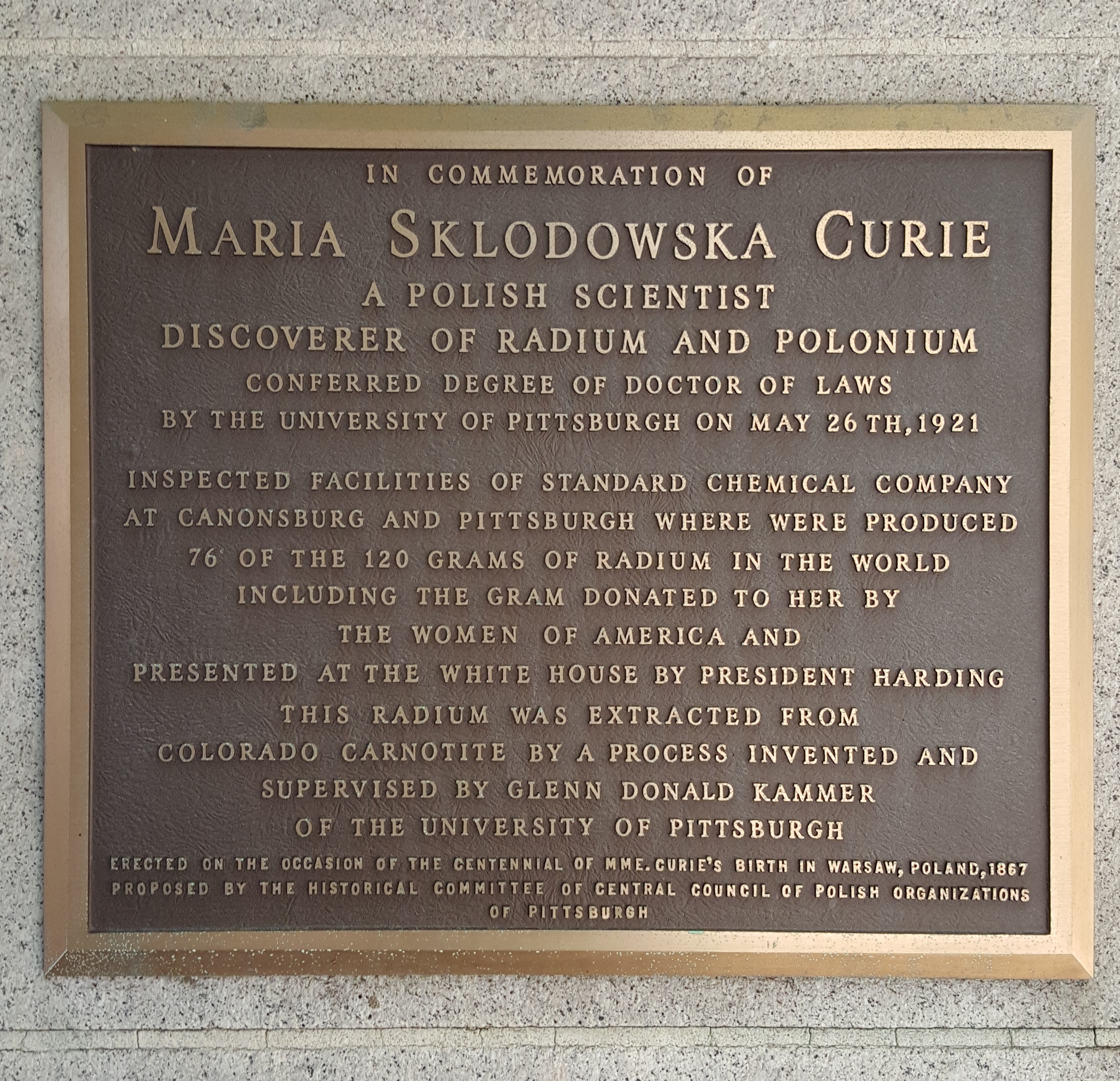
Close-up of the plaque as of November 2015.

The facade at the entrance of this building has a plaque to honor Madame Curie, commemorating the 100th anniversary in 1967 of her birth, the conferring of an honorary degree in 1921, her visit to the plants of the Standard Chemical Company, its role as a major radium producer and in the making of the gram of radium presented to Marie Curie by President Warren G. Harding, and the role of Glenn Donald Kammer, a University of Pittsburgh graduate who supervised its production. The plaque was unveiled on September 20, 1969, by the Archbishop of Kraków, Poland, Cardinal Wojtyła, who in 1978 became Pope John Paul II.

Renovations, upgrades, and improvements for Allen Hall, Old Engineering Hall, Van de Graaff Building and Thaw Hall, were carried out from 2011 to 2013, with the creation and renovation of 13 Department of Astronomy and Physics laboratories located in Allen Hall, Old Engineering Hall, and the Van de Graaff Building. To allow for major internal reconstruction, Allen hall was temporarily vacated for the 2012–2013 academic year, with residents relocated to Thaw, Old Engineering, and Thackeray Halls. The renovations were completed on schedule and Allen was reoccupied at the beginning of the 2013–2014 academic year. The most unusual result of the renovations was the installation of a double rail over the original railing in the main staircase, due to it being below regulation height.

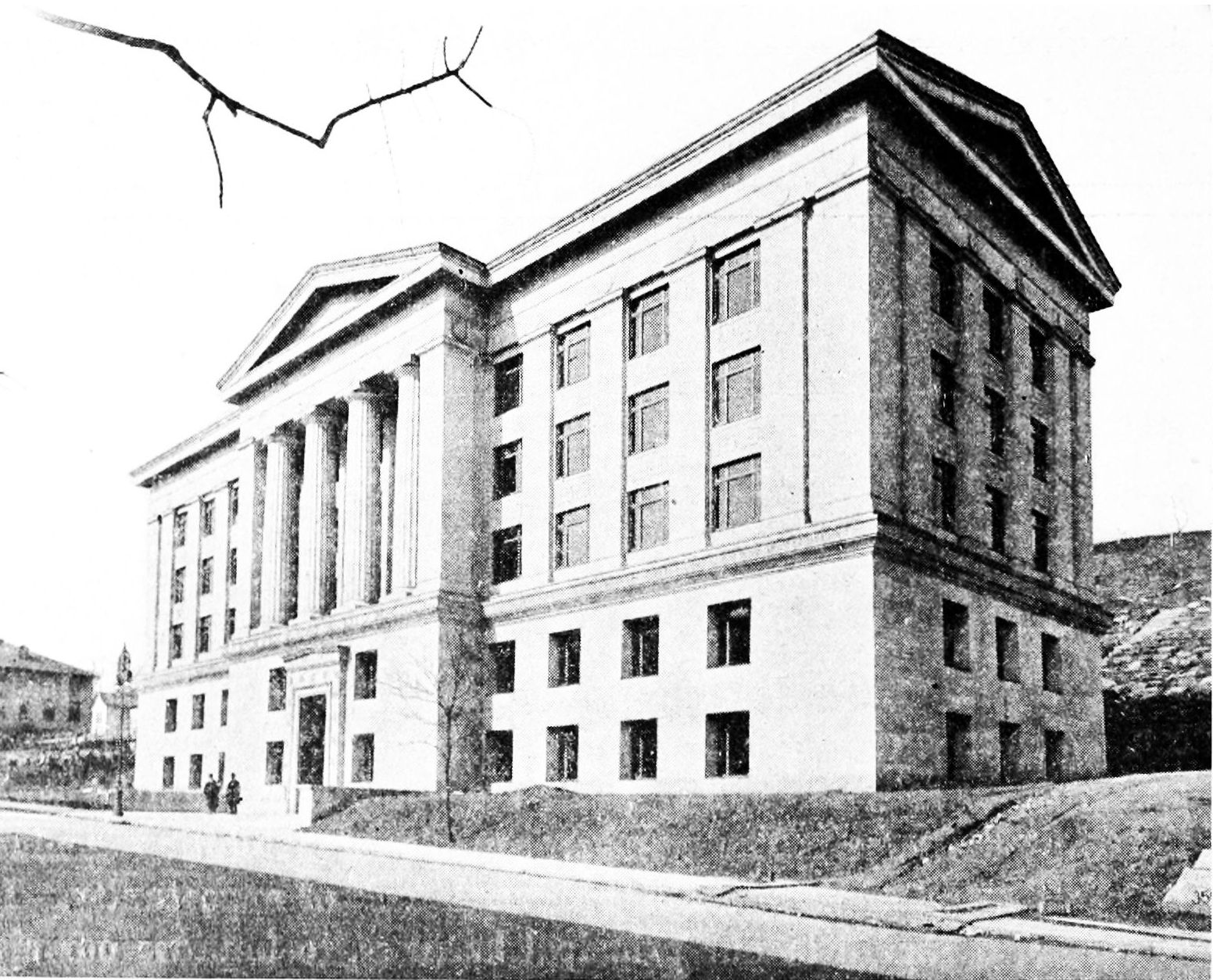
Allen Hall circa 1915 when it served as the Mellon Institute of Industrial Research

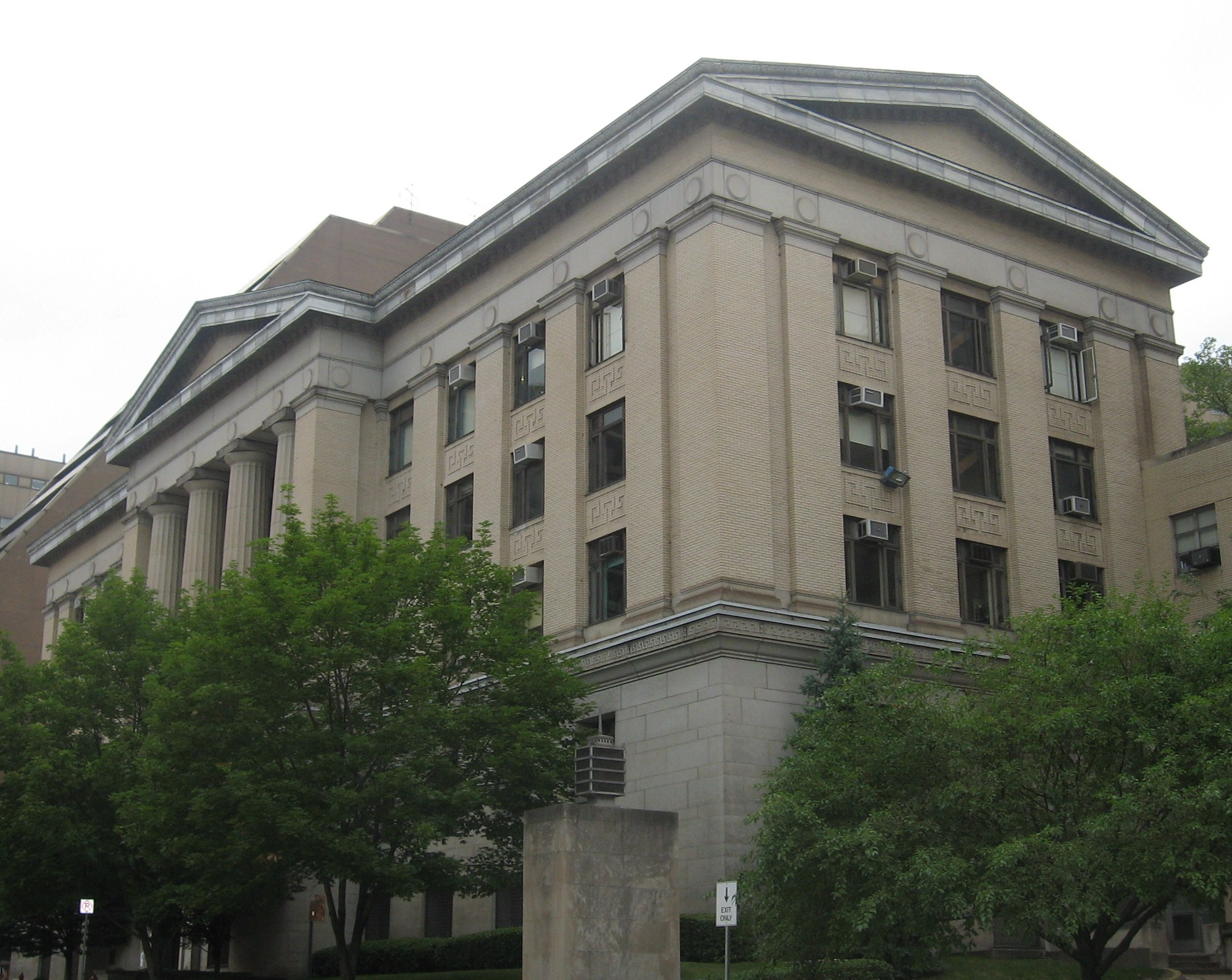
Allen Hall in 2008

Preceded by O'Hara Student Center	University of Pittsburgh buildings Allen Hall; Constructed: 1913–1914	Succeeded by Alumni Hall
