= University of Pittsburgh School of Pharmacy =

Hospital and Pharmacy school

Coordinates: 40.44261°N 79.96324°W

- Type: Public
- Established: September 23, 1878
- Dean: Amy Lynn Seybert
- Faculty: 216
- Undergraduates: 421
- Postgraduates: 28
- Location: Pittsburgh, Pennsylvania, United States
- Campus: Oakland (Main)
- Website: http://www.pharmacy.pitt.edu

The University of Pittsburgh School of Pharmacy is the graduate pharmacy school of the University of Pittsburgh in Pittsburgh, Pennsylvania, United States. Founded in 1878, it offers Doctor of Pharmacy (PharmD) and Doctor of Philosophy (PhD) degrees, as well as a residency training program. The school is one of the university's six schools of the health sciences and is ranked in the top 10 of pharmacy schools according to U.S. News & World Report.

== History ==
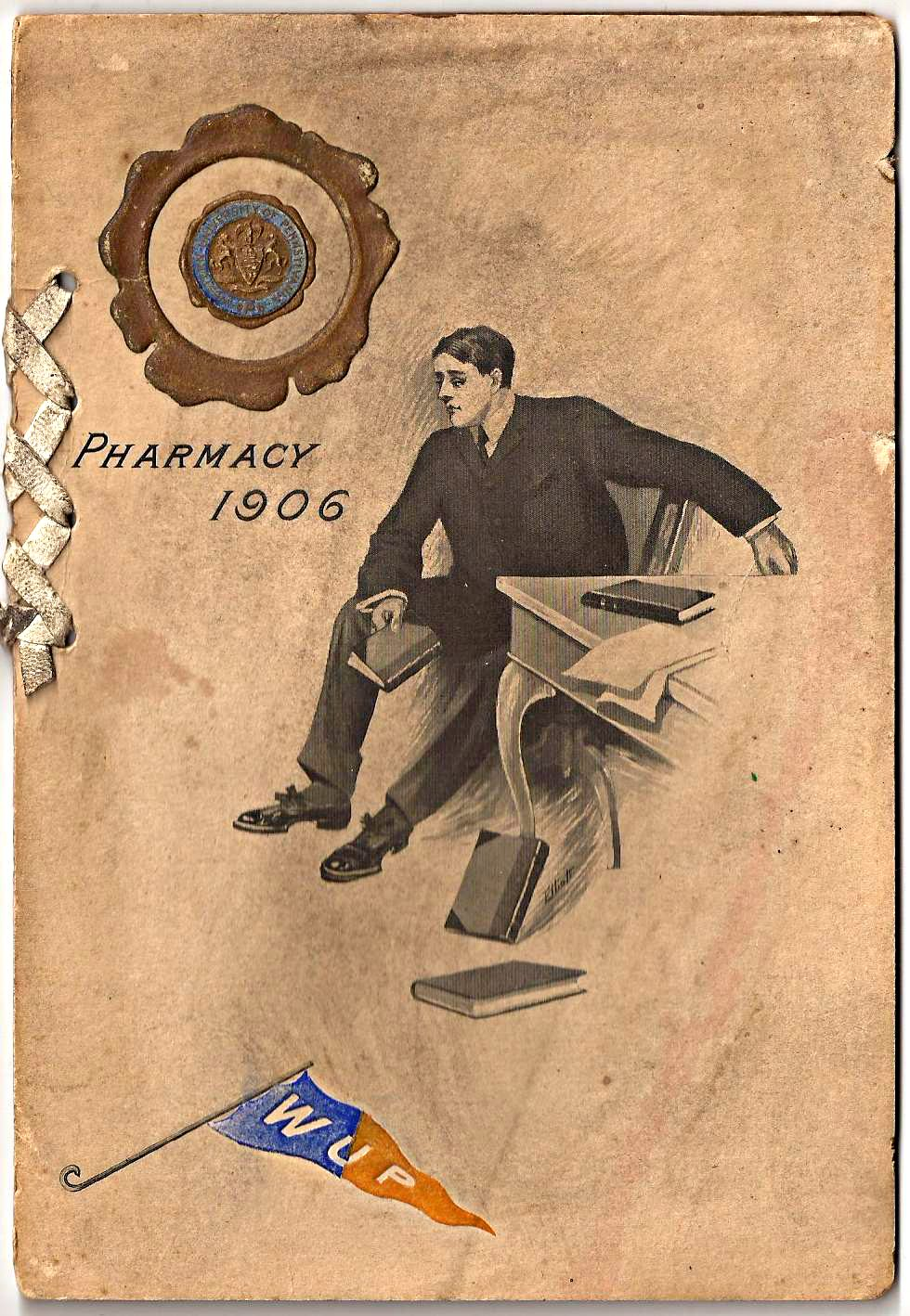
1906 School of Pharmacy directory cover for the Western University of Pennsylvania, which was renamed the University of Pittsburgh in 1908

The University of Pittsburgh's School of Pharmacy was chartered on September 23, 1878, and is the oldest of the University of Pittsburgh's schools of the health sciences. Originally an independent college named the Pittsburgh College of Pharmacy, on April 16, 1896, the college became affiliated with, and a department of, the Western University of Pennsylvania, the name of the University of Pittsburgh until 1908. In 1908, The Pittsburgh College of Pharmacy purchased and merged the Scio College of Pharmacy, formerly located in Scio, Ohio, and adopted its alumni. Over the years The Pittsburgh College of Pharmacy grew increasingly closer to the university, and on January 26, 1948, the two formally merged, transforming the pharmacy college into the University of Pittsburgh School of Pharmacy.

Today the School of Pharmacy is located on the Oakland campus of the University of Pittsburgh and is primarily situated in Salk Hall, which is same building where Jonas Salk developed the first vaccine against polio.

== Academics and research ==
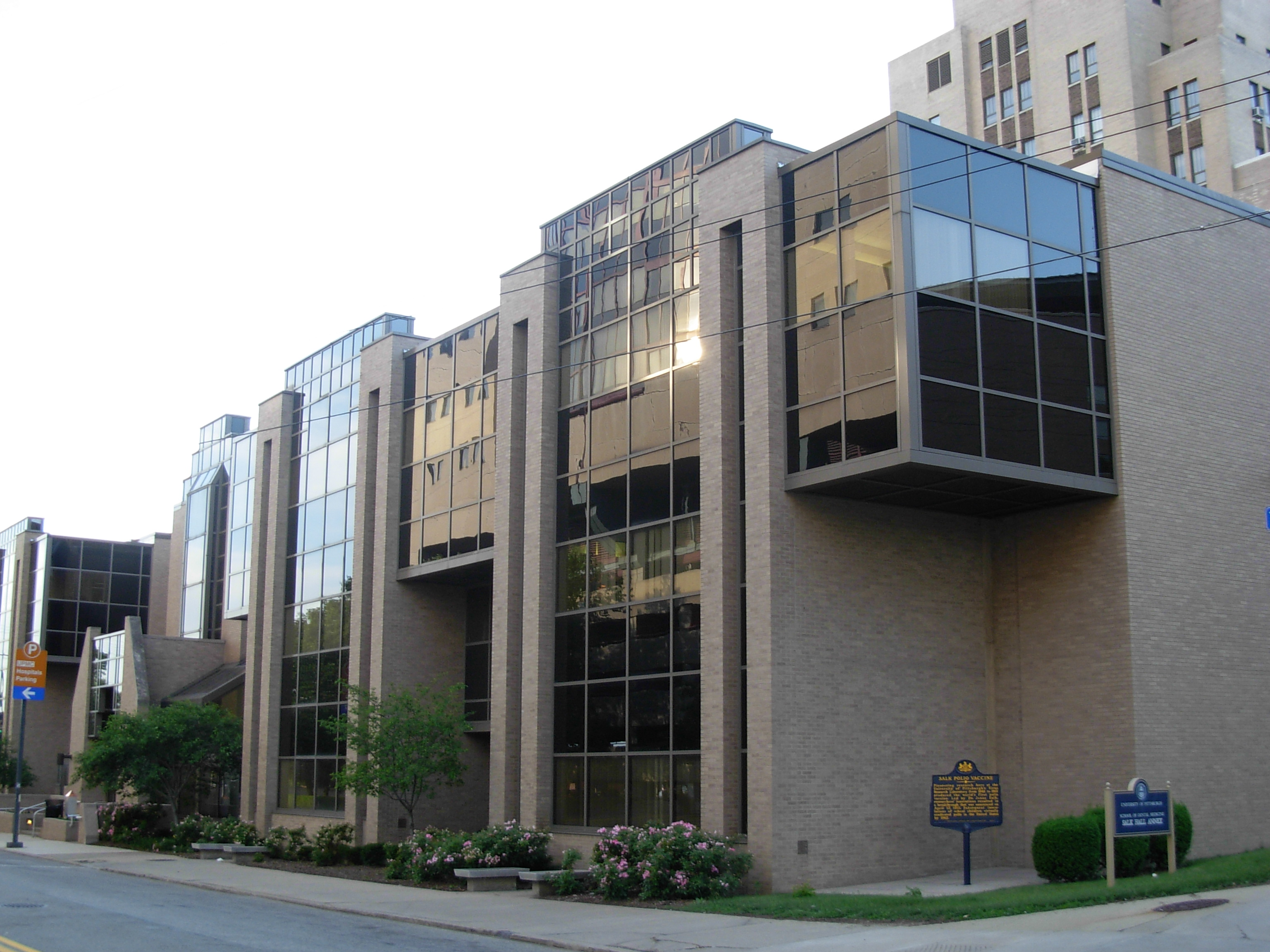
A street level view of Salk Hall, the primary location of the School of Pharmacy. The Commonwealth of Pennsylvania historical plaque honoring Jonas Salk's research conducted in the building that resulted in the first polio vaccine can be seen at the bottom right

The primary educational tracks at the School of Pharmacy are its four-year PharmD program and its graduate programs. Central aspects of Pitt's School of Pharmacy include its emphasis on the integration of science and practice throughout the course of study, emphasis on team building through collaborative learning, a service learning program, and its innovative methods of instruction delivery. The School of Pharmacy also provides a relatively unique Clinical Pharmaceutical Scientist Program that educates scientists to conduct translational and patient-oriented research and the GEAR-UP program to educate students about pharmaceutical research.

The School of Pharmacy also offers a residency program for pharmacy and specialized in conjunction with the University of Pittsburgh Medical Center (UPMC), the UPMC Health Plan, CVS Caremark, and Rite Aid.

The School of Pharmacy research endeavors range from molecular genetics to human clinical research and patient-care outcomes. The school is a major center for pharmaceutical research as evidenced by its consist ranking among the top schools of pharmacy in research funding received from the National Institutes of Health (NIH).

Research centers within the School of Pharmacy include the Center for Pharmacogenetics, the Center for Education and Drug Abuse Research (CEDAR), and the Center for Pharmacoinformatics and Outcomes Research. The School also houses the Cell Imaging Core of the Center for Reproductive Science, a Neuroendocrinology Research Consortium, as well as considerable chemistry expertise in the Drug Discovery Institute of the University. Through its collaboration with UPMC, School of Pharmacy faculty members also lead the combined Pittsburgh Poison and Drug Information Center.

== Organization and facilities ==
The School of Pharmacy is composed of three units: the Office of the Dean, the Department of Pharmaceutical Sciences, and the Department of Pharmacy and Therapeutics. Instruction for the professional and graduate courses in the School of Pharmacy occurs mainly in Salk Hall, in shared classrooms and in a dedicated teaching laboratory. Research laboratories are located on the fifth through eighth floors and the tenth floor of Salk Hall. The ninth and eleventh floors house faculty and administrative offices exclusively. Faculty members also have laboratory facilities in the Biomedical Science Tower 3 as part of the Drug Discovery Institute. Some faculty members have offices in Scaife Hall, Lothrop Hall, and Falk Clinic as well as in UPMC hospitals, the UPMC Children's Hospital of Pittsburgh, and VA Pittsburgh Healthcare System hospitals, in proximity to their patient care practices. Off-site faculty and staff offices are also located in the Birmingham Towers on the South Side.

Along with the five other schools of the health sciences, the School of Pharmacy is adjacent to and affiliated with the University of Pittsburgh Medical Center, which provides care through the Pennsylvania's largest network of tertiary, specialty, and community hospitals. Collectively, these facilities provide a comprehensive center for teaching, patient care, and research in the health sciences.

== Museum ==
The School of Pharmacy also operates the Elmer H. Grimm Sr. Pharmacy Museum, which opened in the fall of 1996. Located on the fourth floor of Salk Hall, the museum holds pharmacy memorabilia dating back to the early 20th century such as drug products, equipment, and sundries. Among the museum's possessions are two hand-carved finials, which were often found over the door or partitions that separated the main part of a pharmacy from the back room where pharmacists did most of their work, an old-fashioned powder mill, and a konseal machine.

== See also ==
- Julius Arnold Koch
