= Anantha Shekhar =

Indian-American neuroscientist

- Born: August 31, 1957 (age 69); India

Academic background
- Education: BS, 1975, St. Joseph's College, Bangalore; MD, 1981, St. John's Medical College; PhD, neuroscience, Indiana University School of Medicine
- Thesis: Behavioral effects of modifying the function of GABA[subscript A] receptors in the dorsomedial hypothalamus of rats (1993)

Anantha Shekhar (born August 31, 1957) is an Indian–American neuroscientist. He is the Senior Vice Chancellor for the Health Sciences and John and Gertrude Petersen Dean at the University of Pittsburgh School of Medicine.

== Early life and education ==
Shekhar was born on August 31, 1957. He was born and raised in a small village in India that had no electricity or running water. Shekhar completed his Bachelor of Science degree at St. Joseph's College, Bangalore and his medical degree at St. John's Medical College before immigrating to the United States in 1981. Upon entering the United States, Shekhar completed his PhD in neuroscience at Indiana University School of Medicine.

== Career ==
Following his PhD, Shekhar remained at Indiana and joined the faculty at their School of Medicine in 1989. As a professor, Shekhar was named the director of a five-year Clinical and Translational Science (CTSI) Award to support CTSI activities at Indiana. As the director of the Indiana Clinical and Translational Sciences Institute, he was elected president of the Association for Clinical and Translational Science in 2012. Following this, Shekhar was named an executive associate dean for research affairs at the IU School of Medicine. In 2018, he was honored with the Watanabe Life Sciences Champion of the Year.

In 2020, Shekhar was named Senior Vice Chancellor for the Health Sciences and John and Gertrude Petersen Dean at the University of Pittsburgh School of Medicine.
