= Salk Hall =

Building in Pittsburgh, Pennsylvania, US

- Salk Hall is named after Jonas Salk who conducted history-making research there. Pitt Stadium, seen in the background to the right, was torn down in 1999 and is now the site of the Petersen Events Center.

- Location within Pittsburgh
- 40.442710°N 79.962914°W
- Location: Oakland neighborhood, Pittsburgh, Pennsylvania

History
- Built: 1940-1941

Site notes
- Architect(s): Richard Irving and Theodore Eicholz
- Architectural style: Art Deco
- Governing body: University of Pittsburgh

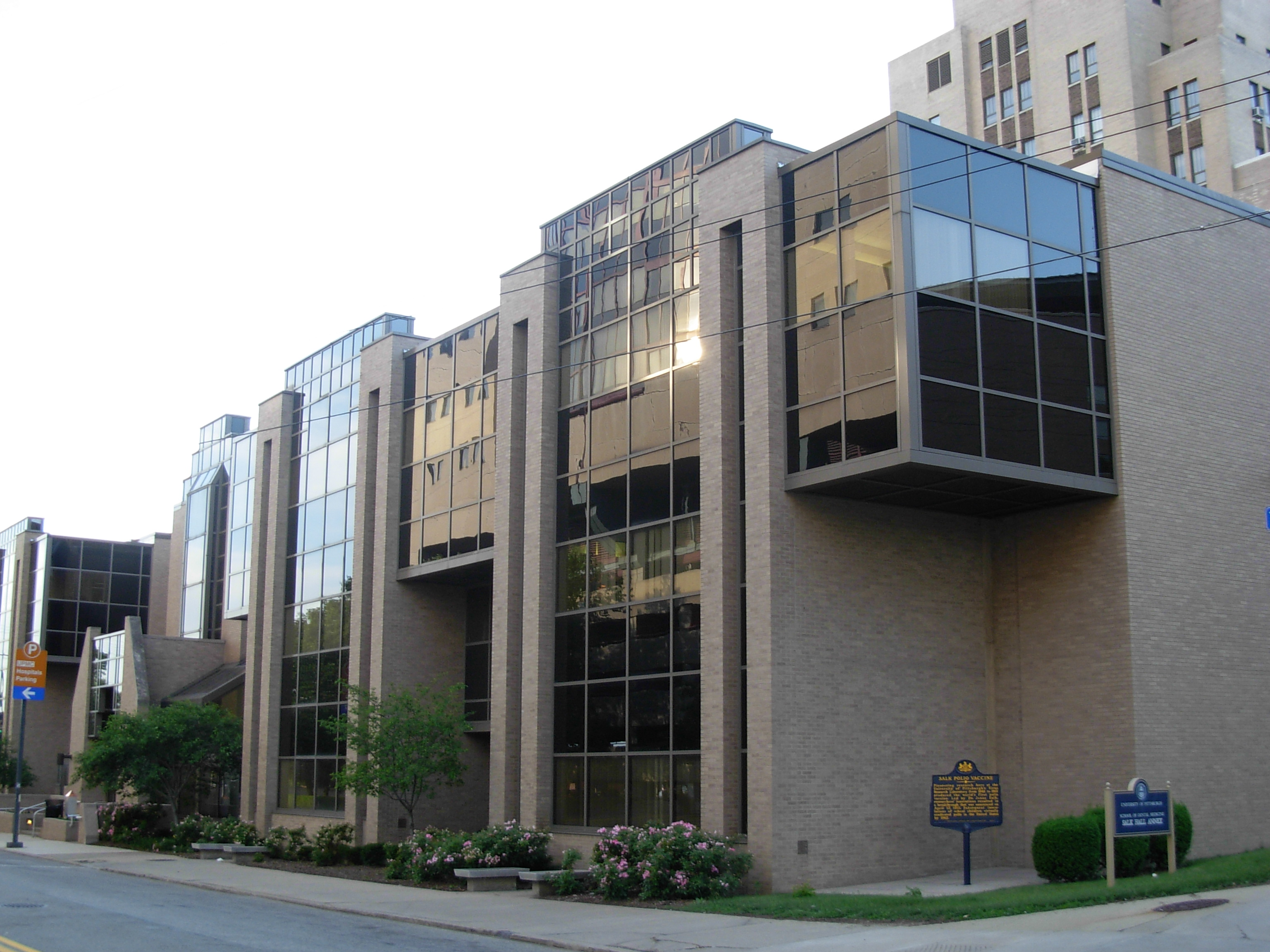
A street level view of the School of Dental Medicine's Salk Hall Annex. The Pennsylvania historical plaque honoring Jonas Salk's research conducted in Salk Hall that resulted in the first polio vaccine can be seen at the bottom right.

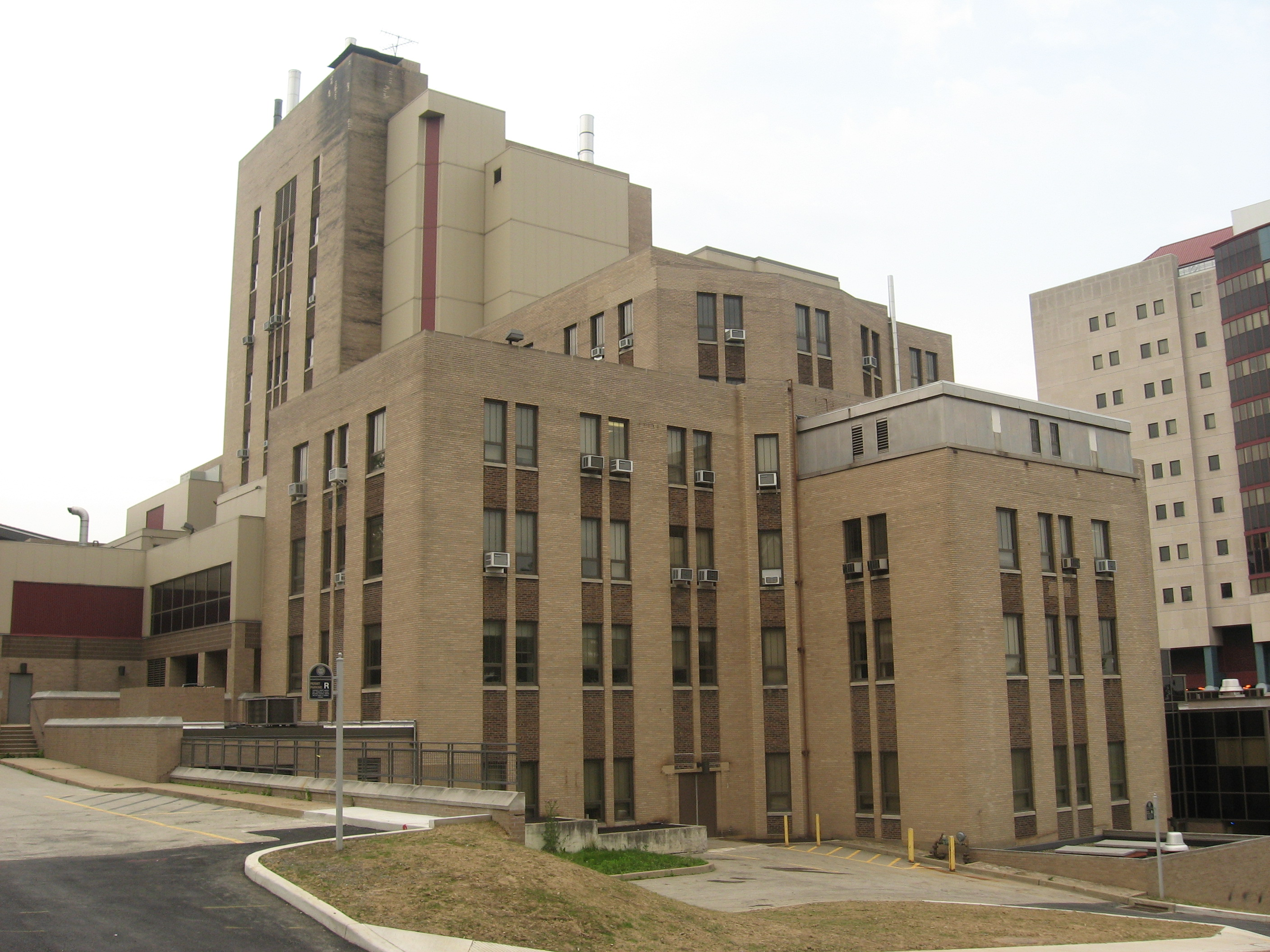
Salk Hall from the rear

Jonas Salk Hall at the University of Pittsburgh is a Pennsylvania state and Pittsburgh History and Landmarks Foundation Historic Landmark. The Art Deco building is named after Jonas Salk, who conducted his research on the first polio vaccine in a basement laboratory while on the faculty at the University of Pittsburgh.

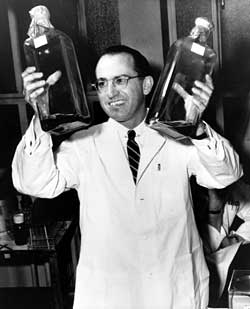
Jonas Salk in 1955 holds bottles of a culture used to grow polio vaccines

== History ==
The main structure of Salk Hall is the former city owned Pittsburgh Municipal Hospital for Contagious Diseases constructed in 1941 on land the university had given to the city. It was designed by Richard Irving and Theodore Eicholz. The hospital was built as a project by President Roosevelt's Public Works Administration. The 225-bed hospital was originally part of the Medical Center associated with the University and was intended to be used primarily to treat communicable diseases. However, when antibiotics virtually eliminated the need to quarantine patients, the building had become a financial burden on the city. Therefore, in September 1949, work began on remodeling the building, and it temporarily housed Pitt's School of Public Health. In October 1957, the Municipal Hospital was formally acquired from the city for $1.3 million ($14.9 million today) and renamed Jonas Salk Hall. For a time, the upper floors of the building served as a residence for students. Pitt remodeled it to house the School of Dental Medicine and School of Pharmacy in 1961-1962.

== Annex ==
The Salk Hall Annex, a major renovation and three-story addition designed by the architectural firm Deeter, Ritchey, and Sippel for the Dental School, was completed the Terrace Street side of the building in 1967 for a cost of over $5 million ($51.1 million today). Today, it serves as a main entrance for Salk Hall and the dental clinics.

A new $50.6 million ($75 million today) addition and renovation to Salk Hall was announced in January 2010. It will include the construction of an 80,000-square-foot (7,400 m^{2}) research tower in the parking area behind the existing building by Ballinger Architects with associates DRS Architects. The new tower is planned to house laboratories and support spaces relocated from their current home in Salk Hall in order to free up space for additional classrooms and offices in the original structure. The target completion date is July, 2014.

== Dental Museum ==
A dental museum is housed in the first floor reception area of Salk Hall. The museum contains a variety of original dental artifacts, including a c. 1910 dental chair, and x-ray machine and instrument cabinet from the 1920s.

== Pharmacy Museum ==
Also contained in Salk Hall is the Elmer H. Grimm Sr. Pharmacy Museum, which opened in the fall of 1996. Located on the fourth floor, the museum holds pharmacy memorabilia such as drug products, equipment, and sundry products dating back to the early 20th century. Among the museum's possessions are two hand-carved finials, which were often found over the door or partitions that separated the main part of the pharmacy from the back room where pharmacists did most of their work, an old-fashioned powder mill, and a konseal machine.

Preceded by Stephen Foster Memorial	University of Pittsburgh buildings Salk Hall; Constructed: 1941	Succeeded by Fitzgerald Field House
