= Thaw Hall =

- U.S. Historic district – Contributing property
- Pittsburgh Landmark – PHLF
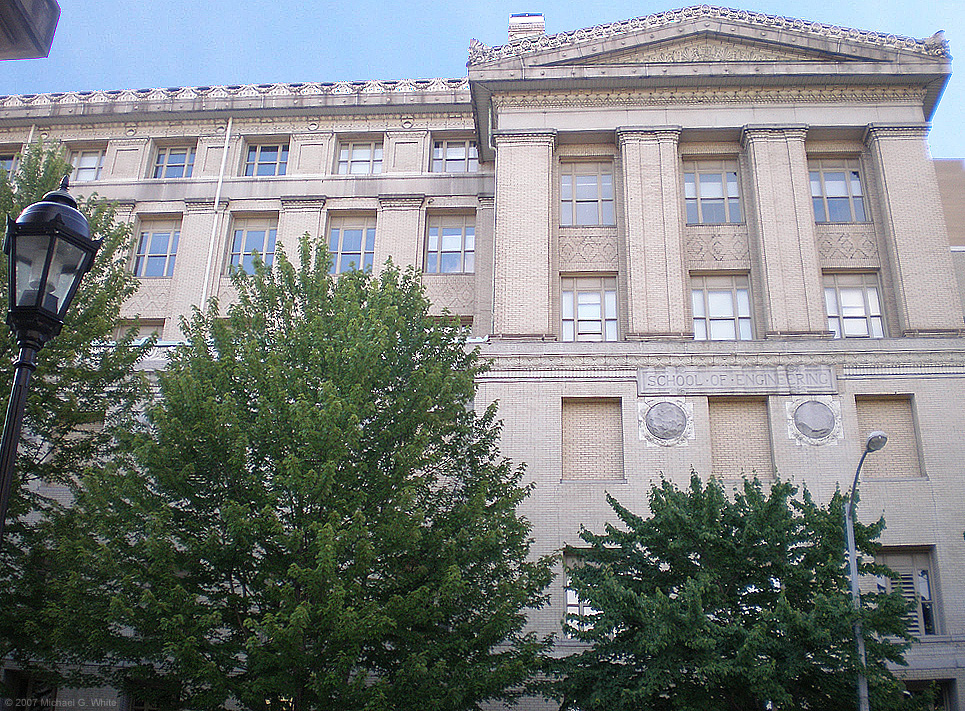
- Thaw Hall at the University of Pittsburgh
- Coordinates: 40°26′42.59″N 79°57′27.24″W
- Area: Schenley Farms Historic District
- Built: 1909-1910
- Architect: Henry Hornbostel
- Architectural style: Beaux-Arts
- Part of: Schenley Farms Historic District (ID83002213)

Significant dates
- Added to NRHP: July 22, 1983
- Designated PHLF: 2003

Thaw Hall is a historic academic building on the campus of the University of Pittsburgh that is a contributing property to the Schenley Farms National Historic District and has been named a Pittsburgh History and Landmarks Foundation Historic Landmark. The five-story building of stone, brick, and terra cotta was completed in 1910 in the Neoclassical Beaux-Arts style by architect Henry Hornbostel and today serves as space for a variety of academic classrooms, labs, offices, and centers. It is located between, and connected to, the university's Old Engineering Hall and Space Research Coordination Center (SRCC) along O'Hara Street in the Oakland neighborhood of Pittsburgh.

== History and use ==
The design for Thaw Hall came from Henry Hornbostel's winning submission, termed the "Acropolis Plan", for a 1907 national competition to design a new campus for the University of Pittsburgh which was moving from its Observatory Hill campus to its current location in the Oakland section of Pittsburgh. Hornbostel's plan was begun in 1908 with the construction of the now demolished School of Mines, later renamed State Hall. State Hall's construction was closely followed by the laying of the cornerstone for what was originally termed the Engineering Building in 1909. Construction on the Engineering Building was completed in 1910, and its dedication took place on June 15 of that year, at which time it was renamed in honor of Pitt trustee and benefactor Benjamin Thaw Sr., who donated a substantial amount toward the building's construction. Only a few other buildings in the Acropolis Plan design were constructed, including the original Pennsylvania Hall in 1911 as well as the Mineral Industries Building in 1912. However, Thaw Hall is the only surviving building of Hornbostel's original concept, as well as the oldest building on Pitt's Oakland campus that was originally constructed for academic purposes.

Originally home to Pitt's School of Engineering, it is now the secondary home to its Department of Physics and Astronomy, and the location of the Physics department's Resource Room, a student help center. Several other departments, including Asian Languages, Chemistry, and Archaeology, have offices, classrooms, and labs in various locations throughout the building. It additionally is the home of the Architectural Studies Program's "architecture lab" which, following its dedication in the spring of 2007, serves as a dedicated design studio space that accommodates a two-semester architectural studio sequence that facilitates intensive instruction from practicing architects in the fundamentals of spatial thinking, graphic representation techniques, and model building. The Office of Experiential Learning, Freshman Programs, and the Writing Center were all previously located in this building.

Renovations, upgrades, and improvements for Thaw Hall, Old Engineering Hall, and Allen Hall have been announced and are preliminarily targeted in to be in excess of $58.6 million according to the university's 12-year facilities master plan.

== Architectural elements ==
The only surviving building of the "Acropolis Plan" seen here relatively new about 1910

According to architectural historian Christopher Drew Armstrong, the five-story stone, brick, and terra cotta building contains motifs from classical elements that are "specifically derived from Greek models...but not constrained by them" and that are "derived from the École des Beaux-Arts in Paris, where Hornbostel trained." Thaw Hall was intended as a gatepost or supporting building in the never realized "Acropolis Plan" for Pitt's campus, and was designed to work with additional proposed, but never realized, buildings. This is evidenced by the west end of the building that went unfinished with the expectation that construction would continue along in that direction, but was only subsequently connected to the university's newer engineering facility (now termed "Old Engineering Hall") in 1955. According to Armstrong, Hornbostel used a balcony-like element to set back the upper part of the building so the lower levels could act as a podium in order to "give a horizontal continuity to a chain of buildings that were planned". General motifs repeated in Thaw Hall's facade include recessed bricks within larger brick columns, as well as deeply recessed windows that are trimmed by decorative brick patterns that vary by floor. The details of the building include ornamental elements reflective of classical design including Doric columns as well as cornice and pediment containing repeating classical terra cotta decorative patterns incorporating waves, palmettes, or leaves, as well as granite rosettes and Greek Key motifs. The words "School of Engineering” is sculpted into the O’Hara Street side of the building above two unfinished stone elements that may have been intended to be sculpted into portraits had the Hornbostel campus plan been fully executed. Armstrong contends that Thaw Hall's worth as a historic building is demonstrated in Hornbostel's intentional manipulation of effects of light and shadow by the application of varying amounts of relief to the ornamentation in order to create alternate dark and light patterns that are still observable from a distance, while abating the effect as the viewer looks at the lower parts of the building.

The building has several odd architectural elements. Due to an odd numbering decision, there is a sub-basement, a basement and a mezzanine, in ascending order, all of which are above ground, the later two having windowed rooms, with the first floor roughly level with Old Engineering Hall's second floor. There is a back corridor on the Mezzanine level (2 stories above ground level), currently housing the architecture lab, which can only be accessed by elevator or by walking through one of the classrooms (Thaw 11), passing directly in front of the blackboard at the lecturer's level. The Basement level has only a single entrance, located in a recessed door on the stairs leading from the Mezzanine level into SRCC; a single exit, a glass vestibule leading into the OEH vehicle turnaround; and an elevator door located inside an office space, which is locked off to external access. The basement level currently houses the Pittsburgh Quantum Institute, a multidisciplinary research institute that focuses on quantum sciences and engineering in the Pittsburgh region.

== Space Research Coordination Center ==
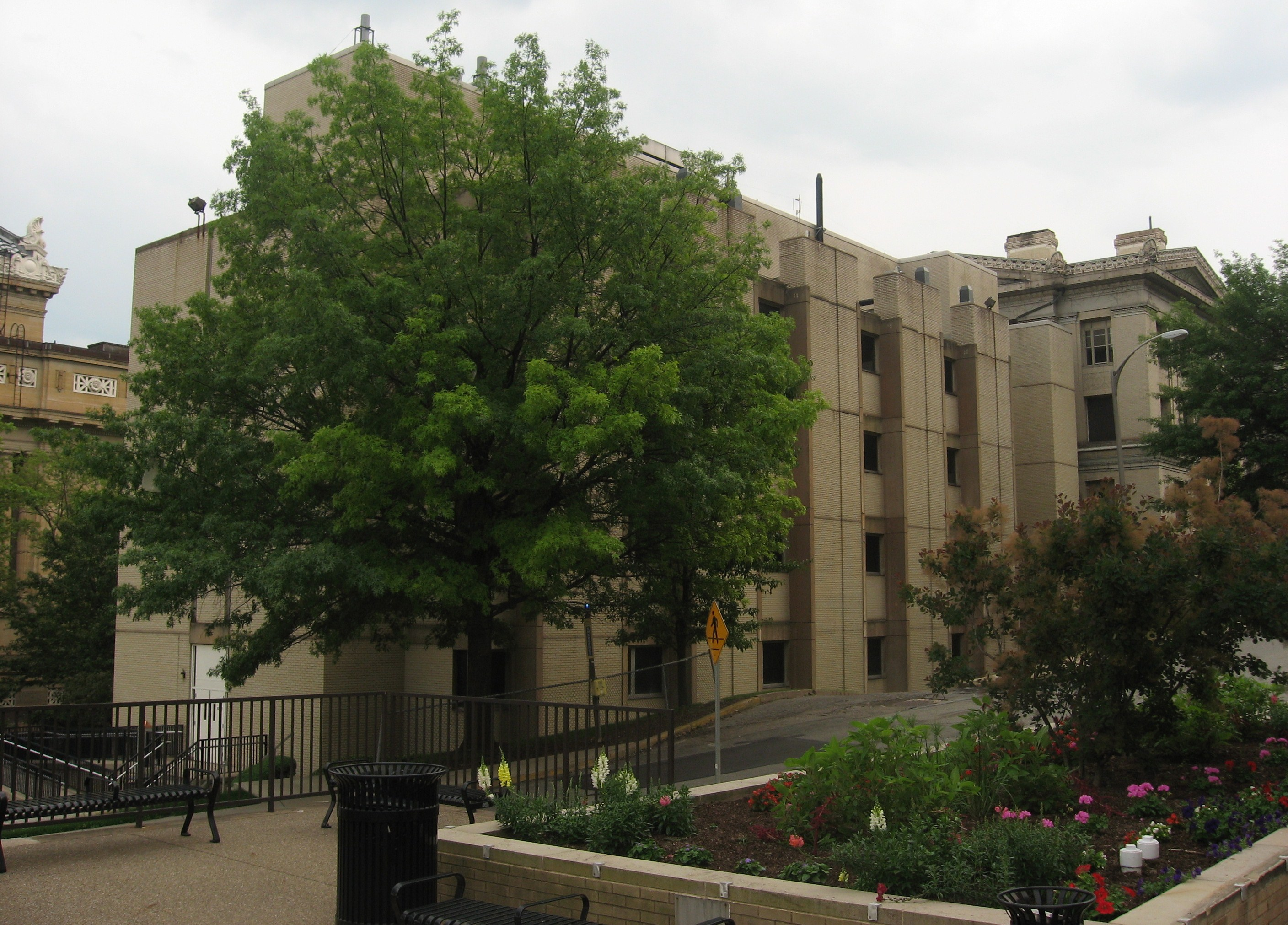
The Space Research Coordination Center is attached to the former main entrance to Thaw Hall

The Space Research Coordination Center (SRCC), sometimes referred to as the Space Research Coordinating Center, was completed in 1965 from funding obtained from a $1.5 million NASA grant for studies in the natural sciences, social sciences, engineering, and health areas concerned with the aerospace field. The SRCC was constructed as an annex connected to the eastern side of Thaw Hall. The addition includes a common entrance on O’Hara Street for both the SRCC and Thaw Hall that obscured the original Thaw Hall entrance which contained two large Doric columns, ornamentation, and wrought-iron gates. Because of this, a ground level side-door accessible via the basement of Old Engineering Hall is the only direct exterior access to Thaw Hall, with all other access via internal connections from Old Engineering Hall or SRCC. The third floor of the SRCC is connected to the Mezzanine floor (of the basement level which is the second floor above ground level) of Thaw Hall at Thaw Hall's original entrance. The design of SRCC in mimics Thaw Hall in the color of the brick and the motif of recessed bricks in the middle of larger brick columns, but contains a flat roof and is absent of ornamentation. Today, the SRCC houses the university's Department of Geology and Environmental Science as well as offices from other departments including the Department of Physics & Astronomy.

Preceded by University Child Development Center	University of Pittsburgh buildings Thaw Hall; Constructed: 1910	Succeeded by Pittsburgh Athletic Association
