= University of Pittsburgh School of Dental Medicine =

College in Pittsburgh, Pennsylvania, US

Coordinates: 40°26′33″N 79°57′46″W

- Type: Public
- Established: 1896
- Dean: Marnie Oakley, DMD
- Faculty: 178
- Students: 439 (77 undergraduate, 322 first professional, and 40 specialty residents)
- Location: Pittsburgh, Pennsylvania, United States
- Campus: Oakland (Main)
- Website: dental.pitt.edu

The University of Pittsburgh School of Dental Medicine is the dental school of the University of Pittsburgh (Pitt). It is located in Pittsburgh, Pennsylvania, United States. It is one of Pitt's six schools of the health sciences and one of several dental schools in Pennsylvania. It is closely affiliated with the University of Pittsburgh Medical Center. The School of Dental Medicine accepted 3.6% of applicants for the class of 2016, a record low for the school's entire history.

It is located in Salk Hall on Pitt's campus. Each year, between 70 and 80 students graduate from Pitt's D.M.D. program.

Admission into the School of Dental Medicine is highly competitive. Eighty incoming students were accepted out of 2,200 applications submitted. Total mean college GPA of incoming students in 2017 was 3.74 (science 3.67); academic average DAT score was 21.6.

Dr. Marnie Oakley is the School of Dental Medicine's current dean.

== History ==
Founded as the Pittsburgh Dental College, the school was organized and chartered simultaneously with its establishment as a department of dentistry at the Western University of Pennsylvania, the former name of the University of Pittsburgh. The School of Dental Medicine welcomed its first class of 119 freshmen that September. The school grew quickly and moved into increasingly larger facilities. Under the leadership of Dean H. Edmund Friesell, the Dental College was renamed the School of Dentistry when it became an integral part of the university when the university assumed charge of the Dental Department and property following the implementation of an agreement on October 5, 1905. By the 1920s, the dental school was reported to be, for at least a time, the largest in the world.

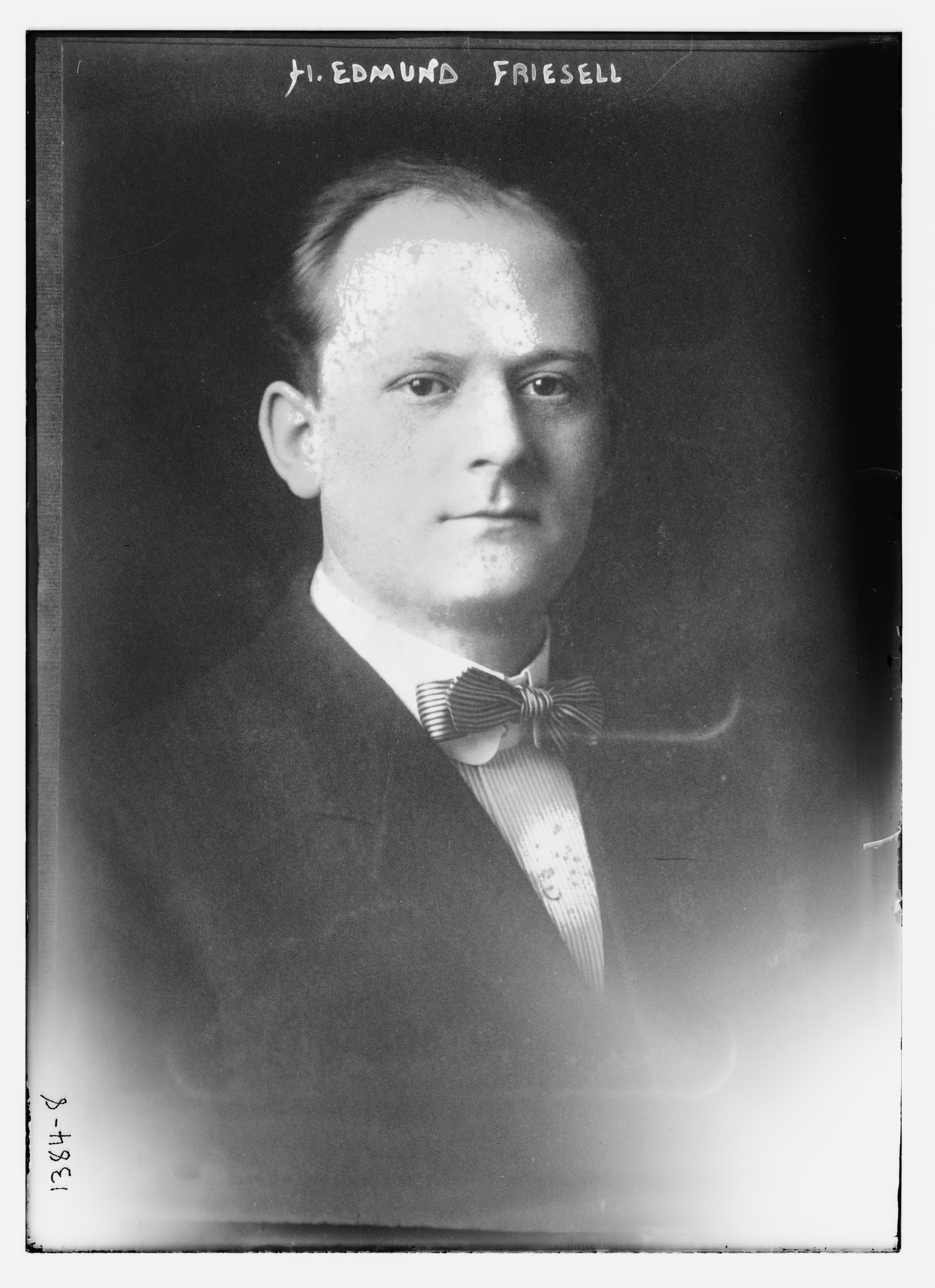
Friesell

The School of Dental Medicine has occupied its current space in Salk Hall, which was converted from a former municipal hospital facility to house Pitt's dental and pharmacy schools, since 1967.

Noteworthy events in School of Dental Medicine history:

- The Pittsburgh Dental College admitted its first female student, Ms. Mary L. Glenn, in 1898. In 2008–09, 34 percent of the students in the School of Dental Medicine's entering freshman class were women.
- The School of Dentistry awarded its first master's degree in dentistry to Nora E. Murry in 1935. The School of Dental Medicine now awards advanced degrees in 10 different disciplines.
- In 1963, the school graduated its first class of dental assistants. Pitt's dental hygiene program is the only such program in the state of Pennsylvania that is part of a major university and accredited dental school and affiliated with a medical center.
- In 1965, five of the dental school's chairs were dedicated to the treatment of children with disabilities. Today, the School of Dental Medicine bears the reputation of leadership and innovation in treatment of patients with special needs.
- The Doctor of Dental Medicine (D.M.D.) degree replaced the Doctor of Dental Surgery degree in 1967 and the school was renamed the School of Dental Medicine to reflect the profession's evolution.

== Education ==
The University of Pittsburgh School of Dental Medicine offers the following educational programs:

First Professional DMD

Residency Training Programs in:

- Dental Anesthesiology
- Endodontics
- General Practice Residency
- Oral and maxillofacial pathology
- Oral and Maxillofacial Surgery
- Orthodontics and Dentofacial Orthopedics
- Pediatric Dentistry
- Periodontics
- Prosthodontics

Dental Hygiene

- Certificate
- Baccalaureate

International/Advanced Standing Program Interschool Collaborative Programs

- Multidisciplinary Master of Public Health
- Master of Education, Higher Education Administration
- Master of Education, Research Methodology
- Graduate Certificate in Geriatric Dentistry

Dental Informatics Postgraduate Program

The School of Dental Medicine also offers a variety of continuing education courses, which are held both on-campus locations and at 13 off-site locations.

== Research ==
School of Dental Medicine faculty members are involved in the following research centers:

- Center for Oral Health Research in Appalachia
- Center for Dental Informatics
- Center for Craniofacial and Dental Genetics
- Center for Craniofacial Regeneration
- Dental Registry and DNA Repository

Additional research is ongoing in the following departments:

- Dental Anesthesiology
- Dental Public Health
- Oral Biology
- Oral and Maxillofacial Surgery
- Oral and Maxillofacial Radiology
- Orthodontics & Dentofacial Orthopedics
- Pediatric Dentistry
- Periodontics
- Prosthodontics

The school offers numerous opportunities for students interested in pursuing scientific research as well. The Dean's Summer Research Scholarship supports a three-month summer research experience to three incoming first professional dental students each year. Also, the school's annual research symposium showcases student work in scientific investigation.

== School Facilities ==
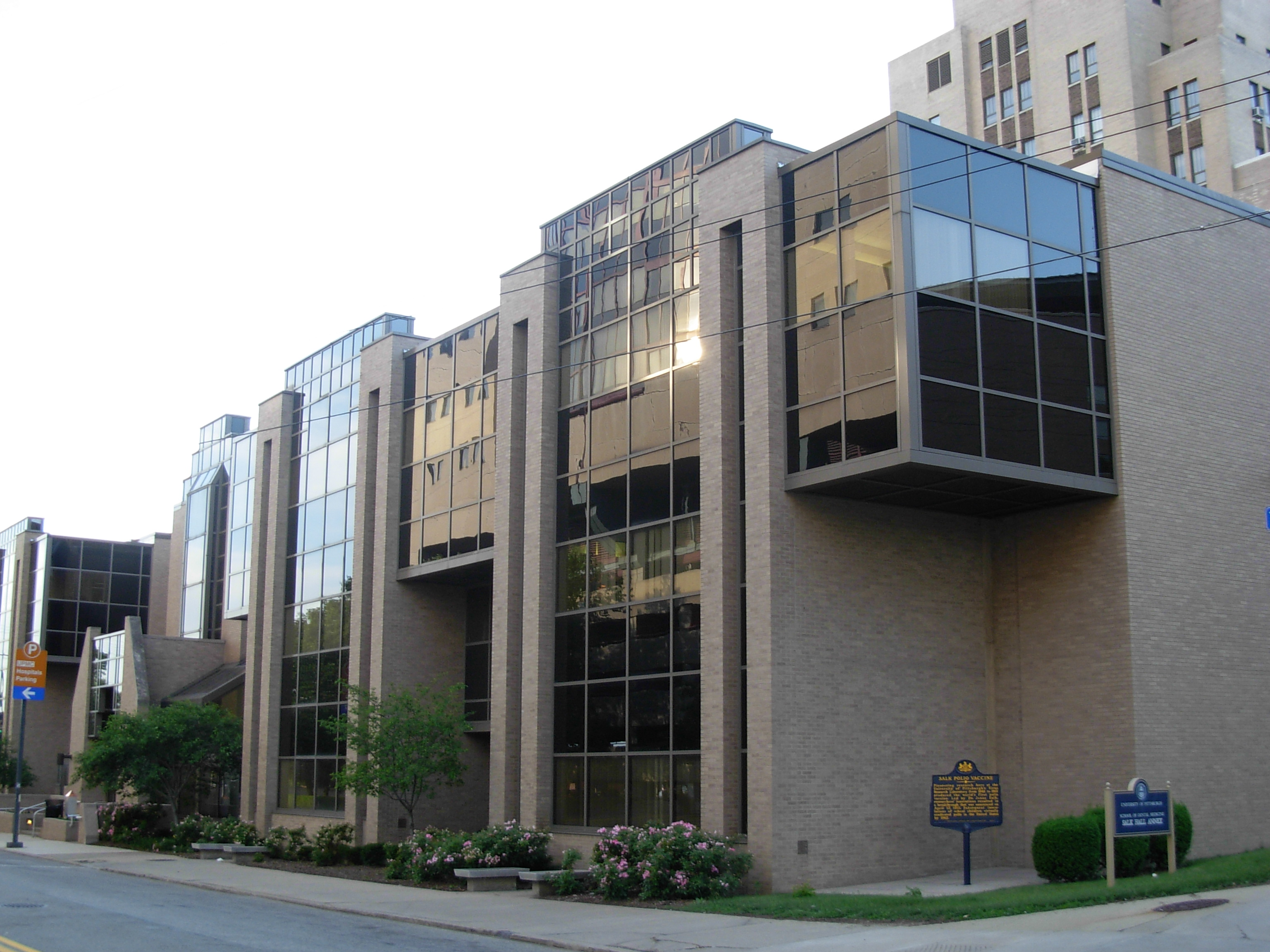
Salk Hall

Educational

The School of Dental Medicine facility occupies Salk Hall and the adjoining Salk Hall Dental Annex and is located on the University's upper campus near UPMC hospitals and the School of Medicine.

Clinical

The School of Dental Medicine treats many patients in its clinical facilities, offering the full range of dental services. Treatment is provided by dental hygiene students, third- and fourth-year dental students or by specialty residents and is supervised by faculty members. Patients who prefer treatment by faculty members rather than students may choose University Dental Health Services, the School of Dental Medicine's faculty practice. UDHS dentists also offer comprehensive services, ranging from routine dental care to various specialty areas.

A number of the School of Dental Medicine's clinical offerings are specialized for certain groups of patients.

- Center for Patients with Special Needs: The Center provides comprehensive dental care to patients with disabilities. It is equipped with six dedicated, multi-specialty treatment rooms including two private treatment areas equipped for general anesthesia, a designated recovery area for sedation and general anesthesia patients, and a dedicated waiting and reception area.
- Multidisciplinary Implant Center: Housed in 2,900 square feet (270 m^{2}) of space, the MIC features nine operatories, including two full surgical suites.
- Emergency Clinic: The School of Dental Medicine is equipped to handle dental emergencies for patients who do not have access to such care elsewhere. Dental emergencies may include acute pain, swelling, or bleeding, for example.
- Oral Pathology Biopsy Service: An Oral Pathology biopsy service exists for community Oral and Maxillofacial Surgeons and other dentists and dental specialists in need of biopsy interpretation
- Cone-beam computed topography unit: The CBCT unit uses a cone-shaped X-ray rather than a linear one to create three-dimensional images that have many applications in dental medicine. CBCT imaging can be helpful in planning implants, orthognathic surgery, and evaluating pathology, among other dental procedures. Dentists practicing in the Pittsburgh region may schedule patients for CBCT scans as an additional resource in their course of treatment.

Other

The School of Dental Medicine's Dental Museum is now closed, at one time it featured a host of dental artifacts used by early 20th century practitioners. It also included works of fine art by alumnus Dr. Frederick Franck (DDS '42) and Mr. Virgil Cantini.

== Publications ==
The School of Dental Medicine publishes Pitt Dental Magazine biannually to inform the school's alumni and friends about its activities and initiatives. It also distributes an electronic alumni newsletter a number of times throughout the year and a monthly e-newsletter to faculty, staff, and students at the school.

The school also publishes a Facts and Figures brochure, which is updated annually.

== Notable Alumni/Faculty ==
- W. Harry Archer (DDS, 1927) – Oral surgeon who contributed to the establishment of the specialty and hospital based dentistry
- Leonard M. Monheim (DDS, 1933) – Established the first dental anesthesiology program in the country, President of Presbyterian-University Hospital medical staff at his death, author of 6 textbooks

== Celebrity alumni ==
- John Bain "Jock" Sutherland (DDS, 1918) – Successful football coach and dental faculty at the University of Pittsburgh and later coach for the Pittsburgh Steelers
- Britt Baker (DMD, 2018) – professional wrestler with All Elite Wrestling, also with a regular dental practice in Florida
