= Lothrop Hall =

Dormitory at the University of Pittsburgh

Coordinates: 40.441732°N 79.960117°W

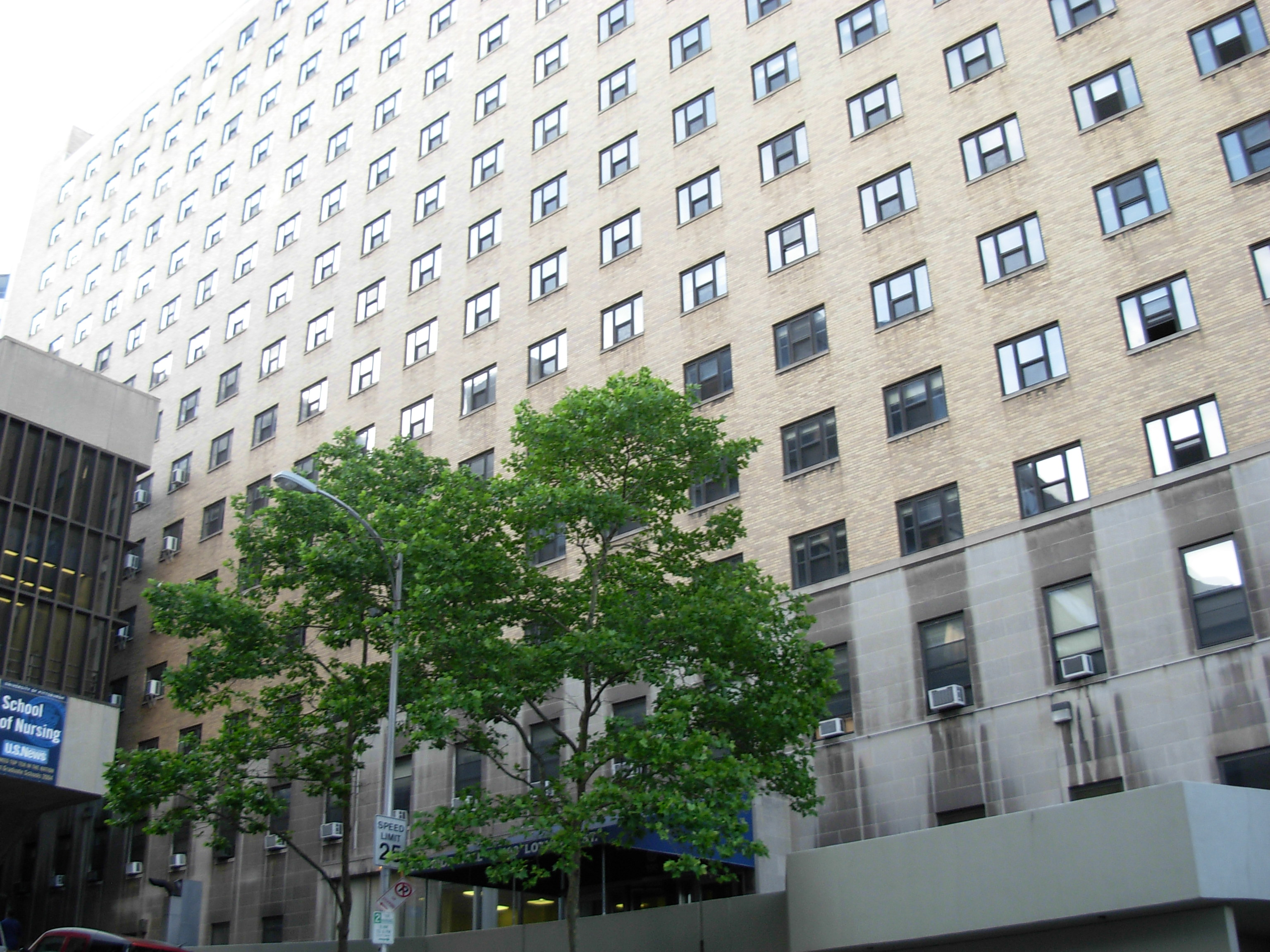
Lothrop Hall at the University of Pittsburgh.

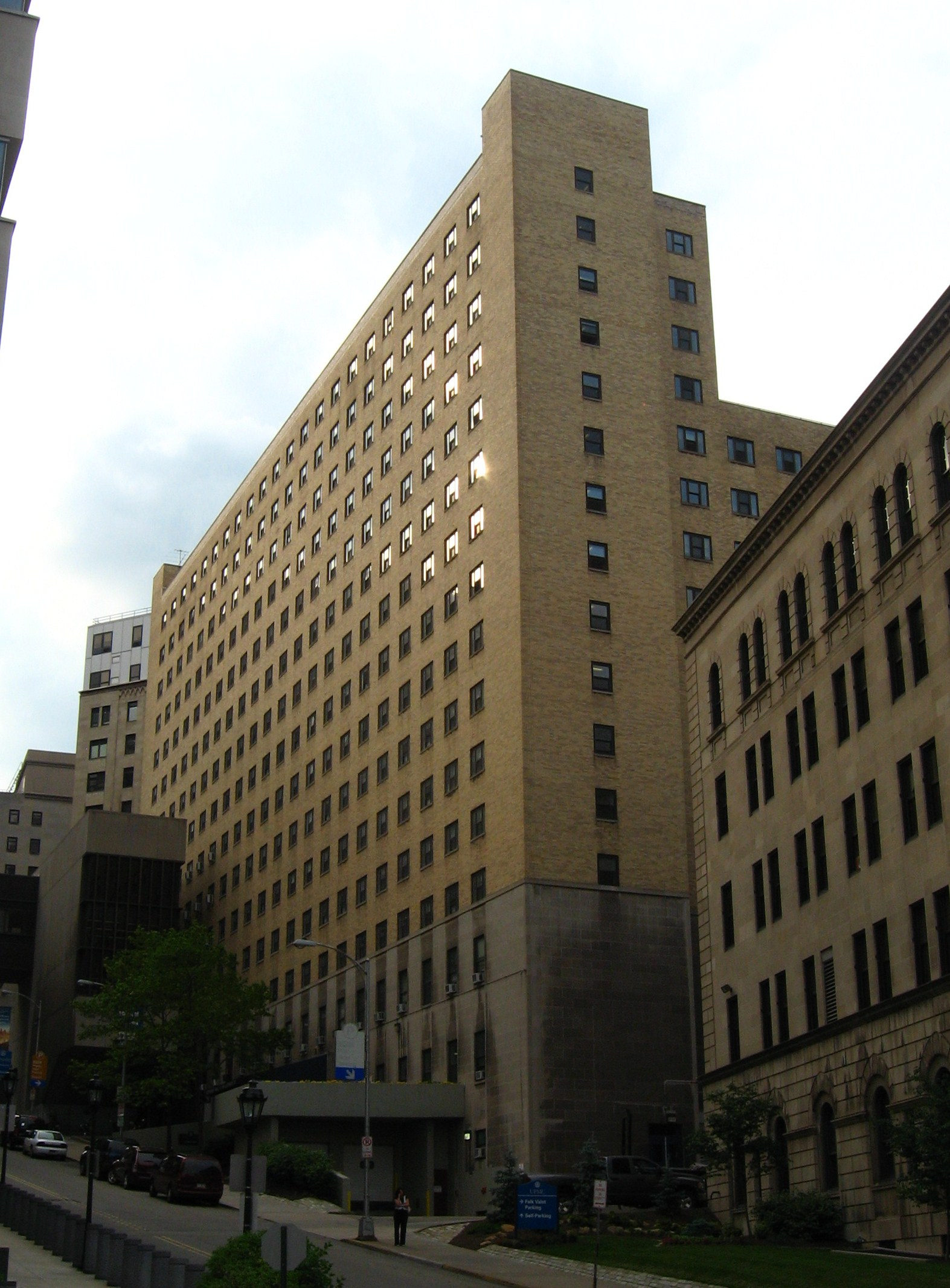
Lothrop Hall at University of Pittsburgh

Lothrop Hall is a major student dormitory at the University of Pittsburgh's main campus in the Oakland neighborhood of Pittsburgh, Pennsylvania. Lothrop Hall is located adjacent to the University of Pittsburgh Medical Center (UPMC) on Lothrop Street near Fifth Avenue, this hill is often referred to as "cardiac hill" due to its steep grade and its accessibility to medical care. The Hall is made up of 14 floors, some of which are segregated by sex in each wing (north and south). Most rooms in the hall are single occupancy (with sinks), with some double occupancy as well, and even some tripled on floors 2–10. The dorm houses 723 people, in addition to a resident director and 15 resident assistants.

== History ==
Previously known as the Nurses' Residence, Lothrop Hall originally served as a 650-room residence hall for University of Pittsburgh nursing students. Construction was begun in 1950 and completed in May 1953 at a cost of $4.5 million ($54.6 million today). The residence was officially dedicated on May 11, 1953, which intentionally corresponded to the 133rd anniversary of the birth of Florence Nightingale. During the dedication, a brick from the Florence Nightingale Home was presented. During financial hardships of the university in the early 1960s, it was one of five buildings mortgaged as security in 1963. By 1976 its name had been changed to the Lothrop Street Residence. By 1979, it was known by its current moniker, Lothrop Hall. Lothrop Street itself is named for Sylvanus Lothrop, a prominent engineer and businessman who constructed the first locks and several major bridges on the Monongahela River in the 1830s and 1840s. During the COVID-19 pandemic, Lothrop Hall was opened to house UPMC doctors and nurses who were working long hours.

== Facilities ==
There is a fitness center, laundry room, student mail center, and e-mail kiosks in the lobby, as well as a lounge on every floor. Soon there will also be a communal kitchen built. The Hall also contains the Gender and Sexuality Living Learning Community and the Nursing Living Learning Community of the University of Pittsburgh. Lothrop Hall is directly connected, via a skywalk, to the School of Nursing in the Victoria Building and adjoining University of Pittsburgh Medical Center facilities. The Hall is appreciated for its mostly single rooms and the sinks in most rooms. The Hall is criticized, however, by its residents for a lack of air conditioning and for its distance from most main Pitt facilities (such as the Cathedral of Learning and the Dining Facilities).

In addition, for many years Lothrop Hall contained medical offices on its lower floors. In 2010, Pitt announced that it had allocated $1.56 million ($2.3 million today) to convert existing office space into 47 additional beds for undergraduate housing in Lothrop. Because of a student housing overflow in 2010, the lounges were converted into 4-person rooms for a total of 52 new beds. In recent years, however, the lounges have been restored to pre-2010 conditions.

Preceded by Fitzgerald Field House	University of Pittsburgh buildings Lothrop Hall; Constructed: 1950-1953	Succeeded by Old Engineering Hall
