= First Church of Christ, Scientist (disambiguation) =

The First Church of Christ, Scientist, in Boston, Massachusetts, U.S., is the administrative headquarters and mother church of the Church of Christ, Scientist.

First Church of Christ, Scientist may also refer to any first Christian Science branch church in a given city, including but not limited to:

== Australia ==
- First Church of Christ, Scientist (Brisbane), Queensland
- First Church of Christ, Scientist (Perth), Western Australia

== Canada ==
- First Church of Christ, Scientist (North Vancouver), British Columbia
- First Church of Christ, Scientist (Ottawa), Ontario
- First Church of Christ, Scientist (Toronto), Ontario

== Hong Kong ==
- First Church of Christ, Scientist (Hong Kong), listed under List of Grade II historic buildings in Hong Kong.

== United Kingdom ==
- First Church of Christ, Scientist (Bournemouth)
- First Church of Christ, Scientist (Brighton)
- First Church of Christ, Scientist (Richmond)
- First Church of Christ, Scientist (London), now Cadogan Hall

== United States ==
=== Arizona ===
- First Church of Christ, Scientist (Phoenix, Arizona)

=== Arkansas ===
- First Church of Christ, Scientist (Little Rock, Arkansas)

=== California ===
- First Church of Christ, Scientist (Berkeley, California)
- First Church of Christ, Scientist (Long Beach, California)
- First Church of Christ, Scientist (Los Angeles, California)
- First Church of Christ, Scientist (Riverside, California)

=== Colorado ===
- First Church of Christ, Scientist (Denver, Colorado), a Denver Landmark

=== Florida ===
- First Church of Christ, Scientist (Cocoa, Florida)
- First Church of Christ, Scientist (Miami, Florida)
- First Church of Christ, Scientist (Orlando, Florida)
- First Church of Christ, Scientist (St. Petersburg, Florida)
- First Church of Christ, Scientist (West Palm Beach, Florida)

=== Georgia ===
- First Church of Christ, Scientist (Atlanta)

=== Illinois ===
- First Church of Christ, Scientist (Chicago, Illinois)
- First Church of Christ, Scientist (Rock Island, Illinois)

=== Iowa ===
- First Church of Christ, Scientist (Davenport, Iowa)
- First Church of Christ, Scientist (Fairfield, Iowa)
- First Church of Christ, Scientist (Grinnell, Iowa)
- First Church of Christ, Scientist (Marshalltown, Iowa)
- First Church of Christ, Scientist (Mason City, Iowa)

=== Indiana ===
- First Church of Christ, Scientist (Huntington, Indiana)

=== Maryland ===
- First Church of Christ, Scientist (Baltimore, Maryland)

=== Massachusetts ===
- First Church of Christ, Scientist (Cambridge, Massachusetts)
- First Church of Christ, Scientist (Dedham, Massachusetts)
- First Church of Christ, Scientist (Newton, Massachusetts)

=== Michigan ===
- First Church of Christ, Scientist (Detroit), now Hilberry Theatre (Wayne State University)
- First Church of Christ, Scientist (Marquette), now Temple Beth Sholom (Marquette, Michigan)

=== Minnesota ===
- First Church of Christ, Scientist (Fairmont, Minnesota), East Blue Earth Avenue
- First Church of Christ, Scientist (Fairmont, Minnesota), Albion Avenue
- First Church of Christ Scientist (Minneapolis, Minnesota)

=== Missouri ===
- First Church of Christ, Scientist (St. Louis, Missouri)

=== Mississippi ===
- First Church of Christ, Scientist (Vicksburg, Mississippi)

=== Nevada ===
- First Church of Christ, Scientist (Reno, Nevada)

=== New York ===
- First Church of Christ, Scientist (New York City)

=== North Carolina ===
- First Church of Christ, Scientist (New Bern, North Carolina)
- First Church of Christ, Scientist (Southern Pines, North Carolina)

=== Ohio ===
- First Church of Christ, Scientist (Cleveland, Ohio)
- First Church of Christ, Scientist (Elyria, Ohio)
- First Church of Christ, Scientist (Lakewood, Ohio)
- First Church of Christ, Scientist (Lebanon, Ohio)
- First Church of Christ, Scientist (Sandusky, Ohio)
- First Church of Christ, Scientist (Toledo, Ohio)

=== Oklahoma ===
- First Church of Christ, Scientist (Oklahoma City)

=== Oregon ===
- First Church of Christ, Scientist (Forest Grove, Oregon)
- First Church of Christ, Scientist (Portland, Oregon)

=== Pennsylvania ===
- First Church of Christ, Scientist (Mt. Lebanon, Pennsylvania)
- First Church of Christ, Scientist (Pittsburgh, Pennsylvania)
- First Church of Christ, Scientist (Scranton, Pennsylvania)

=== Texas ===
- First Church of Christ, Scientist (Paris, Texas)

=== Utah ===
- First Church of Christ Scientist (Salt Lake City, Utah)

=== Washington (state) ===
- First Church of Christ, Scientist (Seattle, Washington)
- First Church of Christ, Scientist (Tacoma, Washington)

=== Wisconsin ===
- First Church of Christ, Scientist (Madison, Wisconsin)
- First Church of Christ, Scientist (Milwaukee, Wisconsin)
- First Church of Christ, Scientist (Neillsville, Wisconsin)
- First Church of Christ, Scientist (Oconto, Wisconsin)

== See also ==
- Church of Christ, Scientist
- First Church of Christ (disambiguation)
- Second Church of Christ, Scientist (disambiguation)
- Third Church of Christ, Scientist (disambiguation)
- Fourth Church of Christ, Scientist (disambiguation)
- Fifth Church of Christ, Scientist (disambiguation)
- Sixth Church of Christ, Scientist (disambiguation)
- Eighth Church of Christ, Scientist
- Seventeenth Church of Christ, Scientist
- List of former Christian Science churches, societies and buildings
