= List of former Christian Science churches, societies and buildings =

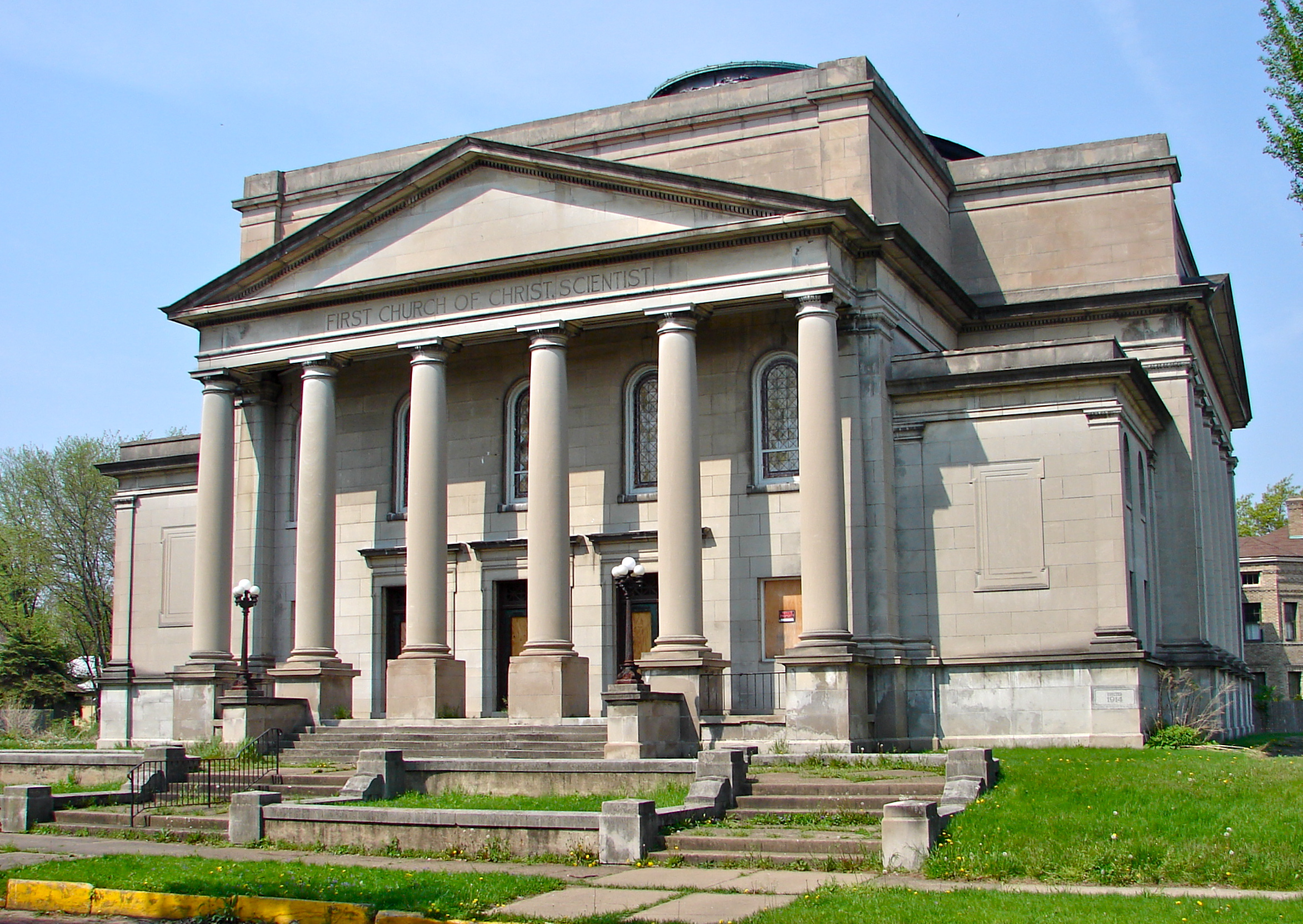
The former First Church of Christ, Scientist (Rock Island, Illinois)

This is a list of former Christian Science churches, societies, and buildings. Following its early meteoric rise, the Christian Science Church suffered a steep decline in membership in the second half of the twentieth century. Though the Church is prohibited by the Manual of The Mother Church from publishing membership figures, the number of branch churches in the United States has fallen steadily since World War II. A 1992 study of the Christian Research Journal found that church membership had fallen from 269,000 in the 1930s to about 150,000. Some believe membership has fallen further since then, however current estimates for church membership vary widely, from under 100,000 to 600,000.

Dr. Stephen Barrett has reported that since 1971, the number of practitioners and teachers listed in the Christian Science Journal has fallen from about 5,000 to about 1,160 and the number of churches has fallen from about 1,800 to about 1,000.

The purpose of this list is to identify and quantify this decline in Christian Science institutions and those related to Christian Science, as well as catalog the buildings and spaces once used by the Christian Science Church. While it is impossible to get accurate membership figures, it is possible to determine the decline in institutions through official church publications and other sources.

== Canada ==
Name	Image	Province	Address	Status	Architecture	Dates	Notes
1st, Lethbridge		Alberta	1203 4th Avenue, South; Lethbridge; 49.69504°N 112.82879°W	Dissolved; building relocated		Local	
1st, North Vancouver		British Columbia	185 Keith Road, North Vancouver; 49.3155°N 123.0711°W	Dissolved	Classical Revival; designed by Honeyman and Curtis	1925–built 1995–North Vancouver-listed	Now North Shore Bethel Christian Mennonite Brethren Church
1st, Vancouver		British Columbia	1160 West Georgia Street, Vancouver; 49.2864°N 123.1248°W	Dissolved	Colonial Revival; designed by Matheson and De Guerre	1918–built 2003–Vancouver-listed	Now Coastal Church

=== Alberta ===
- Second Church of Christ, Scientist, Calgary, Alberta, 617 7th West; Note: Merged with First Church in 1944.

=== Manitoba ===
- Missing from the CS Journal
  - First, Brandon, Manitoba, incorporated 1906
  - Society, Virden, Manitoba, incorporated as First, 1912
  - Second, Winnipeg

=== Ontario ===
- Toronto, Ontario:
  - Second Church of Christ, Scientist, 53 Donlands Avenue (now Wilkinson Jr Public School)
  - Third Church of Christ, Scientist, 70 High Park Avenue (now a condominium tower)
  - Fourth Church of Christ, Scientist, 245 Beech Avenue (now a residence)
  - Sixth Church of Christ, Scientist, met at the former Royal George Theatre, 1219 St Clair Avenue West

=== Saskatchewan ===
- Saskatoon First, 2402 7 St E, building now mixed use commercial, church downgraded to society and meets at #2 1025 Boychuk Dr

== United States ==
Notes:

- In the status column Relocated indicates that a church or society sold its building but did not dissolve or merge. Merged indicates that a church or society merged with another one and relocated.
- The NRHP column is for National Register of Historic Places or state or local listings with the highest one for a property being indicated as follows: Yes = NRHP; CP = contributing property in an NRHP district, State = state, territory, etc., listing; Local = county, city, etc. listing; and No = none of these listings.

Name	Image	Location	Status	Description	Architect	Style	Date
First Church of Christ, Scientist (Birmingham, Alabama)		2031 11th Avenue South, Birmingham, Jefferson County, Alabama	Relocated	Used as office space since relocation.	Wheelock, H. B.	Classical Revival	1911
First Church of Christ, Scientist (Birmingham, Alabama)		3116 Highland Avenue, South; Birmingham, Jefferson County, Alabama	Relocated	Now Independent Presbyterian Church. First Church meets at 209 Oxmoor Circle, Suite 701, Homewood, Alabama	Faulkner, James Draper	Georgian Revival	1950
Christian Science Society (Gadsden, Alabama)		806 Walnut Street; Gadsden, Etowah County, Alabama	Formed 1948 Dissolved 2013	Now occupied by The Walnut Gallery.	?	Carpenter Gothic	1913 ?
First Church of Christ, Scientist (Juneau, Alaska)		430 Main St. corner 5th St. Juneau, Alaska	Dissolved	Sold to State of Alaska, March 2010. Early sale to Juneau Unitarian Universalist Fellowship fell through			1914 or earlier
First Church of Christ, Scientist (Phoenix, Arizona)		924 N. 1st St. Phoenix, Maricopa County, Arizona; 33°27′30″N 112°4′20″W	Relocated	Now Roosevelt Community Church. First Church is now located at 830 North Central Avenue.	Fitzhugh & Byron	Classical Revival	1925 built 1993 NRHP
First Church of Christ, Scientist (Little Rock, Arkansas)		2000 South Louisiana Street, Little Rock, Arkansas; 34°43′46″N 92°16′30″W	Dissolved	became the Little Rock Community Church	Almand, John Parks	Mixed	1919 built 1994 NRHP
First Church of Christ, Scientist (Long Beach, California).		440 Elm Ave, Long Beach, Los Angeles County, California	Formed 1904 Dissolved	Seated 900. Now First Christian Church. First Church of Christ, Scientist, now holds services at 3629 Atlantic Avenue, Long Beach	Grey, Elmer	Classical Revival	1913 built Local
Second Church of Christ, Scientist (Long Beach, California)		655 Cedar Ave., Long Beach, Los Angeles County, California; 33°44′55″N 118°11′35″W	Dissolved	Seated 1400. Now the Second Samoan Congregational Church.	Shields, Fisher and Lake	Classical Revival	1924 built 2005 NRHP
Third Church of Christ, Scientist, Long Beach, California		3000 Eliot Street, now 3000 E Third Street, Long Beach, California	Incorporated 1920 Dissolved	Seated 400. Now Arabic Bible Christian Church.		Classical Revival	1921 built
First Church of Christ, Scientist 1901, Los Angeles, California		635-639 West 17th Street, Los Angeles	Incorporated 1898 Relocated 1912	Seated 600. The building was outgrown by 1912. It was a United Brethren church for many years. The entry below is for the new building.	Martin, M. Paul	Classical Revival	1901 built
First Church of Christ 1912, Scientist Los Angeles, California		1366 South Alvarado Street, Los Angeles, California	Relocated 1912 Merged 1972 Dissolved 2004	Seated 1300. The congregation merged with 25th Church in 1972 and took 25th's location. Now the Iglesia Adventista Central.	Grey, Elmer	Mixed	1912 built 1971 LAHCM; 1984 NRHP-CP
Second Church of Christ, Scientist, Los Angeles, California		948 W. Adams Blvd., Los Angeles, California	Incorporated 1898 Dissolved 2002	Seated 1200. Now The Art of Living Foundation	Rosenheim, Alfred H.	Classical Revival	1910 built LAHCM 57 1968
Third Church of Christ, Scientist, Los Angeles, California	library photo	730 S Hope Street, Los Angeles, California	Incorporated 1909 Relocated	Seated 2000. The church purchased Simpson Auditorium in 1910 and built a new entrance. It was razed after being damaged by the 1971 Sylmar earthquake.	Apponyi, Charles Edward		1889 built
Fourth Church of Christ, Scientist (Los Angeles, California)		5206 N. Figueroa Street, Highland Park, Los Angeles, Los Angeles County, California	Incorporated 1909 Dissolved 1988	Now Mystic Dharma Buddhist Temple. Fourth Church met for a time at the Highland Park Ebell Clubhouse before dissolving.	Milwaukee Building Company, aka Meyer & Holler	Classical Revival	1924 built
Fifth Church of Christ, Scientist 1912, Los Angeles, California		7107 Hollywood Boulevard, Los Angeles (Hollywood), California	Incorporated 1909 Rebuilt 1959	Seated 1000. Replaced by new building at the same location in 1959.	Meline, Frank	Greek Revival	1915 built
Fifth Church of Christ, Scientist 1959, Los Angeles, California		7107 Hollywood Boulevard, Hollywood, Los Angeles, Los Angeles County, California	Incorporated 1909 Relocated	Seated 814. Now Mosaic Baptist church. Fifth Church meets at 5850 West 3rd St., Unit B	Elwell, Howard	Mid-Century Modern	1959 built
Tenth Church of Christ, Scientist, Los Angeles, California		936 West 49th Street, Los Angeles, California	Incorporated 1917 Dissolved 1965	Seated 926 after 1931 remodel. Now St. John Baptist Church. 19th and 44th Churches merged and took the name of 10th Church in 1967 at a new location.	Howard, George A.	Greek Revival	1918 built 1930-1931 remodeled
Twelfth Church of Christ, Scientist, Los Angeles, California		14654 Hamlin Street, Van Nuys, Los Angeles, Los Angeles County, California	Incorporated 1922 Dissolved	Now Canoga Park Seventh Day Adventist Church	Meyer & Holler	Spanish Mission	1931-1932 built
Thirteenth Church of Christ, Scientist, Los Angeles, California		1750 North Edgemont Street, Los Feliz, Los Angeles, Los Angeles County, California	Incorporated 1921 Relocated	Now a Full Gospel Church. Thirteenth Church meets at 1776 Vermont Avenue.	Allison & Allison	Italian Revival	1930 built
Fourteenth Church of Christ, Scientist, Los Angeles, California		3690 Motor Avenue, Los Angeles, California	Incorporated 1922 Dissolved 2017	Seated 412. Replaced with Los Angeles Fire Dept. Station 43.	Hunter, Paul R.		1952 built
Nineteenth Church of Christ, Scientist, Los Angeles	library photo	1650 Federal Avenue, Los Angeles, California	Formed 1915 Merged in 10th 1967	Seated 285. Originally a society, in 1915 it became 1st Church, Sawtelle. When Sawtelle was annexed by Los Angeles, it became 19th Church. Replaced with an apartment complex.	Parr, F. H. P	Mission Revival	1928-1929 built
Twenty-Fifth Church of Christ, Scientist, Los Angeles		1014 South Cochran Avenue, Los Angeles, California	Incorporated 1927 Merged 1972 Dissolved 2004	Seated 1100. Sold to Yeshiva Gedolah's High School in 1999. Twenty-Fifth Church merged into First Church.	Kelley, H. Roy	Georgian Revival	1933 built
Twenty-Sixth Church of Christ, Scientist, Los Angeles		470 North St. Andrews Place, Los Angeles, California	Formed 1928 Dissolved 1985	Seated 966. Now Wilton Korean Presbyterian Church.	Meyer & Holler		1929 built
Twenty-Eighth Church of Christ, Scientist, Los Angeles		1018 Hilgard Ave., Los Angeles, California 90024	Incorporated 1929 Reduced attendance	The 1955 Lyndon designed auditorium building was demolished in 2017, a Sunday School and Reading Room remain.	Lyndon, Maynard	Mid-Century Modern with integrated courtyards and landscaping	1955 built
Second Church of Christ, Scientist (San Francisco, California)		651 Dolores St., San Francisco, San Francisco County, California	Organized 1908 Relocated 2012	Seated 1000. Converted to condos in 2016. Second Church now meets at 2287 Mission St.	Crim, William H.	Beaux Arts and Classical Revival	1916 built
Third Church of Christ, Scientist, San Francisco	agency photos	1250 Haight Street, San Francisco, California	Incorporated 1909 Dissolved 1996	Currently senior housing owned by Tenderloin Neighborhood Development Corporation (TNDC)		Romanesque Revival	1915 built
Fourth Church of Christ, Scientist, San Francisco		300 Funston Ave., San Francisco, San Francisco County, California	Organized 1912 Dissolved 2017	Now houses the Internet Archive	Werner, Carl	Classical Revival	1923 built
Sixth Church of Christ, Scientist, San Francisco	wikimapia photos	2116 Divisadero Street, San Francisco, California	Incorporated 1913 Dissolved 1973	Seated 1000. Now houses Iglesia ni Cristo.	Crim, William H.	Greek Revival	1923-1925 built
Eighth Church of Christ, Scientist, San Francisco	2012 newsletter image	1984 Great Highway, San Francisco, California	Incorporated 1917 Dissolved 1991	Now houses the Growing Tree School		Cottage	1905 built
Twelfth Church of Christ, Scientist (San Francisco, California)		60 Onondaga Ave. San Francisco, San Francisco County, California	Incorporated 1942 Dissolved 1971	Now the Croatian American Cultural Center			
Fourth Church of Christ, Scientist (Denver, Colorado)		3101 W. 31st Ave, Denver, Denver County, Colorado; 39°45′40″N 105°1′37″W	Dissolved	Now the Zen Center of Denver	Hoyt and Hoyt	Renaissance	1921 built 2004 NRHP-listed
Second Church of Christ, Scientist (Hartford, Connecticut)		129 Lafayette Street Hartford, Hartford County, Connecticut	Relocated	Now owned by the State of Connecticut. Second Church holds services in its Reading Room.	Allen, Isaac A., and Son	Georgian Revival	1927
First Church of Christ, Scientist (Old Saybrook, Connecticut)		25 Old Boston Post Road Old Saybrook, Middlesex County, Connecticut	Dissolved	Now owned by Rich Carter and Steve Robson	Burton, Frank		1950
First Church of Christ, Scientist (Rehobeth, Delaware)		801 Bayard Ave Rehobeth Beach, Delaware 19971	Dissolved	Sold to STELLAZ2 LLC for $2.75 million and demolished.			1956
First Church of Christ, Scientist (Cocoa, Florida)		121 Derby Street Cocoa, Brevard County, Florida	Relocated	Building at 121 Derby Street, bought in 1955 from the Seventh-Day Adventists, is now the Historic Derby Street Chapel. First Church relocated to 235 Indian River Drive.	Russell, Alonzo Bruce	Craftsman	1924
First Church of Christ, Scientist (Jacksonville, Florida)		101 W 1st St (formerly 1116 N Laura St), Jacksonville, Duval County, Florida	Dissolved	Voluntarily dissolved August 10, 1993 Its former building is now the Jacksonville branch of the Karpeles Manuscript Library Museum	Marsh and Saxelbye	Classical Revival	1921 built 1986 NRHP-CP
First Church of Christ, Scientist, Miami		1836 Biscayne Blvd., Miami, Miami-Dade County, Florida	Relocated	Sold in 2012 for $6.25 million. Building will be preserved and reused as a retail space with a 38-story condo tower built above and partially around it. First church now meets in its reading room at 15 West Flagler Street in Miami.	Geiger, August C.	Classical Revival	1925 built ___NRHP eligible
First Church of Christ, Scientist (Surfside, Florida)		228 89th St, corner of Harding Ave., Surfside, Miami-Dade County, Florida	Delisted, withdrew from The Mother Church, changed name and relocated.	Current name is Church of Christ Jesus and Mary Baker Eddy Christian Science, Inc. Services are held at Christian Science Endtime Center in Denver, Colorado Its former building is now the Casa de Jesus.		Florida modern	1953
First Church of Christ, Scientist (Orlando, Florida)		24 North Rosalind Avenue Orlando, Orange County, Florida	Relocated	Now St. George Antiochian Orthodox Church. First Church relocated to 915 North Ferncreek .	Dunham, George Foote	Classical Revival	1926-27 built 1980 NRHP
First Church of Christ, Scientist (St. Petersburg, Florida)		253 Fifth Avenue, North St. Petersburg, Pinellas County, Florida	Relocated	Now the Palladium at St. Petersburg College. First Church is relocated to 6333 1st Street, Northeast.	Cheney, Howard Lovewell	Romanesque Revival	1925 built 2003 NRHP-CP
Second Church of Christ, Scientist (St. Petersburg, Florida)		6099 Central Avenue St. Petersburg, Pinellas County, Florida	Merged	Building at 6099 Central Avenue is now FreeFall Theatre. Second Church merged with First Church at 6333 1st Street, Northeast.			
First Church of Christ, Scientist (Chicago, Illinois)		4017 S. Drexel Blvd, Chicago, Cook County, Illinois	Dissolved	Now the Grant Memorial AME Church	Beman, Solon Spencer	Classical Revival	1897 built
Third Church of Christ, Scientist (Chicago, Illinois)		2151 W Washington Blvd, Chicago, Cook County, Illinois	Dissolved	Now the Metropolitan Missionary Baptist Church	Garden, Hugh M.G.	Classical Revival	1899 built 1989 CL; 2016 NRHP
Fourth Church of Christ, Scientist (Chicago, Illinois)		6659 S. Harvard Ave., Chicago, Cook County, Illinois	Dissolved	Sold to Canaan Baptist Church of Christ in 1960.	Beman, Solon Spencer	Classical Revival	1904 built ___Local
Fifth Church of Christ, Scientist (Chicago, Illinois)		4840 S. Dorchester Ave., Chicago, Cook County, Illinois	Dissolved	Later the Shiloh Missionary Baptist Church and Salem Baptist Church. Now developed for 13 townhomes, May 2015.	Beman, Solon Spencer	Classical Revival	1904 built
Sixth Church of Christ, Scientist (Chicago, Illinois)		11321 S. Prairie Ave., Chicago, Cook County, Illinois		Now Mission of Faith Baptist Church.	Beman, Solon Spencer		1910-12
Seventh Church of Christ, Scientist (Chicago, Illinois)		5318 N. Kenmore Ave., Chicago, Cook County, Illinois		Demolished before 1979.	Beman, Solon Spencer		1907-08
Eighth Church of Christ, Scientist (Chicago, Illinois)		4359 S. Michigan Ave., Chicago, Cook County, Illinois		Later the Centennial Missionary Baptist Church. Sold in 2021.	Stanhope, Leon	Classical Revival	1908/1910-11
Ninth Church of Christ, Scientist (Chicago, Illinois)	Postcard image	6154 S. Woodlawn Ave., Chicago, Cook County, Illinois	Dissolved	First Church and Ninth Church merged in 1949, and retained the First Church name. Ninth's building was sold to St. John Baptist Temple in 1956, and Christ Church Chicago in 2020.	Barkhausen, Carl	Classical Revival	1916
Tenth Church of Christ, Scientist (Chicago, Illinois)	Tenth Church of Christ, Scientist (Chicago, Illinois)	5640 S. Blackstone Ave., Chicago, Cook County, Illinois		Sold to St. Stephen's Church of God in the 1960s. Sold and resold to a string of developers since 1997. Owned by developer John Liu since 2015.	Coolidge & Hodgdon	Classical Revival	1917
Eleventh Church of Christ, Scientist (Chicago, Illinois)		2840 W. Logan Blvd., Chicago, Cook County, Illinois	Dissolved	Now Central Hispanic Seventh-Day Adventist Church (Iglesia Adventista Hispana Central).	Stanhope, Leon	Neo-classical Revival	1918
Twelfth Church of Christ, Scientist, Chicago		623 Grace Street, Chicago, Illinois	Incorporated 1913 1921 Aeolian Hall 1926 Grace Street Dissolved by 2000	Replaced by Grace Street Towers apartments	Cheney, Howard Lovewell	Greek Revival	1925-1926
Sixteenth Church of Christ, Scientist (Chicago, Illinois)		7201 N. Ashland Blvd., Chicago, Cook County, Illinois	Relocated	Now the Apostolic Catholic Assyrian Church of the East, Saint George Parish. Sixteenth Church is now located at 7036 N. Ridge Avenue	Cheney, Howard Lovewell	Classical Revival	1924
Eighteenth Church of Christ, Scientist (Chicago, Illinois)		7262 S.Coles Ave, Chicago, Cook County, Illinois	Dissolved	Purchased by St. Luke Missionary Baptist Church in 1971.	Faulkner, Charles Draper	Byzantine Revival	1926
First Church of Christ, Scientist (Evanston, Illinois)	1912 photo at Newberry Library	1490 Chicago Ave., Evanston, Cook County, Illinois	Dissolved	Now Nichols Concert Hall of the Music Institute of Chicago	Beman, Solon Spencer	Classical Revival	1912
First Church of Christ, Scientist (Riverside, Illinois)	Photos from The Prairie School Traveler	135 Longcommon Road, Riverside, Cook County, Illinois	Dissolved	Now a private residence.	Cheney, Howard Lovewell	Prairie School	1920 built
First Church of Christ, Scientist (Rock Island, Illinois)		700 22nd Street, Rock Island, Rock Island County, Illinois	Dissolved	Now a Karpeles Manuscript Library Museum	Jones, William C.	Palladian	1914-15 built 1998 NRHP-CP
First Church of Christ Scientist (Skokie, Illinois)	1953 Architectural Rendering from Illinois Digital Archives	7800 Niles Ave., Skokie, Cook County, Illinois	Dissolved	Now Devar Emet Messianic Synagogue	Kroeber, Walter	Mid-century Modern	1962 built
First Church of Christ, Scientist (Wheaton, Illinois)		327 North Main St, Wheaton, DuPage County, Illinois	Dissolved	Now vacant. Part of Saint John Lutheran Church campus		Classical Revival	1905 built
First Church of Christ, Scientist (Huntington, Indiana)		815 Warren St., Huntington, Huntington County, Indiana	Dissolved	Listed as a Society for most of its history, a Church for several years in the 1920s, then a Society. Dissolved between 1988 and 1993, when the building was donated to be the Dan Quayle Center.			
First Church of Christ, Scientist (Kokomo, Indiana)		300 E. Mulberry Street Kokomo, Howard County, Indiana	Relocated	Now the Sycamore Reformed Presbyterian Church. CS Society meets at 1521 W. Lincoln			1924 built
First Church of Christ, Scientist (Muncie, Indiana)		326 W Charles Street Muncie, Delaware County, Indiana	Dissolved	Now the Rainbow Cathedral, which wants to sell the building	Crabb, Everett H.	Renaissance Revival	1929 built
First Church of Christ, Scientist (Anita, Iowa)		812 3rd Street, Anita, Cass County, Iowa	Dissolved	Now the Anita Public Library			1931 built No, eligible
First Church of Christ, Scientist (Cedar Rapids, Iowa)		1246 2nd Ave. SE. Cedar Rapids, Linn County, Iowa; 41°59′06.2″N 91°39′21.2″W	Relocated	The First Christian Science congregation in Iowa. Now The City Church. First Church relocated to 640 Blairs Ferry Road, NE.		Classical Revival	1915 built 2017 NRHP
First Church of Christ, Scientist (Davenport, Iowa)		636 Kirkwood Boulevard Davenport, Scott County, Iowa; 41°32′11″N 90°33′54″W	Relocated	Now the Harvest Time Family Worship Center. First Church relocated to 3705 Fairhaven Road.	Clausen and Clausen	Classical Revival	1912 built 1984 NRHP
First Church of Christ, Scientist (Fairfield, Iowa)		300 East Burlington Ave, Fairfield, Jefferson County, Iowa	Dissolved	Now St. Gabriel and All Angels Liberal Catholic Church			1927 built ___No, eligible
First Church of Christ, Scientist (Marshalltown, Iowa)		412 W Main St, Marshalltown, Marshall County, Iowa	Dissolved	Bulldozed in August, 1985.	Garden, Hugh M.G.	Prairie School	1903 built 1979 NRHP; 1985 demolished 1998 NRHP-delisted
First Church of Christ, Scientist (Mason City, Iowa)		23 3rd St, N.W., Mason City, Cerro Gordo County, Iowa	Dissolved	Now professional offices	Smith, Clyde W.		1928 built 2005 NRHP
First Church of Christ, Scientist (Shreveport, Louisiana)		3201 Centenary Boulevard Shreveport, Caddo Parrish, Louisiana	Relocated	Now a Karpeles Manuscript Library Museum. First Church relocated to 3424 Line Avenue	?	?	1930
First Church of Christ, Scientist (Atchison, Kansas)		401 Santa Fe St., Atchison, Atchison County, Kansas	Dissolved	Now the Presbyterian Community Center and is home to Theatre Atchison.	?	Classical Revival	1913 built
Christian Science Church (Chatham, Massachusetts)		805 Main Street, Chatham, Barnstable County, Massachusetts	Relocated	Now the Unitarian Universalist Meeting House of Chatham. There is a CS Journal listing for First Church, Harwich-Chatham, located in Harwich Port.	Unknown		
Mary Baker Eddy Home		400 Beacon Street, Chestnut Hill, Newton, Middlesex County, Massachusetts	Dissolved	Sold to the Longyear Foundation, which is now restoring it.	Peabody and Stearns, 1880; Solon Spencer Beman, 1907		1880 built 1986 NRHP
First Church of Christ, Scientist (Newton, Massachusetts)		391 Walnut St., Newtonville, Newton, Middlesex County, Massachusetts	Relocated	Now Oxford House apartments. Building at 391 Walnut Street was sold for $1,050,000 to be converted into apartments. First Church now meets at 1141 Walnut St, Newton Highlands	Densmore, LeClear and Robbins	Georgian Revival	1940 built 1986 NRHP-CP
First Church of Christ, Scientist (Dedham, Massachusetts)		619 High Street, Dedham, Norfolk County, Massachusetts	Dissolved	Now professional offices		Georgian Revival	1939 built
First Church of Christ, Scientist, Worcester		880 Main Street; Worcester, Worcester County, Massachusetts		Now Cultural Center Hrisohorafiton Alexander the Great, a Greek cultural center			
First Church of Christ Scientist (Battle Creek, Michigan)		226 Capital Ave NE Battle Creek, Calhoun, County, Michigan	Relocated	Now The Potters House Church. First Church is now located at 99 North Ave.			
First Church of Christ Scientist (Detroit)		4743 Cass Avenue, Detroit, Wayne, County, Michigan	Relocated	Sold in 1961 to Wayne State University and now houses the university's Hillberry Theatre	Smith, Hinchman & Grylls	Neoclassical	1917 built 1978 NRHP-CP
First Church of Christ Scientist (Kalamazoo, Michigan)		Corner of South & Park sts. Kalamazoo, Kalamazoo, County, Michigan	Relocated	Since 2006 owned by Kalamazoo Institute of Arts, which has rented it out to churches. First Church relocated to 1225 Portage Street	Jones, William C.	Neoclassical	1913-1914 built
First Church of Christ, Scientist (Marquette, Michigan)		223 Blaker St., Marquette, Marquette County, Michigan		Now The Citadel.	Anderson, David	Neo Greek Revival	1926 built
First Church of Christ, Scientist, 1897 (Minneapolis, Minnesota)		614-620 15th Street, East, Minneapolis, Hennepin County, Minnesota	Relocated later dissolved	Demolished in August 2022	Bowler, Septimus J.	Mixed	1897 built 1986 NRHP
First Church of Christ, Scientist, 1914 (Minneapolis, Minnesota)		2315 Nicollet Ave (Nicollet Ave & E 24th St) Minneapolis, Hennepin County, Minnesota	Dissolved	Now the Minneapolis First Seventh-day Adventist Church.	Beman, Solon Spencer		1914 built
Fourth Church of Christ, Scientist (Minneapolis, Minnesota)		3100 Park Avenue South (31st St E and Park Avenue S), Minneapolis, Hennepin County, Minnesota		Now All God's Children Metropolitan Community Church (MCC)			
First Church of Christ, Scientist (Fairmont, Minnesota)		222 E Blue Earth Ave, Fairmont, Martin County, Minnesota	Dissolved	Now the Red Rock Center for the Arts. Church sold building in 1937 and moved to a second building at 205 Albion Avenue, but later dissolved.	Jones, Harry Wild	Richardsonian Romanesque	1898 built 1986 NRHP
First Church of Christ, Scientist, Albion Avenue (Fairmont, Minnesota)		205 Albion Ave, Fairmont, Martin County, Minnesota	Dissolved	Now the Lakeview Funeral Home.	Faulkner, Charles Draper	Georgian Revival	1937 built
First Church of Christ, Scientist (Duluth, Minnesota)		902 East 1st St, Duluth, St. LouisCounty, Minnesota	Relocated	Now a Karpeles Manuscript Library Museum			1912 built
First Church of Christ, Scientist (Natchez, Mississippi)		206 Main Street, Natchez, Adams County, Mississippi	Dissolved	As of 1973, the church was located in the former Commercial Bank, which was declared a National Historic Landmark that year. The church is no longer in existence.	Unknown	Greek Revival	1833 built 1974 NRHP; 1974 NHL
Second Church of Christ, Scientist, St. Louis, Missouri		5807 Murdoch Avenue, St. Louis, Missouri	Incorporated 1902 Dissolved 1990	Seated 650. Now a branch bank.	Schoelmann, Carl F.	Neoclassical	1941 built
Third Church of Christ, Scientist, St. Louis, Missouri		3524 Russell Boulevard, St. Louis, Missouri	Incorporated 1906 Dissolved 1985	Became The New Paradise Missionary Baptist Church, then a Karpeles Manuscript Library. In 2019 it was badly burned and may be demolished.		Greek Revival	1911 built
Fourth Church of Christ, Scientist, St. Louis, Missouri		5569 Page Boulevard, St. Louis, Missouri	Incorporated 1908 Dissolved 1980	Seated 1000. Now Solomon's Temple Church.	Groves, Albert B.	Italian Renaissance	1910 built
Fifth Church of Christ, Scientist, St. Louis, Missouri	1946 museum photo	3452 Potomac, St. Louis, Missouri	Incorporated 1914 Dissolved 2000	Seated 250. Now the Metro Christian Worship Center.			
First Church of Christ, Scientist (Butte, Montana)		229 North Montana Street, Butte, Silver Bow County, Montana	Unknown	Sold September 15, 2014	Arnold, Walter	Classical Revival	1920 built ___ CP
First Church of Christ, Scientist (Reno, Nevada)		501 Riverside Drive, Reno, Washoe County, Nevada; 39°31′27″N 119°49′6″W	Relocated	Now the Lear Theater. First Church relocated to 795 West Peckham Lane.	Williams, Paul Revere	Classical Revival	1939 built 1999 NRHP
Christian Science Pleasant View Home		227 Pleasant St, Concord, Merrimack County, New Hampshire	Dissolved	Now a profit-making retirement home.	Bowditch, Arthur H., building; Arthur Asahel Shurcliff, landscaping	Georgian Revival	1926 built 1984 NRHP
Christian Science Society (Cape May, New Jersey)		34 Gurney St, corner of Columbia St, Cape May, Cape May County, New Jersey	Dissolved	Now a bed and breakfast	Button, Stephen Decatur	Gothic Revival	1869-70 built 1970 NRHP-CP
First Church of Christ, Scientist (Plainfield, New Jersey)		905 Prospect Ave, corner E 9th St. PlainfieldUnion County, New Jersey	Delisted, withdrew from The Mother Church, changed name	Now Plainfield Christian Science Church, Independent. Dropped from the CS Journal in 1977.	unknown	Georgian Revival	unknown
First Church of Christ, Scientist (Buffalo, New York)		220 North St., Buffalo, Erie County, New York	Relocated/Merged	Now a Karpeles Manuscript Library Museum. Relocated in 1992, then merged in 1996 with First Church, Kenmore	Solon S. Beman	Classical Revival	1912 built ___Local
First Church of Christ, Scientist (New York, New York)		One West 96th Street at Central Park West Manhattan, New York County, New York	Merged	In 2003 First Church of Christ, Scientist merged with Second Church of Christ, Scientist. The merged CS congregation now uses the name First Church but worships at the former Second Church on 68th Street. The building at 96th Street was then the Crenshaw Christian Center and later sold to the Children's Museum.	`		
Fourth Church of Christ, Scientist (New York City)		551 Ft. Washington Avenue, corner of 185th Street, Washington Heights, Manhattan, New York County, New York	Dissolved	Now Hebrew Tabernacle of Washington Heights	Cherry and Matz		
Ninth Church of Christ, Scientist (New York City)		223 East 25th Street, Manhattan, New York County, New York		Former fire house purchased at a city auction in 1973. Sold to a developer in 2018 and converted into a residential building	Napoleon LeBrun & Sons	Victorian Gothic	1883
Second Church of Christ, Scientist (Staten Island, New York)		13 New Dorp Lane New Dorp Staten Island, Richmond County, New York	Dissolved				
First Church of Christ, Scientist (Southern Pines, North Carolina)		240 E. New Hampshire Avenue, Southern Pines, Moore County, North Carolina	Relocated	Sold in 2018; now Church of the Advent (Anglican)		Colonial Revival	1928 built 1991 NRHP-CP
First Church of Christ, Scientist (Cleveland, Ohio)		2200 Overlook Road,41°30′11″N 81°35′59″W in the University Circle area of Cleveland, Cuyahoga County, Ohio	Incorporated 1891 Relocated	Now the headquarters of Nottingham•Spirk Design Associates. First Church is now located at 3181 Fairmount Boulevard.	Walker and Weeks		
Second Church of Christ, Scientist, Cleveland, Ohio		7710 Euclid Avenue, Cleveland, Ohio		Merged with First Church in 2004. Now occupied by Church of God and True Holiness.	Striebinger, Frederick N.	Classical Revival	1916 built
Third Church of Christ, Scientist (Cleveland, Ohio)		3648 W 25th St (now 3648 Pearl Rd), Cleveland, Cuyahoga County, Ohio	Organized 1903 Dissolved 1992	Vacant in 1907. Now Bethlehem Temple of Praise Church.	Striebinger, Frederick N.	Classical Revival	1906 built
First Church of Christ, Scientist (Lakewood, Ohio)		15422 Detroit Ave, Lakewood, Cuyahoga County, Ohio	Dissolved	Now the 15422 LTD Building	Faulkner, Charles Draper		
First Church of Christ, Scientist (Sandusky, Ohio)		28 East Adams St, Sandusky, Erie County, Ohio	Dissolved	Now Emmanuel Temple Church, affiliated with the Pentecostal Assemblies of the World			
First Church of Christ, Scientist (Toledo, Ohio)		2704 Monroe Street41°39′42″N 83°33′56″W Toledo, Lucas County, Ohio	Relocated	Now the United Missionary Baptist Church of Toledo. First Church is now located at 4647 West Central Avenue, Ottawa Hills	Yost and Packard		1898 built 1978 NRHP
First Church of Christ, Scientist (Lebanon, Ohio)		342 Columbus Avenue. 39°26′16″N 84°11′56″WLebanon, Warren County, Ohio	Relocated	Now the Mohrman-Jack-Evans House, a house museum. First Church is now a CS Society and meets at 109 West Mulberry Street			1850 built 1984 NRHP
First Church of Christ, Scientist (Oklahoma City, Oklahoma)		1200 N. Robinson Ave, Oklahoma City, Oklahoma County, Oklahoma	Relocated	Now vacant. First church meets at 4700 North Portland.		Classical Revival	1920 built
First Church of Christ, Scientist, Portland, Oregon		1813 NW Everett St, Portland, Oregon, Multnomah County, Oregon	Incorporated 1883 Dissolved 1991	Now the Northwest Neighborhood Cultural Center (NWNCC).	Beman, Solon Spencer	Classical Revival	1909 built 1978 NRHP
Second Church of Christ, Scientist, Portland, Oregon	Photo	531 NE Holladay Avenue, Portland, Oregon	Formed 1897 Dissolved	Seated 1000. Now a 9 story mixed use building.	Dunham, George Foote	Classical Revival	1914 built
Third Church of Christ, Scientist, Portland, Oregon		1722 SE Madison Street, Portland, Oregon	Incorporated 1912 Dissolved 1997	Seated 950. Occupied by World Buddhist Preaching Association in 1995.	Purcell, William Gray		1924-1927 built
Eighth Church of Christ, Scientist, Portland, Oregon		3505 NE Multnomah Street, Portland, Oregon	Incorporated 1924 Merged 2020	Seated 900. Congregation merged with Tenth Church, renumbered itself as First Church, and moved. Old building is now Word of Life Slavic Baptist Church.	Ertz, Charles W.	Spanish Renaissance	1925-1926 built
First Church of Christ, Scientist (Forest Grove, Oregon)		1904 Pacific Ave, Forest Grove, Washington County, Oregon	Dissolved	Now an office building The church congregation no longer exists.	Beman, Spencer, son of Solon Spencer Beman		
First Church of Christ, Scientist (Pittsburgh, Pennsylvania)		635 Clyde Street Pittsburgh, Allegheny, Pennsylvania	Relocated	Building was sold to the University of Pittsburgh and is now Pitt's University Child Development Center. First Church now meets at 201 North Dithridge.	Beman, Solon Spencer	Classical Revival	1904 built ___Local
First Church of Christ, Scientist (Scranton, Pennsylvania)		520 Vine Street Scranton, Lackawanna County, Pennsylvania	Relocated	Now the Lackawanna County Children's Library. First Church is now Christian Science Society, Scranton, and meets at 335 North Washington Avenue.	Ward, Albert J.		
First Church of Christ, Scientist (El Paso, Texas)		2800 San Diego Ave., El Paso, Texas	Dissolved	Sold in 2026.	Unknown		1940
First Church of Christ, Scientist (Paris, Texas)		339 West Kaufman, Paris, Lamar County, Texas	Dissolved	Vacant in 1988. Now being used by a Spanish-speaking Baptist congregation.	Unknown		
First Church of Christ, Scientist (Salt Lake City, Utah)		352 East 300 South (352 East Broadway), Salt Lake City, Salt Lake County, Utah	Dissolved	It is no longer listed in the Christian Science Journal, After being used for a time by Anthony's Fine Art and Antiques, the building is once again being used as a church: Iglesia La Luz del Mundo	Ware, Walter E.	Richardsonian Romanesque	1898 built ___NRHP
First Church of Christ Scientist (Hampton, Virginia)		2808 Kecoughtan Road, Hampton, Virginia	Dissolved	Sold in 2022 to Zion Community Church.	Unknown	Georgian Colonial Revival	1950
First Church of Christ, Scientist (Seattle, Washington)		1519 East Denny Way / 1841 16th Avenue, Capitol Hill neighborhood of Seattle, King County, Washington	Relocated	Now a housing complex called The Sanctuary. First Church relocated to 900 Thomas Street	Heath, Frederick	Classical Revival	1906-08 built 1977 SL
Fourth Church of Christ, Scientist (Seattle, Washington)		1119 8th Ave, Seattle, King County, Washington	Dissolved	Sold by the church in 1998 for $1,600,000. Now Town Hall Seattle	unknown	Classical Revival	1916-22 built
Fifth Church of Christ, Scientist (Seattle, Washington)		3515 S Alaska St (corner of 36th Ave, S), Seattle, King County, Washington	Dissolved	Now the Rainier Valley Cultural Center	Roberts, Earl A.	Mixed	1921 built 1980 NRHP-CP
Sixth Church of Christ, Scientist (Seattle, Washington)		2656 42nd Avenue, SW, Seattle, King County, Washington	Merged	Building is now the Sanctuary at Admiral and is a venue for weddings and banquets. Sixth Church merged with Fourteenth Church of Christ, Scientist	Field, Gerald C.	Art Deco	1929 built 2010 SL
Seventh Church of Christ, Scientist (Seattle, Washington)		2555 8th Ave, West (corner of W Halladay St), Seattle, King County, Washington	Merged	Now the Seattle Church of Christ. Seventh Church merged with Third Church of Christ, Scientist.	Thomas, Harlan	Mixed, Octagon	1926 built
First Church of Christ, Scientist (Neillsville, Wisconsin)		132 E 4th St, Neillsville, Clark County, Wisconsin	Dissolved	current use unknown	Corbey, L. J.	Classical Revival	1916 built 2003 NRHP
First Church of Christ, Scientist (Madison, Wisconsin)		315 Wisconsin Ave. 43°4′39″N 89°23′13″W Madison, Dane County, Wisconsin	Relocated	Now occupied by a marketing and advertising agency. First Church relocated to 610 South Segoe Road	Riley, Frank M. Riley	Classical Revival	1929 built 1982 NRHP
First Church of Christ, Scientist (Milwaukee, Wisconsin)		1443-1451 North Prospect Ave, Milwaukee, Milwaukee County, Wisconsin	Dissolved	Now the 1451 Renaissance Place	Beman, Solon Spencer	Classical Revival	1907 built 1989 NRHP
Second Church of Christ, Scientist (Milwaukee, Wisconsin)		2722 W. Highland Blvd., Milwaukee, Milwaukee County, Wisconsin	Dissolved	Now St. Luke Emmanuel Baptist Church	Carl Barkhausen	Classical Revival	1913 built 1986 NRHP
Third Church of Christ, Scientist (Milwaukee, Wisconsin)		2915 N Sherman Blvd., Milwaukee, Milwaukee County, Wisconsin	Relocated	Now Schrager Auction Gallery. Third Church relocated to 9911 W Good Hope Rd.	Frank Howend	Classical Revival	1923 built
Fourth Church of Christ, Scientist (Milwaukee, Wisconsin)		3069 North Downer Ave, Milwaukee, Milwaukee County, Wisconsin	Relocated	Now the Chinese Christian Church of Milwaukee. Fourth Church relocated to 2011 East Capitol Drive, Shorewood, Wisconsin.	Faulkner, Charles Draper	Georgian Revival	1930 built
Fifth Church of Christ, Scientist (Milwaukee, Wisconsin)		3025 W. Oklahoma Ave., Milwaukee, Milwaukee County, Wisconsin	Relocated	Now Veritas, a public charter high school, that built an addition in front. Fifth Church relocated to 6611 W. Oklahoma Ave.	H. C. Hardser	Classical Revival	1950 built
Sixth Church of Christ, Scientist (Milwaukee, Wisconsin)		1036 N. Van Buren St. 43°2′42″N 87°54′17″W Milwaukee, Milwaukee County, Wisconsin	Dissolved	Now Metrobrook Church.	Grey, Elmer	Mixed	1902 built ___NRHP

=== Florida ===
- First Church of Christ, Scientist, Fort Pierce, Florida, on January 31, 1996, sold its church edifice at 911 Sunrise Boulevard for $110,000 to The Pentecostal Church of God in America, Florida District, Inc., d/b/a Glad Tidings Pentecostal Church of God, by warranty deed recorded in Official Records Book 997, page 2392, St. Lucie County, Florida, public records, as accessed online September 5, 2007. First Church is no longer in existence.
- First Church of Christ Scientist, Holmes Beach, Florida, voluntary dissolution, April 5, 2004
- First Church of Christ, Scientist, Lake Worth, Florida, 918 N lakeside Drive, voluntarily dissolved, May 7, 2004 The building is now the Victory Believer's Chapel

=== Iowa ===
- First Church of Christ, Scientist (Fort Dodge, Iowa) is now the home of the Hawkeye Community Theatre.
- First Church of Christ, Scientist (Humboldt, Iowa) is now a private residence at 25½ N. 6th Street.

=== Kansas ===
- First Church of Christ, Scientist (Wichita, Kansas) is now the Grand Chapel, a nonreligious wedding venue.
- Christian Science Church (Lawrence, Kansas) is now the Cat Clinic (pet supply).

=== New Jersey ===
- First Church of Christ, Scientist (Maplewood, New Jersey) is now the Burgdorff Cultural Center and a realtor office.

=== Utah ===
- First Church of Christ, Scientist (Provo, Utah) is now the Provo Community Theater.

=== West Virginia ===
- First Church of Christ, Scientist (Wheeling, West Virginia), 99 14th Street, is now the Agape Baptist Church.

=== Churches or societes where status was changed ===
==== Merged into another church or society ====
- First Church of Christ, Scientist, Hollywood, Florida, with Christian Science Society (Hollywood, Florida)

==== Downgraded to societies ====
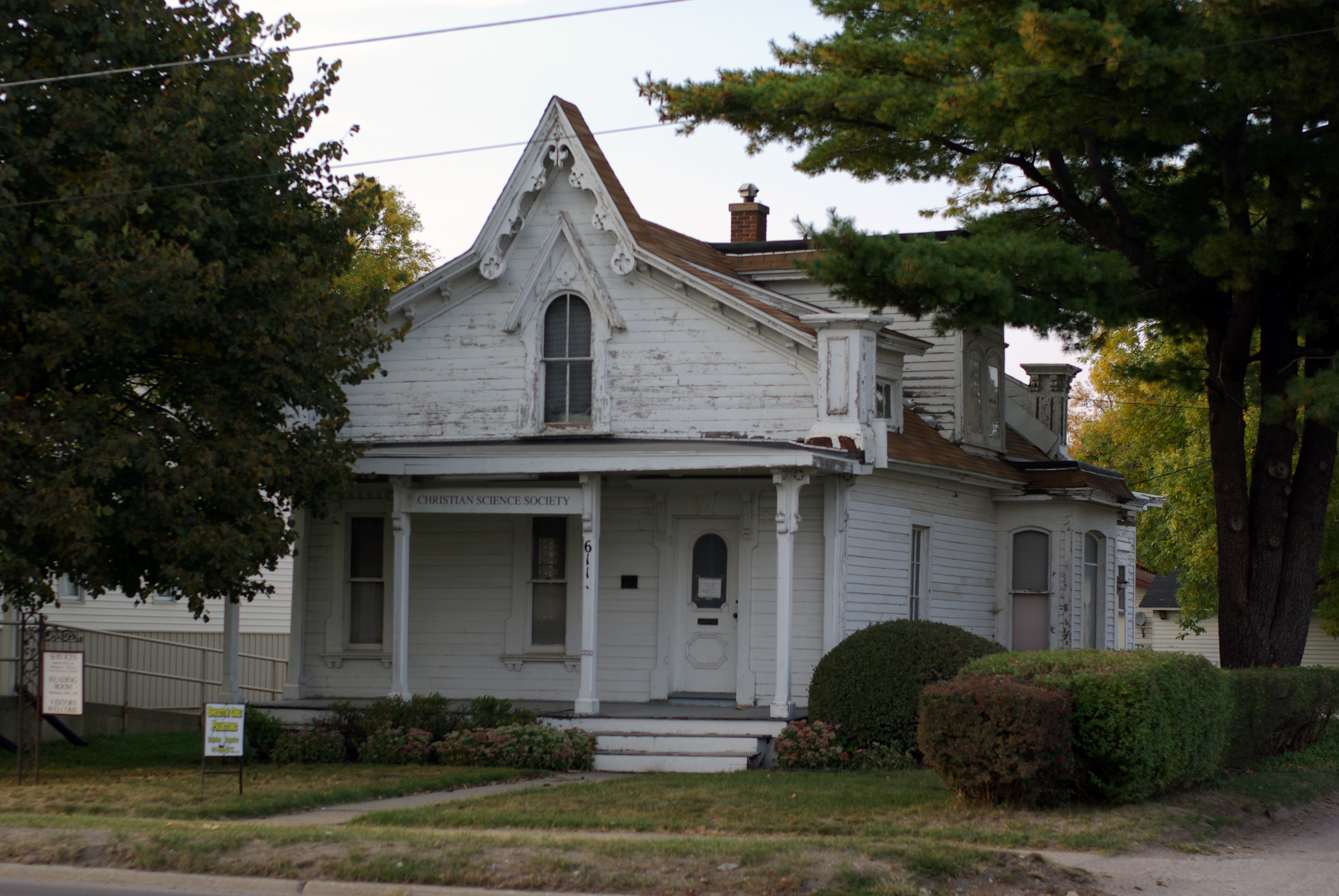
Christian Science Society (Grinnell, Iowa)

- First Church of Christ, Scientist (Grinnell, Iowa) is now Christian Science Society (Grinnell, Iowa)
- First Church of Christ, Scientist, Hudson, New York, is now Christian Science Society, Hudson, New York.
- First Church of Christ, Scientist (Oconto, Wisconsin) on the National Register, is now Christian Science Society, Oconto, Wisconsin.

==== In transition ====
- Alvin, Texas, First Church at 713 South Lee Street is listed for sale as vacant as of December 7, 2007. The February 2007 Christian Science Journal listed a Christian Science Society at that address.

==== Others ====
- Camp Sangamon and its sister camp, Camp Betsey Cox, both located in Pittsford, Vermont, were originally run by Christian Scientists for the children of Christian Scientists. Today there are no religious restrictions.
- Christian Science Benevolent Association on the West Coast, was one of 2 BAs operated by the Mother Church.In 1973, it was turned over to a local group of Christian Scientists who continue to operate it as Arden Wood nursing home.
- Daycroft School in Greenwich, Connecticut, closed in 1991.
- Mary Baker Eddy Birthplace Monument, Bow, New Hampshire The large granite monument erected on the site was dynamited by order of the CS Board of Directors.

== United Kingdom ==
The date in the "Deregistered" column is the month and year in which the building's registration for worship in accordance with the Places of Worship Registration Act 1855 was formally cancelled. If there is no date, the church has not been formally deregistered.

Name	Image	Location	Deregistered	Status	Notes
First Church of Christ, Scientist, Bexhill-on-Sea		Bexhill-on-Sea, East Sussex; 50.8402°N 0.4809°E	July 2000	Demolished	An Edwardian Baroque-style church built in 1930–31. Closed in 1995 and demolished for flats in 2001.
First Church of Christ, Scientist, Birmingham		Birmingham, West Midlands; 52.4762°N 1.9665°W	July 2000	In religious use	Registered as Sandon Road Methodist Church in 1999.
Second Church of Christ, Scientist, Birmingham		Birmingham, West Midlands; 52.4772°N 1.9122°W	December 1986	In secular use	The Grade II-listed building dates from 1848–49 and was originally a Presbyterian chapel. It is now a nightclub called Popworld Birmingham.
Fourth Church of Christ, Scientist, Birmingham		Birmingham, West Midlands; 52.4076°N 1.9264°W	March 1971		Associated Sunday School remained registered for worship until March 1980
First Church of Christ, Scientist, Bolton		Bolton, Greater Manchester; 53.5751°N 2.4161°W	August 2012	In religious use	Now a mosque (Jamia Alavia Bolton)
First Church of Christ, Scientist, Bradford		Bradford, West Yorkshire		In secular use	Moved to a Grade II-listed villa built between 1830 and 1840 after the original church closed was deregistered in November 1979. This closed around 2012 and the building is now used by a drug rehabilitation service and is known as The Vault.
Second Church of Christ, Scientist, Bradford		Bradford, West Yorkshire; 53.7992°N 1.7577°W	January 1998		
First Church of Christ, Scientist, Bristol		Bristol, Avon; 51.4628°N 2.5896°W	January 1972	Demolished	
Third Church of Christ, Scientist, Bristol		Bristol, Avon; 51.4625°N 2.6171°W	March 1980	In secular use	Occupied part of a residential building
First Church of Christ, Scientist, Bromley		Bromley, Greater London; 51.4063°N 0.0201°E	May 2014	Vacant	A Grade II-listed building designed in 1928 in an "inventive Neoclassical style" by William Braxton Sinclair.
First Church of Christ, Scientist, Burnley		Burnley, Lancashire	March 1976		
First Church of Christ, Scientist, Bury		Bury, Greater Manchester; 53.5933°N 2.3023°W	March 1990	In religious use	Now The Manna House, used by Bury Christian Fellowship
First Church of Christ, Scientist, Buxton		Buxton, Derbyshire	January 1998		
First Church of Christ, Scientist, Camberley		Camberley, Surrey	June 1990		
First Church of Christ, Scientist, Cardiff		Cardiff, South Glamorgan	August 1988	In religious use	Now the Crwys Presbyterian Church of Wales.
First Church of Christ, Scientist, Chiswick		Chiswick, Greater London	July 2000		
First Church of Christ, Scientist, Colchester		Colchester, Essex	January 1976		
First Church of Christ, Scientist, Eastbourne		Eastbourne, East Sussex; 50.7657°N 0.2820°E		In secular use	Registered in 1922 and rebuilt and extensively refurbished in the late 1970s by local firm Benz and Williams. The church was put up for sale in 2018 and has been converted to residential use.
Second Church of Christ, Scientist, Eastbourne		Eastbourne, East Sussex	August 1961		
First Church of Christ, Scientist, East Grinstead		East Grinstead, West Sussex; 51.1259°N 0.0075°W	February 1986	In secular use	A congregation became established in 1930 and took over a former school building, registering it for worship in 1939. It closed in 1985 and has been converted into an office.
First Church of Christ, Scientist, Falmouth		Falmouth, Cornwall	November 2002		
First Church of Christ, Scientist, Ferndown		Ferndown, Dorset	September 2000	Demolished	
First Church of Christ, Scientist, Gloucester		Gloucester, Gloucestershire	July 1993		
Second Church of Christ, Scientist, Halifax		Halifax, West Yorkshire	October 1957		
First Church of Christ, Scientist, Hartlepool		Hartlepool, County Durham	February 1974		
First Church of Christ, Scientist, Hastings and St Leonards-on-Sea		Silverhill, St Leonards-on-Sea; 50.8671°N 0.5548°E	March 1996	In secular use	A permanent church was built on Sedlescombe Road South in the Silverhill area in 1970, replacing a series of earlier buildings. It was registered for worship between April 1970 and March 1996, after which it was converted into offices; permission to demolish the building was refused in 2018.
First Church of Christ, Scientist, Hendon		Hendon, Greater London	December 1979		
First Church of Christ, Scientist, Heysham		Heysham, Lancashire	October 2003		
First Church of Christ, Scientist, High Wycombe		High Wycombe, Buckinghamshire	October 2003		
First Church of Christ, Scientist, Ilford		Ilford, Greater London	October 2003		
First Church of Christ, Scientist, Hull		Kingston upon Hull, East Yorkshire	January 2002		
Third Church of Christ, Scientist, Leeds		Leeds, West Yorkshire	November 1984	In religious use	Re-registered as the New Testament Church of God Pentecostal church in May 1985
First Church of Christ, Scientist, Leicester		Leicester, Leicestershire	November 2006		
First Church of Christ, Scientist, Leytonstone		Leytonstone, Greater London	March 1923		
First Church of Christ, Scientist, Liverpool		Liverpool, Merseyside; 53.3902°N 2.9138°W		In secular use	Registered in 1920. Not formally deregistered, but in use as a dance studio and nursery school since 1990.
Third Church of Christ, Scientist, Liverpool		Liverpool, Merseyside; 53.3959°N 2.9705°W	August 2012	In religious use	Now St Peter and St Paul's Church, used by the traditionalist Catholic group the Society of Saint Pius X. A Grade II-listed building designed by W.H. Ansell and opened in 1914.
First Church of Christ, Scientist, London		London; 51.4936°N 0.1576°W	May 2019	In secular use	This Grade II listed building on Sloane Terrace on the Chelsea/Belgravia border is now Cadogan Hall, a concert hall. The church closed in 1996. It was designed between 1904 and 1909 by Robert Chisholm.
Fourth Church of Christ, Scientist, London		London	August 1978	In secular use	This occupied part of a building in Hampstead.
Sixth Church of Christ, Scientist, London		London; 51.4621°N 0.2230°W	October 1999	In secular use	This church was in the Putney area of the city. After closure it was altered internally and converted into flats called Bounty Hall, but from the outside it remains "an imposing building in a warm orange-brown brick ... in a modern interpretation of a stripped-down Classical style".
Eighth Church of Christ, Scientist, London		London; 51.4611°N 0.1175°W	October 1990	In religious use	This was located in the Brixton area and was registered in November 1931. After closure it was re-registered as the Universal Pentecostal Church.
Ninth Church of Christ, Scientist, London		London; 51.4965°N 0.1290°W	March 1997	In religious use	This Grade II*-listed building on Marsham Street in Westminster was designed between 1926 and 1930 in a Byzantine Revival style by Herbert Baker and was registered for worship in April 1930. It is now Emmanuel Evangelical Church, having been re-registered as The Emmanuel Centre in February 1997.
First Church of Christ, Scientist, Manchester		Manchester, Greater Manchester; 51.4621°N 0.2230°W		In secular use	This was the first purpose-built Christian Science church in Britain. Construction began in 1903 and was largely complete in 1907, and the church was registered in 1910. Architect Edgar Wood's individualistic building, with a mixture of Expressionist and Art Nouveau influences, has been described as "unmatched for originality in the country". It is Grade I-listed. Although never formally deregistered, it closed in 1971 and became offices called the Edgar Wood Centre.
Fifth Church of Christ, Scientist, Manchester		Manchester, Greater Manchester	February 1978		
First Church of Christ, Scientist, Norwich		Norwich, Norfolk	November 2006		
First Church of Christ, Scientist, Orpington		Orpington, Greater London	October 2003		
First Church of Christ, Scientist, Rochester		Rochester, Kent	October 1991		
First Church of Christ, Scientist, Sandbach		Sandbach, Cheshire	March 1997		
First Church of Christ, Scientist, Seaford		Seaford, East Sussex	July 2000		
First Church of Christ, Scientist, Sevenoaks		Sevenoaks, Kent	April 2018	Demolished	Building demolished by 2014.
First Church of Christ, Scientist, Shrewsbury		Shrewsbury, Shropshire	March 1983		
First Church of Christ, Scientist, South Shields		South Shields, Tyne and Wear	December 1979		
First Church of Christ, Scientist, Stockport		Stockport, Greater Manchester	April 2018		
First Church of Christ, Scientist, Sutton		Sutton, Greater London	January 1981	In secular use	The building became the Secombe Theatre, which closed in 2016. The church congregation re-registered the former reading room building as a church in 1982, but this has also closed.
First Church of Christ, Scientist, Swansea		Swansea, Glamorgan	April 1985		
First Church of Christ, Scientist, Torquay		Torquay, Devon	October 1989		
First Church of Christ, Scientist, Wallasey		Wallasey, Merseyside	March 1982		
First Church of Christ, Scientist, Warrington		Warrington, Cheshire	April 1985		
First Church of Christ, Scientist, Wigan		Wigan, Greater Manchester	September 1963		
First Church of Christ, Scientist, Windermere		Windermere, Cumbria	May 1993		
First Church of Christ, Scientist, Wolverhampton		Wolverhampton, West Midlands	August 2012		
First Church of Christ, Scientist, Worthing		Worthing, West Sussex; 50.8216°N 0.3735°W		In religious use	The church was designed in 1939 by Brundrit and Stewart and was formally registered accordingly in 1958. A hall had been built on the site on Broadwater Road in 1921, succeeding a hired hall in the town centre which had been used since 1910; the new hall was registered for worship in 1923 when the congregation had the status of a Christian Science Society. The church, an Art Deco-style brick building, remained in Christian Scientist use until its closure in 1987, after which it was sold to an Evangelical congregation which by 1998 was known as Broadwater Christian Fellowship but which became known as River of Life Church in September 2003.
Second Church of Christ, Scientist, Worthing		Worthing, West Sussex; 50.8175°N 0.3953°W	October 2015	Demolished	A Christian Science reading room opened in 1939 in a converted house and was registered for worship in 1940. It was replaced by a Sunday School building in 1951 and then by a purpose-built church in 1960. It closed in September 2010 and was demolished in 2015 (although its registration was not formally cancelled until 2015). Houses were planned for the site, but in 2013 permission was granted for the construction of a Kingdom Hall for Jehovah's Witnesses.

== Missing churches in all countries ==
Note: Following the custom of early New England Congregational and Baptist churches, Churches of Christ, Scientist, in a city or town are numbered First, Second, Third, etc. Societies are not numbered, however. Since all churches and societies are listed in the monthly Christian Science Journal, it is possible to determine the numbers of most but not all missing churches. For example, if a city has listings for only second and fourth churches, at least the first and third are missing. As merged churches take the name of the older congregation, first could then be assumed to have dissolved, while third might have dissolved or merged with second. Fifth may have merged, dissolved, or never existed.

=== A-B-C ===
- Berlin, Germany Fourth through Tenth
- Birmingham, England First.
- Chicago, Illinois Fourth, Sixth, Ninth, Tenth, Twelfth through Fifteenth.
- Cleveland, Ohio Second Church.

=== D-E-F ===
- Dallas, Texas First, Second, Fourth and Sixth
- Denver, Colorado Second through Fifth
- Duluth, Minnesota Second
- El Paso, Texas Second
- Evanston, Illinois, First.

=== G-H-I ===
- Houston, Texas Second, Third, Fifth and Sixth.
- Indianapolis, Indiana Second.

=== J-K-L ===
- Jacksonville, Florida, Third.
- Kansas City, Missouri First through Third, Fifth, Eighth and Ninth.
- Leeds, West Yorkshire, England Second.
- Liverpool, England First and Second.
- London, England, Fourth through Tenth
- Long Beach, California Second and Third.
- Los Angeles, California First, Fourth, Seventh, Eighth, Eleventh, Fifteenth through Nineteenth, Twenty-First through Twenty-Seventh, Twenty-Ninth through Thirty-Fifth, Thirty-Seventh, Thirty-Ninth, Fortieth, Forty-Second and Forty-Third churches.

=== M-N-O ===
- Manchester, England First and Third.
- Milwaukee, Wisconsin First and Second.
- Minneapolis, Minnesota Fifth through Sixth.
- New York, New York, includes Manhattan and Bronx: Fourth, Sixth, and Eleventh through Fifteenth
- Oakland, California Second through Ninth.

=== P-Q-R ===
- Philadelphia, Pennsylvania Third through Fifth.
- Plainfield, New Jersey First, see Independent or secessionist churches above.
- Portland, Oregon First through Fifth, Seventh and Ninth.
- Pretoria, South Africa First.

=== S-T-U-V ===
- Sacramento, California Third and Fourth.
- Saint Louis, Missouri, Second through Fifth and Seventh.
- San Antonio, Texas, Second
- San Diego, California Third and Fifth.
- San Francisco, California Third, Sixth through Eighth and Tenth through Twelfth.
- São Paulo, Brazil, Third
- Seattle, Washington Second, Fourth through Sixth, Eighth, Ninth and Eleventh.
- Thunder Bay, Ontario First
- Tulsa, Oklahoma Second through Fifth.
- Tucson, Arizona Second.
- Vancouver, British Columbia, First and Third

=== W-X-Y-Z ===
- Washington, D.C. Second.
- Whittier, California First. (This church was located at the southeast corner of Bailey Street and Washington Avenue. It is now the Good Shepherd Bible Church.)
- Worthing, West Sussex, England, First.
- Zurich, Switzerland, First.

== See also ==
- First Church of Christ, Scientist (disambiguation)
- Second Church of Christ, Scientist (disambiguation)
- Fourth Church of Christ, Scientist (disambiguation)

== Bibliography ==
- Bartley, L.J. (1971). The Story of Bexhill. Bexhill: F.J.Parsons Ltd.
- Elleray, D. Robert (1998). A Millennium Encyclopaedia of Worthing History. Worthing: Optimus Books. ISBN 0-9533132-0-4.
- Elleray, D. Robert (2004). Sussex Places of Worship. Worthing: Optimus Books. ISBN 0-95-331-3271.
- Hartwell, Clare; Hyde, Matthew; Pevsner, Nikolaus (2004). Manchester and the South-East. The Buildings of England. London: Yale University Press. ISBN 0-300-10583-5.
- Leppard, M.J. (2001). A History of East Grinstead. Chichester: Phillimore & Co. Ltd. ISBN 1-86077-164-5.
