= First Church of Christ, Scientist (Forest Grove, Oregon) =

Historic church in Oregon, United States

- First Church of Christ Scientist
- U.S. National Register of Historic Places
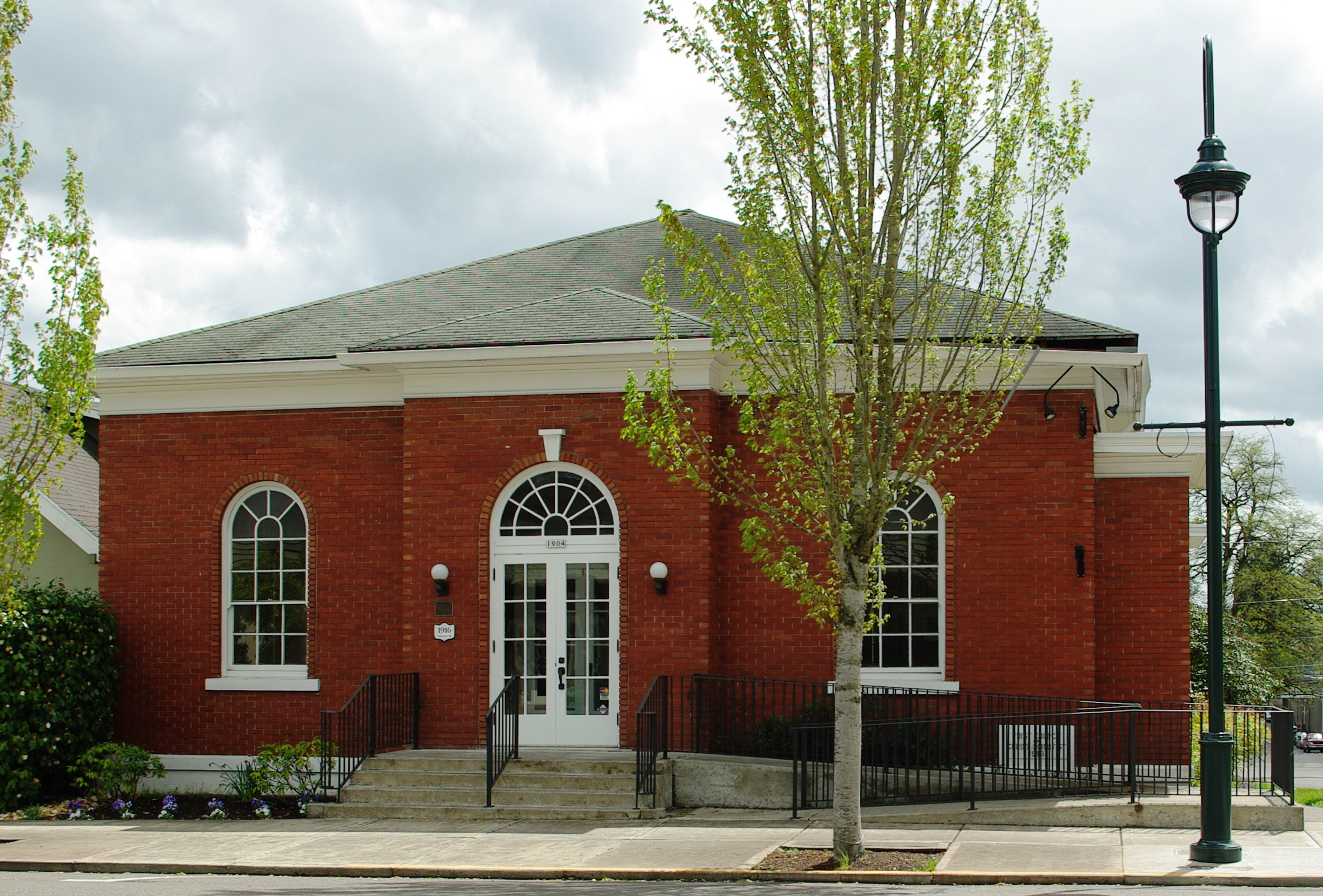
- Building in 2009

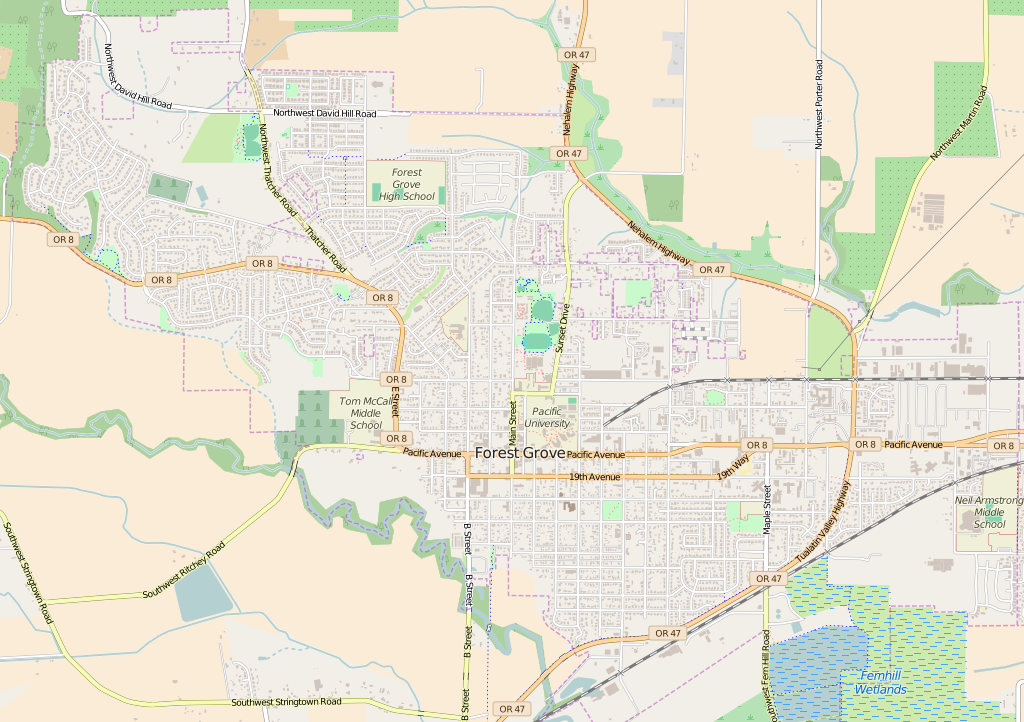
- Location within the United States Location within Oregon Location within Forest Grove OR
- Location: 1904 Pacific Avenue; Forest Grove, Oregon
- Coordinates: 45°31′10.8″N 123°6′45.16″W
- Built: 1916
- Architect: Spencer S. Beman; James S. Loynes
- Architectural style: Colonial Revival
- NRHP reference No.: 93001505
- Added to NRHP: January 21, 1994

The former First Church of Christ, Scientist in Forest Grove, Oregon, United States, is a historic Christian Science church built in 1916. It was designed by Spencer S. Beman, son of the noted designer of Christian Science churches, Solon Spencer Beman who had died in 1914. On January 21, 1994, it was added to the National Register of Historic Places.

== History ==
First Church of Christ Scientist, Forest Grove was designed by Chicago architect Spencer S. Beman, son and partner of architect, Solon Spencer Beman.

== Current use ==
First Church of Christ Scientist, Forest Grove was downgraded to the Christian Science Society, Forest Grove, but is no longer an active Christian Science congregation.

== See also ==
- List of Registered Historic Places in Oregon
- First Church of Christ, Scientist (disambiguation)
- List of former Christian Science churches, societies and buildings
