= First Church of Christ, Scientist (Lakewood, Ohio) =

Church in Ohio, United States

Coordinates: 41°29′08″N 81°48′17″W

General information
- Architectural style: Colonial Revival
- Location: Lakewood, Ohio, United States
- Completed: 1922
- Client: First Church of Christ, Scientist

Design and construction
- Architect: Charles Draper Faulkner

The First Church of Christ, Scientist, built in 1922, was a historic Classical Revival style Christian Science church located at 15422 Detroit Avenue, on the northeast corner of Detroit and Arthur avenues, across from the Public Library in Lakewood, Ohio. The building's massive entrance portico is supported by six Doric columns. It was designed by noted Chicago-based architect Charles Draper Faulkner, who was renowned for the churches and other buildings that he designed in the United States and Japan. He designed over 33 Christian Science church buildings and wrote a book called Christian Science Church Edifices which features this church as well as many others.

In 2005, the building was bought by 15422 LTD, which has renovated it for commercial use. The building was acquired by and served as the headquarters of the Maxxum Group, but is now used by King's Church, a nondenominational church. First Church of Christ, Scientist, Lakewood is no longer in existence.

== See also ==
- List of former Christian Science churches, societies and buildings
- First Church of Christ, Scientist (disambiguation)
