= Third Church of Christ, Scientist =

Third Church of Christ, Scientist may refer to any third Christian Science branch church in a given city, including but not limited to:

== In the United Kingdom ==
- Third Church of Christ, Scientist (Liverpool, England), on Listed buildings in Liverpool
- Third Church of Christ, Scientist (London), no longer functions as a church

== In the United States ==
- Third Church of Christ, Scientist (Chicago, Illinois) is now Metropolitan Missionary Baptist Church
- Third Church of Christ, Scientist (Cleveland, Ohio)
- Third Church of Christ, Scientist (Washington, D.C.)

== See also ==
- First Church of Christ, Scientist (disambiguation)
