= First Church of Christ, Scientist (Oklahoma City) =

Historic church in Oklahoma, United States

- U.S. National Register of Historic Places
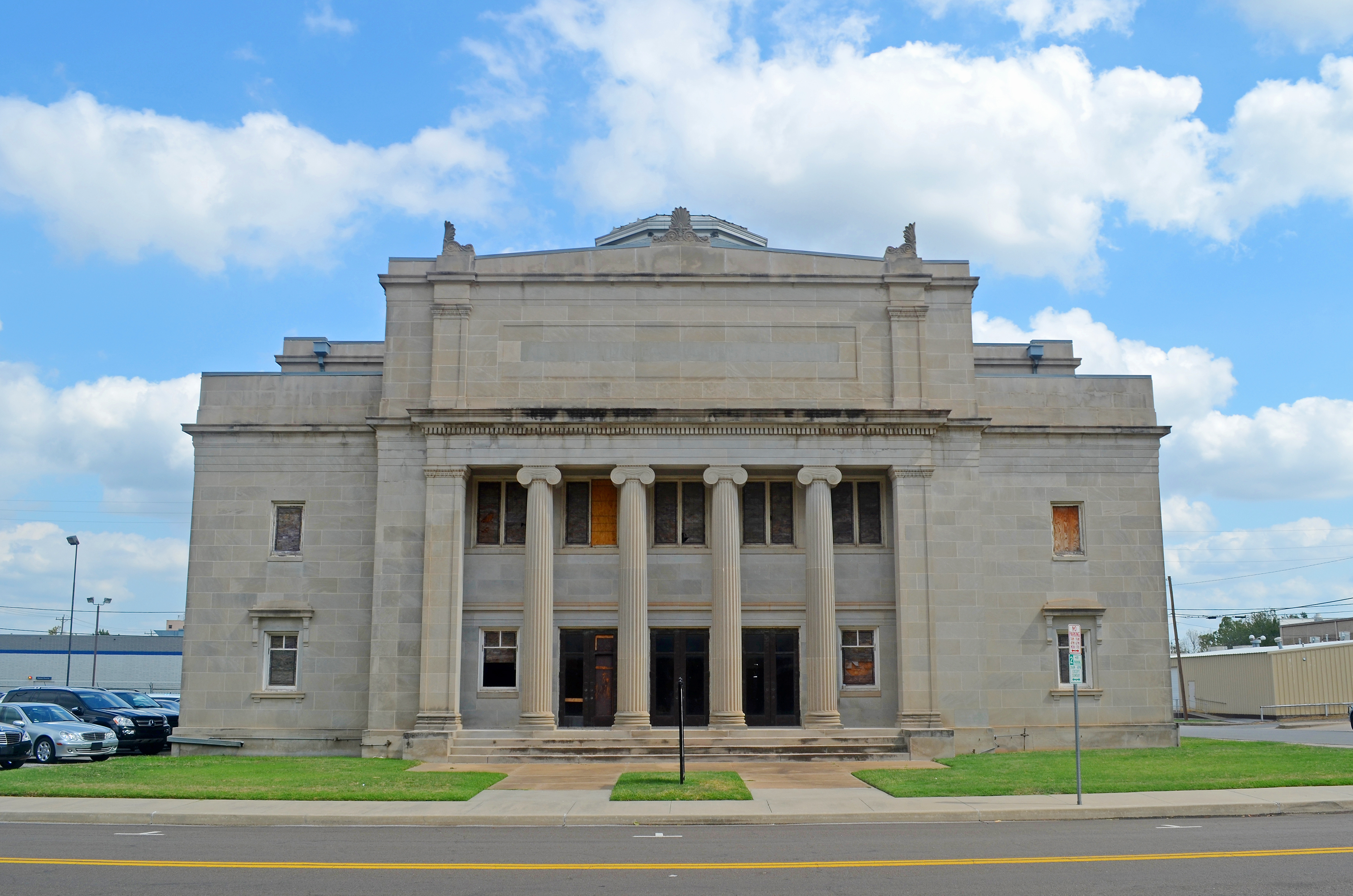
- First Church of Christ, Scientist building located at Robinson Ave and NW 11th St

- Location within Oklahoma Location within the United States
- Location: 1200 N. Robinson Avenue; Oklahoma City, Oklahoma
- Coordinates: 35°29′7″N 97°31′8.76″W
- Built: 1922
- Architectural style: Classical Revival
- NRHP reference No.: 01000949
- Added to NRHP: September 9, 2001

The former First Church of Christ, Scientist is an historic Christian Science church building located at 1200 North Robinson Avenue in Oklahoma City, Oklahoma, United States. Built in 1920, it was designed in the Classical Revival style of architecture. On September 9, 2001, was added to the National Register of Historic Places.

== National register listing ==
- First Church of Christ, Scientist (added 2001 - Building - #01000949)
- Also known as Center for Design Arts
- 1200 N. Robinson Ave., Oklahoma City
- Historic Significance: Architecture/Engineering
- Architectural Style: Classical Revival
- Area of Significance: Architecture
- Period of Significance: 1900-1924
- Owner: Private
- Historic Function: Religion
- Historic Sub-function: Religious Structure
- Current Function: Work In Progress

== Current status ==
Oklahoma City businessman and tax attorney, Travis Watkins, purchased the former First Church of Christ, Scientist building at 1200 N. Robinson in August, 2018 as the headquarters of Travis W. Watkins Tax Resolution & Accounting Firm. First Church of Christ, Scientist now holds services at 4700 North Portland.

== See also ==
- National Register of Historic Places listings in Oklahoma County, Oklahoma
- List of former Christian Science churches, societies and buildings
- First Church of Christ, Scientist (disambiguation)
