= First Church of Christ, Scientist (Mt. Lebanon, Pennsylvania) =

Coordinates: 40.3697°N 80.0498°W

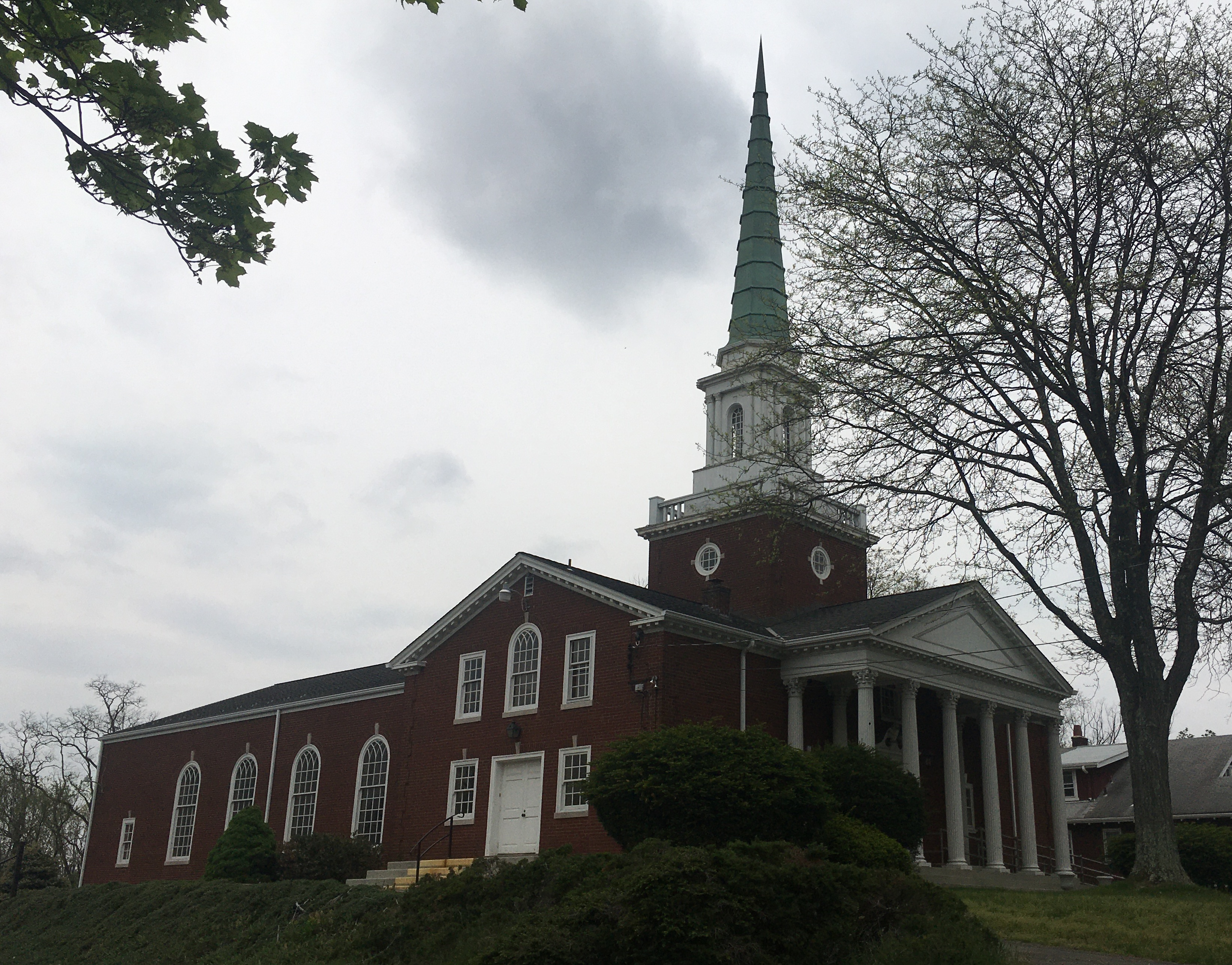
- Interactive map of the First Church of Christ, Scientist area

General information
- Architectural style: Colonial Revival
- Location: Mt. Lebanon, Pennsylvania, United States
- Completed: 1939
- Demolished: 2021
- Client: First Church of Christ, Scientist

Design and construction
- Architect: Charles Draper Faulkner

First Church of Christ, Scientist, built in 1939, was an historic redbrick Colonial Revival style Christian Science church located at 1100 Washington Road in Mt. Lebanon, Pennsylvania. Its entrance portico was supported by 6 Corinthian columns on the front and 4 on the rear. The steeple was centered behind the portico. Its auditorium has 18-foot (5.5 m) high plain glass arched windows on either side. Like most Christian Science churches, the focal point of its auditorium was the readers' platform with its double lectern to accommodate the two Readers who conduct the service. It was designed by noted Chicago-based architect Charles Draper Faulkner, who was renowned for the churches and other buildings that he designed in the United States and Japan. He designed over 33 Christian Science church buildings and wrote a book called Christian Science Church Edifices which features this church as well as many others.

In 2002, Mt. Lebanon magazine featured First Church of Christ, Scientist, along with 3 other local churches in an article on Colonial style churches.

First Church of Christ, Scientist, building at 1100 Washington Road in Mt. Lebanon, was sold in July 2018. It was demolished in December 2021.

== See also ==
- First Church of Christ, Scientist (disambiguation)

Paul Eli Ivey, Prayers in Stone, Christian Science Architecture in the United States, 1894-1930 University of Illinois Press, 1999.

== Resources ==
- Faulkner, Charles Draper, Christian Science Church Edifices second edition, 1946, Chicago: self-published, has a plot plan on p. 68 and pictures of the church's exterior and interior on pp. 162, 164, 166, 168 and 296.
