= First Church of Christ, Scientist (Marshalltown, Iowa) =

- Formerly listed on the U.S. National Register of Historic Places
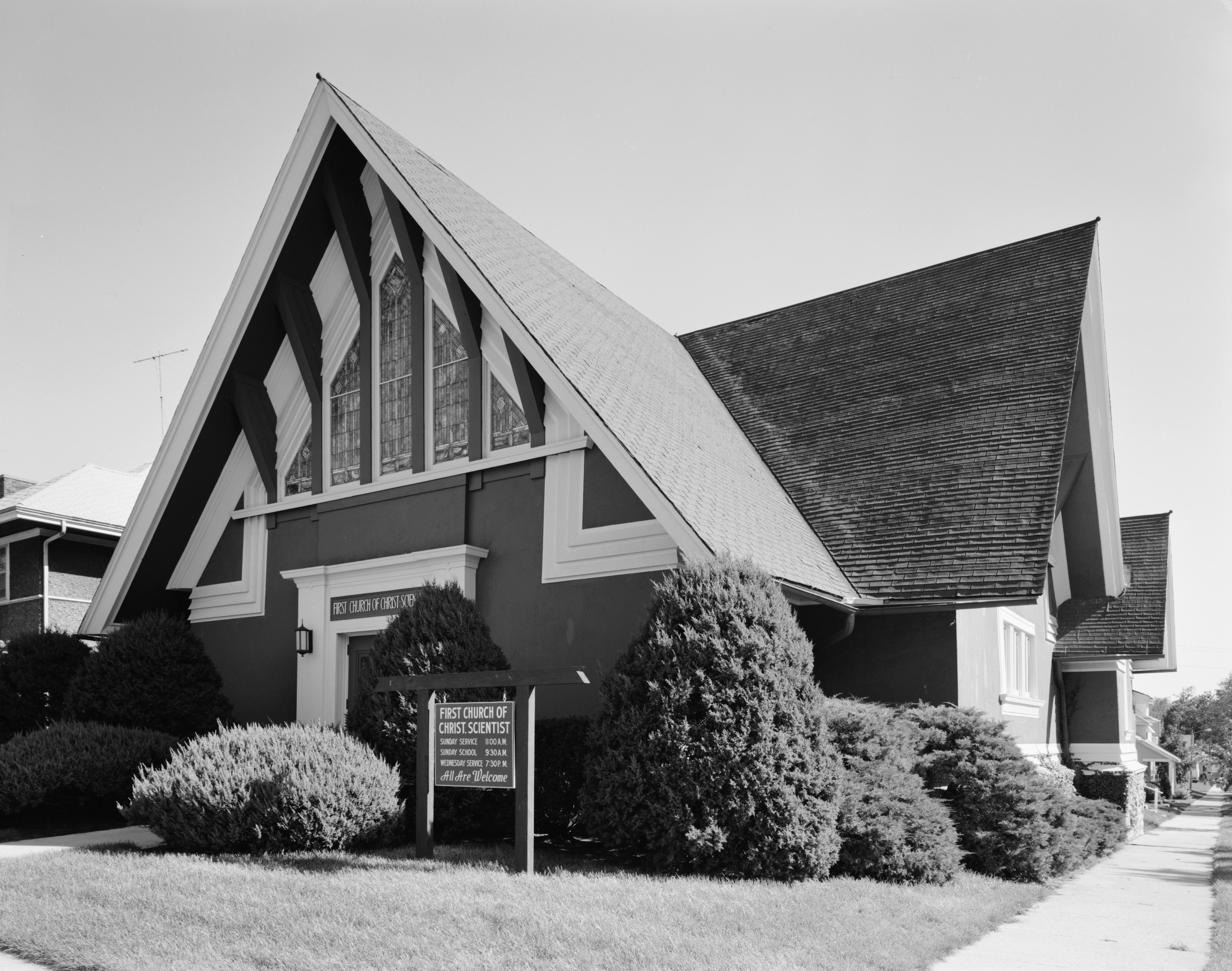
- Seen in September 1977

- Location within Iowa Location within the United States
- Location: 412 W. Main St., Marshalltown, Iowa
- Coordinates: 42°2′57.12″N 92°55′10.2″W
- Area: less than one acre
- Built: 1903
- Architect: Hugh M.G. Garden
- Architectural style: Prairie School
- NRHP reference No.: 79000915

Significant dates
- Added to NRHP: 1979
- Removed from NRHP: May 22, 1998

First Church of Christ, Scientist was a Prairie School church building located at 412 West Main Street, in Marshalltown, Iowa, United States. Designed by architect, Hugh M.G. Garden, it was once on the National Register of Historic Places, but was bulldozed in August, 1985, and was later removed from the National Register.

== National register listing ==
- First Church of Christ, Scientist ** (added 1998 - Building - #79000915)
- 412 W. Main St., Marshalltown
- Historic Significance: Architecture/Engineering
- Architect, builder, or engineer: Garden, Hugh M.G.
- Architectural Style: Prairie School
- Area of Significance: Architecture
- Period of Significance: 1900-1924
- Owner: Private
- Historic Function: Religion
- Historic Sub-function: Religious Structure
- Current Function: Religion
- Current Sub-function: Religious Structure

== Gallery ==
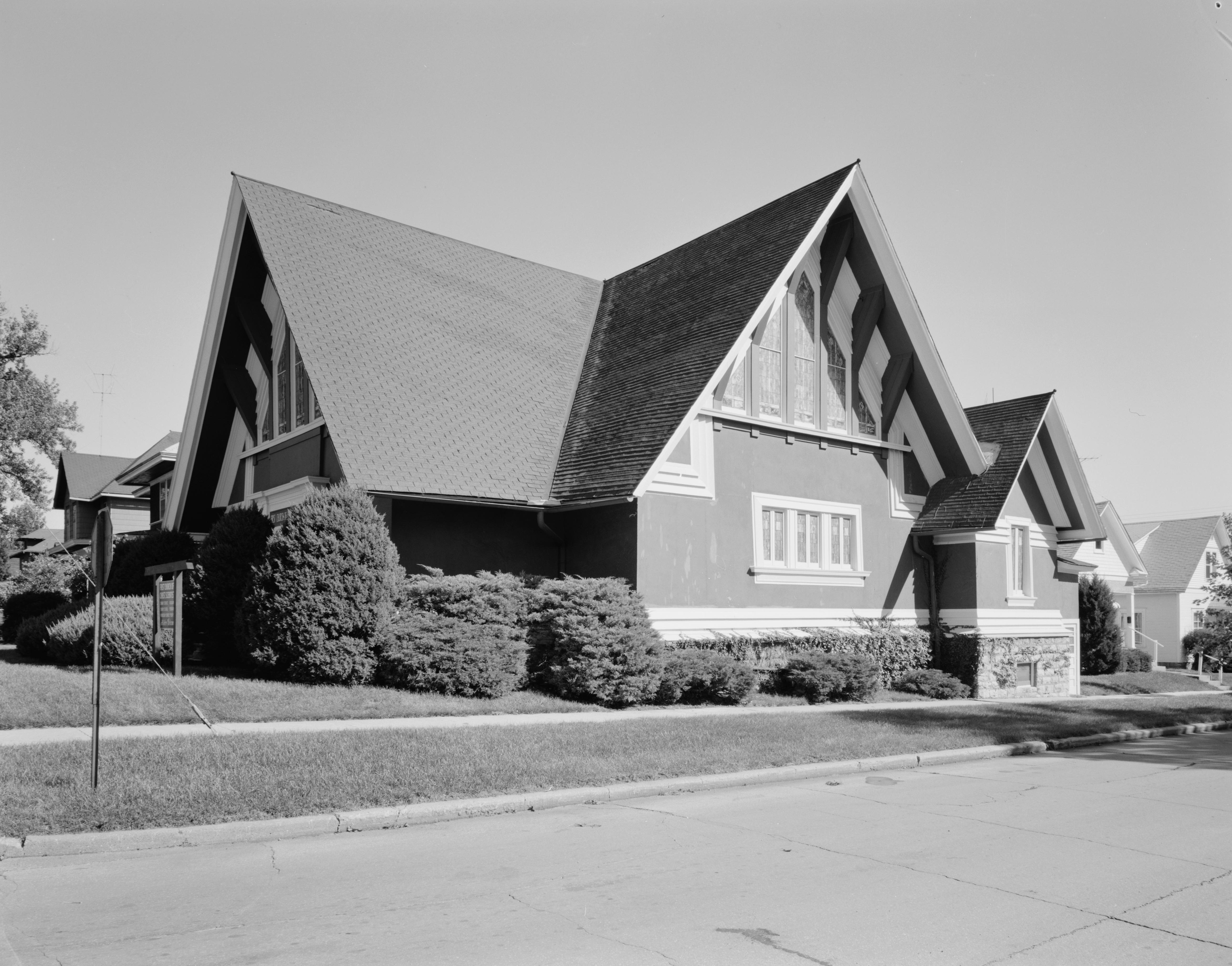

== See also ==
- List of Registered Historic Places in Iowa
- List of former Christian Science churches, societies and buildings
- First Church of Christ, Scientist (disambiguation)
