= First Church of Christ, Scientist (Elyria, Ohio) =

Historic church in Ohio, United States

- U.S. National Register of Historic Places
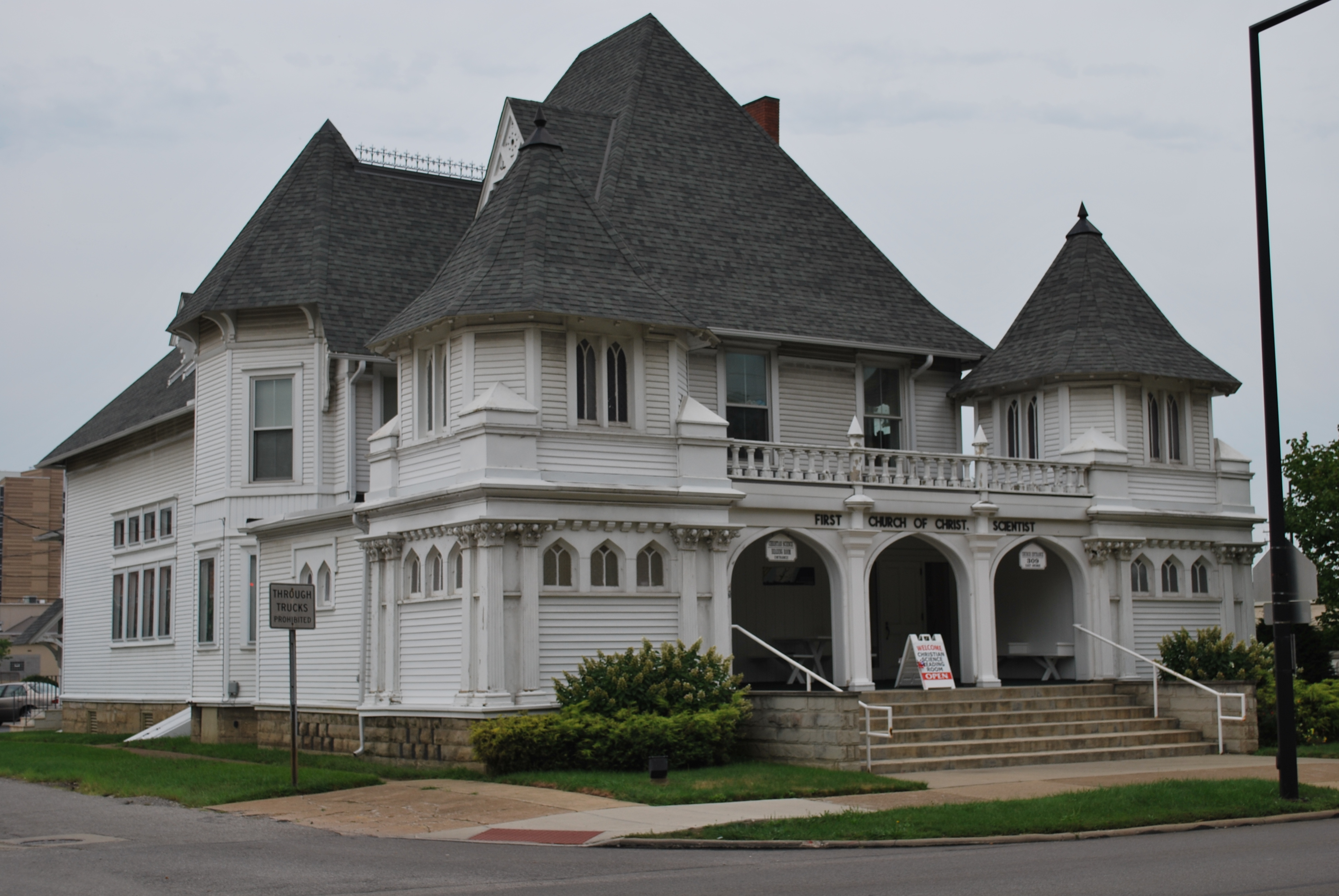

- Location within Ohio Location within the United States
- Location: 309 East Ave., Elyria, Ohio
- Coordinates: 41°21′54″N 82°6′15″W
- Area: less than one acre
- Built: 1906
- Architectural style: Late Victorian
- NRHP reference No.: 75001460
- Added to NRHP: July 18, 1975

First Church of Christ, Scientist, located at 309 East Avenue, in Elyria, Ohio, in the United States is an historic structure that on July 18, 1975, was added to the National Register of Historic Places. As of 2018 it is now known as Christian Science Society of Elyria-Lorain.

== National register listing ==
- First Church Of Christ, Scientist (added 1975 - Building - #75001460)
- 309 East Ave., Elyria
- Historic Significance: Architecture/Engineering
- Architect, builder, or engineer: Unknown
- Architectural Style: Late Victorian
- Area of Significance: Architecture
- Period of Significance: 1900-1924
- Owner: Private
- Historic Function: Religion
- Historic Sub-function: Religious Structure
- Current Function: Religion
- Current Sub-function: Religious Structure

== History ==
First Church of Christ, Scientist was built in 1906 by splitting an existing house in half, separating the halves and building a new section in between them. The new section consisted of an auditorium with a steep four sided roof-ceiling over it and an entrance porch facing the street.

== Current use ==
First Church of Christ, Scientist is still an active Christian Science church, now known as Christian Science Society, Elyria-Lorain. ,

== See also ==
- List of Registered Historic Places in Ohio
- First Church of Christ, Scientist (disambiguation)
