= First Church of Christ, Scientist (Fairfield, Iowa) =

Church in Fairfield, Iowa, US

Coordinates: 41.007°N 91.960°W

The former First Church of Christ, Scientist is located at 300 East Burlington Avenue in Fairfield, Iowa, United States. It is an historic structure that on October 30, 1997 was determined to be eligible for addition to the National Register of Historic Places, but was not added. The building now houses St. Gabriel and All Angels Liberal Catholic Church.

== National Register nomination ==
- First Church of Christ Scientist (added 1999 - Building - #99000127)
- Also known as St. Gabriel and All Angels Liberal Catholic Church
- 300 E. Burlington Ave., Fairfield
- Historic Significance: Event
- Area of Significance: Architecture
- Period of Significance: 1925-1949
- Owner: Private
- Historic Function: Religion
- Historic Sub-function: Religious Structure
- Current Function: Religion
- Current Sub-function: Religious Structure

== See also ==
- List of Registered Historic Places in Iowa
- List of former Christian Science churches, societies and buildings
- First Church of Christ, Scientist (disambiguation)
