= Fifth Church of Christ, Scientist =

Fifth Church of Christ, Scientist may refer to any fifth Christian Science branch church in a given city, including but not limited to:

- Fifth Church of Christ, Scientist (Denver), a Denver Landmark
- Fifth Church of Christ, Scientist (Los Angeles), now a Mosaic Church
- Fifth Church of Christ, Scientist (New York City)
- Fifth Church of Christ, Scientist (Seattle)

== See also ==
- First Church of Christ, Scientist (disambiguation)
