= First Church of Christ, Scientist (Neillsville, Wisconsin) =

Historic church in Wisconsin, United States

- U.S. National Register of Historic Places
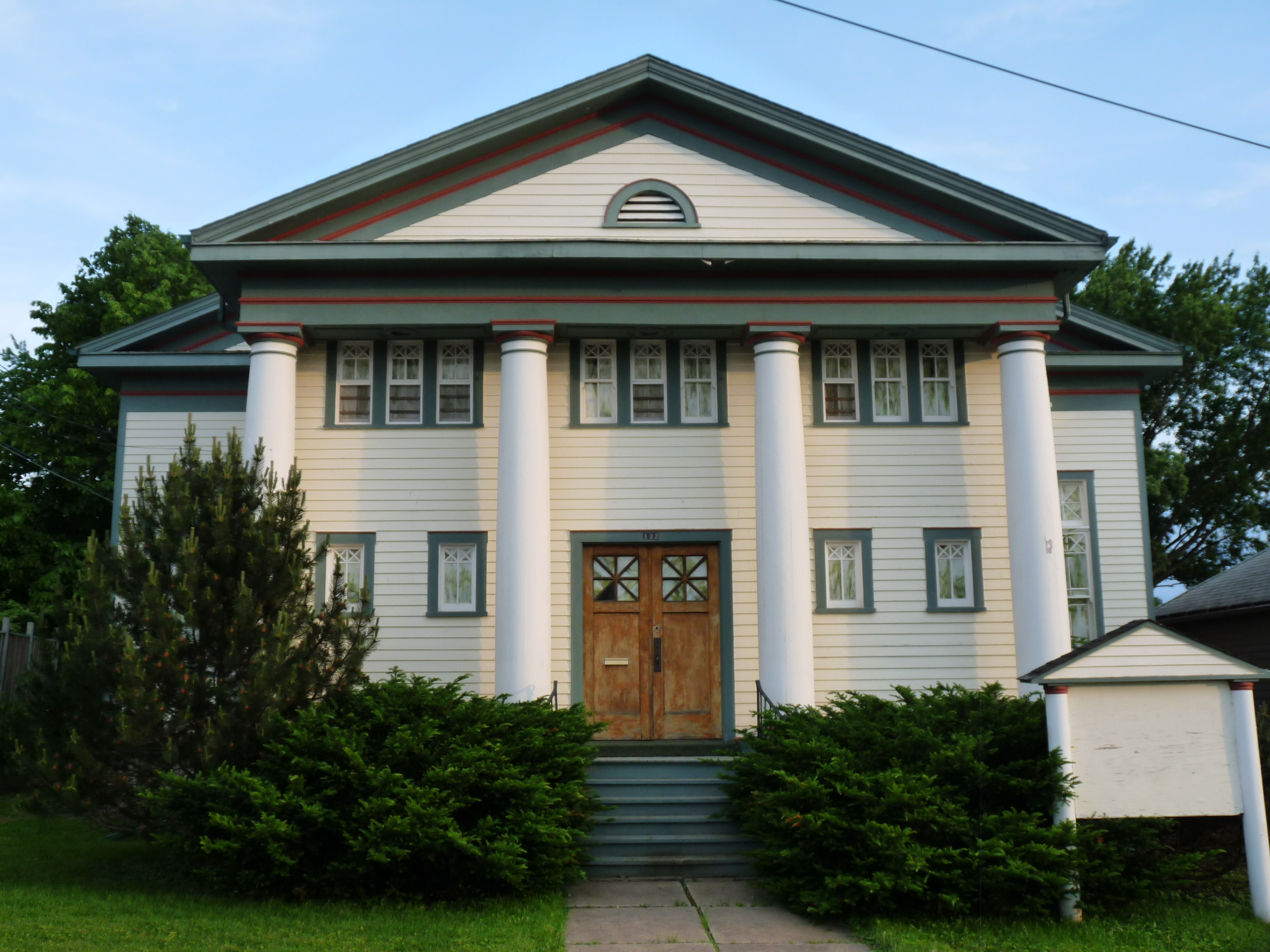

- Location within Wisconsin Location within the United States
- Location: 132 E 4th St. Neillsville, Wisconsin
- Coordinates: 44°33′31″N 90°35′44″W
- Built: 1916
- Architect: Corbey, L.J.; Free. William
- Architectural style: Classical Revival
- NRHP reference No.: 03000168
- Added to NRHP: March 31, 2003

The former First Church of Christ, Scientist, built in 1916 in the Classical Revival style, is a historic Christian Science church edifice located at 132 E. 4th Street in Neillsville, Wisconsin. It was designed in the form of a Greek cross by Chicago architect L. J. Corbey for Christian Science Society, Neillsville, which had been organized in January, 1912 and which later became First Church of Christ, Scientist. Its front portico is supported by four large Tuscan columns. While small in size, the building projects a large presence. Its auditorium windows are of green opalescent art glass. On March 31, 2003, it was added to the National Register of Historic Places.

First Church of Christ. Scientist, Neillsville, is no longer listed in the Christian Science Journal.

== See also ==
- First Church of Christ, Scientist (disambiguation)
- List of former Christian Science churches, societies and buildings
