= First Church of Christ, Scientist (Milwaukee) =

Historic church in Wisconsin, United States

- U.S. National Register of Historic Places
- U.S. Historic district
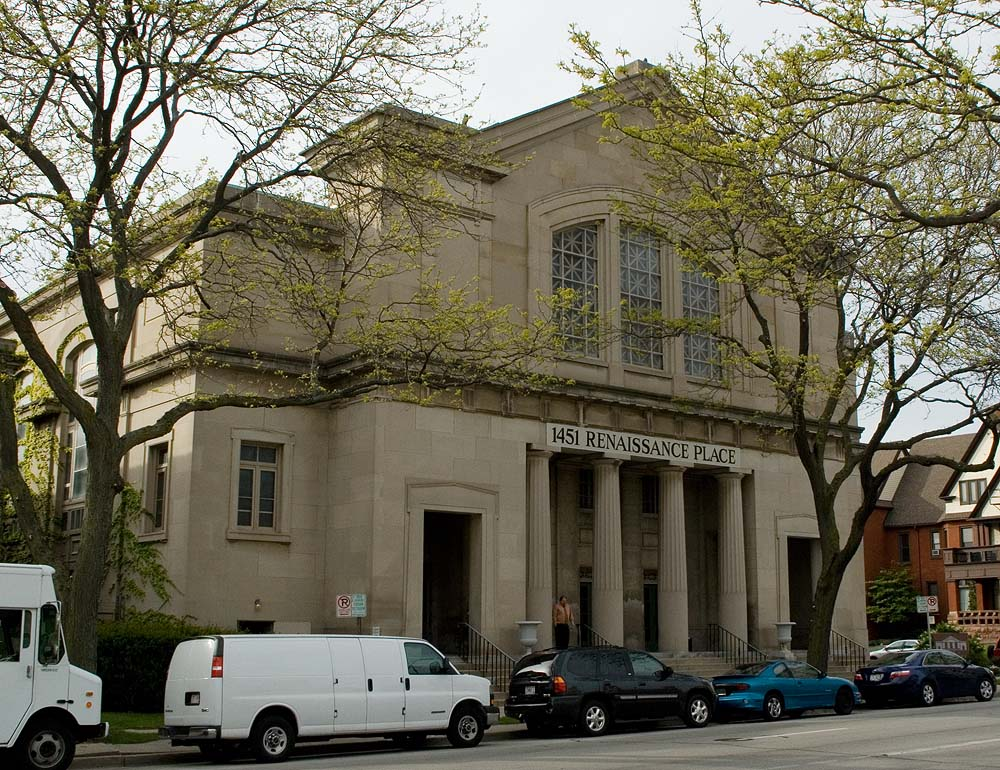
- May 2010

- Location within Wisconsin Location within the United States
- Location: 1443--1451 N. Prospect Ave., Milwaukee, Wisconsin
- Coordinates: 43°2′57″N 87°53′41″W
- Area: 3 acres (1.2 ha)
- Built: 1907
- Architect: Solon Spencer Beman
- Architectural style: Classical Revival
- NRHP reference No.: 89000070
- Added to NRHP: March 08, 1989

The former First Church of Christ, Scientist, built in 1907, is an historic Christian Science church edifice located at 1443–1451 North Prospect Avenue in Milwaukee, Wisconsin. It was designed in the Classical Revival style by noted Chicago architect Solon Spencer Beman, who designed at least a dozen other Christian Science churches across the country. On March 8, 1989, it was added to the National Register of Historic Places. Today it is occupied by 1451 Renaissance Place and is the venue for weddings and other social events as well as corporate events.

== See also ==
- First Church of Christ, Scientist (disambiguation)
- List of former Christian Science churches, societies and buildings
