= First Church of Christ, Scientist (Sandusky, Ohio) =

Historic church in Ohio, United States

- U.S. National Register of Historic Places
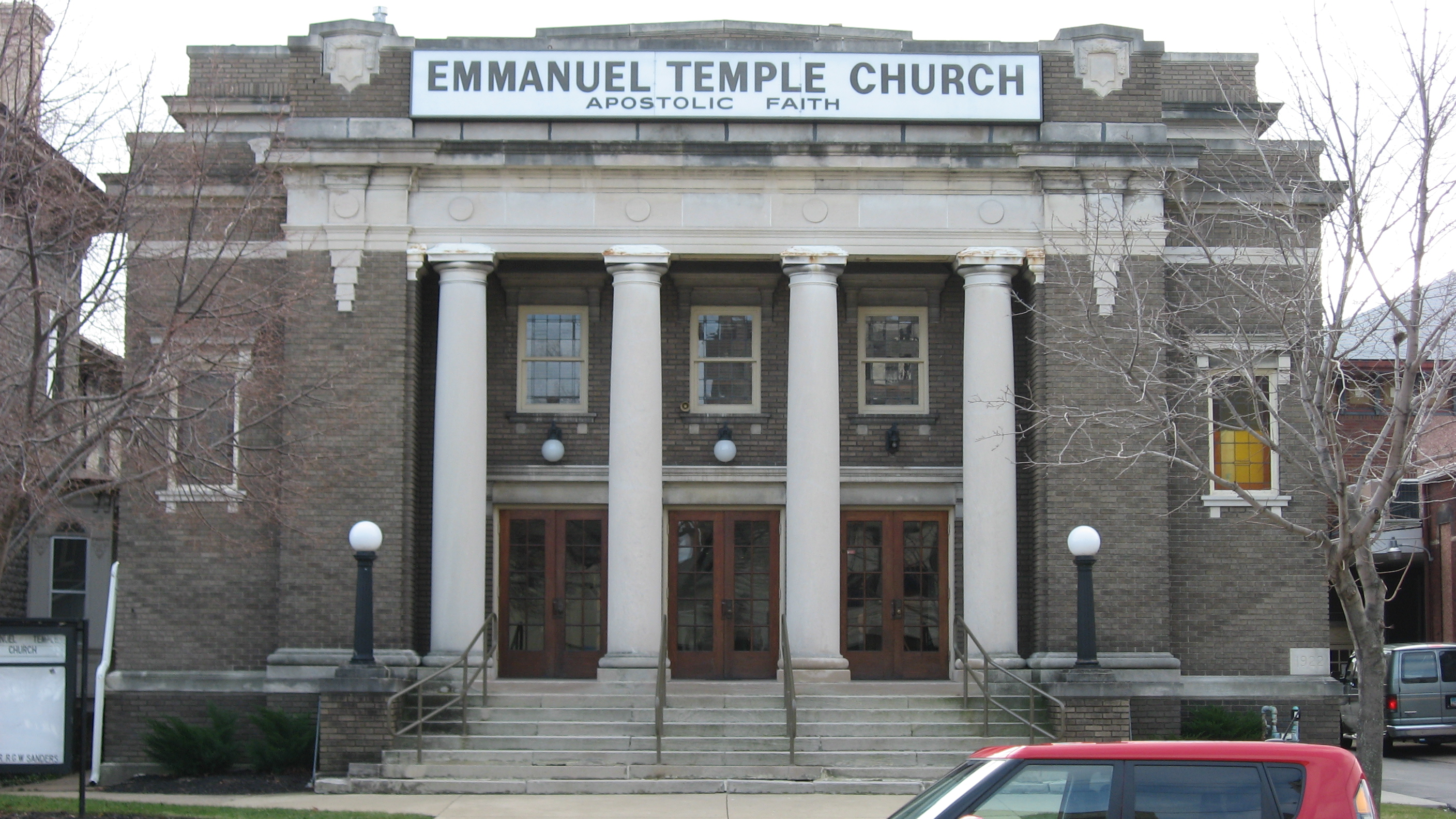
- Front of the church building

- Location within Ohio Location within the United States
- Location: 128 E. Adams St., Sandusky, Ohio
- Coordinates: 41°27′14″N 82°42′32.5″W
- Area: Less than 1 acre (0.40 ha)
- Built: 1922
- Architectural style: Neoclassical
- MPS: Sandusky MRA
- NRHP reference No.: 82001398
- Added to NRHP: October 20, 1982

The former First Church of Christ, Scientist, located at 128 East Adams Street, in Sandusky, Ohio, in the United States is an historic structure that on October 20, 1982, was added to the National Register of Historic Places. The building is now Emmanuel Temple Church.

== Current use ==
First Church of Christ, Scientist, Sandusky, is no longer in existence. Emmanuel Temple Church, affiliated with the Pentecostal Assemblies of the World (PAW), now worships in the building. The Rev. Rufus G. W. Sanders, Ph.D., bishop of the PAW, is the founding pastor, of Emmanuel Temple Church.

== See also ==
- List of Registered Historic Places in Erie County, Ohio
- List of former Christian Science churches, societies and buildings
- First Church of Christ, Scientist (disambiguation)
