= First Church of Christ, Scientist (West Palm Beach, Florida) =

Historic church in Florida, United States

Coordinates: 26.7045096°N 80.0872645°W

- First Church of Christ, Scientist; West Palm Beach, Florida
- U.S. National Register of Historic Places
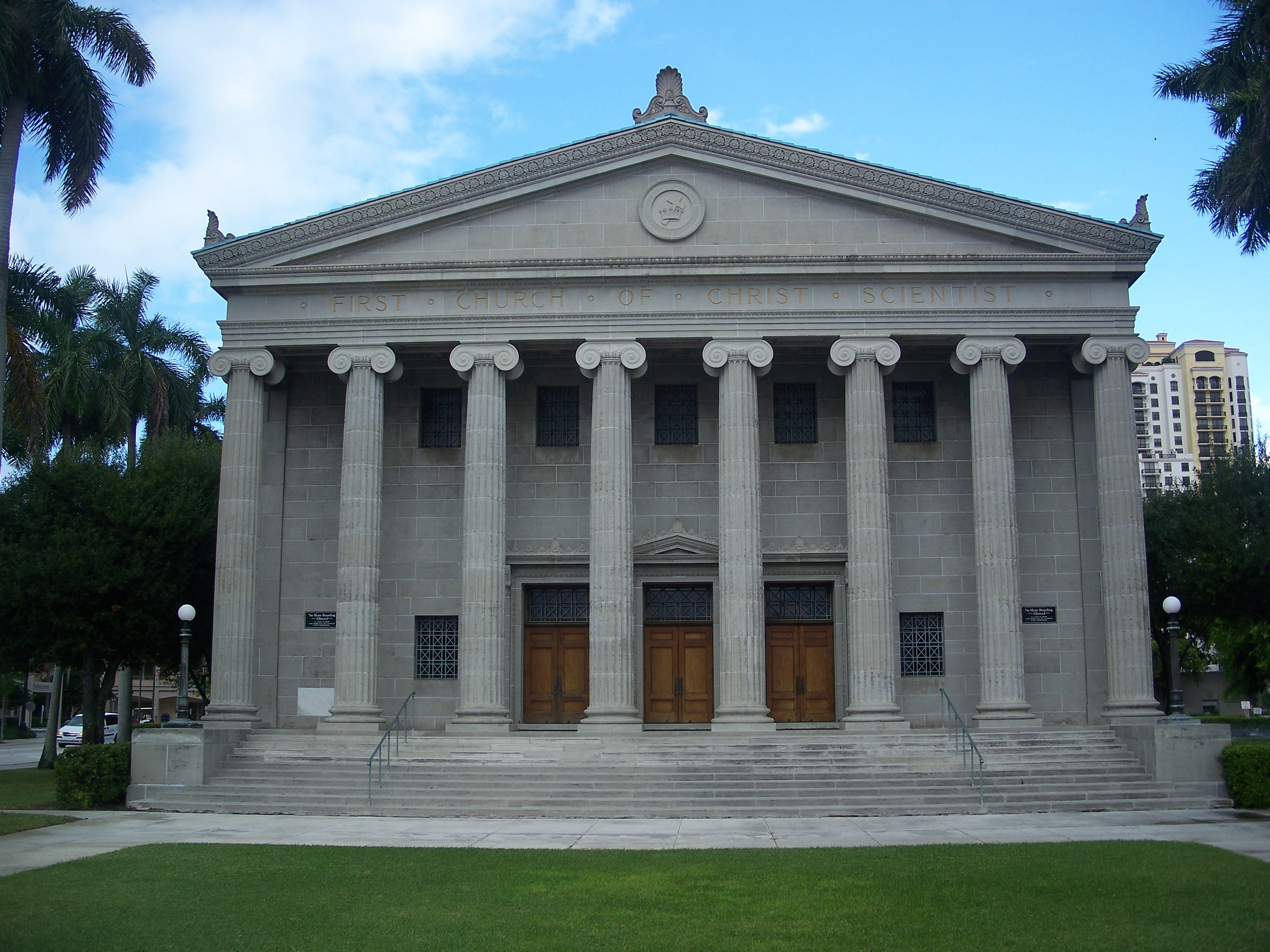
- Location: 809 South Flagler Drive; West Palm Beach, Florida
- Built: 1928
- Architect: Horace Trumbauer; F.W. Blandford
- Architectural style: Classical Revival
- NRHP reference No.: 98001519

First Church of Christ, Scientist, located at 809 South Flagler Drive in West Palm Beach, Florida, is an historic structure that on December 3, 1998, was determined to be eligible for listing on the National Register of Historic Places. However, the owner objected to the property being listed on the Register. It is still a functioning Christian Science church.

== National register listing ==
- First Church of Christ Scientist ** (added 1998 - Building - #98001519)
- Also known as PB681
- 809 S. Flagler Dr., West Palm Beach
- Historic Significance: Architecture/Engineering
- Architect, builder, or engineer: Blandford, F.W., Trumbauer, Horace
- Architectural Style: Classical Revival
- Area of Significance: Architecture
- Period of Significance: 1925-1949
- Owner: Private
- Historic Function: Religion
- Historic Sub-function: Religious Structure
- Current Function: Religion
- Current Sub-function: Religious Structure

== See also ==
- List of Registered Historic Places in Palm Beach County, Florida
- First Church of Christ, Scientist (disambiguation)
- Julian Abele, Architectural Engineer
