= First Church of Christ, Scientist (Toronto) =

Coordinates: 43.670029°N 79.40116°W

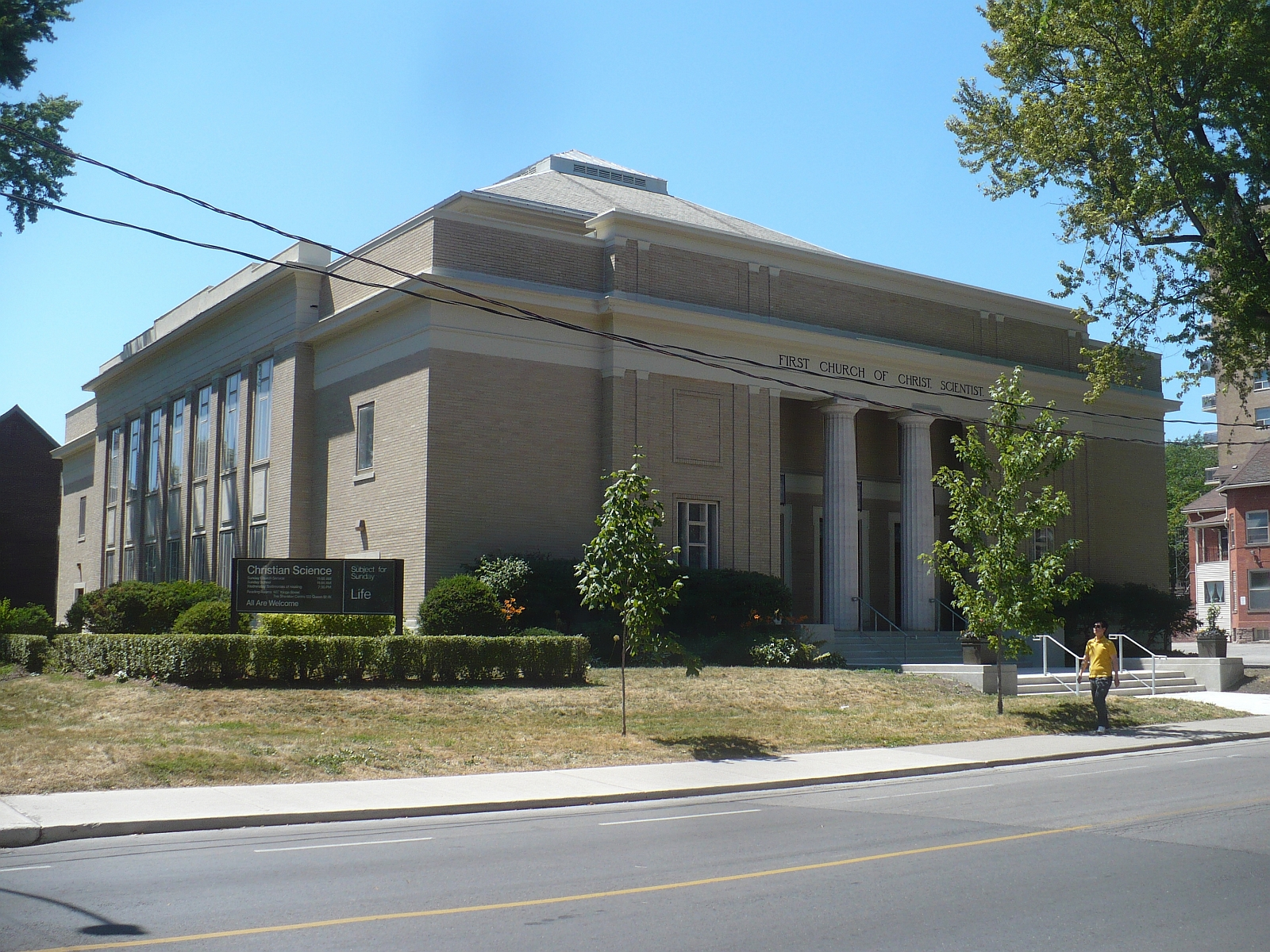
First Church of Christ, Scientist in Toronto

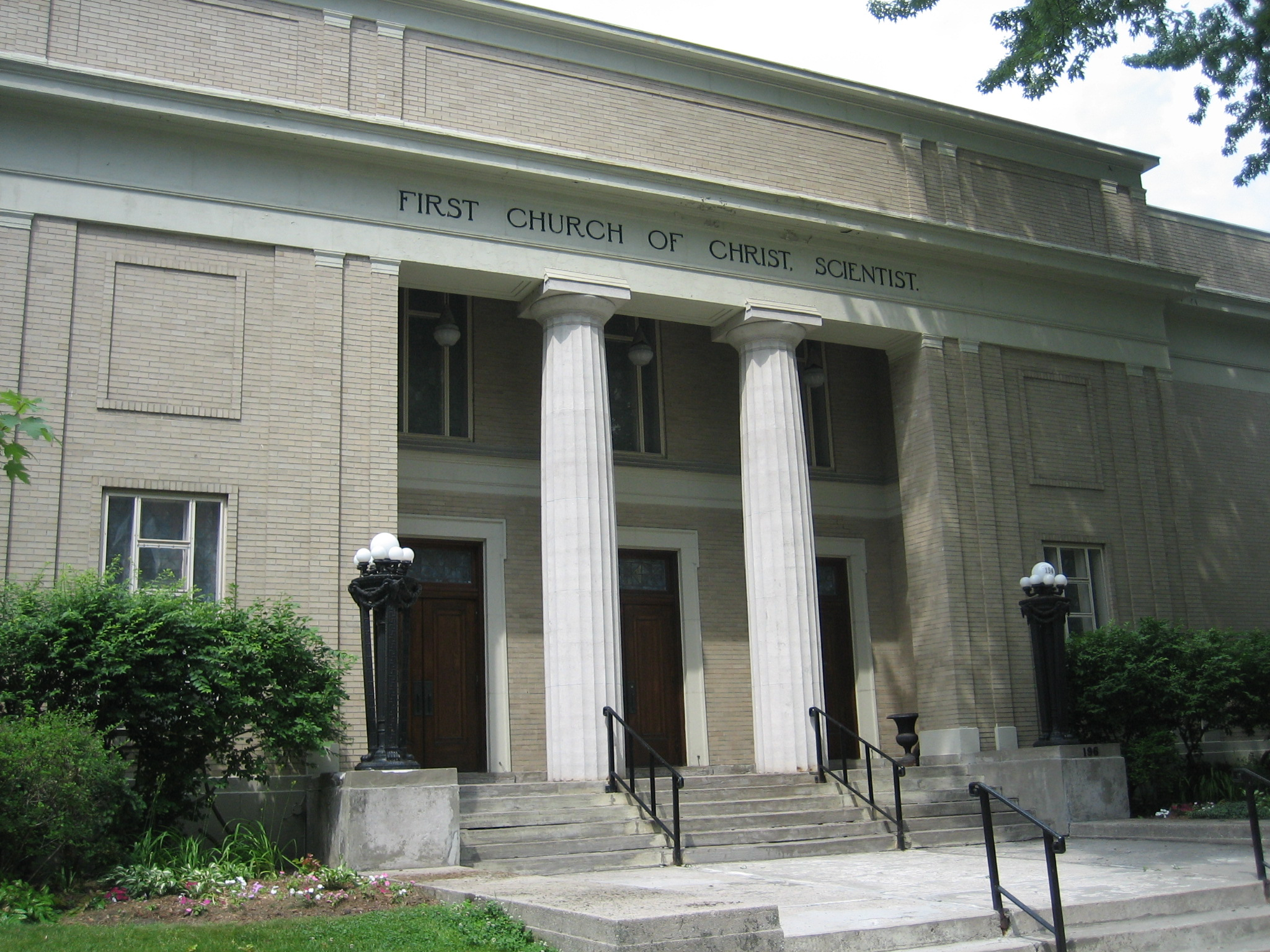
Entrance to the church on St. George St.

The First Church of Christ, Scientist is the oldest Christian Science congregation in Toronto, Ontario, Canada. It is located at 196 St. George Street in The Annex neighbourhood, just north of the University of Toronto. It maintains a Reading Room at 927 Yonge Street north of Bloor Street. The church is a branch of The First Church of Christ, Scientist in Boston, Massachusetts, USA.

The congregation was founded in Toronto in September 1889, soon after the first Christian Science services in Canada were held informally in a private home in the city. The group referred to itself as Church of Christ, Scientist until December 1893, when it became First Church of Christ, Scientist, to distinguish itself from another congregation which had also begun to meet in Toronto.

After meeting in a series of private homes from December 1888 though October 1889, the congregation rented a series of halls including Orange Hall near Euclid Avenue and College Street for their services. After September 1890, the group's size required a move to larger quarters at College Street and Brunswick Avenue. It was at that location that the group was first formally identified as a church. In 1896 the congregation purchased an existing church building (previously the Reformed Episcopal Church) that it had been leasing on University Avenue and remodeled it. The resulting church building was reopened and dedicated on June 19, 1898. This continued to be the church's home until 1916.

Construction of the present church building was begun in June, 1914 and dedicatory ceremonies were held on July 9, 1916. The architect for this building was Solon S. Beman of Chicago, the architect of several buildings at the 1893 Chicago World's Fair and more than a dozen other Christian Science churches following a similar architectural style.
