= First Church of Christ, Scientist (New Bern, North Carolina) =

Historic church in North Carolina, United States

- U.S. National Register of Historic Places
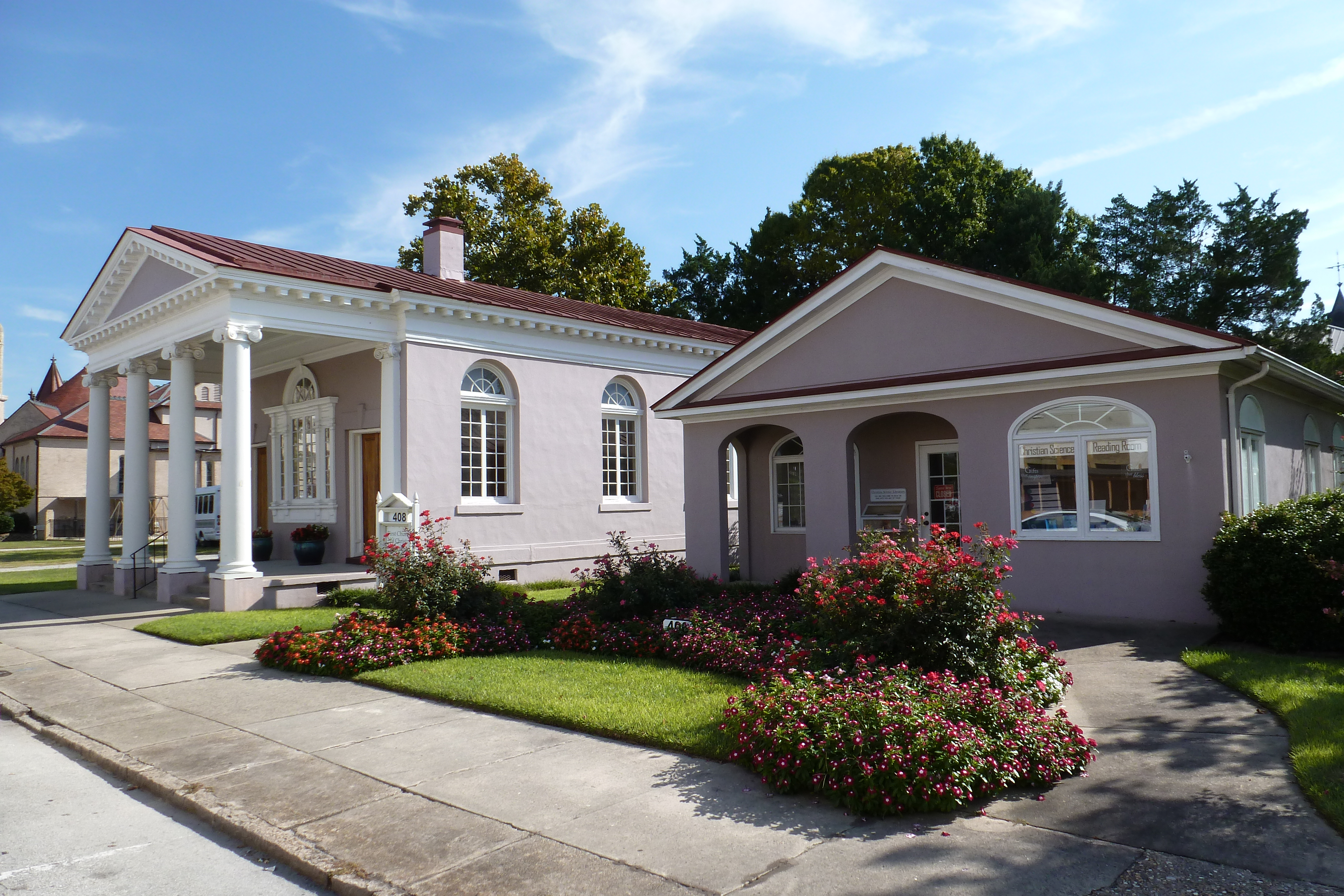

- Location within North Carolina Location within the United States
- Location: 406 and 408 Middle St., New Bern, North Carolina
- Coordinates: 35°6′29″N 77°2′22″W
- Area: 0.3 acres (0.12 ha)
- Built: 1907
- Architect: Simpson, Herbert Woodley
- Architectural style: Classical Revival
- NRHP reference No.: 73001321
- Added to NRHP: October 2, 1973

First Church of Christ, Scientist, New Bern, built in 1907, is an historic Christian Science church building located at 406-408 Middle Street, in New Bern, Craven County, North Carolina, in the United States. It was designed in the Classical Revival style by prolific local architect Herbert Woodley Simpson. Its exterior is constructed of stuccoed brick.

== History ==
Christian Science came to North Carolina in 1894 after Mary Hatch Harrison of New Bern recovered from a form of paralysis under Christian Science treatment while in Boston. When she returned to New Bern, the first Christian Science services in North Carolina were held in her house, which also later housed the first Christian Science Reading Room in the state. The church officially organized on August 18, 1902, with eighteen members.

Construction of the church building began in May of 1907, and was finished on July 28th, with the church being dedicated debt-free.

On October 2, 1973, the church building was added to the National Register of Historic Places.

First Church of Christ, Scientist, New Bern, is still an active Christian Science congregation.

== See also ==
- List of Registered Historic Places in North Carolina
