= St. Stephen's Church (Chicago) =

Coordinates: 41.791986°N 87.590657°W

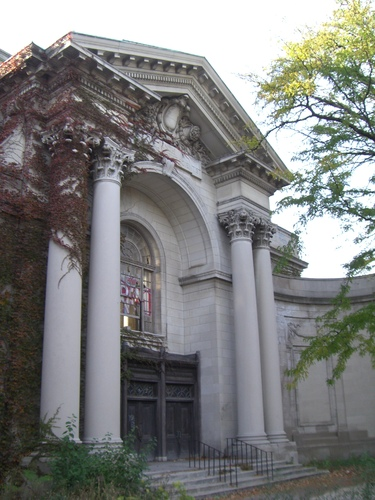
St. Stephen's Church, Hyde Park, Chicago

St. Stephen's Church, originally named Tenth Church of Christ, Scientist, Chicago, is an abandoned church located in the Hyde Park neighborhood of Chicago, Illinois.

== History ==
The church was constructed in 1917 as the 10th Church of Christ, Scientist, and modelled after The First Church of Christ, Scientist in Boston, Massachusetts. The Christian Scientists held services in the building until sometime in the 1960s, when a smaller Black congregation purchased the structure and renamed it St. Stephen's. This church, in turn, moved out in the 1990s and sold the building to Konstantinos Antoniou, who planned on turning the property into a condo complex. However, protracted battles with the neighborhood resulted in Antoniou's plans stalling. The property eventually was foreclosed and is currently held by Heartland Bank and Trust Company.
