= First Church of Christ, Scientist, Perth =

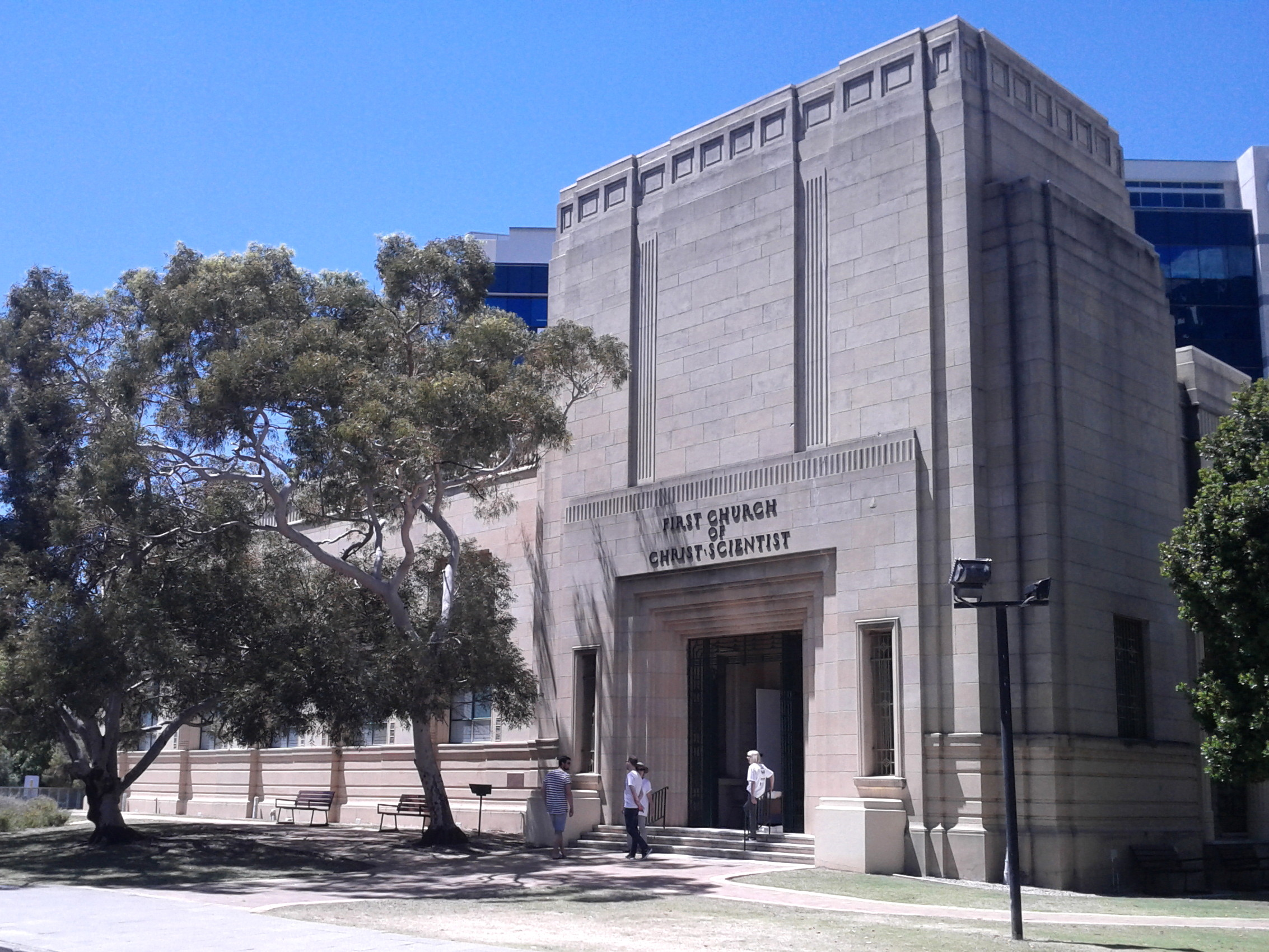
- First Church of Christ, Scientist, Perth
- 31.9519°S 115.8492°E
- Location: Perth, Western Australia
- Country: Australia
- Denomination: Christian Science
- Website: www.christianscienceperth.com.au

History
- Dedicated: 26 June 1949

Architecture
- Architect(s): Ochiltree & Hargrave
- Architectural type: Art Deco
- Years built: 1939

Specifications
- Capacity: 650

Western Australia Heritage Register
- Type: State Registered Place
- Designated: 28 June 2005
- Reference no.: 11595

First Church of Christ, Scientist, Perth is a Christian Science church located at 264 St Georges Terrace, on the corner of Elder Street, in Perth, Western Australia.

== History ==
Christian Science in Perth began in 1904 when several adherents arrived from Sydney and began meeting each week to read Bible lessons. The first public Christian Science service was held in 1908. By 1912 the group had formed the Christian Science Society, which subsequently became the First Church of Christ, Scientist, Perth in 1920. Services were held in a variety of rooms rented in Perth.

In 1926 the Church bought the site on the corner of St Georges Terrace and Elder Street (then George Street), which included several outbuildings of what had originally been the Pensioner Barracks. In 1933 an auditorium was built as a temporary church before the church was built in 1939.

The original harmonium was replaced in 1953 by a pipe organ, which was upgraded in 1983.

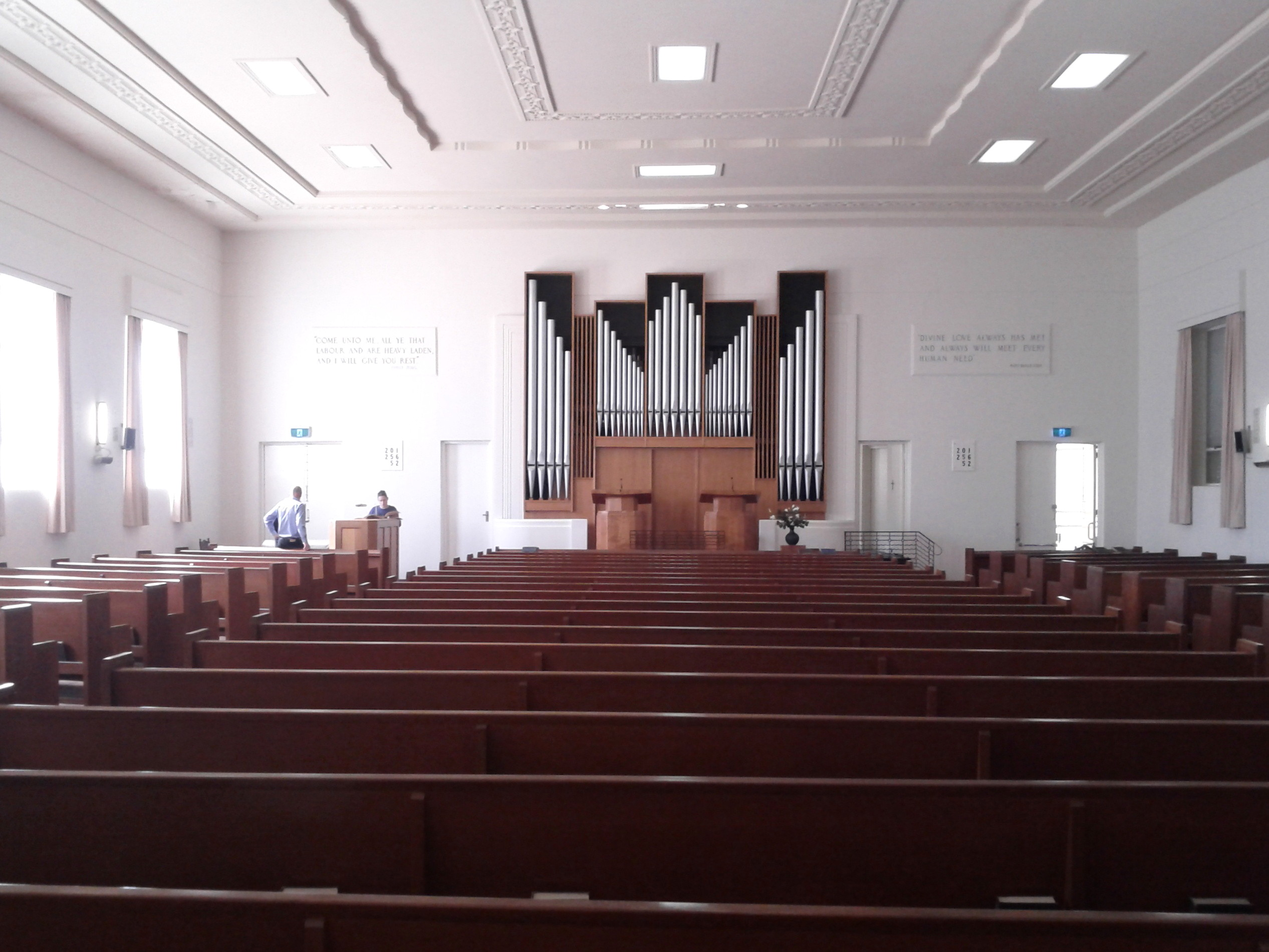
Interior of the church

In 2001 the church was included in the Municipal Heritage Inventory for the City of Perth. In 2002 it was classified by the National Trust of Australia (WA), and in 2005 it was added to the State Register of Heritage Places.
