= Fourth Church of Christ, Scientist =

Fourth Church of Christ, Scientist may refer to any fourth Christian Science branch church in a given city, including but not limited to:

- Fourth Church of Christ, Scientist (Denver), now the Zen Center of Denver
- Fourth Church of Christ, Scientist (Milwaukee), now the Chinese Christian Church of Milwaukee
- Fourth Church of Christ, Scientist (New Orleans), formerly the Lakeview Presbyterian Church
- Fourth Church of Christ, Scientist (New York City), now the Hebrew Tabernacle of Washington Heights
- Fourth Church of Christ, Scientist (San Francisco), now the Internet Archive
- Fourth Church of Christ, Scientist (Seattle), now Town Hall Seattle

== See also ==
- First Church of Christ, Scientist (disambiguation)
