= First Church of Christ, Scientist (North Vancouver) =

Church building in British Columbia, Canada

Coordinates: 49.3155°N 123.0711°W

- Interactive map of the First Church of Christ, Scientist area

General information
- Architectural style: Classical Revival
- Location: North Vancouver (city), British Columbia, Canada
- Construction started: 1925
- Completed: 1925

Technical details
- Structural system: 1-storey, with basement, frame

Design and construction
- Architects: Honeyman and Curtis

The former First Church of Christ, Scientist is an historic Christian Science church edifice located at 189 Keith Road on the eastern end of Victoria Park in North Vancouver, British Columbia, Canada.

It was designed in the Classical Revival style by the noted British Columbia architectural firm of Honeyman and Curtis. Built in 1925, it is a single-storey wooden building with basement. The city of North Vancouver has declared that the building is "valued for its architecture and classically-inspired details" and "distinguished by a formal central entrance and consistent, refined detailing". Saying that its: "Columns, symmetry and fenestration all contribute to its strong sense of proportion and formality", the city on January 1, 1995, designated it a primary local heritage site.

On January 4, 2008, First Church of Christ, Scientist sold its building to North Shore Bethel Christian Mennonite Brethren Church.
