= List of tallest buildings in South Bend =

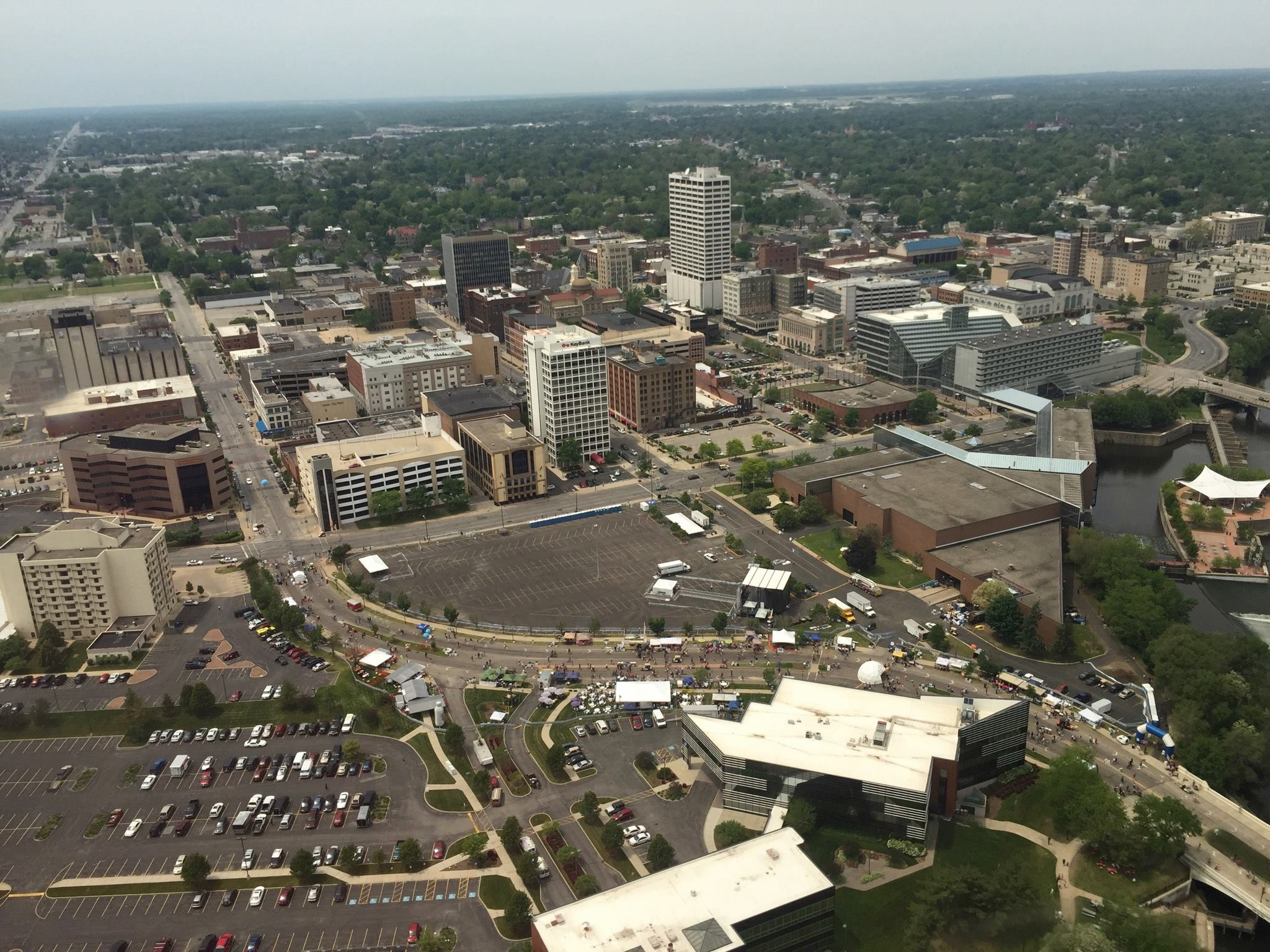
An aerial photo of Downtown South Bend

This is a list of the tallest buildings in South Bend, Indiana by roof height. The tallest has been the 25-story Liberty Tower, since its completion in 1971. Eighteen total structures are approximately one hundred feet tall. The Four Winds Casino Hotel was completed in early 2023, and is the only building above 150 feet located outside of South Bend's central business district.

== List ==
Rank	Name	Image	Height ft (m)	Floors	Year	Notes
1	Liberty Tower		331 (101)	25	1970	13th tallest building in Indiana; Recently known as the Chase Tower; Facade underwent renovation from 2015 to 2020; Tallest building in Indiana outside of Indianapolis and Fort Wayne
2	Four Winds Casino South Bend		291 (89)	23	2023	317-room hotel; Owned and operated by the Pokagon Band of Potawatomi
3	County-City Building	County City Building in downtown South Bend, Indiana. The building is 14 stories tall and houses the Office of the Mayor, as well as many other municipal and county offices.	196 (60)	15	1971	City hall for South Bend and the headquarters of St. Joseph County
4	Memorial Hospital of South Bend		216 (66)	12	1958	526-bed hospital
5	Key Bank Center		154 (47)	14	1968	Formerly known as the St. Joseph Bank Building
6	Hoffman Hotel	Nyttend - Own work	153 (47)	12	1930	Added to the National Register of Historic Places (NRHP) in 1985; Also known as the Amerigo Building; Currently an apartment building
7	Tower Building	Isslwc - Own work	150 (46)	12	1929	Added to NRHP in 1985; Also known as the Fifth Third Bank Building
8	300 East LaSalle		150 (46)	10	2021	Apartment tower with retail and restaurant space
9	Karl King Tower		124 (38)	12	1978	High-rise apartment tower
10	Jefferson Centre		112 (34)	8	1924	Low-rise commercial office building; Renovated in 1970 and 2018
11	Studebaker Assembly Plant Building 84		110 (34)	6	1923	Low-rise industrial complex; Was a Studebaker assembly plant until ~1966
12	LaSalle Hotel		108 (33)	9	1922	Former hotel and current apartment building; NRHP listing
13	I&M Building		104 (32)	7	1920	Red Cross office; NRHP listing
14	Trinity Tower		102 (31)	9	1973	Assisted living community for seniors
15	J.M.S. Building		97 (30)	8	1910	Built by John Studebaker; Commercial and apartment space; Added to NRHP in 1985

== See also ==
- List of tallest buildings in Indiana
