= UCDC =

UCDC can refer to:

- Dimitrie Cantemir Christian University, Bucharest, Romania
- Ulster Constitution Defence Committee, Northern Ireland, founded by Ian Paisley
- University Child Development Center, University of Pittsburgh, United States
- University of California, Washington DC (UCDC), a program of the University of California, Irvine
