= Solon Spencer Beman =

American architect

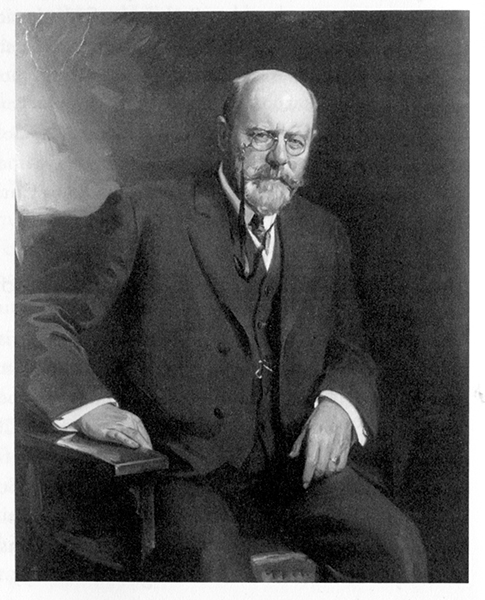
- Born: October 1, 1853; Brooklyn, New York, U.S.
- Died: April 23, 1914 (aged 60); Chicago, Illinois, U.S.
- Occupation: Architect

Solon Spencer Beman (October 1, 1853 – April 23, 1914) was an American architect based in Chicago, Illinois and best known as the architect of the planned Pullman community and adjacent Pullman Company factory complex, as well as Chicago's renowned Fine Arts Building. Several of his other largest commissions, including the Pullman Office Building, Pabst Building, and Grand Central Station in Chicago, have since been demolished. Beman designed numerous Christian Science churches and influenced the design of countless more.

== Career ==
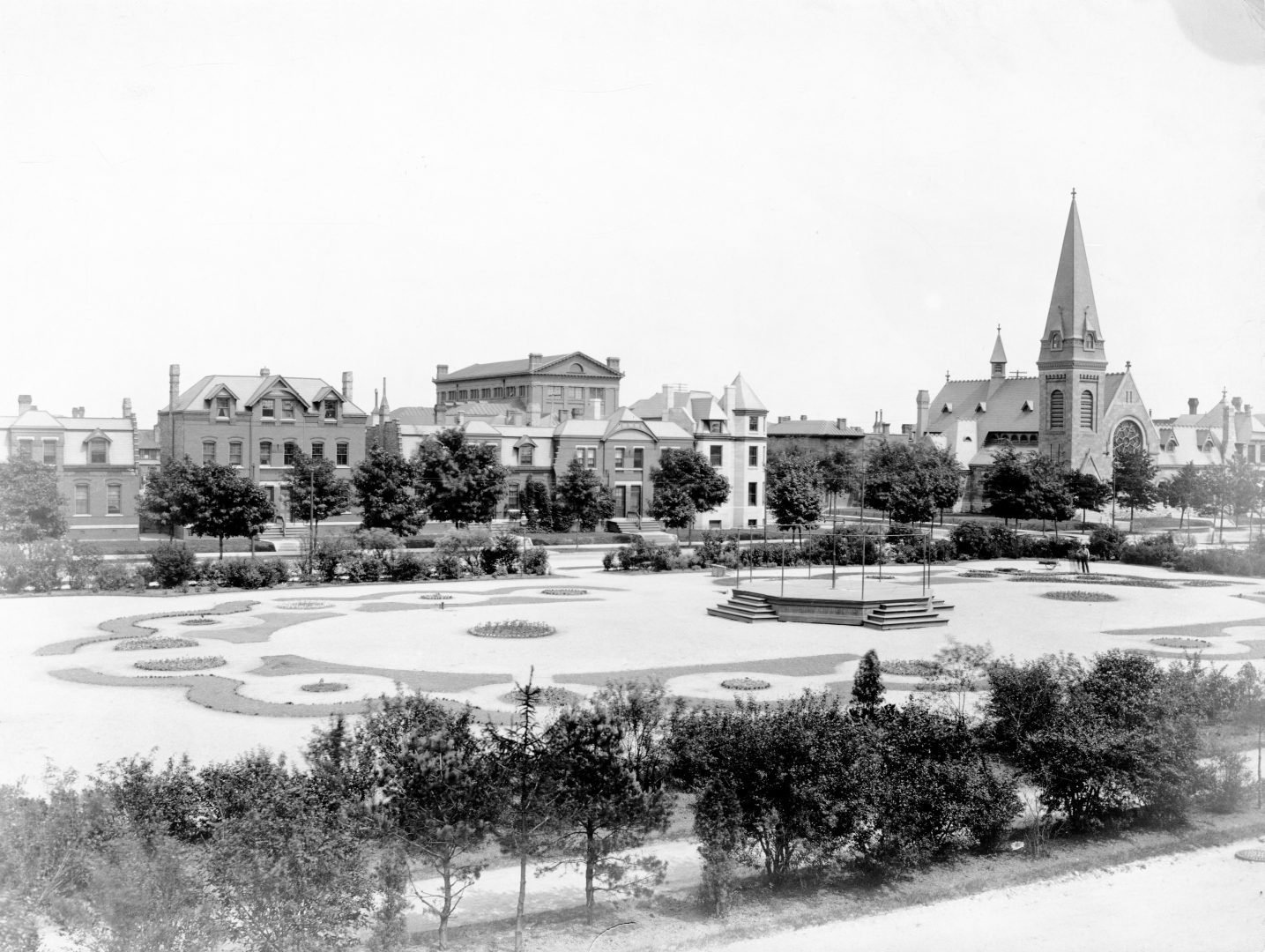
Arcade Park in Pullman surrounded by picturesque buildings in historical styles, including the Gothic Revival Greenstone Church.

Beman was born in the borough of Brooklyn in New York City, New York, to a father who was fascinated with architecture and who maintained an extensive collection of books on the subject. Encouraged by his father, in 1870 Beman began his architectural training at 17 in the office of New York architect Richard Upjohn, best known for his religious designs in the Gothic Revival style. While with Upjohn, Beman helped design the Connecticut State Capitol, and eventually became sufficiently accomplished to be named an associate designer. In 1877, Beman left Upjohn to begin his own practice.

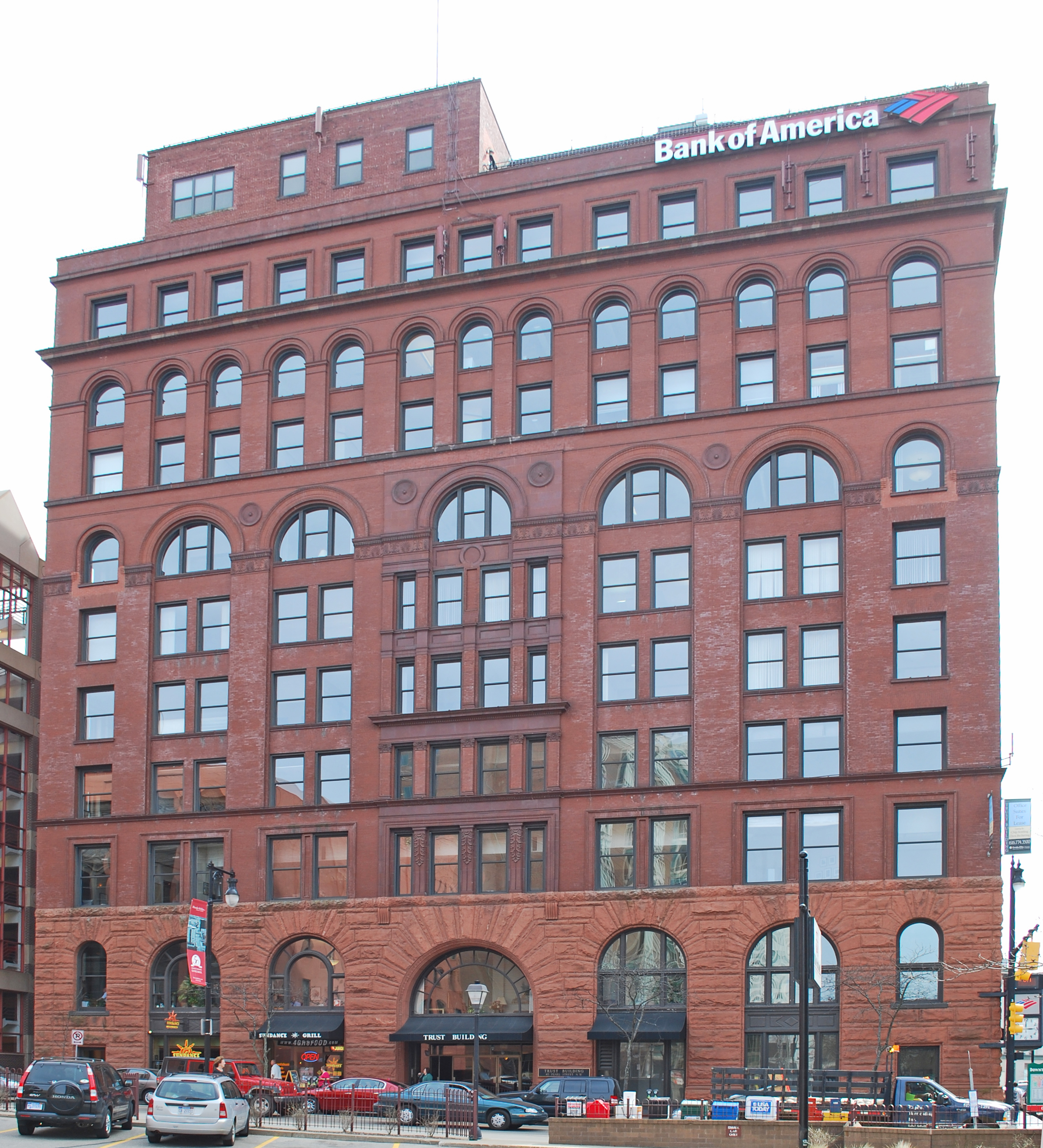
The Michigan Trust Company Building in Grand Rapids, Michigan, designed by Beman in the Romanesque Revival style. When completed in 1891, it was the tallest office building in Grand Rapids and the second-tallest in Michigan.

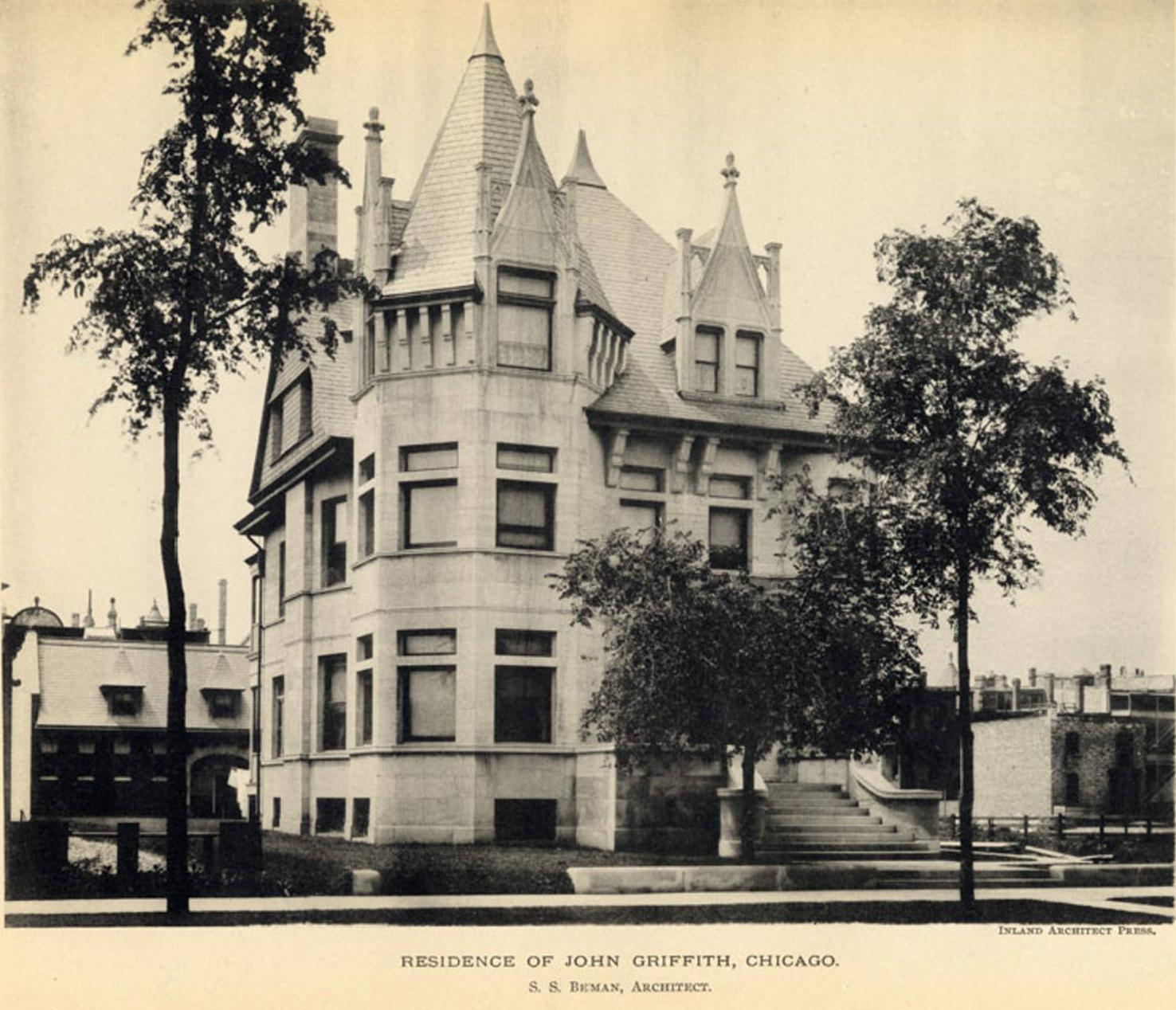
The home of Chicago contractor John W. Griffiths as it appeared in The Inland Architect and News Record in February 1893. The house was purchased in 1959 by Margaret Taylor-Burroughs and became the first home of what is now the DuSable Museum of African American History in 1961. The house is a designated Chicago landmark and is listed in the National Register of Historic Places.

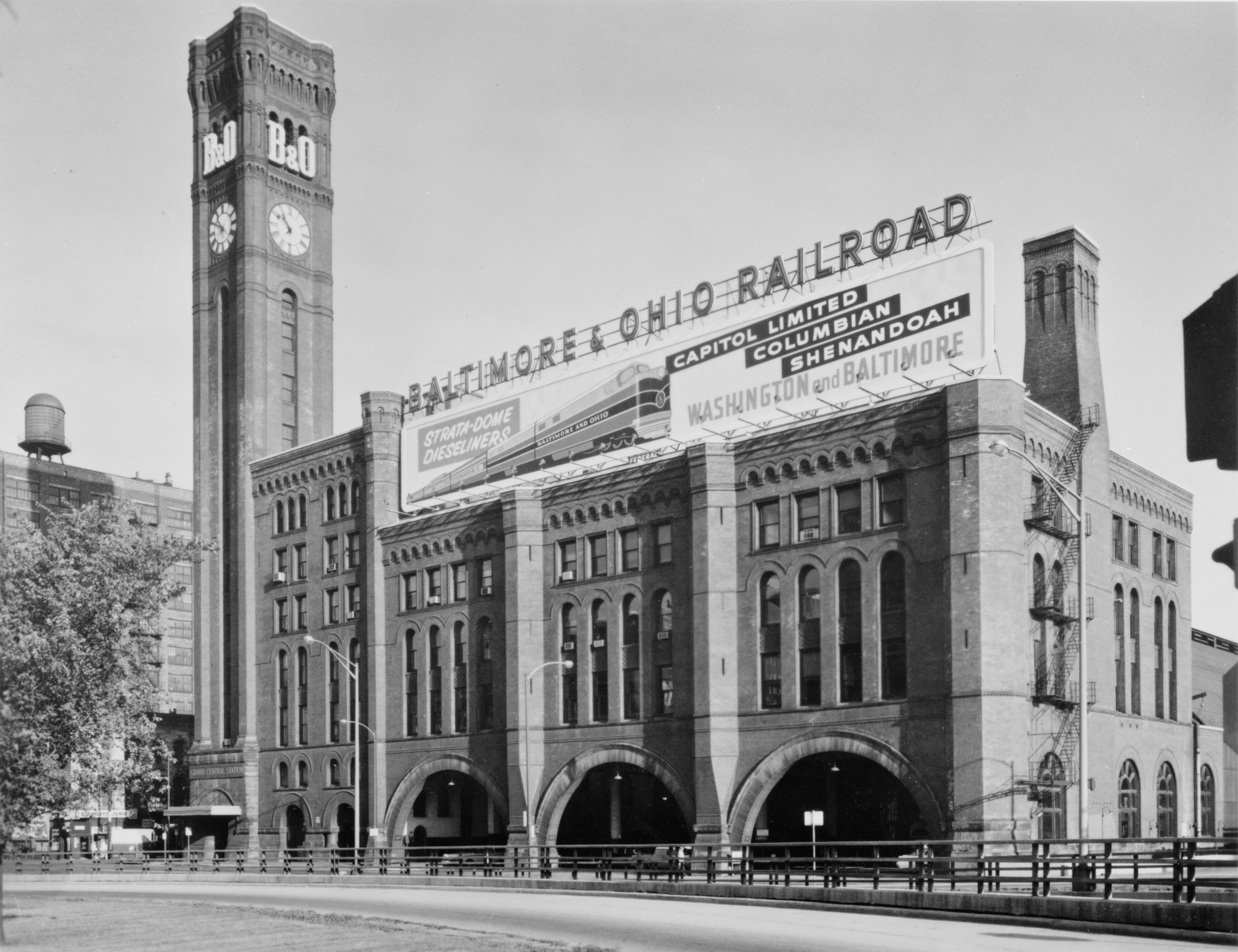
Grand Central Station (Chicago), designed by Beman in the Romanesque Revival style.

In 1879, Beman received a commission from George Pullman to design what would become the nation's first planned company town, and he relocated to Chicago to carry out the extensive work involved. Pullman arranged for Beman to design the many buildings involved, while landscape architect Nathan Franklin Barrett created the street and park system. Located south of Chicago on the shore of Lake Calumet (in what would become Chicago's Far South Side), the company town of Pullman included more than 1,300 houses, a factory, monumental water tower, theater, church, hotel, market, and schools but the town of Pullman soon became controversial. Celebrated for orderliness and planning at first, Pullman's reputation soured when the Pullman Palace Car Company refused to lower town prices or rents for workers after cutting their wages, touching off the bitter national Pullman Strike. Ultimately the courts forced Pullman to relinquish the town, it was annexed by Chicago, and is now an Illinois state historic site.

Beman's early buildings tended toward picturesque eclecticism with varied historical details. Fashionable at the time, these styles included Gothic Revival, Queen Anne, Romanesque Revival, and Châteauesque (sometimes called Francis I style after the French king from 1515-1547). In Pullman, Beman designed block after block of rowhouses that "feature a variety of elevations and detailing that create an overall picturesque appearance." Also included among the buildings for the Pullman development were Hotel Florence (Queen Anne style), Greenstone Church (Gothic Revival), and the Pullman Administration Building (Romanesque Revival).

Continuing his historicism, Beman's subsequent work for wealthy Chicagoans included a magnificent Queen Anne-style residence for Marshall Field Jr. (son of the department store magnate) at 1919 South Prairie (1884) and two Châteauesque mansions: W.W. Kimball Mansion (1890-1892) at 1801 Prairie Avenue and John W. Griffiths Mansion (1892, later Griffiths-Burroughs House) at 3806 South Michigan Avenue. With asymmetrical plans and elevations, high-pitched, visually complex rooflines, and "fancifully treated chimneys", Châteauesque enjoyed a period of popularity for "the elaborate homes of America’s newly-established wealthy families" beginning with the Vanderbilts. Beman was quite skilled at Châteauesque, which when successful involves "the adroit mixing of Renasissance and Late Gothic details... [and is] rather tricky for any but the cordon bleus of the profession."

In Chicago, Beman also designed the Studebaker Fine Arts Building (1884) at Michigan Avenue and Van Buren Avenues in the Chicago Landmark Historic Michigan Boulevard District, the Pullman Building on Michigan Avenue, and parts of George Pullman's Prairie Avenue home, which was also later demolished. In 1897, Beman also designed Pullman's monument at Chicago's Graceland Cemetery, a towering Corinthian column flanked by curved benches. Elsewhere, Beman designed the distinctive Pullman summer home at the Thousand Islands, "Castle Rest."

Beman designed several buildings for the World's Columbian Exposition of 1893. Caught up in the trend toward Neoclassicism favored by Daniel H. Burnham, director of the Exposition, after this Beman "abandoned his former playful eclecticism and took on the sobriety and unity of the Renaissance and classical styles."

Beman's other projects in Chicago included the Grand Central Station and its train shed at Harrison and Wells (1891, demolished 1971), the Blackstone Public Library (1905) in the Kenwood neighborhood, and the Hamilton Club Building at Madison and Dearborn Avenue (1913, Demolished).

The Blackstone Public Library Branch, built in 1905, was Chicago's first branch library. The design was a near duplication of the James Blackstone Memorial Library in Branford, Connecticut (1896). Both libraries were built with bequests from the Blackstone family of Chicago.

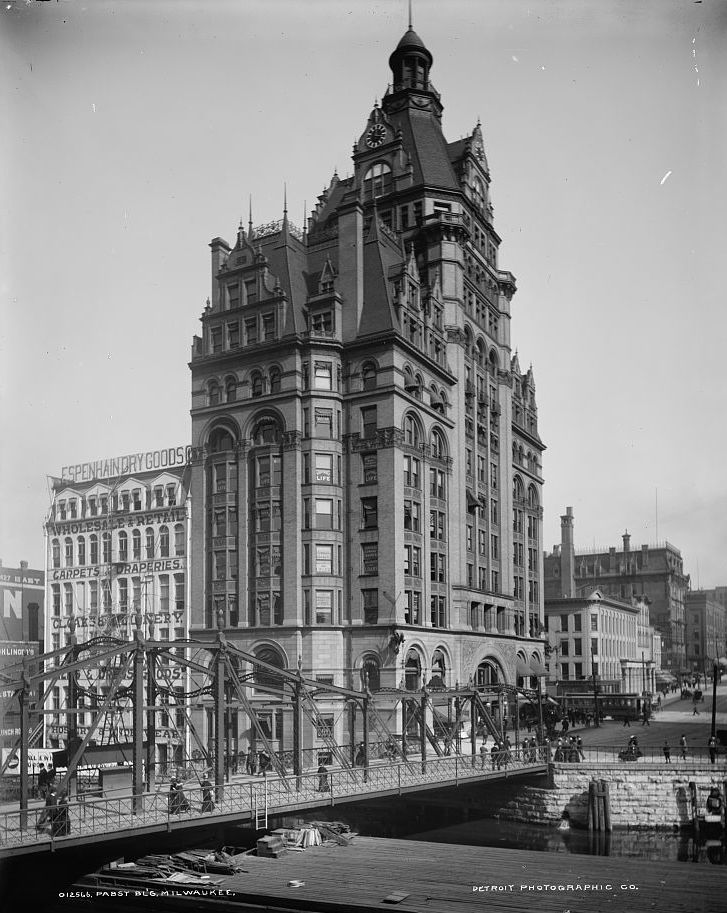
Pabst Building (1891)

He also designed the Pioneer Building in Saint Paul, Minnesota (1889), the Procter & Gamble factories in Cincinnati, Ohio, the Studebaker Administration Building in South Bend, Indiana, the 14-story Pabst Building in Milwaukee, Wisconsin (1891, demolished), the Loyalty Building in Milwaukee, Wisconsin, the Pullman Memorial Universalist Church in Albion, New York (1894), the Michigan Trust Company Building in Grand Rapids, Michigan (1891), the Batavian Bank Building La Crosse, WI (1883), and the J.M.S. Building, also in South Bend (1916).

== Christian Science ==
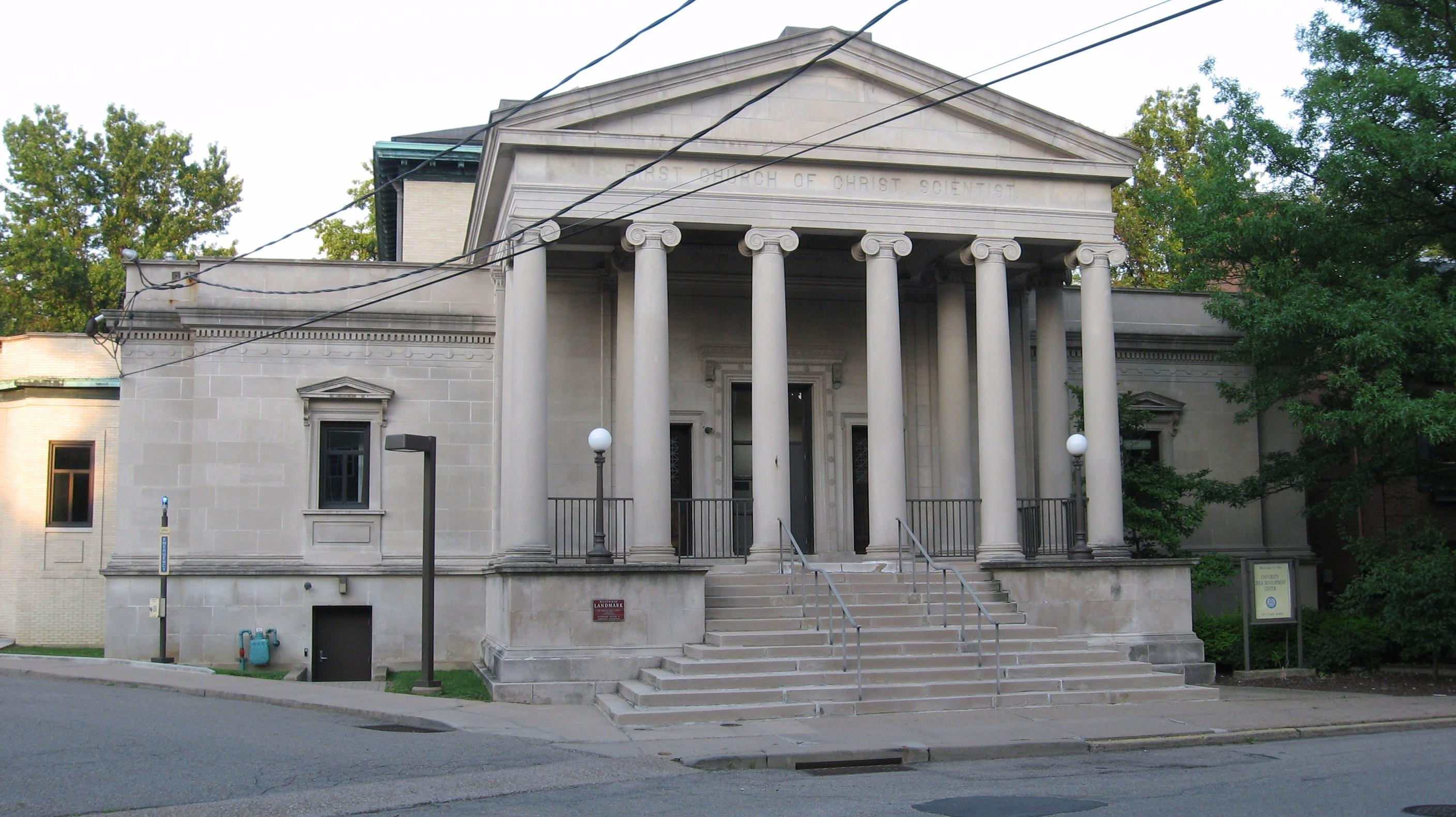
The former First Church of Christ, Scientist (Pittsburgh), constructed in 1904, shows the classical style favored by Beman for Christian Science. It now serves as the University of Pittsburgh's Child Development Center.

Solon S. Beman had a long involvement with Christian Science. He was grateful to the church, which he credited with healing his wife's disability, and in 1897 he designed the First Church of Christ, Scientist (Chicago), at 4017 South Drexel Boulevard. Based on his Merchant Tailors building for the World's Columbian Exposition, the Neoclassical style of the church would have a profound influence on the architecture selected by many Christian Science congregations during their period of greatest construction, which had begun in 1894 with the Mother Church in Boston and would continue until 1930.

Beman oversaw the construction of the Mother Church Extension (Boston, 1904-1906) after the original architect, Charles Brigham, became too ill to proceed and went to Bermuda to recover. With the church's agreement, Beman revamped the design, minimizing what he saw as mystical influences from Ottoman and Byzantine architecture, recasting it into the Classical architectural style that he saw as best suited to Christian Science beliefs.

Beman converted to Christian Science, and designed at least a dozen other Christian Science churches across the country, and an addition to Mary Baker Eddy's Last Home.

In 1904, he designed Fifth Church of Christ, Scientist, at 4840 South Dorchester Avenue in Chicago.

== Legacy ==
A number of architects trained with Beman, including William L. Steele (1875-1949), Charles Draper Faulkner (1890-1979), and Beman's son, Spencer Solon Beman (1887-1952).

Spencer S. Beman practiced architecture with his father, and after his death carried on his Christian Science church design work. Between them, the two Bemans designed a minimum of 90 Christian Science churches. The Solon S. and Spencer S. Beman Collection of archival materials, held by the Ryerson & Burnham Libraries at the Art Institute of Chicago, includes publications documenting their architectural projects.

== See also ==
- Pullman, Chicago
- World's Columbian Exposition
- The First Church of Christ, Scientist
- William J. Dodd, architect and designer who worked for the Beman brothers in the early 1880s.
