= Michigan Trust Company Building =

- U.S. National Register of Historic Places
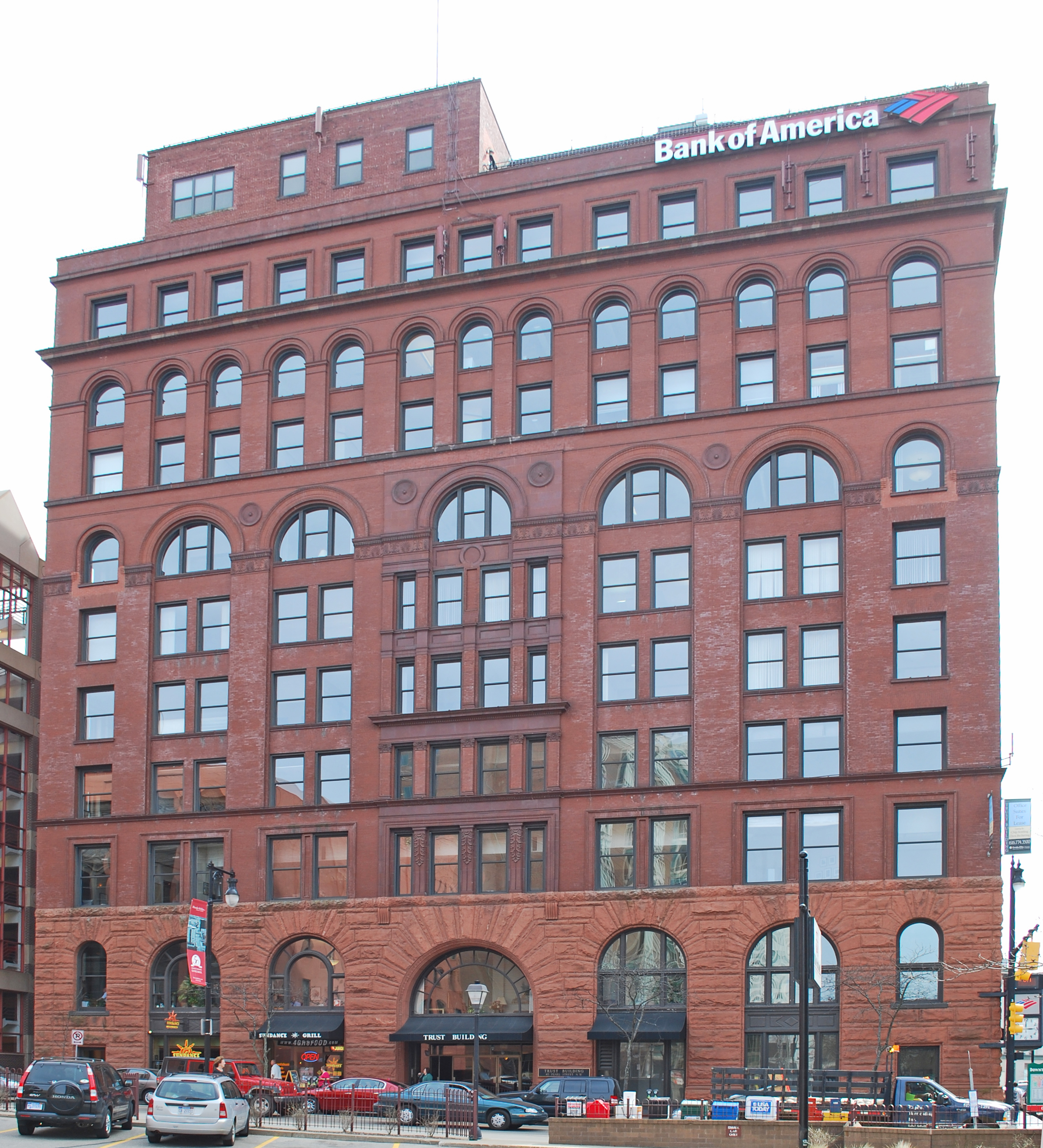

- Location within Michigan Location within the United States
- Interactive map
- Location: 40 Pearl St., NW, Grand Rapids, Michigan
- Coordinates: 42°57′58″N 85°40′12″W
- Area: 0.4 acres (0.16 ha)
- Built: 1891
- Architect: Solon S. Beman
- Architectural style: Romanesque Revival
- NRHP reference No.: 83000879
- Added to NRHP: February 24, 1983

The Michigan Trust Company Building, also known as the Michigan Trust Building or just the Trust Building, is an office building located at 40 Pearl Street NW in Grand Rapids, Michigan. It was listed on the National Register of Historic Places in 1983.

== History ==
The Michigan Trust Company was established in 1889 by a group of Grand Rapids businessmen including Anton G. Hodenpyl and Lewis H. Withey. In 1890 the company purchased a plot of land on which to construct their headquarters building was to stand. The firm hired Chicago architect Solon S. Beman to design the building. Taking inspiration in the romanesque buildings of Spain and France, Beman designed the structure in the Romanesque Revival style, using red sandstone, red brick and terra-cotta as its facing materials, giving what was to become the city's tallest office building a distinctive, elegant appearance. Construction began in 1891 and the building was completed in 1892. The new building was the first structure in Grand Rapids constructed solely to house office space, and was at the time the tallest building in Grand Rapids and the second tallest in Michigan after the Hammond Building in Detroit. In 1913 the Michigan Trust Company constructed two ten-story additions located at the rear of the building. In the late 1920s, a small eleventh story was added to house the University Club and the Women's City Club.

The building became home to many of the leading professional firms in the city. In 1957 Old Kent Bank moved its headquarters to the building and began managing it. In 1967 the building was purchased by Alfred Taubman, who shortened the name to the "Trust Company Building," then the "Trust Building." A series of other firms owned the building, culminating with its 2012 purchase by CWD Real Estate.

== Description ==
The Michigan Trust Company Building is a ten-story, steel-frame, U-shaped office building measuring 128 by 132 feet (39.0 by 40.2 m). It is located on a corner with two street-facing facades. These facades consist of rock-face, red sandstone on the lower two stories and dark red brick trimmed with red terra cotta on the upper eight stories. The facades are further divided horizontally with trim work above floors seven and nine. Each facade contains 117 window openings, with round-head windows on floors two, seven, and nine, and square-head windows in the remaining floors.
