= Franklin Nicola =

American real estate developer

Franklin Felix Nicola (1860–1938) was an American real estate developer.

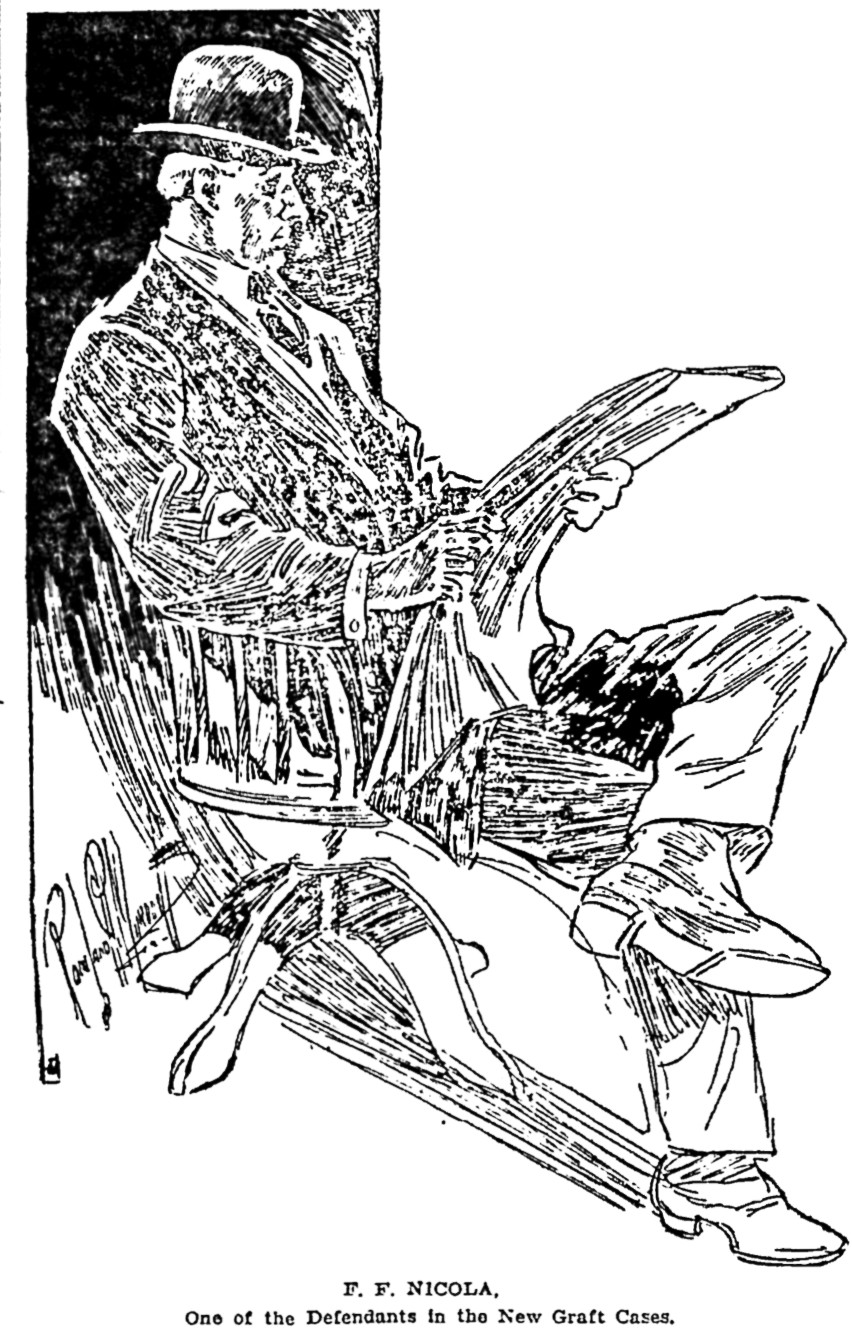
Newspaper sketch of F. F. Nicola reading a newspaper

== Biography ==
Nicola was a Cleveland businessman who moved to Pittsburgh during the 1890s.

In 1898, he opened the Hotel Schenley (now William Pitt Union).

During the early 20th century, he promoted and developed a civic center plan for the Oakland district of Pittsburgh, Pennsylvania—miles away from the city's smoky, congested downtown—as a new center for culture, art, and education. The plan was inspired by the City Beautiful movement.

Nicola was also key in the formation of the Bellefield Company, partnering with Pittsburgh businessmen Andrew W. Mellon, Henry Clay Frick, Andrew Carnegie, George Westinghouse, and H.J. Heinz, who were among the first stockholders. The Oakland plan unfolded on land once owned by fellow stockholder Mary Croghan Schenley. Nicola's company, Schenley Land Co., purchased the last of Mary Schenley's estate in 1905 and transformed the open acreage into a host of new urban landmarks: the Carnegie Museums of Pittsburgh, entire campuses both for the University of Pittsburgh and the Carnegie Institute of Technology (now Carnegie Mellon University), Forbes Field, Soldiers and Sailors Memorial Hall, the Masonic Temple (now the University of Pittsburgh's Alumni Hall), the Pittsburgh Athletic Association, Schenley Hotel, and an upscale residential neighborhood, Schenley Farms. Today Nicola's model urban suburb is a listed on the National Register of Historic Places as a historic district.
