= Dupee Estate–Mary Baker Eddy Home =

Historic house in Massachusetts, United States

Coordinates: 42°19′54.5″N 71°10′30.1″W

- Dupee Estate
- U.S. National Register of Historic Places
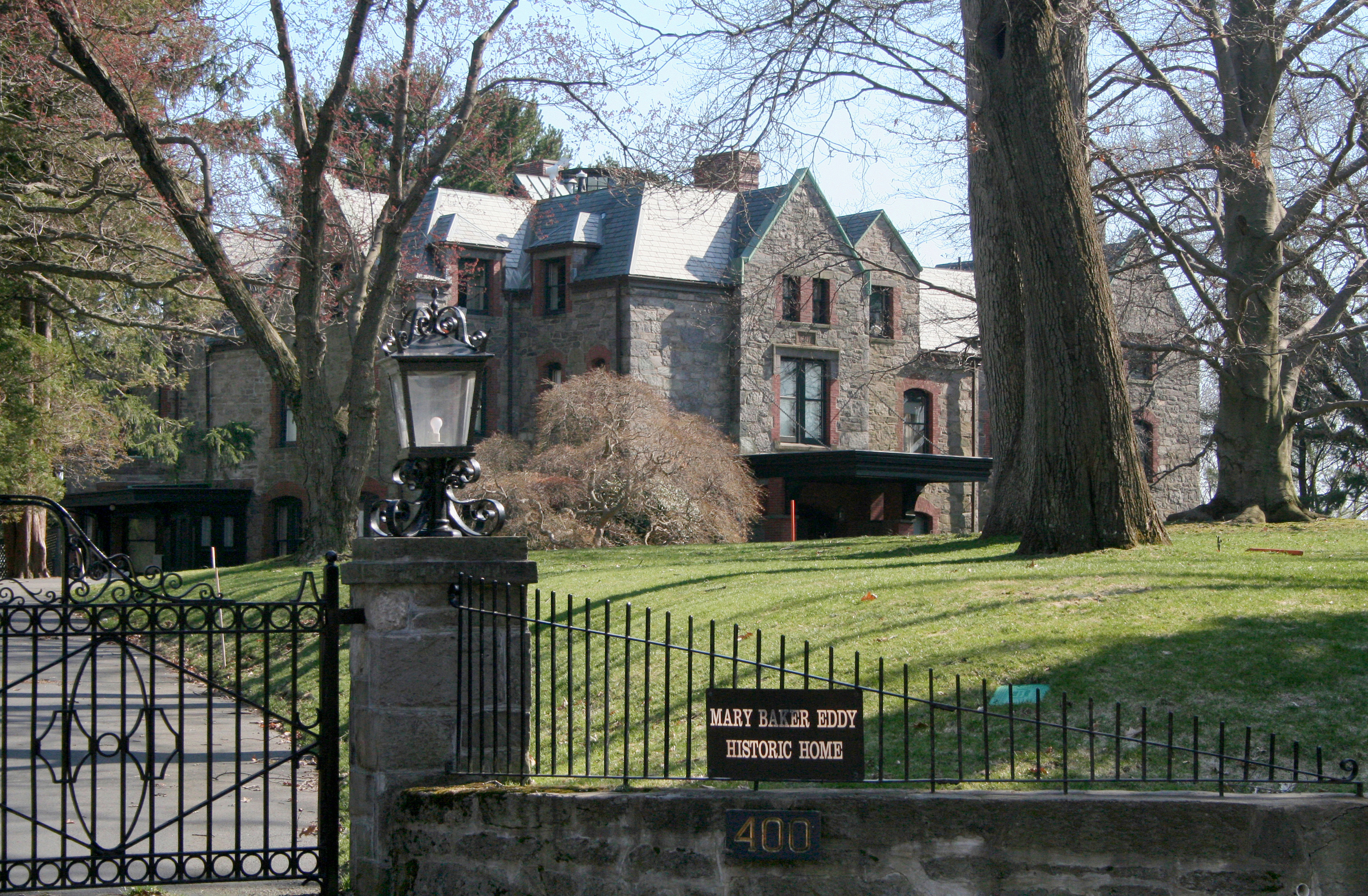
- Location: 400 Beacon Street; Chestnut Hill; Newton, Massachusetts
- Area: 8.3 acres (34,000 m^{2})
- Built: 1880–1881
- Architect: Peabody and Stearns
- NRHP reference No.: 86001790
- Added to NRHP: September 4, 1986

The Dupee Estate, located at 400 Beacon Street in the village of Chestnut Hill, Newton, Massachusetts, was the last home of Mary Baker Eddy, the founder of Christian Science.

== Property description ==
The property consists of an 8.3-acre (34,000 m^{2}) tract of land with a combination gate and carriage house located near the entrance from Beacon Street and the main house located to its southeast. There are also two smaller out buildings located southwest of the carriage house.

=== Main house ===
The architecture of the main house, built in 1880–1881 to a design by Peabody and Stearns, has been described variously as "Ruskinian Gothic" or "Gothic, Stick/Eastlake." The estate was added to the National Register on September 4, 1986, as outbuilding 86001790.

The main house has three stories and a basement, 25 rooms, four chimneys and 17,180 square feet (1,596 m^{2}) of space. The exterior walls are of puddingstone, granite and blue stone blocks, with brick window and door surrounds. The hip roof is black slate with red copper pans with multiple dormers and skylights. A major renovation of the mansion was undertaken in 1907–1908 to the designs of Chicago-based architect Solon Spencer Beman, in preparation for occupancy by Mary Baker Eddy and her executive staff and household helpers. The renovation transformed the massing and layout of the original mansion, introduced two elevators inside, and added a substantial new wing in the style of the original. (Beman had previously been the architect for Eddy on the design of the Extension of the Mother Church in Boston, as documented in Paul Eli Ivey's Prayers in Stone.)

=== Outbuildings ===
The gate-carriage house, built in 1892, has 6,575 square feet (611 m^{2}) of space, while the garage has only 670 square feet (62 m^{2}).

== History ==
=== Prior to Eddy ===
The main house was built in 1880 by William Richardson Dupee, who was born August 10, 1841, in Brighton and died January 19, 1911, in Brookline. In 1895 the estate was sold by the Dupee family to R. Ashton Lawrence.

=== Eddy years ===
Mary Baker Eddy bought the estate from R. Ashton Lawrence in October 1907, but she did not move in until after the addition had been completed in 1908. She used the house not only as her home but also as the office from which she oversaw the management of the church she had founded. Eddy died at home on December 3, 1910, and was buried in Mount Auburn Cemetery.

=== After Eddy ===
The estate at 400 Beacon Street was bequeathed by Eddy to her church which, for decades, maintained it as she had left it. It was open to the public for many years until escalating costs as well as the need for major repairs and renovations led the church to close it to the public. In April 2006, the church announced it would sell the house as part of an overall plan to reduce its involvement in managing real estate and to instead focus on its "spiritual priorities".

In December 2006 Longyear Museum, an organization dedicated to "advancing the understanding of the life and work of Mary Baker Eddy" and which owns several houses associated with her, purchased her last home from the church for $13,301,027. The sale did not include the furnishings and artifacts that had been in the home since her death in 1910. These were removed by the church before closing. In March 2007, Longyear paid $156,000 to obtain some pieces of furniture, rugs, and five of the seven carriages from the estate.

In 2016, the church donated two more carriages and a boat belonging to Mrs. Eddy to Longyear, along with the remaining furniture from the house. Other artifacts, including artwork and decorative items from the house, were given to Longyear by the church in 2017. In 2024, Longyear completed an extensive, award-winning restoration of the house and reopened it to public tours.

== See also ==
- National Register of Historic Places listings in Newton, Massachusetts
- Mary Baker Eddy Historic House for a list of the eight houses owned by the Longyear Museum.
