= First Church of Christ, Scientist (Chicago) =

Church in Chicago, IL, United States of America

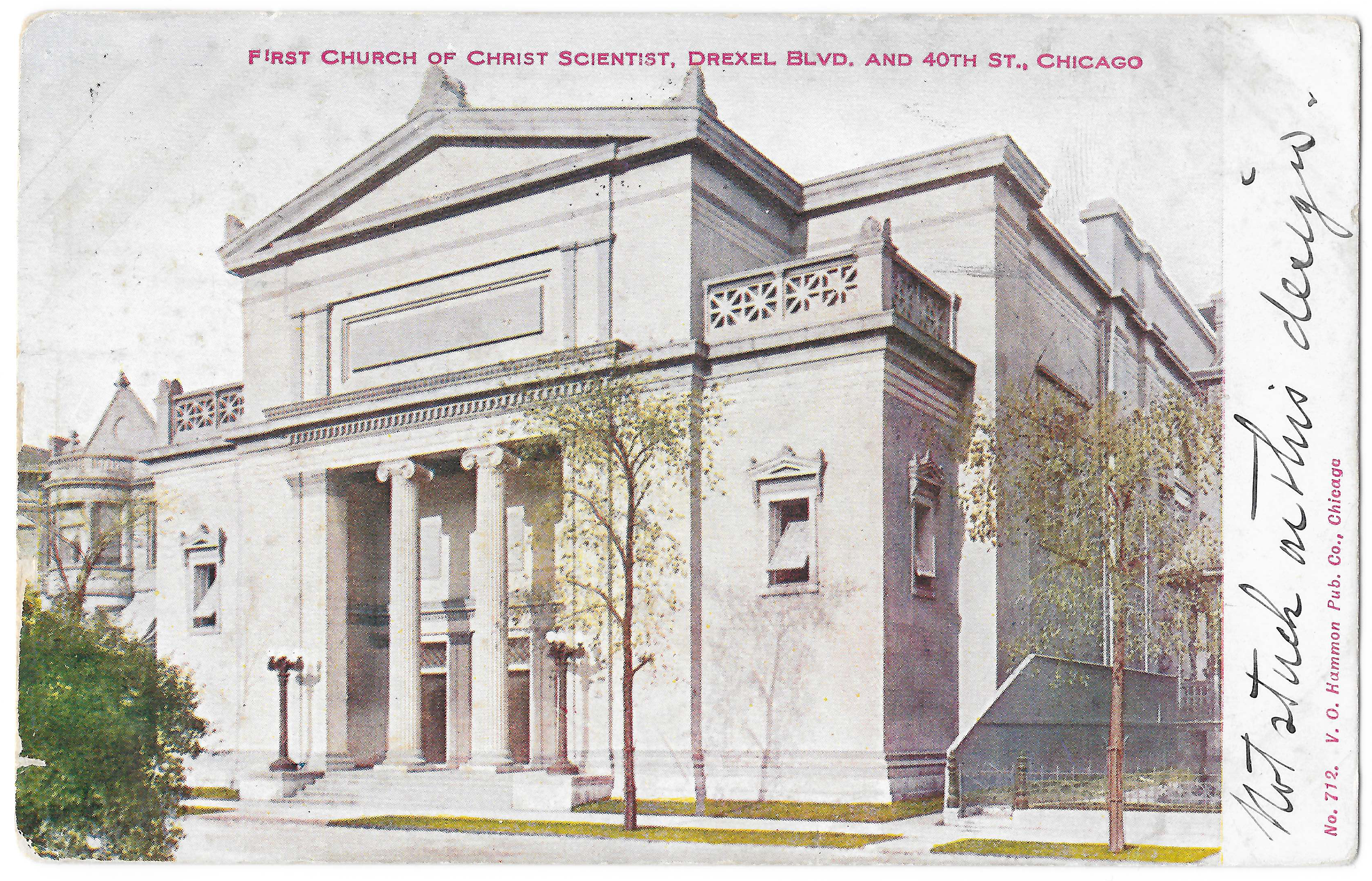
- Interactive map of the First Church of Christ, Scientist area

General information
- Architectural style: Neo-Classical
- Location: Chicago, Illinois, United States
- Coordinates: 41.8210°N 87.6045°W
- Completed: 1897
- Client: First Church of Christ, Scientist

Design and construction
- Architect: Solon Spencer Beman

The former First Church of Christ, Scientist, built in 1897, is a historic Neo-Classical-style church located at 4017 S. Drexel Boulevard in Chicago, Illinois. It was designed by noted Chicago-based architect Solon Spencer Beman, who was renowned for the churches and other buildings that he designed in the United States. In 1923 an Aeolian-Skinner organ was installed in the church. On May 7, 1950, Grant Memorial AME Church bought the building and is its present owner. First Church of Christ, Scientist, Chicago, is no longer in existence.

== See also ==
- First Church of Christ, Scientist (disambiguation)
- List of former Christian Science churches, societies and buildings

== Resources ==
- Faulkner, Charles Draper, Christian Science Church Edifices second edition, 1946, Chicago: self-published, has a photo on p. 60.
