= Liberty Tower (South Bend) =

Office building in Indiana, U.S.

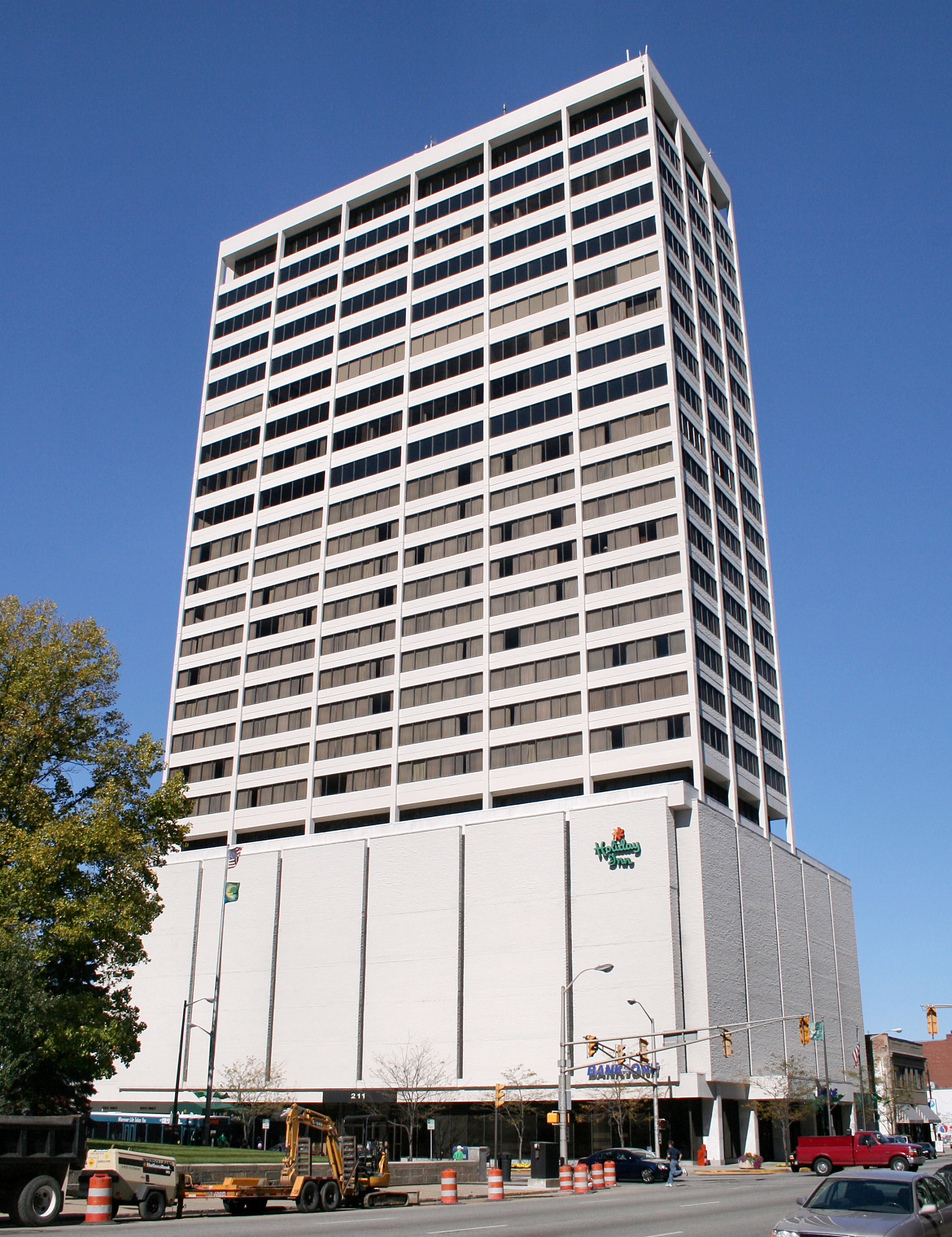
- Liberty Tower prior to 2019
- Interactive map of the Liberty Tower area
- Alternative names: Chase Tower

General information
- Status: Completed
- Type: Hotel, office, restaurant
- Location: South Bend, Indiana
- Coordinates: 41°40′36″N 86°15′9″W
- Construction started: 1968
- Completed: 1970
- Opening: late 1970
- Cost: $5.5 million USD
- Owner: Washington Square Realty

Height
- Roof: 331.99 ft (101.19 m)

Technical details
- Floor count: 25

Design and construction
- Architects: Kelley, Marshall & Associates

The Liberty Tower is a 25-story skyscraper in downtown South Bend, Indiana. Completed in 1970, its anchor tenant is now an Aloft Hotel.

== History ==
After the demolition of the Oliver Hotel in 1967, the then-called American National Bank Building was constructed beginning in 1968 and was topped out in 1970. Several years after its completion and grand opening in late 1970, its name was changed to the Valley National Bank Building.

== Architecture ==
The tower was built with a modernist design, with a concrete facade. It has a white base color, as well as gray and dark teal highlights.

== Tenants and usage ==
The current anchor tenant is the Aloft Hotel, which occupies most of the building. The WXYZ Lounge is located on the first floor. Floors two through eight host 220 parking spaces. Before the Aloft, a Holiday Inn operated the 185+ hotels rooms. The top floor had a private bar (the Summit Club) until it closed in 2012 due to low membership after 41 years in the building. Office space is available for rent.

== Renovations ==
The building has gone through two major renovations; in 1993, the tower's heating and cooling systems as well as the parking garage were upgraded. In 2015, after a water leak that caused occupants to vacate, the tower underwent a $40,000,000 renovation that included the addition of the new hotel and bar.

== See also ==
- List of tallest buildings in Indiana
- List of tallest buildings in South Bend
