= William Pitt Union =

- Schenley Hotel
- U.S. Historic district – Contributing property
- Pennsylvania Historical Marker signification
- Pittsburgh Landmark – PHLF
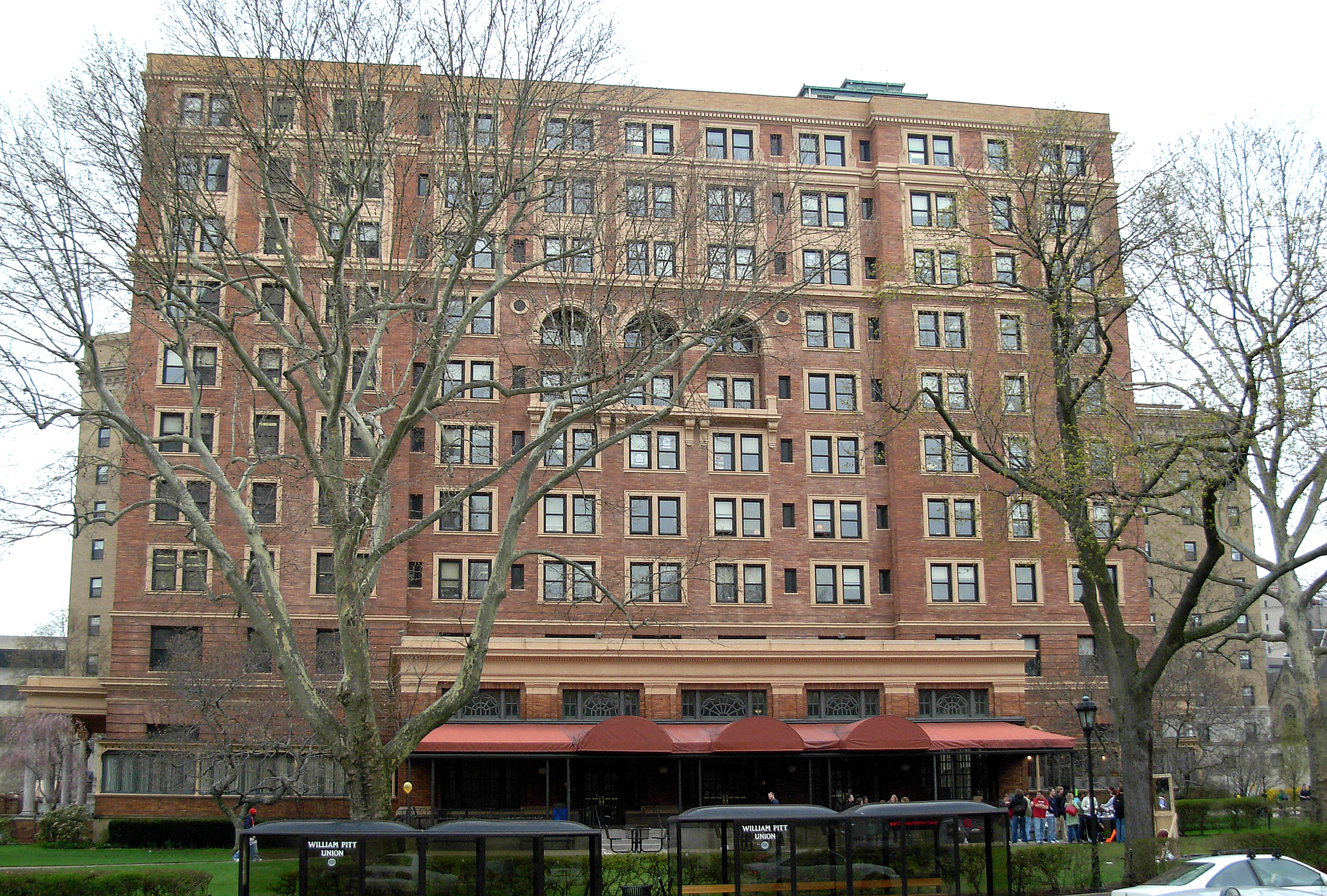
- The former Schenley Hotel, now William Pitt Union at the University of Pittsburgh
- Coordinates: 40°26′35.78″N 79°57′16.91″W
- Built: 1898
- Architect: Rutan & Russell
- Architectural style: Beaux-Arts
- Part of: Schenley Farms Historic District (ID83002213)

Significant dates
- Added to NRHP: July 22, 1983
- Designated PA: 1967
- Designated PHLF: 1984

The William Pitt Union, which was built in 1898 as the Hotel Schenley, is the student union building of the University of Pittsburgh main campus, and is a Pennsylvania and Pittsburgh History and Landmarks Foundation Historic Landmark.

Designed by Pittsburgh-based architects Rutan & Russell in the Beaux-Arts style of architecture, the Schenley Hotel catered to local and visiting well-to-do people. The University of Pittsburgh acquired the property in 1956.

== History ==
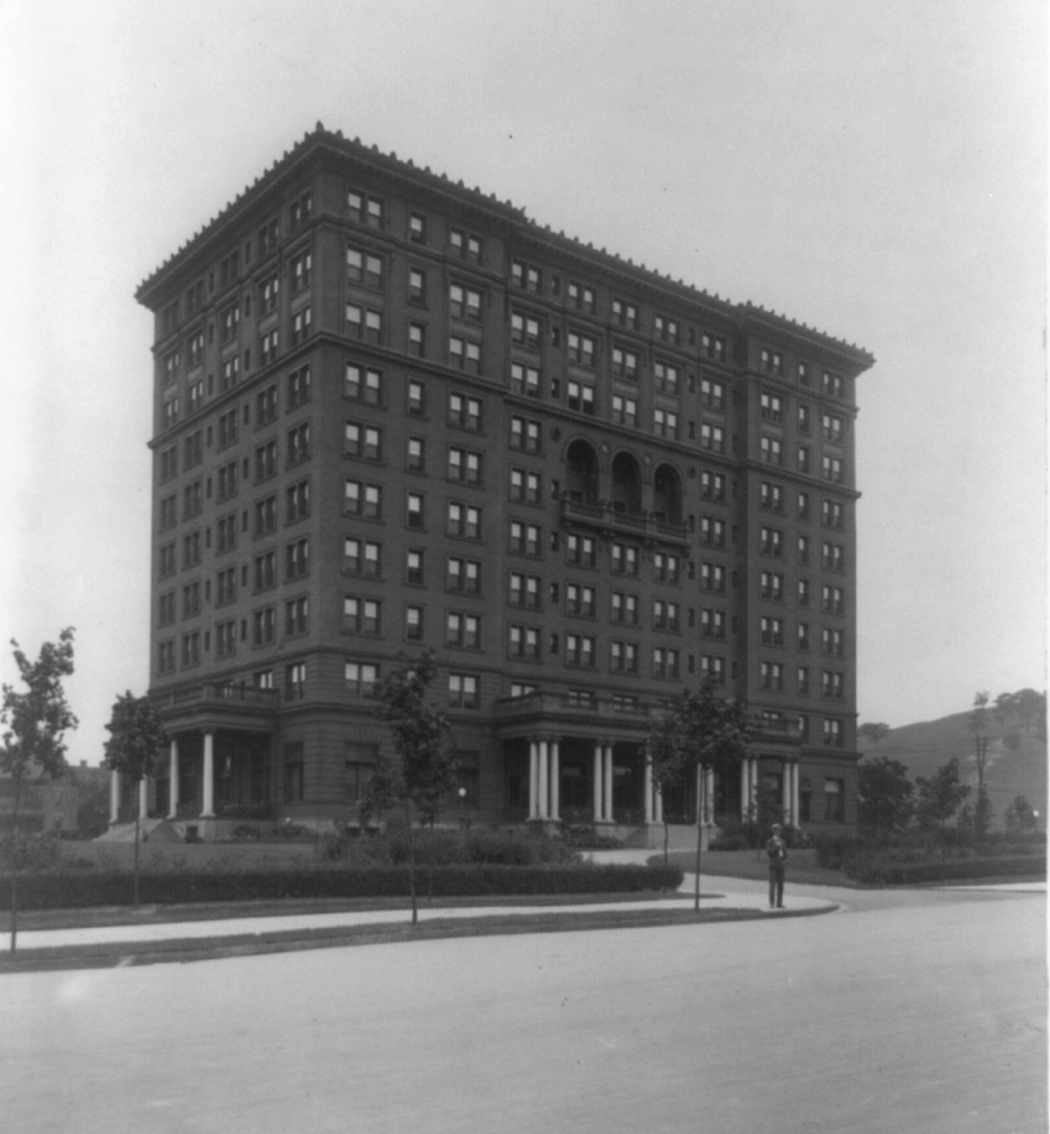
The Schenley Hotel circa 1900

=== The Schenley ===
This historic building, which was originally known as the Hotel Schenley, and designed by architects Rutan & Russell, opened in 1898. It became the keystone of entrepreneur Franklin Nicola’s dream of Oakland as a center for culture, art and education. Nicola had been instrumental in the formation of the Bellefield Company with the help of Andrew W. Mellon, Henry Clay Frick, Andrew Carnegie, George Westinghouse and H.J. Heinz, who were among the first stockholders to share Nicola’s vision for Oakland.

Nicola and his supporters oversaw construction of this beaux-arts structure on land that was once owned by fellow stockholder Mary Croghan Schenley.

The Schenley Hotel was Pittsburgh's first large, steel-framed "skyscraper hotel." It was described as "Pittsburgh's class hotel of the early 20th century".

=== Famous guests ===
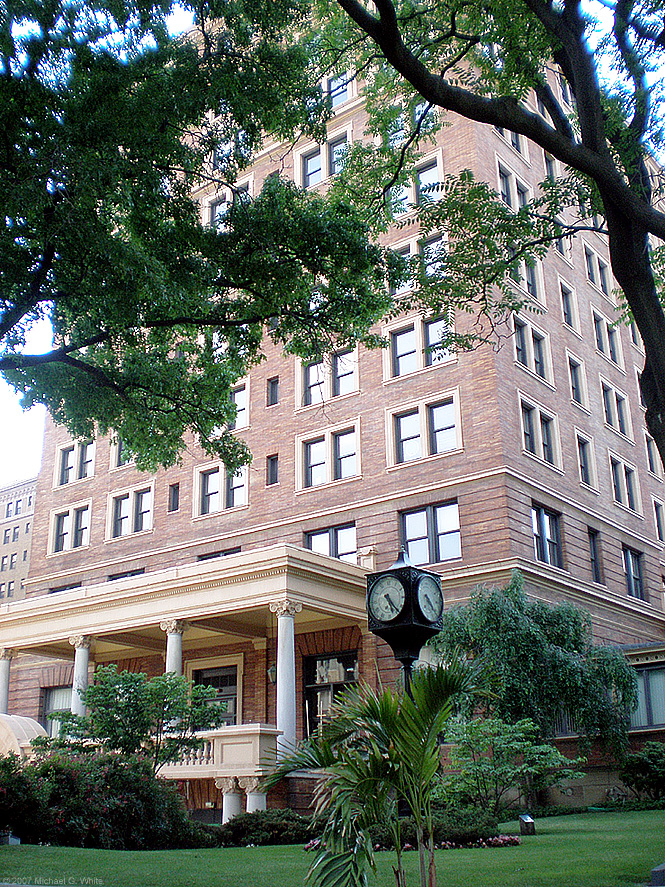
Forbes Avenue side of the William Pitt Union

Outfitted with marble accents, ornate chandeliers and Louis XV architecture, the Schenley quickly became the place to stay or eat in Pittsburgh for prominent travelers. Presidents Woodrow Wilson, Theodore Roosevelt, William Howard Taft, and Dwight D. Eisenhower signed the guest register here, as did Eleanor Roosevelt. Diamond Jim Brady was one of its diners.

Actors Sarah Bernhardt, Nelson Eddy, Jeanette MacDonald, Henry Fonda, Katharine Hepburn, and Spencer Tracy all stayed at the Schenley. Singer-actress Lillian Russell lived in suite 437 and was married to Pittsburgh publisher Alexander Moore in the French Room (now a dining room on the first floor). Opera star Enrico Caruso and his entourage occupied seven suites during their stay. Italian tragedian Eleonora Duse succumbed to pneumonia in suite 524.

The Schenley was not just the place to stay in Pittsburgh as the twentieth century began, it was where the young ladies of society "came out," where couples married, and where one could dine on the "haute cuisine" of the day. It was also the place where Pittsburgh power brokers met; many planning discussions related to the birth of the U.S. Steel Corporation were held here.

Its formation was celebrated at the "Meal of Millionaires" in 1901. In 1914, Pittsburgh's Veterans of Foreign Wars (VFW) chapter was organized here. In 1967, the Pennsylvania Historical and Museum Commission dedicated a historical marker outside of union to commemorate the event.

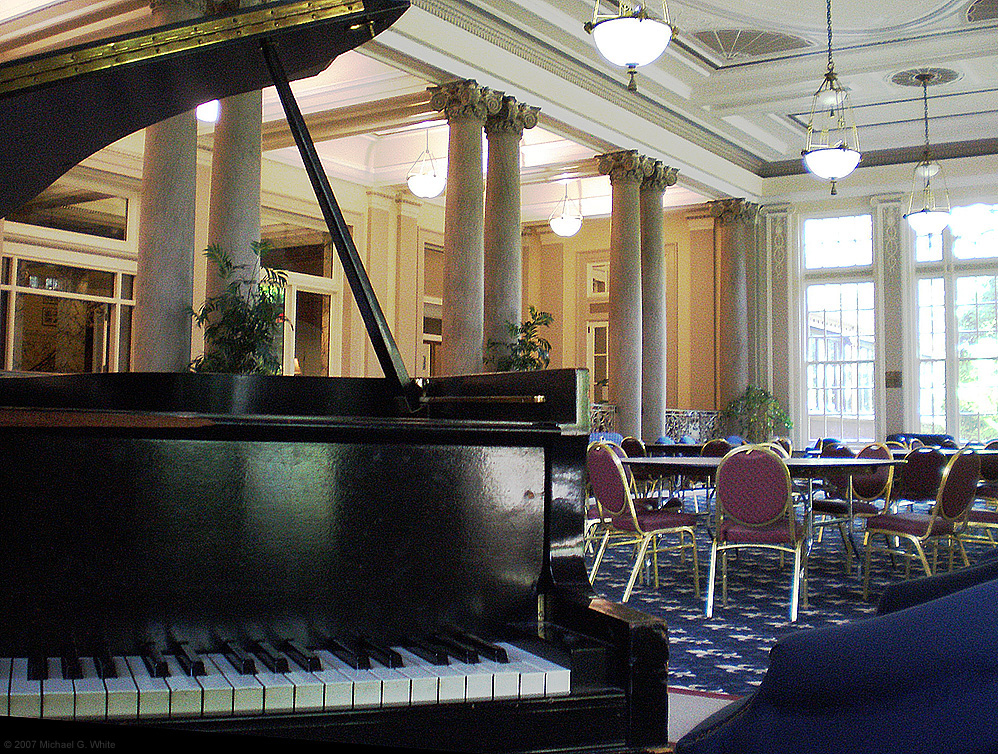
The Lower Lounge atrium in the William Pitt Union often serves as place of rest or study for students, or for university functions

1909 was a year that changed the Hotel Schenley forever. That summer, Forbes Field opened just down the street and the University of Pittsburgh moved from its Northside location to Oakland. From that time on, the "Waldorf of Pittsburgh" gradually became the home of the National League baseball players who were in town to play the Pittsburgh Pirates; students and faculty subsequently took their place among the Pittsburgh elite. Babe Ruth, Casey Stengel, Ty Cobb, and Rogers Hornsby all signed the guest register; baseball trades were finalized by club owners over dinner.

The Schenley continued to operate for more than forty years, albeit on a less grand scale. Surrounded by hospitals, educational facilities, concert halls, and private clubs with no parking to serve the hotel's mobile guests by the 1950s, it also faced new competition from Pittsburgh's Renaissance I.

=== A part of Pitt ===
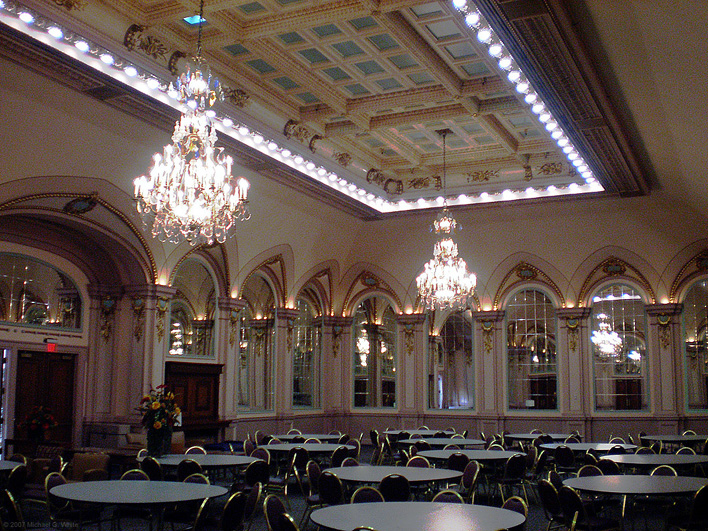
The William Pitt Union Ballroom

In 1956, the then Schenley Park Hotel was sold to the University of Pittsburgh. The hotel underwent a $1 million ($11.8 million in 2025 dollars) renovation to convert it to university use. The top four floors first served as a men's dormitory called Schenley House while the rest of the building was purposed as a student union, which was named Schenley Hall.

Shortly after this, during the height of the cold war in September 1959, the Schenley Hall ballroom in the union was the site of a luncheon for Nikita Khrushchev, chairman of the Soviet Union, and various Soviet and U.S. officials, including Henry Cabot Lodge Jr. that was hosted by the University of Pittsburgh and Pitt Chancellor Edward Litchfield. The last stop on Khrushchev's eleven-day transcontinental tour prior to a three-day conference with President Dwight D. Eisenhower, the event was described by The New York Times as the warmest of the tour.

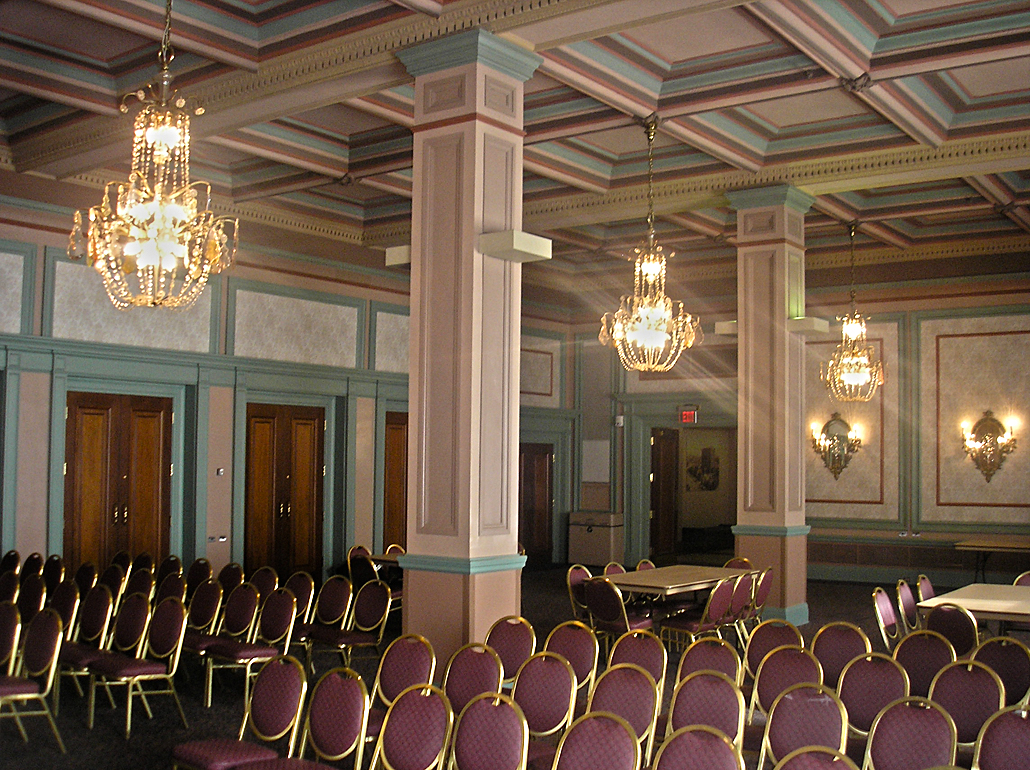
The Kurtzman Room

As the population of the Pittsburgh campus blossomed to 30,000-plus students and their activities diversified, it became clear that the grand structure needed an overhaul. In 1980, the university announced a $13.9 million ($54.3 million in 2025 dollars) renovation and restoration, made possible by bonds sold through the Allegheny County Higher Education Building Authority.

During the eighteen-month project and restoration, which was led by Williams Trebilcock Whitehead (now WTW Architects), seven upper floors were gutted to make way for modern offices for students and the student affairs administration. A tenth floor, which had been added several years after the hotel was first built, was removed to relieve stress on the building.

The turn-of-the-century character of the main floor was also restored through careful restoration of the Louis XV mirrored ballroom, as were the lower lounge that had enclosed the original Bigelow Boulevard-side porch thirteen years after the hotel was originally built, and the marbled-wall former hotel lobby, now called the Tansky Family Lounge, which includes the "stairway to nowhere," a remnant of a previous renovation. In addition, the rarely used basement was transformed into a functional lower level with a new Forbes Avenue Entrance and plaza.

The original wooden hotel room doors salvage from the upstairs renovation were used for the walls of the lower-level student recreation room, now called "Nordy's Place," and a third west entrance facing the university's Schenley Quadrangle and Litchfield Towers dormitories was added; that upgrade also included the addition of a new multi-level, glass-roofed atrium just inside the new entrance.

After the renovations were completed in 1983, the building was renamed as the William Pitt Union.

== Tragedies and legends ==
On July 12, 1950, a hotel night guard shot and killed two men and wounded another.

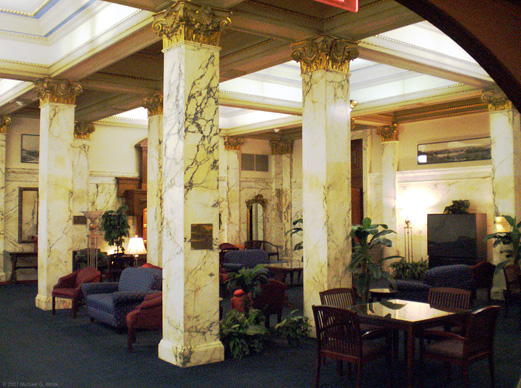
The Tansky Family Lounge in the William Pitt Union formerly served as the Schenley Hotel's lobby

A ghost story passed down among students begins with the tale of a visit by the Russian National Ballet, which booked accommodations in the historic Schenley Hotel prior to opening its tour of the United States in Pittsburgh. The prima ballerina, tired from travel, decided to rest before the premiere performance, drifted off, and slept through her curtain call and the whole of the performance. The company's director, either so incensed by her missing the premiere, or so impressed by the stage presence of her understudy, decided to replace the prima ballerina with a younger dancer for the remainder of the tour. Distraught by the change, the prima ballerina took her own life that night. It is now said that, if students fall asleep in the Tansky Family Lounge, also known as the Red Room, they always wake up just in time for whatever exam, class, meeting, appointment, etc. they may have missed because the prima ballerina's ghost makes sure they never succumb to her same fate.

Another tale tells of a haunting in the Lillian Russell Room, room 437 within the offices of The Pitt News, near Lillian Russell's former residence.

== Current use ==
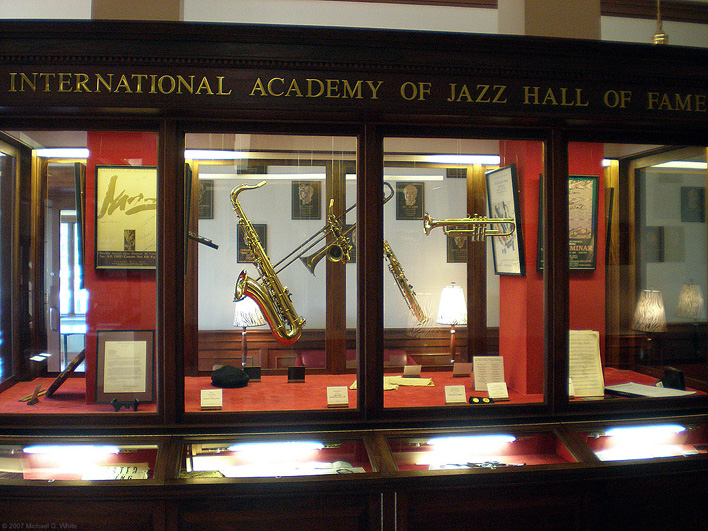
International Academy of Jazz Hall of Fame in the Union

The William Pitt Union now serves as the student union and hub of the University of Pittsburgh and contains a variety of lounges, ballrooms, reception, performance, and meeting spaces. One of the most notable facilities is the Louis XV-style William Pitt Union Ballroom on the main floor, which features vaulted ceiling, mirrored walls, two grand crystal chandeliers, and detailed moldings and artwork that are faithful restored to the condition of the Hotel Schenley. Other formal rooms include the Kurtzman Room and lower atrium of the Tansky Family lounge on the main floor, as well as two dining rooms on the first floor. The Tansky Lounge itself is the restored grand lobby of the hotel. In addition, the William Pitt Union Assembly Room, the largest room on the main floor at 6,200 square feet (580 m^{2}), contains a stage with theatrical lighting and serves as the facility's primary multi-purpose event space.

The William Pitt Union is also the home to the International Academy of Jazz Hall of Fame (dedicated in 1984), the C. M. Kimbo Art Gallery, a dance studio, meeting and conference rooms, university offices, and, on the lower level, a food court. The upper floors of the union serve as the primary location for the offices for more than three hundred student organizations, including the student newspaper, The Pitt News, the student radio station, WPTS and the student government.

The fourth floor is the site of the Lillian Russell Room of The Pitt News. It contains a portrait of Russell, a fireplace, stained glass fanlight and decorative moldings.

In 2007, the recreation room on the ground floor of the union was renovated and by resolution of the Pitt Student Government Board, and was then renamed "Nordy's Place" in honor of Chancellor Mark Nordenberg. Gigs Game Center, outfitted with videogame hardware and software, is also located on the lower level.

In 2009, renovations to the second floor improved the accommodations of the student careers center and renovations to the fifth floor were completed to provide six new meeting spaces for student organizations, four of which with hard-surface flooring enabling groups to practice dance routines and other activities. In addition, a formal area was created for student organizations to host workshops and award presentations.

In 2010, a $2 million project was undertaken to renovate 9,200 square feet (850 m^{2}) of space on the ninth floor. The renovation, completed in 2011, created a new student study and lounge area, a twenty-person conference room, a kitchen/coffee area, file/storage areas, and new offices for Residence Life, Pitt Arts and Student Volunteer Outreach.

A $1.93 million renovation of the Assembly Room, which included uncovering three large windows to allow in natural light, as well as a stage extension and technology upgrades, was completed in 2013. In addition, a $390,000 renovation of first floor restrooms and $1.85 million renovation of the lower levels of the union, including its food court and dining spaces, was completed that same year.

== Gallery ==
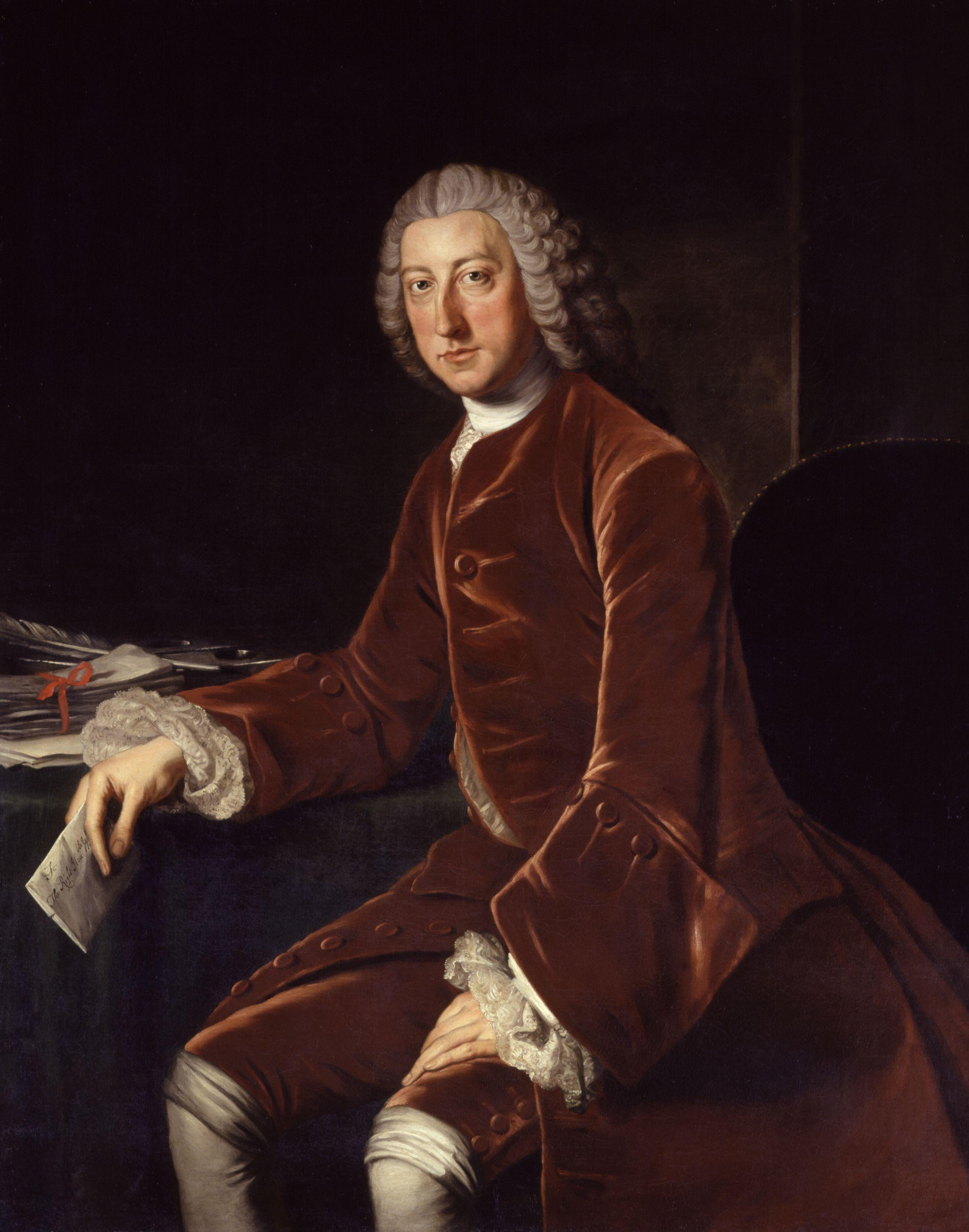
William Pitt, namesake of city, university, and student union

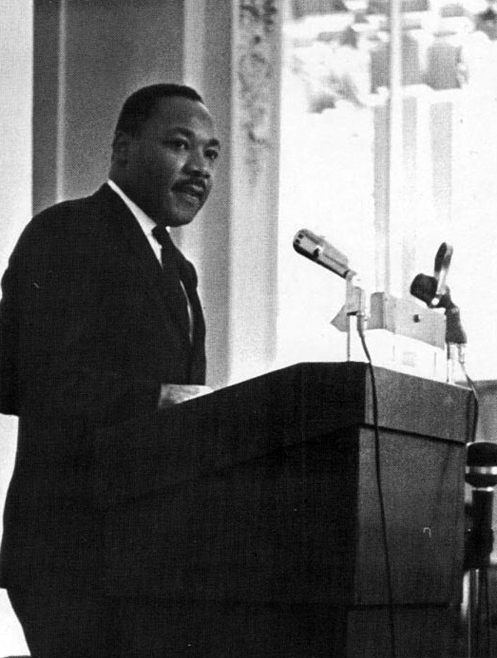
Martin Luther King Jr. delivering a speech to Pitt students and faculty in the William Pitt Union ballroom on November 2, 1966

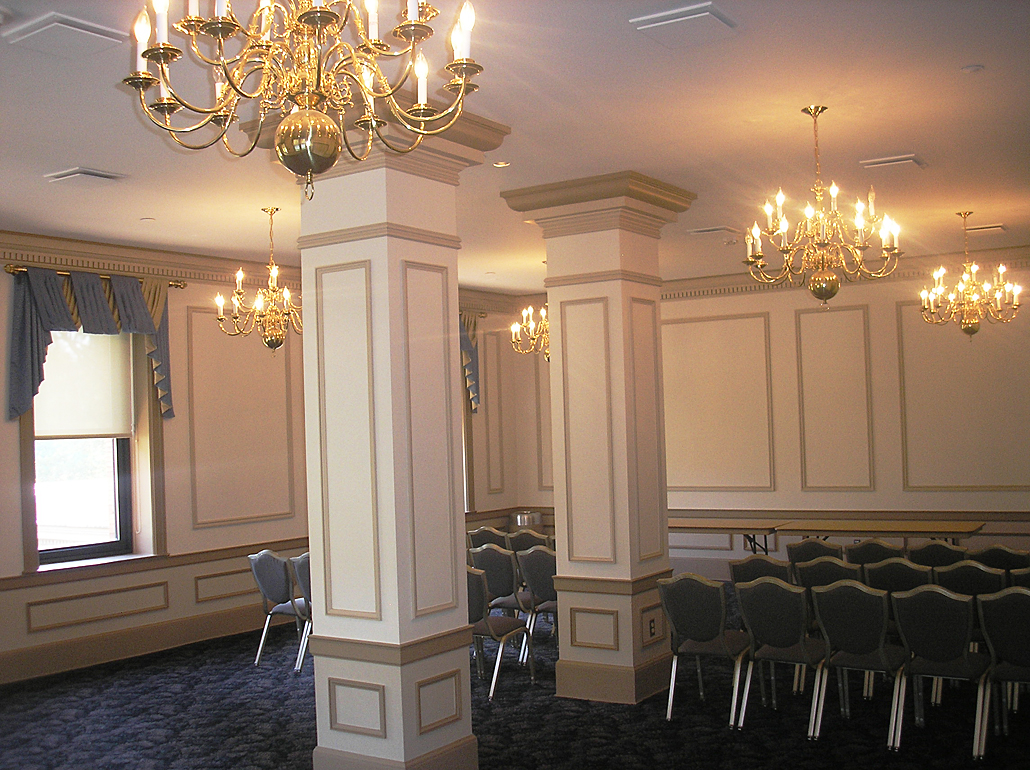
Dining Room A was known as the French Room when it was still the Schenley Hotel and held several weddings, including actress Lillian Russell's

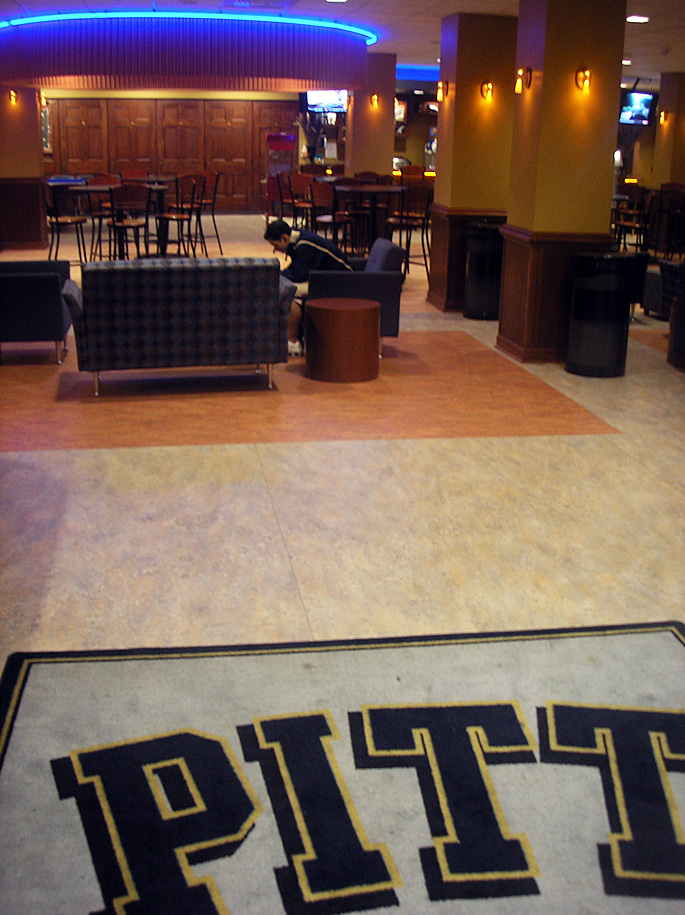
Nordy's Place in the lower level of the William Pitt Union

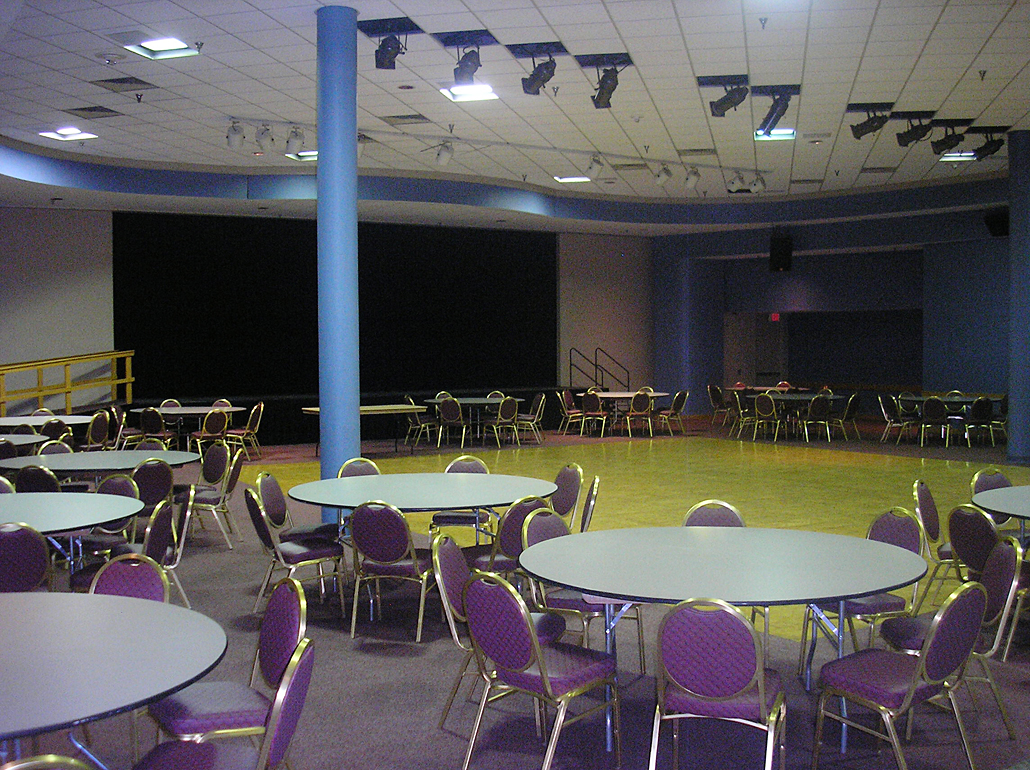
The Assembly Room, as seen prior to its 2013 renovations, holds a variety of large meetings and functions

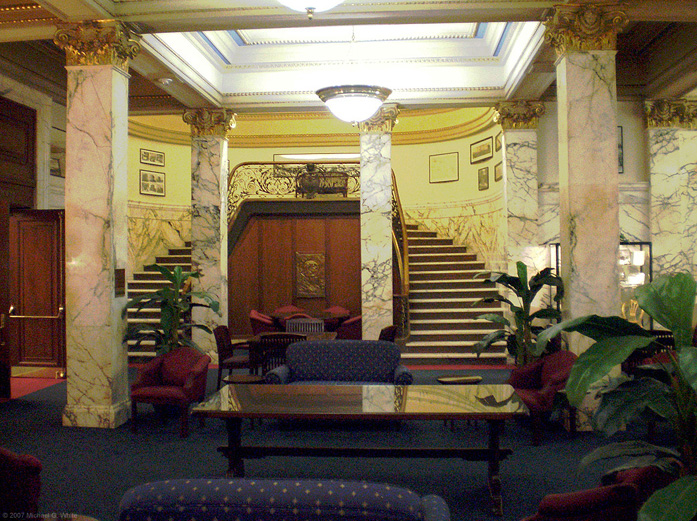
The "Stairway to Nowhere" with a bronze tablet in honor of Eleanora Duse by Frank Vittor located in the Tansky Family Lounge

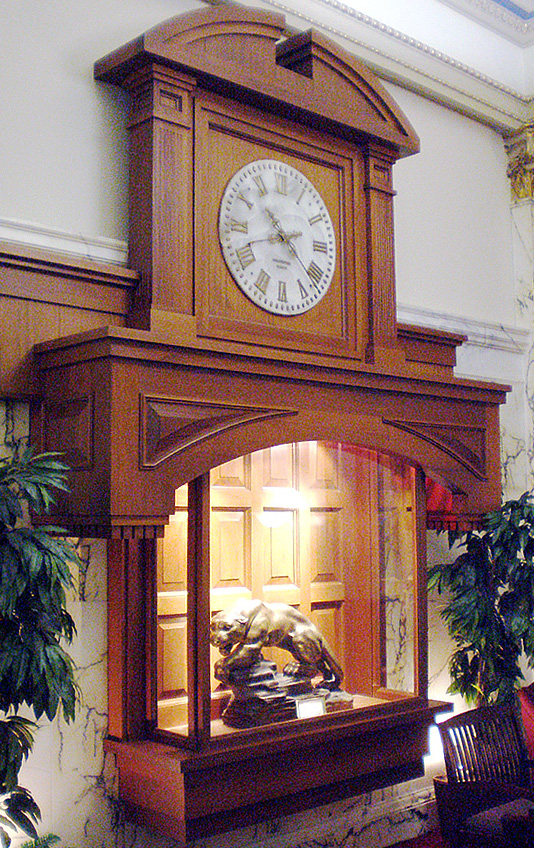
Panther (1897) by Giuseppe Moretti in the Tansky Lounge

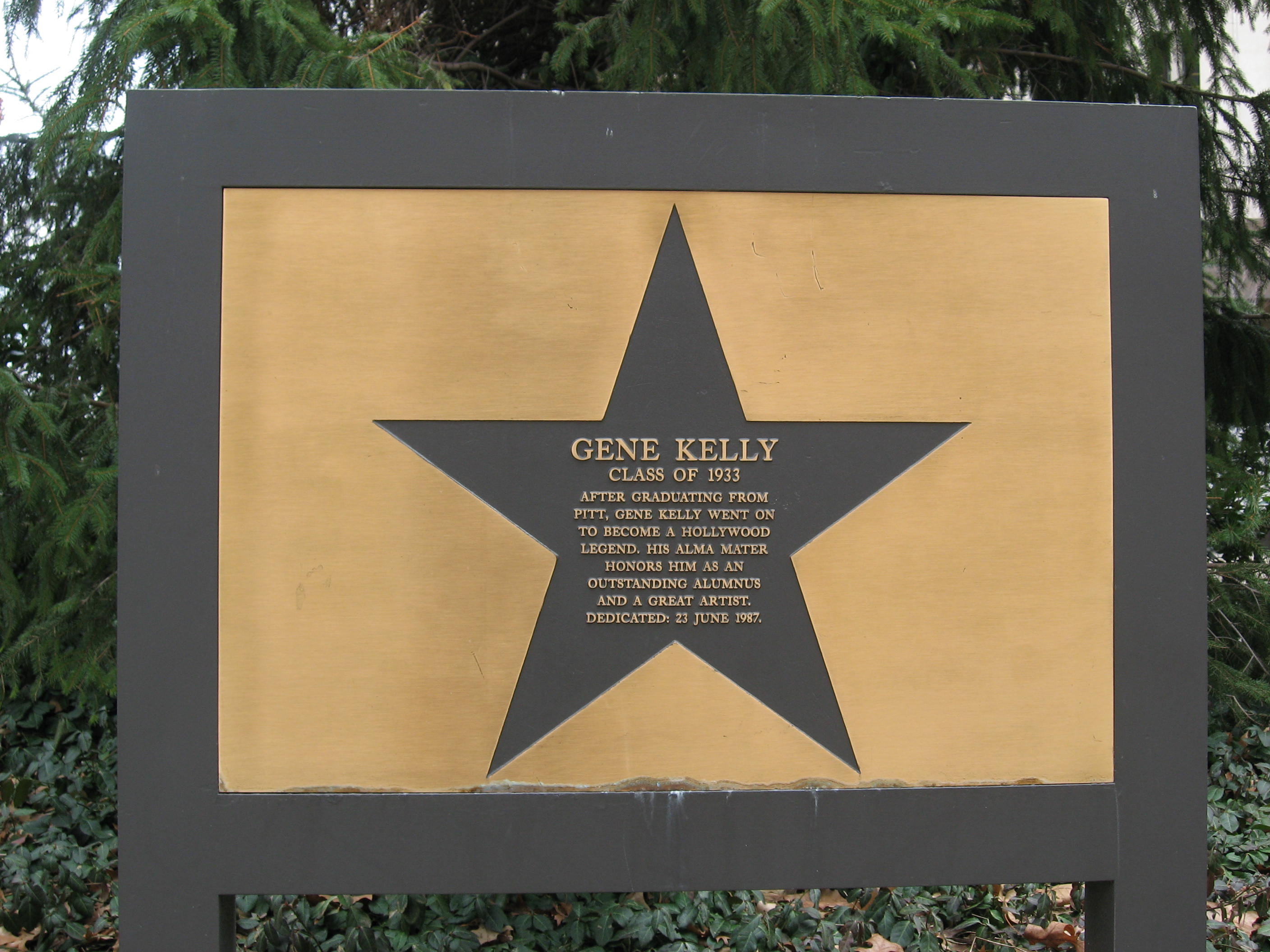
Gene Kelly star near the Forbes Avenue entrance

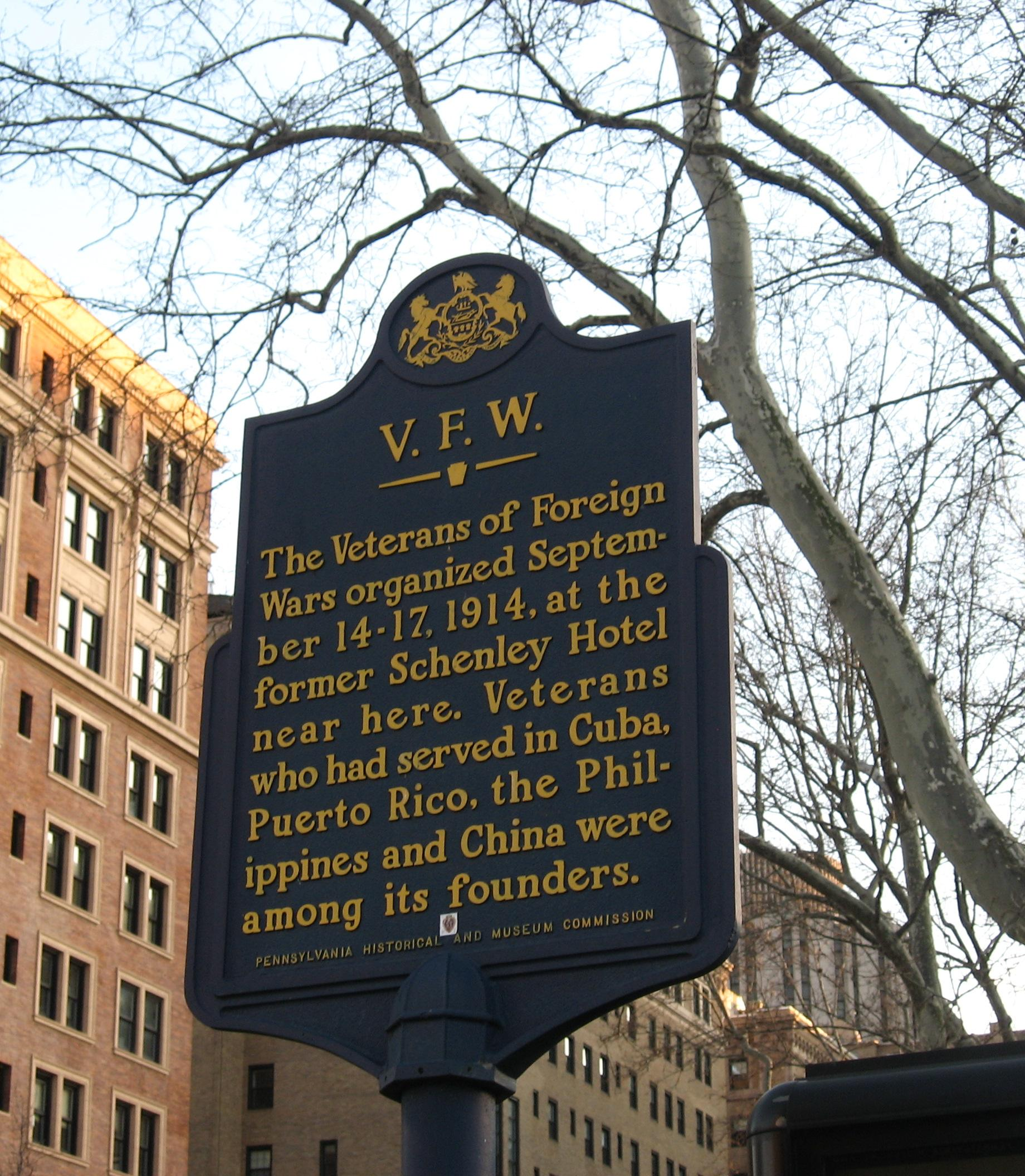
State historical marker

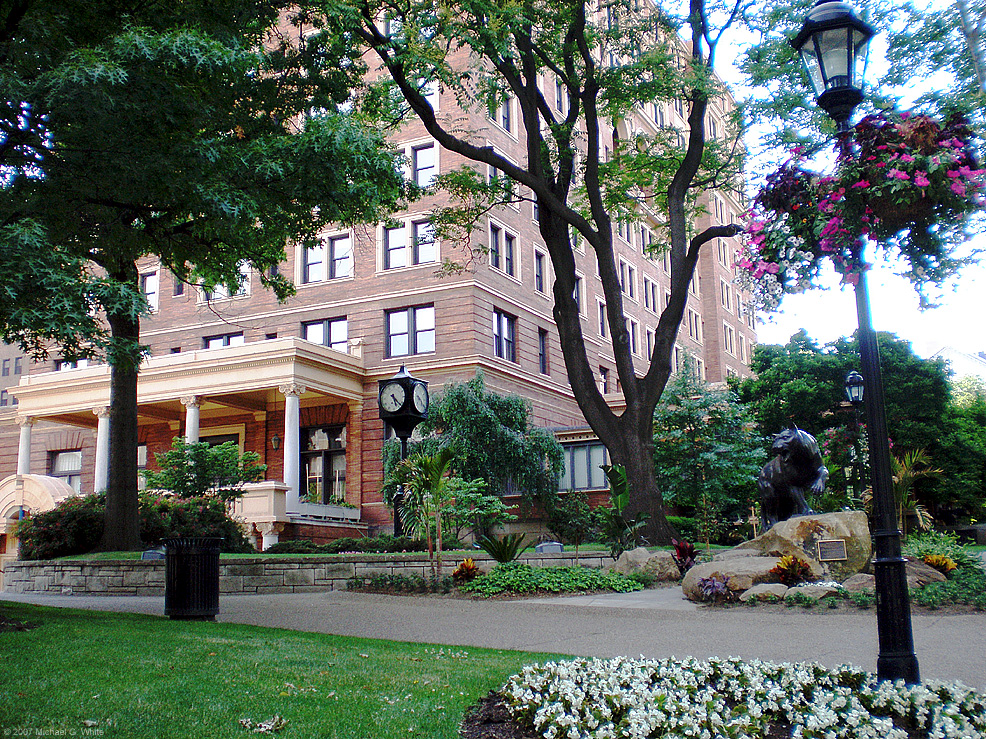
Union Lawn

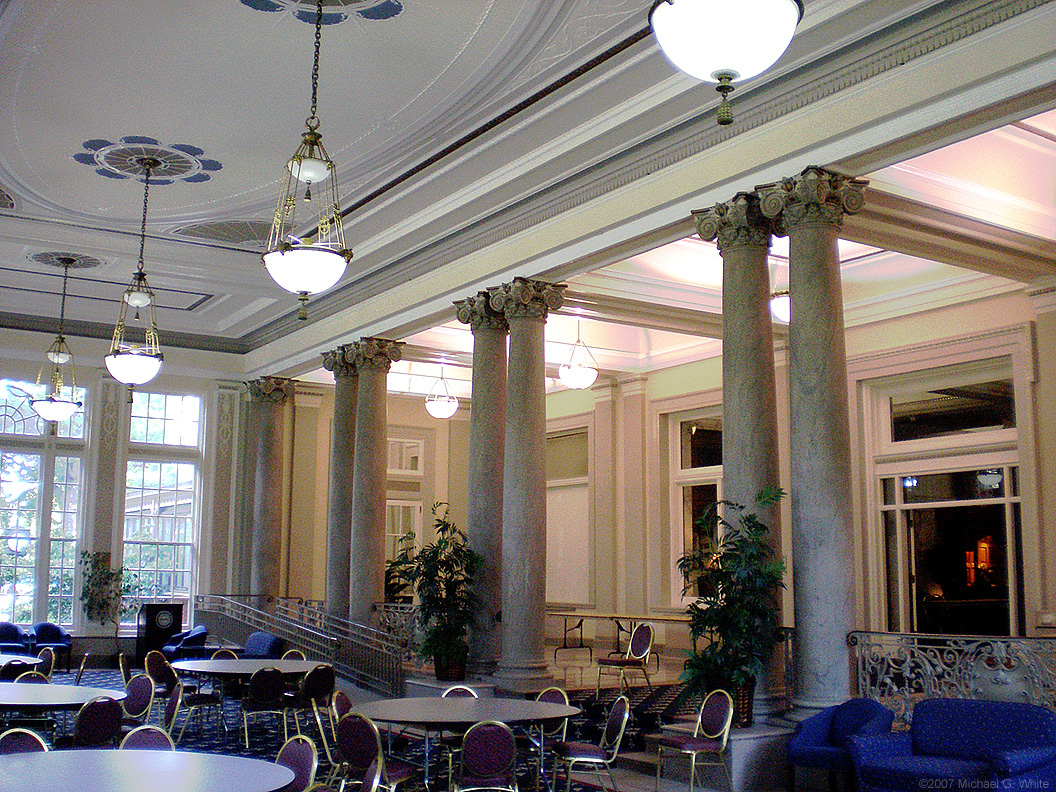
Lower atrium

Preceded by Chancellor's Residence	University of Pittsburgh buildings William Pitt Union; Constructed: 1898	Succeeded by University Child Development Center
