= Hoffman Hotel (South Bend, Indiana) =

- U.S. National Register of Historic Places
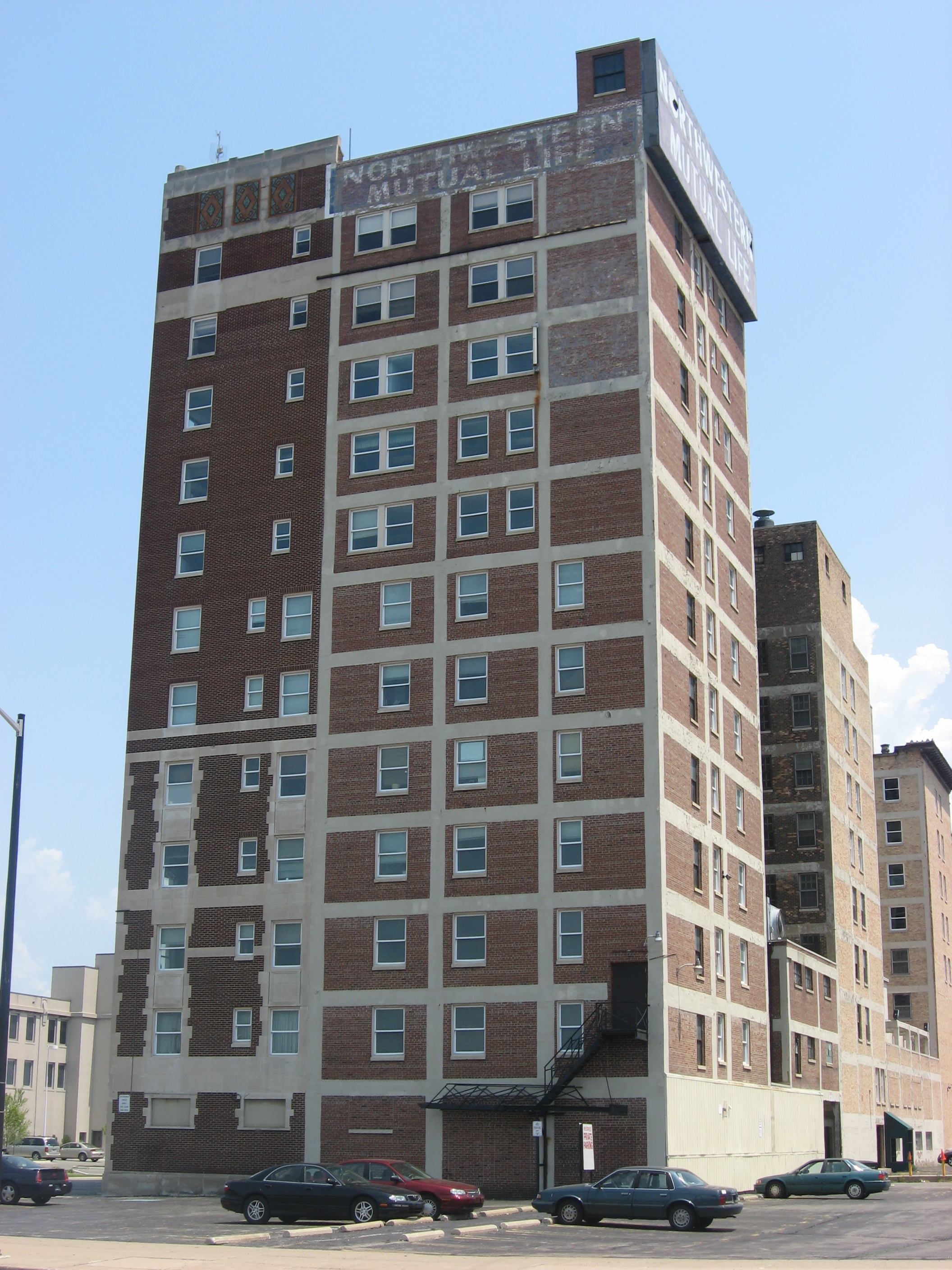
- Hoffman Hotel, July 2012

- Location within Indiana Location within the United States
- Location: 120 W. LaSalle, South Bend, Indiana
- Coordinates: 41°40′44″N 86°15′4″W
- Area: less than one acre
- Built: 1930
- Architect: Ellwood, Willard M.
- MPS: Downtown South Bend Historic MRA
- NRHP reference No.: 85001214
- Added to NRHP: June 5, 1985

Hoffman Hotel is a historic hotel building located at South Bend, Indiana. It was built in 1930, and is a 12-story, red brick building with limestone trim and terra cotta mosaic tile panels in an eclectic style. It originally housed 21 small apartments and 150 hotel rooms. It is located next to the LaSalle Hotel.

It was listed on the National Register of Historic Places in 1985.
