= J.M.S. Building =

- J. M. S. Building
- U.S. National Register of Historic Places
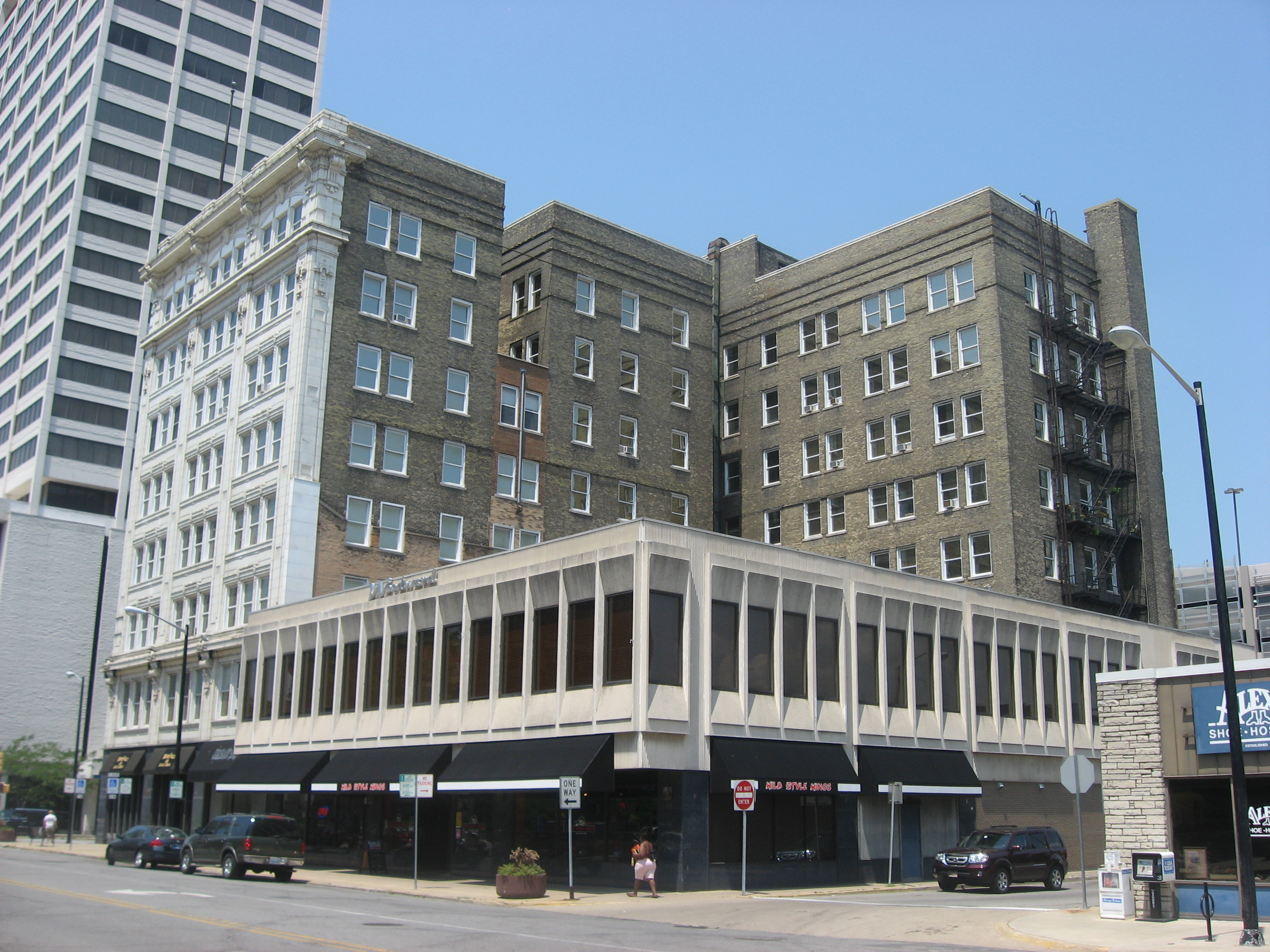
- J.M.S. Building from the rear, July 2012

- Location within Indiana Location within the United States
- Location: 108 N. Main, South Bend, Indiana
- Coordinates: 41°40′36″N 86°15′5″W
- Area: less than one acre
- Built: 1910
- Architect: Beman, Solon S.
- Architectural style: Classical Revival, Chicago, The Commercial Style
- MPS: Downtown South Bend Historic MRA
- NRHP reference No.: 85001216
- Added to NRHP: June 5, 1985

The J. M. S. Building is a historic office building located at 108 North Main Street, South Bend, Indiana.

== Description and history ==
It was designed by architect Solon Spencer Beman (1853–1914) and built in 1910. It is an eight-story, Commercial style brick and white terra cotta building with Classical Revival style design elements. It features large round arched windows at the eighth floor and a projecting cornice with brackets on the front facade. The J.M.S. Building was built by John Studebaker (1833–1917), co-founder and later executive of what would become the Studebaker Corporation.

It was listed on the National Register of Historic Places on June 5, 1985.
