= University Child Development Center =

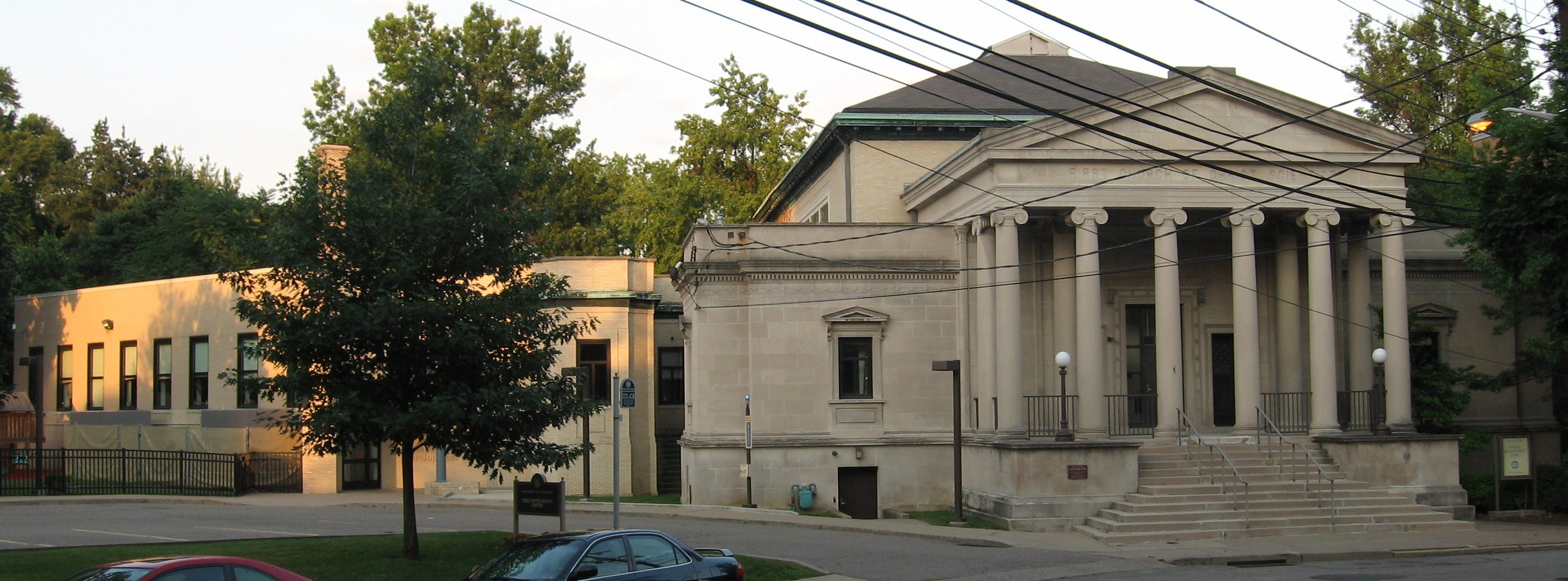
- The University of Pittsburgh's University Child Development Center

- Location of UCDC in Pittsburgh
- 40.448169°N 79.945213°W
- Location: 635 Clyde Street, Shadyside neighborhood, Pittsburgh, Pennsylvania

History
- Built: 1904–1905

Site notes
- Architect: Solon Spencer Beman
- Architectural style: Neo-classical
- Governing body: University of Pittsburgh

Pittsburgh Landmark – PHLF
- Designated: 1977

The University Child Development Center (UCDC) at the University of Pittsburgh is a child care and early childhood education center. It is located on Clyde Street in Shadyside, just east of the main Oakland campus, approximately one half mile from the center of campus at the Cathedral of Learning, and adjacent to the rear property of the university's Chancellor's Residence on the Oakland-Shadyside border in Pittsburgh, Pennsylvania.

== Services ==
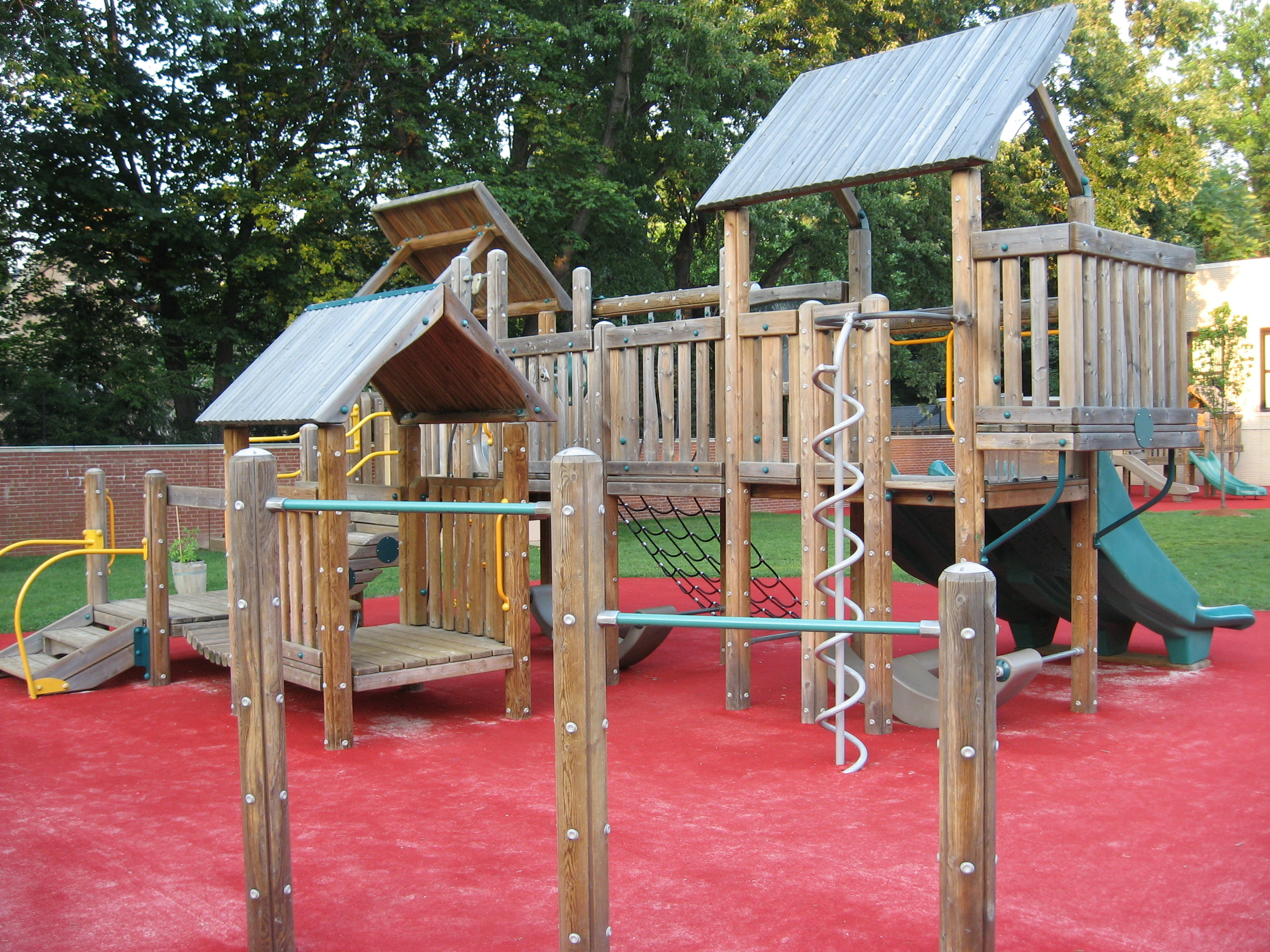
UCDC playground

The University Child Development Center serves as a near-site child care and early childhood education center for children ranging in age from six weeks through six years who belong to the faculty, staff, and students of the University of Pittsburgh. The UCDC also provides laboratory, research, and practicum experiences in observing and participating with young children in classroom-based settings, for Pitt students, and students from other institutions of higher learning. The UCDC also provides resources and technical assistance in implementing appropriate programs and practices that serve young children in Pittsburgh and other communities.

The UCDC facility houses classrooms including four infant rooms, four toddler rooms, two three-year-old preschool rooms, and two four to six-year-old preschool rooms. Each room is age-appropriate for the group occupying the space. The UCDC also includes two large motor rooms (one for infants and toddlers and the other for preschool children) and an outdoor playground facility.

== History ==
=== First Church of Christ, Scientist ===
Built in 1904–1905, the church building of the First Church of Christ, Scientist was designed in the Classical Revival-style of architecture by noted Chicago architect Solon Spencer Beman, and built at 635 Clyde Street, in the Shadyside section of Pittsburgh. In 1977, it was designated a local historic landmark by the Pittsburgh History and Landmarks Foundation,

The building was sold in 1992 to the University of Pittsburgh. First Church of Christ, Scientist, now holds services at 201 North Dithridge at Bayard Street, in the Oakland section of Pittsburgh.

The university acquired the building in the fall of 1992 for $1.015 million.

=== UCDC opening ===
In 1994, Pitt proceeded with a $2 million renovation of the building to accommodate the UCDC, which opened its doors in the facility on May 30, 1995 after having previously been located in Bellefield Hall.

In 2005, First Church of Christ, Scientist was determined by the city of Pittsburgh's Historic Review Commission and the Department of City planning to be eligible for listing on the National Register of Historic Places.

== Gallery ==
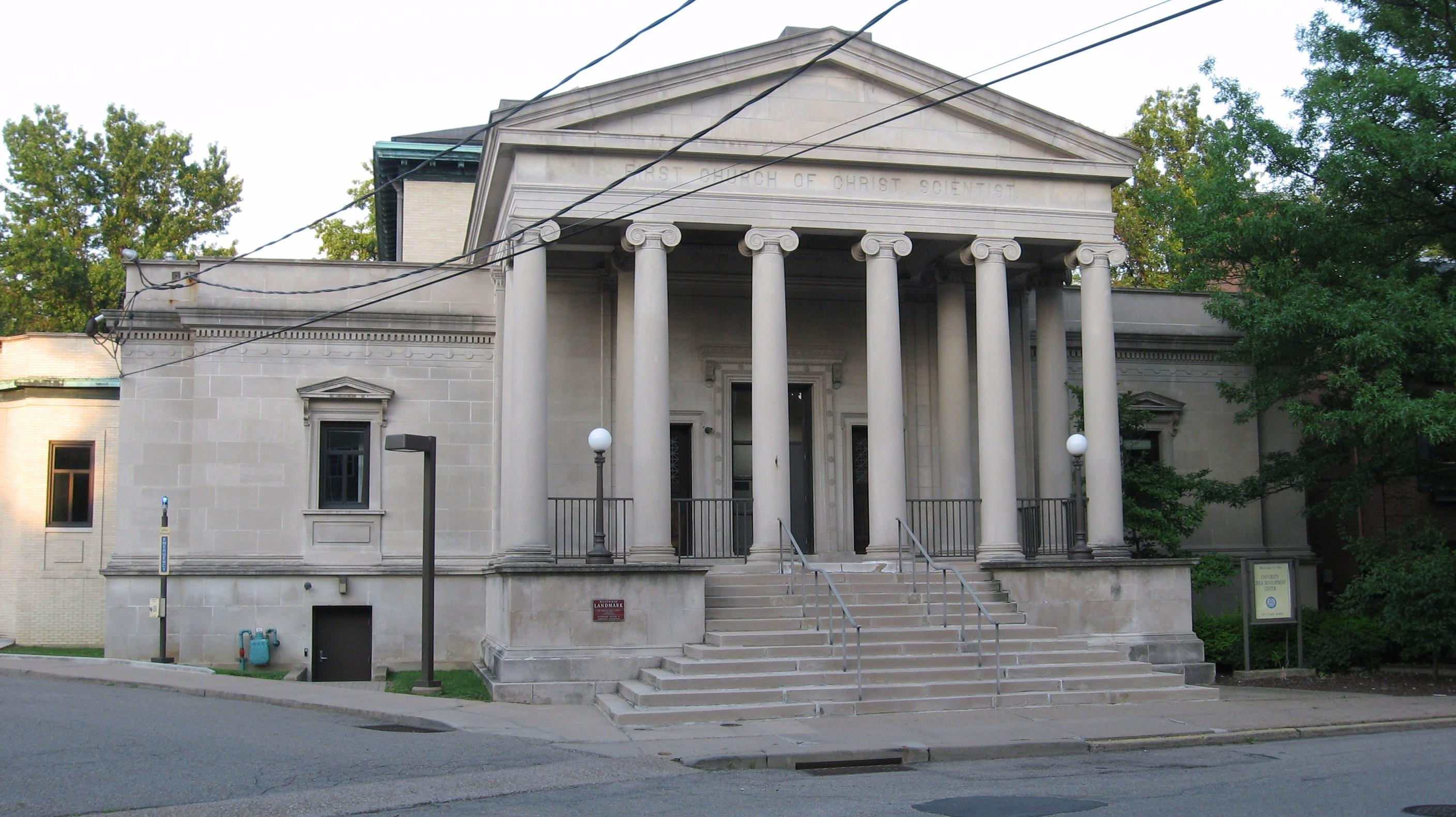

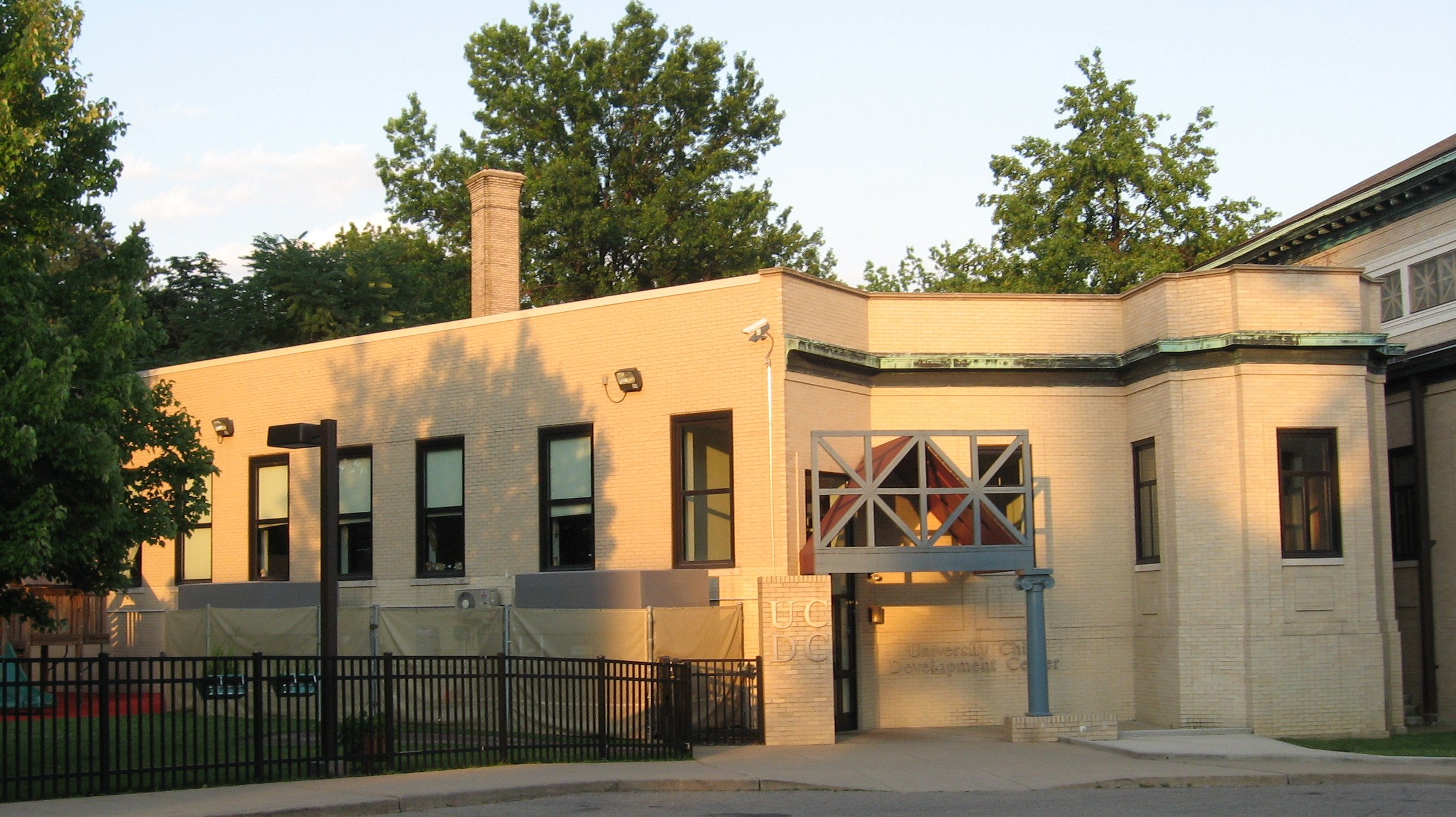

== See also ==
- List of University of Pittsburgh buildings
- List of former Christian Science churches, societies and buildings
- List of Pittsburgh History and Landmarks Foundation Historic Landmarks

Preceded by William Pitt Union	University of Pittsburgh buildings University Child Development Center; Constructed: 1904-1905	Succeeded by Thaw Hall
