= LaSalle Hotel (South Bend, Indiana) =

- U.S. National Register of Historic Places
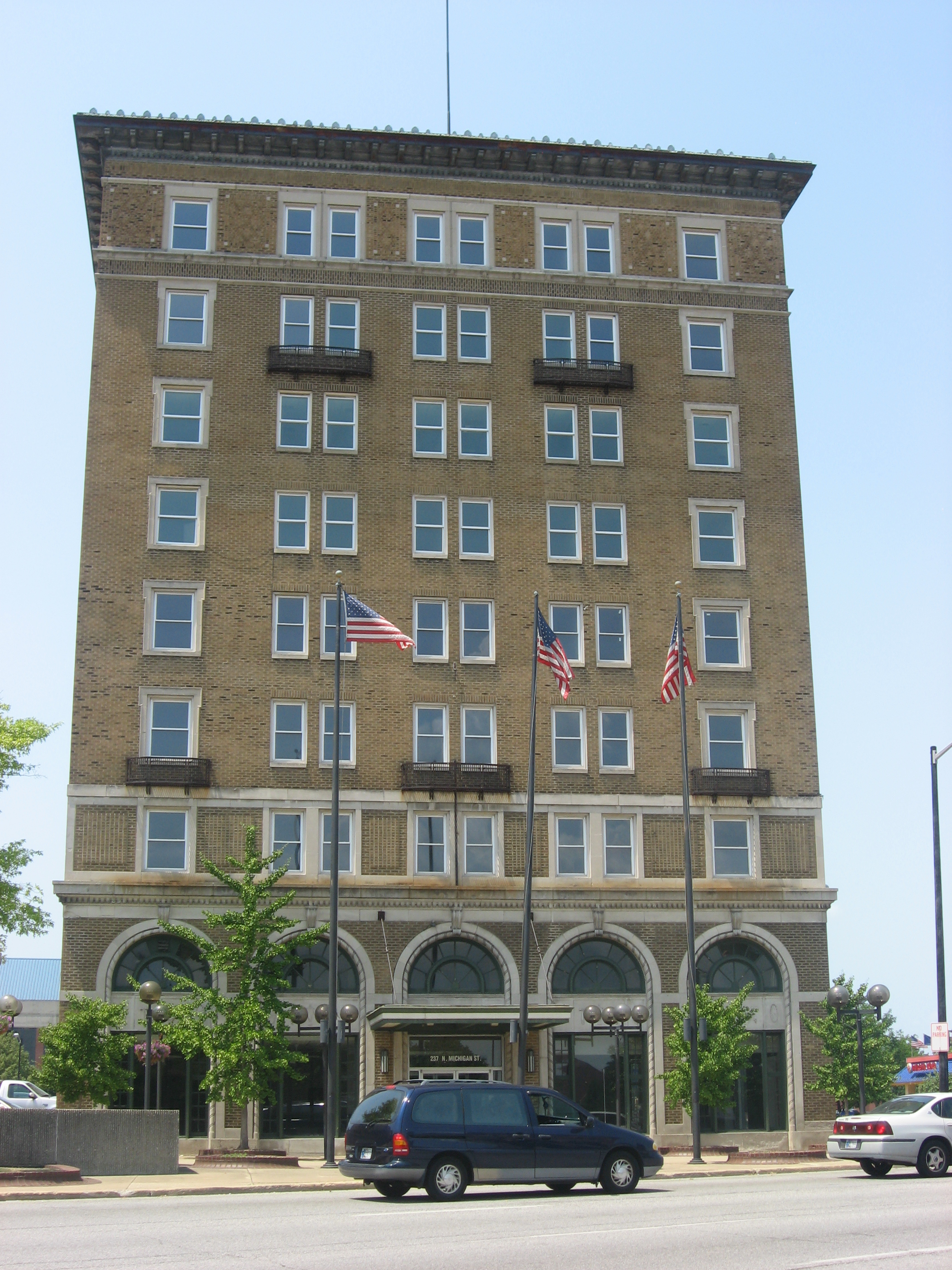
- LaSalle Hotel, July 2012

- Location within Indiana Location within the United States
- Location: 237 N. Michigan, South Bend, Indiana
- Coordinates: 41°40′44″N 86°15′2″W
- Area: less than one acre
- Built: 1921
- Architectural style: Chicago, Classical Revival
- MPS: Downtown South Bend Historic MRA
- NRHP reference No.: 85001221
- Added to NRHP: June 5, 1985

LaSalle Hotel is a historic hotel building located at South Bend, Indiana. It was built in 1921, and originally housed 223 hotel rooms. It is a nine-story, Commercial style brick building with terra cotta trim and a wide overhanging cornice. It is located next to the Hoffman Hotel and across the street from where the Chicago South Shore and South Bend Railroad's original South Bend station were once located. A tunnel connected the station and the hotel.

The LaSalle Hotel was listed on the National Register of Historic Places in 1985.
