= Harry W. Jones House =

Historic house in Minnesota, United States

- U.S. National Register of Historic Places
- Minneapolis Landmark
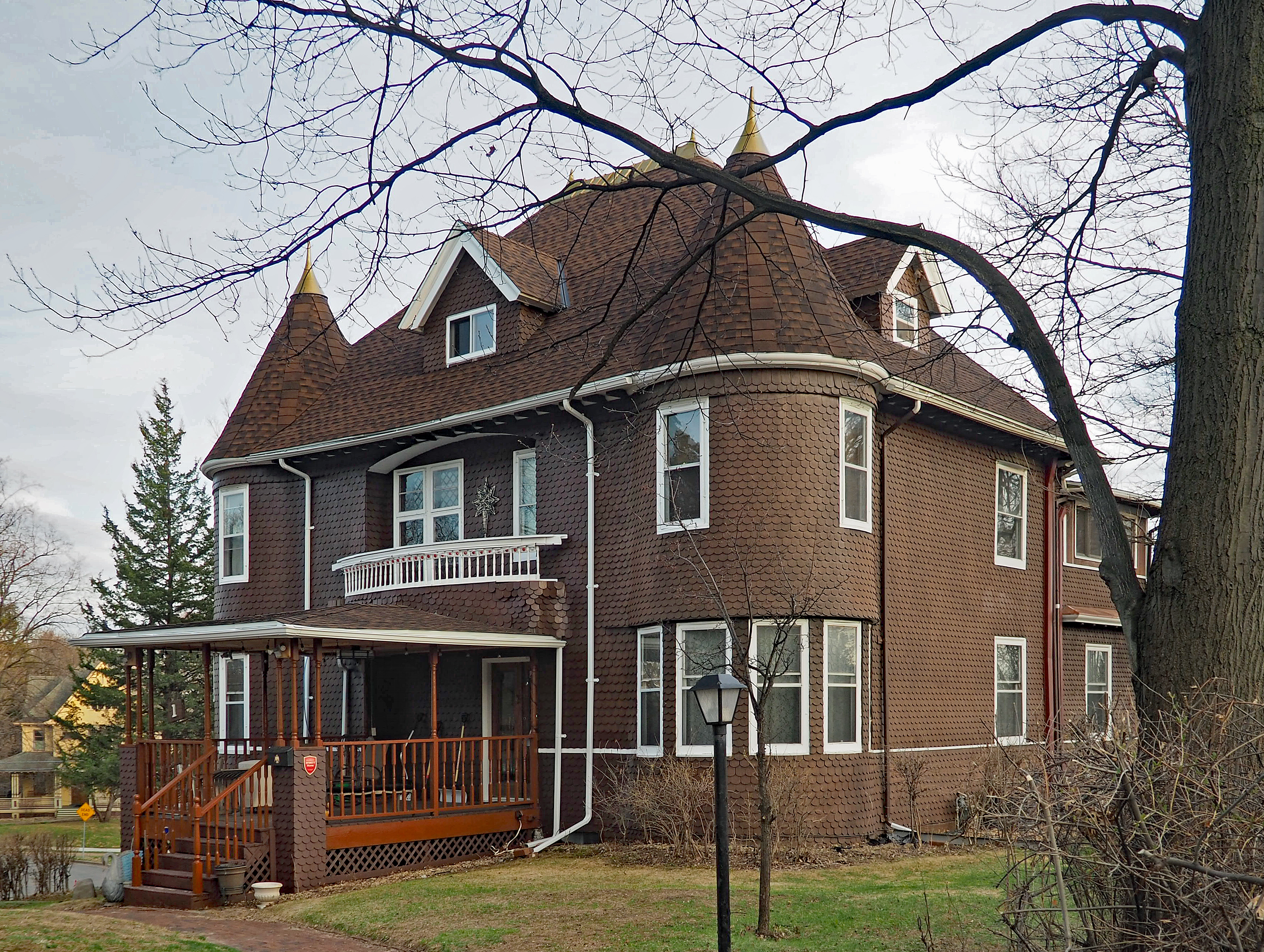
- The Harry Wild Jones House from the northwest

- Location within Minnesota Location within the United States
- Location: 5101 Nicollet Avenue, Minneapolis, Minnesota
- Coordinates: 44°54′37″N 93°16′39″W
- Built: 1887
- Architect: Harry Wild Jones
- Architectural style: Renaissance
- NRHP reference No.: 76001060

Significant dates
- Added to NRHP: June 7, 1976
- Designated MPLSL: 1986

The Harry W. Jones House is a historic house in Minneapolis, Minnesota, United States, in the Tangletown neighborhood. Harry Wild Jones was one of the most notable architects in Minneapolis, with a career spanning nearly 50 years. His designs included the Butler Brothers Warehouse, the chapel in Lakewood Cemetery, and the Washburn Park Water Tower. His own home, built in 1887, was one of the first homes in the Washburn Park area and influenced the design of other homes in the area. The house is listed on the National Register of Historic Places.
