= National Register of Historic Places listings in Martin County, Minnesota =

Location of Martin County in Minnesota

This is a list of the National Register of Historic Places listings in Martin County, Minnesota. It is intended to be a complete list of the properties and districts on the National Register of Historic Places in Martin County, Minnesota, United States. The locations of National Register properties and districts for which the latitude and longitude coordinates are included below, may be seen in an online map.

There are nine properties and districts listed on the National Register in the county. Six of them are in Fairmont, the county seat; the rest are in or near Sherburn.

This National Park Service list is complete through NPS recent listings posted August 1, 2025.

== Current listings ==
	Name on the Register	Image	Date listed	Location	City or town	Description
1	Orville P. and Sarah Chubb House	Orville P. and Sarah Chubb House	May 18, 1995 (#95000616)	209 Lake Ave. 43°39′13″N 94°27′55″W	Fairmont	Fairmont's oldest surviving house, built in 1867; associated with the town's founding and the broader settlement of southern Minnesota by New Englanders. Restored to period condition for tours and events.
2	Fairmont Opera House	Fairmont Opera House	July 2, 1980 (#80004530)	Downtown Plaza and Blue Earth Ave. 43°39′07″N 94°27′43″W	Fairmont	1901 theater, a well-preserved and longstanding venue for cultural and social events.
3	First Church of Christ, Scientist	First Church of Christ, Scientist	May 19, 1988 (#88000594)	222 Blue Earth Ave., E. 43°39′07″N 94°27′35″W	Fairmont	1898 church noted for its Richardsonian Romanesque design by Harry Wild Jones and the unusual emergence of a Christian Science congregation in a small town soon after the movement's founding. Now the Red Rock Center for the Arts.
4	Fox Lake Site	Fox Lake Site	April 8, 1994 (#94000339)	Weber Island in Fox Lake; 43°40′40″N 94°43′12″W	Sherburn vicinity	First prehistoric habitation site in southwest Minnesota excavated by professional archaeologists, and the type site for the region's early Woodland Period phase.
5	Martin County Courthouse	Martin County Courthouse	September 22, 1977 (#77000755)	201 Lake Ave. 43°39′11″N 94°27′54″W	Fairmont	Courthouse built 1906–7, exemplifying the Renaissance/Baroque Revival influence on turn-of-the-20th-century public buildings through its design by architect Charles E. Bell and its interior artwork.
6	Sherburn Commercial Historic District	Sherburn Commercial Historic District	August 3, 1987 (#87001303)	Main St., N., between Front and 2nd Sts. 43°39′13″N 94°43′39″W	Sherburn	Two-block downtown historic district representing turn-of-the-20th-century commercial architecture and Sherburn's emergence as a railroad-based trade center, with 15 buildings constructed 1898–1908.
7	Sherburn Community Building	Sherburn Community Building	October 25, 2021 (#100007072)	116 North Main St. 43°39′14″N 94°43′39″W	Sherburn	1940 municipal theater and meeting hall, Sherburn's first indoor public event venue and only example of Art Deco architecture.
8	United States Post Office	United States Post Office	May 12, 2008 (#08000403)	51–55 Downtown Plaza; 43°39′08″N 94°27′43″W	Fairmont	1926 federal post office that transformed local life by facilitating the shipment of agricultural products and mail-order goods via parcel post, and by anchoring a new business district in Fairmont.
9	George Wohlheter House	George Wohlheter House	June 20, 1975 (#75000994)	320 Woodland Ave. 43°38′48″N 94°28′04″W	Fairmont	Fairmont's most prominent residence, built in 1899 in transitional Queen Anne/Neoclassical architecture.

== See also ==
- List of National Historic Landmarks in Minnesota
- National Register of Historic Places listings in Minnesota
