= First Church of Christ, Scientist, Albion Avenue (Fairmont, Minnesota) =

First Church of Christ, Scientist
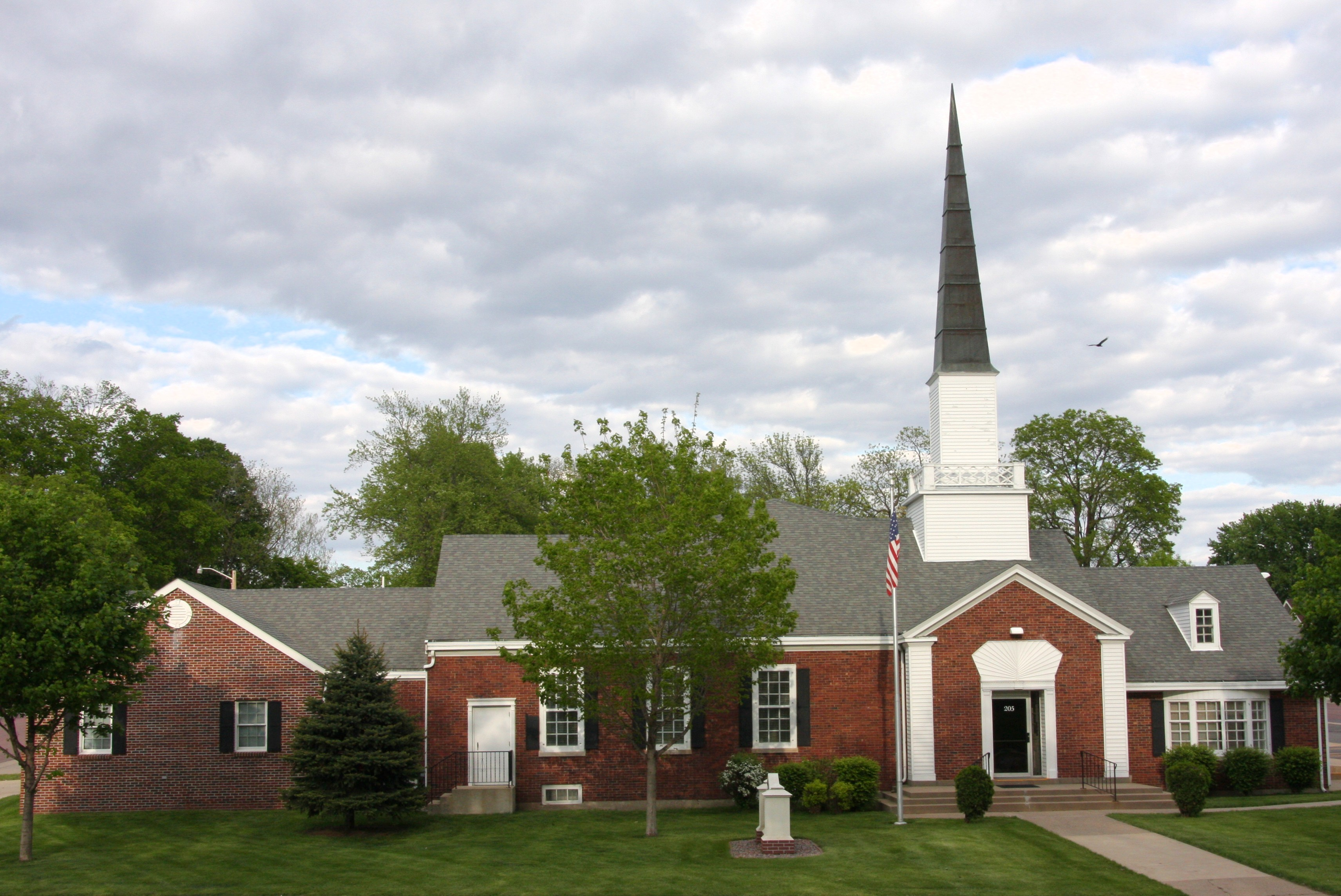
- First Church of Christ, Scientist

First Church of Christ, Scientist, Albion Avenue
- Interactive map of the First Church of Christ, Scientist, Albion Avenue area

General information
- Architectural style: Colonial Revival
- Location: 205 Albion Avenue, Fairmont, Minnesota, United States
- Coordinates: 43°38′57.5″N 94°27′46.5″W
- Completed: 1937

Technical details
- Structural system: redbrick front elevation with steeple; wooden rear elevation

Design and construction
- Architect: Charles Draper Faulkner

The former First Church of Christ, Scientist at 205 Albion Avenue in Fairmont, Minnesota, United States, is a historic Christian Science church building. It was designed in the Colonial Revival style by Chicago architect Charles Draper Faulkner, who was renowned for the churches and other buildings that he designed in the United States and Japan. He designed over 33 Christian Science church buildings and wrote a book called Christian Science Church Edifices, which features this church as well as many others. Built in 1937 to replace the church's previous building at 222 East Blue Earth Avenue, its steepled redbrick front elevation looks west to Wards Park and beyond that to Sisseton Lake. The church is no longer in existence and the building is now the Lakeview Funeral Home.
