= Fourth Church of Christ, Scientist (Milwaukee) =

Church building in Wisconsin, United States

Coordinates: 43°04′27.6″N 87°52′42.9″W

Fourth Church of Christ, Scientist Milwaukee, Wisconsin
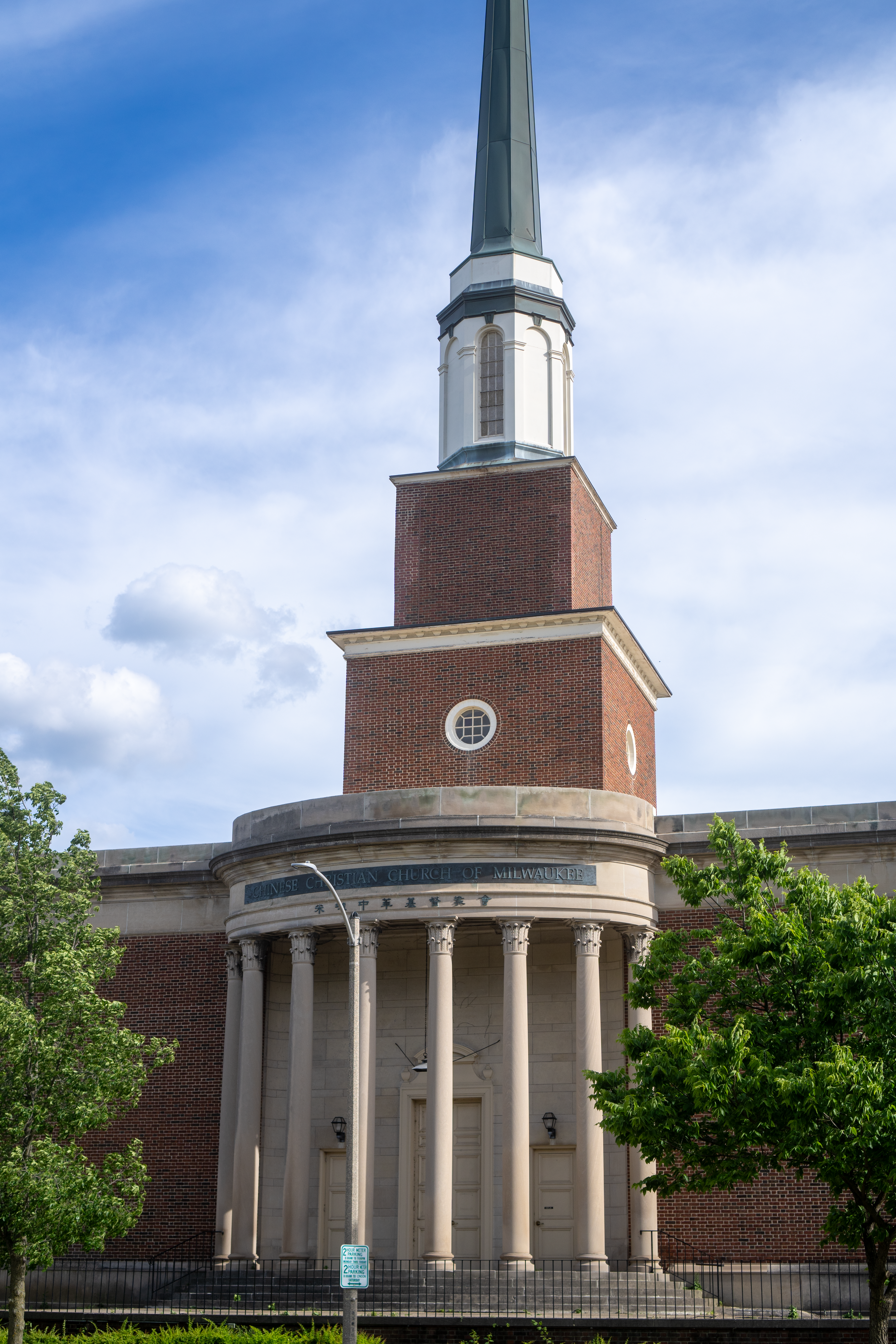

General information
- Architectural style: Georgian Revival
- Location: 3069 North Downer Avenue (aka 2519 E. Kenwood Boulevard) Milwaukee, Wisconsin, United States
- Construction started: 1929
- Completed: 1930

Technical details
- Structural system: concrete with exterior brick covered walls with limestone trim

Design and construction
- Architect: Charles Draper Faulkner

The former Fourth Church of Christ, Scientist, built between 1929 and 1930, is an historic Christian Science church building located at 3069 North Downer Avenue / 2519 E. Kenwood Boulevard) in Milwaukee, Wisconsin. Designed in the Georgian Revival style of architecture by the noted Chicago-based architect Charles Draper Faulkner, the building features a redbrick exterior with Bedford limestone trim. The first services in the completed building were held on June 29, 1930. Sometime after 1996 Fourth Church relocated to 2011 East Capitol Drive in Shorewood, Wisconsin. Today the building is the Chinese Christian Church of Milwaukee (Chinese: 米城中華基督教會)
