= Harry Wild Jones =

American architect

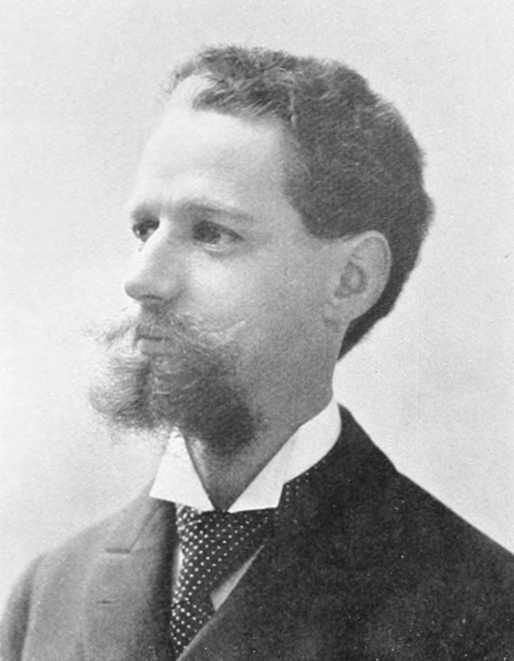
- Born: June 9, 1859; Schoolcraft, Michigan
- Died: September 25, 1935 (aged 76); Minneapolis, Minnesota
- Burial place: Lakewood Cemetery
- Education: Brown University; MIT
- Spouse: Bertha Juliet Tucker (m. 1883)
- Father: Howard Malcom

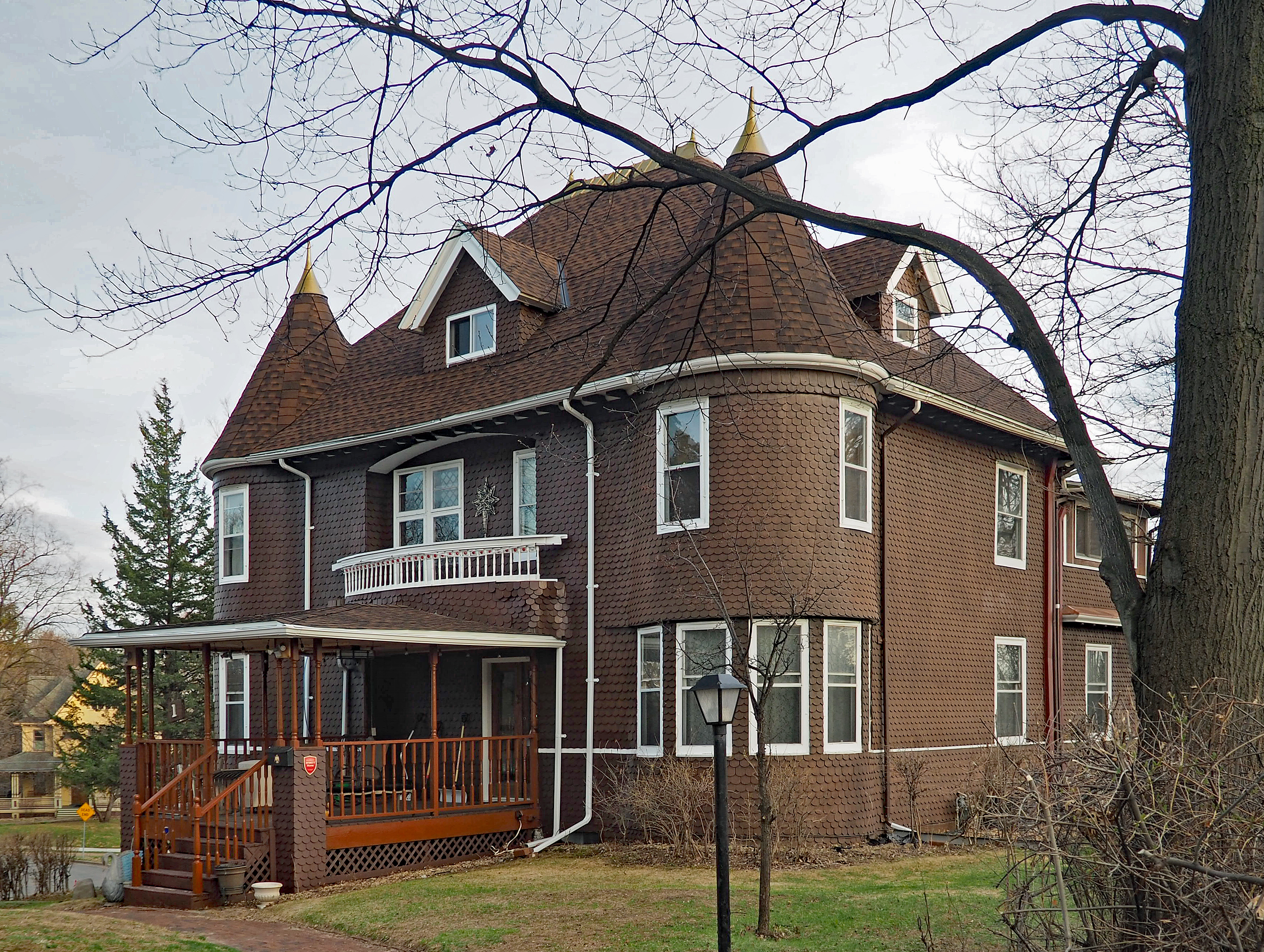
Harry Wild Jones' house on Nicollet Avenue in south Minneapolis

Harry Wild Jones (June 9, 1859 – September 25, 1935) was an American architect based in Minneapolis who designed throughout the country and the world. Born two years before the start of the American Civil War, Jones, a twelfth-generation New Englander, took his place on the American architectural stage in the late 19th century. His life spanned seventy-six years, during a period of U.S. history that matched his exuberant, spirited personality. Known as an architect adept at any design technique, Jones is credited with introducing Shingle Style architecture to Minneapolis.

== Early life ==
Jones was born in Schoolcraft, Michigan, son of the minister to a small Baptist congregation. He was the only child of Reverend Howard Malcom and Mary White Smith Jones. Jones' middle name was chosen as a tribute to his great-great aunt, Rebecca Wild, who lovingly cared for Reverend Jones after the death of his mother when he was a toddler. The Joneses and the Smiths traced their New England roots back to the arrival of the first permanent European settlers to the eastern seaboard. The Joneses are direct descendants of Mayflower passengers William Bradford, John Alden, and Priscilla Mullins. The Smith relations arrived in North America a few years later as the Great Migration from England continued.

With his father's pastorate changing often, by age ten young Harry had lived in Michigan, Wisconsin, Maine, and New York. His family finally settled in the seaside town of Bristol, Rhode Island where he completed his childhood as the only child of the town's only Baptist minister. Jones' secondary education was focused on preparation to enter Brown University in Providence, an institution with strong family ties. In addition to being his father's alma mater, Brown was founded with assistance from Jones' great-great grandfather, Reverend Hezekiah Smith (1737–1805). Reverend Smith, born in New York, showed particular support toward Rhode Island for its advocacy of religious tolerance. During the American Revolutionary War, he provided religious guidance as General George Washington's chaplain. Brown University, a college deeply rooted in religion tolerance, maintained a strong emphasis toward preparing its all male students for a life in the ministry. As the progeny of generations of religious clerics, Jones would have to work hard to show his family his interest in architecture.

In 1878, Jones entered Brown University and remained there for two years. Following his dream to become an architect, he transferred to Massachusetts Institute of Technology (MIT) in 1880, and graduated from the two-year Short Course Architecture Program in 1882. Immediately after graduation, Jones was hired as a draftsman in the Boston architectural firm of Henry Hobson Richardson. Richardson "recognized talent . . . his draftsman were considered the best available."

After a year working for Richardson, Jones, with his bride Bertha Juliet Tucker, moved to Minneapolis, Minnesota, in September 1883. As the newest, and youngest, architect in the Mill City, Jones went to work for architects James C. Plant and William Channing Whitney. When their partnership dissolved the following year, Jones went to Europe to study architecture for six months before founding his own Minneapolis practice in 1885.

== Professional career ==
Jones set up his practice in the newly completed Lumber Exchange Building in downtown Minneapolis, where he remained from 1886 to 1921. His work included designs for commercial, residential, and church customers with a roster of clients including businessmen Emery Mapes (founder of the Cream of Wheat Company), Will Savage (whose name is synonymous with the winning racehorse Dan Patch), meatpacking mogul George A. Hormel, and philanthropist T. B. Walker.

During his work in HH Richardson's office, Jones was introduced to Shingle Style architecture, a design gaining country-wide popularity through Richardson's work and influence on the eastern seaboard. Jones is credited with introducing Shingle Style architecture to Minneapolis soon after he arrived in the area. He is widely admired for his use of shingle coverage in a clubhouse design for the Minnetonka Yacht Club (1890–1943). With its multi-level rooflines resembling full sails on the water, the clubhouse design was said to appear to "possess the same puffy charm of a filling spinnaker sail."

Respected by colleagues for his design versatility, Jones was also masterful at understanding structural engineering. Described as possessing both an artist's eye and engineer's intellect, he set both aptitudes to work in winning combination. Among the four hundred+plus structures Jones designed, from whimsical park buildings to octagonal log houses, and humble church chapels, he is best remembered in Minnesota for the second Lake Harriet Pavilion (1891–1903)—"a Chinese timber-framed pagoda form in a shingle-clad exterior", the monumental Butler Brothers Warehouse (1908)—"a sternly poetic mass of wine-colored brick that conveys the commercial might of Minneapolis at the dawn of the twentieth century", the exquisite Lakewood Cemetery Chapel (1910)—"an elaborate example of Byzantine Mosaic art and one of the finest of its type to be found anywhere in the United States"(NRHP 1983), the Northfield Bank (1910)—whose entire roof structure is designed like spokes around its domed top causing its architect to proclaim at its completion "another building just like it cannot be found in this country", and the Washburn Park Water Tower (1932)—"linking function and artistic splendor with 16-foot medieval knights and eight-foot eagles."

Jones had resolute confidence in his architectural skills, designing not only in the Midwest, but throughout the United States and as far away as Hawaii, China, and Burma. He earned his Asian commissions after a 1907 world cruise, embarked upon to recover following a near fatal car accident that resulted in a skull fracture. Choosing to spend the bulk of his trip in Burma with his missionary cousins, Jones made valuable contacts that led to his future designs for a Moulmein congregation of two thousand, a boys' school dormitory and chapel, a Shanghai college chapel, and a Canton mission building.

In addition to Jones' private practice, in 1890, at one of the busiest periods in his career, he furthered the Midwest's burgeoning profession of structural design by reorganizing the architecture curriculum at the University of Minnesota. Following the introduction of the new classes, he became the school's first formally trained professor.

During that same time, Jones juggled his practice and academic instruction by beginning a twelve-year stint as an elected commissioner for the Minneapolis Park Board. Known as an ardent outdoor enthusiast, Commissioner Harry Jones was dedicated toward naturalism and the preservation of the Mill City's natural beauty. He was well known for his many proposals on behalf of the city's cyclist, even petitioning for a race in 1887. In addition to his civic duties on the Park Board, Jones designed thirteen recreation buildings between 1889 and 1930.

With the onset of the Great Depression in 1929, Jones, though past retirement age, continued to seek commissions to provide for his family's income. In 1932, he began one of his last Minneapolis designs—the water tower built in his Washburn Park neighborhood. Still standing today as a city landmark, the tower was placed on the National Historic Register in 1983.

Harry Wild Jones was married to Bertha Juliet Tucker on September 3, 1883. The service was held in the First Baptist Church of Boston, Massachusetts, (a Henry Hobson Richardson design) and officiated by Reverend Howard Malcom Jones, the groom's father. Jones and Bertha had three children, Howard Malcom (1886–1940), Mary White Smith (1887–1981), and Arthur Leo (1891–1964). Jones died in Minneapolis, on September 25, 1935, at Elmwood, his home in Washburn Park (a neighborhood often referred to as Tangletown). He was buried at Lakewood Cemetery.

== Designs ==
The following buildings and structures were designed by Harry Wild Jones.

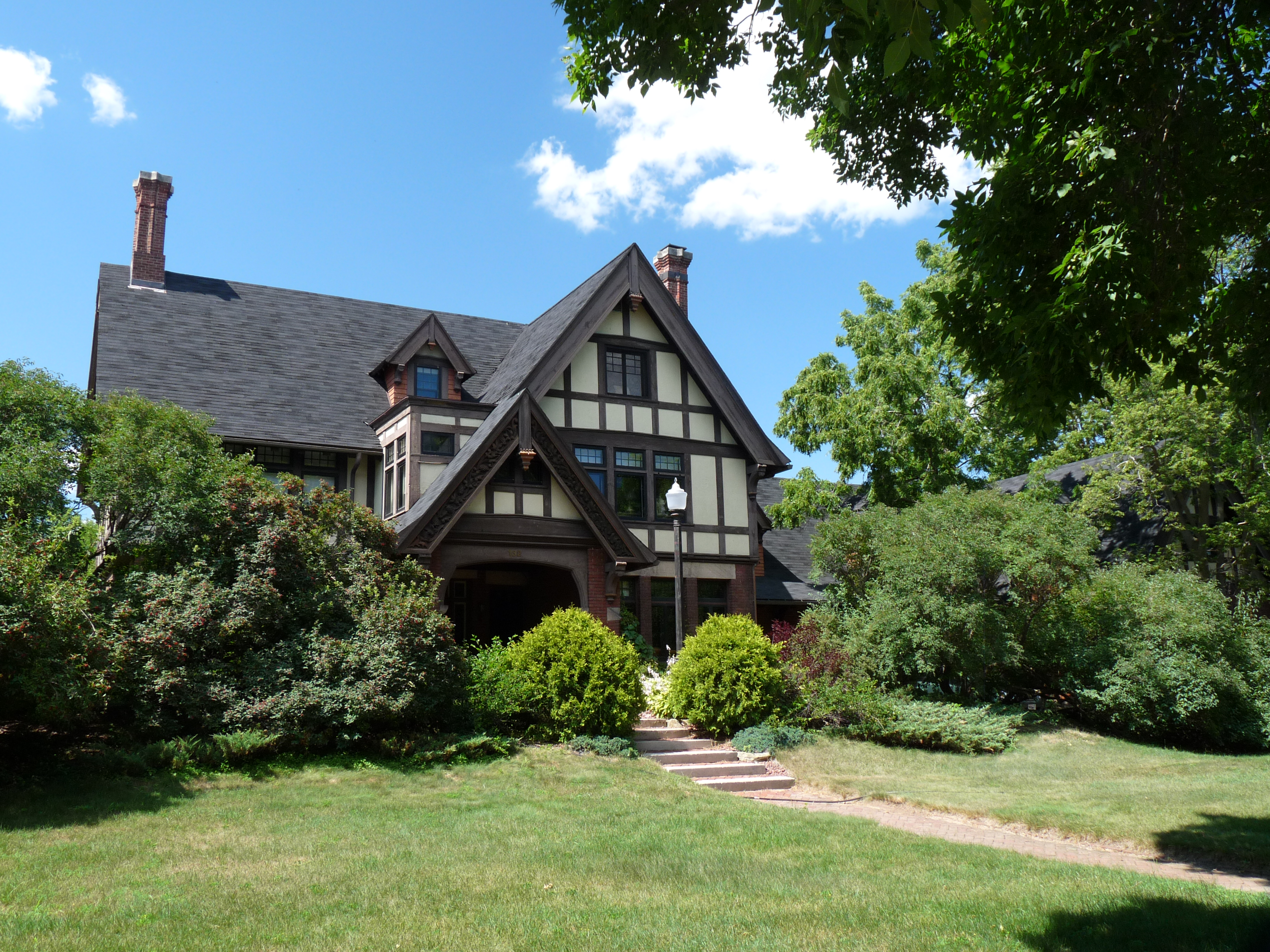
James Barber House, 1904

- Pillsbury Free Library, Warner, New Hampshire (1890–91)
- James Barber House, 132 Marston Avenue, Eau Claire, Wisconsin
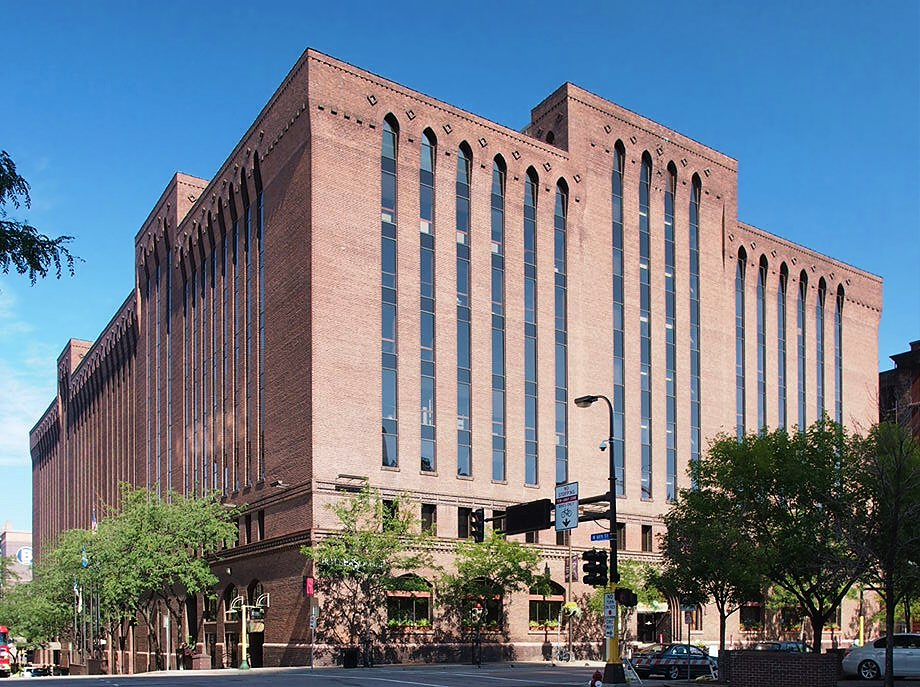
- Butler Brothers Company, 1906
  Butler Brothers Company, 518 First Avenue North, Minneapolis
- Minneapolis Scottish Rite Temple, 2011 Dupont Avenue South, Minneapolis
- Faribault City Hall, 208 First Avenue N.W., Faribault, Minnesota
- First Baptist Church, 201 Third Avenue, Osceola, Wisconsin
- Red Rock Center for the Arts (formerly the First Church of Christ, Scientist), 222 East Blue Earth Avenue, Fairmont, Minnesota
- First Presbyterian Church of Steele, Mitchell Avenue North and First Street, Steele, North Dakota
- Harry W. Jones House, 5101 Nicollet Avenue, Minneapolis
- Lakewood Cemetery Memorial Chapel, 3600 Hennepin Avenue, Minneapolis
- Messiah Lutheran Church, 2500 Columbus Avenue South, Minneapolis
- Mrs. Preston B. Plumb House, 224 E. 6th Avenue, Emporia, Kansas
- Houghtaling House, 1906, Tudor style, 1519 Brook Avenue SE, Minneapolis
- Swinford Townhouses and Apartments, 1213–1221, 1225 Hawthorne Avenue, Minneapolis
- Mr. Paul Henderson's House
- The picnic shelter at Beard's Plaisance, a park on Lake Harriet, Minneapolis
- Washburn Park Water Tower, 401 Prospect Ave, Minneapolis
