= Red Rock Center for the Arts =

Historic church in Minnesota, United States

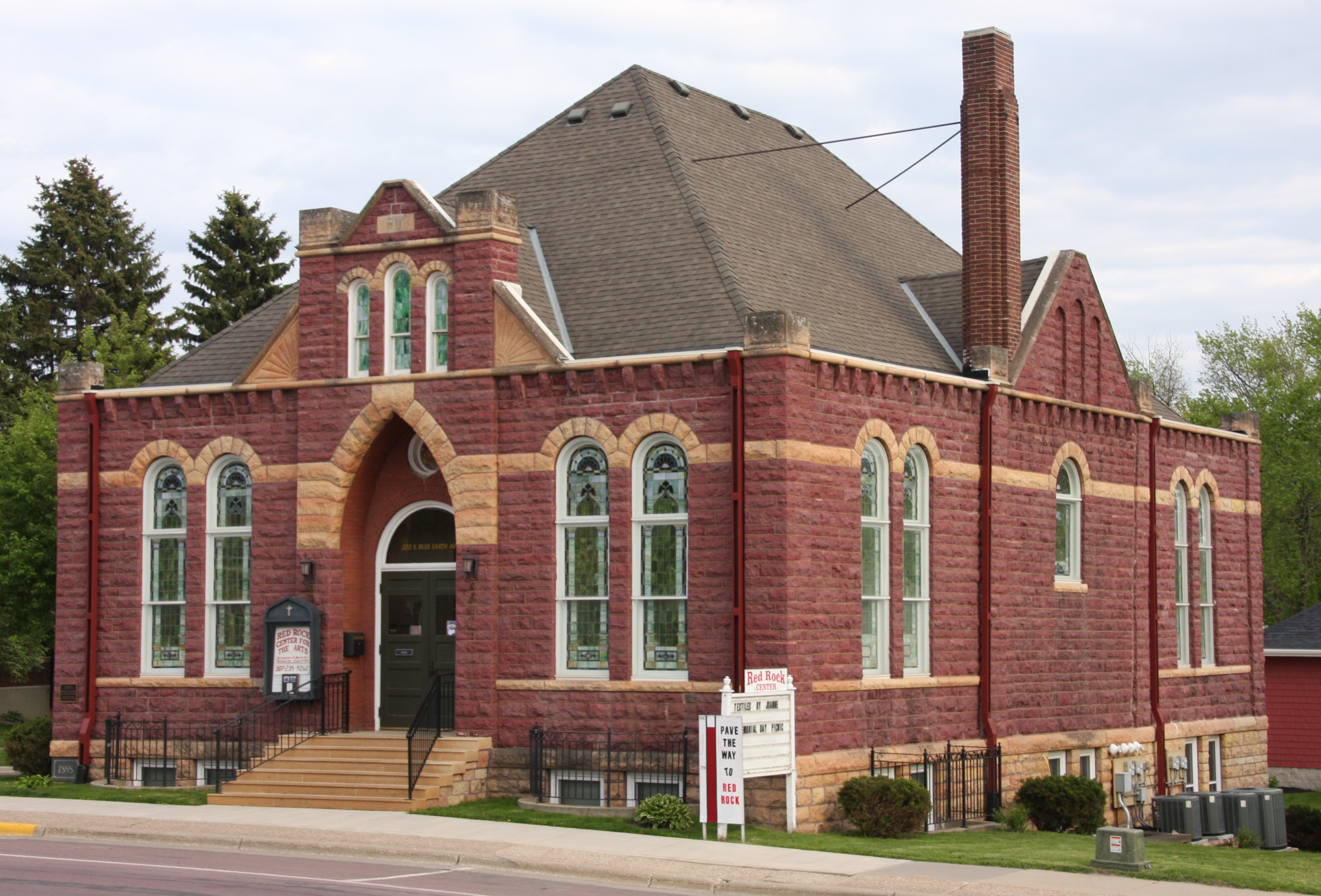

- Location within Minnesota Location within the United States

General information
- Architectural style: Richardsonian Romanesque
- Location: 222 Blue Earth Avenue East, Fairmont, Minnesota
- Coordinates: 43°39′7″N 94°27′34″W
- Completed: 1898

Design and construction
- Architect: Harry Wild Jones
- First Church of Christ, Scientist
- U.S. National Register of Historic Places
- Area: less than one acre
- Built by: Fred Grupe
- NRHP reference No.: 88000594
- Added to NRHP: May 19, 1988

Red Rock Center for the Arts is a historic structure located at 222 East Blue Earth Avenue, in Fairmont, Minnesota, United States. It was added to the National Register of Historic Places on May 18, 1988 as the First Church of Christ, Scientist. It is now owned by Martin County, which leases it to the Martin County Preservation Association.

First Church of Christ, Scientist, Fairmont, was organized October 1, 1891, and the church edifice, designed by noted Minnesota architect, Harry Wild Jones was completed in 1898. Sioux quartzite blocks quarried in Minnesota were used for the walls. The massive blocks are called red rocks because of their color and this gave rise to the present name of the building.

In 1937, First Church sold the building to the Christian Church of Fairmont which sold it in 1988 to a businessman.

First Church of Christ, Scientist, Fairmont, had another church building built at 205 Albion Avenue (between Tilden and Forest streets), which was designed by noted Chicago architect, Charles Draper Faulkner in the Colonial Revival style. That building is now the Lakeview Funeral Home.

First Church of Christ, Scientist, Fairmont, is no longer in existence.

== Preservation ==
The American Association for State and Local History (AASLH) selected the Martin County Preservation Association as one of its 2007 AASLH Award of Merit Winners, for work to preserve, restore and reuse this historic building.

== See also ==
- List of former Christian Science churches, societies and buildings
- National Register of Historic Places listings in Martin County, Minnesota
