= Kidder County Courthouse =

- U.S. National Register of Historic Places
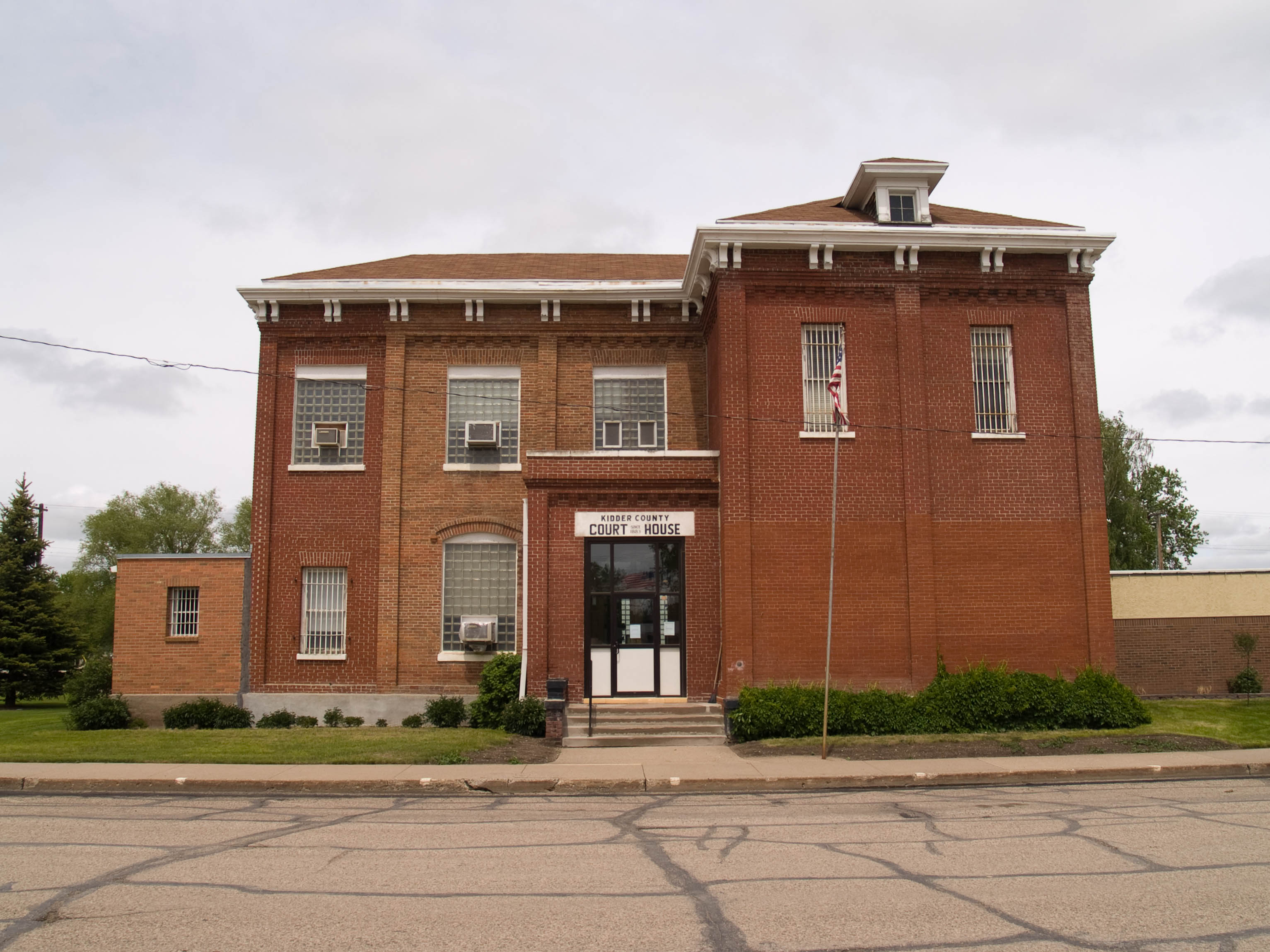
- Kidder County Courthouse in 2008

- Location within North Dakota Location within the United States
- Interactive map of Kidder County Courthouse
- Location: Broadway Ave., Steele, North Dakota
- Coordinates: 46°51′16″N 99°54′53″W
- Area: less than one acre
- Built: 1883
- Architectural style: Italianate
- MPS: North Dakota County Courthouses TR
- NRHP reference No.: 85002985
- Added to NRHP: November 14, 1985

The courthouse c. 1900-1909 from what is now the back entrance.

The Kidder County Courthouse in Steele, North Dakota was built in 1883. It was listed on the National Register of Historic Places in 1985. In 1913, the third story roof was replaced and the entrance was moved.

It is the longest-serving courthouse building in the state. The Stutsman County Courthouse building is older, but is no longer in use as a courthouse.
