= Swinford Townhouses and Apartments =

- U.S. National Register of Historic Places
- Minneapolis Landmark
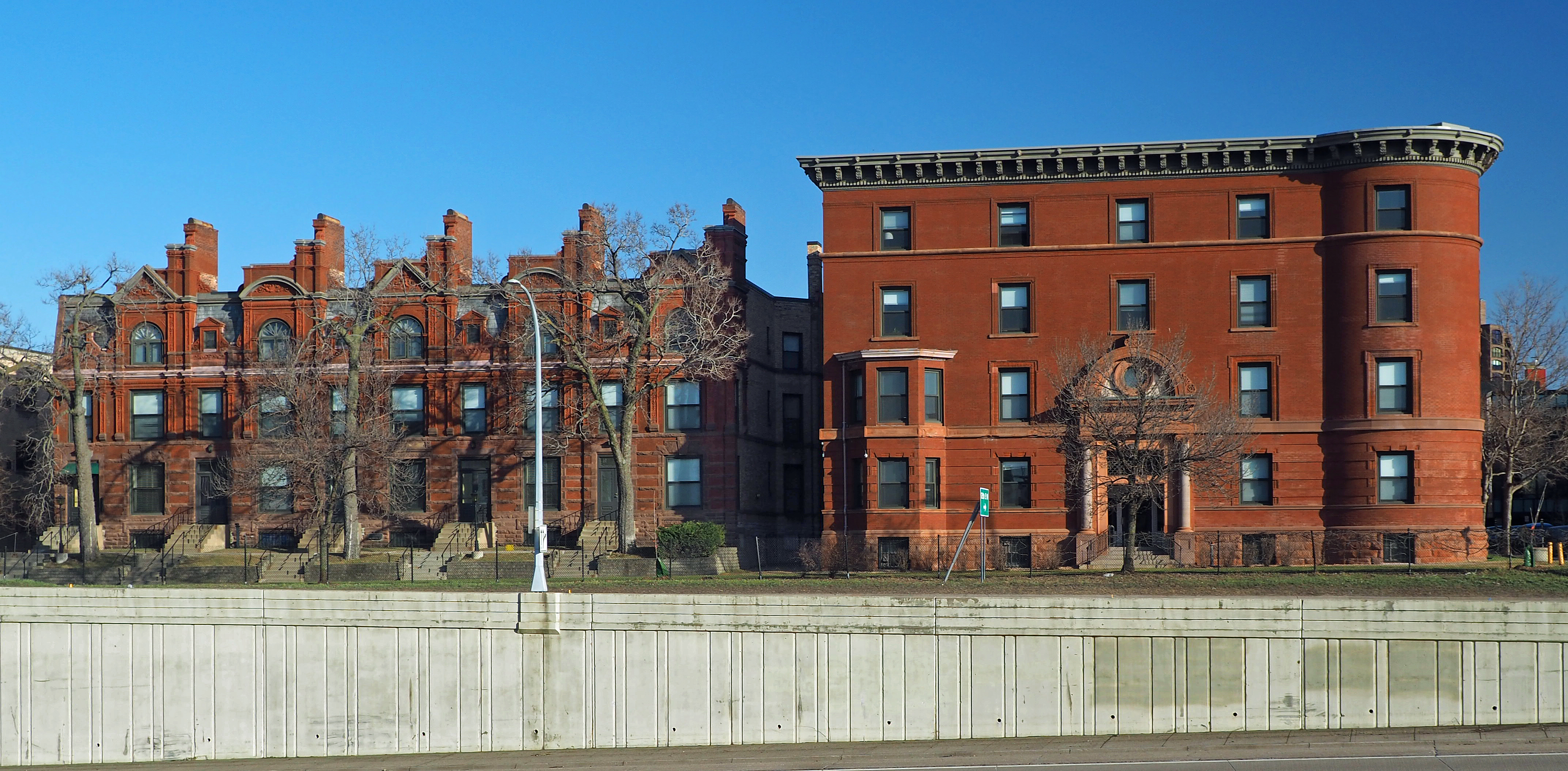
- The Swinford Townhouses and Apartments viewed from the northwest

- Location within Minnesota Location within the United States
- Location: 1213-1221, 1225 Hawthorne Avenue, Minneapolis, Minnesota
- Coordinates: 44°58′31″N 93°16′54″W
- Built: 1886
- Architect: Hodgson & Sons; Harry Wild Jones
- Architectural style: Second Empire; Richardsonian Romanesque
- NRHP reference No.: 90001552

Significant dates
- Added to NRHP: October 25, 1990
- Designated MPLSL: 1980

The Swinford Townhouses and Apartments are a development of townhouses and apartments in the Loring Park neighborhood of Minneapolis, Minnesota, United States. Both buildings are located in an area that surrounded the once-elegant Hawthorne Park. The townhomes were built first, in 1886 by Hodgson & Sons in the Second Empire style, using red brick, stone, and terra cotta. The apartments were designed in 1897 by locally prominent architect Harry Wild Jones, who preferred an eclectic style. The building is four stories tall, built of red brick and stone, and features a corner bay. They were built by Anthony Kelly, a nineteenth-century businessman who pioneered the wholesale grocery business in Minneapolis. Both the townhouses and the apartments were listed on the National Register of Historic Places in 1990. The apartments are now incorporated in the Laurel Village development.
