= Faribault City Hall =

- U.S. National Register of Historic Places
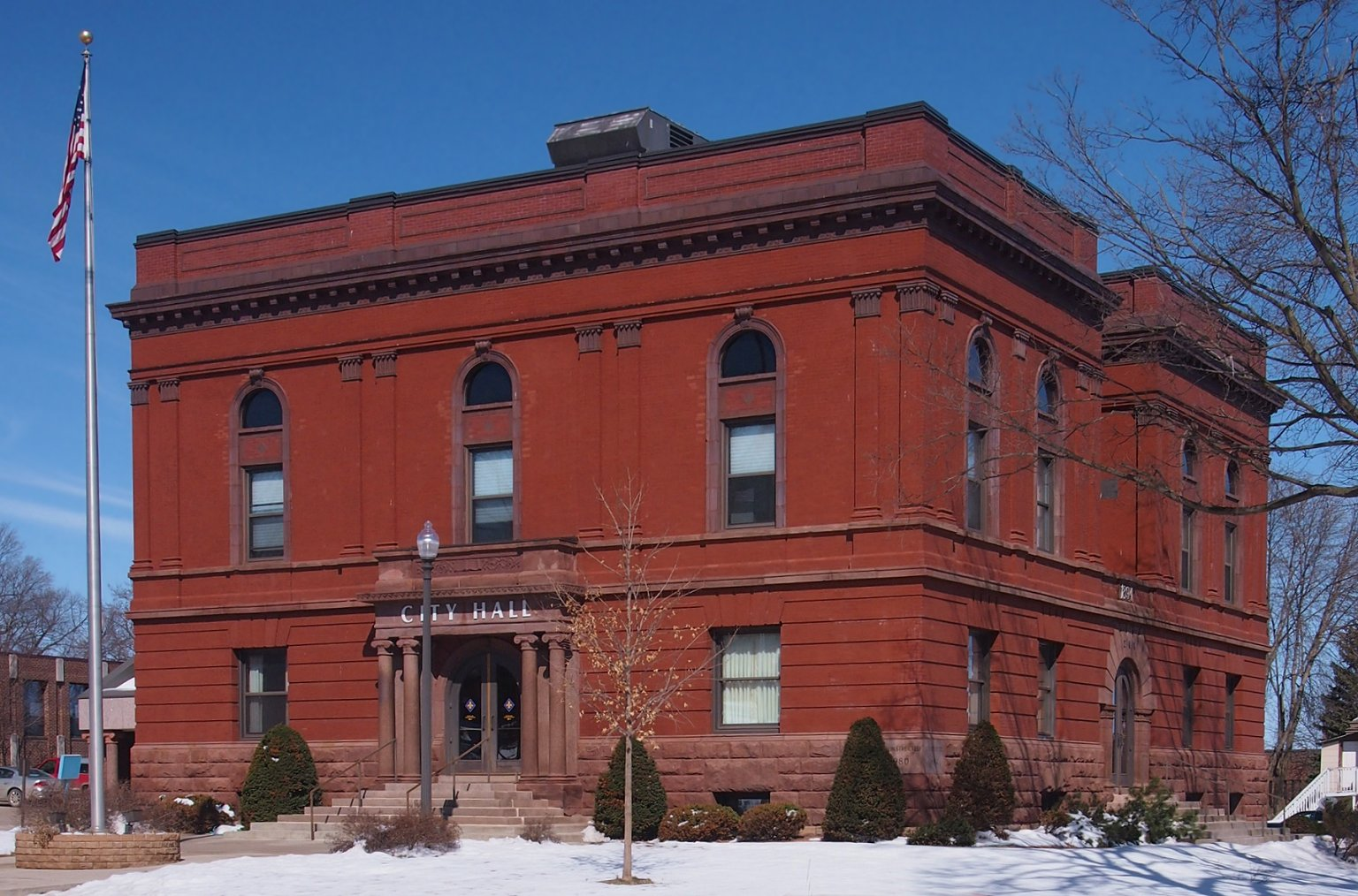
- Faribault City Hall from the southeast

- Location within Minnesota Location within the United States
- Location: 208 1st Avenue NW, Faribault, Minnesota
- Coordinates: 44°17′34″N 93°16′13″W
- Area: Less than one acre
- Built: 1894–97
- Architect: Harry Wild Jones
- Architectural style: Renaissance Revival
- MPS: Rice County MRA
- NRHP reference No.: 82003010
- Added to NRHP: April 6, 1982

Faribault City Hall is the seat of local government for Faribault, Minnesota, United States, in continual service since its completion in 1897. Originally housing a public library as well, Faribault City Hall was listed on the National Register of Historic Places in 1982 for having local significance in the themes of architecture and politics/government. It was nominated for its associations with Faribault's emergence as a regionally important city in the 1890s and a concurrent wave of civic development statewide, and for its Renaissance Revival architecture.

== History and significance ==
Faribault City Hall was designed by architect Harry Wild Jones of Minneapolis in 1894, invoking the Renaissance Revival style then popular for public buildings. The project was a result of increased civic development during the 1890s in Faribault and many other communities throughout Minnesota, when numerous government buildings, libraries, water works, and park systems were established. Locally the same decade was when Faribault first achieved its status as an important manufacturing center in south central Minnesota.

Faribault's public library originally occupied the south half of the building, but moved to the Thomas Scott Buckham Memorial Library in the 1930s.

== See also ==
- List of city and town halls in the United States
- National Register of Historic Places listings in Rice County, Minnesota
