= Orville P. and Sarah Chubb House =

Historic house in Minnesota, United States

- U.S. National Register of Historic Places
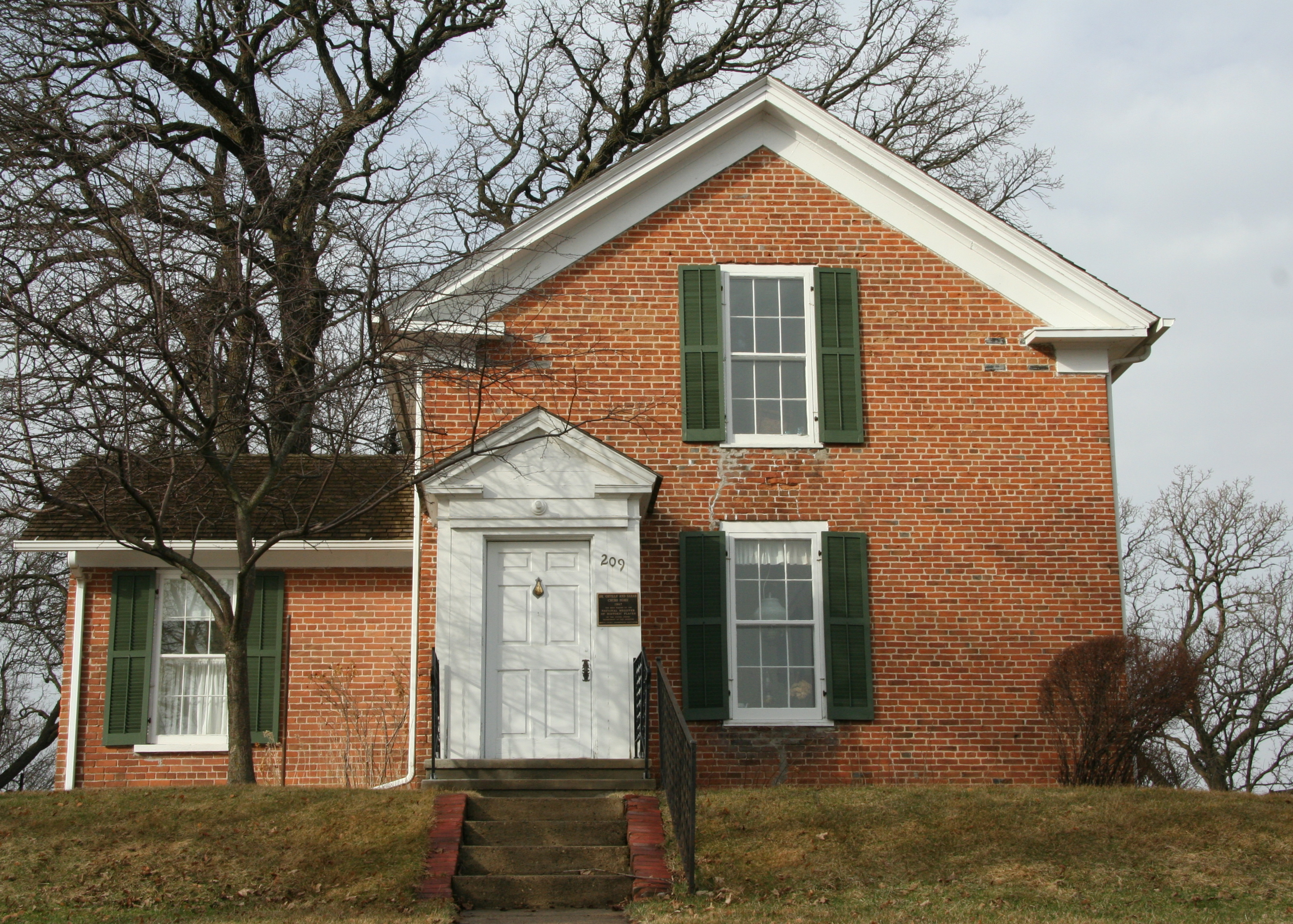
- The Chubb House from the northeast

- Location within Minnesota
- Location: 209 Lake Avenue, Fairmont, Minnesota
- Coordinates: 43°39′13″N 94°27′55″W
- Area: .31 acres (0.13 ha)
- Built: 1867
- Built by: John R. Dalton
- Architectural style: Greek Revival
- NRHP reference No.: 95000616
- Designated: May 18, 1995

The Orville P. and Sarah Chubb House is a historic house in Fairmont, Minnesota, United States. Built in 1867, the Chubb House is the oldest residence standing in Fairmont, and the only surviving house known to have been built with brick from Fairmont's first brickyard. It was the home of prominent homesteader Orville Chubb, who was the community's first physician. The house is an example of a property associated with the early Yankee American development of southern Minnesota town sites. The house was listed on the National Register of Historic Places in 1995 for having local significance in the theme of exploration/settlement. It was nominated for its connections to the founding of Fairmont and for representing the Yankee settlement of southern Minnesota towns.

== Description ==
The house is a Greek Revival design, with brick made from clay quarried near Buffalo Lake. It originally contained three rooms, but another room was added in 1930 and another section was added in 1935. The second floor contains two bedrooms, a small child's room, and a bathroom. The house was acquired in 1992 by the Martin County Preservation Association. It is the oldest brick house still standing in Fairmont.

The Chubb House is one of southwestern Minnesota's few extant examples of the Greek Revival style. The small, 1 1/2-story house was constructed of reddish-brown brick made locally in the first kiln erected at Fairmont. The basement was constructed of large fieldstones and lake boulders held together with mortar. The mortar was scored around each rock on both the inside and outside the foundation.

== History ==
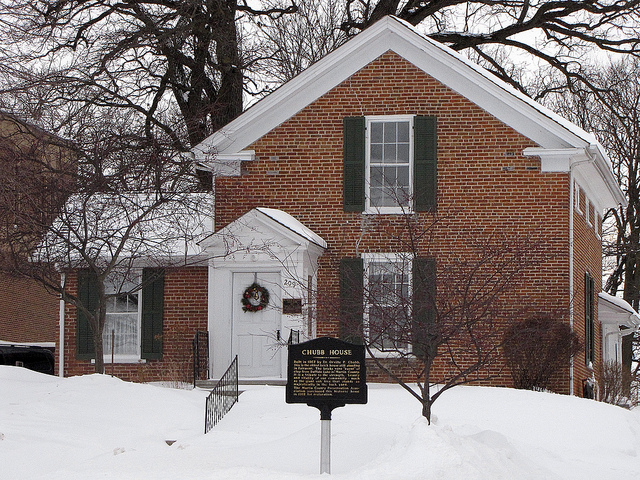
The house in winter

Orville Paterson Chubb was born in Michigan in 1830, attended Cincinnati Medical College, and married Sarah E. Gorton. When the American Civil War started, he enlisted in the Army and served in the Fifth Michigan Regiment in its medical corps. After the war ended, he came to Martin County in fall 1865 to seek land available to retired Civil War soldiers. Representing himself and other officers, he purchased the townsite where Fairmont was eventually plotted. In 1866, Chubb moved to Minnesota with his wife Sarah and daughter Lottie. He and other town founders planned the town of Fairmont and began building homes and businesses.

A few months after their move to Fairmont, in an effort to stimulate the development of the town site, Chubb and fellow Michigan officer Colonel Lounsberry established a brickyard on the southwestern side of Buffalo Lake, about 2 miles (3.2 km) north of the Chubb House. Because the clay was believed to contain too much lime to make durable brick, the brickyard was short-lived. The Chubb House was the first brick house to be built in the county and is the only building still standing which was made from brick from the Chubb-Lounsberry kiln.

The Chubb House was constructed by John R. Dalton, an Irish-born mason who had homesteaded in Martin County in 1866. The house was built at a time when most other structures in the county were log or wood-frame. The house was built on Lake Avenue, just north of Fort Fairmont and just south of the home of Chubb's sister and brother-in-law, Alta Chubb Cadwell and Alpha D. Cadwell. Chubb named the street between the two houses Lottie Street in honor of his daughter.

Dr. Chubb was disillusioned with medical practice after the Civil War, but since there were no other physicians in Fairmont, he practiced medicine until Dr. Winslow Hunt arrived in 1871. Chubb is credited with playing a significant role in the building of the Fairmont community. As co-owner of the town site, he was active in designing its physical layout and drew plans for Fairmont's first cemetery and county fairgrounds. As Fairmont's only physician until 1871, he held a professional and social position that was crucial in the community. Sarah E. Gorton Chubb, who had been born in Michigan in October 1831, was also a leader in the community, although few of her contributions have been recorded. She was an active member of the local Congregational church.

In 1875, the Chubbs left Minnesota, so their daughter Lottie could attend school in Nebraska. They sold their house to George S. Livermore. The Chubbs returned to Fairmont, but in 1880 their daughter died, and in 1882, Sarah died. Dr. Chubb remarried and moved to California. He died in 1894 and is buried in Fairmont.

Under its second owner, George S. Livermore, the Chubb House served as one of the first hotels in the young village of Fairmont. Livermore was also a prominent early merchant who bought livestock and ran a meat market. He became one of Martin County's most-respected and wealthiest citizens. He was still living in the house in 1897 and died in 1904. It was probably Livermore who added the southern addition to the house. The third owner of the house, David Wade, was born in Martin County in 1867 and attended Fairmont schools. He was a leading businessman for sixty-eight years. Wade added a wood-frame rear kitchen extension and a Classical Revival-style entrance to the house.

In 1992, the house was threatened with demolition to make room for a parking lot. The Martin County Preservation Association was formed to save the house. The Association purchased the house for $35,000 and refurbished it.

== See also ==
- National Register of Historic Places listings in Martin County, Minnesota
