= First Baptist Church (Osceola, Wisconsin) =

Historic church in Wisconsin, United States

- U.S. National Register of Historic Places
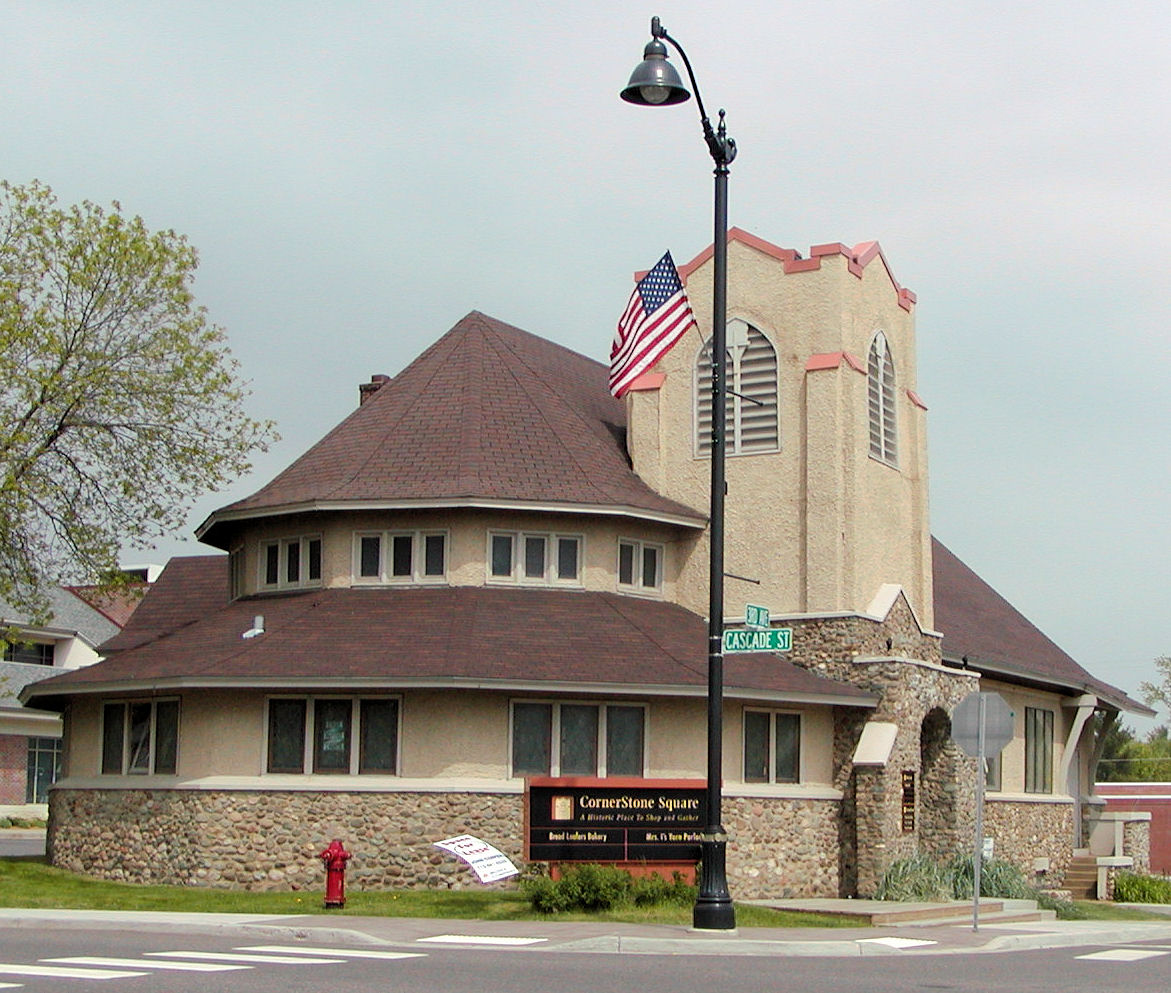
- First Baptist Church
- Location: 201 3rd Ave. Osceola, Wisconsin
- Coordinates: 45.32179°N 92.70504°W
- Built: 1910
- Architect: Harry Wild Jones
- Architectural style: Gothic Revival
- NRHP reference No.: 08000201
- Added to NRHP: March 12, 2008

First Baptist Church was designed by Harry Wild Jones and was built in 1910. It served as a church until 2006. After major restoration following state guidelines, the building was added to the National Register of Historic Places in 2008 for its architectural significance by Glyn and Cindy Thorman, Osceola.

It is described as "Gothic Revival inspired" and as "Craftsman influenced". It is a one-story church on a 40 by 78 feet (12 m × 24 m) plan, with a square bell tower over its main entrance, and with an unusual polygonal rotunda at its west end. The rotunda area provided space for six separable classroom spaces, consistent with Akron Plan design.

This original site of First Baptist Church of Osceola is now owned and operated by River Group Financial, who remodeled the building in the Summer of 2017.

The church, formerly named First Baptist Church of Osceola, moved to a new location in Osceola and changed its name to Grace Church. Grace Church. River Group Financial owns and leases space in the building. One other business (Coffee Bark chocolate) rents production and retail space in the building.
