= Jesse Duke =

American newspaper editor (1853–1916)

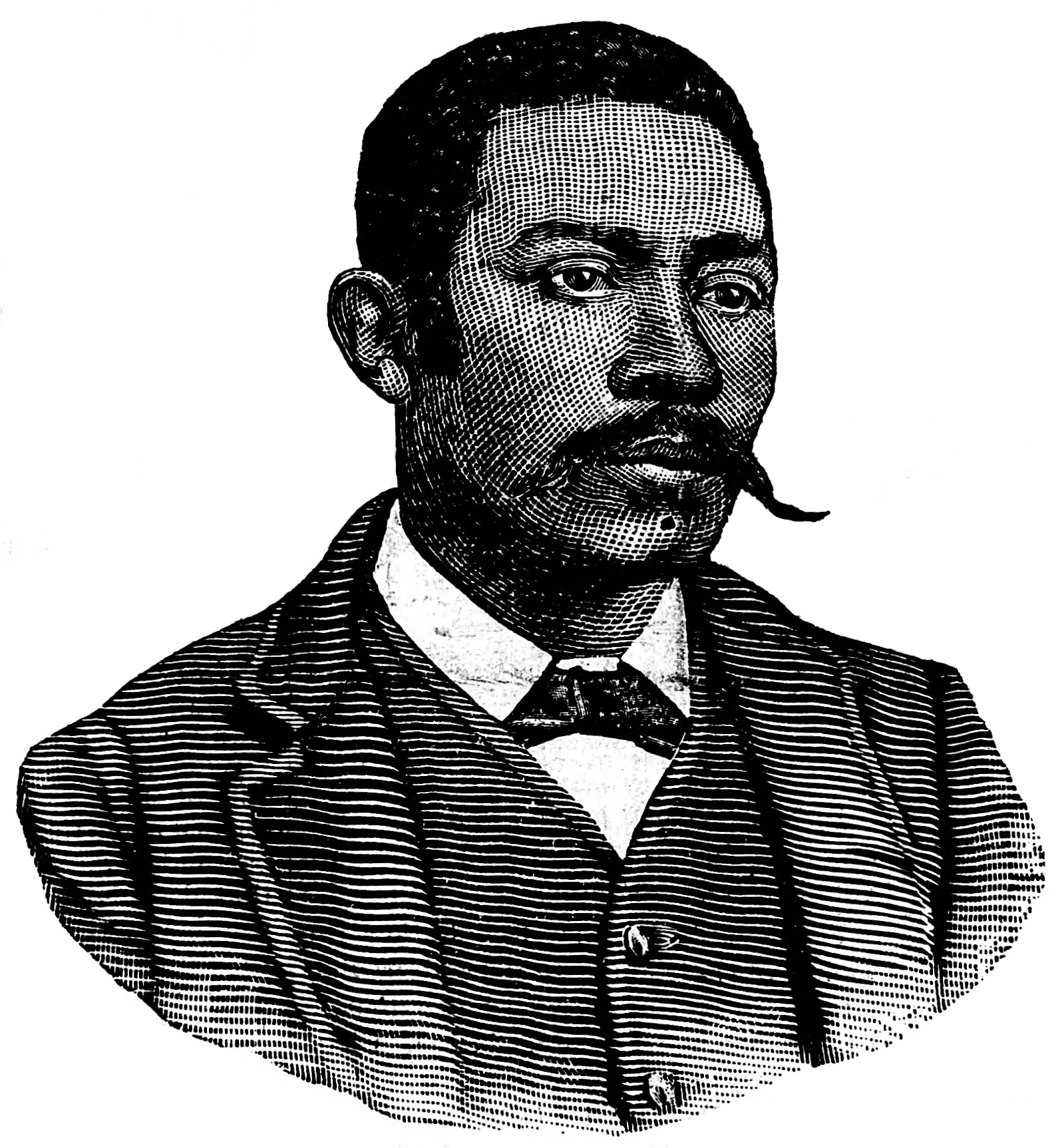
- Born: Jesse Chisholm Duke; March 7, 1853; Cahaba, Alabama, U.S.
- Died: January 23, 1916 (aged 62); Chicago, Illinois, U.S.
- Other names: J. C. Duke
- Occupations: Editor, publisher, activist

Jesse Chisholm Duke (March 7, 1853 – January 23, 1916) was a religious and political leader in Alabama who established and edited the Baptist Montgomery Herald newspaper and served as a Selma University trustee. He advocated for civil rights for African Americans.

== Biography ==
Duke was born into slavery in March 1853 and raised on a plantation near Cahaba, Alabama. At the age of 10 he was hired as a servant to a family of French refugees. The eldest daughter taught school, giving Jesse his first education. In the 1870s he owned a grocery store and was a teacher. He established the Herald in the 1880s. Duke was an influential political leader among Republicans.

He wrote an anti-lynching article that called out white journalists for turning a blind to the children fathered by white men and African American women, drawing a strong reaction that instigated Duke fleeing with his family to Pine Bluff, Arkansas where he started another newspaper. Local whites held a public meeting and condemned him as a vile and dangerous character after he published a statement about the growing appreciation a white "Juliet" could have for a "colored Romeo".

Duke condemned biased all-white juries and the convict labor system it supplied. He corresponded with Booker T. Washington about relocating the Lincoln School in Marion to Montgomery.

He led the Alabama Colored Press Association during its establishment.

Architect and engineer Charles Sumner Duke (1879–1952) was his son.

The Library of Congress has the Montgomery Herald 1886 to 1887 in its collection.
