= First Presbyterian Church of Steele =

Historic church in North Dakota, United States

- U.S. National Register of Historic Places
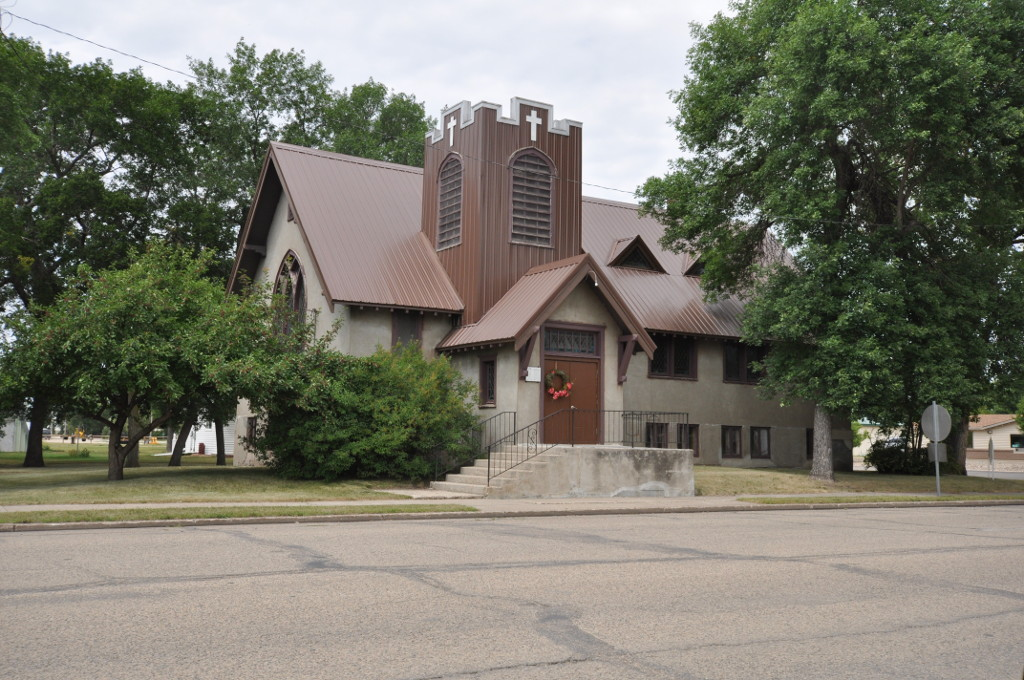

- Location within North Dakota Location within the United States
- Location: Mitchell Ave. N and First St., Steele, North Dakota
- Coordinates: 46°51′17″N 99°54′56″W
- Area: less than one acre
- Built: 1922
- Architect: Harry Wild Jones
- Architectural style: Romanesque
- NRHP reference No.: 04000467
- Added to NRHP: May 19, 2004

First Presbyterian Church of Steele is a historic church at Mitchell Ave. N and First Street in Steele, North Dakota. It was built in 1922 and added to the National Register of Historic Places in 2004.

The congregation's first church had been destroyed by a tornado, and its second church, a brick one, was built in 1887. This was destroyed in a fire on April 1, 1921. It was designed by Minneapolis architect Harry Wild Jones, who was a student of H. H. Richardson, in Richardsonian Romanesque style.

Its NRHP nomination in 2004 noted that the church's exterior stucco, its interior finishes and furnishings, and its "many priceless stained glass windows have been carefully maintained over the years" by the small congregation.
