= James Barber House =

Historic house in Wisconsin, United States

- U.S. National Register of Historic Places
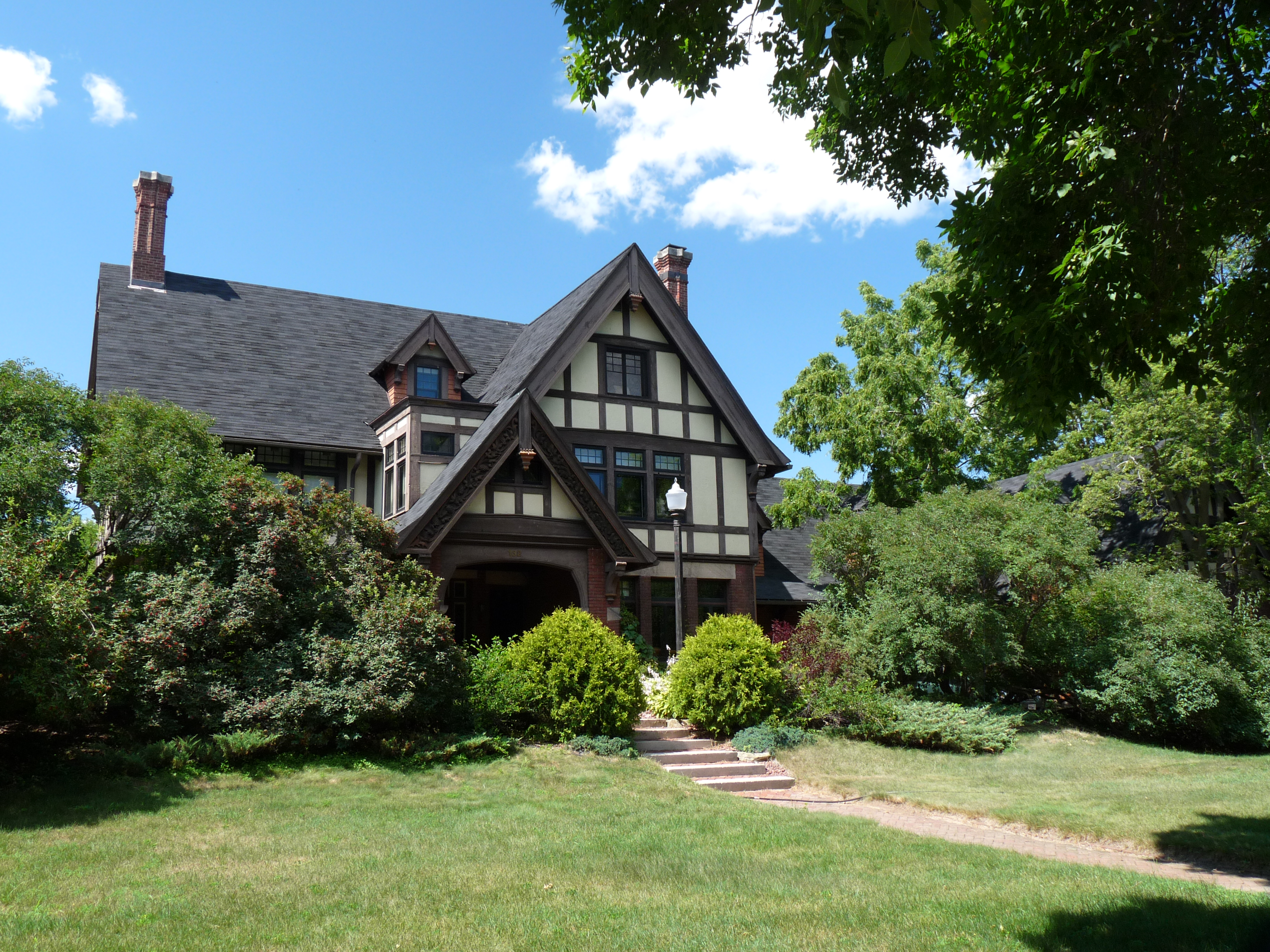
- James Barber House

- Location within Wisconsin Location within the United States
- Location: 132 Marston Ave., Eau Claire, Wisconsin
- Coordinates: 44°48′15″N 91°29′45″W
- Area: 1 acre (0.40 ha)
- Built: 1904
- Architect: Harry Wild Jones
- Architectural style: Tudor Revival
- MPS: Eau Claire MRA
- NRHP reference No.: 83003374
- Added to NRHP: January 28, 1983

The James Barber House is located in Eau Claire, Wisconsin.

== History ==
James Barber was a prominent figure in the lumber and railroad industries. The house was listed on the National Register of Historic Places in 1983 and on the State Register of Historic Places in 1989.
