= Charles Sumner Duke =

American architect, engineer and public official

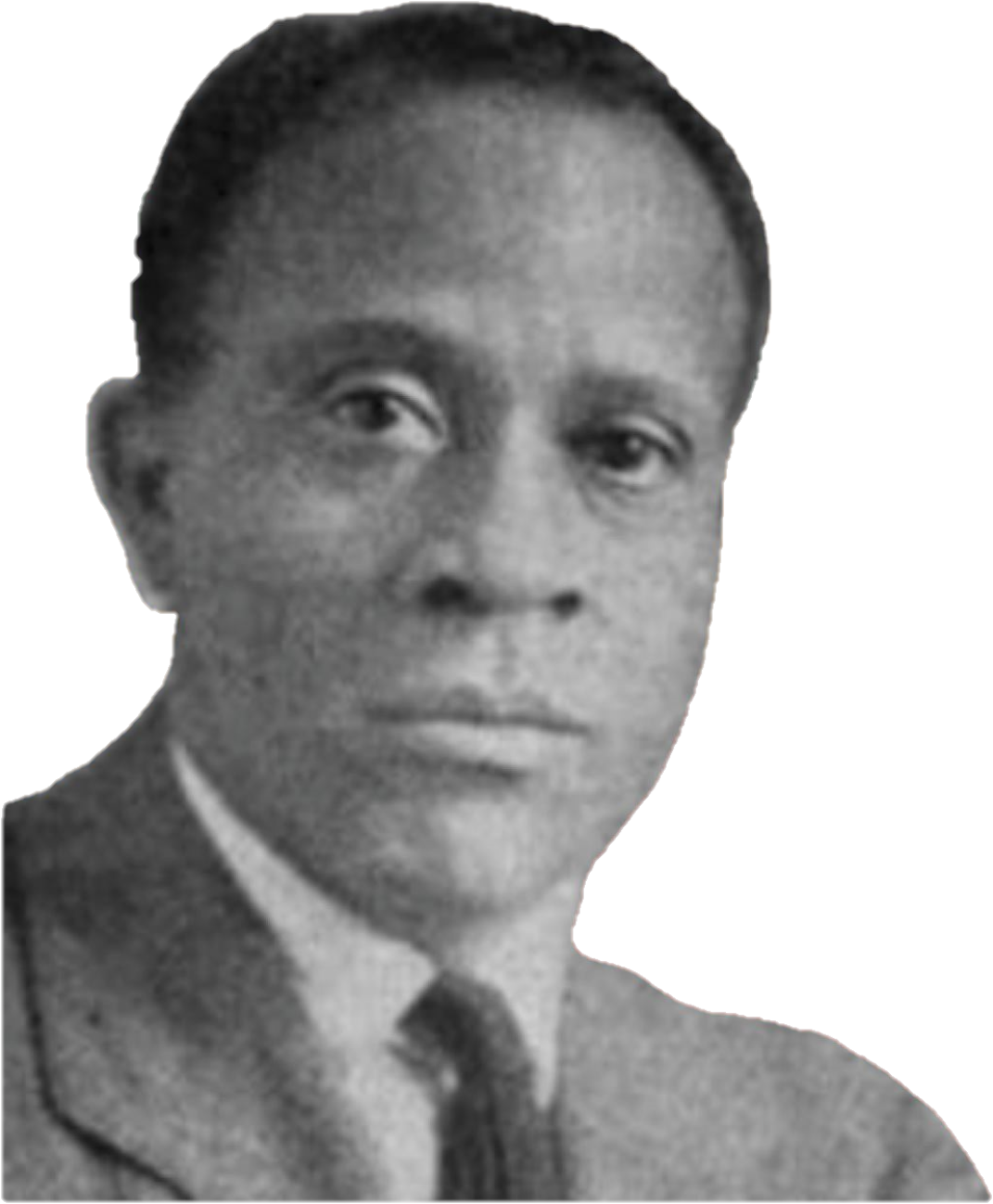
- A photograph of Mr. Duke.
- Born: July 21, 1879; Selma, Alabama
- Died: June 15, 1952 (aged 72)
- Education: Harvard University; University of Wisconsin
- Father: Jesse Duke

Charles Sumner Duke (July 21, 1879 – June 15, 1952) was an architect, engineer, and public official who advocated for opportunities for African Americans and helped found the National Technical Association (NTA) in 1925. His father was newspaperman and civil rights leader Jesse Duke.

== Early life and education ==
Duke was born in Selma, Alabama. His father, Jesse Duke, was a newspaper publisher whose anti-lynching editorial elicited a response that caused the family to flee to Pine Bluff, Arkansas.

Duke studied at Branch Normal College, the Art Institute of Chicago, Phillips Exeter Academy, and graduated from Harvard University and the University of Wisconsin.

== Career and military service ==
He moved to Chicago in 1908. He was hired by the city of Chicago's Department of Public Works, Bureau of Engineering, in 1914, as a construction engineer. In 1916, Duke joined the U.S. Army, serving on the Mexican border with the Engineer Corps. He left with an honorable discharge and the rank of first lieutenant. He later went to work for Chicago's Bridge Division, and headed the city's Zoning Commission. As an architect, Duke helped with the initial construction of the Ida B. Wells project in Chicago, Illinois, and the design of the Newport News Homestead. In 1938, Duke accepted a position for the U.S. government to lead construction in the U.S. Virgin Islands.

He founded the National Technical Association (NTA) in 1925 and served as its first president. In 1932, Duke and the NTA advocated against the closure of Howard University's School of Engineering.

Duke died from complications related to a blood clot after surgery for cancer. The NTA's Charles S. Duke Distinguished Lecture Series is named for him.
