= Washburn Park Water Tower =

Historic water tower in Minneapolis

- U.S. National Register of Historic Places
- Minneapolis Landmark
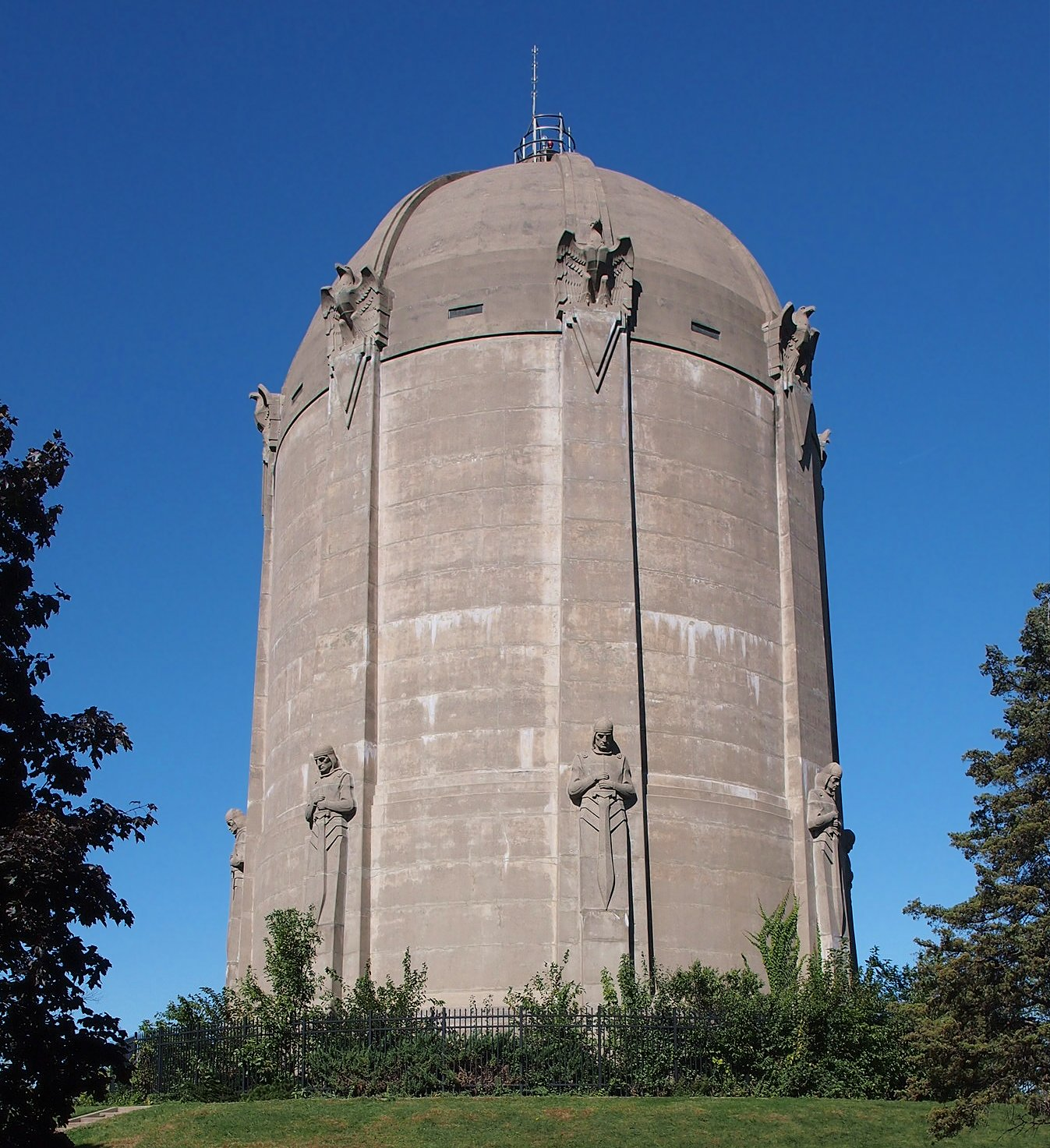
- The Washburn Park Water Tower in 2015, viewed from the southeast
- Location: Minneapolis, Minnesota
- Coordinates: 44°54′38.76″N 93°17′2.45″W
- Built: 1931
- Architect: Harry W. Jones
- Engineer: William S. Hewett
- NRHP reference No.: 83003663

Significant dates
- Added to NRHP: October 6, 1983
- Designated MPLSL: 1980

The Washburn Park Water Tower is a landmark in the Tangletown neighborhood of south Minneapolis, Minnesota, built in 1931. It is located on top of one of the highest points of south Minneapolis. The tower is considered an unofficial "beacon" for incoming planes landing at Minneapolis-Saint Paul International Airport; however, it is not as visible to passers-by at the base of the hill due to the large homes and tall oak trees scattered on the hillside.

The Washburn Park Water Tower is one of three stone water towers built in Minneapolis during the early 20th century. The other two are Kenwood Park Water Tower in Kenwood and Prospect Park Water Tower in Prospect Park.

== History ==
The original tower was built in 1893 by Cadwallader and William Washburn to supply water for the Memorial Orphan Asylum. Water was pumped from the Minnehaha Creek to the tower and then piped to the orphanage. The tower was purchased by the city of Minneapolis and connected to the city water supply in 1915. The current 110-foot-high water tower was built in 1931 by the City of Minneapolis in an Art Deco style.

The tower was one of the last projects of Harry Wild Jones, an architect known for several other Minneapolis landmarks including Butler Square and Lakewood Cemetery Chapel. It was intended to add beauty to the developing neighborhood and to create jobs during the Great Depression. Along with William S. Hewett (an engineer from the Interlachen Bridge project), he incorporated modern hydro-engineering methods into the tower's design. The story goes that as Jones was clearing underbrush at his home nearby, which was also in its construction phase, a giant eagle (with nearly an 8-foot (2.4 m) wingspan) had attacked him. He had the eagle maimed, captured, and brought to town where it began attracting much attention. In part, he used the eagle's extraordinary dimensions (and the artistic skills of John Karl Daniels) to cast the eight concrete lookalikes which now sit atop the tower, watching over their former domain. Eight 18-foot-tall (5.5 m) "Guardians of Health" were also placed around the tower to prevent any bad-tasting or bad-smelling water pollutants, which were thought to be the cause of typhoid fever outbreaks, from contaminating the water supply.

The tower is close to Jones' residence. It stands out due to its distinctive castle-like architecture despite being partially hidden by new homes and trees.

In 1968, a malfunction at a nearby pumping station caused the tower to overflow, flooding the basements of many of the surrounding houses.

On October 6, 1983, the water tower was placed on the National Register of Historic Places for the city of Minneapolis. The water tower's record number is #24362.

The tower no longer supplies water to the surrounding neighborhoods. Instead, it is drained in the fall and filled in the spring to provide a local head for water pressure throughout south Minneapolis during the summer.

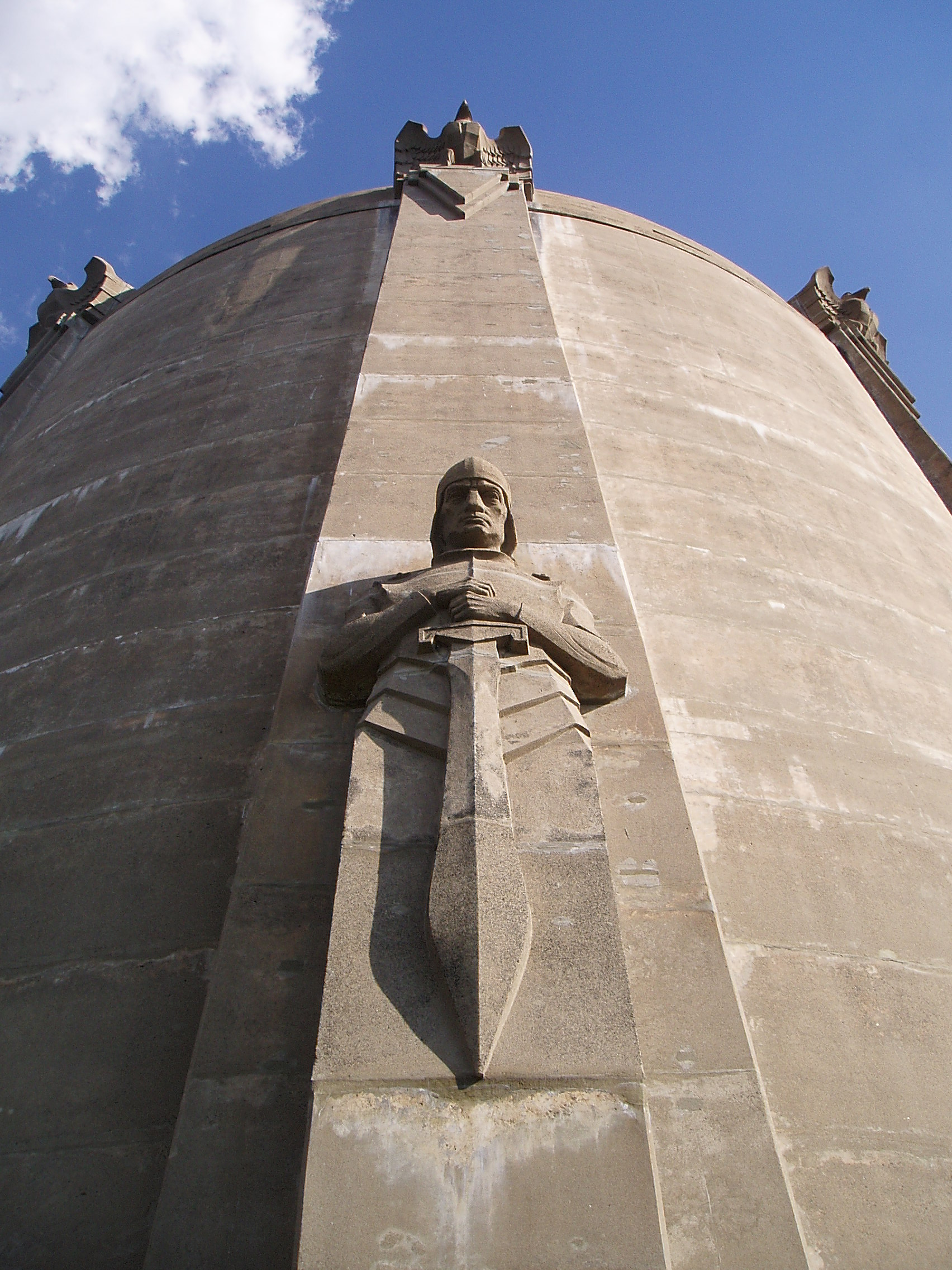
There are eight "Guardians of Health" and eagle sculptures that encircle the water tower.
