= Steele, North Dakota =

- City
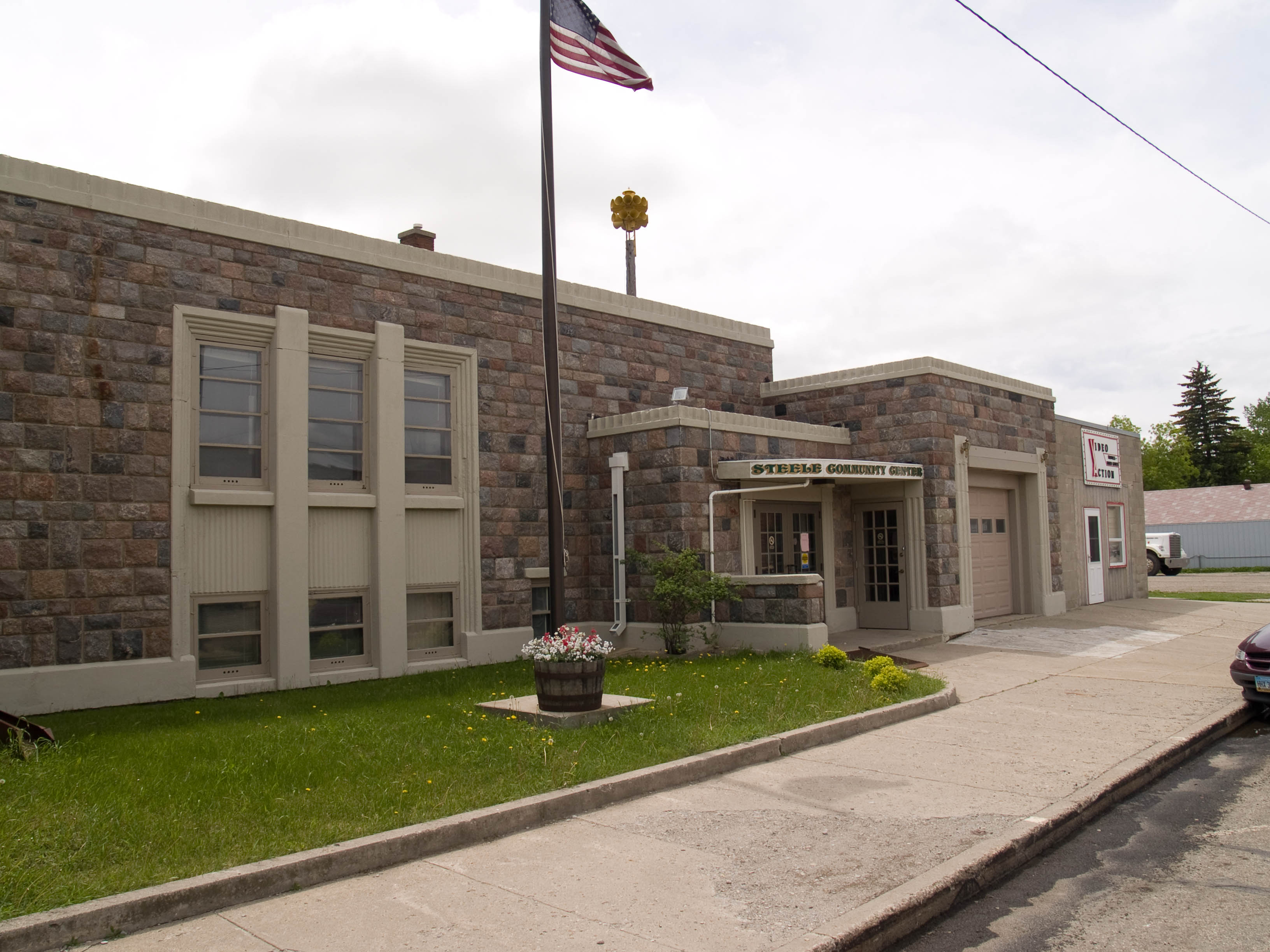
- Steele Community Center in Steele

- Location of Steele, North Dakota
- Coordinates: 46°51′24″N 99°55′05″W
- Country: United States
- State: North Dakota
- County: Kidder
- Platted: 1878
- Founded: 1880

Government
  - Mayor: Jonathan Harter

Area
  - Total: 0.56 sq mi (1.44 km^{2})
  - Land: 0.56 sq mi (1.44 km^{2})
  - Water: 0 sq mi (0.00 km^{2})
- Elevation: 1,864 ft (568 m)

Population (2020)
  - Total: 665
  - Estimate (2022): 666
  - Density: 1,197.5/sq mi (462.36/km^{2})
- Time zone: UTC-6 (Central (CST))
  - Summer (DST): UTC-5 (CDT)
- ZIP code: 58482
- Area code: 701
- FIPS code: 38-75780
- GNIS feature ID: 1036287
- Website: steelend.com

Steele is a city in and the county seat of Kidder County, North Dakota, United States. The population was 665 at the 2020 census. Steele is approximately 41 miles east of Bismarck, 60 miles west of Jamestown, and 154 miles west of Fargo.

== History ==
Steele was platted in 1878 by Wilbur F. Steele, and named for him. The community got its start soon after the railroad was extended to that point. A post office has been in operation at Steele since 1880. The Kidder County Courthouse was built in 1883.

The high temperature was 121 degrees Fahrenheit in Steele, N.D. on July 6, 1936.

== Geography ==
According to the United States Census Bureau, the city has a total area of 0.57 square miles (1.48 km^{2}), all land.

== Climate ==
On July 6, 1936, the temperature in Steele soared to 121 °F (49.4 °C), the highest temperature ever recorded in the state of North Dakota. This event, during the 1936 North American heat wave, is even more remarkable because since 1948, the temperature has not exceeded 109 °F (42.8 °C). It was the highest temperature recorded so far north on the North American continent until June 29, 2021, when it was exceeded in Lytton, British Columbia by 0.3 °F (0.2 °C). A prolonged period of extreme drought across the entire Great Plains contributed to the extreme heat. Record high temperatures for 15 states fell that summer. In the United States, higher temperatures have been recorded in only four states: California, Arizona, Nevada, and New Mexico. (Kansas set its own 121 °F record on July 24.)

According to the averages, Steele has a humid continental climate (Dfb) with warm to hot summers and very cold winters, typical of the Great Plains. Though summer's highs average 83 °F (28.3 °C) there are still 17–18 days on average of above 90 °F (32.2 °C). January nights average 2 °F (−16.7 °C), and subzero temperatures happen on multiple occasions every winter.

Climate data for Steele, North Dakota (1991–2020 normals, extremes 1894–present)
Month	Jan	Feb	Mar	Apr	May	Jun	Jul	Aug	Sep	Oct	Nov	Dec	Year
Record high °F (°C)	55 (13)	64 (18)	80 (27)	95 (35)	110 (43)	109 (43)	121 (49)	106 (41)	105 (41)	95 (35)	76 (24)	67 (19)	121 (49)
Mean daily maximum °F (°C)	20.5 (−6.4)	24.9 (−3.9)	38.0 (3.3)	54.5 (12.5)	67.3 (19.6)	75.8 (24.3)	81.8 (27.7)	81.2 (27.3)	72.0 (22.2)	56.1 (13.4)	38.8 (3.8)	25.0 (−3.9)	53.0 (11.7)
Daily mean °F (°C)	10.9 (−11.7)	15.2 (−9.3)	27.7 (−2.4)	41.9 (5.5)	54.3 (12.4)	63.9 (17.7)	69.4 (20.8)	67.8 (19.9)	58.8 (14.9)	44.3 (6.8)	28.8 (−1.8)	16.3 (−8.7)	41.6 (5.3)
Mean daily minimum °F (°C)	1.4 (−17.0)	5.5 (−14.7)	17.5 (−8.1)	29.4 (−1.4)	41.4 (5.2)	52.0 (11.1)	56.9 (13.8)	54.5 (12.5)	45.6 (7.6)	32.4 (0.2)	18.9 (−7.3)	7.5 (−13.6)	30.2 (−1.0)
Record low °F (°C)	−44 (−42)	−50 (−46)	−35 (−37)	−7 (−22)	11 (−12)	26 (−3)	32 (0)	26 (−3)	10 (−12)	−12 (−24)	−25 (−32)	−42 (−41)	−50 (−46)
Average precipitation inches (mm)	0.63 (16)	0.61 (15)	0.95 (24)	1.41 (36)	2.81 (71)	3.43 (87)	3.36 (85)	2.57 (65)	2.12 (54)	1.81 (46)	0.86 (22)	0.80 (20)	21.36 (543)
Average snowfall inches (cm)	8.5 (22)	5.6 (14)	7.9 (20)	2.0 (5.1)	0.1 (0.25)	0.0 (0.0)	0.0 (0.0)	0.0 (0.0)	0.0 (0.0)	0.8 (2.0)	6.2 (16)	9.0 (23)	40.1 (102)
Average precipitation days (≥ 0.01 in)	5.5	4.6	5.1	7.1	10.4	11.1	9.9	7.5	7.3	6.9	5.4	5.7	86.5
Average snowy days (≥ 0.1 in)	4.9	3.3	2.9	1.0	0.1	0.0	0.0	0.0	0.0	0.8	2.3	4.4	19.7
Source: NOAA (snow 1981–2010)

== Demographics ==
Historical population
Census	Pop.	Note	%±
1890	133		—
1900	185		39.1%
1910	500		170.3%
1920	550		10.0%
1930	519		−5.6%
1940	721		38.9%
1950	762		5.7%
1960	847		11.2%
1970	696		−17.8%
1980	796		14.4%
1990	762		−4.3%
2000	761		−0.1%
2010	715		−6.0%
2020	665		−7.0%
2022 (est.)	666		0.2%
U.S. Decennial Census; 2020 Census

=== 2010 census ===
As of the census of 2010, there were 715 people, 316 households, and 194 families residing in the city. The population density was 1,254.4 inhabitants per square mile (484.3/km^{2}). There were 362 housing units at an average density of 635.1 per square mile (245.2/km^{2}). The racial makeup of the city was 95.9% White, 0.7% African American, 0.3% Native American, 2.1% Asian, 0.7% from other races, and 0.3% from two or more races. Hispanic or Latino of any race were 1.5% of the population.

There were 316 households, of which 27.5% had children under the age of 18 living with them, 47.8% were married couples living together, 7.9% had a female householder with no husband present, 5.7% had a male householder with no wife present, and 38.6% were non-families. 35.4% of all households were made up of individuals, and 19.3% had someone living alone who was 65 years of age or older. The average household size was 2.26 and the average family size was 2.89.

The median age in the city was 41.9 years. 25.5% of residents were under the age of 18; 6.2% were between the ages of 18 and 24; 21.6% were from 25 to 44; 25.5% were from 45 to 64; and 21.4% were 65 years of age or older. The gender makeup of the city was 47.8% male and 52.2% female.

=== 2000 census ===
As of the census of 2000, there were 761 people, 336 households, and 191 families residing in the city. The population density was 1,338.5 inhabitants per square mile (516.8/km^{2}). There were 367 housing units at an average density of 645.5 per square mile (249.2/km^{2}). The racial makeup of the city was 99.61% White, 0.13% African American and 0.26% Native American.

There were 336 households, out of which 23.8% had children under the age of 18 living with them, 47.6% were married couples living together, 6.8% had a female householder with no husband present, and 42.9% were non-families. 40.5% of all households were made up of individuals, and 28.0% had someone living alone who was 65 years of age or older. The average household size was 2.13 and the average family size was 2.88.

In the city, the population was spread out, with 22.6% under the age of 18, 4.9% from 18 to 24, 22.9% from 25 to 44, 17.9% from 45 to 64, and 31.8% who were 65 years of age or older. The median age was 45 years. For every 100 females, there were 87.0 males. For every 100 females age 18 and over, there were 75.8 males.

The median income for a household in the city was $27,841, and the median income for a family was $37,778. Males had a median income of $35,250 versus $20,673 for females. The per capita income for the city was $16,767. About 8.7% of families and 14.1% of the population were below the poverty line, including 14.1% of those under age 18 and 20.0% of those age 65 or over.

== See also ==
- First Presbyterian Church of Steele
