= Fairmont Opera House =

- U.S. National Register of Historic Places
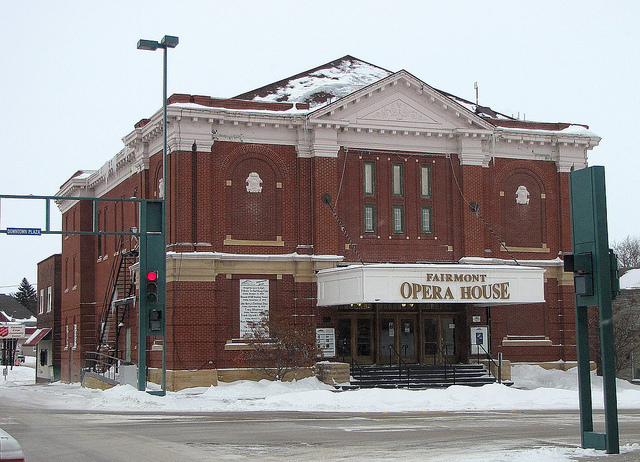

- Location within Minnesota Location within the United States
- Location: Downtown Plaza and Blue Earth Ave., Fairmont, Minnesota
- Coordinates: 43°39′7″N 94°27′43″W
- Area: less than one acre
- Built: 1901
- Architect: C.A. Dunham
- NRHP reference No.: 80004530
- Added to NRHP: July 2, 1980

The Fairmont Opera House in Fairmont, Minnesota was built in 1901. Frank A. Day, editor of the Fairmont Sentinel, prodded local businessmen to establish an opera house starting in 1899. The Fairmont Opera House Company acquired the land in July, 1901 and began construction. The first grand opening was on February 11, 1902, with the opening show being "The Chaperone" performed by the Frank L. Perley Singing Comedians. From 1902 through 1912, it housed a variety of events such as traveling stock companies, local talent shows, graduation ceremonies, musicals, conventions, and political meetings. In 1912, W.L. Nicholas and Billy Hay became the managers, changed its name to the Haynic Theater, and began to show movies there. In 1926, the house was remodeled to accommodate live stock companies, road shows, and movies. Billy Hay died in 1926, and the opera house was rechristened the Nicholas Theatre, with a grand opening on July 27, 1927. The 1927 opening introduced an organ by Marr and Colton, complete with sound effects such as drums, a xylophone, car horns, horses' hoof beats, cymbals, and other novelties. The Nicholas Theater was used exclusively as a movie house until 1980.

In July 1979, organizers led by Dr. Robert Arneson and his wife Mary began an effort to list the theater on the National Register of Historic Places, which was approved in February, 1980 by the Minnesota Historical Society. A nonprofit group bought the building for $51,000 in November 1980, and organized efforts to remodel and repair the building.
