= Butler Square =

- Butler Brothers Company
- U.S. National Register of Historic Places
- Minneapolis Landmark
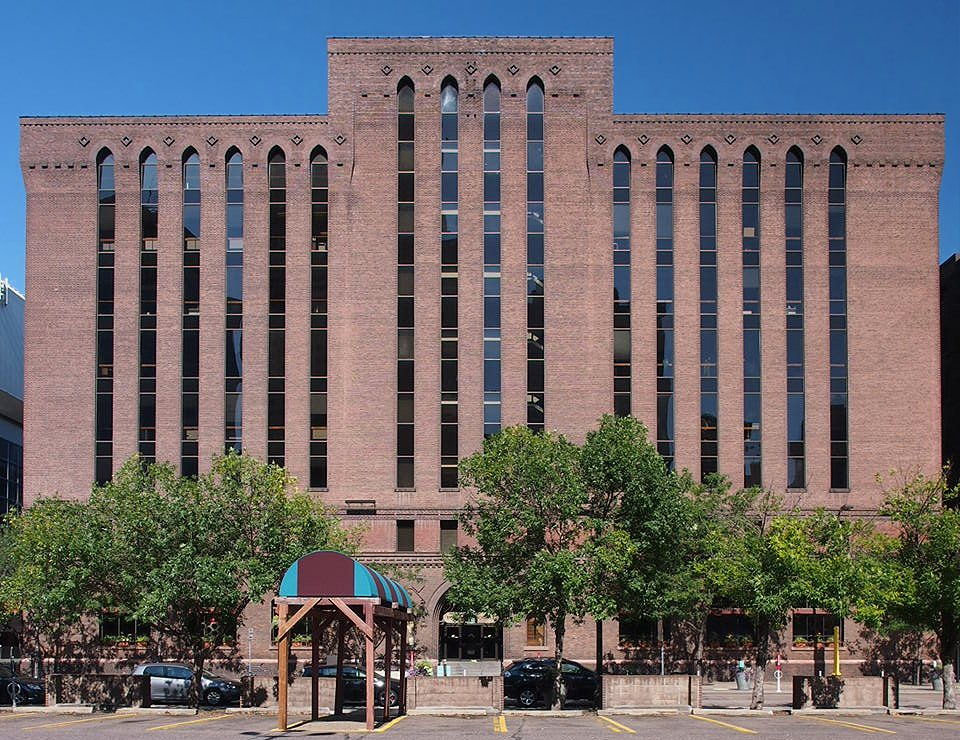
- The Butler Brothers Company building from the southeast

- Location within Minnesota Location within the United States
- Location: 518 First Avenue North; 100 North Sixth Street (corner of First Avenue and Sixth Street); Minneapolis, Minnesota
- Coordinates: 44°58′49″N 93°16′30″W
- Area: 1.288 acres (0.521 ha)
- Built: 1906–08
- Architect: Harry Wild Jones
- NRHP reference No.: 71000437

Significant dates
- Added to NRHP: March 11, 1971
- Designated MPLSL: 1973

Butler Square (originally the Butler Brothers Company building) is a former warehouse and office building in Minneapolis, Minnesota, United States. The building is located within the Minneapolis warehouse district and was listed on the National Register of Historic Places in 1971. It is significant for its restrained Chicago School design by major Minneapolis architect Harry Wild Jones, and as a leading example of the older warehouse/office buildings in Minneapolis–Saint Paul. Jones designed other buildings in Minneapolis such as the Minneapolis Scottish Rite Temple, Calvary Baptist Church, the Lakewood Cemetery Chapel, and the Washburn Park Water Tower.

It was originally built as a warehouse for Butler Brothers, a mail-order firm, on the land that formerly housed the Athletic Park baseball stadium. It had rather heavy construction in keeping with its function as a warehouse, featuring thick interior masonry walls with thin, recessed windows topped by corbelled parapets. The interior is built with heavy timber posts and beams, cut from Douglas fir grown near Aitkin, Minnesota. The columns are 24 inches (61 cm) wide at the bottom level, gradually diminishing to 9 inches (23 cm) wide on the top level. The basement included a horse stable, to accommodate deliveries, and the building had three large coal-fired boilers for heating. Mechanical elevators were used to move goods throughout the building. The building had a rail spur to facilitate boxcar loading. Gradually, as truck transportation became more competitive with rail transportation, the urban location of the building rendered it inefficient as a warehouse.

In 1972 real estate developer Charles Coyer purchased the building with plans to rebuild the east half of the building as an office-retail complex. As part of the renovation, a central atrium in the eastern half of the building was built to allow natural light into the building. This made the retail and office space more marketable, since the large floor space and small windows made it difficult to get enough natural light into the interior. James H. Binger purchased the building in 1979 with similar plans to develop the west half of the building. The atrium on western side was built with more of the heavy timber construction exposed, and more efficient mechanical systems were installed. The renovation of the building has served as a catalyst for additional development and preservation within the Minneapolis Warehouse District.

== See also ==
- National Register of Historic Places listings in Hennepin County, Minnesota
