= Charles Draper Faulkner =

American architect (1890–1979)

- Born: March 11, 1890; San Francisco, California
- Died: December 31, 1979 (aged 89); Downers Grove, Illinois
- Occupation: Architect

Charles Draper Faulkner (March 11, 1890 – December 31, 1979) was a Chicago-based American architect renowned for the churches and other buildings that he designed in the United States and Japan. He designed over 33 Christian Science church buildings and wrote a book called Christian Science Church Edifices.

== Early life and education ==
Charles Draper Faulkner was born in San Francisco, California, After graduating from Calumet High School in Chicago, he went to Armour Institute of Technology, now Illinois Institute of Technology and in 1913 received a B.S. in Architecture. Most of his senior year at A.I.T. was spent on a traveling scholarship in Canada and six countries in Europe.

== Career history ==
From 1913 to 1917 he worked as chief designer for renowned Chicago architect Solon Spencer Beman. In 1919 he opened his own firm in Chicago. From 1935-1937 he also did work for the U.S. government. After his son, Charles Draper Faulkner, Jr., joined him in the practice, he changed his firm name to Faulkner, Faulkner & Associates. He was a member of the Chicago chapter of the A.I.A. and held various offices from 1946 to 1954. He worked with architect Charles Sumner Duke on multiple occasions, notably on the construction of three Christian Science churches and a nursing home.

Faulkner, and later his son, where among the most prolific 20th century architects of Christian Science branch churches, designing over 160 churches during 75 years. He wrote a book in 1946, Christian Science Church Edifices, describing the importance of church architecture and how it speaks for the religion itself. The book contains many illustrations of churches, and is seen as an important book on the topic of church architecture, especially related to the Christian Science movement.

== Style ==
Faulkner opposed excessive ornamentation and believed there was "no such thing" in a single style of Christian Science architecture; but eventually settled on the Colonial style as the most appropriate for its simplicity, cost-effectiveness, and American roots. Some of the other building styles he utilized include Romanesque, Georgian, and Renaissance-revival.

== Works ==
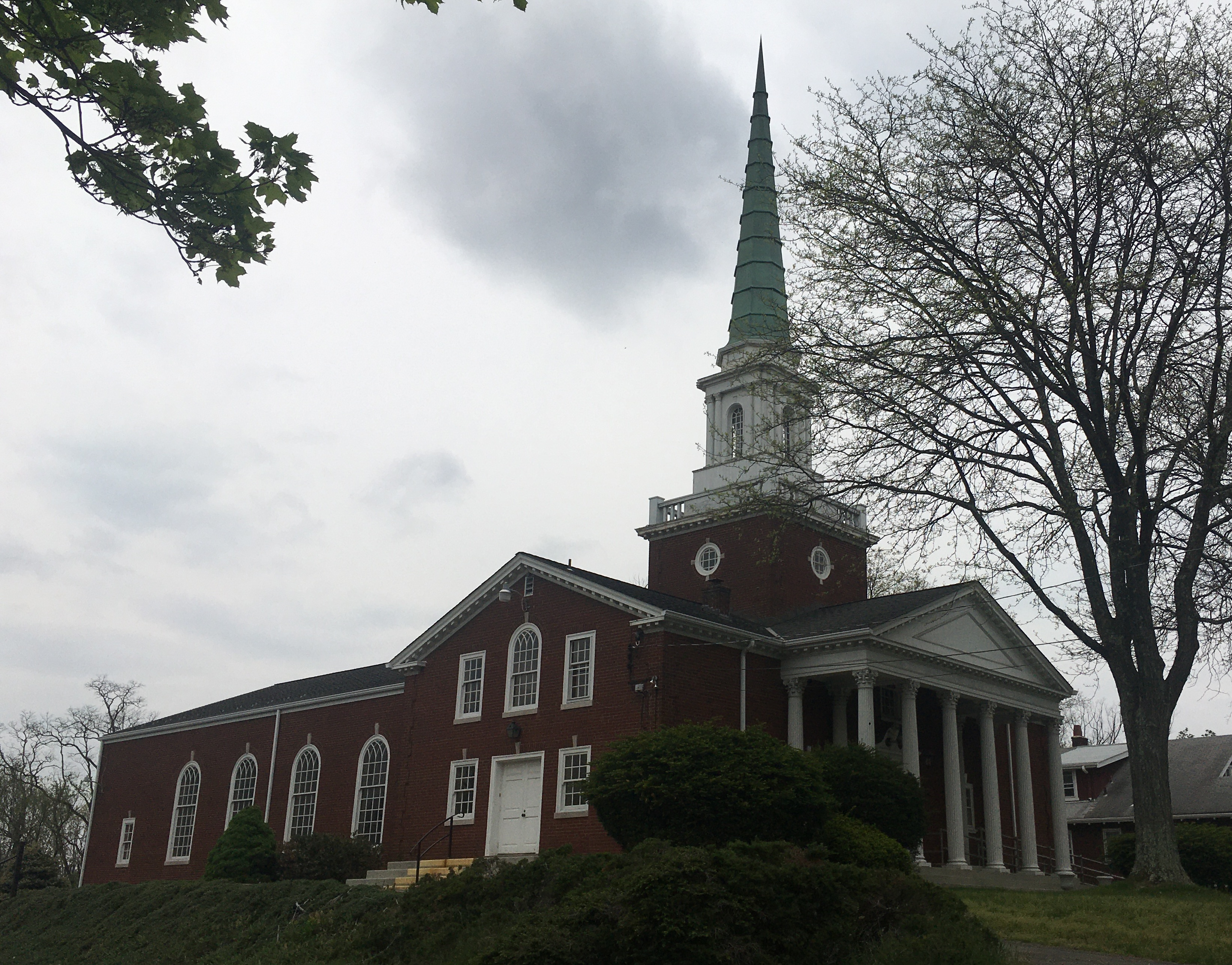
First Church of Christ, Scientist, Mt. Lebanon, Pennsylvania

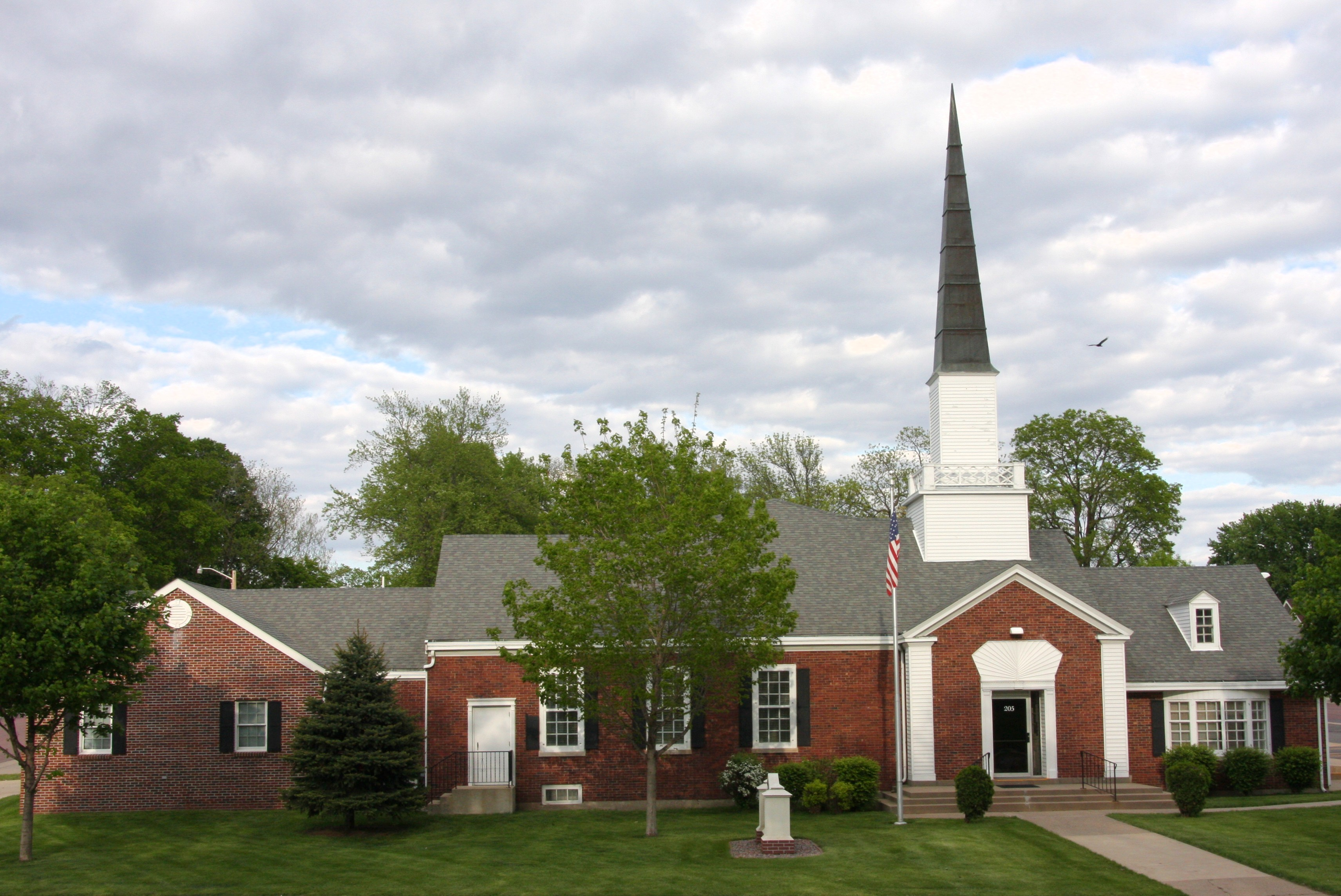
First Church of Christ, Scientist, Fairmont, Minnesota

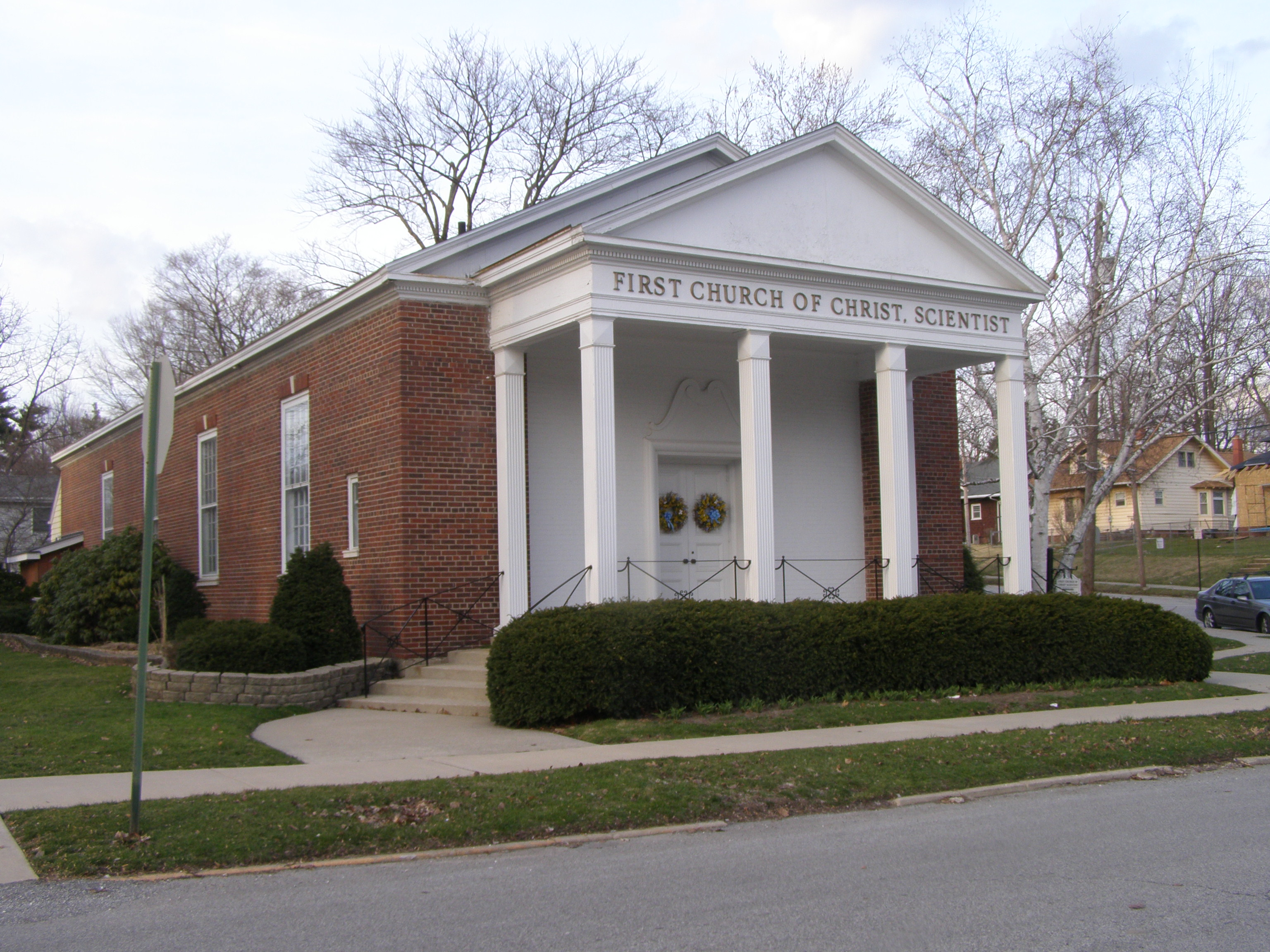
First Church of Christ, Scientist, Valparaiso, Indiana

=== Christian Science churches ===
Note: all Churches of Christ, Scientist, are numbered: First, Second, Third, etc.

==== Japan ====
- First, Tokyo

==== United States ====
- Illinois
  - Fifteenth, Chicago (interior)
  - Eighteenth, Chicago
- Indiana
  - First, Valparaiso
- Kentucky
  - First, Lexington
- Michigan
  - First, Albion
  - First, Dearborn
- Minnesota
  - First, Fairmont
- Missouri
  - Seventh, St. Louis (interior)
- New Jersey
  - First, Montclair
- New York
  - Eighth, New York
- North Carolina
  - First, Charlotte
- Ohio
  - First, Lakewood
  - First, Marion
- Pennsylvania
  - First, Mt. Lebanon
  - Wheatland Presbyterian Church (First Church of Christ Scientist), Lancaster, PA
- Texas
  - First, Baytown
- Virginia
  - First, Williamsburg
- Wisconsin
  - First, Wauwatosa
  - Fourth, Milwaukee

=== Other buildings ===
==== Chicago ====
- Beverly Unitarian Church, school building, 1959, Chicago
- Oakhaven Old People's Home, 1922, with Charles Sumner Duke
- 6737 S Bennett Avenue, 1927
- 6835 S Bennett Avenue, 1925
- 6907 S Bennett Avenue, 1926
- 6921 S Bennett Avenue, 1910s
- 6841 S Constance Avenue, 1920s
- 6845 S Constance Avenue, 1925
- 6757 S Cregier Avenue, 1920s
- 2666 E 73rd Street, 1928
- 2309 E 71st Street, 1920s
- 635 E. 79th St., Chicago, Illinois
- 8030 S. Cottage Grove Ave., Chicago, Illinois

Other buildings include some of those found in the South Shore, Morgan Park, and the Jackson Park Highlands Chicago Landmark District.

==== Elsewhere ====
- Good Shepherd United Protestant Church, 1957, Park Forest
- Trinity Episcopal Church, 1958, Wheaton, Illinois
- Nippersink Resort buildings, Genoa City, WI
- The Shinner Memorial Playground Clubhouse, 1932

== Death ==
In 1979, Charles Draper Faulkner died a resident of Downers Grove, Illinois.

Daystar Foundation in Oklahoma City houses a collection of Faulkner and his son's architectural drawings, photos, slides, documents, and other historical items.

== Published works ==
- Christian Science Church Edifices. 1946.
