= Tangletown, Minneapolis =

Tangletown
- Neighborhood
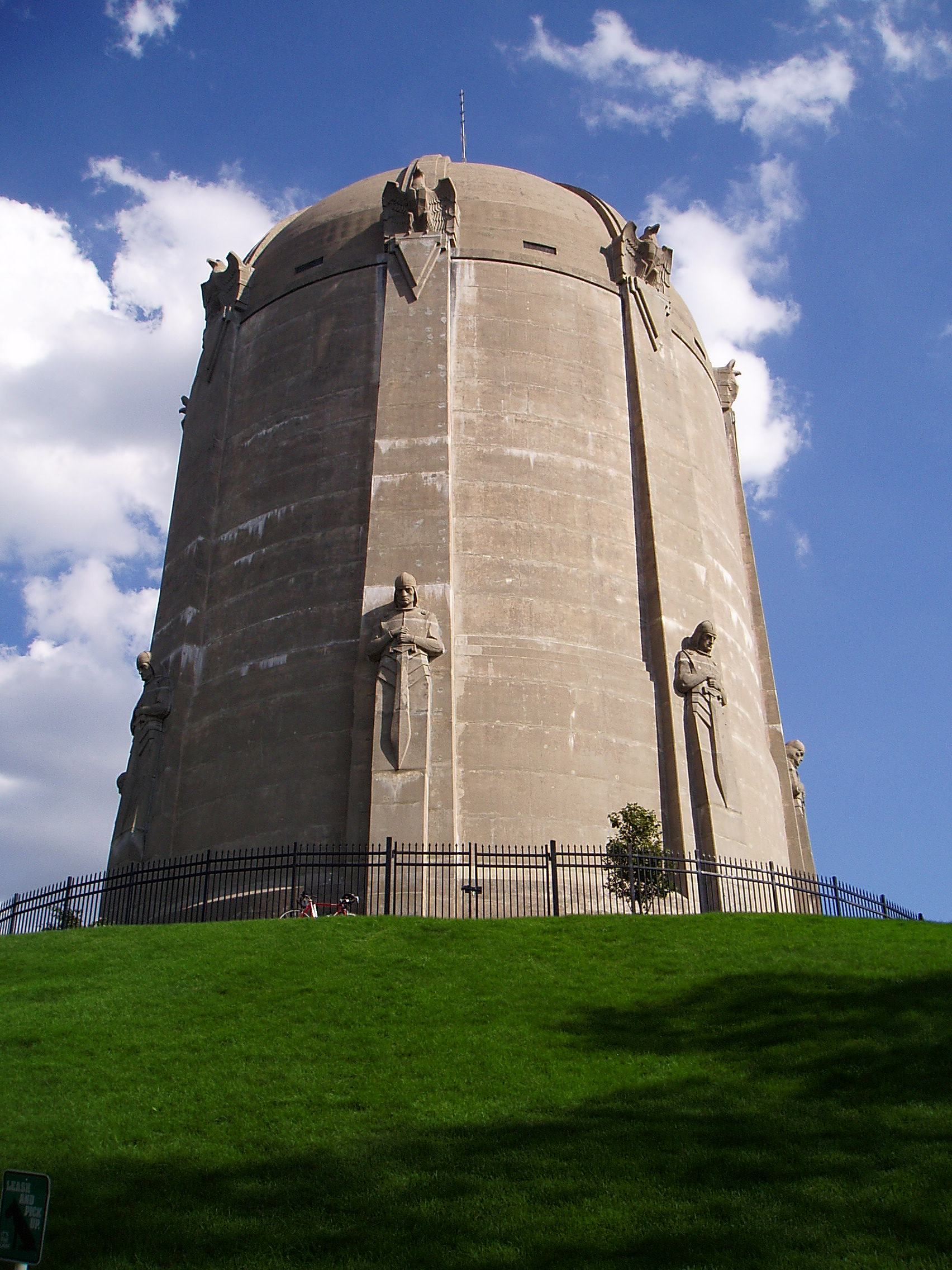
- Washburn Park Water Tower is located at the highest point in the neighborhood.
- Nickname: Fuller
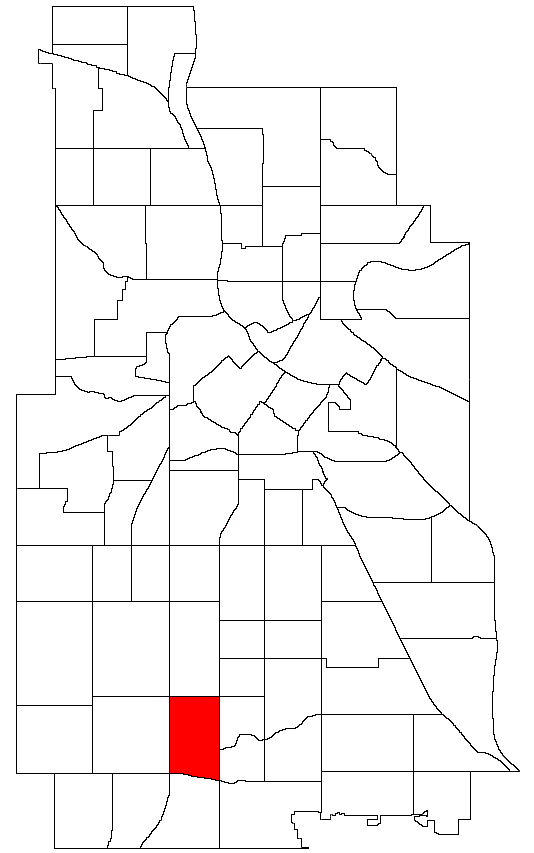
- Location of Tangletown within the U.S. city of Minneapolis
- Interactive map of Tangletown
- Coordinates: 44°54′44″N 93°17′0″W
- Country: United States
- State: Minnesota
- County: Hennepin
- City: Minneapolis
- Community: Southwest
- Founded: 1849
- City Council Ward: 11

Government
  - Council Member: Jamison Whiting

Area
  - Total: 0.688 sq mi (1.78 km^{2})
- Elevation: 900 ft (270 m)

Population (2020)
  - Total: 4,643
  - Density: 6,750/sq mi (2,610/km^{2})
- Time zone: UTC-6 (CST)
  - Summer (DST): UTC-5 (CDT)
- ZIP code: 55409, 55419
- Area code: 612

Historical population
| Census | Pop. | Note | %± |
|---|---|---|---|
| 1980 | 4,783 | | — |
| 1990 | 4,464 | | −6.7% |
| 2000 | 4,263 | | −4.5% |
| 2010 | 4,351 | | 2.1% |
| 2020 | 4,643 | | 6.7% |

Tangletown is a neighborhood in the Southwest community of Minneapolis. The neighborhood was officially known as Fuller until 1996 when it was changed to the present name, which reflects the winding streets in the neighborhood that do not conform to the regular street grid of South Minneapolis. The neighborhood boundaries are 46th Street to the north, Interstate 35W to the east, Diamond Lake Road to the south, and Lyndale Avenue South to the west. Tangletown is a part of Minneapolis City Council ward 11 and state legislative district 63B.

The Washburn Park Water Tower is located at the highest point in the neighborhood, while Minnehaha Creek runs through the south side of the neighborhood. Washburn High School and Justice Page Middle School are located in this neighborhood.

== Demographics ==
Race/ethnicity
| Race/ethnicity | 2000 | | 2010 | | 2020 | |
| Race/ethnicity | Number | % | Number | % | Number | % |
|---|---|---|---|---|---|---|
| White alone | 3,819 | 89.58 | 3,747 | 86.12 | 3,750 | 80.23 |
| Black alone | 157 | 3.68 | 216 | 4.96 | 387 | 8.28 |
| Hispanic or Latino (any race) | 82 | 1.92 | 148 | 3.40 | 209 | 4.47 |
| Native American alone | 15 | 0.35 | 10 | 0.23 | 14 | 0.30 |
| Asian alone | 68 | 1.60 | 99 | 2.28 | 90 | 1.93 |
| Other race alone | 14 | 0.33 | 1 | 0.02 | 9 | 0.19 |
| Pacific Islander alone | 1 | 0.02 | 2 | 0.05 | 1 | 0.02 |
| Two or more races | 107 | 2.51 | 128 | 2.94 | 214 | 4.58 |
| Total | 4,263 | 100.0 | 4,351 | 100.0 | 4,674 | 100.0 |
