= Karpeles =

Karpeles is a Jewish surname, and may refer to:

- Eliezer Karpeles (1754, Prague – 1832, Lieben), Bohemian rabbi
- Leopold Karpeles (1838, Prague – 1909)
- Gustav Karpeles (1848, Ivanovice na Hané (German: Eiwanowitz/Hanna) – 1909), Jewish Bohemian literary historian, publicist and writer
- Alfred Klaar, born: Aaron Karpeles (1848, Prague – 1927), Jewish (Catholic) Bohemian literary historian, journalist and writer
- Benno Karpeles (1868, Vienna – 1938, Vienna), Jewish Austrian politician, publicist and editor
- Georges Kars, born: Jiří Karpeles (1882, Kralupy – 1945), Jewish-Bohemian painter and artist
- Maud Karpeles (1885, London – 1976)
- Suzanne Karpelès, (1890, Paris – 1968, Pondicherry), Jewish-French Indologist, first curator of the Royal Library of Phnom Penh, Cambodia.
- Mark Karpelès (1985–), CEO of Bitcoin exchange Mt. Gox
- Karpeles Manuscript Library Museum, founded by David Karpeles and Marsha Karpeles
