= Karpeles Manuscript Library Museums =

Private collection of manuscripts and documents in the United States

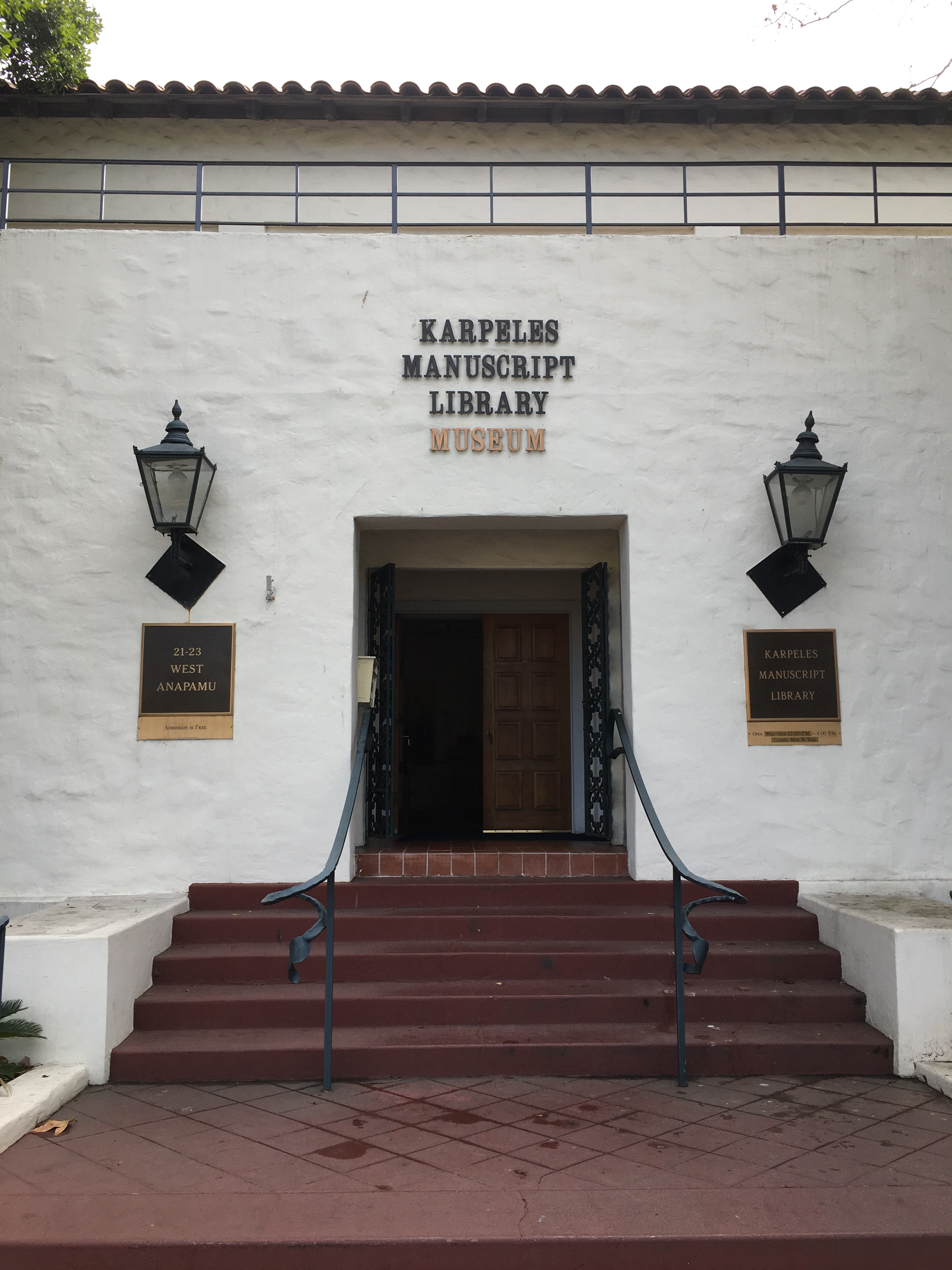
- Karpeles Manuscript Library's first location in Santa Barbara, California
- Established: 1983
- Location: United States, United States
- Coordinates: 34°25′21″N 119°42′18″W
- Type: archive museum
- Founders: David Karpeles, Marsha Karpeles
- Website: Official website

The Karpeles Manuscript Library Museums is one of the largest private collections of historic manuscripts and documents in the world. It was founded in 1983 by California real estate magnates David Karpeles and Marsha Karpeles, with the goal of stimulating interest in learning, especially in children, and to make the collection more accessible, was distributed among many Karpeles museums across the US, each located in a historic building, plus "mini-museums" in schools and office buildings. Items are rotated between museums quarterly. Many museum locations have been permanently closed and buildings sold. The remaining museums are located in Duluth, Minnesota until the building sells and in St. Augustine, Florida, in a brand new and updated space. In addition, Karpeles is aggressively expanding the content of its website. All of the Karpeles Manuscript Library services are free. The museums are located in small and midsize cities, although the Karpeles family put on an exhibit in Central Park West in New York City in 1991. As of June 2023, there are ten museums.

David Karpeles died on January 19, 2022. As of February 2026, his family announced they will be consolidating the collection at the St. Augustine, Florida location, and selling off the buildings hosting the collection in other states.

== Library locations ==
=== Buffalo, New York ===
In Buffalo, the Karpeles Museum is located at North Hall at 220 North Street at Elmwood Avenue. The North Hall was originally First Church of Christ, Scientist, built in 1911. The architecture of the building was designed to mimic a medieval church both inside and out, and the structure creates a dominating and fascinating location for the Karpeles Manuscript Library Museum. The rough textured building contrasts with its vibrant red roof tiles and 25 foot picture windows. The cavernous interior is characterized by many bays, wings and a massive room divider. Furthermore, its atypical asymmetric design complements the triangular corner lot. The museum was featured in the movie Nightmare Alley.

The museum formerly consisted of two separate buildings - the other at Porter Hall at 453 Porter Avenue at Jersey Street and Plymouth Avenue - which consolidated after David Karpeles' death in 2022. Porter Hall was originally the Plymouth Methodist Church.

=== Duluth, Minnesota ===
The Duluth Museum at 902 East 1st Street was originally First Church of Christ, Scientist, built in 1912; the original organ has been retained in the rotunda. The structure is a beautiful building with a large main floor exhibit hall. As the ceiling is high, the acoustics are excellent and the building is very suitable for musical concerts and other programs. The Karpeles Manuscript Library Museum in Duluth provides a School Outreach Program with reproductions of original documents in special display cases located in area schools, colleges and libraries. At the present time the museum supports seventeen elementary, junior and high schools in Duluth, the Twin Cities area and also now in Wisconsin and Canada. The documents and manuscripts are specially chosen to supplement school curriculum and matters of topical interest and are also on display at two local colleges and three public libraries.

=== Rock Island, Illinois ===
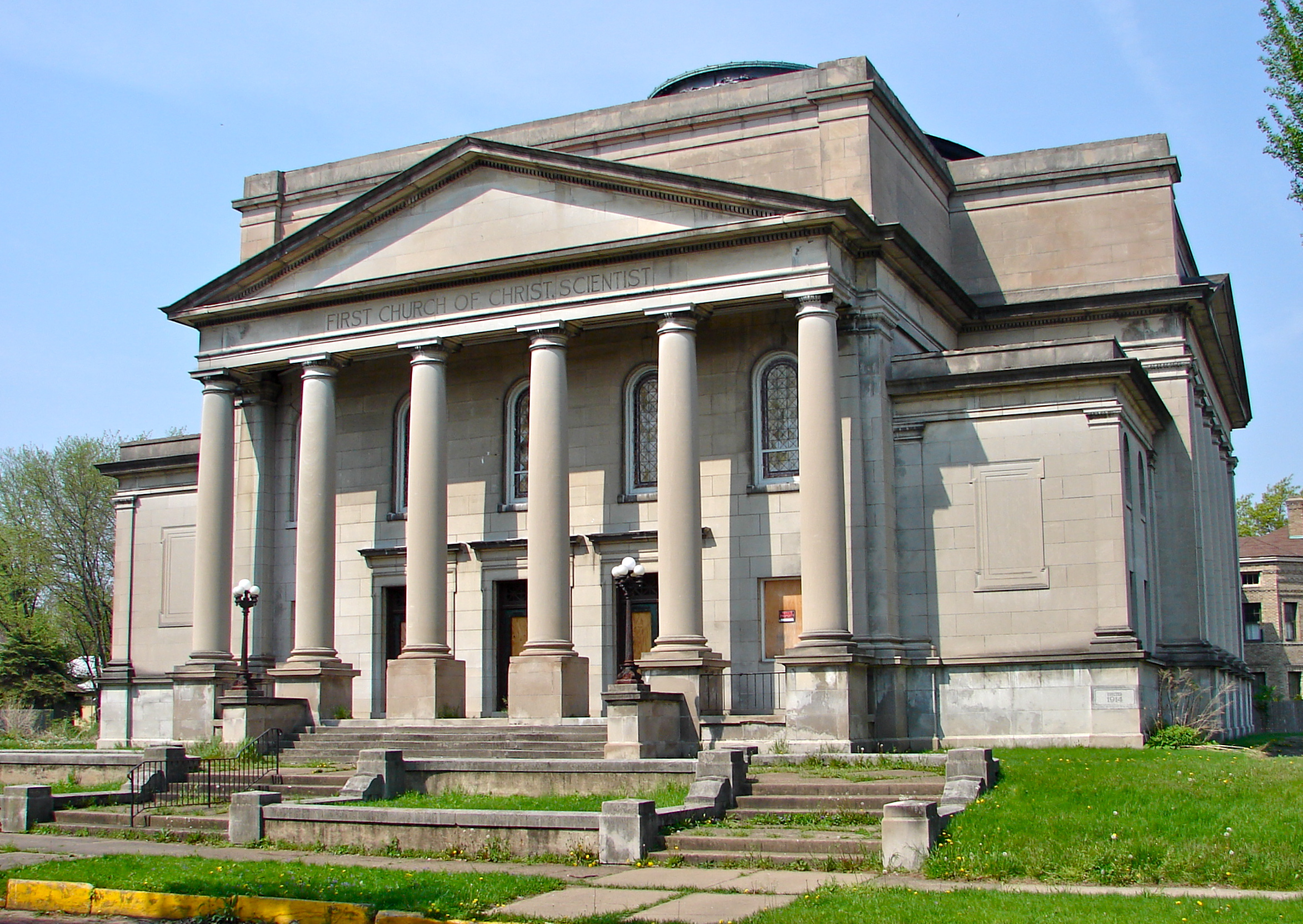
The Rock Island location

The museum building in Rock Island was originally First Church of Christ, Scientist, built in 1896 in the Broadway Historic District. The building was designed by architect William C. Jones of Chicago in the Palladian style, it was built between 1914-1915. Its exterior walls are of brick covered by Bedford limestone. Its superimposed front portico is supported by six 2 story columns with egg-and-dart capitals. The dome actually consists of 2 domes: an outer dome and an inner dome which are separated by a space for lighting fixtures and maintenance. The inner dome consists of some 8,000 colored fish scale glass panes on a wooden support structure. The building was added to the National Register of Historic Places on August 14, 1998.

=== Santa Barbara, California ===
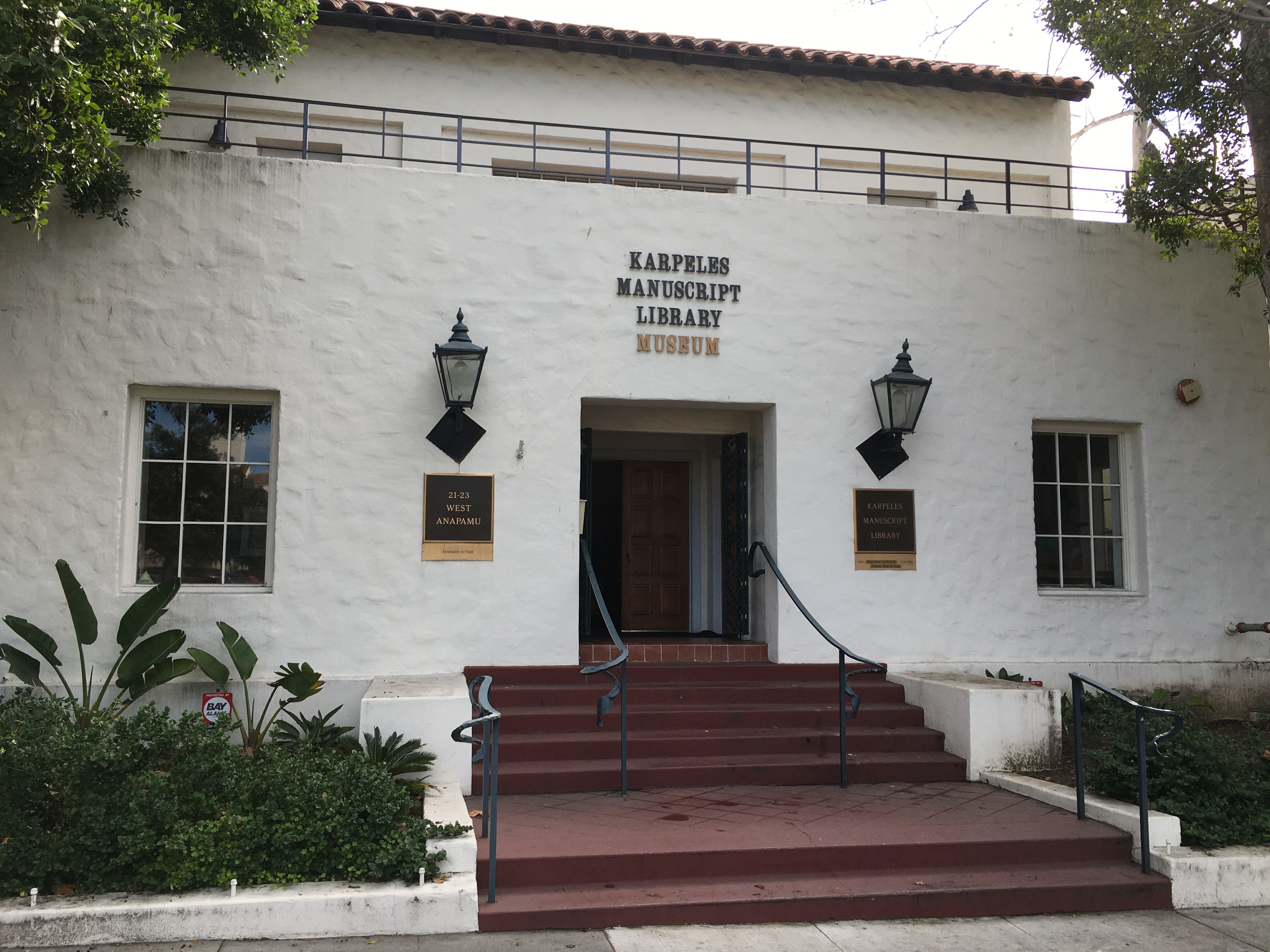
The Santa Barbara location

The Santa Barbara Karpeles Museum, the first to be opened, is at 21 West Anapamu Street. Since its opening in 1986, the Karpeles in Santa Barbara has displayed thousands of historic documents and presented many full exhibits. Among those items on permanent display in the museum is an original Stone copy of the Declaration of Independence, a replica of the globe used by Columbus (sans the Western Hemisphere), handwritten scores by a dozen leading composers, and the computer guidance system used on the first Apollo lander flight to the Moon. The Karpeles in Santa Barbara has played an important role in the educational and cultural life of the area.

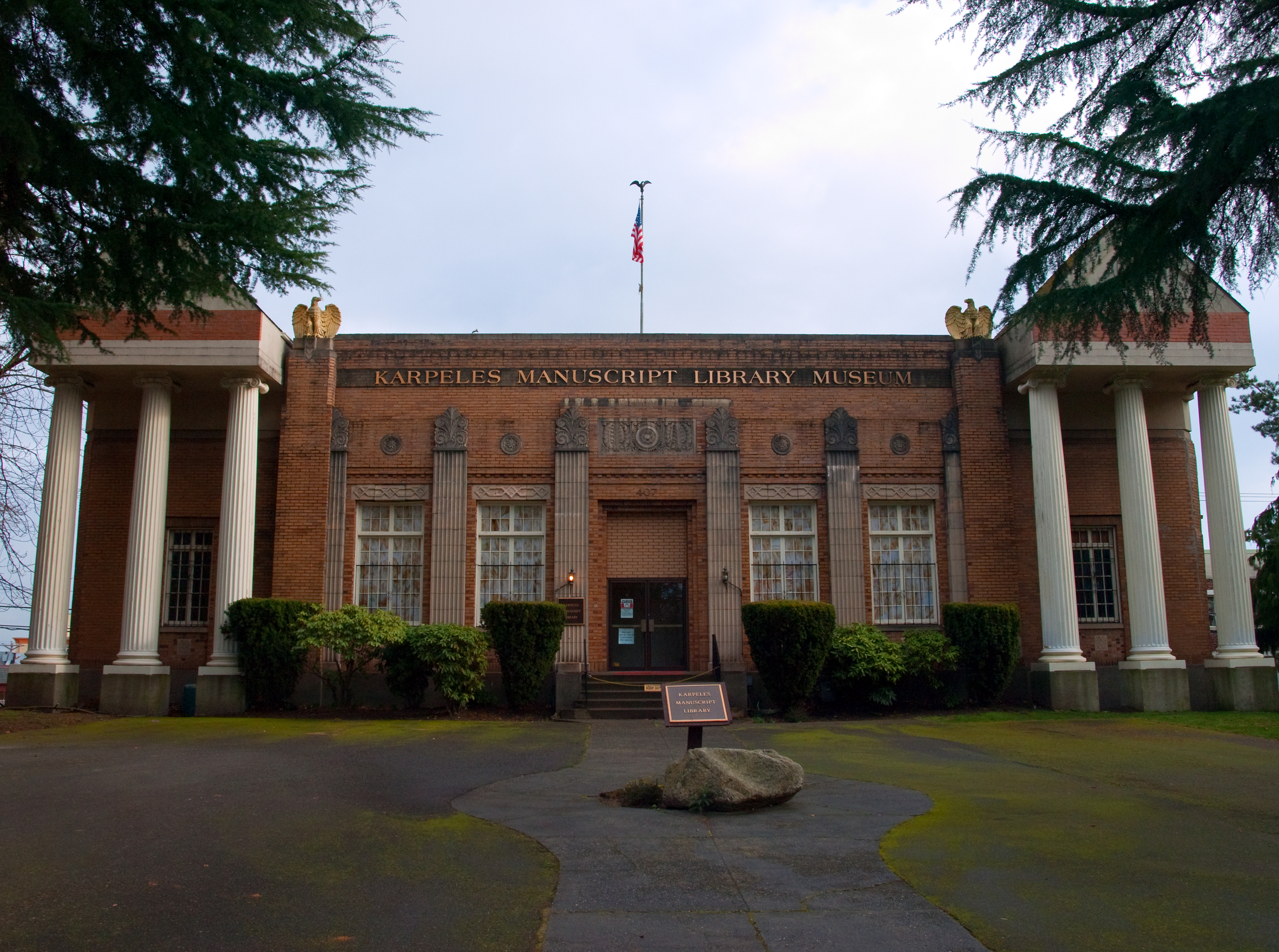
The Tacoma location

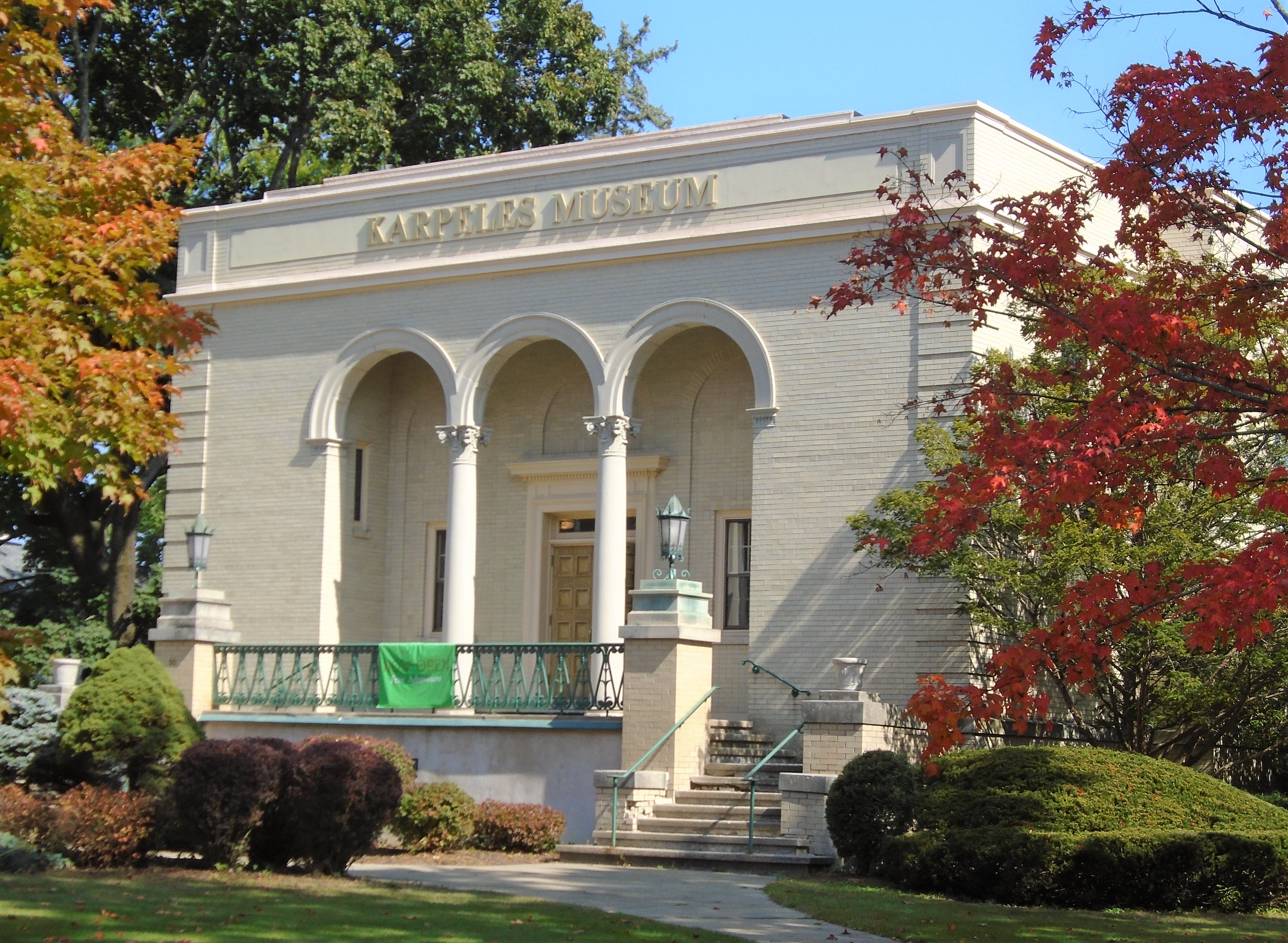
The Gloversville location

=== Gloversville, New York ===
The Karpeles Museum in Gloversville, New York opened in 2020 at 66 Kingsboro Avenue. Housed in a former Christian Science church built in 1923, it is the 15th location in the chain.

=== Alvin, Texas ===
The building's structure was built in 1924. Its Neoclassical design covers over 0.5 acres. A circular stairway leads to majestic Roman-style columns and a second level double door entry. The main floor has a large room with elegant painted murals and textured ceilings. An original map of Alvin, TX, can be found as part of the Karpeles Manuscript Library Museum’s collection.

=== Lake Mary, Florida ===
The Karpeles Manuscript Library also hosts a Museum in their corporate office close to Orlando, Florida. The location's Director is one of the granddaughters of the founder.

=== Pittsburgh, Pennsylvania ===
This museum's building is the former Holy Innocents Church that was built in 1902, which was replaced with the current structure completed in 1925. The Holy Innocents Church closed its doors in 2016. The building remained vacant until the Karpeles Manuscript Library Museum purchased the building in 2019. It is evocative of the Notre Dame Cathedral in Paris.

=== St. Augustine, Florida ===
St. Augustine's Karpeles Manuscript Library Mini Museum is the world's smallest walk-in museum and the newest addition to the museum family.

== Former locations ==
=== Charleston, South Carolina ===
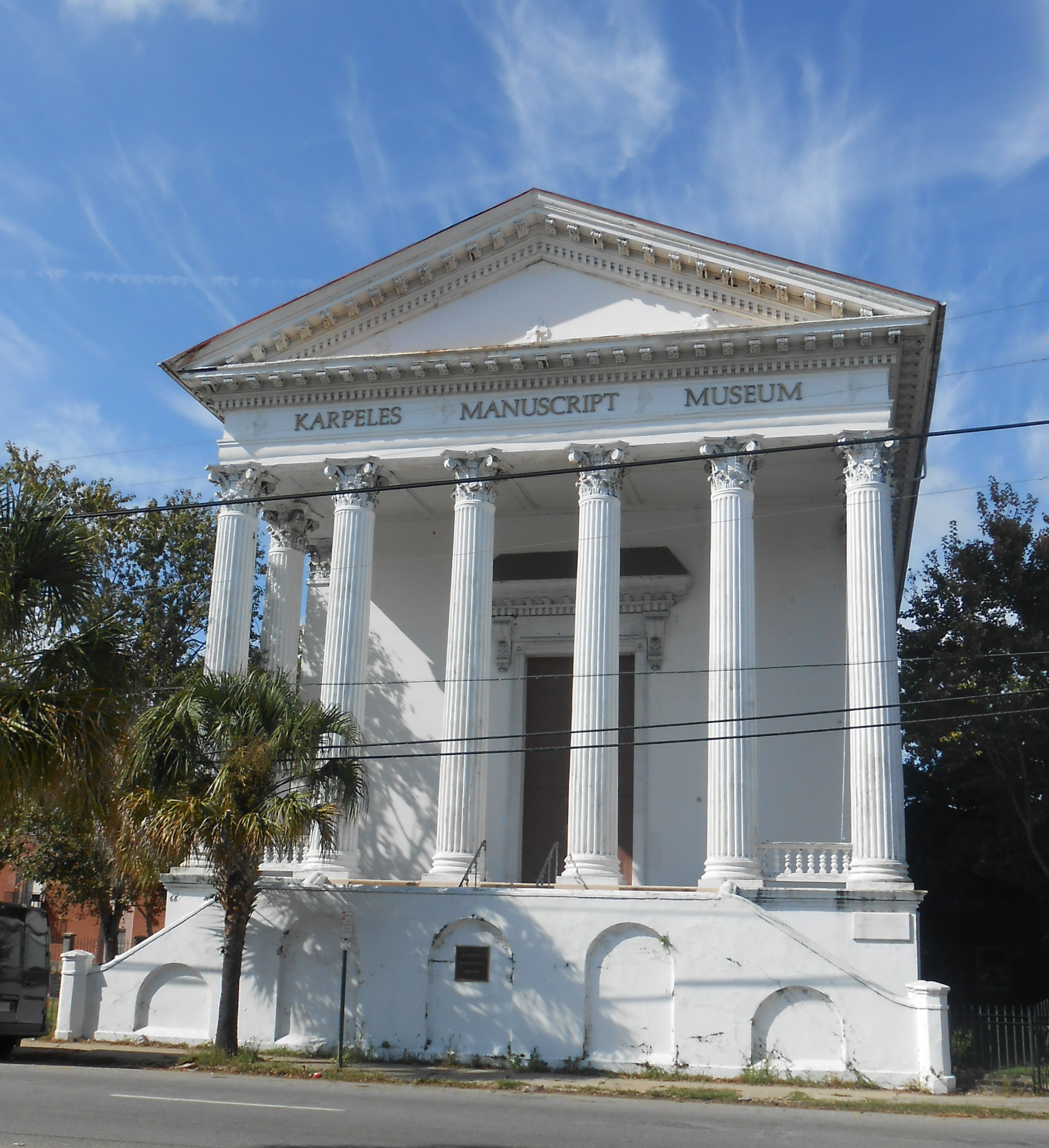
The Charleston location

Karpeles Manuscript Museum in Charleston was housed in the former St. James Chapel, a Methodist church built in 1856. The building is in the Greek Revival style following the Corinthian order and was inspired by the Temple of Jupiter in Rome. During the Civil War, Confederates used the building as a hospital and stored medical supplies there. Hurricane Hugo tore off the roof of the building and destroyed its interior on September 21, 1989. Following renovation, the building reopened on November 11, 1990.

=== Fort Wayne, Indiana ===
The Karpeles Museum in Fort Wayne occupied two buildings. Fairfield Hall at 2410 Fairfield Avenue is the former First Church of Christ, Scientist building and housed a rotating collection of historical documents, old and ancient ship models, and stone hieroglyphic inscriptions from the time of Moses. Piqua Hall was housed in a domed church at 3039 Piqua Avenue built in 1917 as the First Church of God. It housed a rotating collection of historical maps.

The Fort Wayne location provided an educational outreach program in the form of mini-museum displays that were set up in local schools and maintained by museum staff.

=== Jacksonville, Florida ===
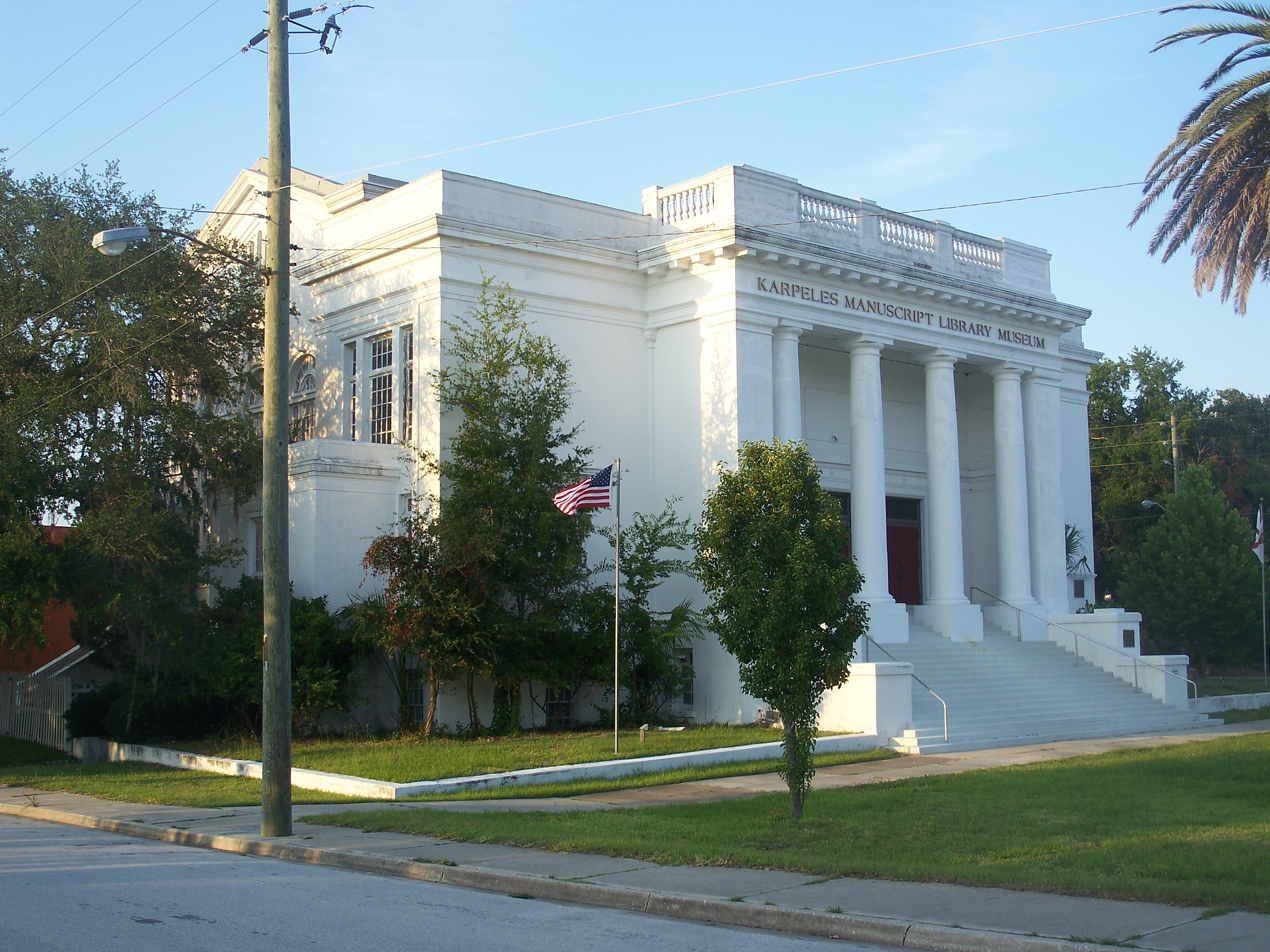
The Jacksonville location

The Jacksonville Karpeles Manuscript Library Museum was located in the former First Church of Christ, Scientist building, a 1921 neoclassical structure in the Springfield neighborhood. There was also an antique book library, with volumes dating from the late 19th century, and a children's center.

=== Newburgh, New York ===
The Karpeles Museum in Newburgh, New York, was located at 94 Broadway. It housed the Dona McPhillips Historical Painting Series, which includes many portraits of famous Americans grouped together as "Founding Fathers", "Civil War Union", "Civil War Confederates", "Indian Heroes", "More Indian Heroes", "Pathfinders", "Texas", "Blacks", "Pioneers" and "Women".

=== St. Louis, Missouri ===
The St. Louis branch of the Karpeles Manuscript Library opened on August 1, 2015. St. Louis is the largest metropolitan area to host a Karpeles Manuscript Library Museum. The museum was located at 3524 Russell Boulevard, near Grand Boulevard and across the street from Compton Hill Reservoir Park. The structure was built as the Third Church of Christ, Scientist, and opened in 1911 (it had been occupied in later decades by The New Paradise Missionary Baptist Church). The St. Louis Media History Foundation's Archives Exhibit Room was also housed in the building. The collection was featured on the PBS program, "Living St.Louis."

On March 26, 2019, a three alarm fire broke out at the museum causing considerable damage, mostly to the roof and the back of the building. About 80 firefighters were dispatched to the scene to fight the fire and haul out historic pieces such as old wooden ships and statues. St. Louis Building Commissioner Frank Oswald said the building was structurally sound and could be repaired, as it had a steel, not wooden, skeleton. As of 14 January 2021, the roof has not yet been repaired. The building has since been sold.

=== Shreveport, Louisiana ===
The Karpeles Manuscript Library in Shreveport at 3201 Centenary Avenue was originally First Church of Christ, Scientist.

=== Tacoma, Washington ===
The Karpeles Manuscript Museum in Tacoma, Washington, which opened in 1991, was located at 407 South G Street in a former American Legion post built in 1931, across the street from the Wright Park Arboretum. The Tacoma location permanently closed in January 2024 and the building was sold to the Garden City Covenant Church.

== Examples of documents from the collection ==
=== Music ===
- Ludwig van Beethoven's Emperor Concerto
- Handel's Messiah, copied in the hand of Beethoven
- Wolfgang Amadeus Mozart's The Marriage of Figaro
- Richard Wagner's "Wedding March"

=== Science ===
- Darwin's Theory of Evolution
- Descartes' Treatise as the Father of Philosophy
- Einstein's Theory of Relativity
- Galileo's announcement of the completion of his publication Dialogue on Two New Sciences
- Some of Donald A. Hall's initial sketches and calculations for the design of the Spirit of St. Louis
- Excerpts from John Locke's Essay Concerning Human Understanding
- A note written by Charles Lindbergh
- A portion of Newton's studies on religion
- Astronomer Michael Molnar's Mystery of the Star of Bethlehem

=== Religion ===
- The first printing of the Ten Commandments from The Gutenberg Bible (ca. 1455)
- John Calvin's Ioannis Calvinus
- Luther and the Birth of the Protestant Movement
- Pope Lucius III's Proclamation of the Holy Crusade

=== Literature ===
- Roget's Thesaurus
- The stage version of Mark Twain's Tom Sawyer
- Webster's Dictionary

=== Political history ===
- Bill of Rights
- Confederate Constitution
- The Declaration of Allegiance to the Government of the United States by the Native American Indians
- Lincoln's Emancipation Proclamation
- John Hancock's Cover Letter to the Declaration of Independence
- Olive Branch Petition
- George Washington's Thanksgiving Proclamation

=== Exploration ===
- Christopher Columbus's Lettera Rarissima
- Sir Ernest Shackleton's hand-drawn map of Antarctica
- Amelia Earhart's Certificate of Landing for her solo flight across the Atlantic

=== Artwork ===
- Pat Burger Homeless Exhibit Collection
- Dona McPhillips Historical Exhibit Collection
- Norman Rockwell pencil drafts Exhibit Collection
- The Brock Brothers Illustration Archive
- Classic Book Illustrations

== Programs ==
The Library provides special educational programs and lectures for schools at all levels. The most popular of these are the Cultural Literacy Program and the School Outreach Program. In addition, Mini-Museums are maintained in many universities, secondary schools and grade schools throughout the country. These are free programs and grade schools, secondary schools, colleges or universities may participate.
