= Karpeles Manuscript Library Museum (Jacksonville) =

Museum in Jacksonville, Florida

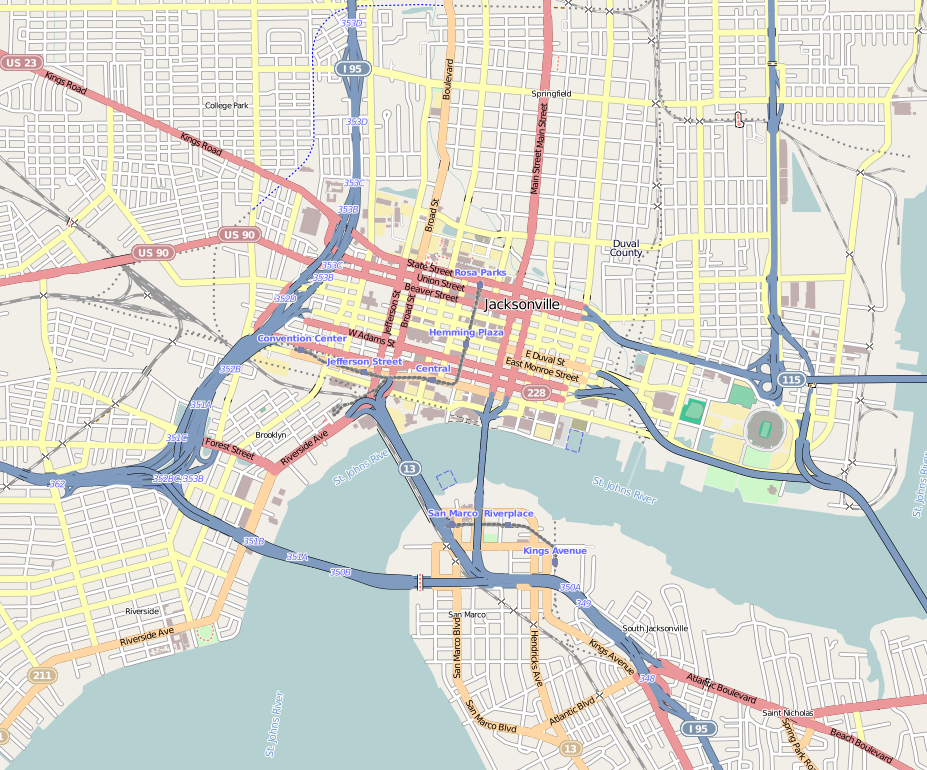
- Location of Karpeles Manuscript Library Museum in Jacksonville Karpeles Manuscript Library Museum (Jacksonville) (Florida)
- Established: 1992
- Location: 101 West 1st Street (formerly 1116 North Laura Street); Jacksonville, Florida
- Coordinates: 30.33681°N 81.65683°W
- Public transit access: Bus: L8, L7, Monorail: Rosa L. Parks Station
- Website: karpeles.com/museums/jax.php
- First Church of Christ, Scientist; Jacksonville, Florida
- U.S. Historic district – Contributing property
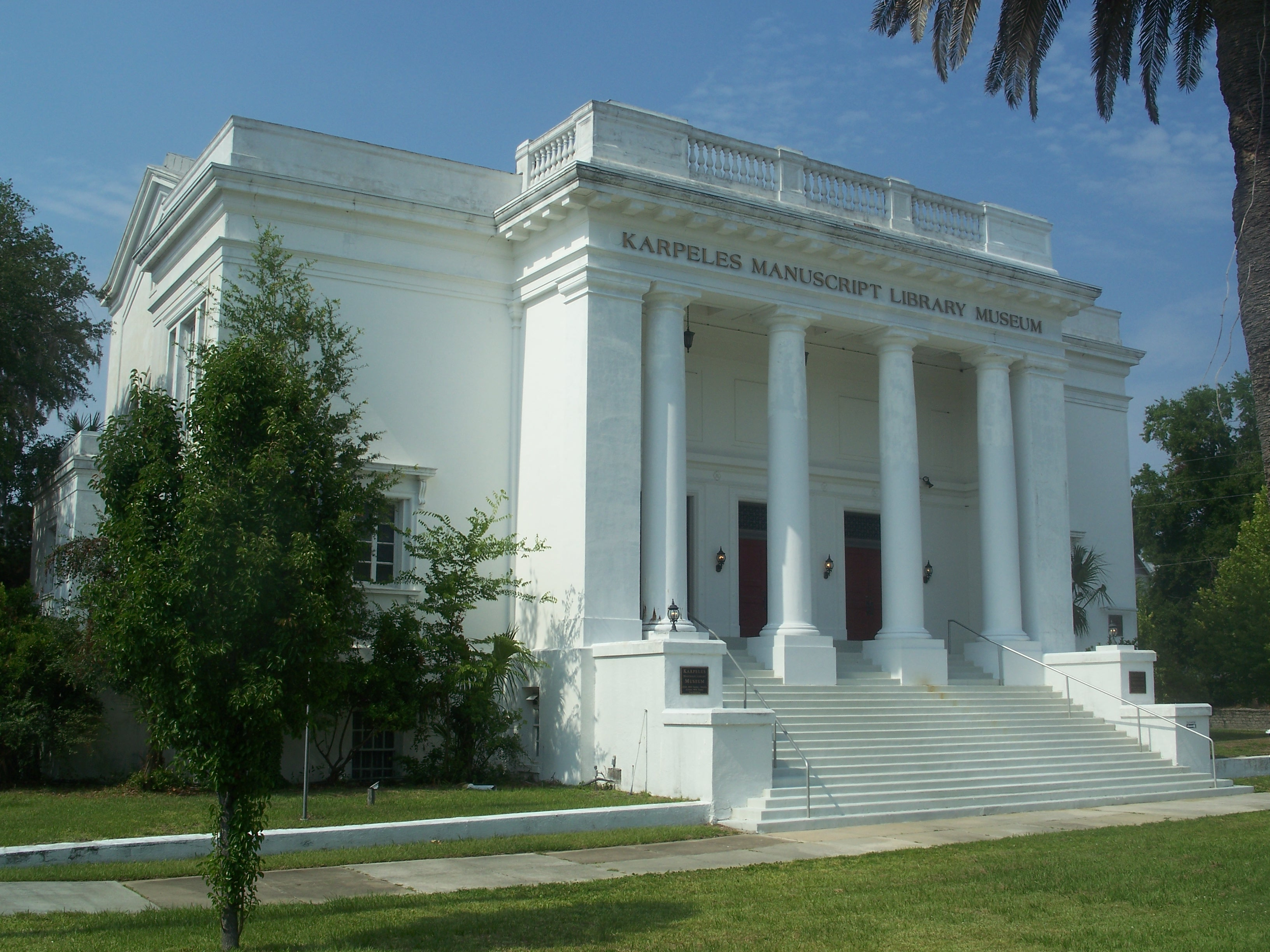
- Built: 1921
- Architect: Marsh and Saxelbye, architects; W.D. Gerbrich, builder
- Architectural style: Classical Revival
- Designated CP: June 24, 1986

The Karpeles Manuscript Library Museum was a museum in Jacksonville, Florida, one of ten (as of June 2023) Karpeles Manuscript Library Museums in the United States, all housed in repurposed old buildings. Other locations of Karpeles Museums include Buffalo, NY; Duluth, MN; Santa Barbara, CA; Tacoma, WA; Alvin, TX; Rock Island, IL; Gloversville, NY; Lake Mary, FL; Pittsburgh, PA; and St. Augustine, FL. Karpeles Manuscript Library Museums display manuscripts and documents from the private collection of David and Marsha Karpeles, the world's largest privately owned collection.

The museum opened in 1992 in the former First Church of Christ, Scientist building in Jacksonville's Springfield neighborhood. The Classical Revival structure, constructed in 1921, is a contributing property in the Springfield Historic District and is listed as No. SP-61 by the Jacksonville Historic Landmarks Commission.

== Building ==
This impressive former church building stands at the entrance to Springfield and overlooks Henry J. Klutho Park and Hogans Creek. It features an imposing Neo-Classical Revival facade, highlighted by monumental Doric columns, a departure from the more usual ecclesiastical styles of the era (such as Gothic Revival, Romanesque Revival, Spanish). It is also unusual among churches for lacking both a steeple and a bell tower. The construction of this sanctuary in 1921 cost $80,000. The architecture firm responsible for its design was Marsh & Saxelbye, and W.D. Gerbrich was the builder.[1]

The first Christian Science services in Jacksonville were held in 1892 and First Church of Christ, Scientist was organized in 1897. It met at several locations in Jacksonville before acquiring the property that would be its permanent home in the Springfield area in 1921. The building, located at 101 West 1st Street (formerly 1116 North Laura Street), was built in the Classical Revival style. A contributing building in the Springfield Historic District, it is listed as No. SP-61 by the Jacksonville Historic Landmarks Commission.

In 1992 the congregation sold the building to David Karpeles. After the sale the church was voluntarily dissolved August 10, 1993.

== Karpeles Museum ==
The Jacksonville Karpeles Manuscript Library Museum opened in 1992. It was privately owned by David Karpeles, a former math professor who made millions investing in real estate before taking up manuscript collecting. In 1983 he began opening museums across the country to house his collection, now the world's largest. The museum featured three or four exhibits from Karpeles' collection a year, as well as exhibits from other collectors and around six art exhibits.

The museum maintained the building's original features, many reflecting its status as a church. These features include large stained glass windows, an altar area, and upstairs gallery seating. There were also relics left behind by the building's former occupants, including a piano and a collection of books that the museum has turned into a sort of special library, allowing visitors to sit in a comfortable chair while reading. As previously owned by Christian Scientists, the books are mostly religious or medical in nature though there are also many classics.

After 30 years, the museum closed in 2023.

In 2023, the former museum was purchased by new owners who reopened the buildings as Karpeles Grand, an event venue.

== See also ==
- List of former Christian Science churches, societies and buildings
