= Robert Wagner House =

Historic house in Illinois, United States

- U.S. National Register of Historic Places
- U.S. Historic district – Contributing property
- Rock Island Landmark
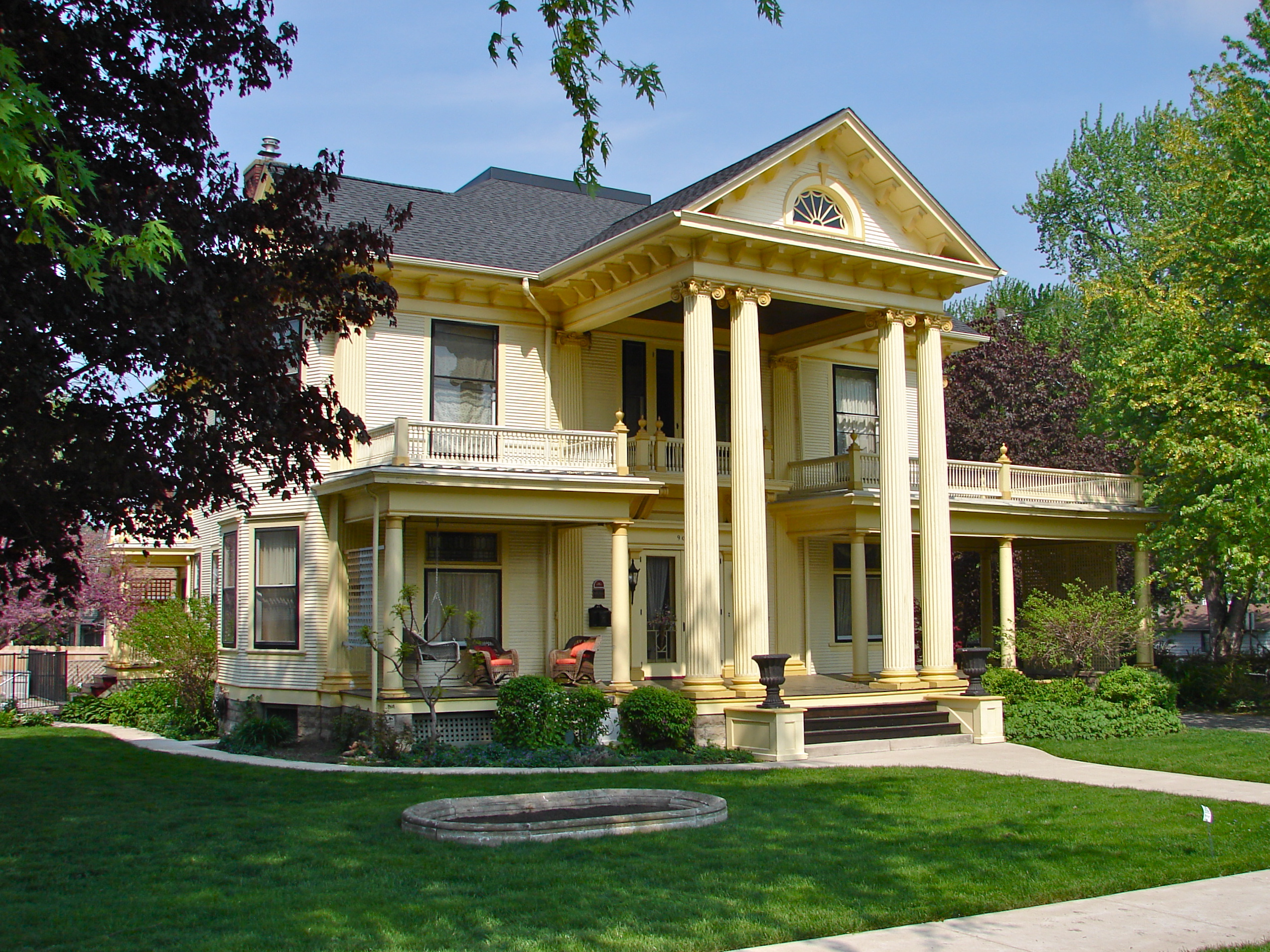

- Location within Illinois Location within the United States
- Location: 904 23rd St. Rock Island, Illinois
- Coordinates: 41°30′8″N 90°34′5″W
- Area: less than one acre
- Built: 1904
- Architect: Frederick G. Clausen
- Architectural style: Classical Revival
- NRHP reference No.: 90000721

Significant dates
- Added to NRHP: May 15, 1990
- Designated RIL: 1984

The Robert Wagner House is an historic building located in Rock Island, Illinois. It was designated as a Rock Island Landmark in 1984, individually listed on the National Register of Historic Places in 1990, and became part of the Broadway Historic District on the National Register in 1998.

== History ==
Robert Wagner was the son of George Wagner who owned Atlantic Brewery in Rock Island. He received his education from the University of Iowa and the United States Brewers' Academy in New York City. After completing he studies, he worked as a foreman in his father's brewery before joining his father to manage the business. In 1892 the three breweries in Rock Island consolidated to form the Rock Island Brewing Company. Wagner served as its president for three decades. After Prohibition he entered banking and served as the president of American Trust and Savings Bank and People's National Bank.

== Architecture ==
The Wagner home was designed in the Neoclassical style by Frederick G. Clausen of Davenport, Iowa and was built in 1904. It features a three-bay front façade with a central entrance, a balcony, and a two-story portico. The pediment above the porch is supported by pairs of fluted Ionic columns. Bracketed eaves extend along the cornice below a deep overhang. Larger brackets support the entrance balcony. Galleries with turned spindles and urn-shaped finials flank the entrance. The gallery on the north is extended to form a porte cochere. On the north side of the home is a beveled and leaded stairway window. A two-story bay on the south side features a “bottle glass” window. On the interior, the grand staircase features a semi-circular balcony. Original mechanical devices in the home include a speaking tube, doorbell system and a corner light system.
