= Springfield Park (Jacksonville) =

Public park in Jacksonville, Florida

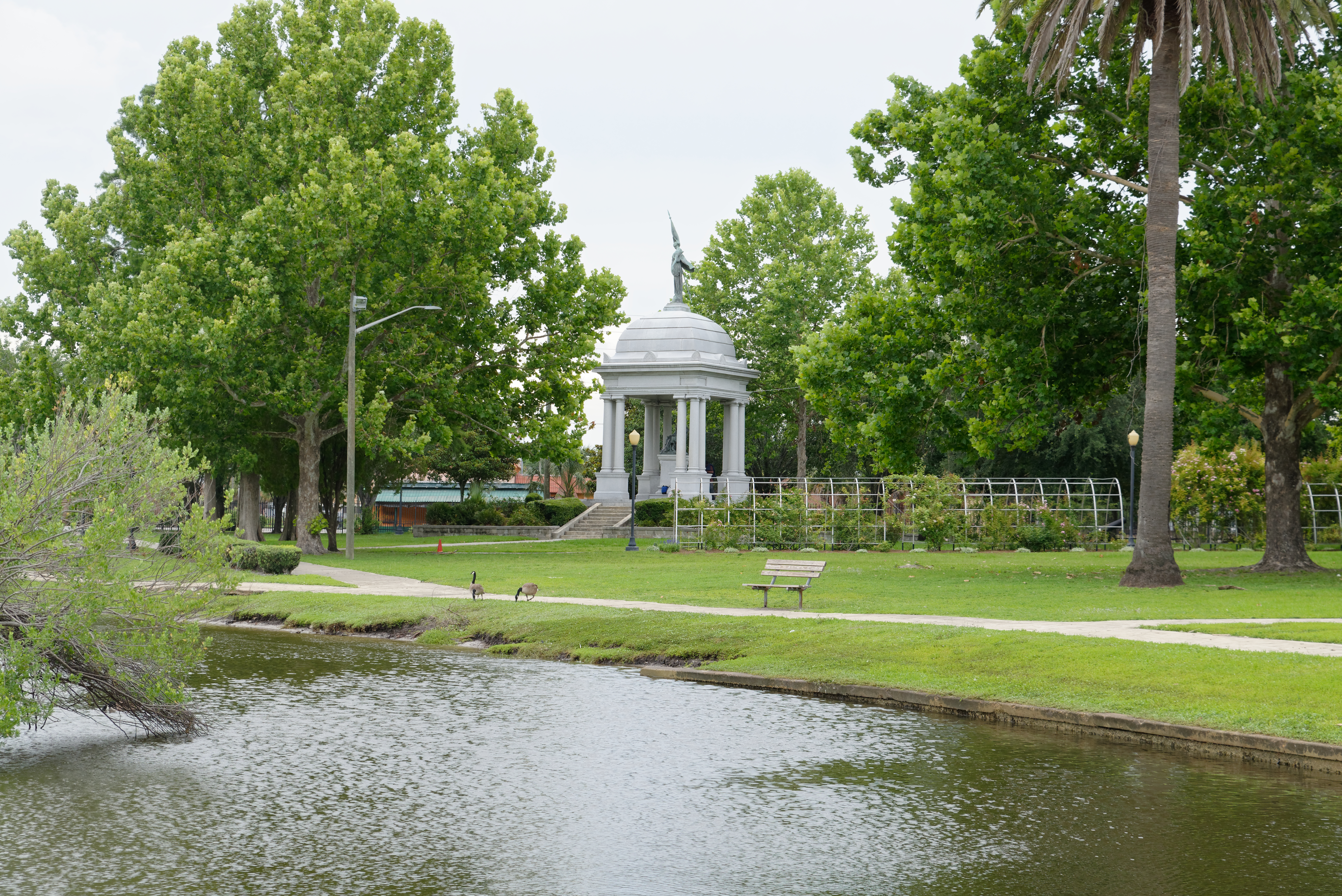
- Springfield Park
- Interactive map of Springfield Park
- Type: Municipal (Parks & Recreation Department)
- Location: Jacksonville, Florida
- Coordinates: 30°20′02″N 81°39′16″W
- Area: 6.01 acres (24,300 m^{2})
- Created: 1907
- Operator: City of Jacksonville
- Status: Open all year

Springfield Park (formerly Dignam Park until 1914, and then Confederate Park until 2020) is a public park in Jacksonville, Florida, on the southern bounds of the historic neighborhood of Springfield. It is part of a network of parks that parallel Hogan's Creek.

== History ==
Springfield Park was opened in 1907 as Dignam Park, named for a former chairman of the city's Board of Public Works. It was the first Jacksonville city park to include a playground. From opening until the Civil rights movement the park was open to whites only.

In 1914, Jacksonville hosted the annual reunion of the United Confederate Veterans, with estimated attendance of about 8,000 former Confederate soldiers. The UCV chose the park as the location for a new monument to honor the Women of the Southland, and five months after the reunion the city renamed the park "Confederate Park." Florida's Tribute to the Women of the Confederacy, a monument/statue, was erected in 1915.

On August 11, 2020, the Jacksonville City Council voted to change the name of the park to Springfield Park, after the name of the neighborhood it sits in.

The Springfield Park Playground, east of the park, was originally a part of Springfield Park, but was used for military training during World Wars I and II. It is now a dog park.

== Florida's Tribute to the Women of the Confederacy ==
The monument was designed in 1914 by sculptor Allen George Newman (1875–1940), and dedicated on October 26, 1915. Jno. Williams, Inc. served as the founder, and McNeel Marble Works served as the work's contractor. Its condition was deemed "treatment needed" by the Smithsonian Institution's "Save Outdoor Sculpture!" program in November 1992. As the inscription says, it was sponsored by the Florida Division of the United Confederate Veterans.

In May 2018, the monument was cited among those targeted by the March for Change, a three-day, 40-mile (64-km) protest against Confederate monuments located in Jacksonville and St. Augustine. It is No. 10 on the Make It Right Project's list of Confederate memorials it wants to see removed. On December 27, 2023, the monument was removed.

== Gallery ==
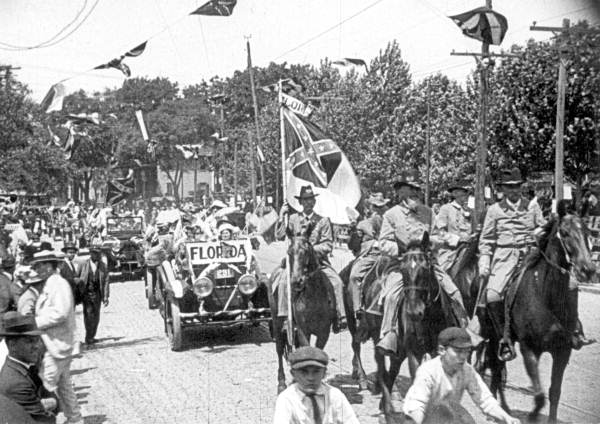
The 1914 reunion of the United Confederate Veterans in Jacksonville.

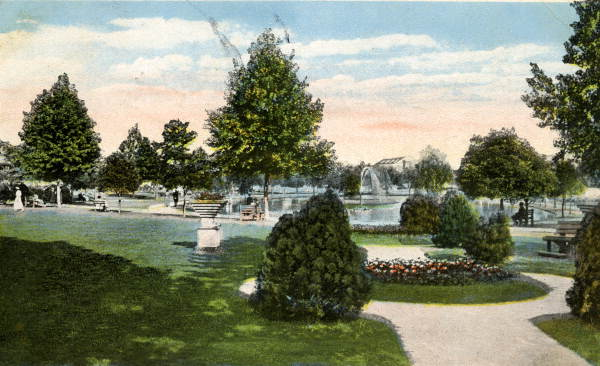
Postcard showing Confederate Park in 1918.

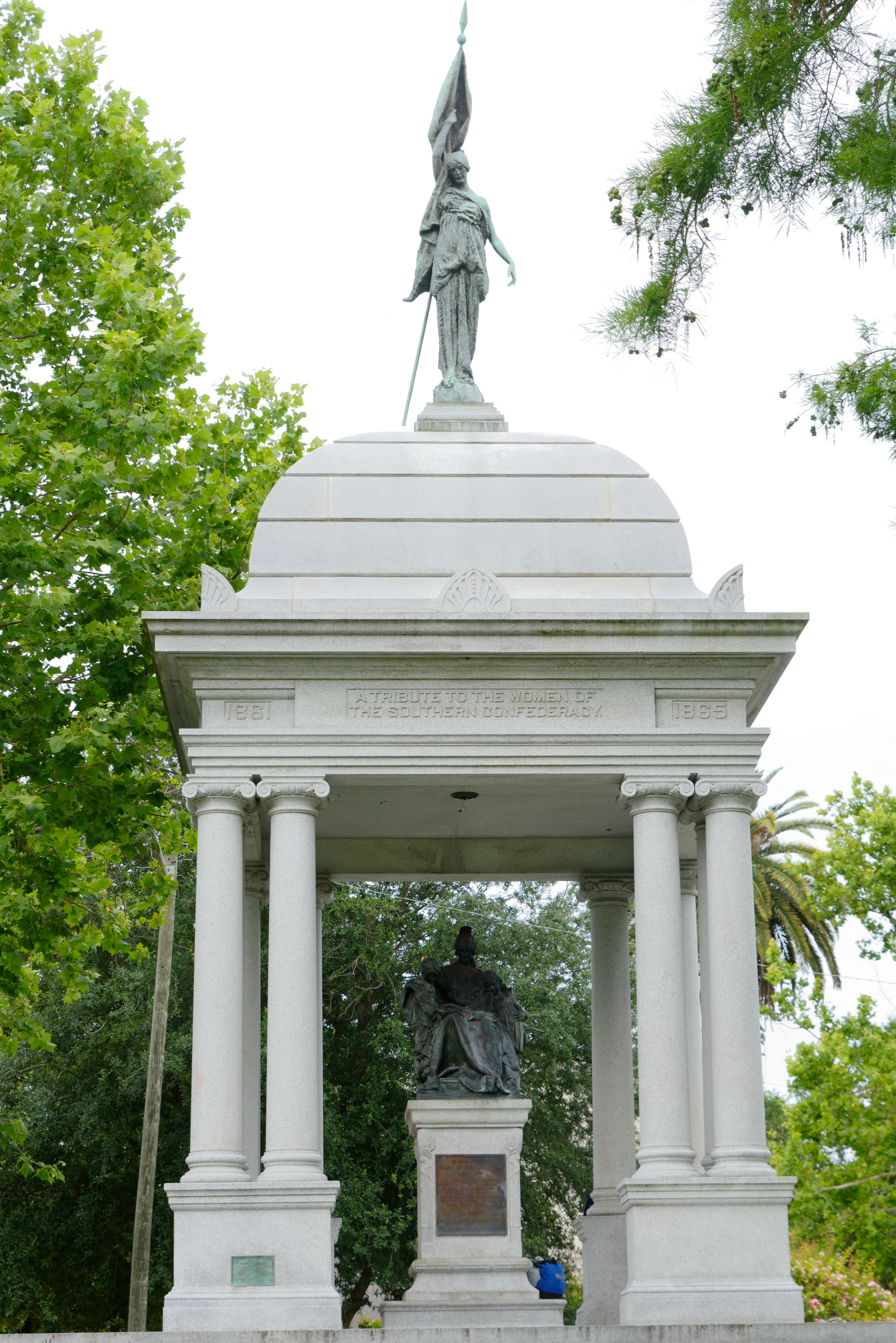
Florida's Tribute to the Women of the Confederacy

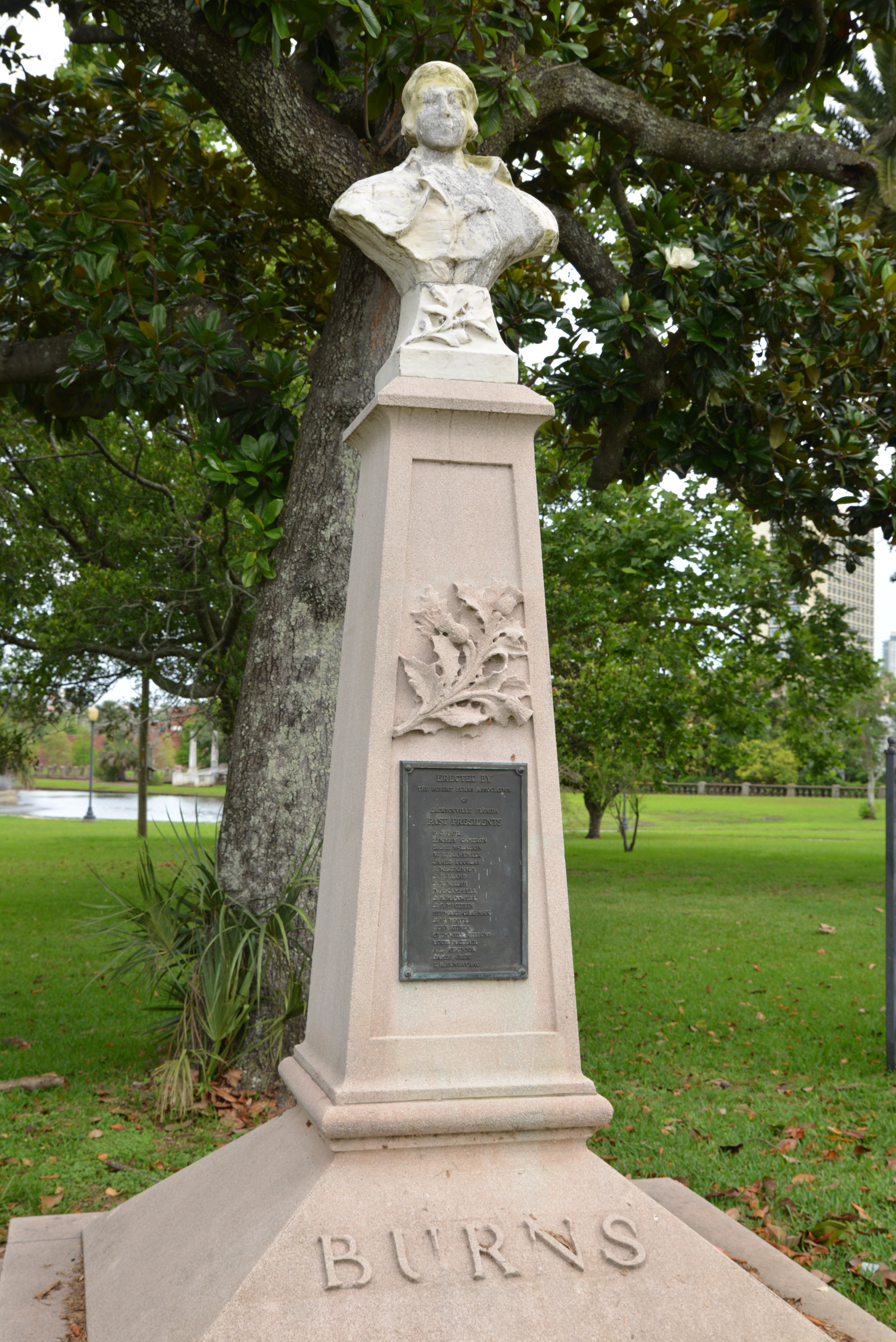
Memorial to Robert Burns

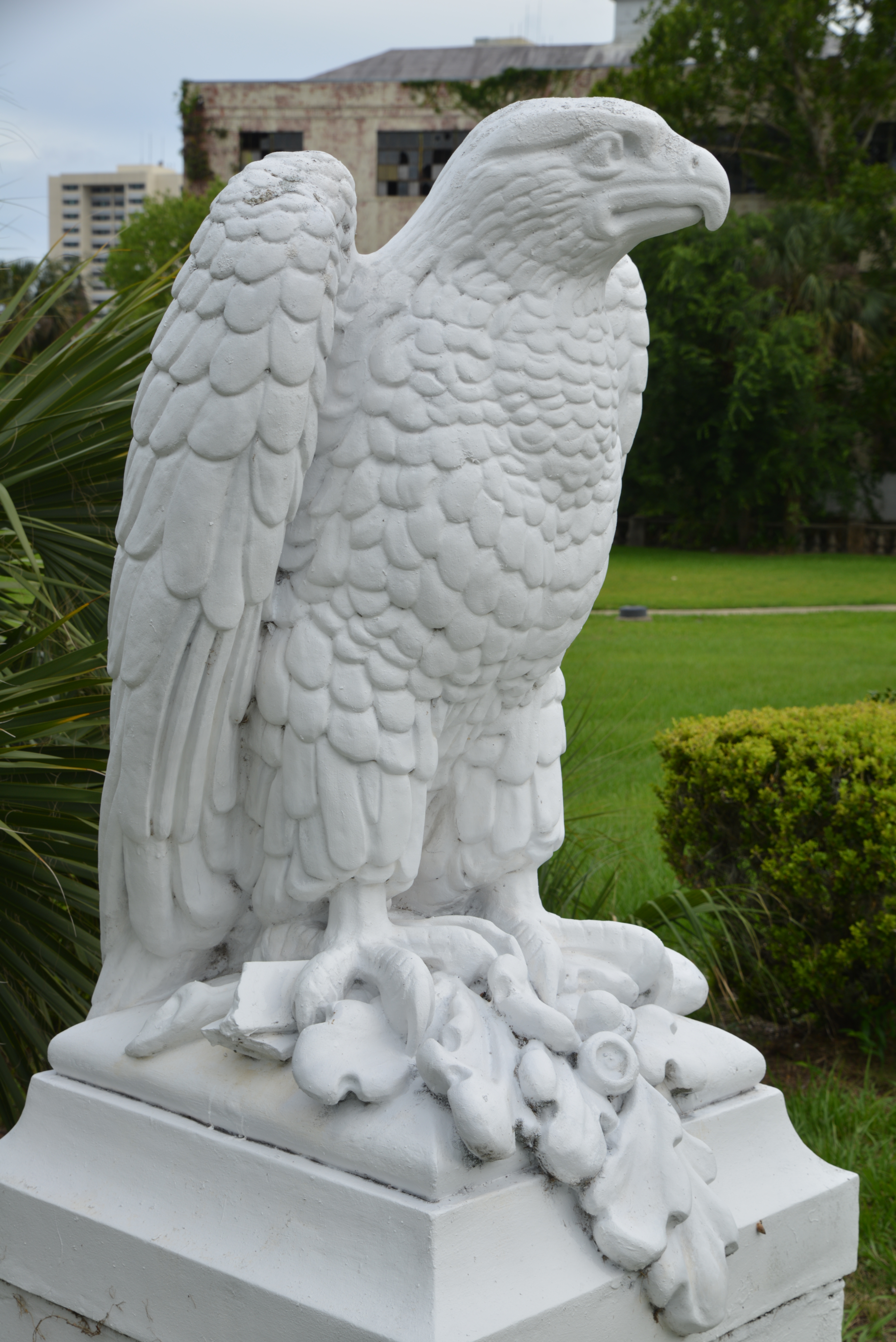
Eagle statue

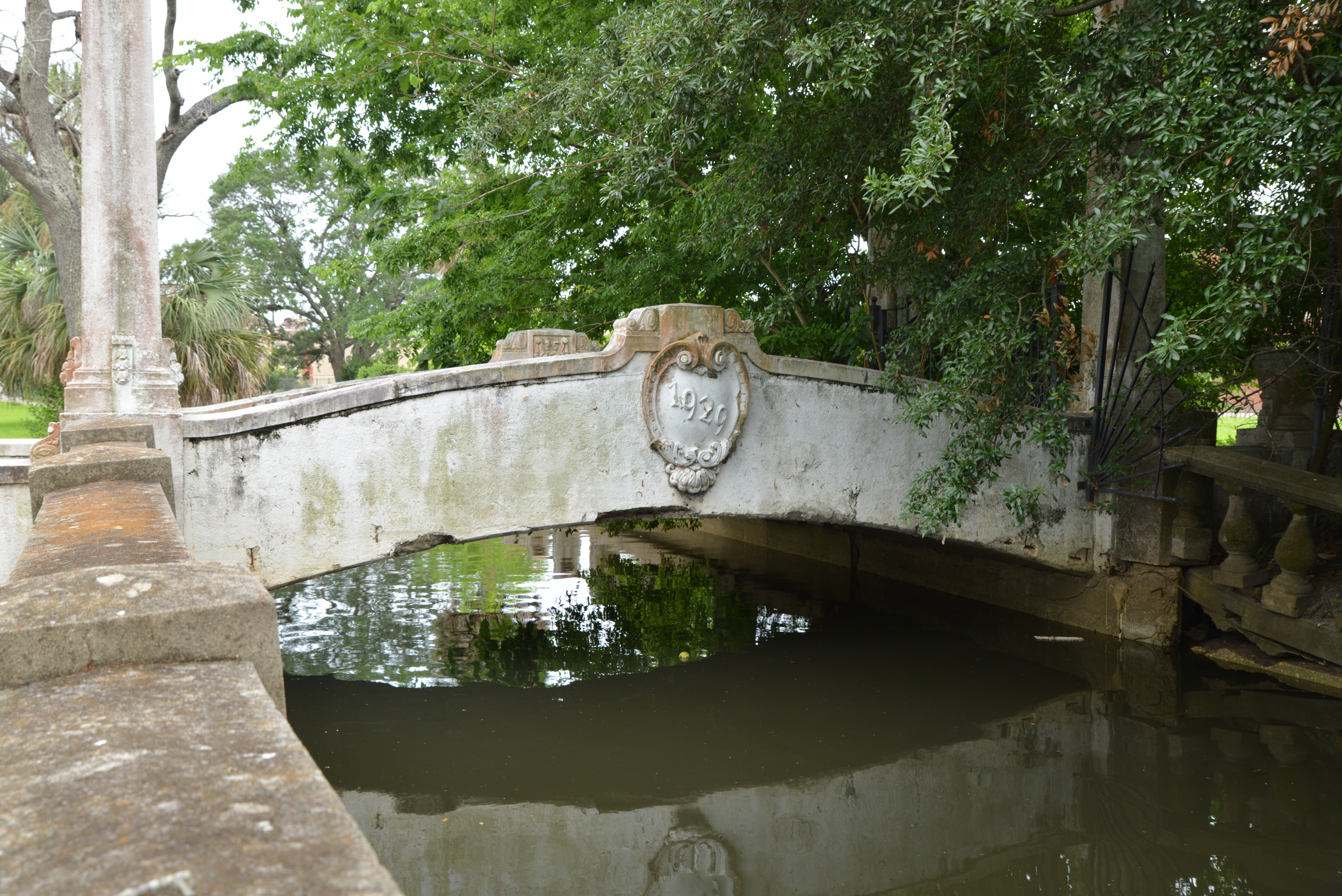
Bridge (1929)

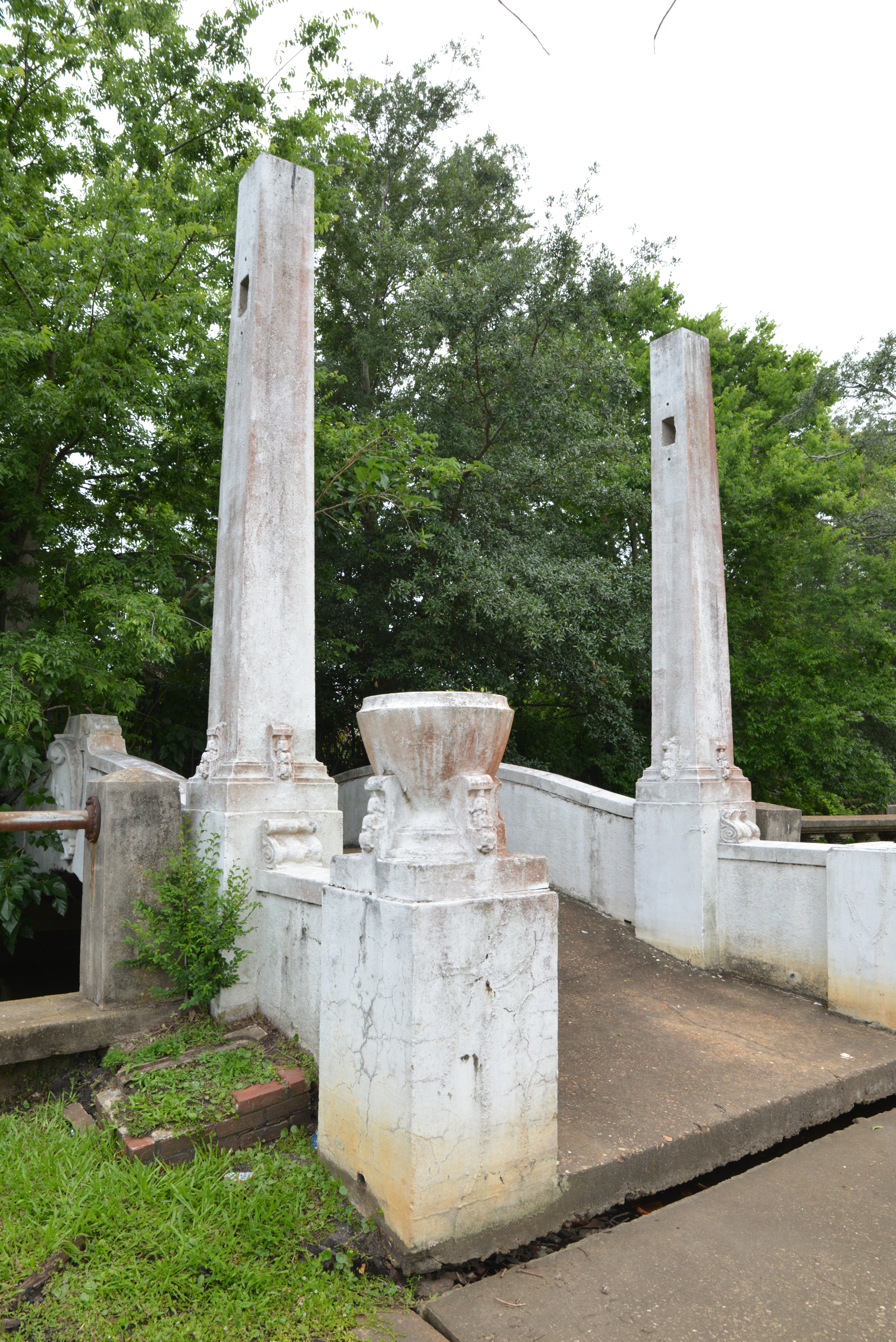
Entrance to bridge

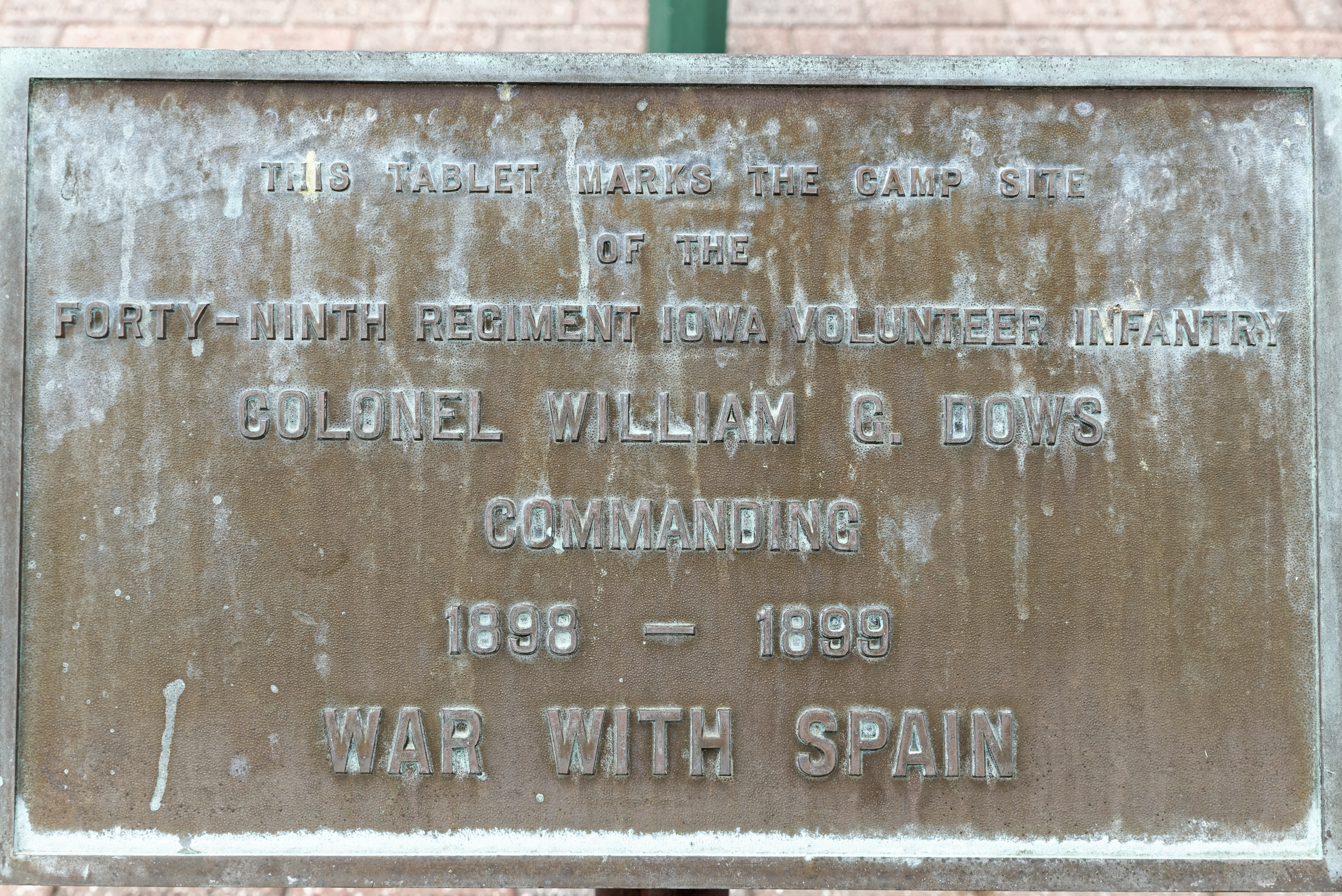
Plaque for Iowa regiment in the Spanish-American War
