= First Church of Christ, Scientist (Rock Island, Illinois) =

Church in Illinois, United States

- U.S. Historic district – Contributing property
- Rock Island Landmark
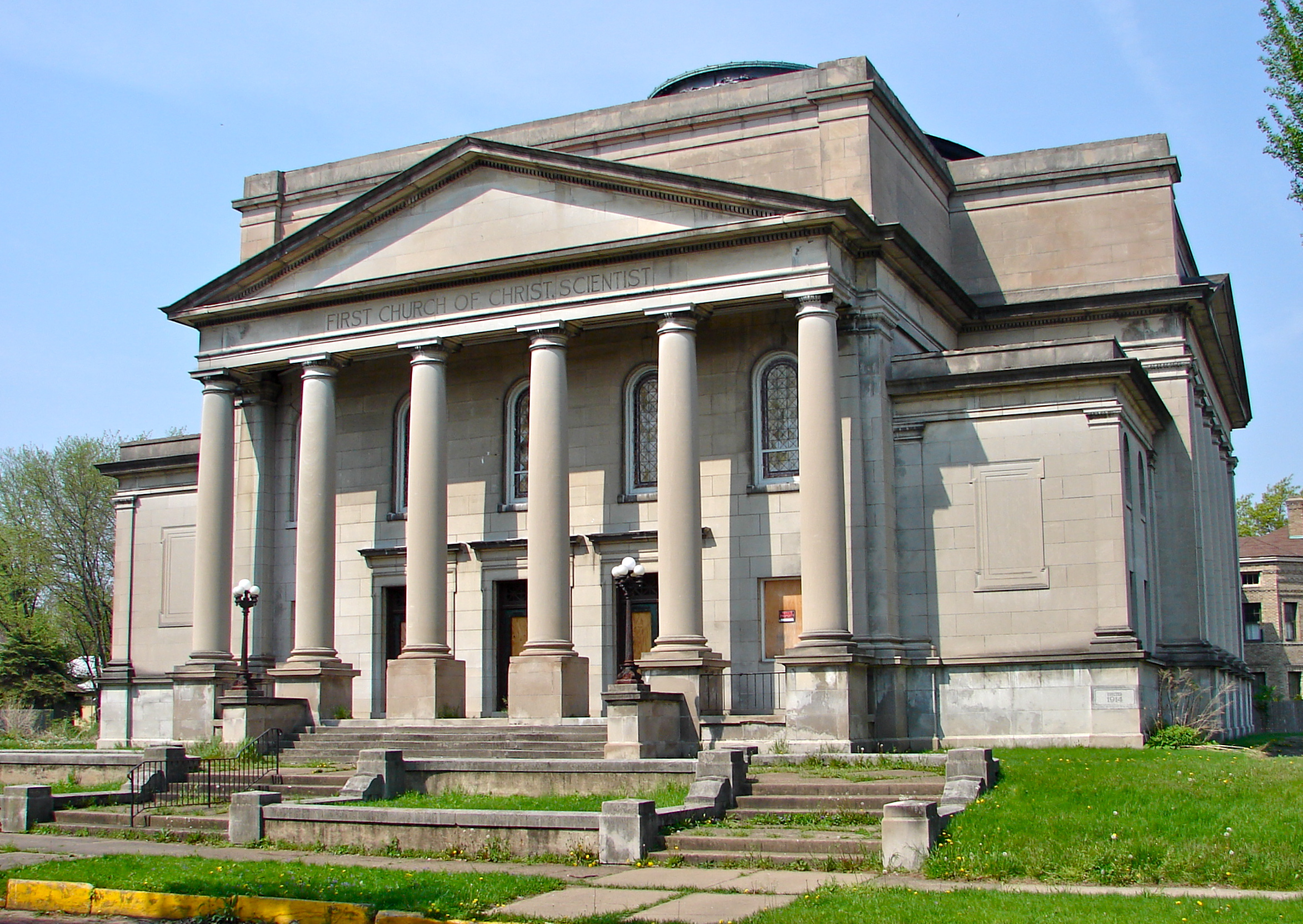

- Location within Illinois Location within the United States
- Location: 700 22nd Street; Rock Island, Illinois
- Coordinates: 41.5046°N 90.5696°W
- Built: 1914-1915
- Architect: William C. Jones
- Architectural style: Palladian, Classical Revival
- Part of: Broadway Historic District (ID98001046)

Significant dates
- Added to NRHP: August 14, 1998
- Designated RIL: 1993

The former First Church of Christ, Scientist, is an historic Christian Science church building located at 700 22nd Street, Rock Island, Illinois, United States. Designed by architect William C. Jones of Chicago in the Palladian style, it was built between 1914-1915. Its exterior walls are of brick covered by Bedford limestone. Its superimposed front portico is supported by six 2 story columns with egg-and-dart capitals. Its dome actually consists of 2 domes: an outer dome and an inner dome which are separated by a space for lighting fixtures and maintenance. The inner dome consists of some 8,000 colored fish scale glass panes on a wooden support structure. The inner dome is similar to the inner dome of First Church of Christ, Scientist in Kalamazoo, Michigan, which was designed by William C. Jones in 1913.

The church building, the second one built in Rock Island by the congregation, is a Rock Island Landmark as designated by the city in 1993. It is also a contributing property in the Broadway Historic District, which was added to the National Register of Historic Places on August 14, 1998. It is one of 4 churches in the district and the only Palladian building.

== History ==
The first Christian Science church that now is called the Quad Cities was First Church of Christ, Scientist, Davenport, Iowa. Due to the difficulty in traveling to Davenport, the Rock Island members of the Davenport church in 1895 began holding Friday night testimony meetings in rented halls in Rock Island, first at the Industrial Home Building at 3rd Avenue and 21st Street and then at the Swedish Baptist Church at 5th Avenue and 21st Street. In April 1896 they were held frequently on 23rd Street south of 8th Avenue and began construction of their own building which would seat 700 people. In October 1896, they formally withdrew from the Davenport church and organized First Church of Christ, Scientist, Rock Island, Illinois.

== Current status ==
First Church of Christ, Scientist, Rock Island, is no longer an active Christian Science church. The building was out of use for about 15 years before it was purchased by David and Marsha Karpeles in 2011. It is now a location for their Karpeles Manuscript Library Museum.
