= Eliezer Karpeles =

Eliezer Karpeles (1754, Prague – 27 April 1832, Libeň) was a Czech rabbi. For nearly forty years he was district rabbi of Kouřim, with residence at Libeň. Karpeles was the author of Me-Abne ha-Maḳom, novellæ, chiefly to Horayot and to some passages of Maimonides (Prague, 1801), and 'Erki 'Alai, notes to 'Arakin and Hullin (ib. 1815).

== See also ==
- Karpeles
