= Alfred Klaar =

Austrian writer (1848–1927)

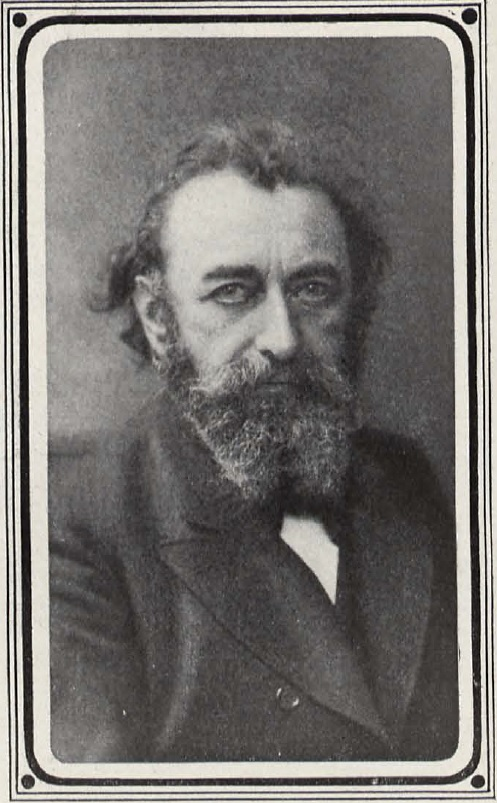
- Photograph of Klaar in 1905
- Born: 7 November 1848; Prague, Bohemia, Austrian Empire
- Died: 4 November 1927 (aged 78); Charlottenburg, Berlin, Weimar Republic
- Occupation: Writer

Alfred Klaar (7 November 1848 – 4 November 1927) was a Czech writer and theater critic.

== Biography ==
Alfred Klaar was born as Aaron Karpeles on 7 November 1848 in Prague, Bohemia, Austrian Empire. He was born into a Jewish family, but converted to Catholicism and changed his name in 1887.

After attending the Piarist Gymnasium in Prague, he studied German and law there and in Vienna. In 1868, he became the assistant editor of the Tagasbote aus Böhmen, and in 1873, he became an art and theater critic for the German-speaking newspaper Bohemia and an editor for Morgenblatt aus Böhmen.

In 1885, Klaar was made Privatdozent in German literature at the German Technical High School in Prague. There, he studied the works of Franz Grillparzer and earned his doctorate in Leipzig with a thesis about Grillparzer's King Ottocar: His Rise and Fall.

Throughout his journalistic career, Klaar was a strong critic of fellow journalist and critic Alfred Kerr, becoming a spokesperson for German and liberal sentiments in Bohemia.

In July 1899, Klaar moved to Berlin with his wife, Paula Eberty (1869–1929). In Berlin, he became a theater editor for the Berliner Neueste Nachrichten [de]. Sometime after 1912, he took over as the editor-in-chief of the Sunday print of the Vossiche Zeitung.

Klaar was also a lecturer at Berlin's Charlottenburg Technical University and was chairman of the Association of Berlin Theater Critics, founded in 1913. He was also a freelance contributor to the Neue Freie Presse in Vienna.

Klaar died on 4 November 1927 in Charlottenburg, Berlin, Weimar Republic.

== Publications ==
- Die Litteratur des Auslandes (1873)
- Jos. Victor Scheffel (1876)
- Fahrende Komödianten (1876)
- Joseph II (c.1880)
- Das Moderne Drama, Dargestellt in Seinen Richtungen und Hauptvertretern (1883–84)
- Der Empfang (1888)
- Diskretion (c.1890)
- Wer Schimpft der Kauft (c.1890)
- Franz Grillparzer als Dramatiker (1891)
- F. Schmeykal (c.1894)
- Börne's Leben und Wirken (c.1899)
- Der Faustcyclus (c.1899)
