= Broadway Historic District (Rock Island, Illinois) =

Historic district in Illinois, United States

- U.S. National Register of Historic Places
- U.S. Historic district
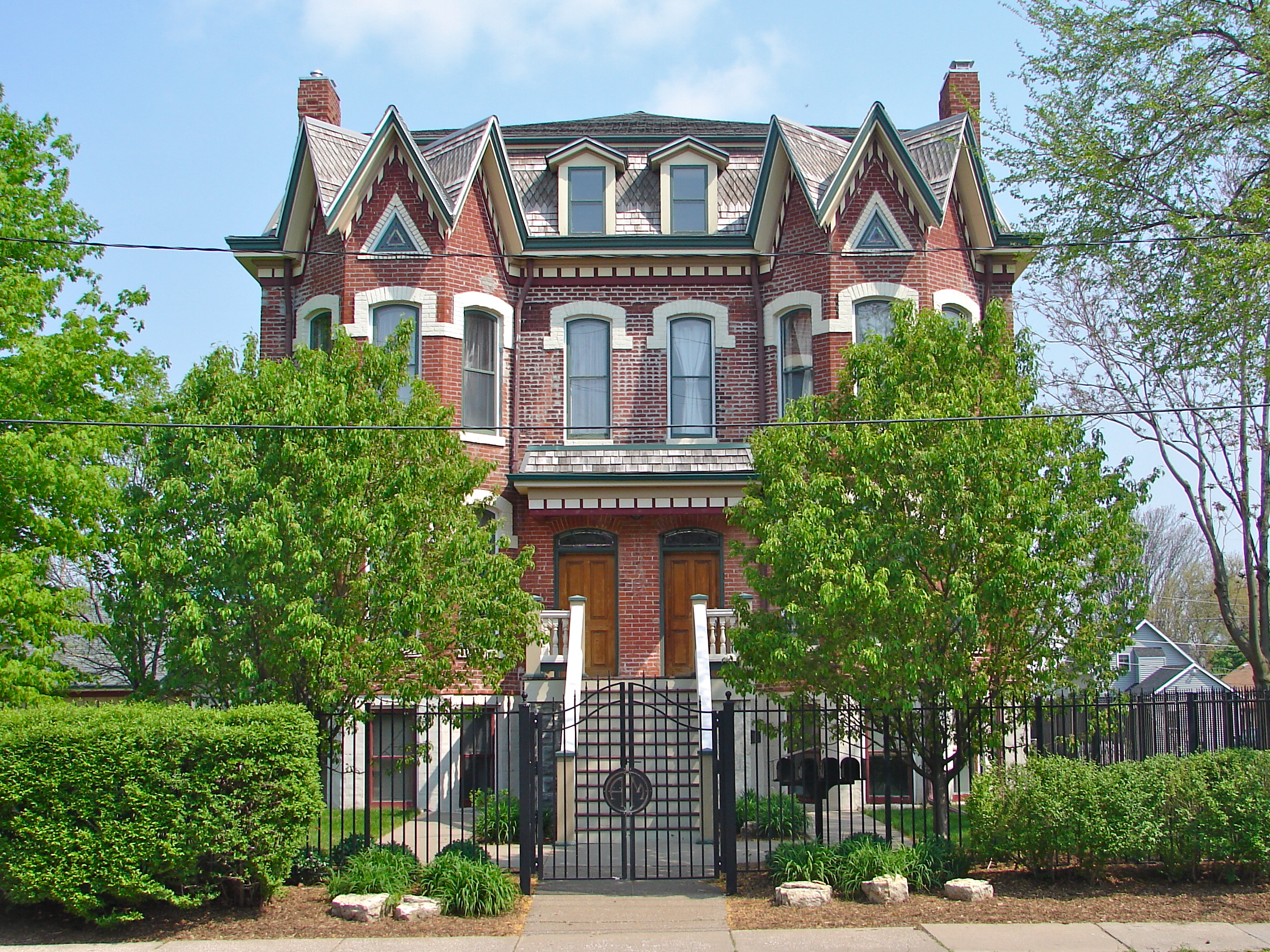
- House at 22nd St. and 7th Avenue

- Location within Illinois Location within the United States
- Location: Roughly bounded by 17th and 23rd Sts., 5th and 7th Aves., Lincoln Court, and 12th and 13th Aves., Rock Island, Illinois
- Coordinates: 41°30′8″N 90°34′18″W
- Architect: Leonard M. Drack; et al.
- Architectural style: Queen Anne; Colonial Revival; Italianate
- NRHP reference No.: 98001046
- Added to NRHP: August 14, 1998

Broadway Historic District is a nationally recognized historic district and neighborhood in Rock Island, Illinois, United States. It is roughly bounded by 17th and 23rd street, 5th and 7th avenues, Lincoln Court, and 12th and 13th avenues. Containing more than 550 Victorian homes as well as other buildings, it is known for its Great Unveiling program, which encourages the removal of artificial siding from historic houses.

On August 14, 1998, it was added to the National Register of Historic Places.

== Contributing properties ==
Contributing properties in the district include:

- Connor House
- First Church of Christ, Scientist
- Lincoln School
- Potter House
- Robert Wagner House
