= Springfield, Jacksonville =

Neighborhood of Jacksonville, Florida

Springfield
- Neighborhood of Jacksonville
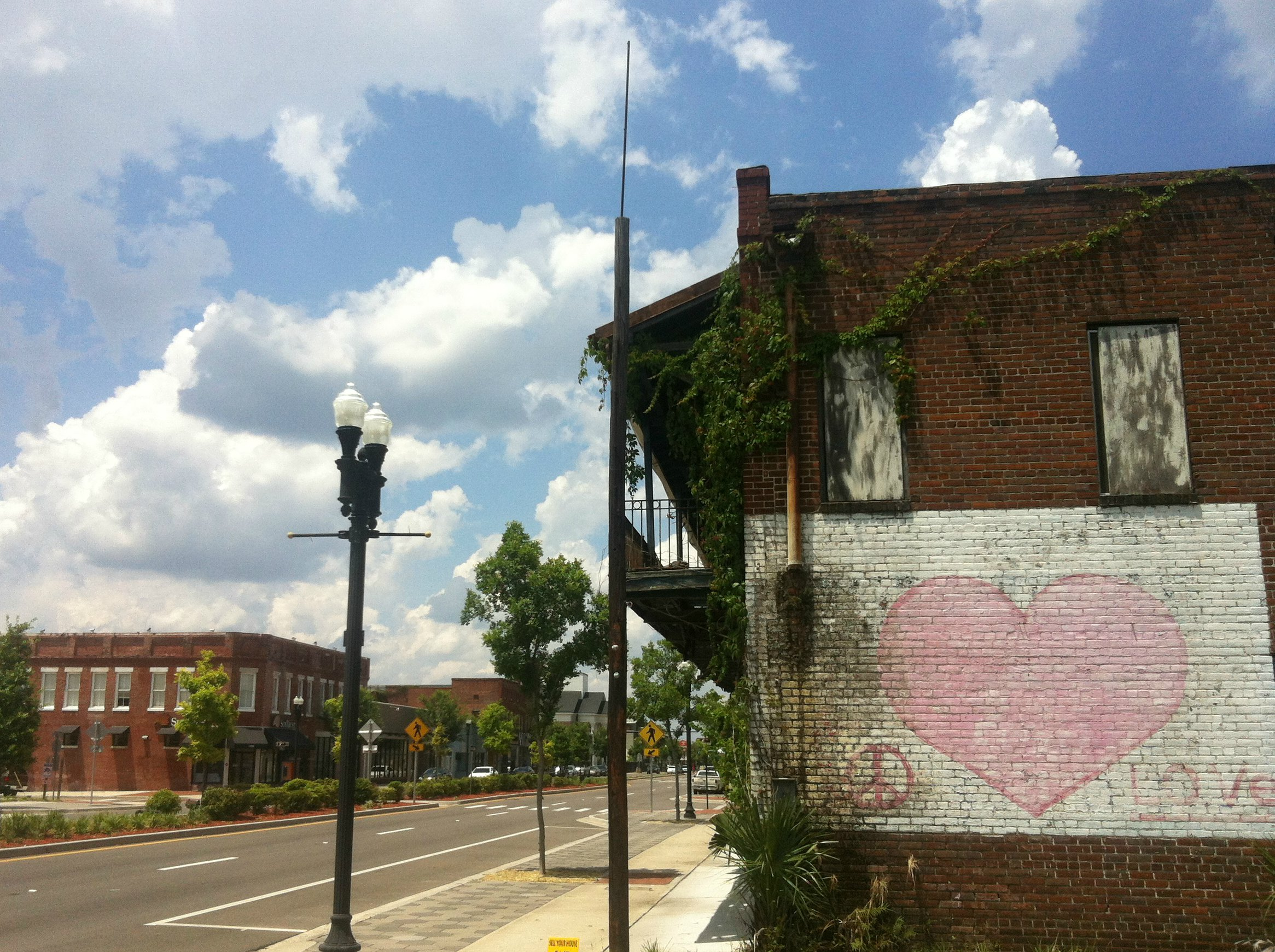
- Main Street, near the intersection of 7th Street.

- Springfield neighborhood is shaded

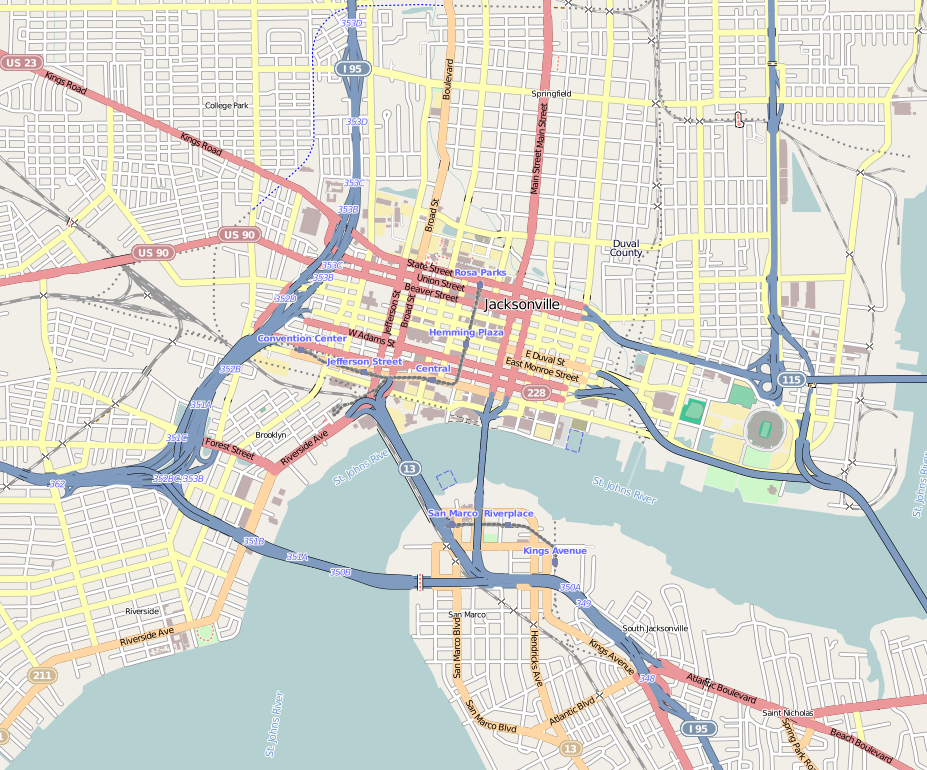
- Location within Central Jacksonville
- Coordinates: 30°20′39.9″N 81°39′18.8″W

Government
  - City Council: Jimmy Peluso (D)
  - State Assembly: Kimberly Daniels (D)
  - State Senate: Jennifer Bradley (R)
  - U.S. House: Aaron Bean (R)

Area
  - Total: 2.53 km^{2} (0.978 sq mi)
  - Land: 2.53 km^{2} (0.978 sq mi)

Population (2008)
  - Total: 4,674
  - Density: 1,850/km^{2} (4,780/sq mi)
- ZIP Code: 32206
- Area code(s): 904, 324
- Website: myspringfield.org
- Springfield Historic District
- U.S. National Register of Historic Places
- U.S. Historic district
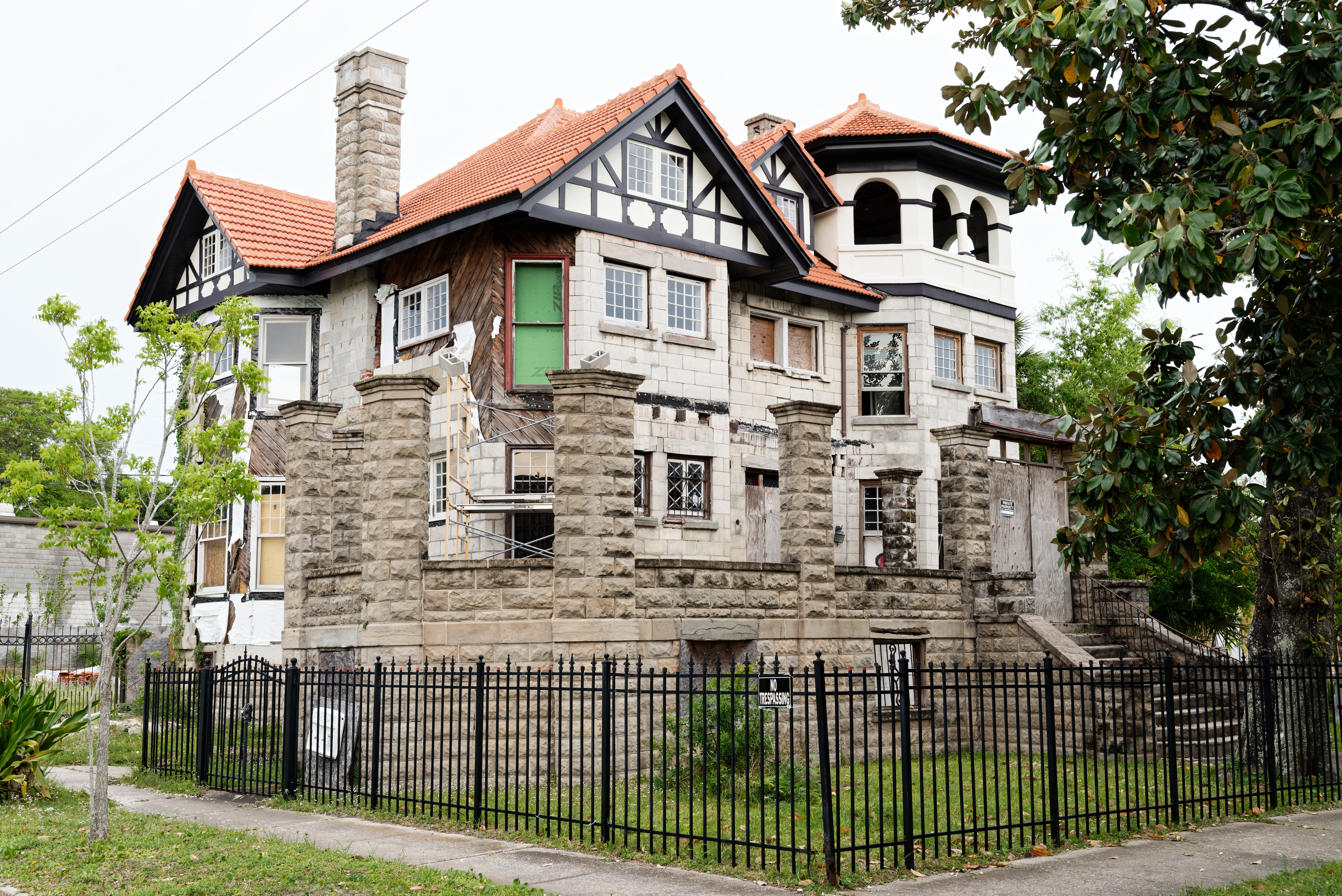
- Corner of Third and Pearl
- Location: Jacksonville, Florida, US
- Built: 1880s through 1920s
- Architectural style: Late 19th- and 20th-century revivals Prairie School; Colonial Revival; Queen Anne
- NRHP reference No.: 86003640
- Added to NRHP: January 22, 1987

Springfield is a historic neighborhood of Jacksonville, Florida, United States, located to the north of downtown. Established in 1869, it experienced its greatest growth from the early 1880s through the 1920s. The Springfield Historic District is listed in the National Register of Historic Places, and contains some of the city's best examples of 19th and early 20th century architecture.

== Geography ==
The boundaries of Springfield are well defined. Hogan's Creek lies along its south edge, and railroad lines are found on the north and east. Boulevard defines the western limit of the district where a later commercial strip abuts the earlier residential area. Contemporary with the overall residential area are two commercial strips along Main and Eighth Streets which join at the heart of the district. The district contains 119 city blocks in an area of approximately 500 acres (2 km^{2}), or slightly less than one square mile. Hogan's Creek separates the residences of Springfield from the downtown business district. North of the creek few buildings rise above two stories and parks and tree lined streets are common.

The blocks of the historic district are laid out in a regular grid, with named streets running north and south and numbered streets east and west. Most of the blocks have alleys, usually arranged in an "H" pattern, although other configurations are found. A few streets retain their original brick pavers and granite curbstones, but the majority are now covered with asphalt and have concrete curbs. Sidewalks feature both the earlier hexagonal pavers and modern poured concrete sections. Trees lend considerable distinction to the neighborhood. Oaks predominate. Scattered throughout the neighborhood are such decorative elements as hitching posts, cast iron fences, rusticated concrete block walls, and carriage stepping stones, testimony to the area's turn-of-the-century origins. There is, however, no great concentration of such elements.

== History ==
Springfield was established as a residential community in 1871 by developer John H. Norton. Its concentrated physical development began about 1882 with the formation of the Springfield Development Company and accelerated after a fire that destroyed much of downtown Jacksonville in 1901. The Great Fire of 1901 consumed much of central Jacksonville, leaving many of the city's most prominent and wealthy citizens homeless. Smoke from the fire was reportedly so heavy it could be seen as far away as North Carolina. The fire lasted 8 hours and consumed 146 city blocks, 3268 buildings, and killed seven people. After the fire, many of the Jacksonville's residents who lost homes in the fire relocated to Springfield.

Contributing buildings in the district date from about 1885 to approximately 1930. The majority of the houses are wood frame vernacular structures, but there are some examples of late 19th century revival and romantic styles, including Queen Anne, Colonial Revival, and the Stick style. 20th century types include Prairie School, Bungalow, and Mediterranean. The neighborhood did not experience a resurgence of construction during the 1920s, as did other residential sections of the city, and the "boom" bypassed the area since much of the land was already occupied, except in the area north of Eighth Street. Construction was, therefore, limited to the occasional vacant lot or those sites where older structures had been lost or required replacement.

At the time the district was listed in the National Register, it contained 1,784 buildings fifty years old or older that contributed to its historical character. Of that number, 1,686 were classified as residential. Only 48 were commercial. The great majority of buildings, 1,595, were wood frame, and 201 were masonry. There were 1,294 buildings of two stories in height and 10 three-story structures. The remainder were all one-story structures.

The January 2010 issue of Southern Living magazine spotlights Springfield as the #1 "comeback" neighborhood in the South, noting significant improvement over the past decade. The December 2010 issue of Florida Trend Magazine also featured the Springfield Historic District in an article titled "A Life of Its Own". The piece detailed how, despite the down housing market, the neighborhood has continued to thrive.

Recently, the neighborhood has experienced renewed interest from developers; two brewery projects have been announced for the area, as well as two restaurants and a Walgreens community pharmacy, in 2016 alone.

== Features ==
The Hogan's Creek Park System is one of the most notable features of Springfield. These historic parks and structures which define the southern boundary of the neighborhood constitute 30.91 acres (125,100 m^{2}) of Springfield or approximately five percent of the total land area. Klutho Park comprises 17.47 acres (70,700 m^{2}) and Springfield Park another 8.3 acres (34,000 m^{2}). Along the creek itself are the balustrades and bridges designed by Henry John Klutho in 1929. Klutho was Jacksonville's most influential architect during the first years of the twentieth century and its leading proponent of the Prairie School. The house he designed for himself in Springfield was said to be the first in Florida to draw on the "modernist" architectural movements in America.

Springfield is composed mainly of wood frame residential buildings and a much smaller number of masonry commercial, religious, educational, and civic structures. There were 1,038 frame vernacular buildings in the historic district that possessed no discernible stylistic features, though in certain cases the decorative details may have been removed in later remodeling. Most of these vernacular buildings are two stories in height with a gable or hip roof. The wood-frame buildings that retain their original fabric are generally clad with weatherboard or novelty siding or, in a few cases, wood shingles. In many cases, aluminum, vinyl, or asbestos siding have been applied to the exterior of houses. One-story porches and verandas are common, and there are some porches with upper galleries. There are a variety of sash and casement window types. Masonry vernacular buildings are generally brick or stuccoed and are either one or two stories in height. Most of these are commercial buildings with fixed glass storefronts. Few exhibit any ornamentation. Their roofs are usually the flat built-up variety with parapets on the street facade.

Some additional commercial and industrial buildings are found along the northern and eastern boundaries of the district in conjunction with the railroad lines, and isolated commercial structures are found within the neighborhood. Schools, churches, multi-family residences and parks are found throughout the neighborhood. Although there are a number of modern intrusions along Springfield's main commercial arteries, these have not proved so numerous as to be overwhelming. Also, except for demolitions, the residential area remains largely unchanged, with relatively little post-1930 construction. Contributing buildings were all fifty years old or older and retained enough of their original physical character to adequately embody the sense of time, place, and historic association normally required in establishing a historic district. These comprised 95 percent of all of the buildings in the district. The non-contributing buildings were either less than fifty years old and lacked exceptional significance or were more than fifty years old but retained little, if any, of their original physical integrity. These numbered five percent of the total.

== See also ==
- Karpeles Manuscript Library Museum

== Gallery ==
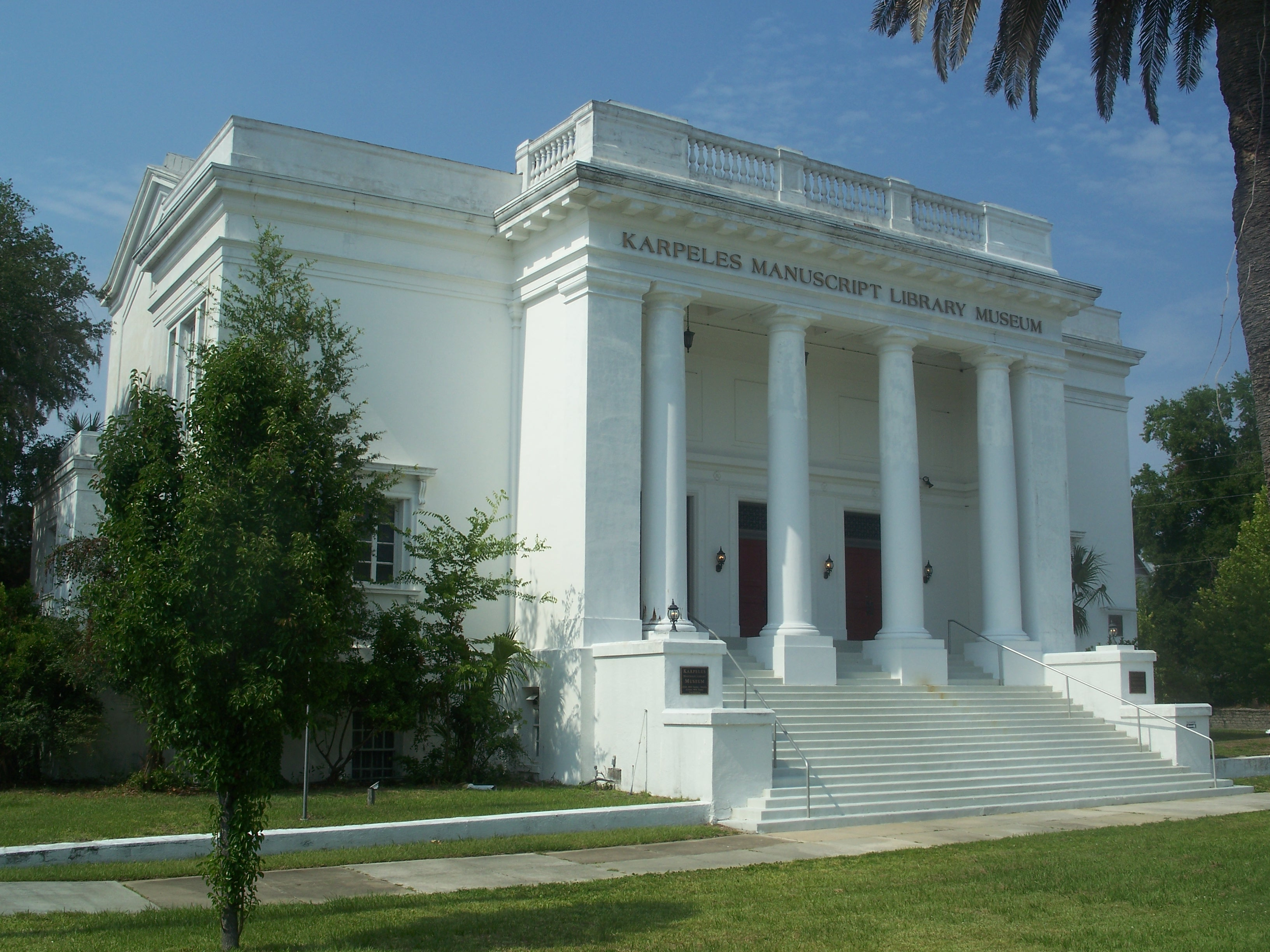
Karpeles Manuscript Library Museum

Residence

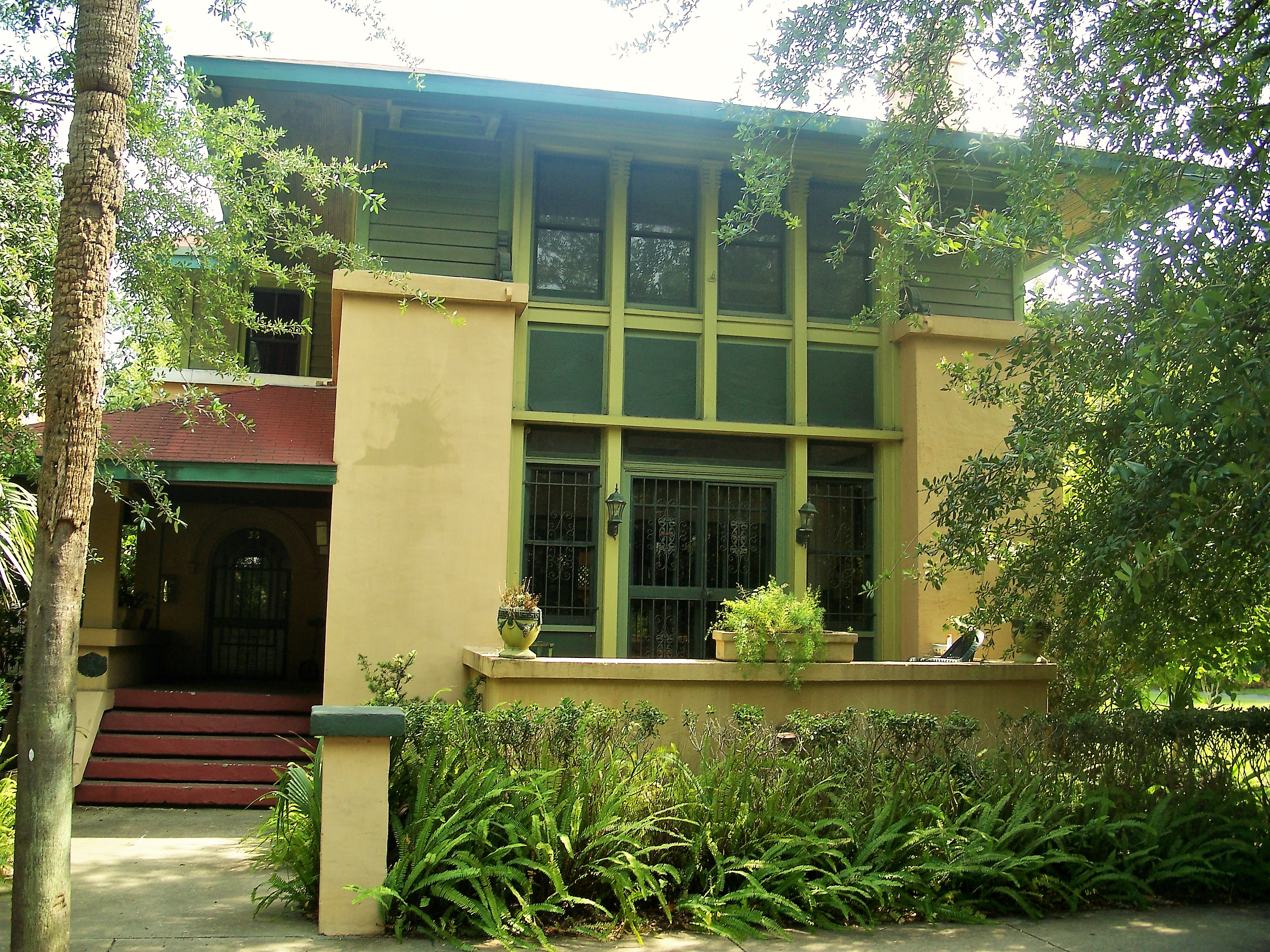
Henry John Klutho House

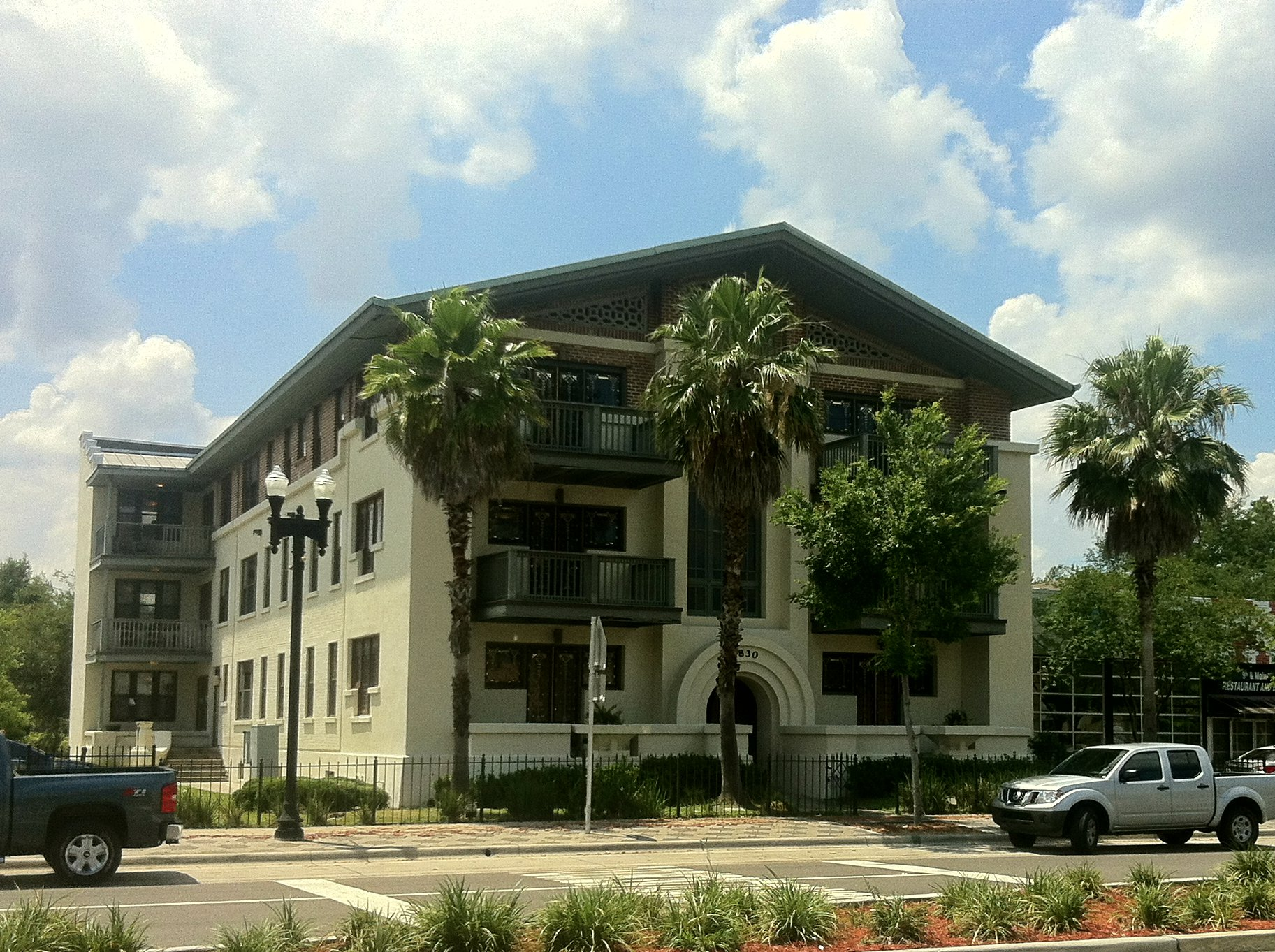
Klutho Apartments

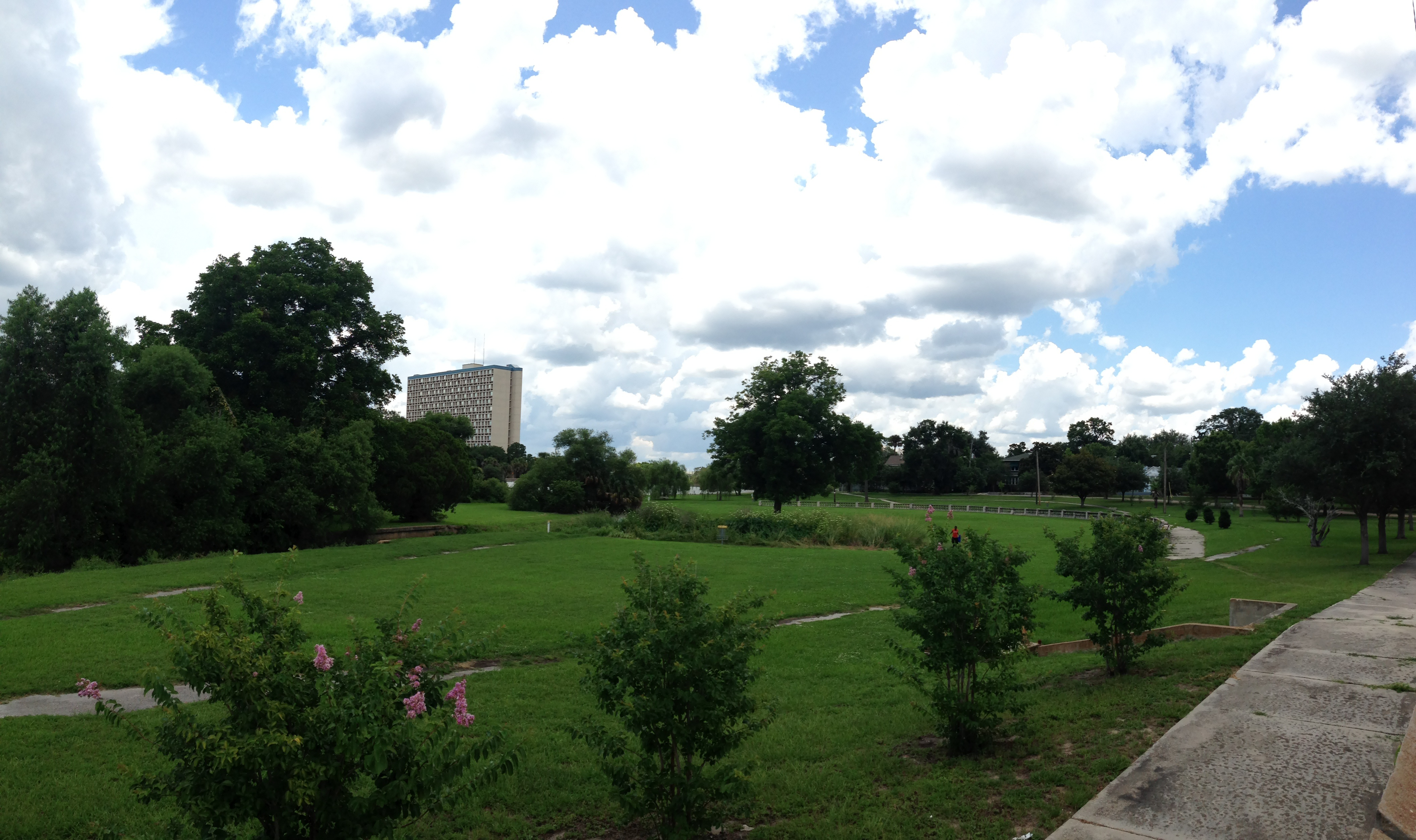
Klutho Park

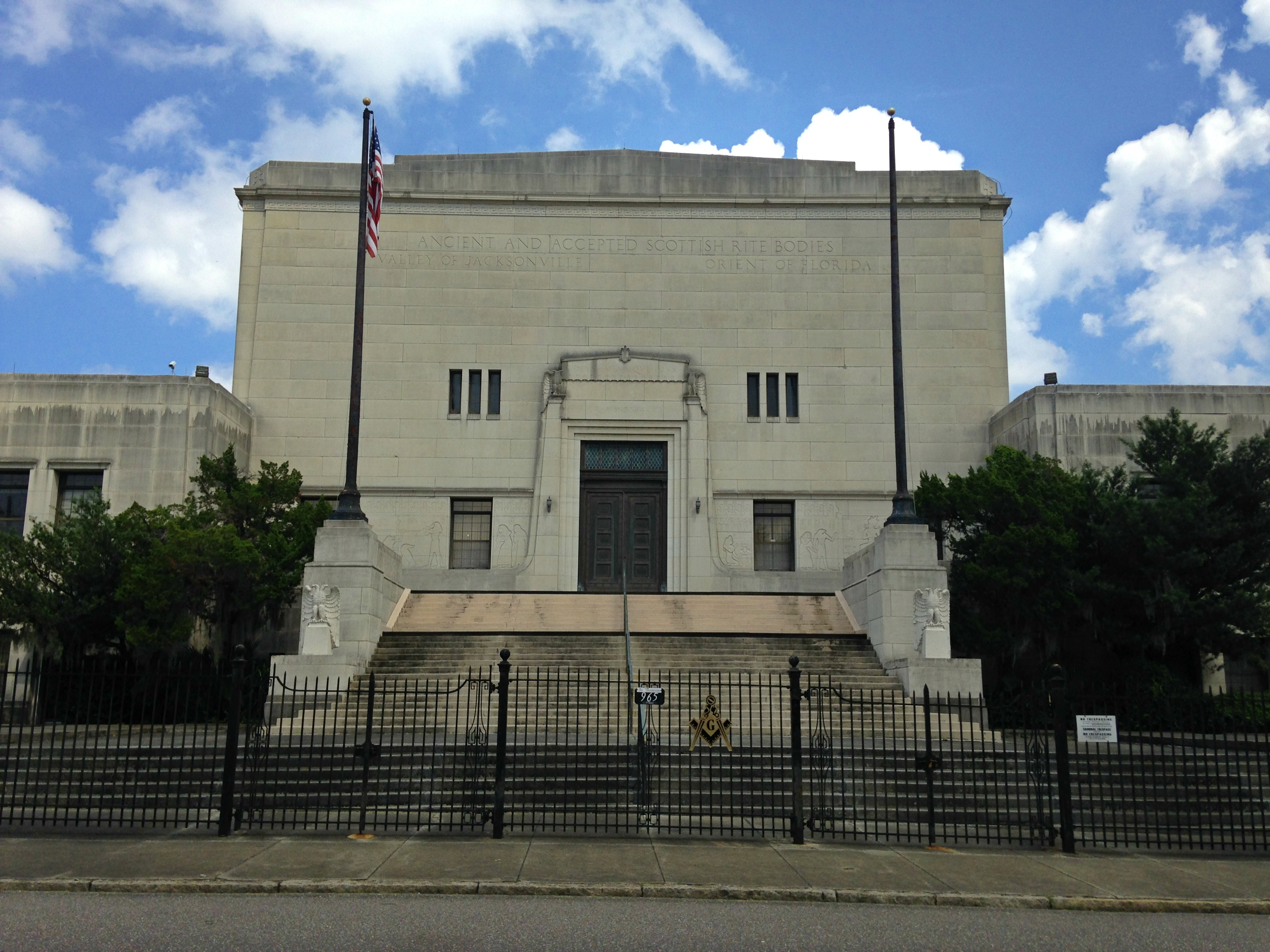
Scottish Rite Masonic Center

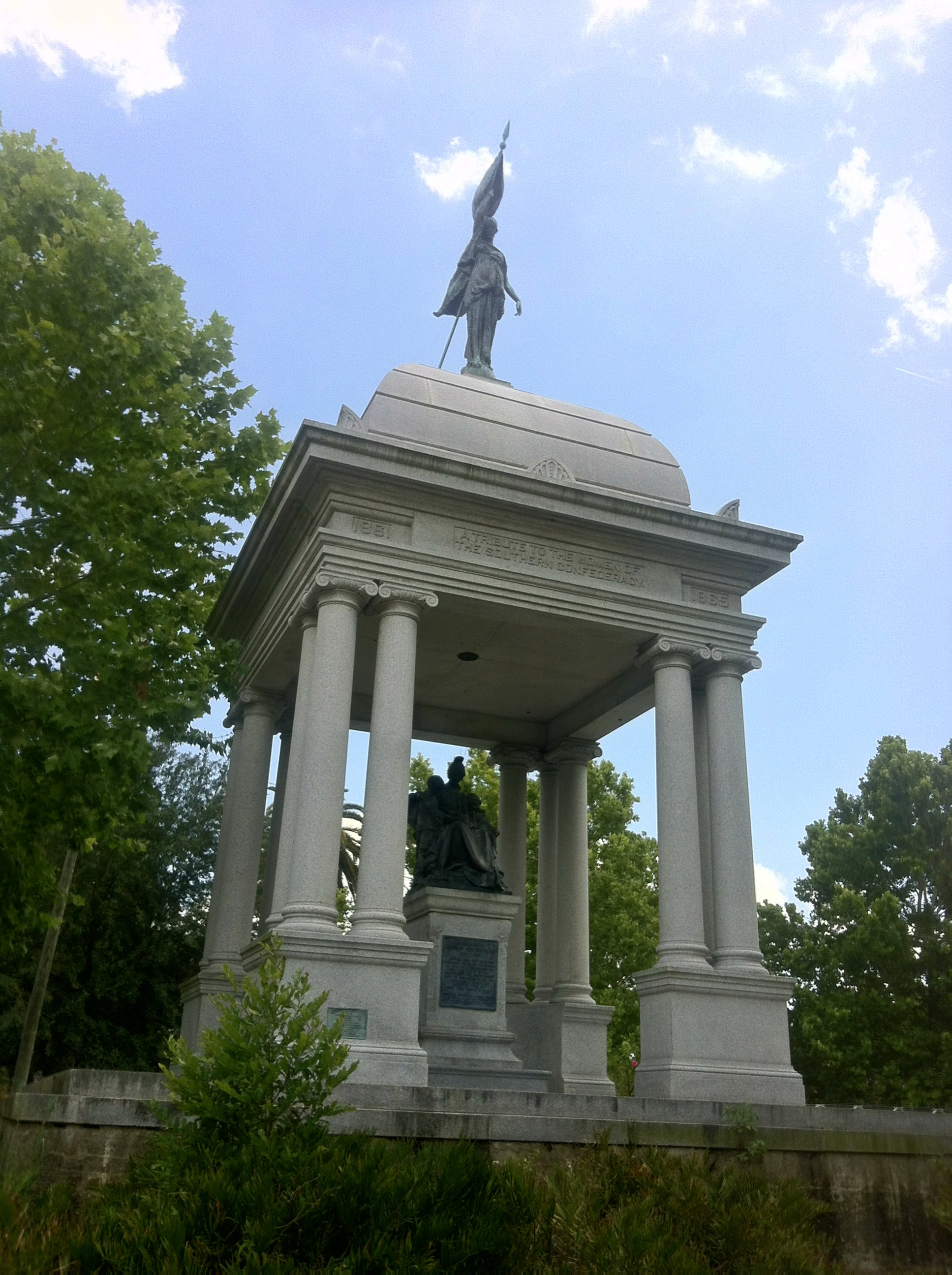
Springfield Park
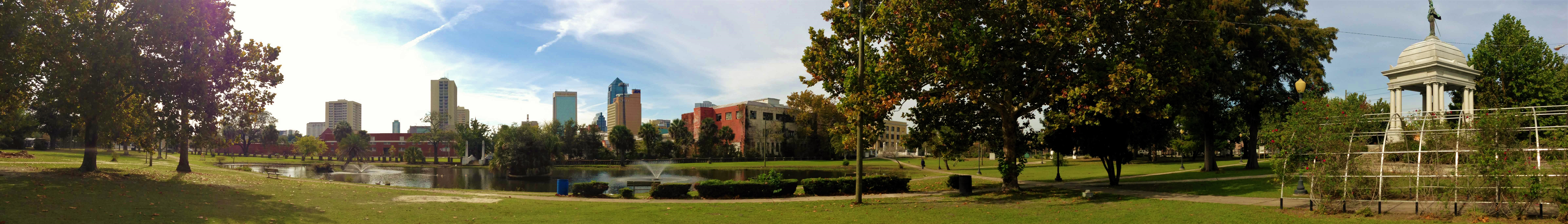
Panorama of Downtown Jacksonville taken from Springfield Park, located in Springfield.
