= David Karpeles =

American philanthropist

David Karpeles (January 26, 1936 - January 19, 2022) was a mathematician and philanthropist best known as the namesake of the Karpeles Manuscript Library Museums.

== Biography ==
David Karpeles was born in Santa Barbara, California in 1936 at Santa Barbara Cottage Hospital. He graduated from the University of Minnesota with a degree in mathematics and physics.

Karpeles began investing in real estate in 1968, and was known for offering financing options so tenants could become home-owners, for which in 1981 he was recognized by then-Governor of California Jerry Brown with an affordable housing competition award. His success in the real estate market allowed him to begin his collection of rare documents in 1977.

Karpeles became known for the sixteen museums which are named after him, the Karpeles Manuscript Library Museums, which contain documents related to topics such as literature, science, religion, political history, music, exploration, and art. In total, the over one million manuscripts in the collection are estimated to be worth $1 billion.

Karpeles died on January 19, 2022.
