= List of University of Pittsburgh buildings =

The lists of University of Pittsburgh (Pitt) and University of Pittsburgh Medical Center (UPMC) buildings catalog only the currently-existing Pitt- and UPMC-owned buildings and structures (Note: Ownership was confirmed by the Allegheny County Assessment on-line real-estate database. Because state funding has been used to finance some of the University's capital projects, the Commonwealth of Pennsylvania is sometimes listed as the holder of the deed to some University of Pittsburgh properties although they are controlled and operated by the University. Buildings leased, but no owned, by Pitt or UPMC are not included in the tables.) that reside within the City of Pittsburgh, Pennsylvania, the home of the university's and medical center's main campuses. Although the university and the closely affiliated University of Pittsburgh Medical Center (UPMC) are tightly intertwined both institutionally and geographically, including the sharing and leasing arrangements of resources and facilities (such as Forbes Tower, Thomas Detre Hall, the Carrillo Street Steam Plant, Hillman Cancer Center, etc.), buildings primarily owned by UPMC are listed separately because the university and UPMC are technically separate legal entities.

== University of Pittsburgh ==
The major concentration of buildings that comprise Pitt's main campus is centered in the Oakland neighborhood of Pittsburgh, however a few facilities are scattered elsewhere throughout the city, including the adjacent Shadyside neighborhood. Along with regional campuses in Bradford, Greensburg, Johnstown, and Titusville, Pitt also has a Computer Center in RIDC Park in Blawnox, the Plum Boro Science Center in Plum, the University of Pittsburgh Applied Research Center (U-PARC) in Harmarville, Pennsylvania, the Pymatuning Laboratory of Ecology in Linesville, Pennsylvania, and the Allen L. Cook Spring Creek Preserve archeological research site in Spring Creek, Wyoming.

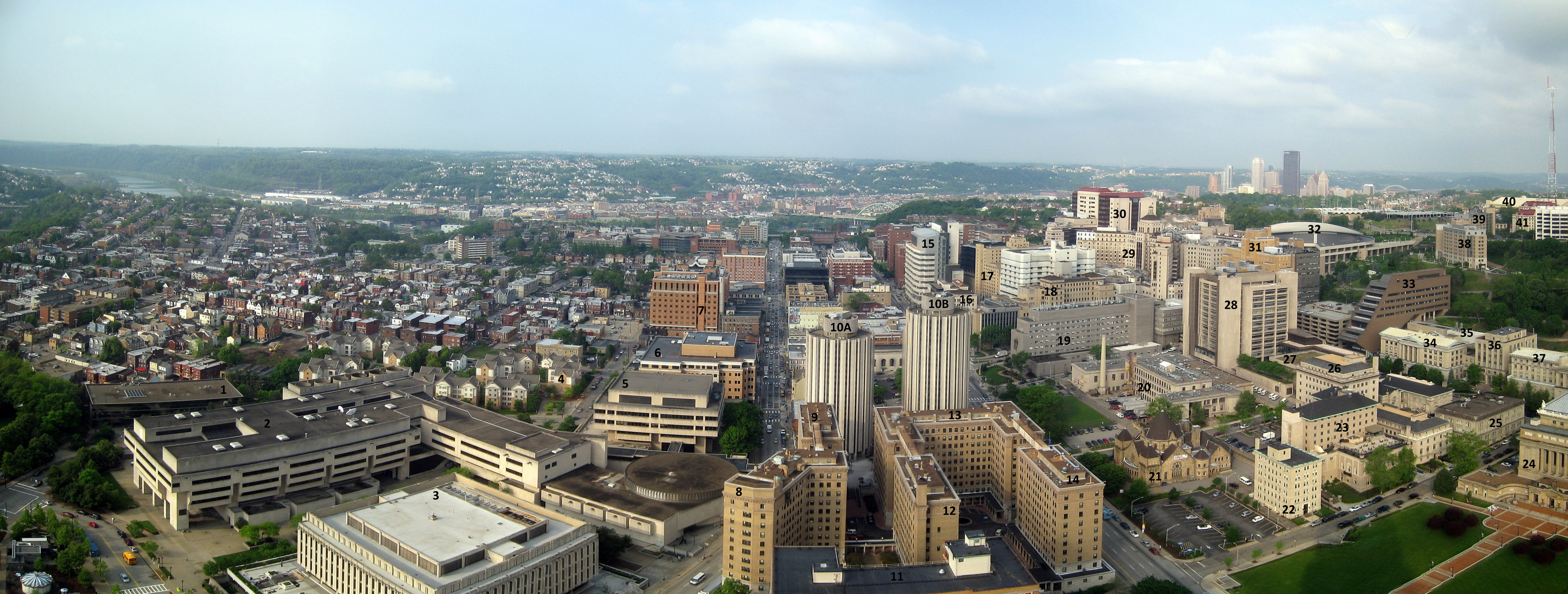
Looking southwest from a University of Pittsburgh Honors College study room on the 35th floor of the Cathedral of Learning. The height of the Cathedral provides for large vistas overlooking the city and campus. Many of the university's and medical center's buildings may be seen in this image.

=== Table of Pitt-owned buildings in Pittsburgh ===
Buildings in the sortable table below are initially listed alphabetically.

Image	Building	Constructed	Acquired	Architect	Style	Location	Usage	Designations
	530 Melwood Avenue		1989			Oakland	Motor pool repairs	
	3619-3621 Forbes Ave		2017			Oakland	Offices/retail	
	4600 5th Ave (PNC Bank building)		1961			Oakland	Bank	
	Allegheny Observatory	1900–1912	1900–1912	T.E. Billquist	Greek Revival	Riverview Park	Physics and astronomy	U.S. National Register of Historic Places; Pennsylvania State Historical Designation; Pittsburgh History and Landmarks Foundation Historic Landmark
	Allen Hall	1913–1914	1939	J. H. Giesey	Greek Revival	Oakland	Physics and astronomy	Contributing Property to the Schenley Farms National Historic District; Pittsburgh History and Landmarks Foundation Historic Landmark
	Alumni Hall	1914–1915	1993	Benno Janssen	Greek Revival	Oakland	Alumni; mixed	Contributing Property to the Schenley Farms National Historic District; Pittsburgh History and Landmarks Foundation Historic Landmark
	Amos Hall	1924	1955	Henry Hornbostel, with collaboration from Rutan & Russell and Eric Fisher Wood		Oakland	Residence hall	Contributing Property to the Schenley Farms National Historic District; Pittsburgh History and Landmarks Foundation Historic Landmark
	Barco Law Building	1976	1976	Johnstone, Newcomer and Valentour	Brutalist	Oakland	Law	
	Bates Hill Apartments		1985			Oakland	Apartments	
	Bellefield Hall	1924	1984–1994	Benno Janssen	Italianate	Oakland	Mixed academic	Contributing Property to the Schenley Farms National Historic District; Pittsburgh History and Landmarks Foundation Historic Landmark
	Bellefield Towers	1889 (tower); 1985–1987	1999	Frederick J. Osterling (tower); Stephen Casey, Urban Design Associates	Richardsonian Romanesque (tower)	Oakland	Medical offices	
	Benedum Hall	1971; Mascaro Center addition: 2008–2009	1971	Deeter Ritchey Sippel; Mascaro addition: EDGO Studio & NBBJ		Oakland	Engineering	Pennsylvania Society AIA Honor Award; Pennsylvania Society AIA Distinguished Building Award; CRSI Design Award: Educational Facility Category (Mascaro Center, 2012)
	Biomedical Science Tower South (2)	1994–1995	1994–1995	Burt Hill Kosar Rittelmann Associates		Oakland	Research	
	Biomedical Science Tower 3	2003–2005	2003–2005	Payette Associates Inc. and JSA		Oakland	Research	2007 Lab of the Year Special Mention, R&D Magazine; 2007 Merit Award, AIA/New England; 2007 Award for Design, Boston Society of Architects; 2006 Honor Award, AIA/Pittsburgh
	Brackenridge Hall	1924	1955	Henry Hornbostel, with collaboration from Rutan & Russell and Eric Fisher Wood		Oakland	Residence hall	Contributing Property to the Schenley Farms National Historic District; Pittsburgh History and Landmarks Foundation Historic Landmark
	Bruce Hall	1924	1955	Henry Hornbostel, with collaboration from Rutan & Russell and Eric Fisher Wood		Oakland	Residence hall	Contributing Property to the Schenley Farms National Historic District; Pittsburgh History and Landmarks Foundation Historic Landmark
	Bouquet Gardens	1999–2000; Building J: 2011	1999–2000	Renaissance 3 Architects, P.C.		Oakland	Residence hall	
	Building 5					Oakland	Utility	
	Carrillo Street Steam Plant	2004	2004 (Note: The Carrillo Street Steam Plant is jointly owned by the University of Pittsburgh (78.1% interest) and UPMC (21.9% interest).)	JSA		Oakland	Maintenance	3-star winner, Enviro-Star Awards
	Cathedral of Learning	1926–1937	1926–1937	Charles Klauder	Gothic Revival	Oakland	Mixed academic	U.S. National Register of Historic Places; Contributing Property to the Schenley Farms National Historic District; City of Pittsburgh Designated Landmark; Pittsburgh History and Landmarks Foundation Historic Landmark
	Center for Biotechnology and Bioengineering	1993	1993	Robert S. Pfaffmann, Bohlin Powell Larkin Cywinski		Oakland	Research	1993 Award for Excellence in Architectural Design Pennsylvania Society of Architects, 1993 Honor Award AIA Pittsburgh, 1993 Honor Award Metal Construction Association Awards
	Central Oakland Apartments		1971			Oakland	Apartments	
	Centre Plaza Apartments		1994			Shadyside	Student apartments	
	Chancellor's Residence	1896	1966	Peabody and Stearns	Colonial Revival	Shadyside	Housing	Pittsburgh History and Landmarks Foundation Historic Landmark
	Chevron Science Center	1974; Annex 2011	1974	Kuhn, Newcomer & Valentour; Annex: Wilson Architects and Renaissance 3 Architects		Oakland	Chemistry	Second place, Lab of the Year, Industrial Research magazine
	Child Development Center	1904	1992	Solon Spencer Beman	Greek Revival	Shadyside	UCDC	Pittsburgh History and Landmarks Foundation Historic Landmark
	Clapp Hall	1956	1956	Trautwein & Howard	Gothic Revival	Oakland	Biology	Contributing Property to the Schenley Farms National Historic District
	College Gardens Apartments		1969			Shadyside	Apartments	
	Cost Sports Center	1990	1990			Oakland	Athletics	
	Craig Hall		1988		Modern	Oakland	Office	
	Crabtree Hall	1969	1969	Deeter Ritchey Sippel		Oakland	Public health	
	Crawford Hall	1968	1968	Kuhn, Newcomer & Valentour		Oakland	Neuroscience	
	Croatian Fraternal Union Building	1929	2018	Pierre A. Liesch	Flemish Gothic Revival	Oakland	slated for demolition	nominated
	Darragh Street Apartment Complex	2007	2007	Renaissance 3 Architects, P.C.		Oakland	Apartments	
	David Lawrence Hall	1968	1968	Johnstone, McMillin & Associates		Oakland	Mixed academic	
	Eberly Hall	1920–1921	1920–1921	Benno Janssen	Greek Revival	Oakland	Chemistry	
	Eureka Building	1924–1925	1993	Louis Stevens		Oakland	Facilities management	
	Falk Clinic	1931	1931	Edward Purcell Mellon		Oakland	Medical	
	Falk School	1931; Addition: 2007–2009	1931	Janssen and Cocken; Addition: Perkin Eastman		Oakland	Education	
	Fitzgerald Field House	1951	1951			Oakland	Athletics	
	Forbes Craig Apartments		1964			Oakland	Residence hall	
	Forbes Pavilion	1964	1977			Oakland	Residence hall	
	Ford Motor Building	1915	2018	John Graham		Bloomfield	Research	U.S. National Register of Historic Places
	Fraternity Housing Complex	1984	1984			Oakland	Housing	
	Frick Fine Arts Building	1962–1965	1962–1965	Burton Kenneth Johnstone	Neo-Renaissance	Oakland	Art	Contributing Property to the Schenley Farms National Historic District
	Gardner Steel Conference Center	1911–1912	1920	Kiehnel & Elliott	Early Modern	Oakland	Mixed academic	Contributing Property to the Schenley Farms National Historic District; Pittsburgh History and Landmarks Foundation Historic Landmark
	Gold Building (3343 Forbes Avenue)	1986?	2000			Oakland	Office and laboratories	
	Heinz Memorial Chapel	1933–1938	1933–1938	Charles Klauder	Gothic Revival	Oakland	Religious performance	Contributing Property to the Schenley Farms National Historic District; Pittsburgh History and Landmarks Foundation Historic Landmark
	Hillman Library	1965–1968	1965–1968	Celli-Flynn and Associates; Kuhn, Newcomer & Valentour; Max Abramovitz		Oakland	Library	1996 Timeless Award for Enduring Design, Pittsburgh chapter of the American Institute of Architects
	Holland Hall	1924	1955	Henry Hornbostel, with collaboration from Rutan & Russell and Eric Fisher Wood		Oakland	Residence hall	Contributing Property to the Schenley Farms National Historic District; Pittsburgh History and Landmarks Foundation Historic Landmark
	Hyacinth Place	1917	2018			Oakland	Apartments	
	Information Sciences Building	1965	1968	Tasso Katselas	Brutalist	Oakland	Information science	
	Irvis Hall	2004	2004	Perkins Eastman Architects		Oakland	Residence hall	
	Langley Hall	1959–1961	1959–1961			Oakland	Biology	
	Life Science Annex	2007	2007	Burt Hill Architects		Oakland	Biology neuroscience	
	Litchfield Towers	1963	1963	Deeter & Ritchey		Oakland	Residence hall	
	Loeffler Building		2003			Oakland	Office	
	Log Cabin	1820–1830s	1986			Oakland	Storage	
	Lothrop Hall	1950–1953	1950–1953			Oakland	Residence hall	
	Mayflower Apartments		1963			Oakland	Apartments	
	McCormick Hall	1924	1955	Henry Hornbostel, with collaboration from Rutan & Russell and Eric Fisher Wood		Oakland	Residence hall	Contributing Property to the Schenley Farms National Historic District; Pittsburgh History and Landmarks Foundation Historic Landmark
	McGowan Institute Laboratory Building	1999–2002	1999–2002	IKM, Inc.		South Side	Research	gold LEED award from the U.S. Green Building Council
	Melwood Maintenance Building		1986			Oakland	Maintenance	
	Mervis Hall	1983	1983	IKM/SGE		Oakland	Business	
	Music Building	1884	1953	Longfellow, Alden & Harlow	Richardsonian Romanesque	Oakland	Music	Contributing Property to the Schenley Farms National Historic District
	Nordenberg Hall	2012–2013	2012–2013	Mackey Mitchell Architects and MacLachlan, Cornelius, & Filoni		Oakland	Residence hall	
	Oakwood Apartments		1971			Oakland	Apartments	
	O'Hara Street Garage	1960	1960			Oakland	Garage	
	O'Hara Student Center	1913	2009	Charles Bickel	Romanesque Revival	Oakland		Contributing Property to the Schenley Farms National Historic District
	Old Engineering Hall	1954–1955	1954–1955			Oakland	Engineering; physics	
	Oxford Building		1992			Oakland	Office rental	
	Parran Hall	1957; Addition: 2011–2013	1957	Eggers & Higgins; Addition:Renaissance 3 Architects and Wilson Architects		Oakland	Public health	
	Panther Hall	2006	2006	Perkins Eastman Architects		Oakland	Residence hall	
	Parkvale Building	1911	2018	Frederick J. Osterling	Beaux-Arts	Oakland	Office	
	Pittsburgh Athletic Association	1911	2024	Janssen & Abbott	Venetian High Renaissance	Oakland	TBD	U.S. National Register of Historic Places; Contributing Property to the Schenley Farms National Historic District; Pittsburgh History and Landmarks Foundation Historic Landmark
	Petersen Events Center	2002	2002	Apostolou Associates and Rosser International of Atlanta		Oakland	Athletics	2003 Innovative Architecture & Design Honor Award
	Petersen Sports Complex	2011	2011	L. Robert Kimball and Associates		Oakland	Athletics	
	Posvar Hall	1975–1978	1975–1978	Johnstone Newcomer & Valentour; Max Abramowitz	Brutalist	Oakland	Mixed academic; secondary computer datacenter	
	Quality Inn University Center		1999			Oakland	Rental; hotel	
	Rand Building	2004–2006	2004–2006	Burt Hill Kosar Rittelmann Associates		Oakland	Rental	
	Residences on Bigelow		2022			Oakland	Apartments	
	Ruskin Hall	1921–1922	1958	H. L. Stevens & Company		Oakland	Residence hall	Contributing Property to the Schenley Farms National Historic District
	Salk Hall	1941; Addition: 2012–2014	1957	Richard Irving and Theodore Eicholz; Addition: Ballinger Architects	Art Deco	Oakland	Dental; pharmacy	Pennsylvania State Historical Designation; Pittsburgh History and Landmarks Foundation Historic Landmark
	Salk Hall Annex	1967	1967	Deeter, Ritchey, and Sippel		Oakland	Dental; pharmacy	
	Scaife Hall	1954–1956	1954–1956	Schmidt, Garden and Erickson		Oakland	Medical	
	Sennott Square	2002	2002	JSA		Oakland	Mixed academic	
	Space Research Coordination Center	1965	1965	Deeter & Ritchey		Oakland	Physics and astronomy	
	Stephen Foster Memorial	1937	1937	Charles Klauder	Gothic Revival	Oakland	Theatre	Contributing Property to the Schenley Farms National Historic District; Pennsylvania State Historical Designation; Pittsburgh History and Landmarks Foundation Historic Landmark
	Sutherland Hall	1992	1992			Oakland	Residence hall	
	Thackeray Hall	1923–1925	1968	Abram Garfield	Early Classical	Oakland	Math administration	Contributing Property to the Schenley Farms National Historic District
	Thaw Hall	1910	1910	Henry Hornbostel	Greek Revival	Oakland	Physics and astronomy	Contributing Property to the Schenley Farms National Historic District; Pittsburgh History and Landmarks Foundation Historic Landmark
	Thomas Boulevard Library Resource Facility		1986			Point Breeze	Library	
	Thomas Detre Hall of the WPIC	1938–1940	1949 (Note: Since 1949, Western Psychiatric Institute and Clinic (WPIC) has been operated by the university's school of medicine under special arrangement from the state and all land, structures (Thomas Detre Hall), and equipment is leased to Pitt from the Commonwealth of Pennsylvania for $1 per year. Since 1992, Pitt has in turn subleased WPIC to UPMC with UPMC maintaining clinical operations and Pitt therein housing its School of Medicine's Department of Psychiatry.)	Raymond Marlier	Art Deco	Oakland	Medical	
	Thomas E. Starzl Biomedical Science Tower	1990	1990	Burt Hill Kosar Rittelmann Associates		Oakland	Research	Lab of the Year, R&D Magazine
	Trees Field					Oakland	Athletics	
	Trees Hall	1958–1962; Phase II: 1965	1958–1962	Deeter & Ritchey		Oakland	Athletics	
	Twentieth Century Club	1910; Renovated/expanded 1930	2020	Benno Janssen (renovation/expansion)	Renaissance Revival	Oakland	undecided	Contributing Property to the Schenley Farms National Historic District
	University Club	1923; addition 1963	2005	Henry Hornbostel		Oakland	Faculty club	Contributing Property to the Schenley Farms National Historic District
	University Public Safety Building	2006	2006	Strada, LLC		Oakland	Security	
	Van de Graaff Building	1964	1964			Oakland	Physics	
	Victoria Building	1977	1977	Deeter, Ritchey, and Sippel		Oakland	Nursing	
	William Pitt Union	1898	1956	Rutan & Russell	Beaux-Arts	Oakland	Student center	Contributing Property to the Schenley Farms National Historic District; Pennsylvania State Historical Designation; Pittsburgh History and Landmarks Foundation Historic Landmark

=== Table of former Pitt-owned buildings in Pittsburgh ===
The following table lists buildings that were owned and utilized by the university but have subsequently been either sold or demolished.

Image	Building	Constructed/ acquired	Demolished or sold	Architect	Style	Location	Usage	Designations	Replaced by
	118 Craft Avenue	1930/1996	2014			Oakland	Residential/rental		empty lot
	Automotive-Highway Laboratory	1919	Demo:			Oakland	Automotive and highway materials laboratories		none
	DeSoto Hall	acquired 1948	Demo			Oakland	Men's dormatory		
	Graduate House	acquired 1949				Oakland	Graduate student housing		
	Heinz House	1919	Demo:			Oakland	Women's social hall, Dean of Women's offices		none
	Learning Research and Development Center	1974	2022	Harrison & Abramovitz		Oakland	Education	various architectural awards	student recreation center
	Mineral Industries Building	1912	Demo: 2001	Henry Hornbostel	Greek Revival	Oakland	School of Dental Medicine/ Engineering and other various departments		none
	Oak Manor	? acquired 1921	Demo: 1930			Oakland	Faculty club		UPMC Presbyterian
	Pennsylvania Hall	1910–11	Demo: 1998	Henry Hornbostel	Greek Revival	Oakland	School of Medicine/ various departments		Pennsylvania Hall
	State Hall	1908–1910	Demo: 1971	Henry Hornbostel	Greek Revival	Oakland	Administration, engineering, classrooms, library		Chevron Science Center
	Pitt Stadium	1925	Demo: 1999	W. S. Hindman	Greek Revival	Oakland	Athletic stadium		Petersen Events Center
	Trees Gymnasium	1912	Demo:		Greek Revival	Oakland	Gymnasium		VA Hospital, University Drive
	University Place Office Building	1924	Demo: 2011	Edward B. Lee and associate architect J. B. Blair	Renaissance revival	Oakland	University Center for Social and Urban Research	Contributing Property to the Schenley Farms National Historic District	Nordenberg Hall

== UPMC ==
The flagship of UPMC's hospital network is centered in the Oakland neighborhood of Pittsburgh within, and adjacent to, the campus of the University of Pittsburgh. Many university departments, institutes and programs are housed within UPMC facilities and vice versa. The administrative headquarters of UPMC are moving into the top floors of the U.S. Steel Tower in downtown Pittsburgh. In Pennsylvania, UPMC also owns and operates facilities outside Pittsburgh including hospitals in Aspinwall (UPMC St. Margaret), Bedford (UPMC Bedford), Braddock (UPMC Braddock), Cranberry (UPMC Passavant – Cranberry Campus), Greenville (UPMC Horizon: Greenville), McCandless (UPMC Passavant – McCandless campus), (UPMC McKeesport), Seneca (UPMC Northwest), and Farrell (UPMC Horizon: Shenango Valley), as well as operating ISMETT, located in Palermo, Sicily. UPMC also owns and operates a variety of other facilities inside Pennsylvania including cancer centers (also internationally in Ireland and the United Kingdom), retirement and long-term care facilities, and community and medical and surgical facilities.

=== Table of UPMC-owned buildings in Pittsburgh ===
The sortable table below has its included buildings initially listed alphabetically.

Image	Building	Constructed	Architect	Style	Location	Usage	Designations
	UPMC Children's Hospital of Pittsburgh (Abandoned Oakland building)	1927, +	York & Sawyer with collaboration from Edward Purcell Mellon		Oakland	Hospital	
	UPMC Children's Hospital of Pittsburgh	2003–2009	Astorino		Lawrenceville	Hospital research	
	Clinical Labs Building				Oakland	Laboratories	
	Fifth Avenue Rental Property				Oakland	Office	
	Forbes Tower	1996	Tasso Katselas Associates		Oakland	Mixed academic office	
	Hill Building				Oakland	Office and laboratories	
	Hillman Cancer Center	1999–2002	IKM		Shadyside	Cancer center	2003 Circle of Design Excellence Award; Western PA Golden Trowel Award, 2003
	Iroquois Building	1901–1903	Frederick Osterling		Oakland	Office	
	Kaufmann Medical Building	1950			Oakland	Clinic	
	Magee-Womens Hospital of UPMC	1915, +	Thorsten Bilquist		Oakland	Hospital	
	Magee-Womens Hospital of UPMC Administrative Offices	1930	The McCormick Co.		Oakland	Offices	former Isaly's Dairy building
	Magee-Womens Research Institute				Oakland	Research	
	Merex Building				Oakland	Office	
	Medical Arts Building	1932	Maximilian Nirdlinger	Art Deco	Oakland	Office	
	Oakland House				Oakland	Office	
	UPMC Eye & Ear Institute		Edward Purcell Mellon		Oakland	Hospital	
	UPMC Mercy	1918, 1972	MacLachlan, Cornelius & Filoni Architects, Inc.		Bluff	Hospital	
	UPMC Montefiore	1927	Schmidt, Garden & Erikson with collaboration from Henry Hornbostel		Oakland	Hospital	
	UPMC Presbyterian	1930–38	York & Sawyer, with Edward Purcell Mellon		Oakland	Hospital	
	UPMC Shadyside				Shadyside	Hospital	
	UPMC Shadyside – Shadyside Place				Shadyside		
	Professional Building				Oakland	Office	
	UPMC South Side				South Side	Hospital	
	UPMC Sports Performance Complex	1999–2000	Astorino		South Side	Specialty clinic	Commercial Project of the Year – Engineers' Society of Western Pennsylvania; Honored as a Top Project in the Pennsylvania & Delaware Valley Region

== See also ==
- Oakland - the neighborhood of the main Pitt campus
- Schenley Farms Historic District - the historic district in Oakland which the main campus is located. Many other historic buildings in this district are scattered among the Pitt campus and are utilized for various school functions.
