= Nordenberg =

Nordenberg is a surname. Notable people with the surname include:

- Bengt Nordenberg (1822–1902), Swedish artist who belonged to the Düsseldorf school of painting
- Mark Nordenberg (born 1948), Chancellor emeritus of the University of Pittsburgh and chair of the university's Institute of Politics
- Pontus Nordenberg (born 1995), Swedish footballer

See also:

- Nordenberg Hall, University Office Place
