= Mark Nordenberg =

American academic administrator (born 1948)

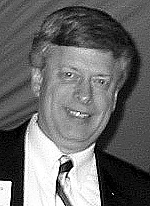

17th Chancellor of the University of Pittsburgh
- In office August 1, 1995 – August 1, 2014; Interim: August 1, 1995 - August 1, 1996
- Preceded by: J. Dennis O'Connor
- Succeeded by: Patrick D. Gallagher

Personal details
- Born: July 12, 1948 (age 78) Duluth, Minnesota, U.S.
- Spouse: Nikki Pirillo (m. 1970)
- Children: 3
- Education: Thiel College (BA); University of Wisconsin—Madison (JD)

Mark A. Nordenberg (born July 12, 1948) is the chancellor emeritus of the University of Pittsburgh and chair of the university's Institute of Politics and Director of its Dick Thornburgh Forum for Law & Public Policy, both positions from which he will retire on June 30. A professor of law and university administrator, Nordenberg served as the seventeenth Chancellor of the University of Pittsburgh from 1996 to 2014. Nordenberg served as the Dean of the University of Pittsburgh School of Law between 1985 and 1993 and other various administrative positions before becoming interim Chancellor of the University of Pittsburgh in 1995, a position which became permanent the following year. He became known as Nordy to many Pitt students, who voted to name a recreation center and arcade in the William Pitt Union as Nordy's Place, and is also the namesake of the university's endowed Nordenberg Scholarships and the Nordenberg Hall dormitory on the university's campus.

== Early life ==
Nordenberg was born in Duluth, Minnesota. Nordenberg's family moved to suburban Pittsburgh when his father was relocated with U.S. Steel. He graduated with honors from North Allegheny High School. He was then educated at Thiel College (BA 1970) and the University of Wisconsin Law School (JD 1973).

== At Pitt ==
In 1977, Nordenberg joined the faculty of the University of Pittsburgh School of Law as a visiting professor. He served as Dean of the School of Law from 1985 until 1993 and as Interim Provost and Senior Vice Chancellor for Academic Affairs from 1993 to 1994. The Pitt Board of Trustees elected him Interim Chancellor in 1995 and a year later, after completing a national search, Chancellor.

On June 28, 2013, Nordenberg announced his retirement as Chancellor to be effective August 2014, but with the intent to stay in Pittsburgh and continue to work at the University of Pittsburgh:

My short-term goal is clear. I intend to work as hard as I can during my final year as Chancellor to make certain that it is another great year for Pitt. My clear intention is to remain in Pittsburgh and at Pitt once that next year has concluded, and I have agreed to make myself available, as requested, to assist my successor, particularly in matters involving external relations. Beyond that, I would expect to teach and to remain engaged in public service projects focused on the advancement of the region.

— Chancellor Mark A. Nordenberg, Pitt Chronicle

=== Institutional accomplishments ===
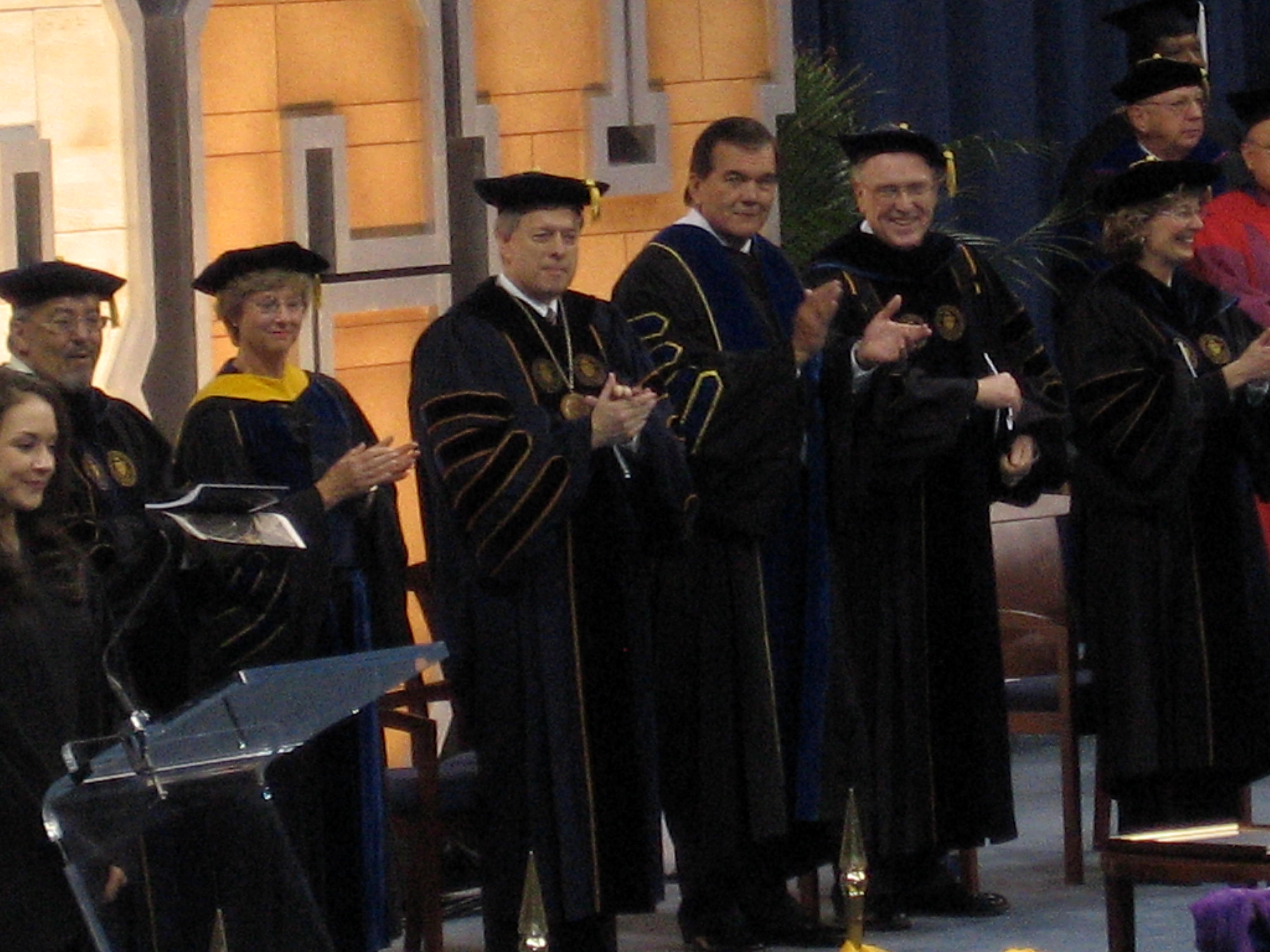
Chancellor Nordenberg (fourth from left) in full academic regalia during Pitt's graduation commencement exercises in 2007

Nordenberg is credited with initiatives that have improved the university's academic, research and athletic standing, and contributed to the renovation and expansion of the university's physical plant.

Between 1995 and 2013, student enrollment at Pitt grew 21%, from 27,002 to 32,781 with over 137,000 degrees conferred, and the average SAT score of the applicants grew 185 points. This change is reflective in the student's accomplishments. During his tenure, Pitt undergraduate students have received four Rhodes Scholarships, five Truman Scholarships, six Marshall Scholarships, seven Udall Scholarships, and 41 Goldwater Scholarships. At the same period, Pitt faculty members have been recognized multiple times as Fulbright Scholars, Boren Scholars, Whitaker International Fellows, National Science Foundation Fellows, Critical Language Scholars, and Humanity in Action Scholars; they received prestigious awards such as the National Medal of Science, the Lasker-DeBakey Clinical Medical Research Award, the MacArthur Foundation's "genius award," the Charles S. Mott Prize in cancer research, and the Andrew Mellon Foundation Distinguished Achievement Award for exemplary contributions to humanistic studies.

During Nordenberg's tenure, Pitt re-established its reputation as a national and world class research university, and its yearly research allocations grew from $230 million in 1995 to $800 million in 2013. University of Pittsburgh is a member of the Association of American Universities, that consist of the 71 top North American research universities. Pitt is prominent in physical, life and social sciences: along with Johns Hopkins, Washington, Michigan, and Pennsylvania universities it is one of the top five largest recipients of National Institute of Health support; in comparison, in 1995 Pitt was ranked the 24th in the same list. The federal government also designated the Center for Latin American Studies, the Center for Russian and East European Studies, and the Global Studies Center as National Resource Centers.

Despite the Great Recession of 2008 and continuous cuts to the state contribution to the university's budget, Pitt under Nordeberg maintains an AA/positive long-term ratings from Standard & Poor. Its endowment grew from $463 million in 1995 to $2.99 billion in 2013.

=== Physical plant renovation ===
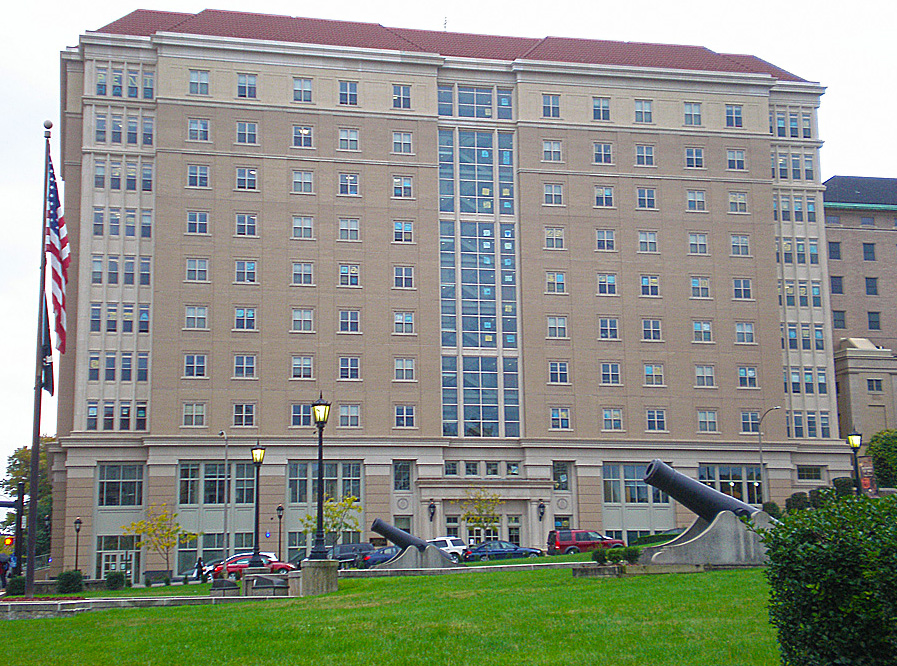
The university residence hall opened in 2013 was named in Nordenberg's honor

Nordenberg oversaw the renovation of several major Pitt buildings including Alumni Hall and Benedum Hall; the demolition of Pitt Stadium, the original Pennsylvania Hall, and the Mineral Industries Building; the acquisition and repurposing of the University Club and the Concordia Club; and the construction of Bouquet Gardens, the McGowen Institute Laboratory building, the Petersen Events Center, Sennott Square, Biomedical Science Tower 3, the Carrillo Street Steam Plant, the new Pennsylvania Hall, Panther Hall, the Public Safety Building, the Life Science Annex, Darragh Street Apartments, the Petersen Sports Complex, and replacement of the University Place Office Building with Nordenberg Hall. He also oversaw the initiation and completion of a $2 billion capital campaign entitled "Building Our Future Together".

== Honors ==
In 1984, Nordenberg received the first Excellence-in-Teaching Award from Pitt's School of Law and, in 1985, the Chancellor's Distinguished Teaching Award from the University of Pittsburgh. He was named Distinguished Service Professor of Law in 1994.

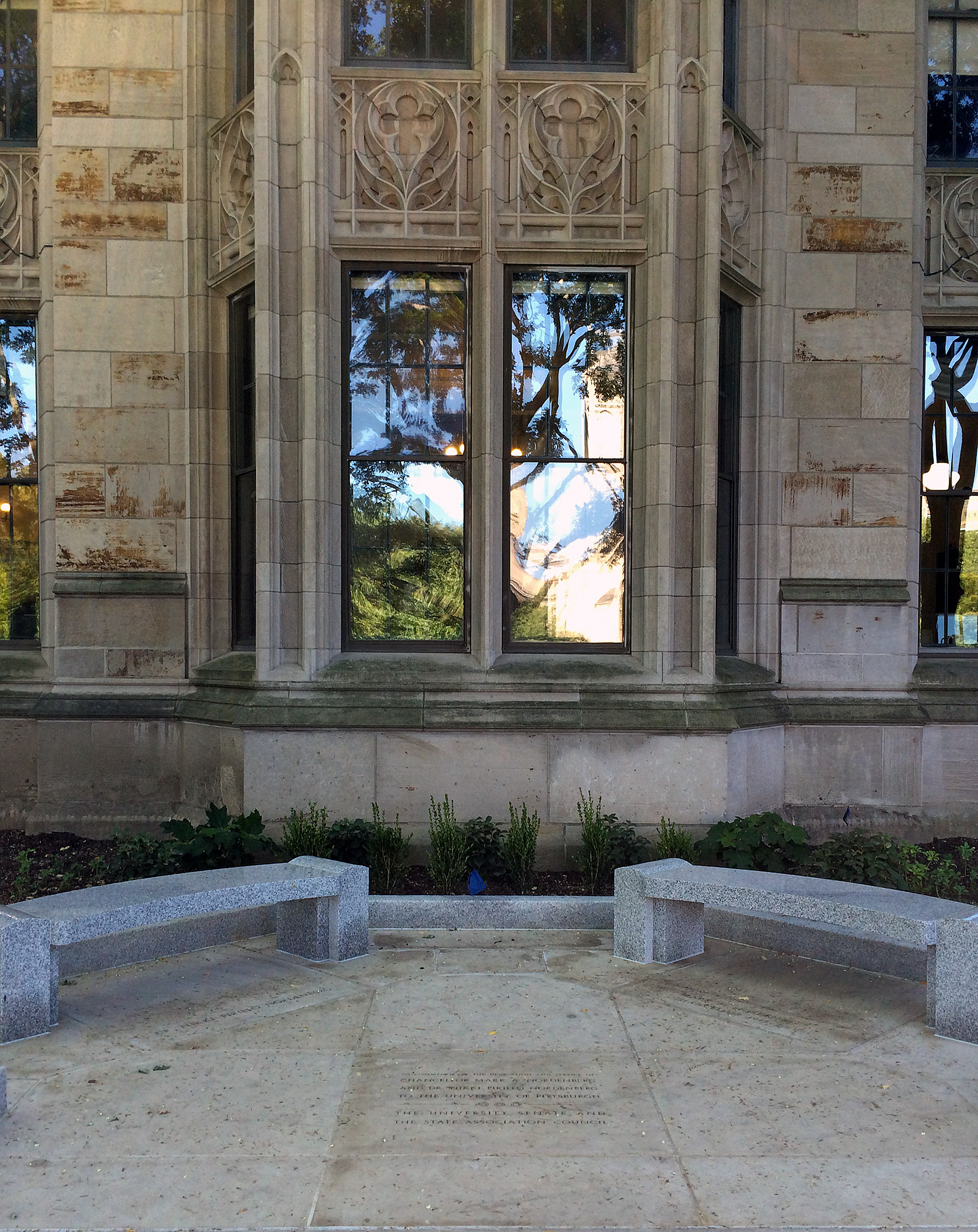
Pitt's Staff Association Council and the University Senate honored Mark Nordenberg and his wife Nikki for their service to the university by installing commemorative bench plaza outside of the Cathedral of Learning

In 1997, he was honored as Person of the Year in Education by Vectors, a community service organization in Pittsburgh. He was named Pittsburgher of the Year and Co-Pittsburgher of the Year by Pittsburgh Magazine in 1999 and 2001, respectively. in June 2005, the university's board of trustees announced the establishment of the endowed Chancellor Mark A. Nordenberg University Chair position to honor the Chancellor's 10 years of leadership. In December 2007, by resolution of the Pitt Student Government Board, the recreation room on the ground floor of the William Pitt Union was named Nordy's Place in honor of the Chancellor whom the board deemed a student favorite and worthy of the honor.

In 2009, Nordenberg was honored with the 2009 Presidential Leadership Award by The Gordie Foundation and Outside the Classroom Award for his role in overseeing Pitt's mission to combat binge drinking. He also serves on the board of directors of UPMC and The Bank of New York Mellon.

On October 26, 2012, the Pitt Board of Trustees announced a $10 million scholarship fund and the naming of a new campus residence hall, Nordenberg Hall, in honor Nordenberg, citing his role in transforming Pitt in 17 years leading the school.

On February 6, 2014, Nordenberg was presented with the Louis and Barbara Thiel Distinguished Service Award by his alma mater, Thiel College as part of their annual Founders' Day Convocation ceremonies.

On February 6, 2014, Nordenberg was awarded the Dapper Dan Dr. Freddie Fu Leadership Award in athletics.

On April 8, 2014, Nordenberg, along with former Carnegie Mellon University president Jared Cohon, were named recipients of the Elsie Hilliard Hillman Lifetime Achievement Award for Excellence in Public Service.

On May 9, 2014, Nordenberg and Cohon were awarded the Chairman's award by the Carnegie Science Center of Pittsburgh for leadership in science, technology, and education.

On May 12, 2014, the university's Staff Association Council and the University Senate announced it was honoring Nordenberg and his wife Nikki with a pair of commemorative benches that were placed outside the windows of the Chancellor's office in the Cathedral of Learning.

In 2016, he was awarded both the Distinguished Leadership Award from the American Red Cross and the Mary Schenley Medal for Parks and Stewardship from the Pittsburgh Parks Conservancy.

In 2018, Nordenberg was recognized as a Distinguished Alumni for Excellence and Leadership in Education by North Allegheny School District.

In 2019, he was named a Trustee Emeritus by Thiel College's Board of Trustees.

In 2021, Nordenberg was awarded the Lifetime Achievement in Governance by the National Association of Corporate Directors, Three Rivers Chapter.

In 2025, Nordenberg was elected to the prestigious American Academy of Arts and Sciences, which was founded in 1780 to honor excellence and convene leaders from every field of human endeavor to examine new ideas and address issues of importance to the nation and the world.

Also, in 2025, he was awarded the inaugural Jim Roddey Leadership Award.

He has been awarded honorary degrees by Carnegie Mellon University, the Community College of Allegheny County, Duquesne University, La Roche College, Thiel College and the University of Pittsburgh.

== Post-chancellorship ==
The university announced on February 8, 2014, that Patrick D. Gallagher would take over for Nordenberg in August 2014. At the close of his service as chancellor, Nordenberg was appointed as the chair of the University of Pittsburgh Institute of Politics, a position from which he will retire on June 30, and was named chancellor emeritus.

== Pennsylvania Legislative Reapportionment Commission Chair ==
On 3 May 2021, the Supreme Court of Pennsylvania named Nordenberg Chair of the Pennsylvania Legislative Reapportionment Commission, tasked with redrawing PA legislative districts following the 2020 Census. The Commission produced a plan that was responsive to significant population and demographic shifts and was adopted by a bipartisan Commission vote, unanimously upheld by the state Supreme Court, and widely praised by good government groups.

== Anti-Hate ==
Nordenberg served on the special independent committee created by the Jewish Federation of Greater Pittsburgh to fairly disburse undesignated donations made to its "victims of terror fund" following the deadly attack at Pittsburgh's Tree of Life synagogue. He and CMU President Emeritus Cohon worked together to lay the foundation for the creation of the Collaboratory Against Hate, a joint research initiative of CMU and Pitt. He is the founding co-chair, with Laura Ellsworth, of the Eradicate Hate Global Summit, now widely recognized as the most comprehensive anti-hate initiative in the world. For this work, the two of them have been awarded the Pursuers of Peace Award by the Rodef Shalom congregation and the Righteous Among the Neighbors Award by the Holocaust Center of Pittsburgh and the LIGHT Education Initiative.

== Family ==
Nordenberg married Nikki Pirillo in 1970, and they have three adult children and four grandchildren.

Academic offices
Preceded by Richard J. Pierce, Jr.	Dean of the University of Pittsburgh School of Law; 1985–1993	Succeeded by Richard H. Seeburger
Preceded by J. Dennis O'Connor	Chancellor of the University of Pittsburgh; 1995–2014	Succeeded by Patrick D. Gallagher
