= Mervis Hall =

Building on University of Pittsburgh campus

Coordinates: 40°26′27″N 79°57′12″W

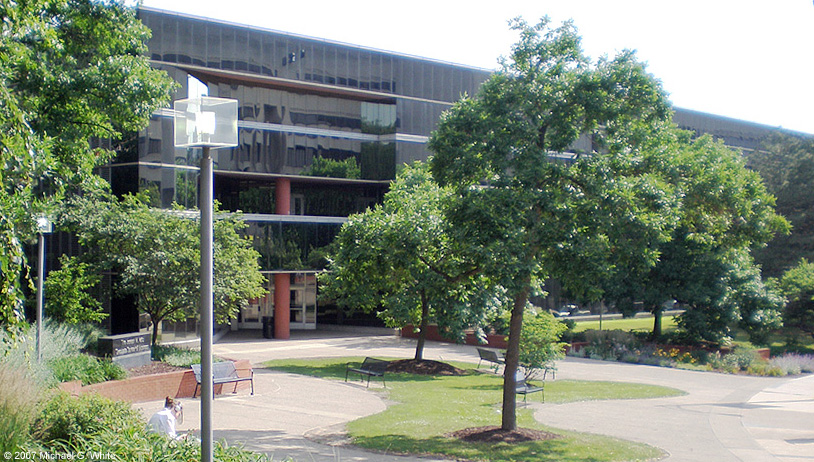
Mervis Hall at the University of Pittsburgh.

Mervis Hall is an academic building at the University of Pittsburgh in Pittsburgh, Pennsylvania, United States that houses the Katz Graduate School of Business and College of Business Administration Undergraduate Program. The building was built by the IKM/SGE partnership on the former site of Forbes Field and dedicated in 1983. The flagpole and a portion of the left and center field walls still exist just outside adjacent to the left plaza of the building. A bronze plaque indicates the portion over which Mazeroski's 1960 blast traveled.

Mervis Hall is named after Lou and Myra G. Mervis, who established a trust fund for Pitt's Graduate School of Business in 1972. Lou Mervis, a business administration major as an undergraduate, was a football star at Pitt under Coach Pop Warner. Mervis Hall was originally dedicated as the name of the building now called Thackeray Hall, which housed the Graduate School of Business from 1972 until it moved into the new Mervis Hall completed in 1983. Previous to this, business classes were held in the Cathedral of Learning and Bruce Hall.

A number of photos, engravings, watercolors and mixed media works hang on the second and third floors. The 1971 aluminum sculpture "Twin Circles Geared Together" by Willi Gutmann located on the second floor was a gift from ALCOA. On the third floor, the Salvador Dalí lithograph, “Cosmic Athlete,” is among several works gracing the hallways.

In the November, 2007, renovations on the building began and included a new $2.3 million, 3,000-square-foot (280 m^{2}) financial lab completed in 2008 which simulates global financial markets. The lab provides students with real-time stock market data and features a financial trading simulator, stock tickers, tote display boards, 58 computer stations, live news feeds, and classroom space. The lab also includes technology-enhanced breakout and conference rooms. In other phases of the renovation, an additional $2.3 million will create new suites for administration and information technology services, as well as a new suite for the Master of Business Administration program that will house the placement, admissions, and career services departments the third floor of Mervis Hall.

== Gallery ==
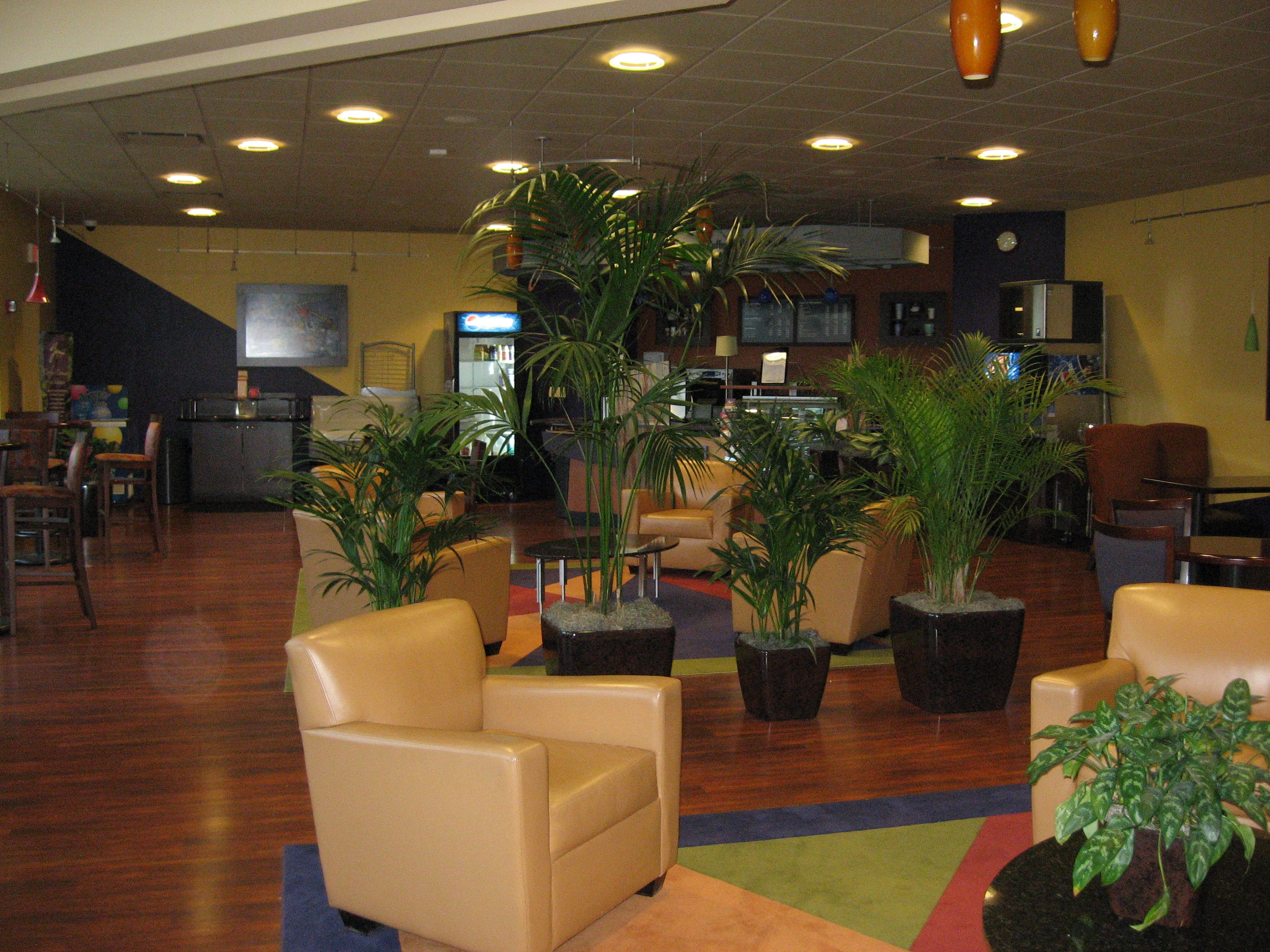
Lobby inside Mervis Hall

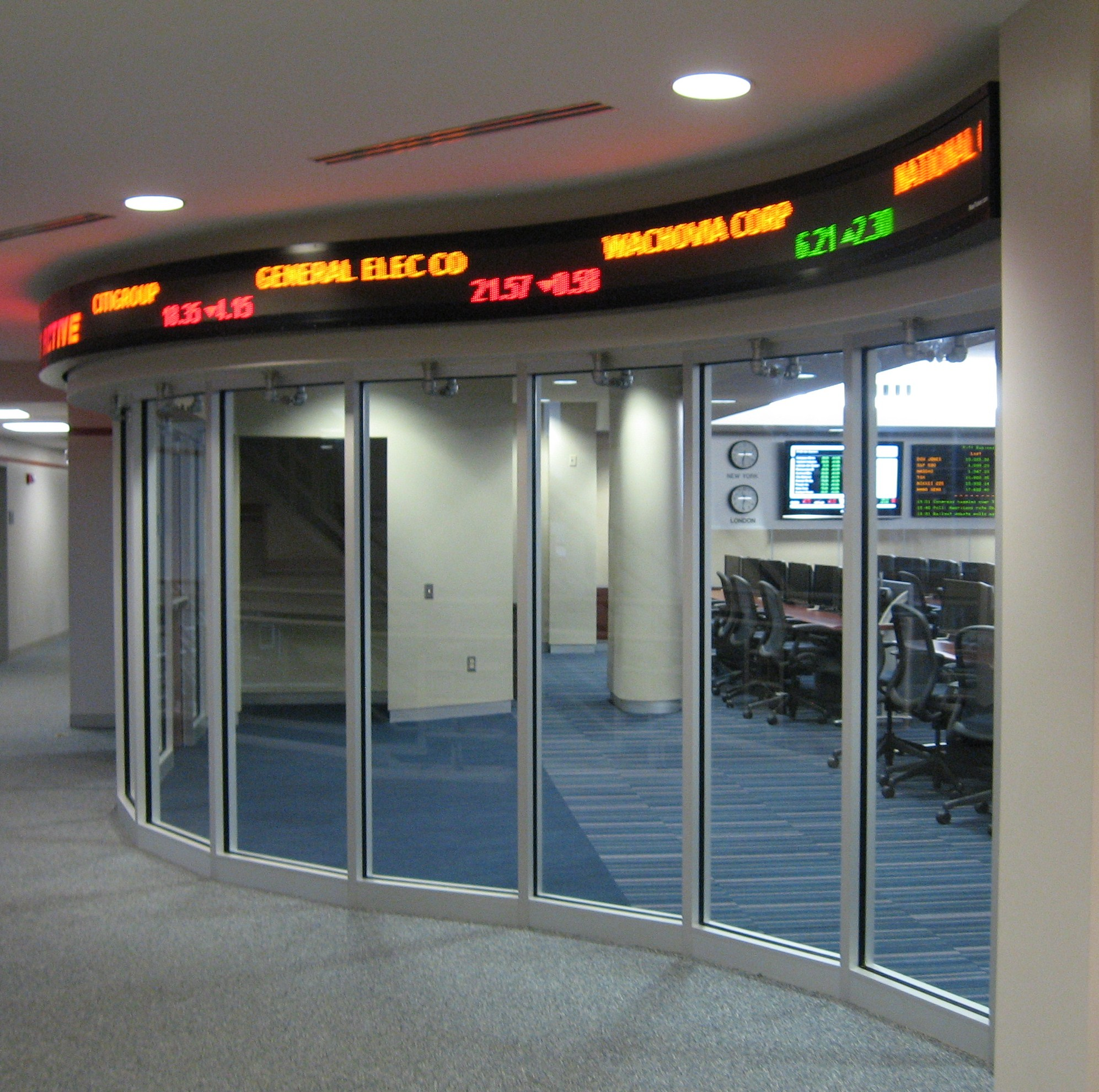
Financial lab on 2nd floor

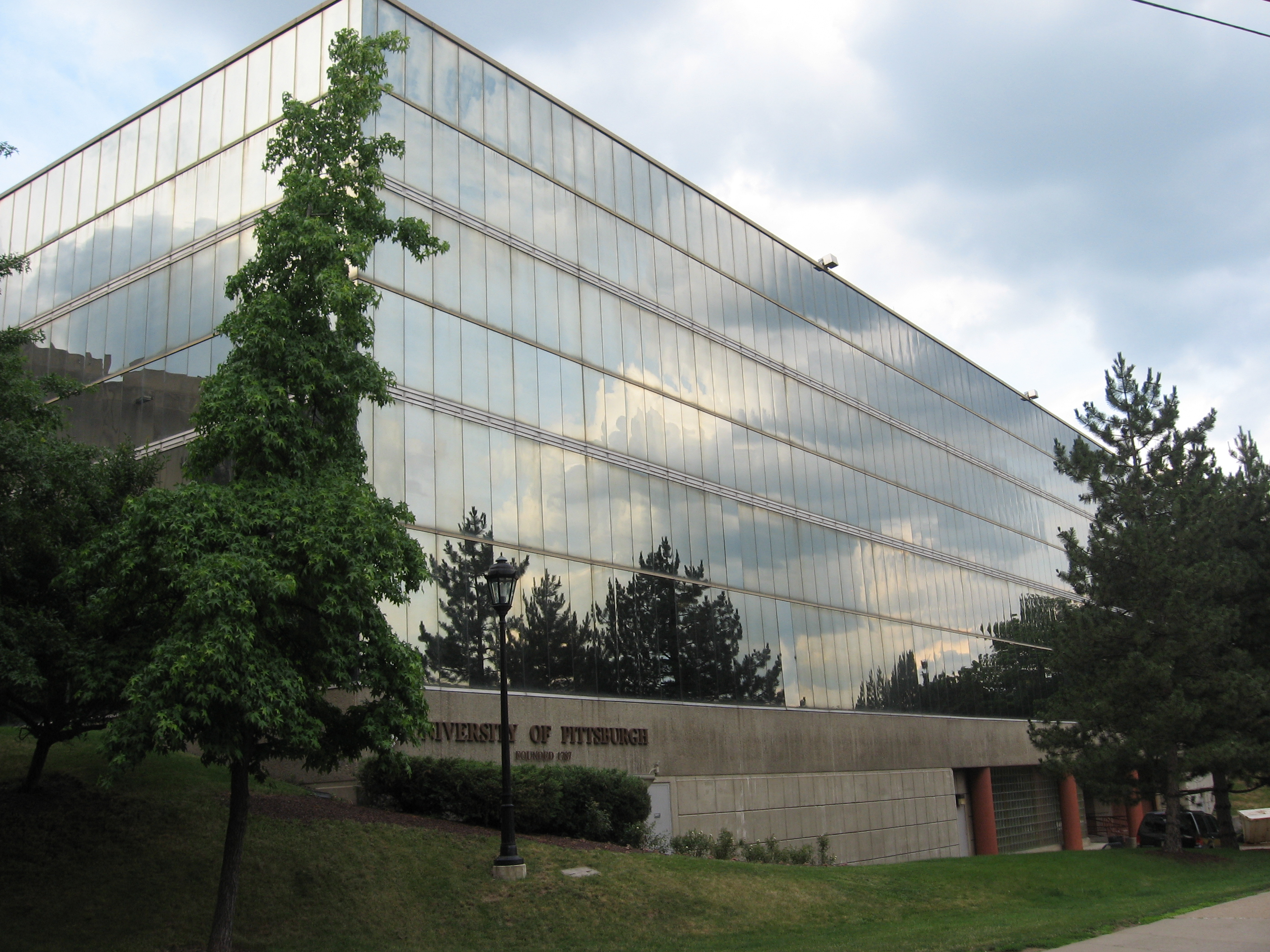
Mervis Hall

Preceded by Victoria Building	University of Pittsburgh buildings Mervis Hall; Constructed: 1983	Succeeded by Cost Sports Center
