= Willi Gutmann =

Swiss sculptor (1927–2013)

Willi Gutmann (2 December 1927 – 21 February 2013) was a Swiss sculptor.

"Twin Circles Geared Together" is at Mervis Hall, University of Pittsburgh

Gutmann was born in Dielsdorf, Switzerland. He died at age 85. He began his career as an architect and designer but moved on to sculpture in the early 1960s. The majority of his sculptures employ metals and alloys that he transformed in various ways. Gutmann specialized in monumental sculptures based on disjointed, movable bodies. Gutmann's sculptures can be found throughout the world, including the United States, Mexico, Canada, Japan, and across Europe.

Gutmann's largest sculpture, "Two Columns with Wedge" (1971), is 84 feet tall and is located at the Embarcadero Center in San Francisco, California.

He was the artist representing Switzerland at the 1968 Summer Olympics Route of Friendship in Mexico City. His work, "Twin Circles Geared Together" is located in Mervis Hall at the University of Pittsburgh.
