= University of Pittsburgh School of Nursing =

Public nursing school in Pittsburgh, Pennsylvania, US

Coordinates: 40.441376°N 79.960732°W

- Type: Public
- Established: 1939
- Dean: Christine E. Kasper, PhD, RN, FAAN, FACSM
- Faculty: 84
- Undergraduates: 558
- Postgraduates: 417
- Location: Pittsburgh, Pennsylvania, US
- Campus: Oakland (Main)
- Website: http://www.nursing.pitt.edu

The University of Pittsburgh, School of Nursing is the nursing school of the University of Pittsburgh (Pitt), located in Pittsburgh, Pennsylvania. Founded on April 6, 1939, the Pitt School of Nursing was officially separated from the School of Medicine and became an independent, professional school within the university. Ruth Perkins Kuehn served as the school's first dean and become the first nursing school dean in the country to earn a doctoral degree. According to U.S. News & World Report, the School of Nursing at Pitt is among the top-ranked undergraduate and graduate nursing schools in the United States. The School of Nursing receives millions in funding from the National Institutes of Health, making it among the most highly funded nursing schools in the country.

== Traditions ==
=== School of Nursing pin ===
Designed by former Dean Ruth Perkins Kuehn, the pin is based on the seal of the university from 1937 until the mid-1970s and bears a candle motif, which symbolizes the role of the nurse in health care.

=== Pinning ceremony ===
The pinning ceremony, begun in 1943, marks the culmination of a student's undergraduate program of study. During the ceremony, graduates of the program are awarded their School of Nursing pin. The ceremony includes the Passing of the Light ritual, which represents graduates' commitment to the ideals of excellence in nursing practice. For each graduating class, the student with the highest academic standing is designated as Keeper of the Light and becomes its custodian until it is passed along to a member of the following class.

== Rankings ==
The Pitt School of Nursing is ranked 8th in Best Nursing Schools: Doctor of Nursing Practice in the United States, according to 2023-2024 rankings published in U.S. News & World Report's. Among the Pitt School of Nursing specialty programs ranked in the report, Nursing-Anesthesia ranked 1st, Psychiatric/Mental Health Clinical Nurse Specialist ranked 6th, pediatric nurse practitioner ranked 6th, and Adult Nurse Practitioner ranked 9th in the United States. As of 2013, the Pitt School of Nursing's on-line graduate program is ranked 9th in the United States by U.S. News & World Report. Moreover, the Pitt School of Nursing is ranked 3rd nationally in the number of research grants awarded from the National Institute of Health and in the top 10 nationally in the total amount of funding received.

== Victoria Building ==
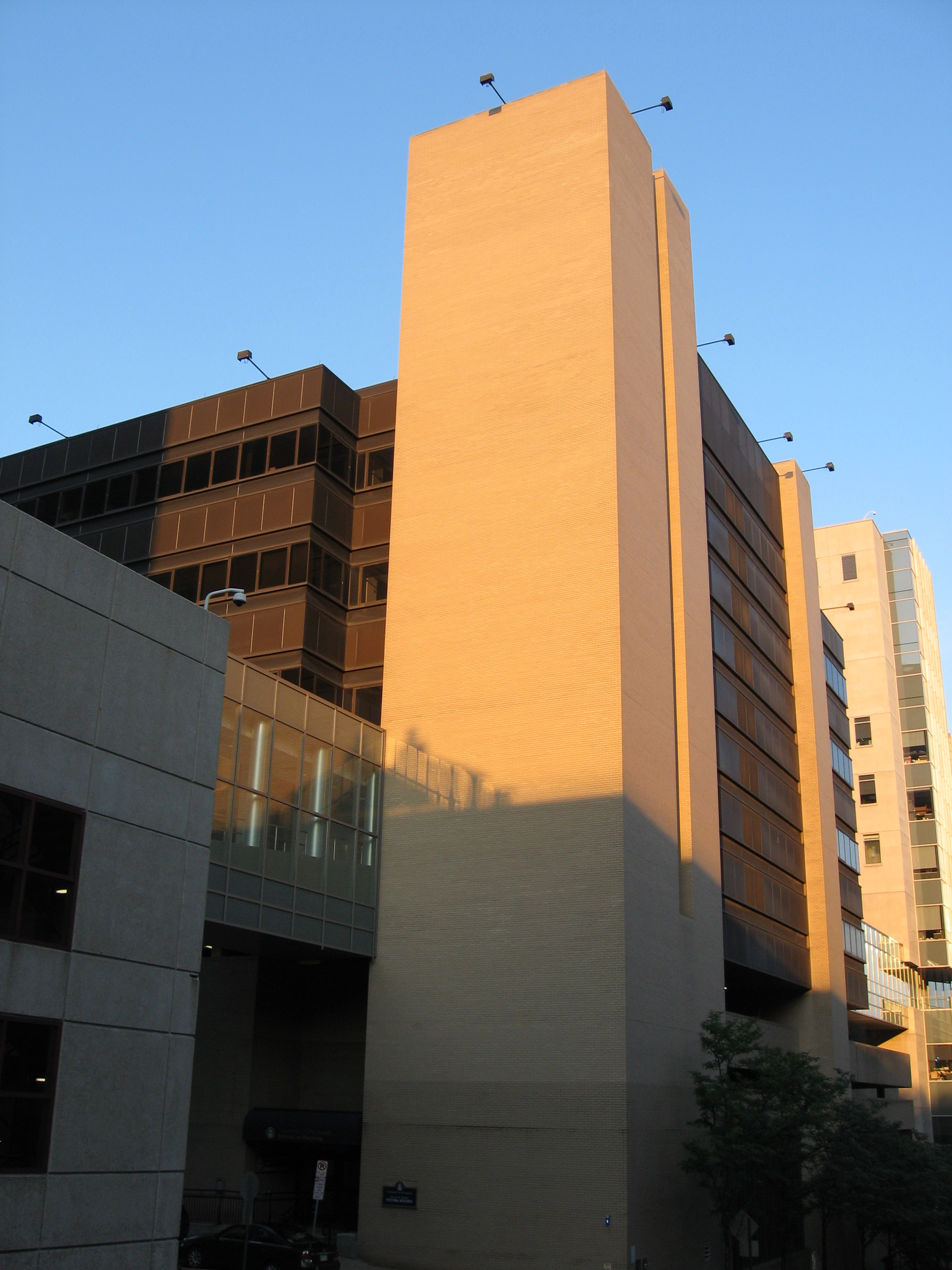
The Victoria Building

The School of Nursing was originally scattered over five locations throughout the Oakland campus of the university. In August 1977, the programs and personnel of the school were brought together in the four-story Victoria Building, also referred to as Victoria Hall, that spans the block of Victoria Street between Lothrop and Darragh streets, adjacent to the main hospitals of the University of Pittsburgh Medical Center. Designed by the architectural firm of Deeter, Ritchey, & Sippel, construction of the Victoria Building was financed by the General State Authority and the Department of General Services of the Commonwealth of Pennsylvania. The Victoria Building was formally dedicated on October 18, 1978.

A Nursing Living Learning Community is located in the Lothrop Hall residence hall across the street from the Victoria Building.

Preceded by Posvar Hall	University of Pittsburgh buildings Victoria Building; Constructed: 1977–1978	Succeeded by Mervis Hall

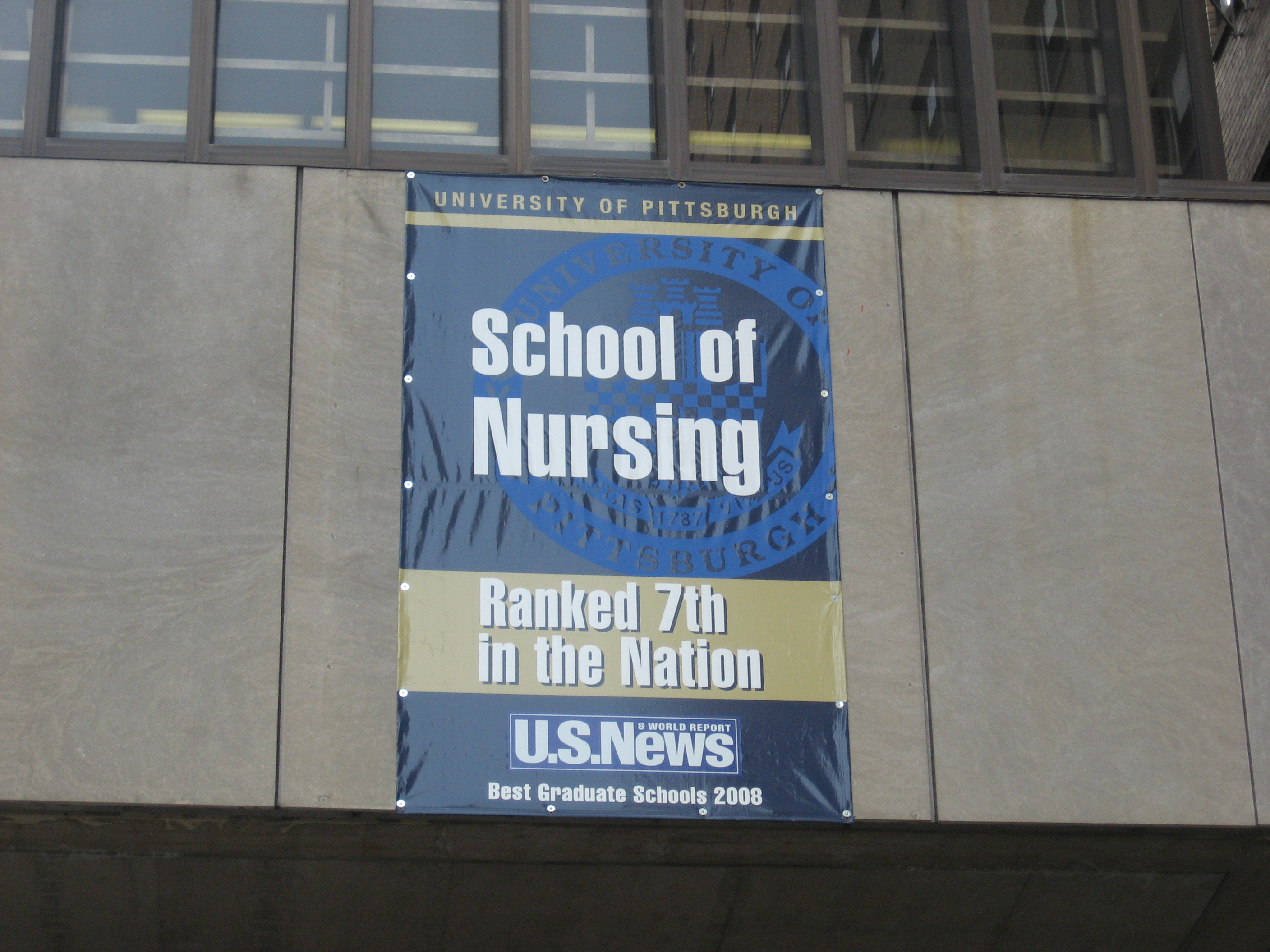
The Victoria Building bridge over Lothrop Street
