= Bellefield Hall =

- U.S. Historic district – Contributing property
- Pittsburgh Landmark – PHLF
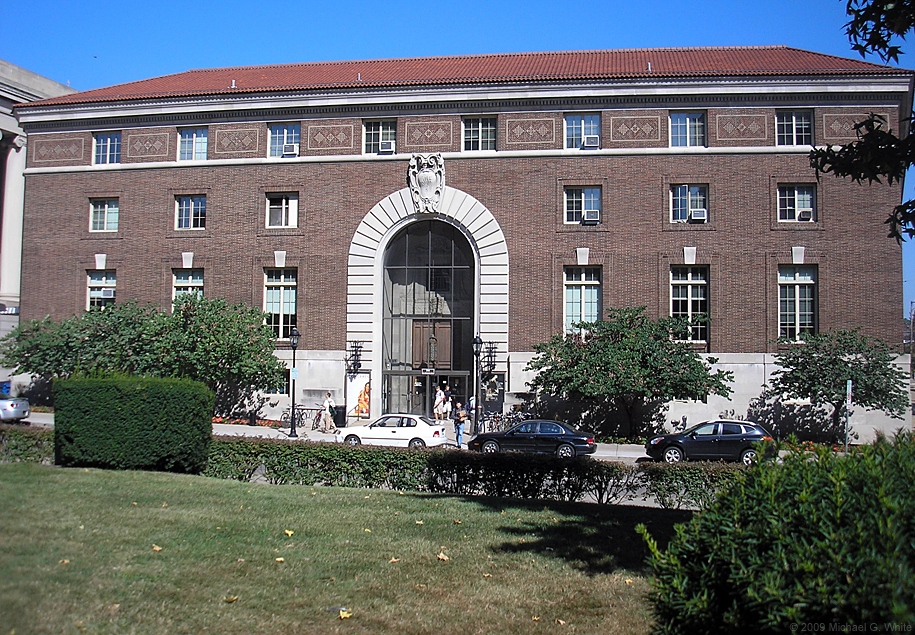
- Bellefield Hall at the University of Pittsburgh.
- Location: Pittsburgh, Pennsylvania, USA
- Coordinates: 40°26′43.49″N 79°57′3.34″W
- Built: 1924–1926
- Architect: Benno Janssen
- Architectural style: Italianate
- Part of: Schenley Farms Historic District (ID83002213)

Significant dates
- Added to NRHP: July 22, 1983
- Designated PHLF: 1992

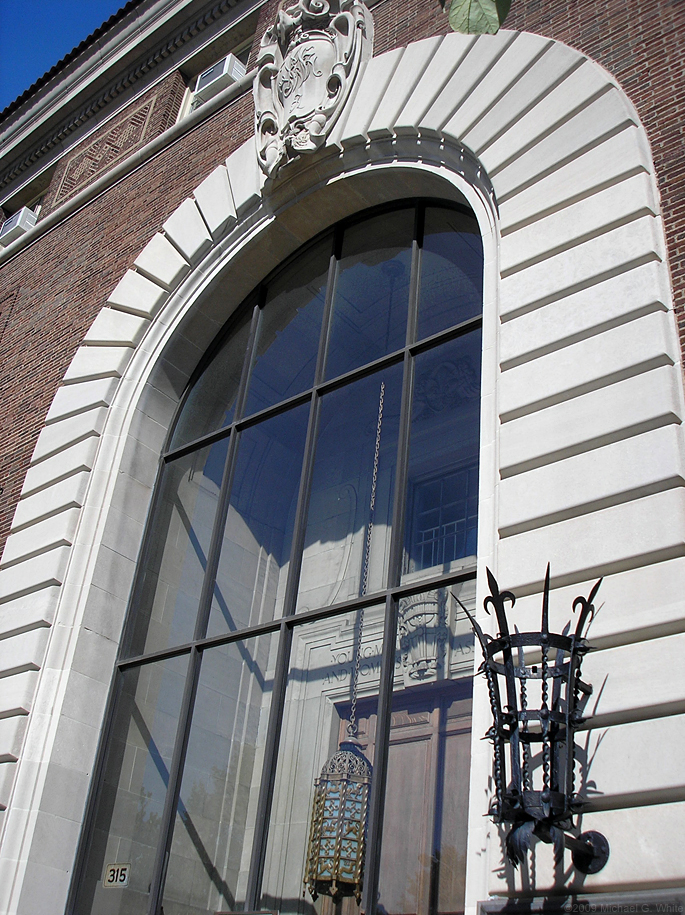
Entrance to Bellefield Hall. The iron work for the lamps was done by Samuel Yellin

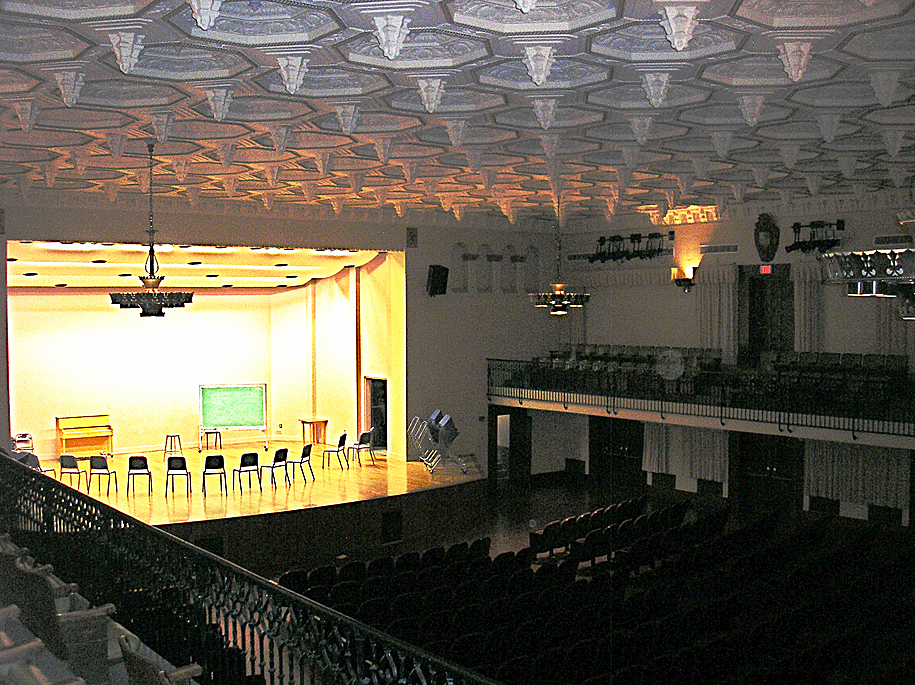
The concert hall in Bellefield Hall

Bellefield Hall is a Pittsburgh History and Landmarks Foundation Historic Landmark and is a contributing property to the Schenley Farms Historic District on the campus of the University of Pittsburgh across Bellefield Avenue from Heinz Memorial Chapel and the lawn of the university's Cathedral of Learning in Pittsburgh, Pennsylvania, USA. A 1924 Italianate structure by architect Benno Janssen, it originally served as a Young Men's and Women's Hebrew Association, but now houses rehearsal spaces, classrooms, offices, and a Digital Recording Studio for the University of Pittsburgh's Department of Music, as well as a university gymnasium, fitness center, indoor swimming pool, and a 676-seat auditorium.

== History ==
Bellefield Hall, constructed in 1924, was designed by architect Benno Janssen by combining the facades of the Italianate Palzzo Piccolomini delle Papesse in Siena with the 18th-century Lee House at Stratford in Virginia for the Flemish-bond brick finish and the high basement. Samuel Yellin was contracted to create the lanterns for the main entrance. Bellefield Hall was originally home to the Young Men's and Women's Hebrew Association (Y.M.&W.H.A.), whose patrons included Edgar Kauffman and his family, opened in 1926. Originally, the high profile of its attic hid a flat expanse of roof where Y.M.&W.H.A. patrons could sunbathe in total privacy. It also featured full sports facilities, meeting rooms, and a historic concert hall featuring Spanish stalactite ceiling and Jacobean wall moldings in which a host of musicians (including Arthur Rubinstein, Isaac Stern, and Jean-Pierre Rampal) made their Pittsburgh debuts.

The building was obtained by the University of Pittsburgh in a lease-purchase agreement in 1984 and reverted to full university ownership ten years later. Today, Bellefield Hall is a 110,000-square-foot (10,000 m^{2}) facility that is home to a variety of university offices and services. For the university's Department of Music, it houses rehearsal spaces, classrooms, graduate student offices, and the William R. Robinson Digital Recording Studio. A recently renovated 676-seat auditorium holds many of the Department of Music's recitals and concerts. Bellefield Hall also houses a sports gym, fitness center, and indoor swimming pool. The second floor fitness center was renovated and expanded in 2005. A classroom specifically designed for African-drumming music was constructed in 2008. Bellefield Hall is also home to the Collegiate YMCA at the University of Pittsburgh.

== Events ==
Bellefield Hall has hosted a number of notable events throughout its history, including concerts by the aforementioned musicians. In addition, on April 3, 2008, Republican presidential candidate Congressman Ron Paul was invited to speak at the University of Pittsburgh. He was the first 2008 presidential candidate to speak on Pitt campus (the second being Barack Obama) during the 2007–2008 academic year and the only Republican candidate to do so.

Preceded by University Place Office Building	University of Pittsburgh buildings Bellefield Hall; Constructed: 1924-1926	Succeeded by Cathedral of Learning
