= Learning Research and Development Center =

Coordinates: 40°26′40″N 79°57′32″W

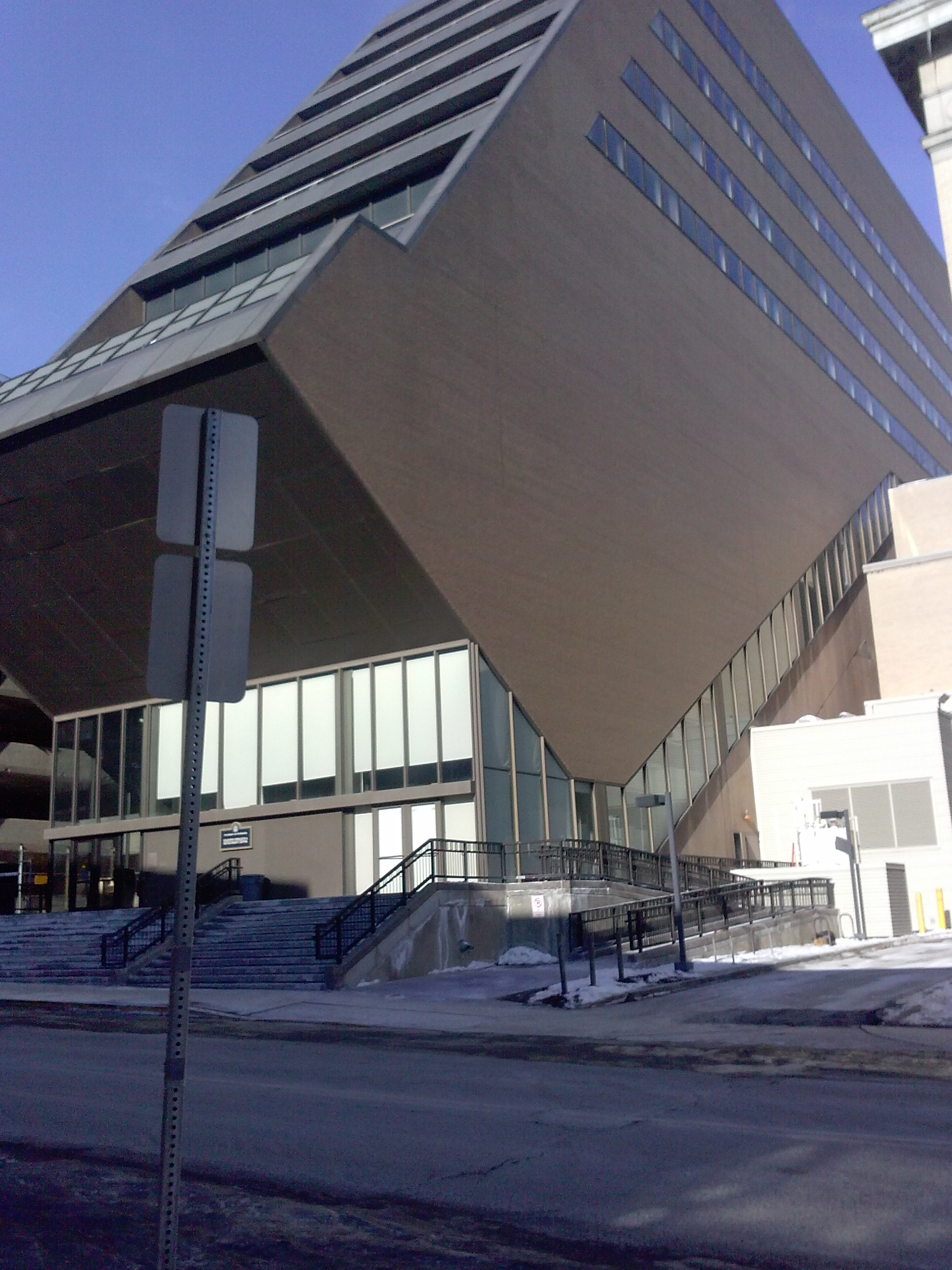
The former home of the LRDC was a Harrison & Abramovitz designed building.

The Learning Research and Development Center (LRDC) at the University of Pittsburgh is an interdisciplinary center focused on describing, understanding, improving, and researching various aspects of human cognition and learning in order to improve and reform instruction and training in schools, the workplace, and informal environments.

== Overview ==
Co-founded in 1963 by Robert Glaser and J. Steele Gow, it was among the first such centers in the world focusing on field of fundamental learning studies, and was selected for a program of the Cooperative Research Branch of the United States Office of Education as the first such center to provide a major concentration of effort in psychologically oriented education. Early funding support in 1968–1969 came by way of a $5.6 million grant ($51.8 million today) from the U.S. Office of Education for facilities and a $1.2 million grant ($11.1 million today) for program expansion from the National Science Foundation.

Currently composed of 26 faculty from across the departments and schools at the university, the center focuses on interdisciplinary approaches to research. Among the faculty are education researchers, cognitive scientists, computer scientists, developmental and social psychologists, psycholinguists, evaluation and measurement specialists, organizational behavior researchers, and education policy analysts. A supporting research staff of over 150 research associates, as well as post-doctoral fellows, graduate students, and undergraduate students, contribute to research undertaken at the LRDC. The Director of the LRDC is Charles Perfetti who succeeded Lauren Resnick who served as LRDC director from 1977 through 2008.

== Centers within LRDC ==
The LRDC hosts a number of research centers

- Pittsburgh Science of Learning Center (jointly with CMU)
- Institute for Learning
- University of Pittsburgh Center for Learning in Out-of-School Environments (UPCLOSE)
- Learning Policy Center

== Building ==
Funded in part from a $5.6 million grant awarded in 1969 from the U.S. Office of Education, the $7 million ($55.6 million today) nine-story building was designed by Harrison & Abramovitz. Winner of several architectural awards, the unique building slopes at a 45-degree angle along an upper campus hillside. Opened in 1974, it contains offices, experimental classrooms, teaching labs, demonstration areas, and lecture areas with advanced audiovisual and computer equipment. The building was demolished in 2022 for the construction of a new student recreation center and the LRDC moved into the Murdoch Building on Forbes Avenue.

== See also ==
- High-definition fiber tracking

Preceded by Chevron Science Center	University of Pittsburgh buildings Learning Research and Development Center; Constructed: 1974	Succeeded by Barco Law Building
