= Chevron Science Center =

Chemistry building at the University of Pittsburgh

Coordinates: 40°26′45″N 79°57′27″W

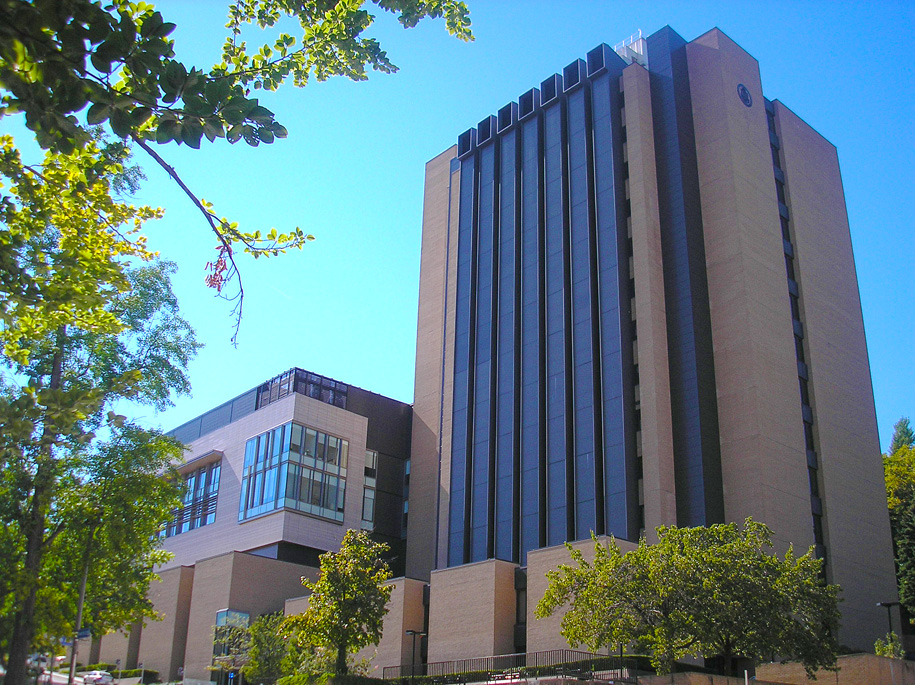
Chevron Science Center

Chevron Science Center is a landmark academic building at 219 Parkman Avenue in Pittsburgh, Pennsylvania, United States, on the campus of the University of Pittsburgh. The 15-story facility, completed in 1974, was designed by Kuhn, Newcomer & Valentour and houses the university's chemistry department. A three-story addition above Ashe Auditorium was completed in 2011.

== History ==
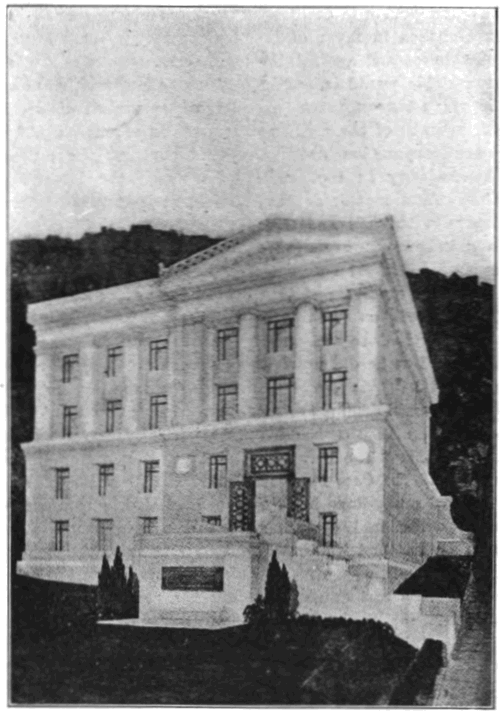
Chevron Science Center sits on the site of the university's original building in the Oakland section Pittsburgh, the former State Hall

Between 1910 and 1971, the site of Chevron Science Center had been occupied by the former State Hall, the first building erected upon Pitt's move in the early 20th century to the Oakland campus and at various times home to the university's library, administration, and engineering department. Chevron Science Center's $14.7 million cost ($106.6 million today) was partially offset by a $2 million grant ($15.4 million today) from the National Science Foundation. Its completion brought together under one roof many chemistry facilities that were, at the time, scattered among eight different buildings on Pitt's campus. Upon its completion, it was the largest school building for chemistry instruction and research east of the Mississippi River. The building also received a second place award in the "Lab of the Year" contest conducted by Industrial Research magazine. It contains a 500-seat auditorium dedicated to Lauren H. Ashe, a 1914 Pitt alumnus who was a pioneer in the pharmaceutical industry.

The building was named in recognition of Chevron Corporation's donation of its then recently acquired $100-million, 85-acre (340,000 m^{2}), fully equipped Gulf Oil Applied Research Center to the university in 1985.

In 2008, a $5.5-million overhaul of the 14th floor was completed and included the creation of new organic chemistry research laboratories. The first floor of Chevron has received a new electronic reference library and a new café The Bunsen Brewer. A $32.4 million 31,331 square-foot laboratory addition to Chevron, designed by Wilson Architects and Renaissance 3 Architects and constructed above Ashe Auditorium, was completed in 2011.

The building serves as the primary facility for the University of Pittsburgh's Department of Chemistry including its primary lecture halls, teaching laboratories, and research facilities for organic, inorganic, biological, analytical and physical chemistry; nanotechnology; alternative and renewable energy; and drug and transplant therapies.

== Mural ==
Cantini's "Science and Mankind" in the Chevron Science Center's lobby.

A 1973 Virgil Cantini porcelain enamel mural entitled "Science and Mankind" is displayed Inside Chevron Science Center near its main auditoriums. Depicting a man and woman with exposed skeletal and muscular systems touching hands, signifying the beginning of life, colors used on the figures represent different human cells with squares and triangles around them symbolize the birth of the computer age. Measuring 40 by 30 feet, it is said to be the work Cantini was most proud of.

== Department of Chemistry ==
The department of chemistry, founded in 1875, is among the nation's largest undergraduate chemistry departments. It also has awarded more than 1,000 doctorate degrees and counts among its alumni Nobel Prize-winner Paul Lauterbur, who helped develop magnetic resonance imaging (MRI). Other alumni and researchers in the department have made important discoveries in fields like recombinant DNA technology, nanotechnology, and alternative fuels, and have pioneered innovative drug and transplant therapies.

Preceded by Benedum Hall	University of Pittsburgh buildings Chevron Science Center; Constructed: 1974	Succeeded by Learning Research and Development Center
