= University Club (University of Pittsburgh) =

- U.S. Historic district – Contributing property
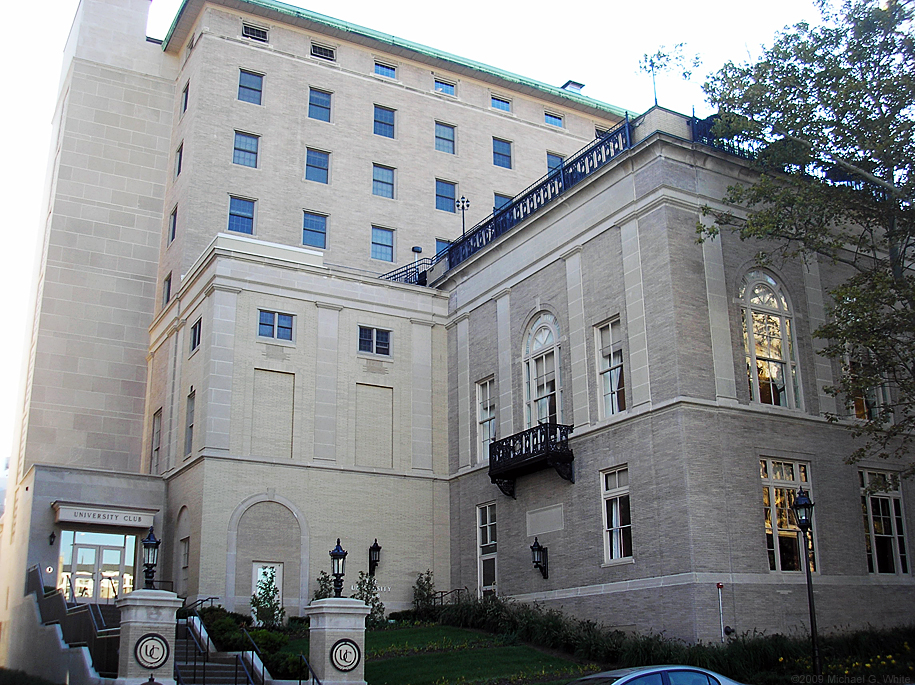
- University Club at the University of Pittsburgh
- Coordinates: 40°26′39.45″N 79°57′24.33″W
- Built: 1923; 103 years ago
- Architect: Henry Hornbostel
- Part of: Schenley Farms Historic District (ID83002213)
- Added to NRHP: July 22, 1983

The University Club is an eight-story building of the University of Pittsburgh designed by Henry Hornbostel and completed in 1923 that is a contributing property to the Schenley Farms Historic District on the school's campus in Pittsburgh, Pennsylvania, United States. It serves as a faculty club with publicly accessible dining, banquet, and conference facilities, while the upper four floors serve as undergraduate student housing referred to as University Hall.

== History ==
The building was originally home to the "University Club," a private social club established in 1890. Initially located in downtown Pittsburgh, the club was chartered to bring together college graduates who enjoyed literature, art, and other culture. It later moved to Oakland to be closer to the city's college campuses, settling into the 1923 classical-style limestone building designed by architect Henry Hornbostel. An addition to the building was constructed in 1963. After the club ceased operations in November 2004, the University of Pittsburgh purchased the building for $3.1 million in 2005 for use as a faculty club, conference center, and banquet and event facility.

== Renovation ==
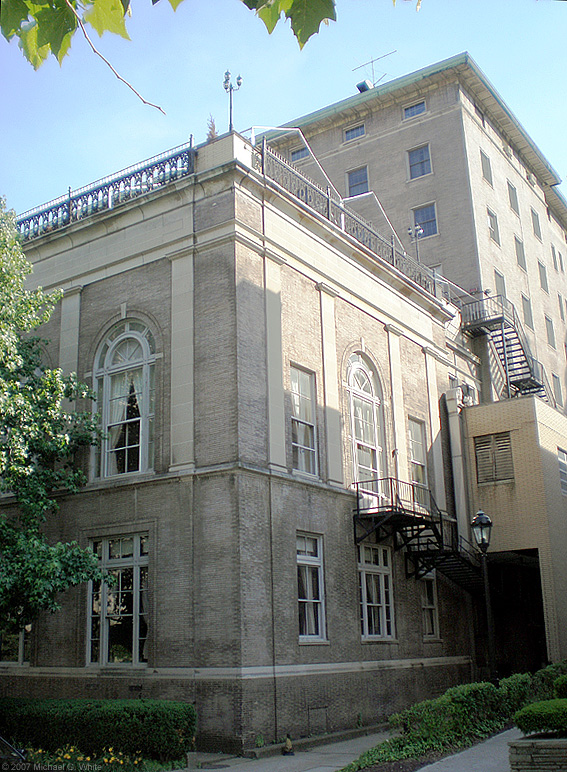
University Club from University Place prior to the renovations

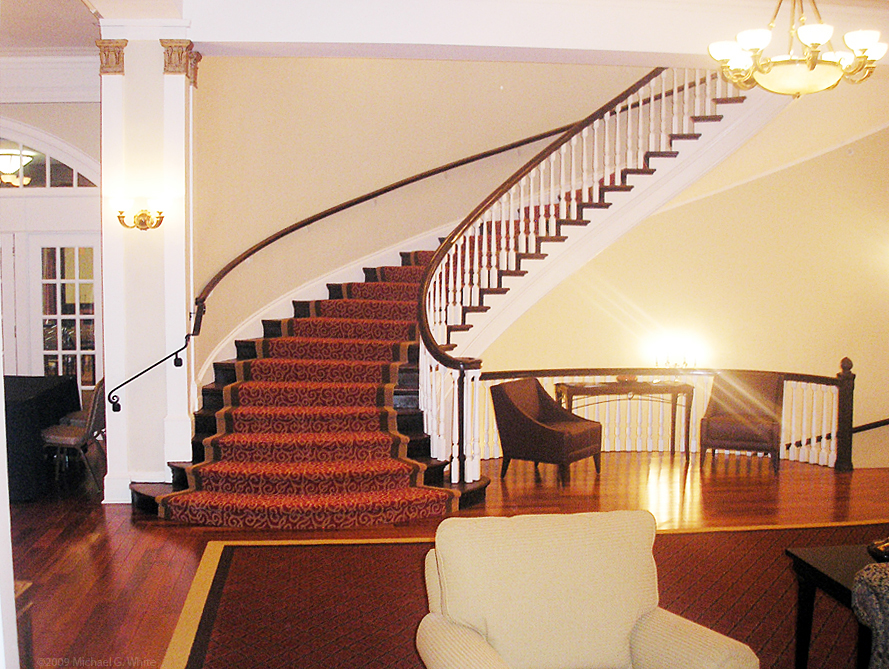
The lobby and spiral staircase

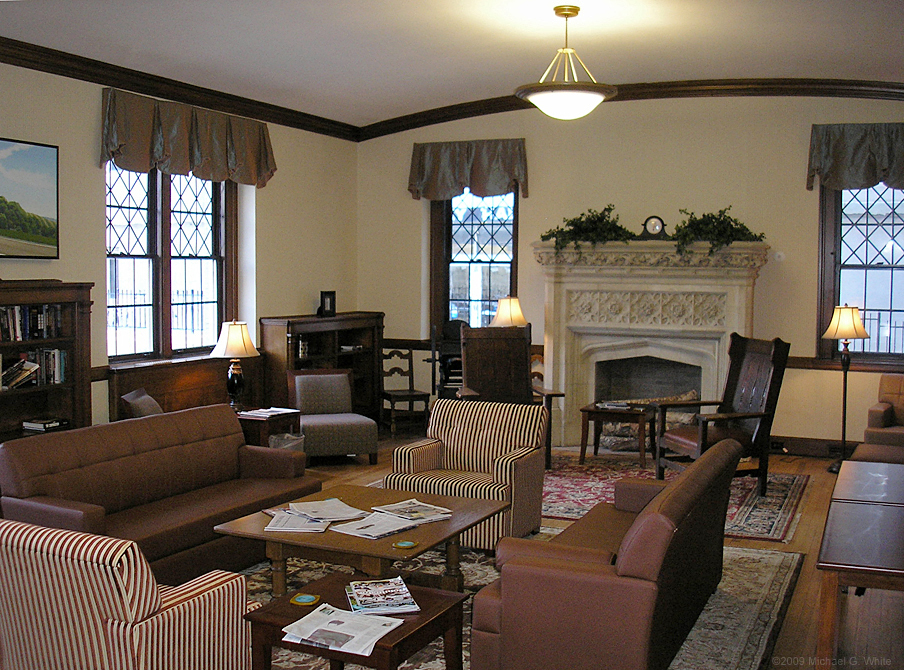
The library room

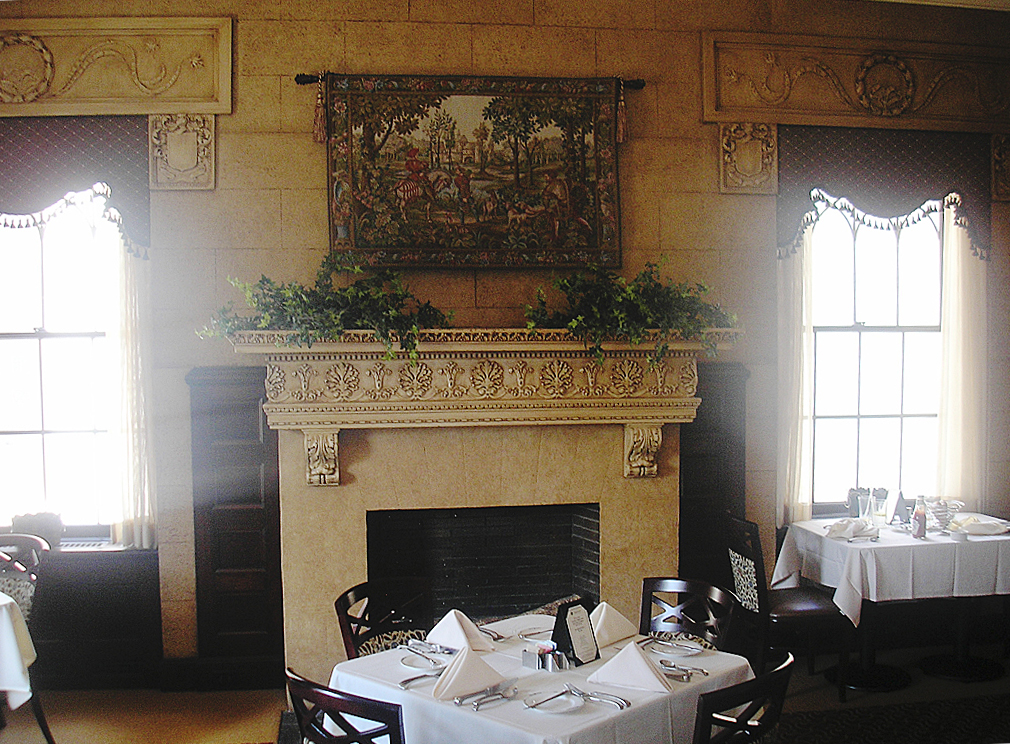
Fraternity Grill

Following acquisition of the University Club, the University of Pittsburgh conducted a $20.2 million renovation designed by Landmark Design Associates with Massaro Corporation serving as the general contractor. The renovation converted the University Club for use as a faculty club, banquet and conference facility, and for housing for families of hospital patients. The building features a grand lobby with a curved staircase, a ballroom with a 600-pound crystal chandelier, high ceilings, a library room, and 10-foot-tall (3.0 m) windows with sweeping views of the university campus. The renovation plans called for the grand lobby to remain, but renovations were to be conducted in the lounge area on the first floor. Floors 1-4 were to become a 4,000-square-foot (370 m^{2}) faculty club, 4,000-square-foot (370 m^{2}) fitness center, 18,000-square-foot (1,700 m^{2}) conference and banquet facility, 4,000-square-foot (370 m^{2}) kitchen facility, coffee shop, and 8,000 square feet (740 m^{2}) of offices. The upper floors, five through eight, have 48 guest rooms that are rented to Family House, which helps families of hospital patients with housing. Renovation was completed and the club reopened on April 1, 2009.

Members-only faculty and staff club facilities include the College Lounge for bar and casual food and the University Club's library and reading room, which are located on the first floor, as well as the Fraternity Grill for higher-end dining, located on the second floor. A professionally managed fitness center is located in the basement of the building and has separate areas for aerobics, strength and exercise equipment.

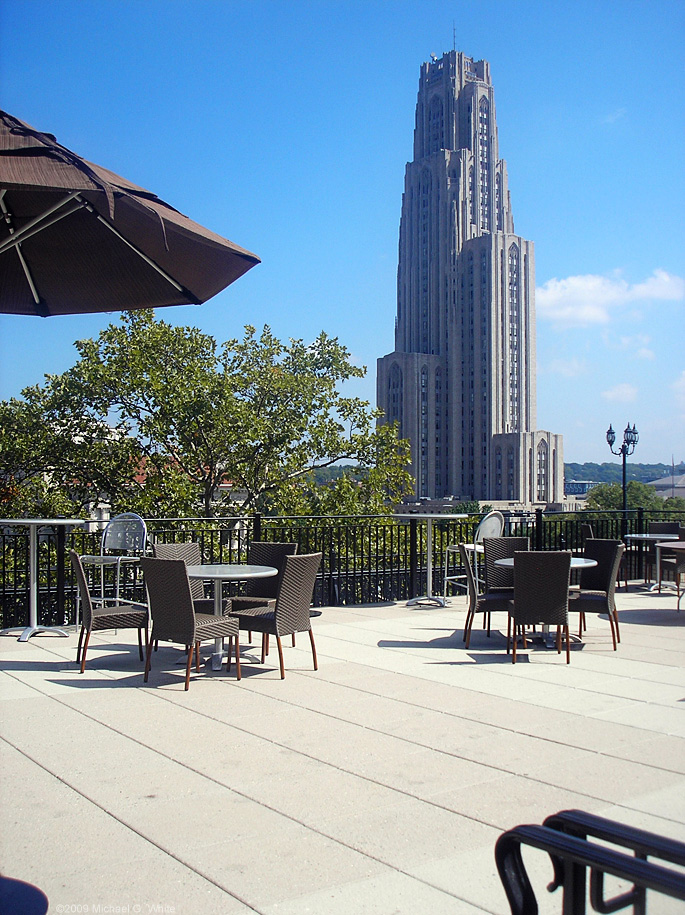
The roof terrace has a view of the university's Cathedral of Learning

Publicly accessible facilities include a first-floor Brioche Dorée French Café, banquet facilities on the second floor suited for wedding receptions and other large gatherings, second- and third-floor small and large meeting or break-out rooms available to the university and outside communities, and a restored roof terrace that will host special events.

In addition, space was renovated to accommodate the Office of Research, previously located in Thackeray Hall, as well as flexible conference facilities to accommodate up to 300 people. The building will serve within the university's educational mission with the presence of Family House, which will provide learning and outreach opportunities for students and faculty in Pitt's Schools of Medicine, Pharmacy, Health and Rehabilitation Sciences, and Social Work. Graduate students in health and physical activity will also be among the health coaches working in the fitness center.

=== Family House and student housing ===
Family House was first conceived in 1980 by the Women's Auxiliary of the American Cancer Society and the University Health Center of Pittsburgh (today known as the University of Pittsburgh Medical Center). Following its opening in 1983, it has provided a special "home away from home" for more than 100,000 patients and families who must travel to Pittsburgh for treatment of serious or life-threatening illnesses. The $4.5 million renovation of the upper four floors of the University Club for the Family House began in January 2008 and was designed by Designstream Architectural Studio, while Massaro Corporation acted as construction manager on the project. Ribbon cutting was held in late April, 2009 and guests began to be accommodated in mid-May. This was Family House's fourth location and added 48 rooms that will accommodate 4,600 guests annually.

In March 2022, Family House vacated its space in the University Club and consolidated its locations on Liberty Avenue in the Bloomfield neighborhood of Pittsburgh. The space vacated in the University Club was converted into undergraduate housing for 81 honors living learning students and named University Hall.

== Art ==
More than three dozen works of art are displayed throughout the building. Appraised at approximately $40,000, the collection includes oils, watercolors, acrylics, tapestries, etchings, prints, and photography. Approximately half the art, including tapestries and prints on canvas, was purchased by the university for specific locations in the building during the renovation. Other works are on loan from the University Art Gallery, or had once been hung in a previous, now defunct, faculty club called the Pitt Club, in the Gardner Steel Conference Center.

Ranging from mid-19th-century pieces to newly commissioned works, several of the artworks depict local scenes, including the Edgar Thomson Works by Ron Donoughe, hanging outside the library, Monongahela Incline by Tom Ruddy, hanging in the lower lobby, Early Morning Bear Run by Wang Yubao, in a vestibule near the Thackeray Street entrance, and in the club's main vestibule, a pair of Louis Orr etchings of the Cathedral of Learning and Heinz Chapel, as well as a depiction of the early 20th-century "Acropolis" plan for the campus designed by Henry Hornbostel. The most visible piece is an acrylic painting of the University Club itself that hangs behind the reception desk; it is by Bedford, Pennsylvania artist Kevin Kutz, whose Cumberland Arches also hangs in the second floor ballroom. An untitled Virgil Cantini sculpture is in a third-floor lounge. Among the new works purchased for the club are reproductions of several plates from John James Audubon’s The Birds of America.

Preceded by Ruskin Hall	University of Pittsburgh buildings University Club; Constructed: 1923	Succeeded by Schenley Quadrangle
