= Thackeray Hall =

- U.S. Historic district – Contributing property
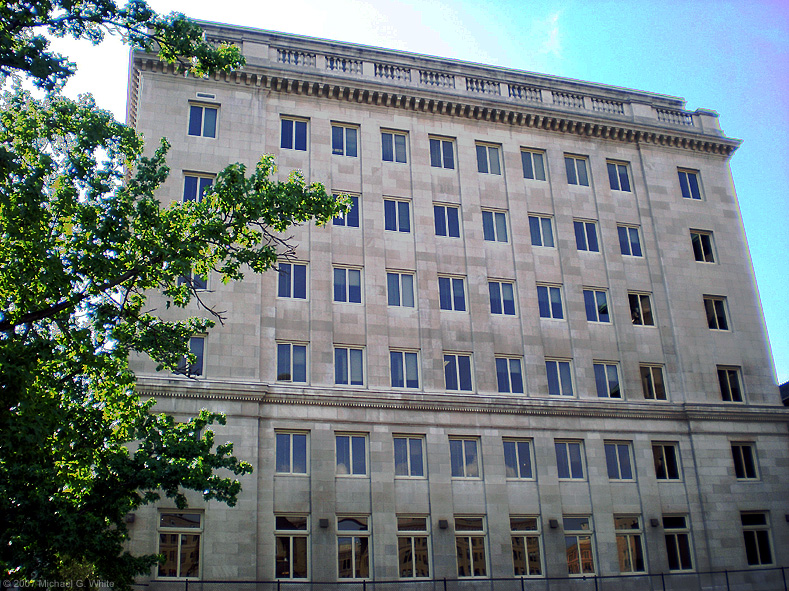
- Thackeray Hall at the University of Pittsburgh
- Coordinates: 40°26′39.54″N 79°57′26.15″W
- Area: Schenley Farms Historic District
- Built: 1923-1925
- Architect: Abram Garfield, Cleveland (son of U. S. President James Abram Garfield)
- Architectural style: Early Classical
- Part of: Schenley Farms Historic District (ID83002213)
- Added to NRHP: July 22, 1983

Thackeray Hall is an academic building of the University of Pittsburgh and a contributing property to the Schenley Farms National Historic District at 139 University Place on the campus of the University of Pittsburgh in Pittsburgh, Pennsylvania, United States.

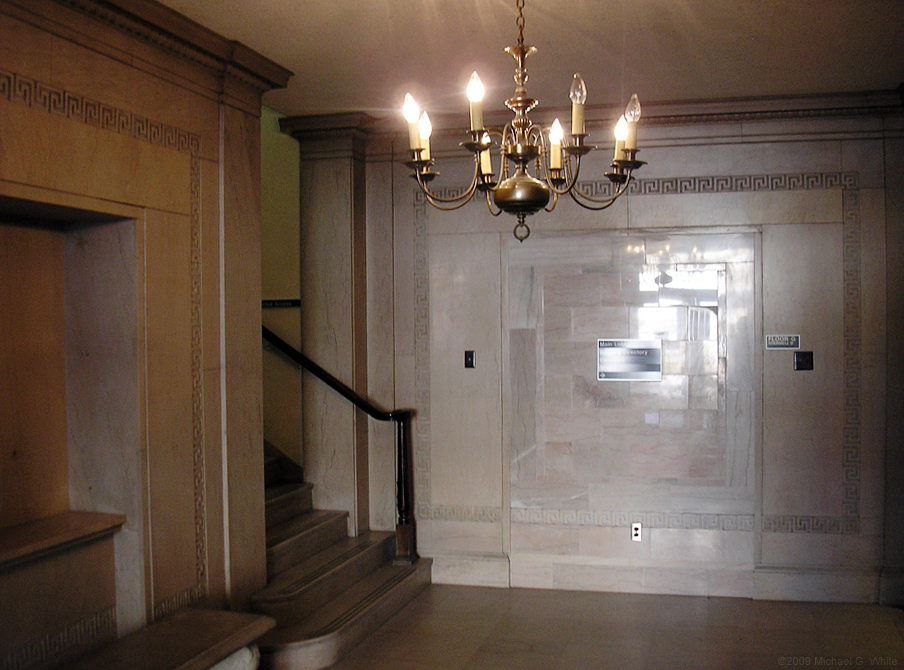
Lobby of the University Place entrance to Thackeray Hall

Thackeray Hall houses Pitt's Department of Mathematics. Previously, it housed the Mathematics Library in room 430, whose collection is now located in the Bevier Engineering Library of Benedum Hall. On the ground floor are many university student services: class registration, tuition billing, and transcripts, as well as housing the Advising Center of the School of Arts and Sciences on the second floor.

The building is the former National Union Fire Insurance Company building built circa 1923–1925 in the Early Classical style. The building was purchased by the university in 1968 for $1.875 million ($17.4 million in 2025 dollars), and was originally purposed for faculty offices. It was known as the Social Sciences Building until 1972 when it was renamed Mervis Hall and designated as the home of the Graduate School of Business. In 1983, when the Graduate School of Business moved into a new building also named Mervis Hall, it was renamed Thackeray Hall.

Preceded by Schenley Quadrangle	University of Pittsburgh buildings Thackeray Hall; Constructed: 1923-1925	Succeeded by University Place Office Building
