= Forbes Tower =

Coordinates: 40°26′25″N 79°57′27″W

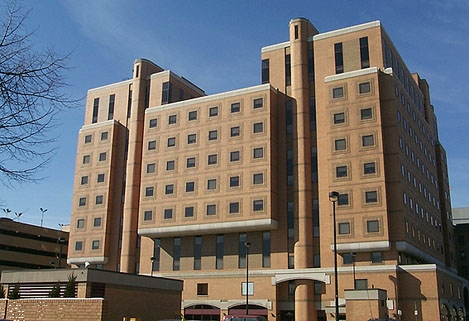
- Forbes Tower at the University of Pittsburgh Medical Center

General information
- Location: Pittsburgh, Pennsylvania, U.S.
- Cost: $55 Million
- Owner: University of Pittsburgh

Design and construction
- Architect: Tasso Katselas
- Architecture firm: Tasso Katselas Associates

Website
- www.pitt.edu

Forbes Tower is a building of the University of Pittsburgh Medical Center in Pittsburgh, Pennsylvania, United States. Located directly behind the historic Iroquois Building, Forbes Tower was designed by the architectural firm Tasso Katselas Associates and was completed in 1996 at a cost of $55 million and sits over the top of a 572-car underground parking garage. The University of Pittsburgh jointly utilizes the building, with 55,100 square feet (5,120 m^{2}) of offices, classrooms, and labs constructed on the third, fourth, fifth and sixth floors for University of Pittsburgh School of Health and Rehabilitation Sciences ($13.2 million of the project cost).

The School of Health and Rehabilitation Sciences, which moved from the now demolished Pennsylvania Hall in 1996, shares space in the building with programs and centers jointly run by it and the University of Pittsburgh Medical Center. The school's programs include clinical dietetics and nutrition, emergency medicine, communication science and disorders, health information management, athletic training, physical therapy, occupational therapy, and rehabilitation science and technology.
