= Allen L. Cook Spring Creek Preserve =

Nature reserve in Wyoming, US

Coordinates: 41°48′39″N 105°48′24″W

Allen L. Cook Spring Creek Preserve is a 4,700-acre (19 km^{2}) nature reserve considered to be one of the richest cache of undisturbed dinosaur fossils in North America. It is located near the village of Rock River, Wyoming some 40 miles (64 km) northwest of Laramie. The Preserve contains the outcrops of the Morrison, Sundance, and Cloverly formations.

The preserve was established in December 2005 when rancher Allen L. Cook donated the land to the University of Pittsburgh, which uses it for research and educational purposes, in partnership with the Carnegie Museum of Natural History and the University of Wyoming.

The University of Pittsburgh Honors College typically offers field study in paleontology, ecology, and archaeology as well as intensive are courses in conjunction with the Department of Studio Arts.
