= Schenley Quadrangle =

Residence halls at the University of Pittsburgh

- U.S. Historic district – Contributing property
- Pittsburgh Landmark – PHLF
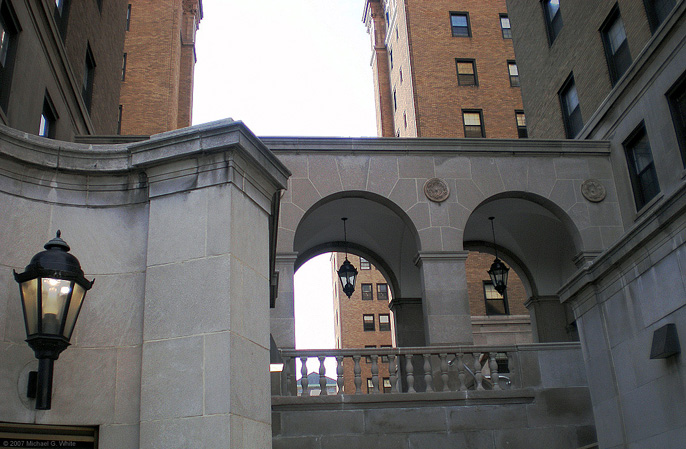
- Forbes Avenue entrance to Schenley Quadrangle
- Location: Pittsburgh, Pennsylvania, USA
- Coordinates: 40°26′35.64″N 79°57′20.79″W
- Area: Schenley Farms Historic District
- Built: June 3, 1922–1924
- Architect: Henry Hornbostel with collaboration from Rutan & Russell and Eric Fisher Wood
- Part of: Schenley Farms Historic District (ID83002213)

Significant dates
- Added to NRHP: July 22, 1983
- Designated PHLF: 1972

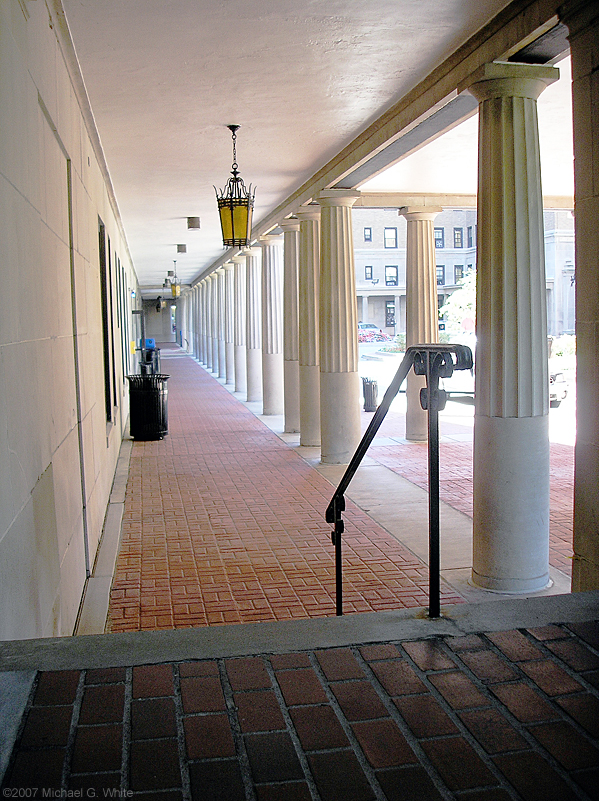
A view of the Schenley Quadrangle colonnade along McCormick Hall. Holland Hall can be seen towards the back.

Schenley Quadrangle is a cluster of University of Pittsburgh ("Pitt") residence halls that is a Pittsburgh History and Landmarks Foundation Historic Landmark and are contributing properties to the Schenley Farms National Historic District in Pittsburgh, Pennsylvania, United States.

The five residence halls are the former historic Schenley Apartments, designed by Henry Hornbostel with collaboration from Rutan & Russell and Eric Fisher Wood, for developer Franklin Nicola; they were built between 1922 and 1924 at a cost of more than $4.5 million ($85 million in 2025 dollars). Originally, the Schenley Apartments were home of Pittsburgh's well-to-do (including for a time their architect Henry Hornbostel) and consisted of 1,113 rooms in 238 apartments across the five buildings. The university acquired them in December 1955 at a cost of $3 million ($36.1 million in 2025 dollars), renovating them into residence halls for another $1 million ($11.8 million in 2025 dollars). By 1957–1958, 101 female students had moved into 20 apartments in Building F (now called Brackenridge Hall).

Today, Schenley Quadrangle consists of five Pitt residence halls: Amos Hall, Brackenridge Hall, Bruce Hall, Holland Hall, and McCormick Hall.

Previously a vehicle drop-off area and parking lot, the courtyard between these buildings was converted to a public open space with landscaping and exterior furniture in 2018; a raised platform was built for performances or other events. The renovation cost $5 million, with another $5 million spent on the parking garage beneath it.

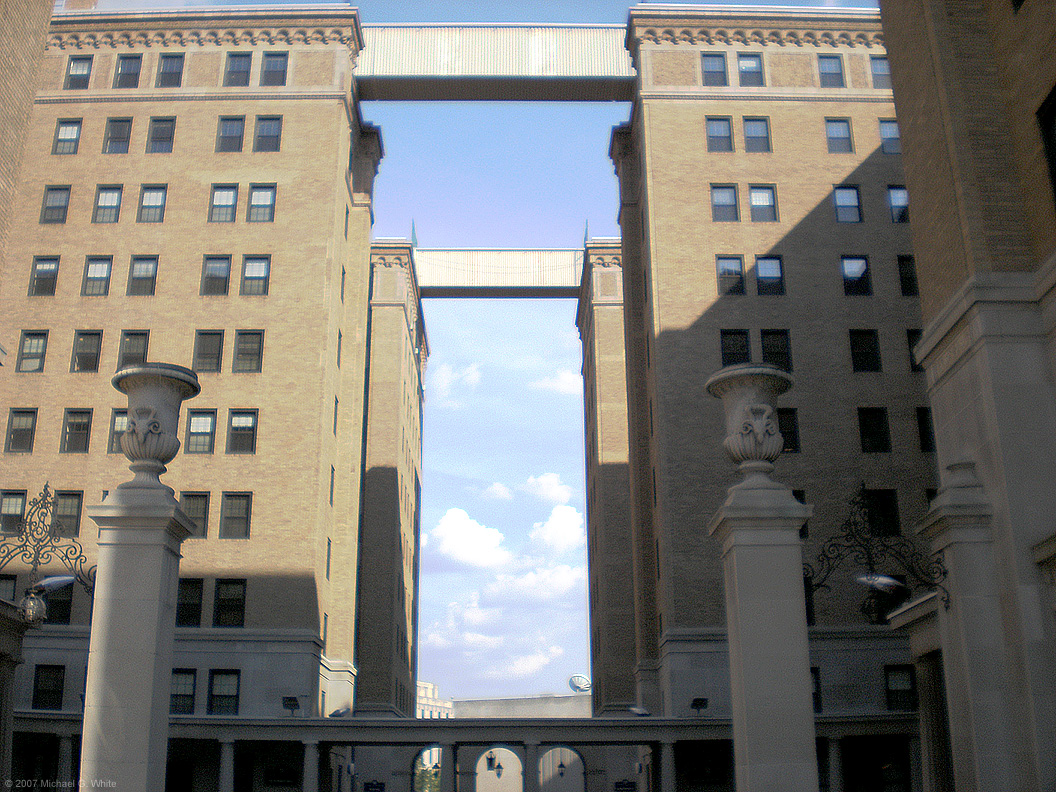
Schenley Quadrangle, as seen from its Fifth Avenue entrance. McCormick Hall is on the left, and the south wing of Holland Hall is on the right.

== Amos Hall ==
Amos Hall houses nine sororities, each on their own separate floor. There are 152 upper class female residents living in sorority suites that feature a kitchen, bathrooms, living room, chapter room, and bedrooms. Laundry facilities are in the penthouse. In 2008, Pitt approved a $9.1 million renovation of Amos Hall that included air conditioning; updated energy efficient electrical and water systems; and updated bedrooms, bathrooms, and kitchens that were redesigned to be compatible with the pre-existing architectural structure. Completed and reopened for the Fall 2009 term, input from each sorority gave every floor its own style.

The Forbes Street street level retail portion of the building is currently occupied by a Starbucks, but was previously Oakland Bakery and Market, preceded by a fitness center, which was preceded by a bank.

The building is named for Thrysa W. Amos, the university's dean of women from 1919 to 1941.

== Brackenridge Hall ==
Brackenridge Hall houses 210 mostly upperclass men and women in three-, four- and five-person suites. Each suite features a MicroFridge and a private bathroom; a few single and double rooms do not include a MicroFridge. Laundry facilities are located in the penthouse. Brackenridge Hall also features a fitness center (relocated from Amos Hall in 2013) that is available to all residents of Schenley Quadrangle.

In Fall 2012, the university's Honors College established Brackenridge Hall as an honors dormitory.

The Pitt Shop, a university owned store selling University of Pittsburgh branded clothing and merchandise, is on the street level of the building on Fifth Avenue.

The building is named for Hugh Henry Brackenridge, the founder of the university.

== Bruce Hall ==
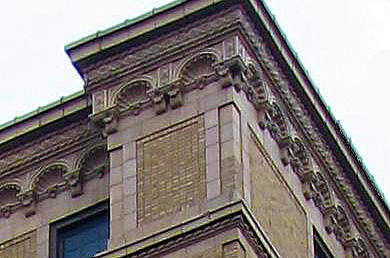
Detail of the scalloped cornice on Bruce Hall, one of the Schenley Quadrangle residences at the University of Pittsburgh

Bruce Hall houses 212 primarily first year male and female students in four- and six-person suites. Starting in 2014–2015, Bruce Hall became home to the College of Business Administration's first year student Living Learning Community. The building is named for Robert Bruce, the first chancellor after the university was renamed from the Pittsburgh Academy to the Western University of Pennsylvania. Until 1978, Bruce Hall served as a university office building; at that time, those offices were relocated to Posvar Hall, thereby allowing Bruce Hall to be converted into student housing.

=== Basement and First Floor ===
The basement and first floor of Bruce Hall are level with the street at Forbes Avenue. In 2021, these retail spaces are occupied by The UPS Store and Forbes Street Market, which was established in 2018 by the university and Sodexo, but is now run by Compass, who has had the university's dining contract since July 2020. The space was previously occupied by a 7-Eleven, which closed in the Fall 2017.

=== Second Floor ===
The second floor is the main entrance for residents, as well as the location of the University of Pittsburgh Business and Auxiliary Services offices.

=== Third through Eleventh Floors ===
The third through eleventh floors are entirely student residential suites. Each floor has 6 suites: 3 four-person suites, 2 three-person suites, and 1 six-person suite with laundry facilities on each floor. The 6-person suites on the upper floors have an exceptional view of the Cathedral of Learning, Schenley Plaza, and the Carnegie Museum of Natural History from the common room's windows.

=== Twelfth Floor ===
The twelfth floor is home to the university's special events and catering services, including a meeting room in suite 1201 reserved for activities held by the president or vice president of the university. It was previously impossible to get to the twelfth floor without an elevator key, though recent access to the twelfth floor has not been as restrictive as in the past.

A five bedroom, four-bath suite on the twelfth floor of Bruce Hall also once served as the university's Chancellor residence.

=== The Ghost of 1201 Bruce Hall ===
Many students, university employees, and various outside sources believe that a ghost or two haunts the 1201 suite of Bruce Hall. The owner of the Schenley Apartments once lived with his family on the twelfth floor. Rumor has it that his mistress and/or wife committed suicide in the 1201 suite by either hanging herself or throwing herself out the window. Students and staff have reported hearing footsteps in the stairwells and the halls, as well as a woman's voice. Some have reported poltergiest-like activity, and past student residents have heard stories about the elevators not stopping on their floor, instead continuing up to the twelfth floor and refusing to go back down. Traditionally referred to as "Harriet," the ghost (for whom Pitt staff have even hung Christmas stockings for) has only been known to visit the 12th floor, the 11th floor, and suite 8B on the 8th floor (where she is said to have lived).

== Holland Hall ==
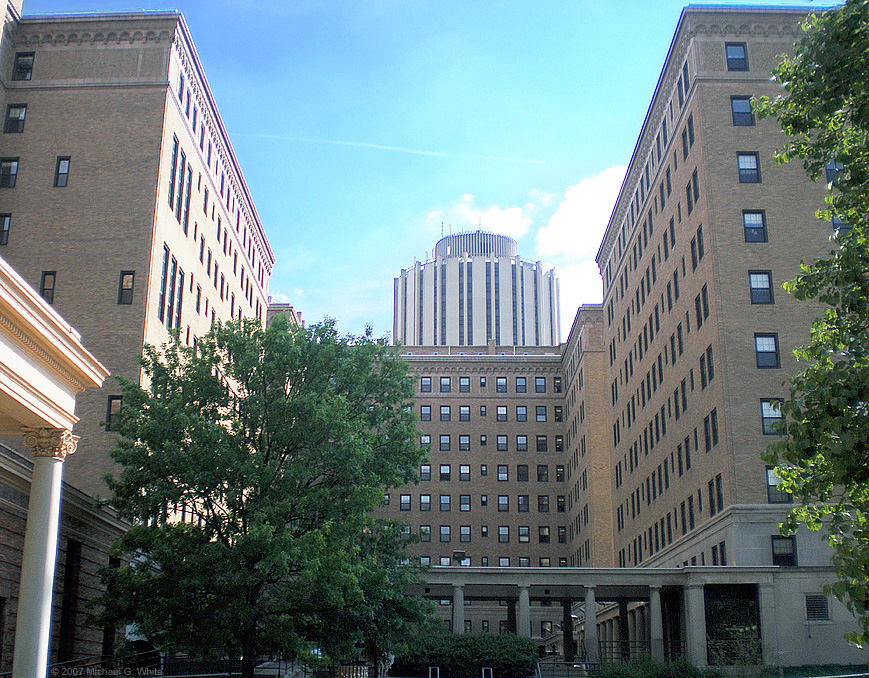
Schenley Quadrangle at the University of Pittsburgh as viewed from the Fifth Avenue side of the William Pitt Union (column in left foreground). Holland Hall is directly ahead, McCormick Hall is to the left, and Amos Hall is to the right. The top of Litchfield Tower B can be seen behind Holland Hall.

Holland Hall is divided into two wings, North and South, and houses 600 upperclass and first-year males and females in single, double, triple, and quad accommodations; prior to 2017 it was a women only dormitory. On each floor there is a kitchenette and communal bathrooms and showers. The penthouse features a lounge, study area, and laundry facilities. It originally served as a men's dormitory.

Since January, 1960, the University Store, the primary book store for the university, has been located on the ground floor of Holland Hall, accessible from either the Schenley Quadrangle or from Fifth Avenue. At the time of its opening, it was hailed as the largest college bookstore in the nation. The store completed a $9.43 million renovation that included insertion of a skylight, a café, a technology area, an Espresso Book Machine, and various reading nooks, as well as the creation of a new entrance on the Forbes Avenue side of Holland Hall.

Holland Hall is named after University Chancellor William Jacob Holland, who led the university from 1891 to 1901 when it was known as the Western University of Pennsylvania.

== McCormick Hall ==
McCormick Hall houses 132 mostly upperclass men and women in two-, three-, five-, and seven-person suites. Each suite features one or more private bathrooms and a kitchenette with refrigerator. Laundry facilities are available in the penthouse. The William Pitt Union is adjacent to McCormick Hall.

McCormick Hall is named after Samuel B. McCormick, who served as University Chancellor from 1904 to 1921, during which time the university moved from Pittsburgh's North Side to its current location in the neighborhood of Oakland, also changing its name from the Western University of Pennsylvania to the University of Pittsburgh.

== Namesakes ==
When still the Schenley Apartments, the buildings in Schenley Quad were simply named "A", "B", "C", "D", and "F". After their acquisition by the university for student residences, each building was eventually renamed for important figures in the university's history.

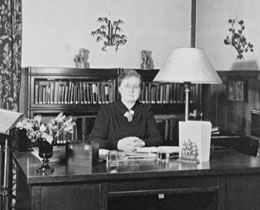
Thyrsa Amos
Dean of Women
1919–1941

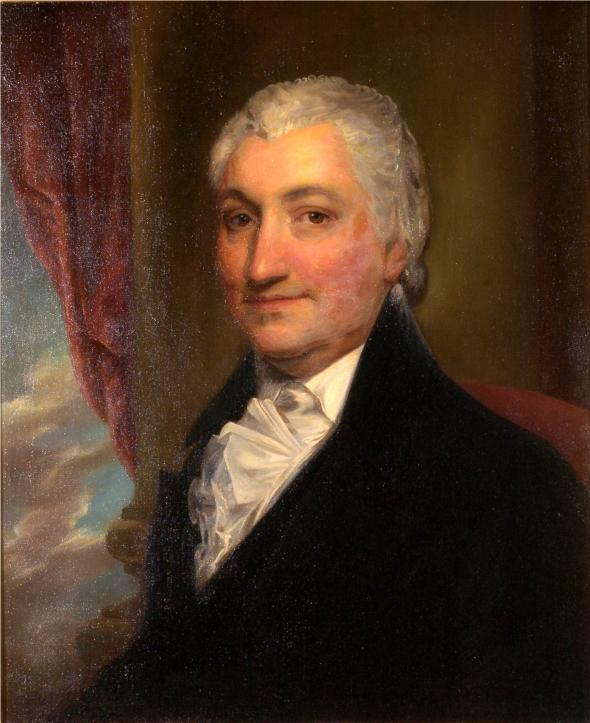
Hugh Henry Brackenridge
University founder
1787

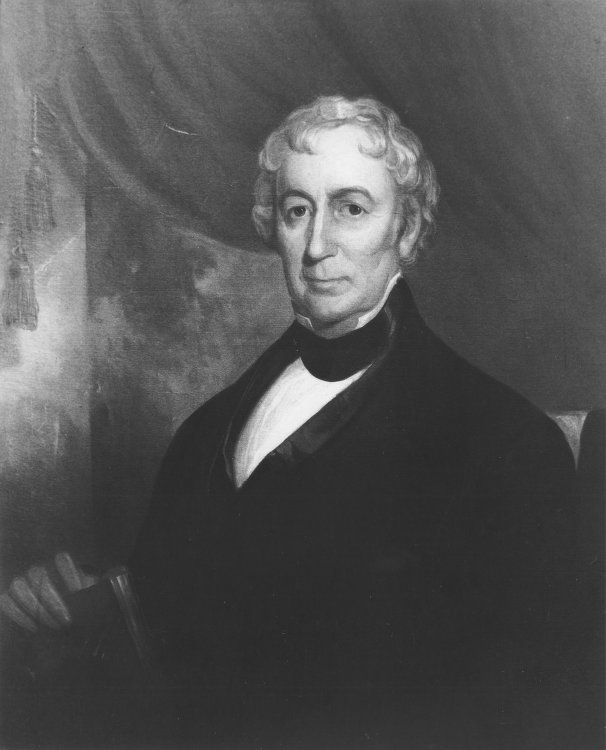
Robert Bruce
Chancellor
1819–1835; 1836–1843

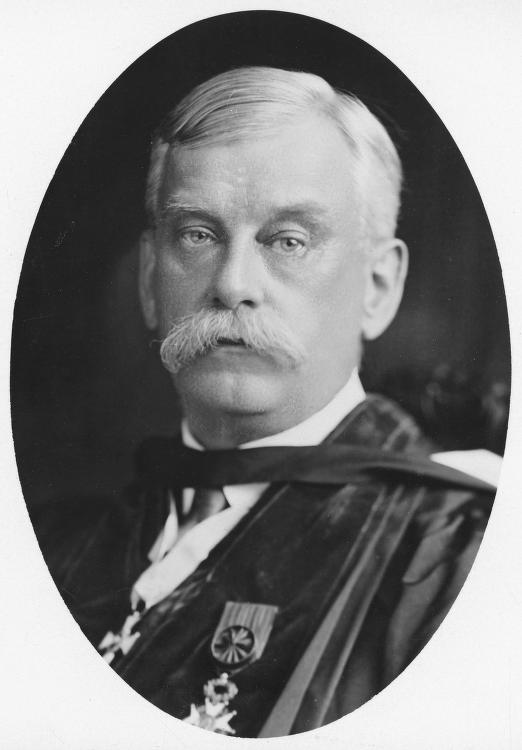
William Jacob Holland
Chancellor
1891–1901

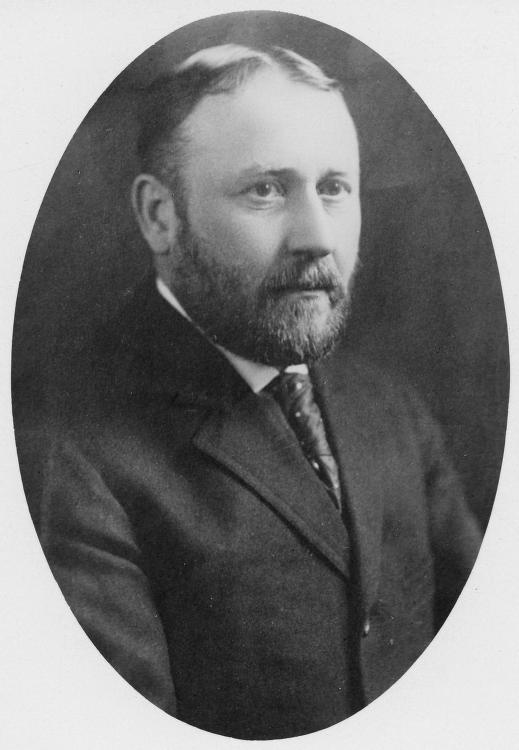
Samuel McCormick
Chancellor
1904–1921

Preceded by University Club	University of Pittsburgh buildings Schenley Quadrangle; Constructed: 1922-1924	Succeeded by Thackeray Hall
