= University Place Office Building =

- U.S. Historic district – Contributing property
- University Place Building at the University of Pittsburgh
- Coordinates: 40°26′38.75″N 79°57′23.02″W
- Built: 1924
- Architect: Edward B. Lee and associate architect J. B. Blair
- Architectural style: Renaissance revival
- Demolished: 2011
- Part of: Schenley Farms Historic District (ID83002213)
- Added to NRHP: July 22, 1983

University Place Office Building was a 6-story building constructed in 1924 and had been a contributing property to the Schenley Farms National Historic District on the campus of the University of Pittsburgh in Pittsburgh, Pennsylvania, United States. Once located at 121 University Place (originally Natalie Avenue), the building was originally the Schenley Office Physicians Building designed by architect Edward B. Lee and associate architect J. B. Blair for the Physicians Land Company. Long housing offices of physicians associated with the university's medical school and medical center, the building was acquired by the university in June 1983 for $1.25 million and then housed a variety of university offices, including the University Center for Social and Urban Research, until its demolition in 2011.

== University Center for Social and Urban Research (UCSUR) ==
In its final years of use by the university, the University Center for Social and Urban Research (UCSUR) was housed within the University Place Office Building. Established in 1972, the UCSUR serves as a resource for researchers and educators interested in basic and applied social and behavioral sciences and serves as a hub for interdisciplinary research and collaboration. Research of the UCSUR focuses on five principal areas including urban and regional analysis, survey research, qualitative data analysis, gerontology, and environmental decision support. The center also offers a graduate certificate in gerontology. In early 2009 the center opened a multipurpose data center which is HIPAA and FISMA compliant. The UCSUR data center is monitored 24/7 by the UCSUR Information Technology department. The data center maintains a 99.3% up time as of the summer of 2010.

== Replacement with Nordenberg Hall ==
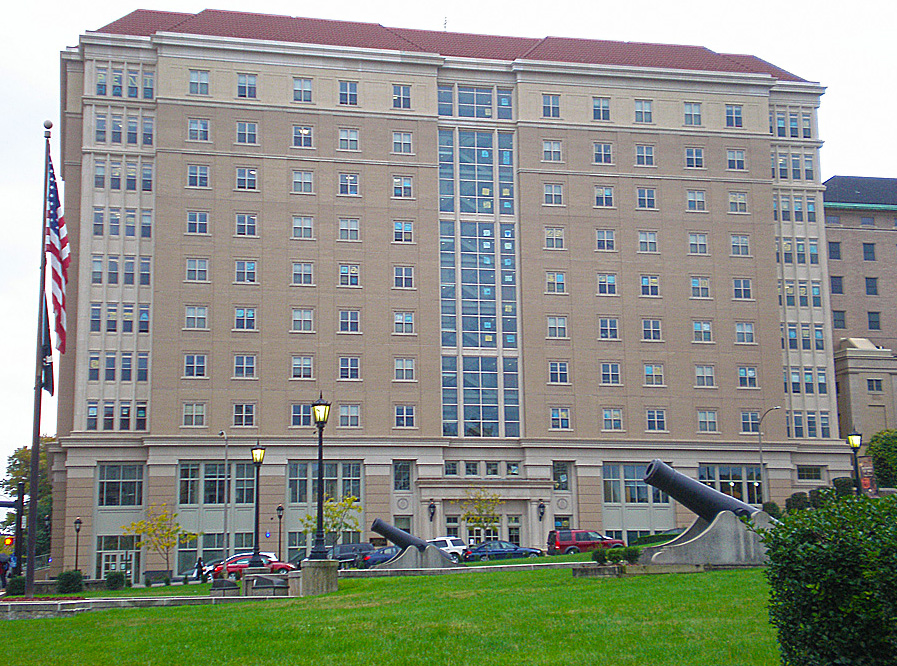
Nordenberg Hall on the former site of the University Place Office Building

University Office Place was demolished in August 2011, following the approval from the Pittsburgh Historic Review Commission, to make way for a new $59 million, 10-story, 559-bed university residence hall, named Nordenberg Hall that was designed by Mackey Mitchell Architects of St. Louis along with the Pittsburgh-based firm MacLachlan, Cornelius & Filoni Inc. Nordenberg Hall, which opened for the 2013 fall semester, occupies the former footprints of 121 University Place and its former adjacent parking lot at the corner of Fifth Avenue and University Place. Former University Office Place resident UCSUR was relocated to the Gold Building (3343 Forbes Ave). Nordenberg Hall includes ground floor retail space, a university pharmacy, and a second floor student wellness and counseling center. The residence hall also contains two sound-proof music practice rooms, and on the third floor, a fitness room and an outdoor rooftop terrace. The residence hall features 200-square-foot (19 m^{2}) double-occupancy rooms that are equipped with small refrigerators, microwave ovens, and flat-screen TVs. Communal social spaces, study lounges, and bathrooms were intentionally designed to encourage students to leave their rooms to interact with other students and gain a sense of connectedness. The residence hall was named in honor of Mark Nordenberg, the university's previous chancellor who retired in August, 2014.

== In literature ==
University Place Office Building is the namesake and a location setting of a book published in 2007 by Louis Panesi entitled 121 University Place: A Father's Abuse / A Doctor's Love.

Preceded by Thackeray Hall	University of Pittsburgh buildings University Place Office Building; Constructed: 1924	Succeeded by Bellefield Hall
