= Benedum Hall =

Building on the University of Pittsburgh campus

Coordinates: 40.443811°N 79.958488°W

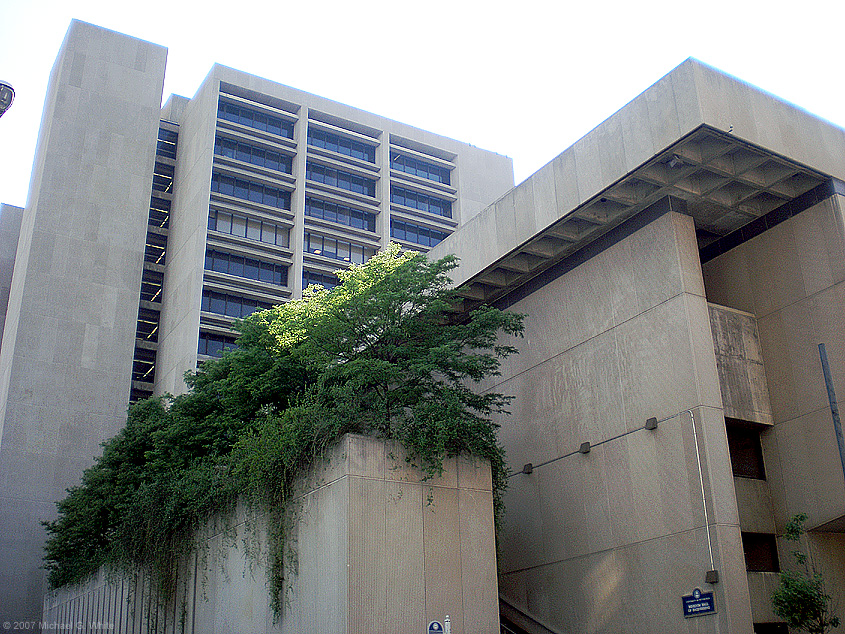
Benedum Hall and the Engineering Auditorium (in the foreground) at the University of Pittsburgh.

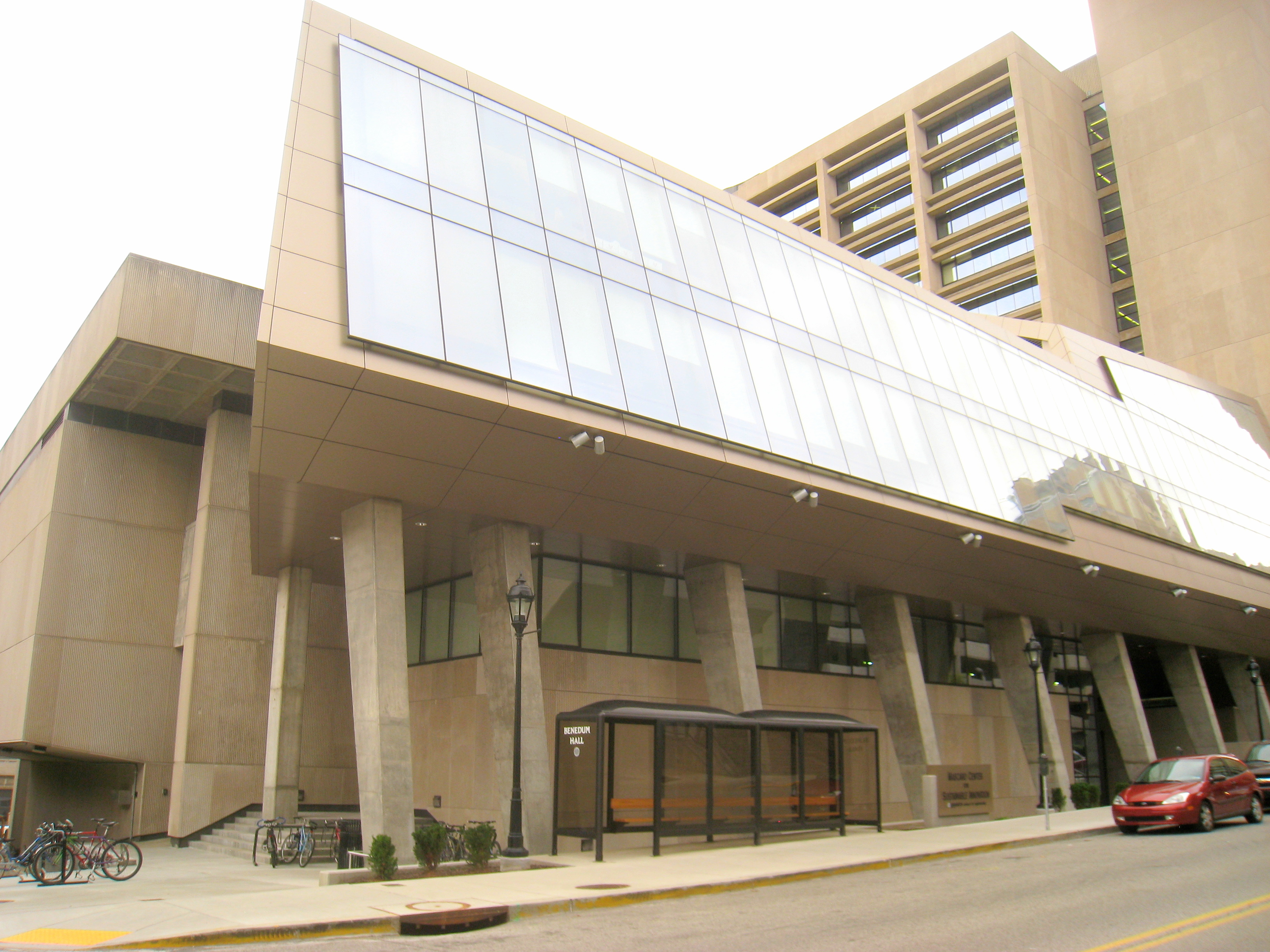
The addition of the Mascaro Center for Sustainable Innovation to the Benedum Hall

Michael L. Benedum Hall of Engineering is a landmark academic building on the campus of the University of Pittsburgh in Pittsburgh, Pennsylvania, United States. The building was designed in the brutalist style by the architectural firm of Deeter, Ritchey, and Sippel and completed in 1971 at a cost of $15 million ($119.2 million today). The building was honored with both the Pennsylvania Society American Institute of Architects Honor Award and Distinguished Building Award. It was built with a gift from the Claude Worthington Benedum Foundation and funds from the General State Authority. It stands on a 1.8-acre (7,300 m^{2}) site that was formerly occupied by the National Guard's Logan Armory.

It is fifteen stories (two below ground) and has 419,000 square feet (38,900 m^{2}) of space. It is home to the Swanson School of Engineering and contains classrooms, laboratories, offices, conference and seminar rooms, and is home to the George M. Bevier Engineering Library which serves not only the engineering school, but also the Department of Physics and Astronomy and Department of Geology and Planetary Science. The wall panel behind the circulation desk of the library features a mural carved by Edward Catich. Benedum Hall also includes a computer lab and an Einstein's Express.

A $60 million Benedum Hall renovation and expansion project was launched in 2008. A new addition, a $16 million, 42,000-square-foot (3,900 m^{2}) LEED designed structure for the Mascaro Center for Sustainable Innovation, now connects what was previously the Engineering Auditorium to the second and third floor of the main tower across the previous existing plaza. Originally an essentially separate building only connected by the ground, basement, and sub-basement levels, the auditorium was reconfigured from its original 528-seat space into five separate classrooms. The Mascaro Center moved into its new accommodations in August 2009. In 2012, the Mascaro Center addition to Benedum Hall won the International Concrete Reinforcing Steel Institute Design Award in the Educational Facility Category. In addition, the library, computer lab, and club offices moved to the ground and basement levels, administrative offices shifted to the first floor, and other floors of the tower were renovated. A $39.9 million Phase II of renovations to the subbasement, 3rd, 6th, 7th, and 8th floors, as well as the creation of a new 8,000-square-foot (740 m^{2}) mezzanine level, was approved in November, 2010. Renovations creating an energy innovation floor on floor eight were completed in 2013.

Former President, CIA Director, and Ambassador George H. W. Bush spoke at the hall during a March 15, 1979 meeting.

== See also ==
- Swanson School of Engineering

Preceded by Crawford Hall	University of Pittsburgh buildings Benedum Hall; Constructed: 1971	Succeeded by Chevron Science Center
