= Stephen Foster Collection and archive =

Coordinates: 40.44383°N 79.95276°W

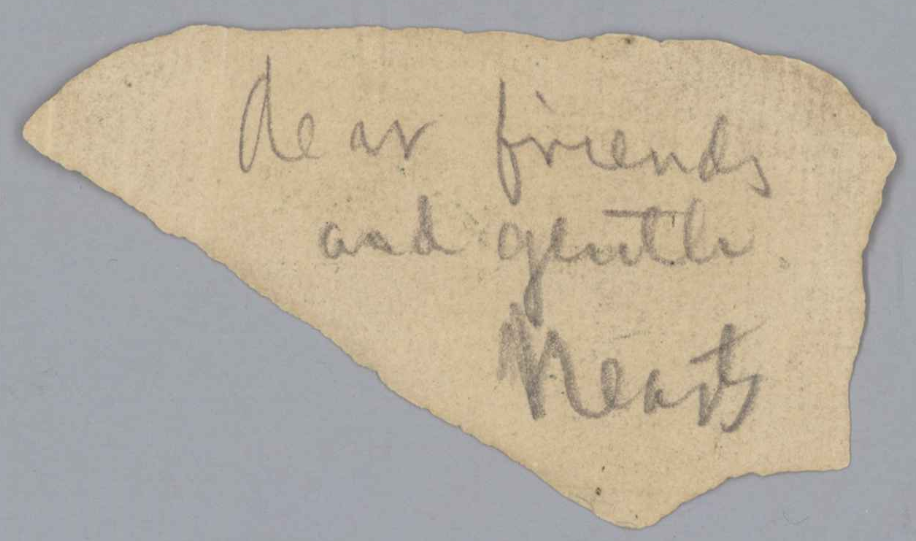
This is considered to be Stephen Foster's last message, 1863–1864, found in his wallet when he died. It bears the words "Dear friends and gentle hearts" in his handwriting. It may have been an idea for a song.

The Stephen Foster Collection and archives are the largest collection of primary source materials on the life and work of composer Stephen Foster. The collection consists of documents and other items of historical interest related to the life and work of Stephen Foster. It resides in the Stephen Foster Memorial at the University of Pittsburgh. Josiah K. Lilly donated an almost complete set of first edition music. The memorial houses sketchbooks and other memorabilia. The process of assembling the collection was methodical, well-organized and funded by various non-governmental and governmental sources. The cost of maintaining the collection is partially funded by the University of Pittsburgh.

== Purpose ==
Stephen Foster, one of the most influential composers in American history, never composed an autobiography or made any autobiographical statements. Following his death in 1864, his brother Morrison Foster, apparently ashamed by Stephen's association with abolitionists, destroyed nearly all manuscript material about him, preserving only a few dozen letters, none of which contain any biographical information, and some of his music manuscripts. Morrison also destroyed references to Stephen's life from his own letters, and published a biography of Stephen which is regarded as unreliable and nearly useless for historical purposes. 50 years after Stephen's death, historians felt a need to gather the scattered material by and about him in a single place, and thus created the Stephen Foster Collection.

== History ==
The Stephen Foster archives are housed in the Stephen Foster Memorial which was designed by architect Charles Klauder. Its construction reflects the same style as the Cathedral of Learning, and Heinz Chapel on the University of Pittsburgh's campus. The W.F. Trimble & Son's Company was contracted to help erect the building on March 2, 1935. It consists of 35,000 cubic feet (990 m^{3}) of Indiana limestone, 400 tons (360,000 kg) of steel, and 2,500 cubic yards (1,900 m^{3}) of concrete. In 1930, Josiah Kirby Lilly began collecting all forms of Foster's music, letters, furniture, original manuscripts and instruments. He kept his collection in his own stone cottage in Indianapolis. He called it Foster Hall. Then in 1932 Josiah Kirby Lilly pledged more than 10,000 Foster items to form the initial archive collection. Other efforts began the necessary fund-raising. Lily and his son covered almost half of the cost at that time amounting to $550,000. A portion of the collection has now been digitized and can be accessed through the University of Pittsburgh's University Library System.

== Methodology ==
Establishing the scope of Stephen Foster music and discography was conducted by Dr. Deane Root, the curator of the Stephen C. Foster Memorial at the University of Pittsburgh. He initiated the revision of the standard reference work on Stephen Foster music – "Songs and Compositions and Arrangements by Stephen Collins Foster 1826-1864" published in 1933. The new reference work, published with the Smithsonian Institution Press was assisted by the Rodgers and Hammerstein Archive of the New York Public Library at Lincoln Center, New York City. At the time of the drafting of the new discography, other archives were reviewed. These were Stanford University, Stanford, CA; Yale University, New Haven, CT; Library of Congress, Washington, DC; Rodgers and Hammerstein Archive, Lincoln Center, New York City; and Syracuse University, Syracuse, NY, and the Library of Congress, Music Division. Creating the new discography was aided by collectors throughout the United States and in foreign countries. These loaned their own catalogs, listed out specific records in their collections, and supplied other known listings. The examination of private, commercial auction lists and other retail mail offerings were also used to identify Foster pieces for purchase and to compare to the other listings.

In updating the 1933 discography, Root employed other materials. Slips came with the early-unmarked cylinders, and were often hand-written. These written descriptions were not attached to the cylinders themselves. This was not the case for labels pressed on a disc recordings which were badly deteriorated.

One the collections notable recordings was a brown Wax Cylinder (c.1895) from Wheeling, WV. This recording by the vocalist Edward M. Favor is one of the earliest recordings in the archives. Its volume is faint and was intended to be used with a tube and earphone type machine. Historians assume that not more than 50 pieces were made of this cylinder.

Research into creating a new, authoritative and complete discography included the review of marketing materials of the Edison Amberol record supplements were published every month from 1906 to the 1920s by the Edison Record sales staff in Orange, NJ, The purpose of the promotional materials was to keep the public and recording retailers up to date on the newest Edison releases. Edison's company wanted to appeal to as wide an audience as possible. His marketing materials were helpful in expanding the discography and identified marches by Sousa, a recitation by Davenport), violin solos by Spaulding, orchestra selections such as Herbert's Operetta Little Nemo, and a ballad by tenor Will Oakland (Just Before the Battle Mother).

Though today recording companies are generally cooperative, creating a comprehensive discography was hampered by the usual business practices of controlling costs and the lack of financial incentives in the preservation of commercial record companies. At the time that a recording was made, it was not viewed as "a creation of recorded history", and files were maintained for "commercial control". Recording companies have not been found to support research into their own history in house or by outside researchers. For example, Columbia Records, established in the 1890s has little information on the thousands of cylinder recordings it sold.

== Discography ==
The Stephen Foster archives are housed in the Stephen Foster Memorial on the campus of the University of Pittsburgh, also the location of the Center For American Music (Pittsburgh). The contents were collected by various organizations and individuals who conducted their efforts between 1896 and 1925. The collection includes the acoustic recordings made in US during these years and are cataloged in a discography. This list describes the over 450 published and 32 unpublished acoustic recordings. In addition to the recording themselves, the collection documents biographical details along with accompanying photographs of the musicians, groups, vocalists and music publishers who performed or sold Foster's music.

The recordings were transferred from original cylinders and record albums. The cylinders are of various speed, speeds and manufacture and origin. They are made of both wax and celluloid. The cylinders are recordings of songs that are from two and four minutes long (some longer). The long playing albums (70 rpm), made of shellac, of the music were also transferred to audio cassettes. Disc recordings range from five to twelve inches. Player piano rolls and music box perforated discs were also used at the time to play Foster's music, although these are not part of the collection.

Contributors to the collection include: Creegan, The Association of Recorded Sound Collections (ARSC).

== Holdings ==
The Foster Hall Collection contains many primary sources:

- his Bible
- music manuscripts
- Stephen Foster's bound sketchbook
- his bound account book
- his personal and family correspondence
- musical instruments
- business records
- photographs
- newspaper clippings
- his manuscript material
- correspondence
- personal possessions
- his autograph
- personal books owned by Foster
- sheet music
- musical instruments
- Foster's prayer book
- Eight-keyed rosewood flute
- Standard nineteenth-century six-octave square piano with rosewood case
- Three-octave instrument with oak case. Features knee bellows, detachable legs and shoulder straps for portability when serenading
- wedding gifts
- hospital documents
- Telegram informing Foster's family of his death
- images of Foster
- photos of Foster
- hand-written music manuscripts by Foster
- Foster's commercial ledger
- autographs, poems by Foster
- contracts
- the well-known scrap of paper found in Foster's wallet after his death with the words "Dear friends and gentle hearts" in his autograph.
- telegraph to Morrison Foster informing him of Stephen's death

== Biographical materials ==
The resources of the collection have been used by numerous biographers.
