= Stephen Foster's sketchbook =

Stephen Foster's Sketchbook
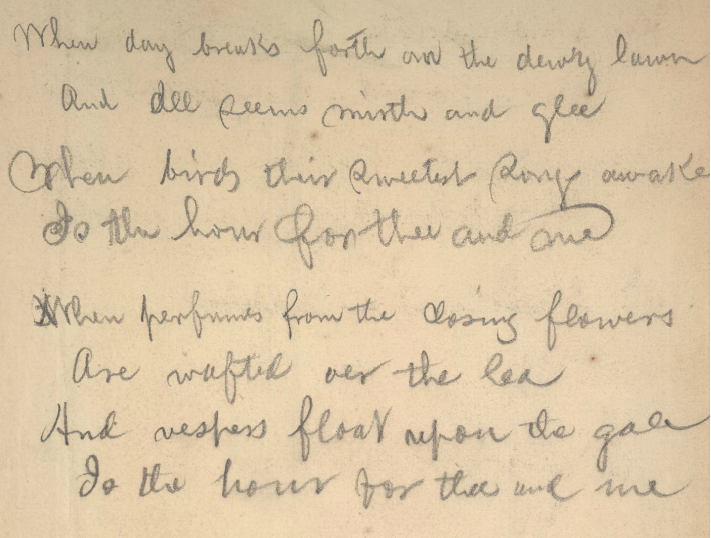
- page from Stephen Foster's sketchbook
- Created: June 26, 1851
- Location: Stephen Foster Collection, Center for American Music, Stephen Foster Memorial, University of Pittsburgh, Pittsburgh, Pennsylvania, United States of America
- Author: Stephen Collins Foster
- Purpose: Stephen Foster's working sketchbook containing his handwritten, original musical compositions, lyrics, illustrations and notes

Stephen Foster's sketchbook is the hand-written book authored by early American composer and lyricist Stephen Collins Foster. It spans a nine-year period beginning on June 26, 1851. It was donated to the University of Pittsburgh Library System by the Foster family in the early 1930s. The National History Education Clearinghouse considers it a " useful resource for those researching Foster or the history of 19th-century American music and culture."

== Description ==
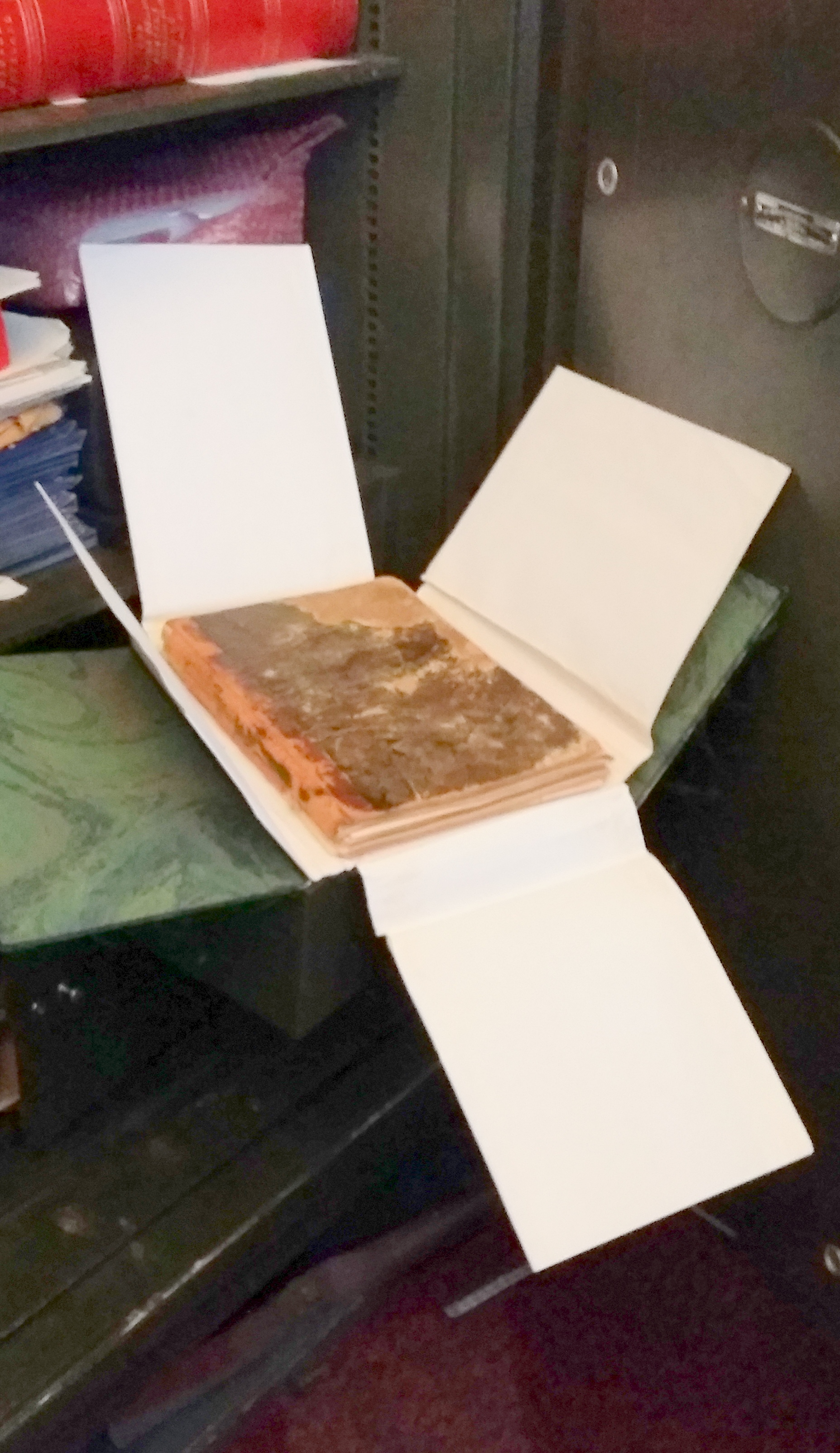
The Stephen Collins Foster sketchbook kept in a safe at the archives

The sketchbook measures 12 by 8 inches (30 by 20 centimetres) and contains 113 leaves of half-bound paper. The papers are of the same material and contained in a cover of thick paper boards, covered in red and blue marbleized paper and brown leather. Eight pages are missing. One page had been cut out by the composer's granddaughter but was restored to its original place in the sketchbook. The entries are consistent, similar and handwritten with pencil. The book is inscribed “Allegheny City June 26, 1851” in Foster's hand on page 1.

== Contents ==
The sketchbook contains handwritten draft texts for sixty-four different songs. Some of these were some of his most popular. Some pages contain musical notations, draft lyrics are for unpublished songs, scribbles, doodles, and exercises. In some places it appears that Foster practiced his signature and initials.

In addition to the digital version, a photostat of the sketchbook was published by the staff of the Foster Hall Collection in 1933. This full transcript of the book was created by Deane L. Root and edited by Kathryn Miller Haines in June 2000. The Transcript field within the database contains the text and is searchable. Foliation (recto and verso) numbers were supplied in 1986 using archival techniques.

The draft and original text for Foster's song "Jeanie with the Light Brown Hair" is contained in the sketchbook. In addition, Foster records his meeting with Charles Dickens while Dickens was visiting in Pittsburgh.

== Digitizing the Sketchbook ==
Dr. Julia Craig-McFeeley of the Digital Image Archive of Medieval Manuscripts in Oxford, England created the digitized version of the sketchbook in March 2005. The digitizing was performed by a PhaseOne PowerPhase FX digital scanning back mounted on a Fuji GX 680 III professional SLR camera body and medium format lens at a resolution of 800dpi.

Stephen Foster's sketchbook was used as a display and exhibition for recent visits from library archivists.

== Significance ==
This is one of only a few pieces autobiographical, besides a few short letters to his family. Morrison Foster destroyed most other written documents having to do with the life of the composer. The Center For American music describes the sketchbook as "The most significant item in this subseries is Foster's manuscript or sketchbook ..."

The Public Broadcasting organization describes the sketchbook: "Stephen spent much of his life in Pittsburgh where he worked consistently at his songwriting, keeping a thick sketchbook to draft ideas for song lyrics and melodies. As a professional songwriter of unparalleled skill and technique – not an untutored musical genius – he had made it his business to study the various music and poetic styles circulating in the immigrant populations of the new United States. His intention was to write the people's music, using images and a musical vocabulary that would be widely understood by all groups. Foster worked very hard at writing, sometimes taking several months to craft and polish the words, melody, and accompaniment of a song before sending it off to a publisher. His sketchbook shows that he often labored over the smallest details, the right prepositions, even where to include or remove a comma from his lyrics."
