= Charles Klauder =

American architect (1872–1938)

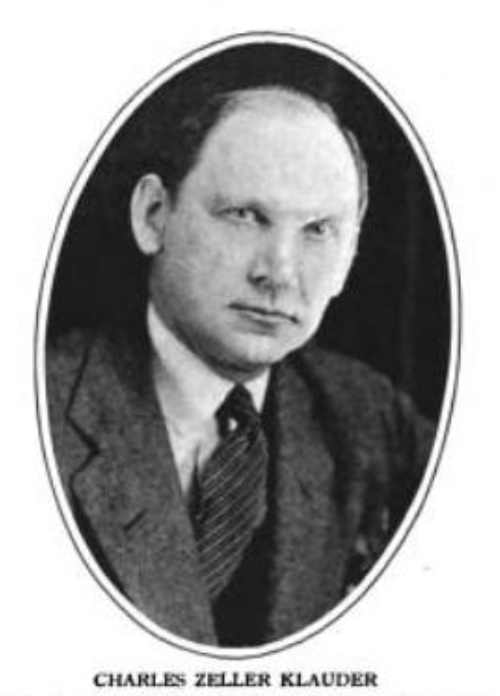
- Born: Charles Zeller Klauder; February 9, 1872; Philadelphia, Pennsylvania, U.S.
- Died: October 30, 1938 (aged 66); Philadelphia, Pennsylvania, U.S.
- Burial place: West Laurel Hill Cemetery, Bala Cynwyd, Pennsylvania, U.S.
- Education: Pennsylvania Museum and School of Industrial Art
- Occupation: Architect
- Practice: T. P. Chandler; Wilson Brothers & Company; Cope and Stewardson; Horace Trumbauer; Day & Brother; Day and Klauder; Charles Z. Klauder
- Buildings: Cathedral of Learning; Franklin Field; Heinz Memorial Chapel; Old Main (Pennsylvania State University); Palestra; Peabody Museum of Natural History; Rec Hall; Stephen Foster Memorial

Charles Zeller Klauder (February 9, 1872 – October 30, 1938) was an American architect. He partnered with Frank Miles Day in 1911 to create the firm Day & Klauder and continued to operate it under his own name after Day's death in 1918.

He is credited with the development of the Collegiate Gothic architectural style. He created the campus designs for several educational institutions and built numerous buildings on university campuses in both the English Gothic architecture and Georgian architecture style.

He was the supervising architect at New York University. From 1918 to 1938, Klauder designed 15 buildings on the University of Colorado Boulder campus in what has been described as Tuscan Vernacular Revival architectural style. His most famous building, the Cathedral of Learning at the University of Pittsburgh, is considered the first college campus "skyscraper".

== Early life and education ==
Klauder was born February 9, 1872, in Philadelphia, Pennsylvania, to Louis and Anna Koehler Klauder. While studying architecture at the Pennsylvania Museum and School of Industrial Art, he worked at the offices of T. P. Chandler.

He received an honorary Master of Fine Arts degree from Princeton University in 1921.

== Career ==
He worked with T. P. Chandler through 1893, and then worked for several prominent Philadelphia architectural firms, including Wilson Brothers & Company, Cope and Stewardson, and Horace Trumbauer. In 1900, Klauder became chief draftsman for Frank Miles Day & Brother, which led to a 1911 partnership, and the firm's eventual renaming as Day & Klauder. Klauder continued the firm after Day's 1918 death. In 1927, he renamed the business under his own name, Charles Z. Klauder.

His firm had a national presence and is credited with the creation of the Collegiate Gothic architecture style. He created campus designs for several educational institutions including Concordia Seminary in St Louis, Missouri, Pennsylvania State University, St. Paul's School in Concord, New Hampshire, and the University of Colorado in Boulder, Colorado. He was the supervising architect at New York University.

He designed buildings at Albion College, Brown University, Cornell University, Drew University, Franklin & Marshall College, Johns Hopkins University, Mercersburg Academy, Pennsylvania State University, Princeton University, Rhode Island School of Design, Thiel College, University of Chicago, University of Delaware, University of Denver, University of Pennsylvania, University of Pittsburgh, Vanderbilt University, Wellesley College, and Yale University. Many of the buildings were designed in the English Gothic architecture and Georgian architecture style. Between 1918 and 1938, Klauder designed 15 buildings on the University of Colorado Boulder campus in what has been described as Tuscan Vernacular Revival architectural style.

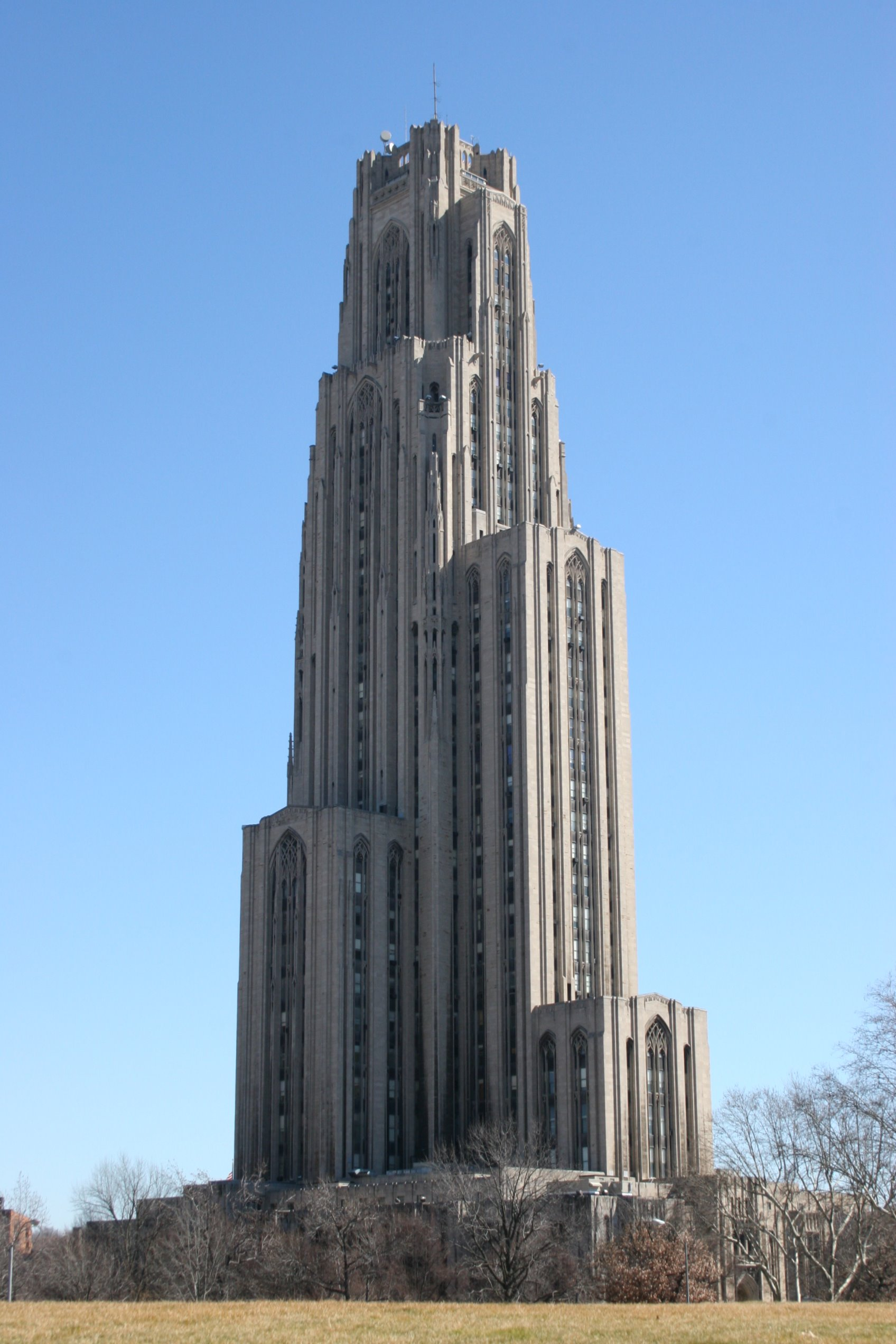
The Cathedral of Learning at the University of Pittsburgh is the first "skyscraper" on a college campus

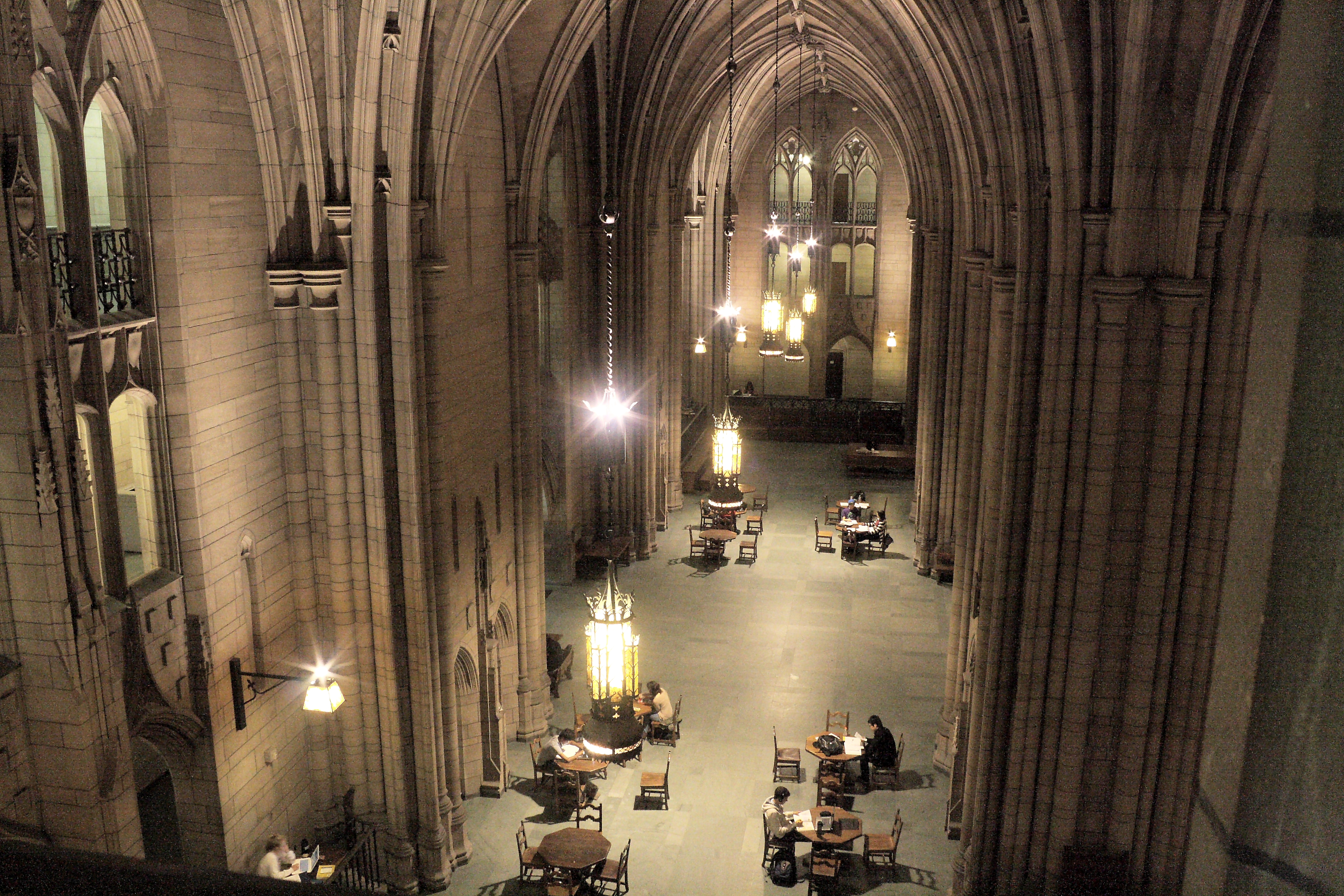
The Commons Room in the Cathedral of Learning

His most famous building, the Cathedral of Learning at the University of Pittsburgh, is considered the first college campus "skyscraper". The Commons Room inside the cathedral is a fifteenth-century English perpendicular Gothic-style hall that covers half an acre (2,000 m^{2}) and extends upwards four stories, reaching 52 feet (16 m) tall.

He became a member of the T-Square Club in 1891 and later served as president. He was a member of the AIA and attained the status of fellow in 1915. He served as president of the Philadelphia Chapter of the AIA. He was elected a Corresponding Member of Central Association of Austrian Architects of Vienna in 1926. He was an associate of the National Academy of Design and a member of the Boston Architectural Club.

He received the Silver Medal of the T-Square Club in 1891; the Medal of the Pennsylvania Chapter of the AIA in 1918; the Gold Medal of the Architectural League of New York in 1921; the Gold Medal of the AIA in 1921; the Grand Prix and Silver Medal of the Pan American Congress of Architects in 1927; and the Medal in Architecture at the 1928 Olympics.

Klauder died October 30, 1938, in Philadelphia. He was interred at West Laurel Hill Cemetery in Bala Cynwyd, Pennsylvania.

== Personal life ==
He married Frederika M. Bower in 1901 and together they had two children.

== Select Works ==
- Walker Dormitories, Princeton University, 1903
- Baker Laboratory, Cornell University, 1916-1919
- Jesse Metcalf Memorial Laboratory of Chemistry, Brown University, 1920-1930
- Franklin Field, University of Pennsylvania, 1922 and 1925
- Cathedral of Learning, University of Pittsburgh, 1923-1942
- Biesecker Gymnasium, Franklin & Marshall College, 1924
- Dormitories: Dietz, Santee, Franklin, Meyran, Franklin & Marshall College, 1924-1928
- Peabody Museum of Natural History, Yale University, 1925
- Hensel Auditorium, Franklin & Marshall College, 1925-1926
- Boy Scouts of America Building, 1926
- Concordia Seminary, 1926
- Palestra, University of Pennsylvania, 1926-1928
- Main Hall, Mercersburg Academy, 1927
- Rec Hall, Pennsylvania State University, 1928
- Frick Hall, Princeton University, 1929
- Old Main, Pennsylvania State University, 1930
- Heinz Memorial Chapel, University of Pittsburgh, 1933-1938
- Stephen Foster Memorial, University of Pittsburgh, 1937

== Gallery ==
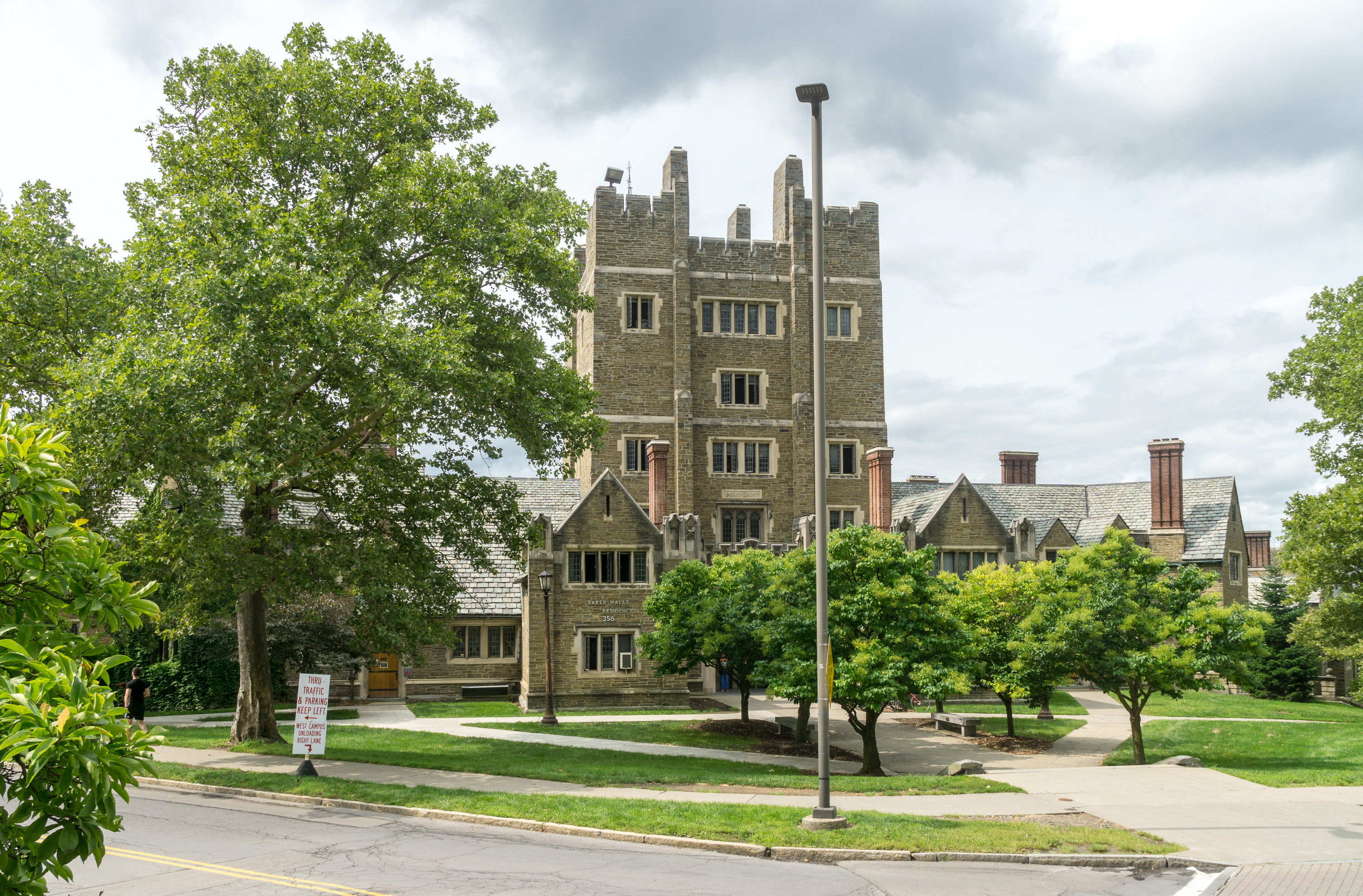
Baker Hall and Tower, Cornell University, 1913

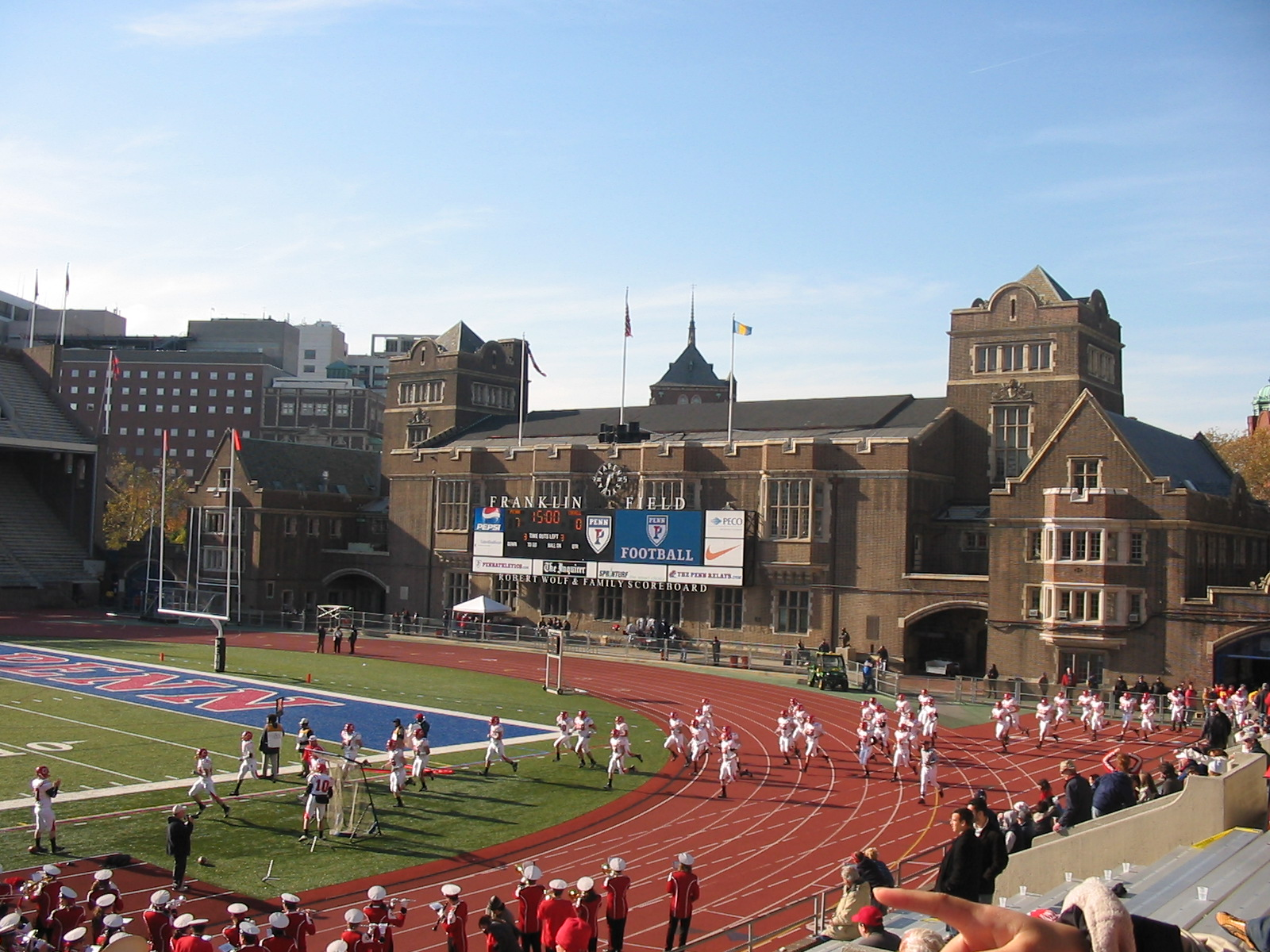
Franklin Field, University of Pennsylvania, 1922

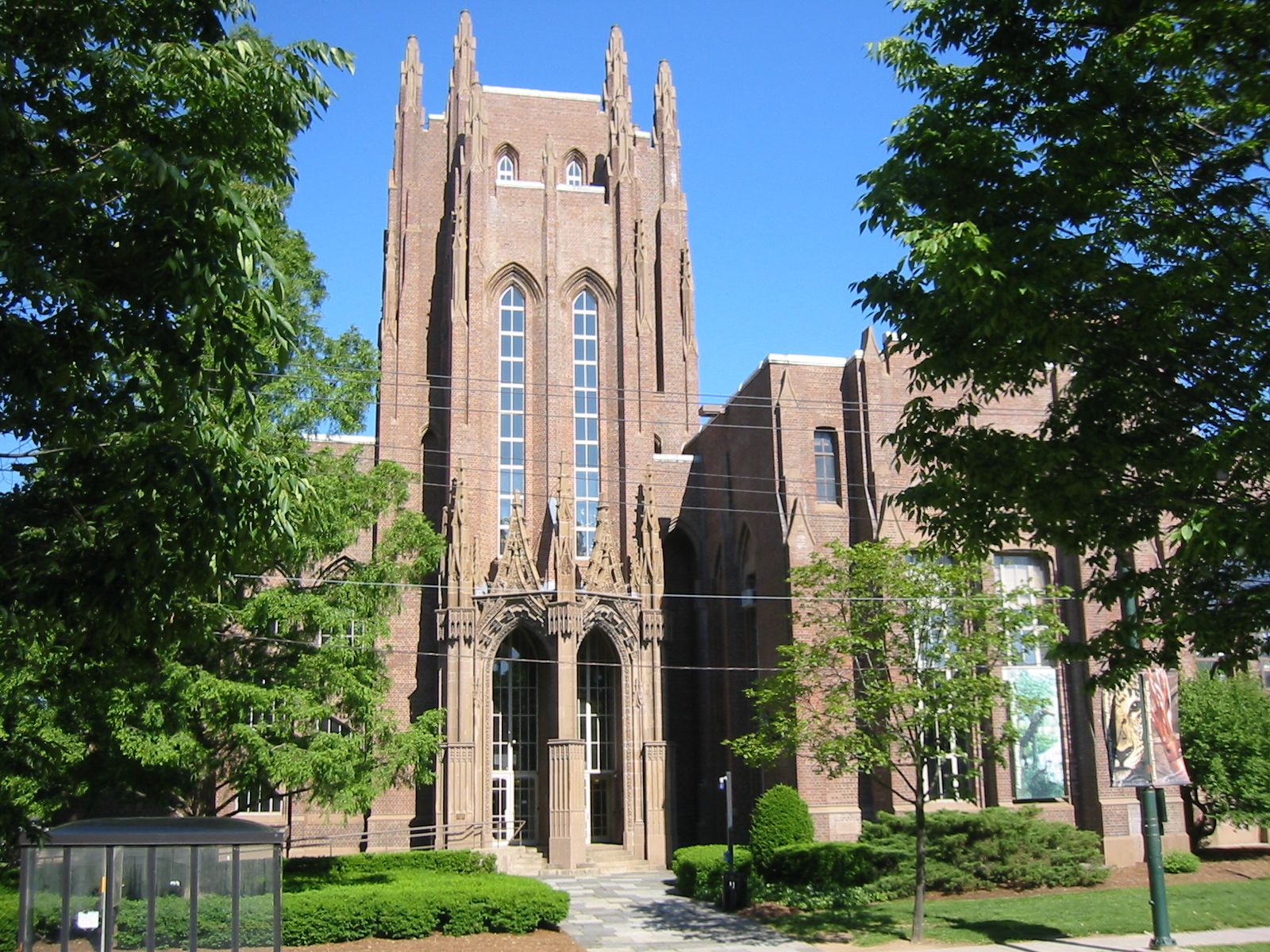
Peabody Museum of Natural History, Yale University, 1925

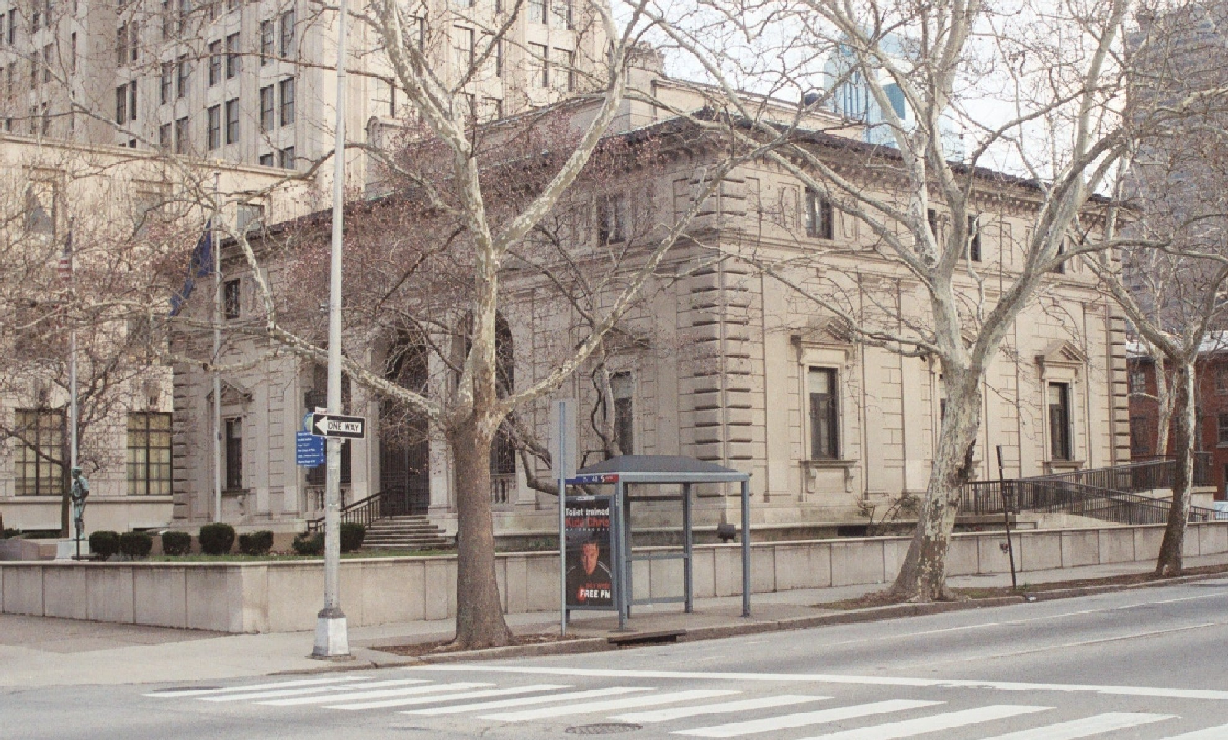
Boy Scouts of America Building, 1926

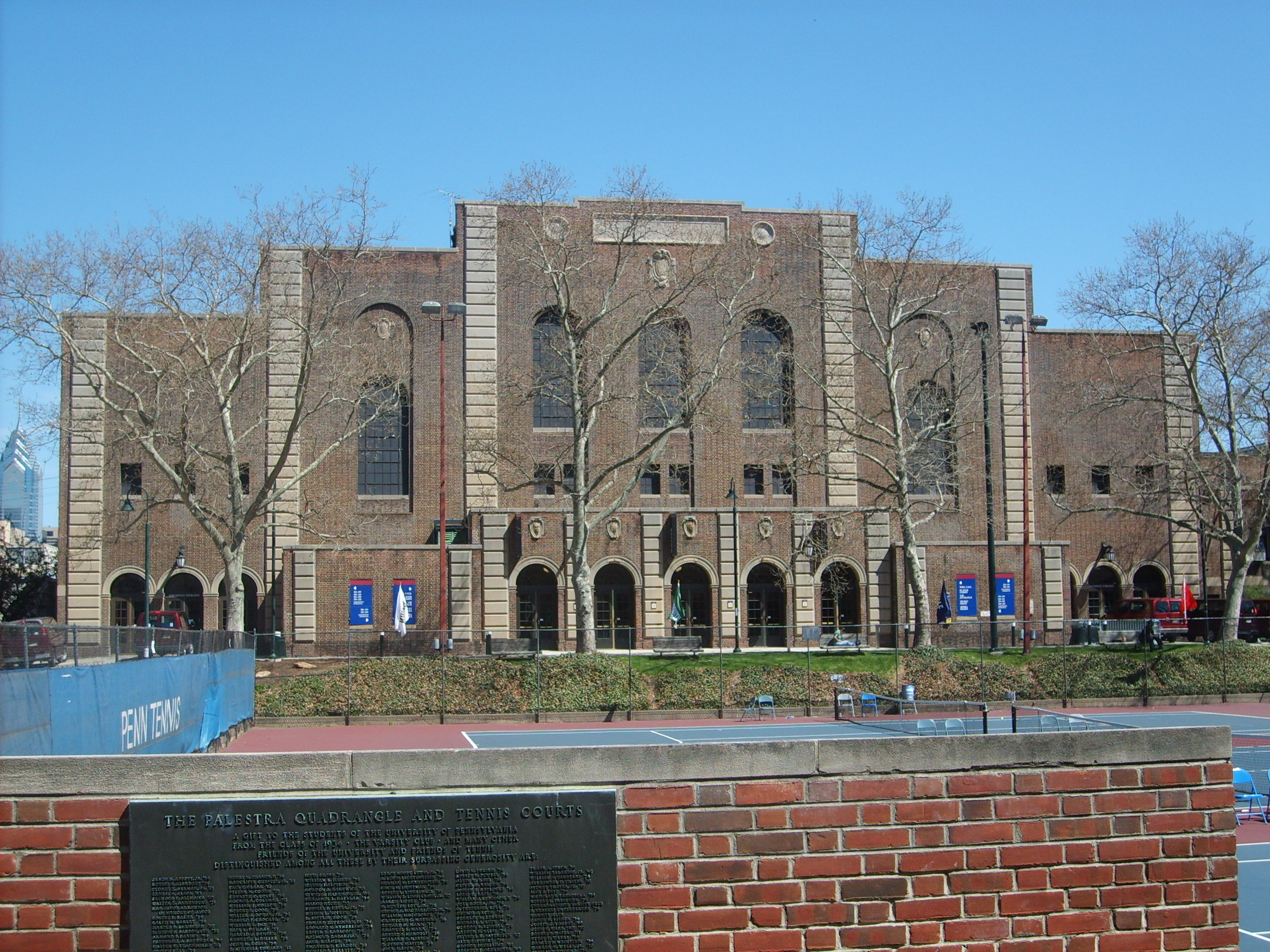
The Palestra, University of Pennsylvania, 1926

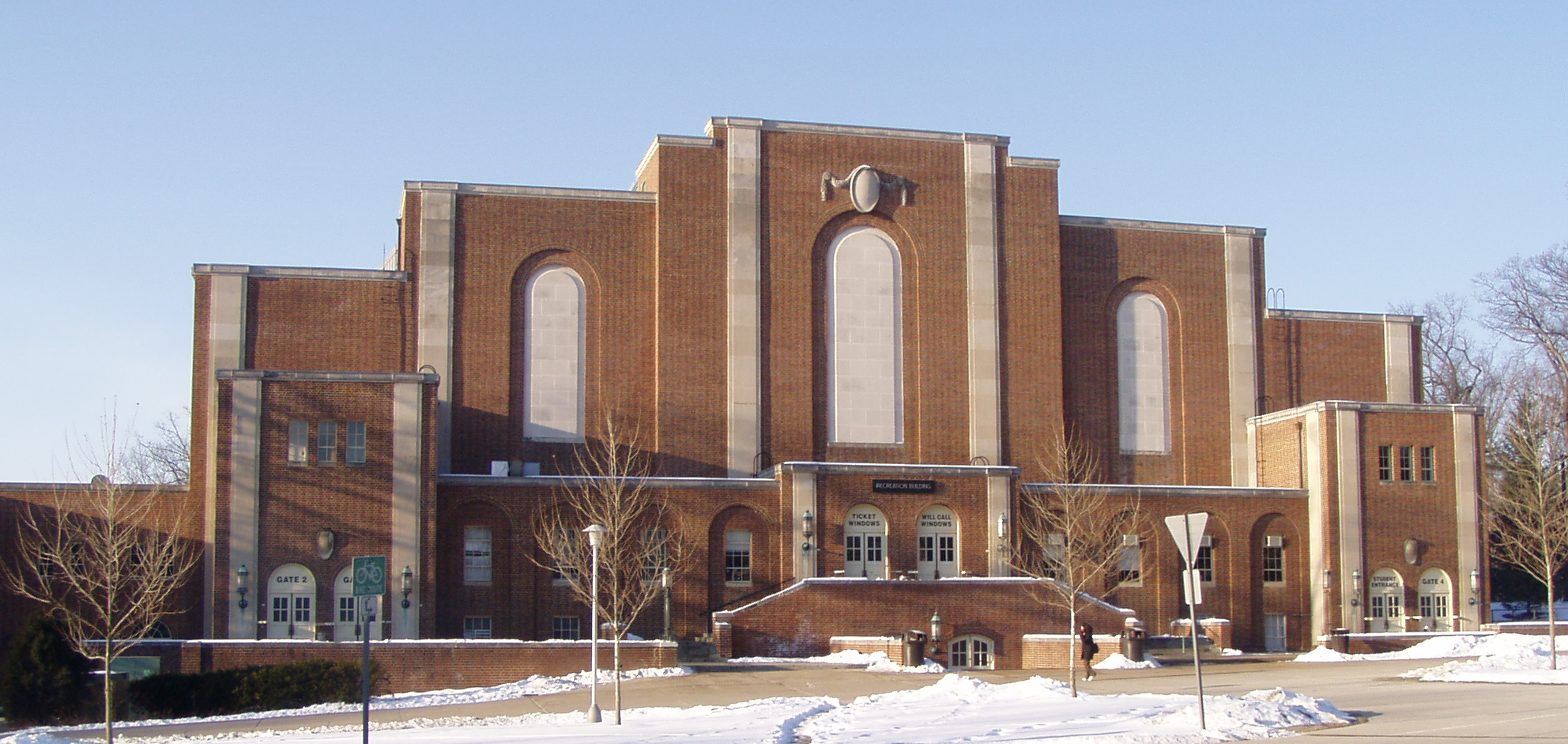
Rec Hall, Pennsylvania State University, 1927

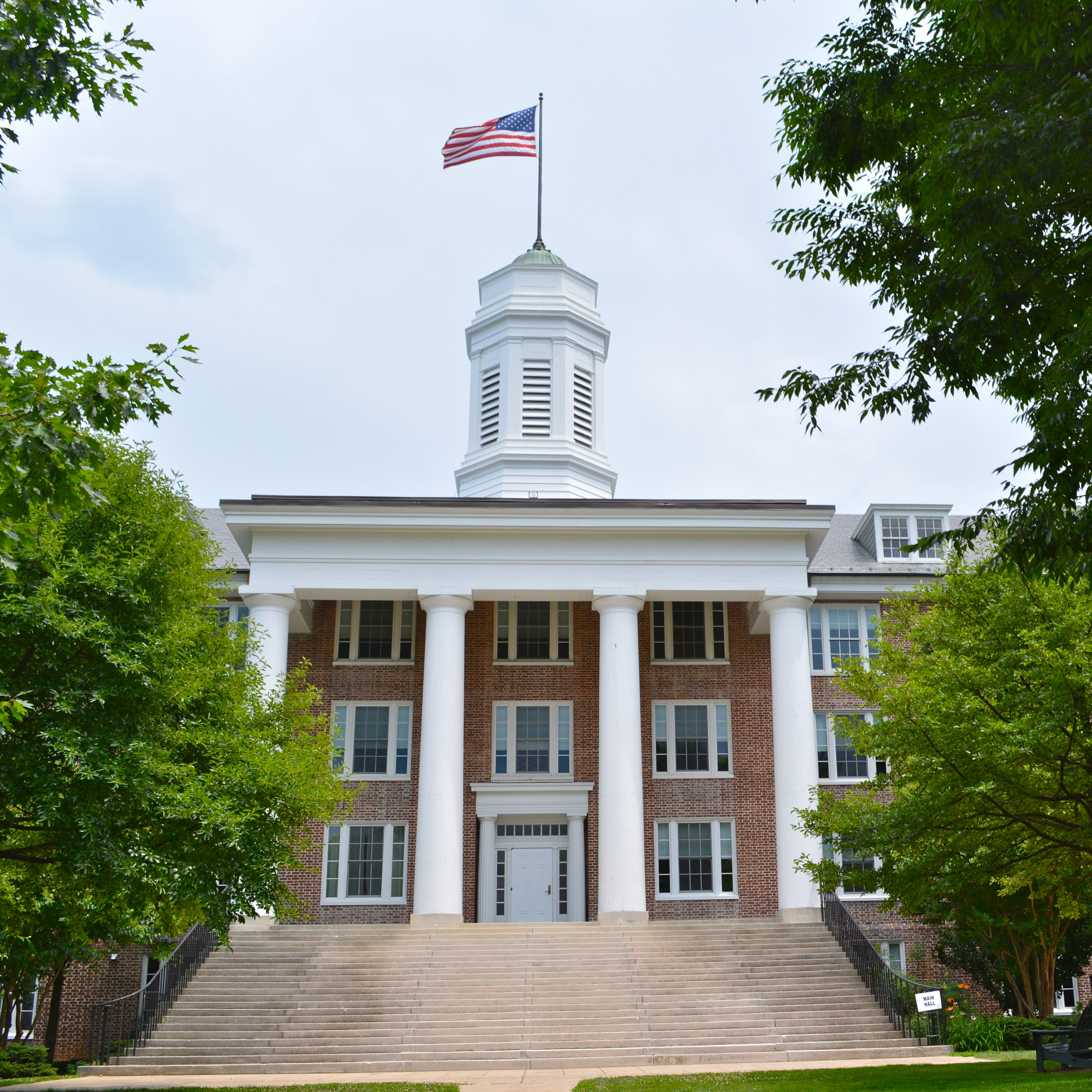
Main Hall, Mercersburg Academy, 1927

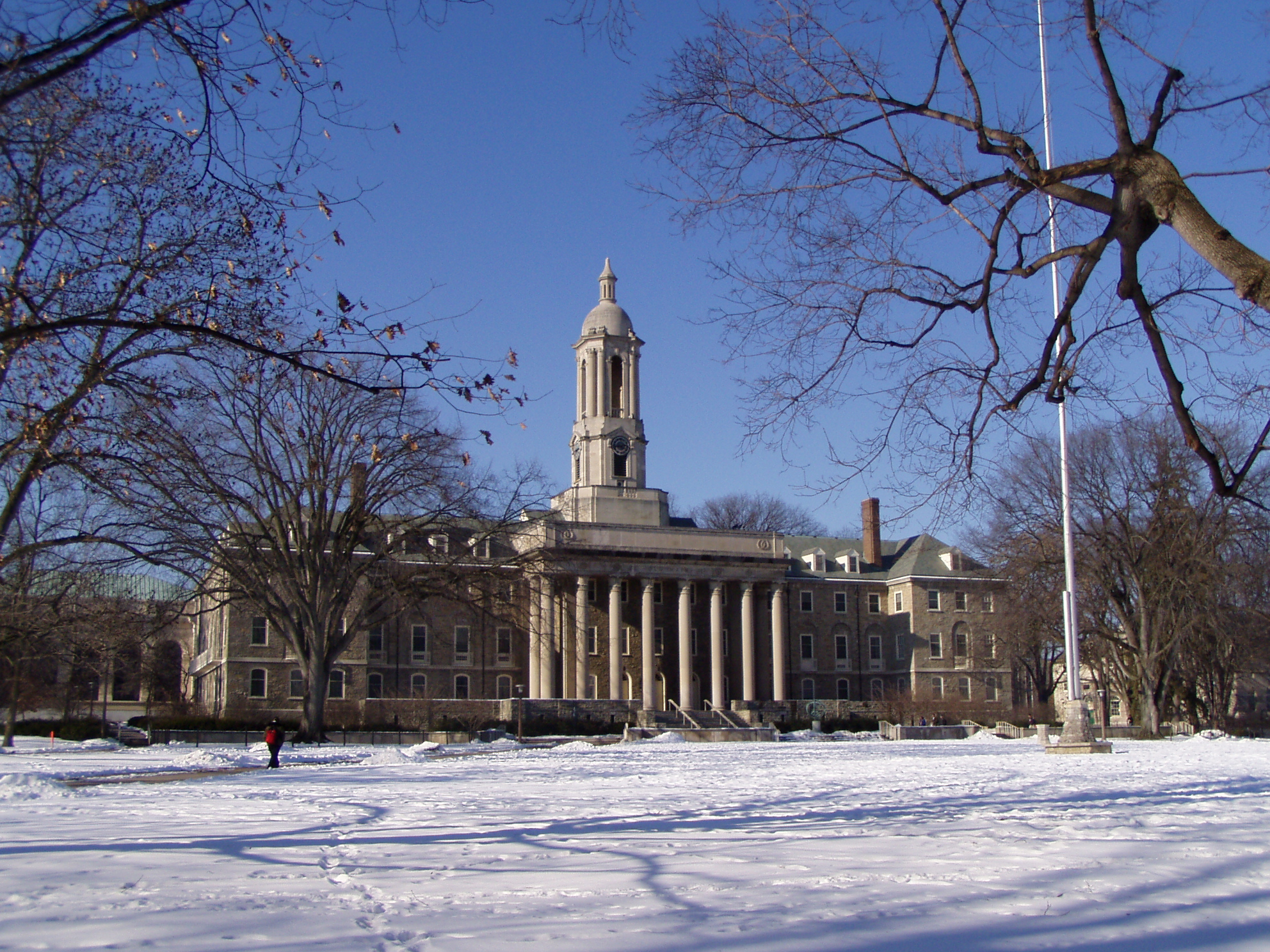
Old Main, Pennsylvania State University, 1930

Heinz Memorial Chapel, University of Pittsburgh, 1933

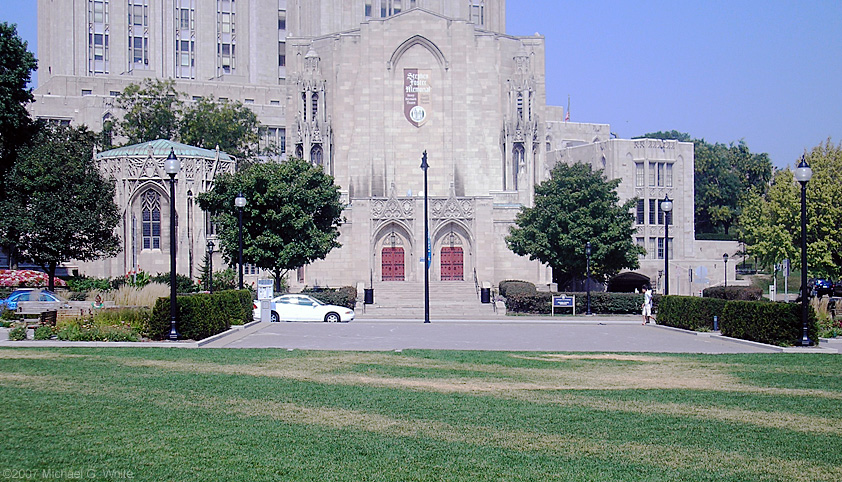
Stephen Foster Memorial, University of Pittsburgh, 1937

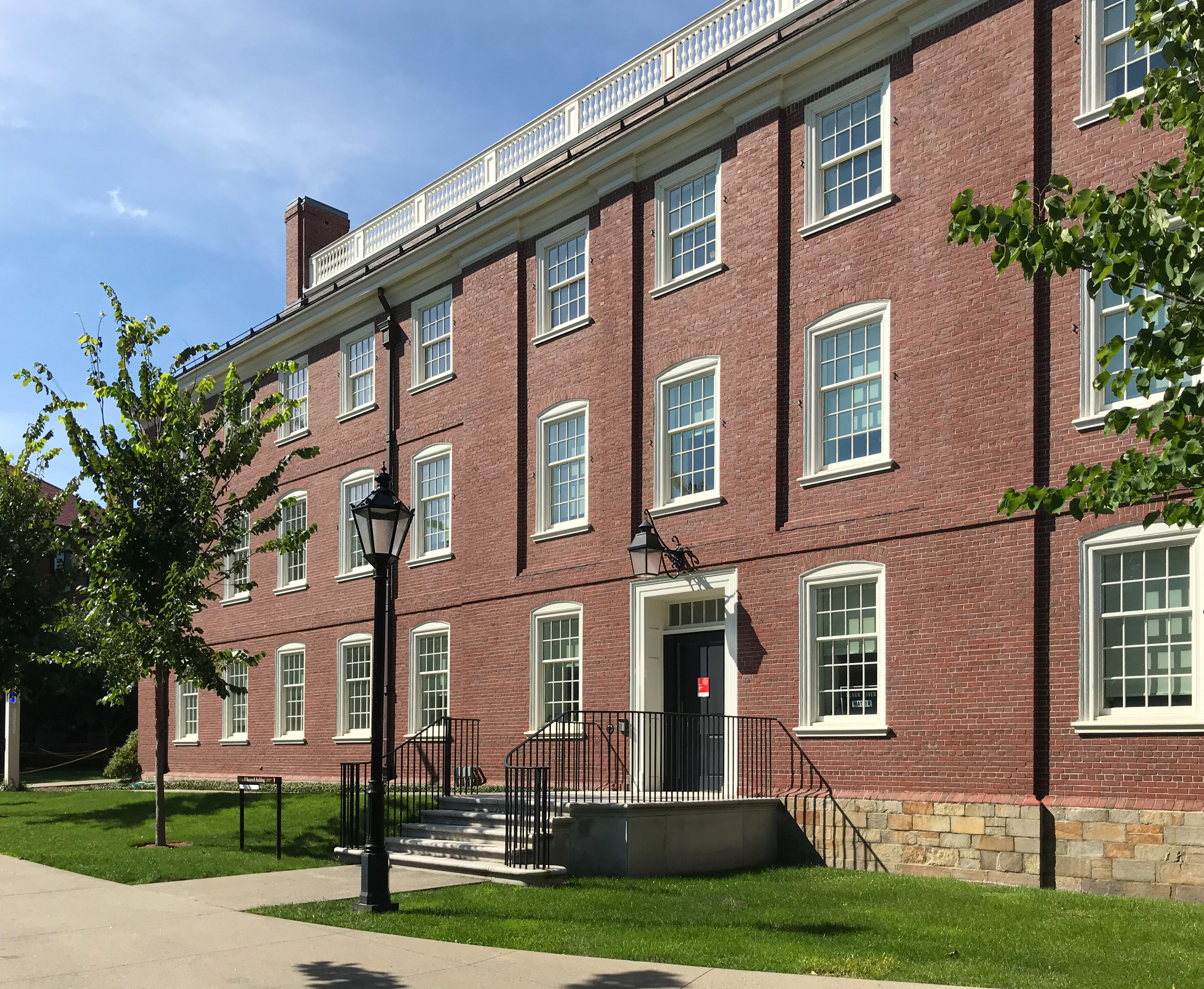
Metcalf Research Laboratory, Brown University, 1938

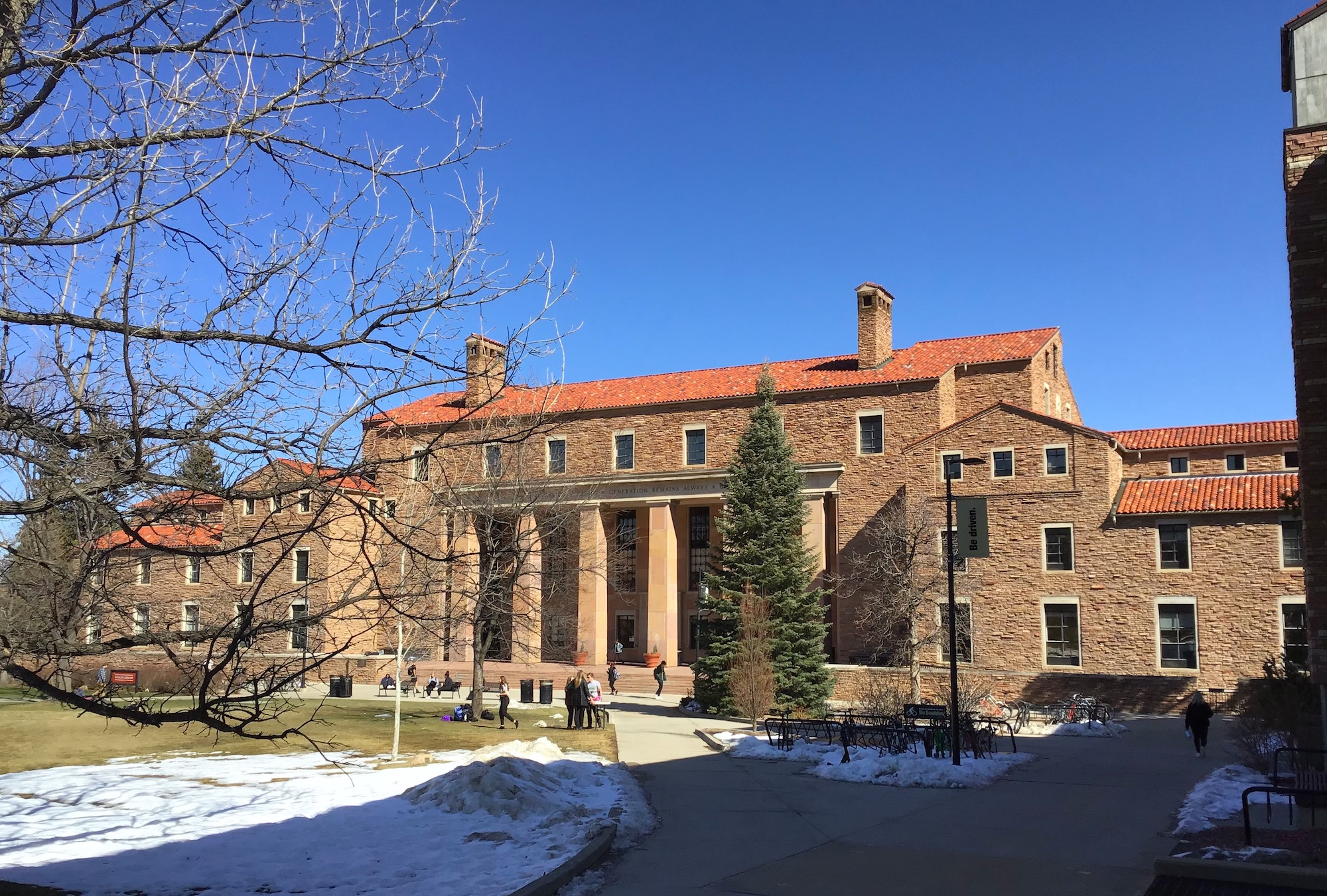
Norlin Library, University of Colorado Boulder, 1939

== Publications ==
- Klauder, Charles Z.; Wise, Herbert C. (1929). College Architecture in America. New York: Charles Scribner's Sons. ASIN B002R1JZJ2.

== Additional reading ==
- Alberts, Robert C. (1987). Pitt: The Story of the University of Pittsburgh 1787-1987. University of Pittsburgh Press. ISBN 9780822962359.
