= Stephen Foster Memorial =

- Stephen Collins Foster Memorial
- U.S. Historic district – Contributing property
- Pennsylvania state historical marker
- Pittsburgh Landmark – PHLF
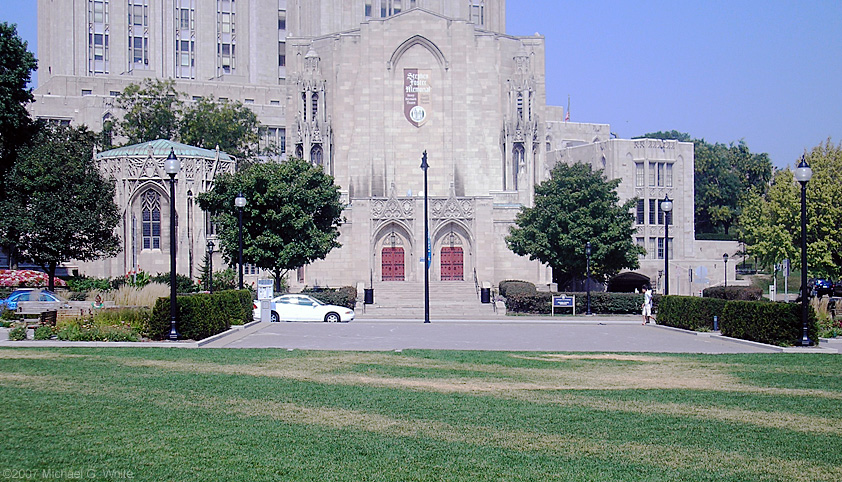
- Stephen Foster Memorial at the University of Pittsburgh
- Location: Pittsburgh, Pennsylvania, USA
- Coordinates: 40°26′38″N 79°57′10″W
- Built: 1935–1937
- Architect: Charles Klauder
- Architectural style: Gothic Revival
- Part of: Schenley Farms Historic District (ID83002213)

Significant dates
- Added to NRHP: July 22, 1983
- Designated PHMC: December 1, 1958
- Designated PHLF: 1973

The Stephen Collins Foster Memorial is a performing arts center and museum which houses the Stephen Foster Archives at the University of Pittsburgh in Pittsburgh, Pennsylvania, USA. It is dedicated to the life and works of American songwriter Stephen Foster.

It is a contributing property to the Schenley Farms National Historic District, is designated as a Pittsburgh History and Landmarks Foundation Historical Landmark, and is a landmark whose significance is designated by a Pennsylvania Historical and Museum Commission Historical Marker. It is located along Forbes Avenue in the Oakland neighborhood on the campus of the University of Pittsburgh, often referred to as Pitt.

The main structure houses the two theaters that serve as performance spaces for the university's Department of Theatre Arts: the 478-seat Charity Randall Theatre and 151-seat Henry Heymann Theatre. The left wing of the building houses the Stephen Foster Memorial Museum and the Center for American Music which contains the University of Pittsburgh's Stephen Foster Collection and archive that includes manuscripts, copies of over 200 of his musical compositions, examples of recordings, songsters, broadside, programs, books, various memorabilia, and several musical instruments, including one of Foster's pianos. The memorial is also home to the university's Ethelbert Nevin Collection and the Society for American Music.

== Building ==
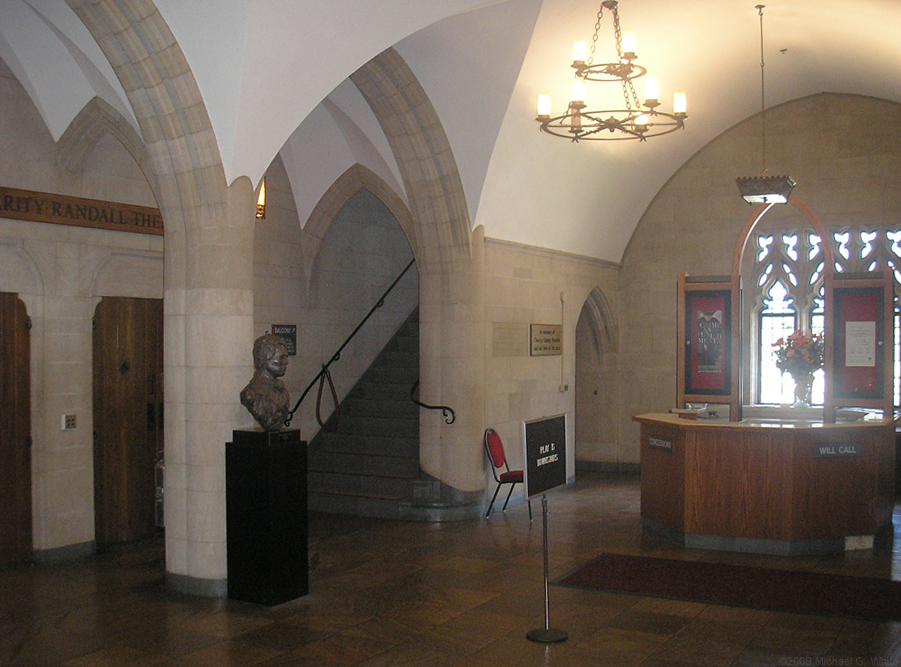
Fred Kelly Lobby

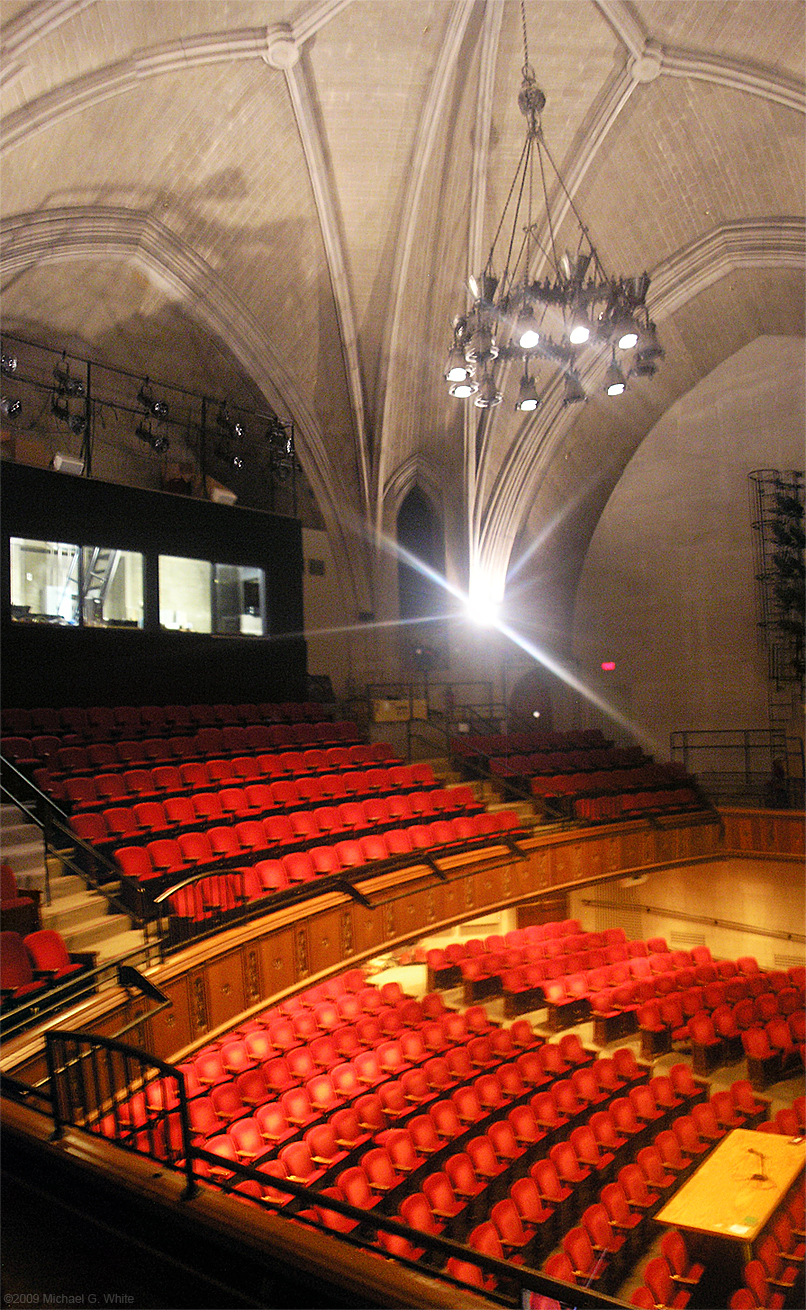
Charity Randall Theatre

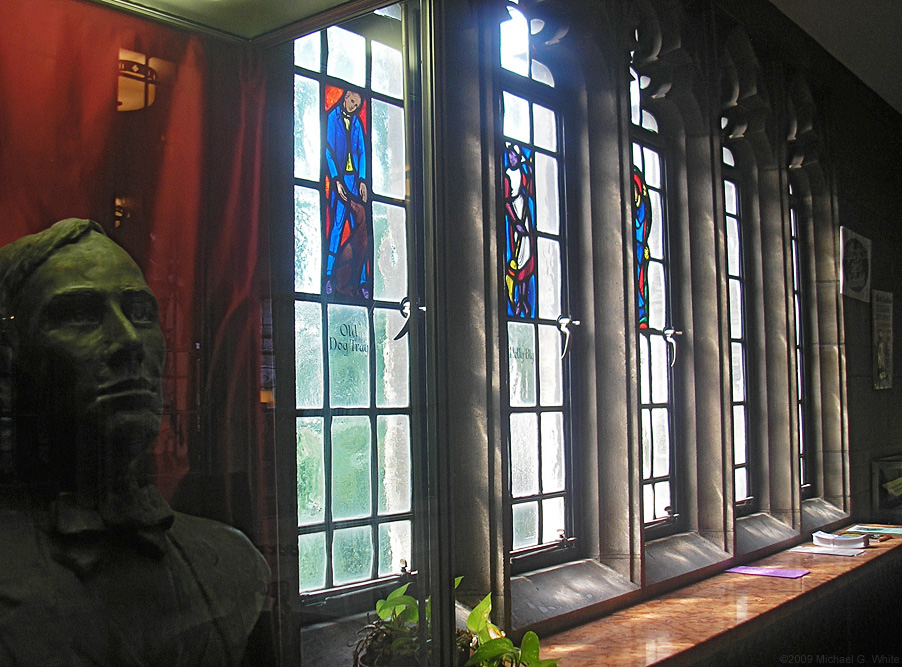
Foster shrine entrance hallway and Charles Connick stained glass

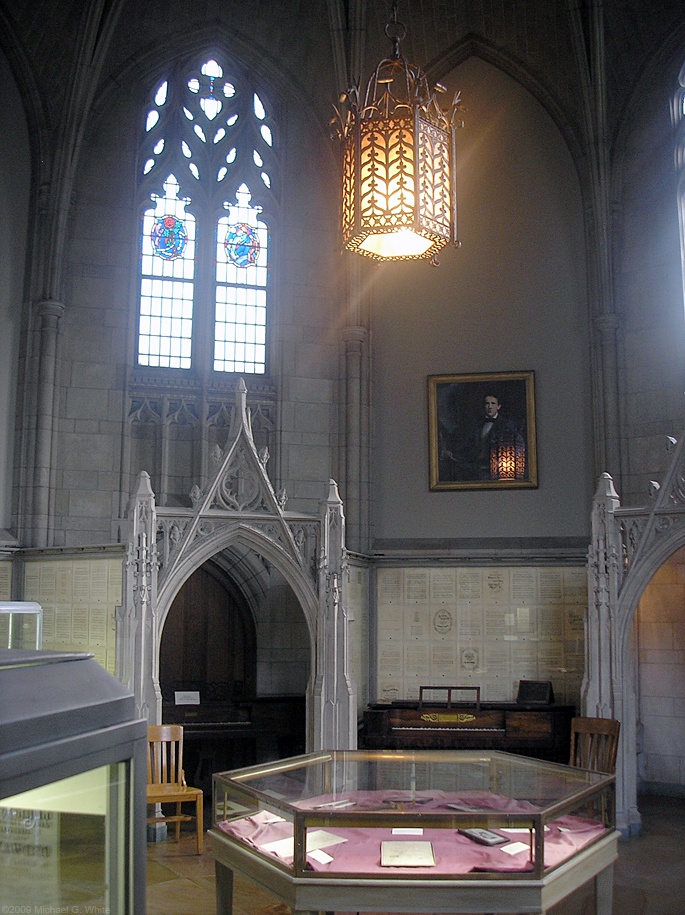
Interior of the Stephen Foster Shrine

The Stephen Foster Memorial, dedicated in 1937, is a steel-framed structure faced with the same Indiana Limestone used for the university's Cathedral of Learning. It is one of two buildings, the other being Heinz Memorial Chapel, designed by its architect, Charles Klauder, to accompany his centerpiece Cathedral of Learning on the gothic revival portion of the university's campus. The W.F. Trimble & Son's Company was contracted to help erect the building on March 2, 1935. It was constructed using 35,000 cubic feet (990 m^{3}) of Indiana limestone, 400 tons (360,000 kg) of steel, and 2,500 cubic yards (1,900 m^{3}) of concrete. In 2003, a $3.2 million renovation of the Stephen Foster Memorial, focusing on its theater facilities, was completed by Colker and Tom Wiley of Pittsburgh's WTW Architects.

The stone courtyard that is adjacent to the rear of the memorial, and sits between it and the south entrance to the Cathedral of Learning, is dedicated to memorial benefactor Josiah Kirby Lilly and is named in his honor. On the grounds of the memorial, near the Foster Shrine pavilion, sits a sundial on a stone base, currently missing its gnomon, that was dedicated May 1914 to the Pittsburgh Blues of the War of 1812 by the Dolly Madison Chapter, U.S. Daughters of 1812. The sun dial was rededicated there on May 9, 1941.

The memorial building houses two theaters and, connected via a hallway, a memorial shrine dedicated to displaying items from the university's Foster Hall Collection. The Stephen Foster Memorial serves as the home for the Society for American Music and the University of Pittsburgh's Center for American's Music which encompasses a research library, archive and museum dedicated to expanding and documenting knowledge of American music and its role in American life.

=== Fred Kelly Lobby ===
The Fred Kelly Lobby, which serves as the lobby/foyer of the Charity Randall Theatre, is entered through the memorial's main Forbes Avenue-facing double red doors and contains two rectangular chandeliers by master metalworker Samuel Yellin of Philadelphia. The lobby also contains Charles Connick stained glass windows depicting Shakespeare (misspelled "Shakespere") and Beethoven that are dedicated to memorial benefactor Josiah Kirby Lilly. The 2003 renovation of the memorial added new pieces of furniture to the lobby/foyer which including an octagonal upholstered banquette, a ticket and concession stand, as well as a new wrought iron ring wheel chandelier. These three additions were designed by Pittsburgh architect Michael Chirigos whose work was inspired by the memorial's Gothic arches. The banquette's seats enclose arched cabinets showcasing playbills for future productions along with college and career memorabilia associated with Gene Kelly's youngest brother, Fred. Both Kellys were Pitt graduates, and it was Fred who taught Gene and many others to dance. The display's cost was underwritten by Fred Kelly's family as an honor to his achievements as an influential choreographer who later became a pioneering television producer and director. The lobby also commemorates outstanding Pitt Theater alumni who are recipients of Department of Theatre Art's annual Fred Kelly Award.

=== Charity Randall Theatre ===
The main 478-seat traditional proscenium theater, formerly known as the Foster Memorial Theatre, was renamed as the Charity Randall Theatre following a $2 million renovation in 2003. The theater was reconditioned to bring it up to code, update its equipment, and replicate the original conditions of the auditorium's features. These renovations were undertaken with donations from the Charity Randall Foundation which was established in 1977 to remember the sister of Pitt graduate and businessman Robert Randall and to support her interest in the arts after her death in a car accident. The plush, deep red seats, identical to those first installed New York's Radio City Music Hall, were reupholstered and their wrought iron frames and oak arms refinished to their original 1930s condition. The number of seats were reduced from 572 to 478, including the addition of 24 new freestanding balcony seats. Other auditorium improvements include new carpeting and new lighting that highlights the vaulted stone ceiling, as well as a restoration of the original Samuel Yellin designed chandelier. In addition, state-of-the-art sound, lighting, and production equipment was added, as well as a new rigging system, actors' restroom, and various stage improvements.

=== Henry Heymann Theatre ===
The downstairs of the memorial houses the 153-seat Henry Heymann Theatre, featuring a thrust stage with seating on three sides. The theater honors the university's longtime scenic designer, and theater donor, Henry Heymann, who taught scenic design from 1968 until he retired in 1993. The Heymann Theatre was created in 2000 in a space that formerly served as the memorial's social room, which hosted USO dances during World War II. A little-known tunnel also extends from the Heymann Theatre to under the loading dock level of the Cathedral of Learning, connecting the two buildings. During the 2003 renovations to the memorial, the downstairs dressing room area was reconfigured to accommodate three "star" dressing rooms and men's and women's showers. Another basement room serves as headquarters for the still-active Tuesday Musical Club, which initiated the original idea and drive for the construction of the Stephen Foster Memorial.

=== Foster Shrine ===
The left wing, composed of the pavilion of the Foster Shrine, is entered from the left of the building's foyer, which serves as the lobby of the Charity Randall Theatre, and through an entrance corridor that features Foster artifacts, a Foster bust, and five small casement windows featuring Connick stained glass windows devoted to symbols of Stephen Foster and his songs. Moving along the corridor to the shrine, on the right is the entrance to the Foster Reading Room and library, which is home to much of the Foster collection, including its more fragile contents, that can be examined by appointment. Continuing on, the corridor opens into a 12-sided gothic chamber with lancet windows containing Connick stained glass medallions which illustrate various Foster songs. On display in the Shrine in and around Gothic-arched alcoves are Foster's piano, sheet music, broadsides, recordings, and other personal items and memorabilia. The 2003 renovation left the memorial shrine untouched, except for the addition of an unobtrusive fire suppression systems.

== History ==
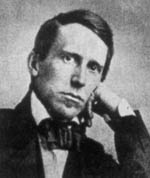
Stephen Foster (1826–1864), the center's namesake

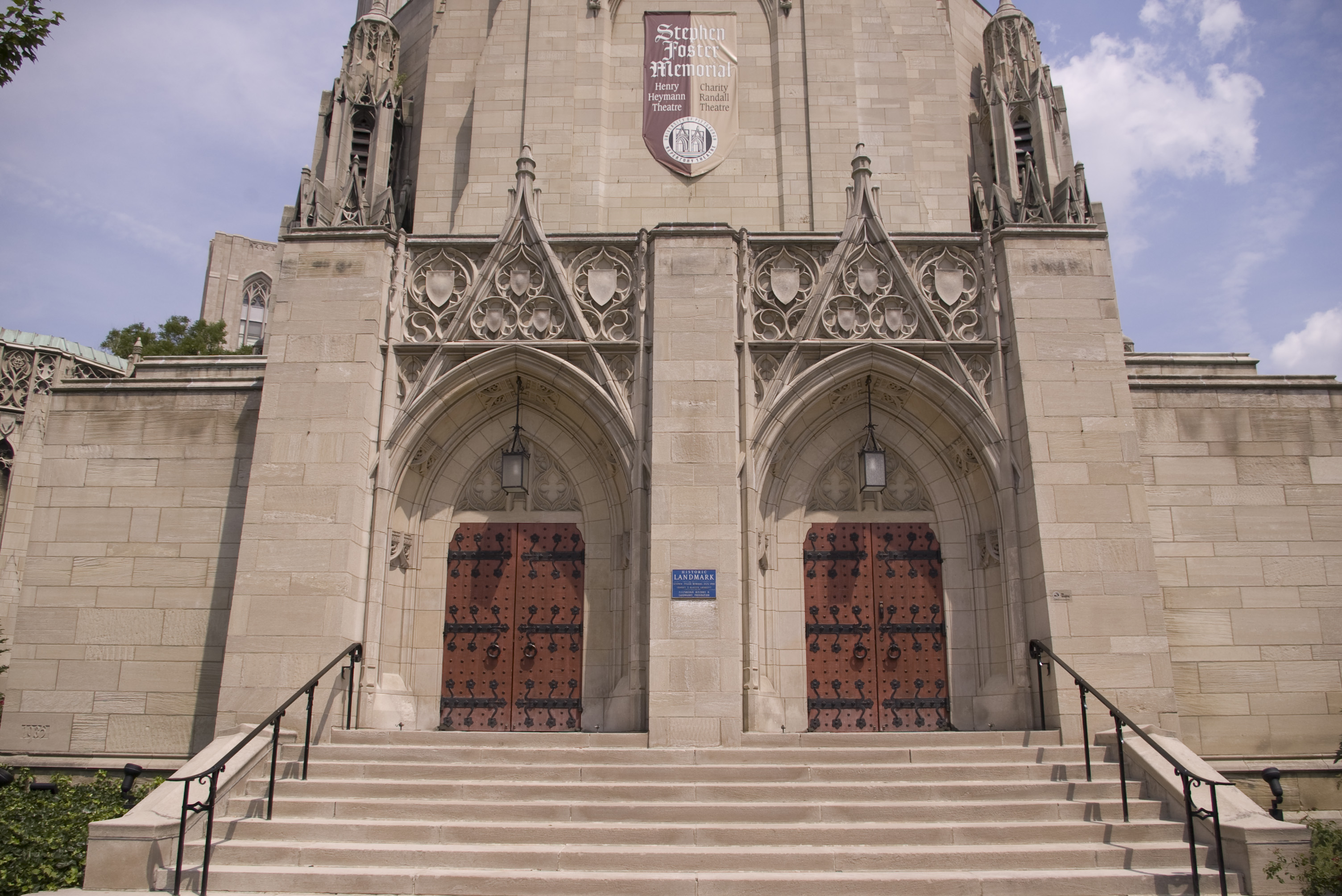
The memorial's double red doors

The memorial itself was conceived in 1927 when the Tuesday Musical Club, founded in 1889 by affluent female musicians, and University of Pittsburgh Chancellor John Bowman agreed to collaborate on a performance hall dedicated to Stephen Foster that would house the club's recitals. Bowman donated land adjacent to where the foundation for the Cathedral of Learning was being laid for the memorial. However, little progress on the memorial was made until 1932 when Bowman learned of Josiah Kirby Lilly's Foster Hall Collection. After Lilly pledged more than 10,000 Foster items, fund-raising began in earnest, with almost half the $550,000 cost coming from Lilly and his son, Eli. Construction began January 13, 1935, the 71st anniversary of Foster's death. A dedication ceremony took place on June 2, 1937, Pitt's 150th anniversary.

The Foster Hall Collection itself was established in 1930 by Josiah Kirby Lilly, noted for being the president of the prominent Indianapolis pharmaceutical manufacturer Eli Lilly and Company. The collection originally began as a retirement hobby based upon his lifelong love of Stephen Foster' s music, but it eventually grew into one of the major collections of American music and history. Lilly and his staff, with the help of some of Foster's relatives, as well as through contributions prompted by the publication of the Foster Hall Bulletin, accumulated over 10,000 Foster items. This initial collection was housed in Indianapolis in a small limestone building he called "Foster Hall." Before his effort began, there had been no exact knowledge concerning the total number of Foster's works, nor any accurate literature published about the composer. Foster Hall's staff identified 201 original works, and Foster Hall became a resource center for John Tasker Howard's biography Stephen Foster: America's Troubadour (1934). Concerned about the future of his collection, Lilly donated the Foster Hall's holdings to the University of Pittsburgh's new Stephen Foster Memorial and the collection was moved to its new home in 1937. Since then, some additional 20,000 items reflecting Foster, composers influenced by him, and music in American life have been added.

The university's Center for American Music also houses the Ethelbert Nevin Collection, which was previously housed in the Theodore M. Finney Music Library until 1999. The Nevin Collection was acquired by the University of Pittsburgh between 1933 and 1956. The materials in the collection were either purchased or donated by Mrs. Ethelbert Nevin, other family members, and friends. The collection consists of original manuscripts, letters, mementos, furnishings, printed matter, and special gifts.

Aside from maintaining the collections and museum, The Center for American Music's projects include Voices Across Time, a curriculum support package that allows teachers to integrate historic American Music into their classrooms. The center also has undertaken Resources of American History II that will provide global online access to music scores, papers, sound recordings, and other American music-related materials in its archives.

== See also ==
- Theatre in Pittsburgh
- List of music museums

== Bibliography ==
- Alberts, Robert C. (1987). Pitt: The Story of the University of Pittsburgh 1787-1987. Pittsburgh: University of Pittsburgh Press. ISBN 0-8229-1150-7.
- Kidney, Walter C. (1997). Pittsburgh's Landmark Architecture: The Historic Buildings of Pittsburgh and Allegheny County. Pittsburgh: Pittsburgh History & Landmarks Foundation. ISBN 0-916670-18-X.

Preceded by Heinz Memorial Chapel	University of Pittsburgh buildings Stephen Foster Memorial; Constructed: 1937	Succeeded by Salk Hall
