= Heinz Memorial Chapel =

- U.S. Historic district – Contributing property
- Pittsburgh Landmark – PHLF
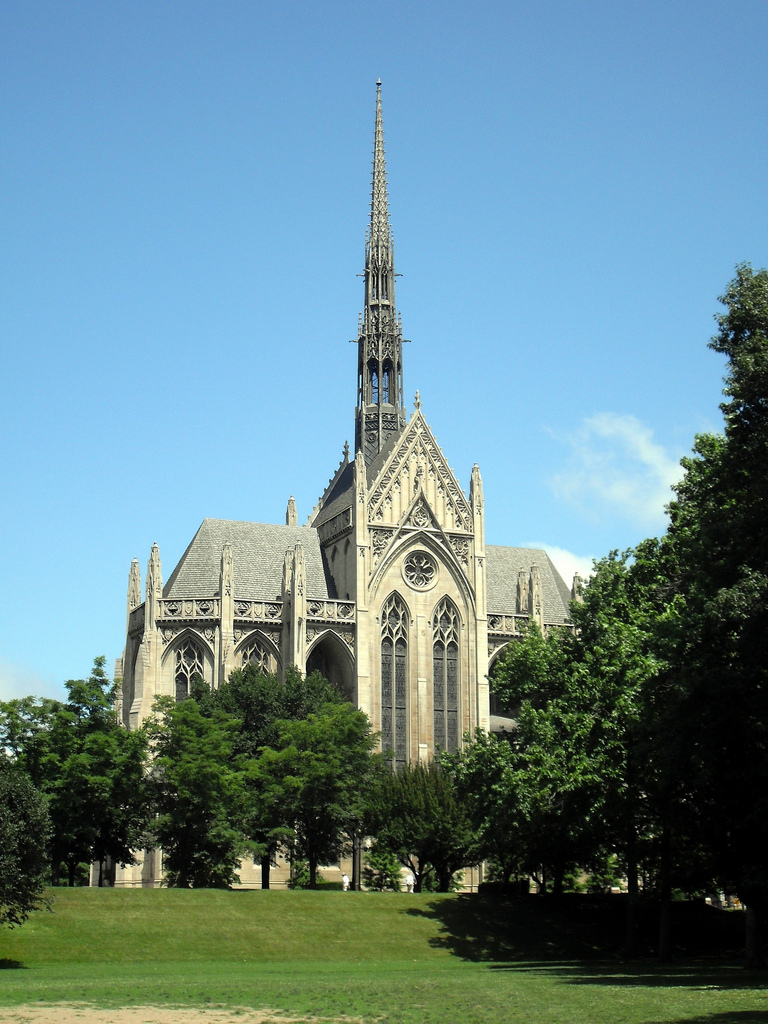
- Heinz Chapel at the University of Pittsburgh
- Location: Intersection of 5th Ave and S Bellefield Ave
- Nearest city: Pittsburgh, PA
- Coordinates: 40°26′43″N 79°57′06″W
- Built: 1933–1938
- Architect: Charles Klauder
- Architectural style: French Gothic Revival
- Part of: Schenley Farms Historic District (ID83002213)

Significant dates
- Added to NRHP: July 22, 1983
- Designated PHLF: 1973

Heinz Memorial Chapel is a Pittsburgh History and Landmarks Foundation Historic Landmark and a contributing property to the Schenley Farms National Historic District on the campus of the University of Pittsburgh in Pittsburgh, Pennsylvania, United States.

== History ==
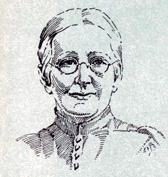
Anna Margaretha Heinz

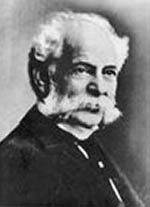
Henry J. Heinz

The chapel was a gift of German-American Henry John Heinz, founder of the H.J. Heinz Company, who wanted to honor his mother, Anna Margaretha Heinz, with a building at the university. Upon his death in 1919, Heinz's three surviving children (Howard, Irene, and Clifford) added to his bequest to memorialize their grandmother and honor their father. Their choice of a chapel for a memorial was guided by the concepts of education and religion which Anna Margaretta Heinz imbued in her children.

Howard Heinz, Chancellor John Gabbert Bowman, and Joh Weber, business manager and university secretary, were some of the passionate workers behind the chapel's concept and execution. Working with them were other members of the Heinz family, and two well-known clergymen, Dr. Hugh Thomson Kerr, pastor of Shadyside Presbyterian Church, and Dr. Henry Sloane Coffin, president of Union Theological Seminary.

Ground was broken in 1933 and the cornerstone was laid in 1934. At the chapel's dedication on November 20, 1938, Howard Heinz spoke of the meaning of the memorial chapel:

"It is located in a community where my father was born and lived his life. It is on the campus of a university. As part of that university, it is dedicated to culture, understanding response to beauty, and religious worship."

Chancellor Bowman commented at the cornerstone laying:

"The chapel is designed as a fitting center of worship which in various ways will rise at the University. The character, intensity, the level of that worship may change from generation to generation. The spiritual tide in men rises and falls. Through these changes though, the Chapel will stand, calm and undisturbed."

Since its dedication, the Heinz family and their philanthropies, as well as private donations from other various individuals, have provided ongoing financial support. In 1996, an addition to the chapel's north side containing an elevator provided a permanent structure that allows complete accessibility for those with disabilities. This $1.25 million addition, designed by Landmark Design Associates, was funded with grants from the Heinz Endowments and university capital funds.

== Historical timeline ==
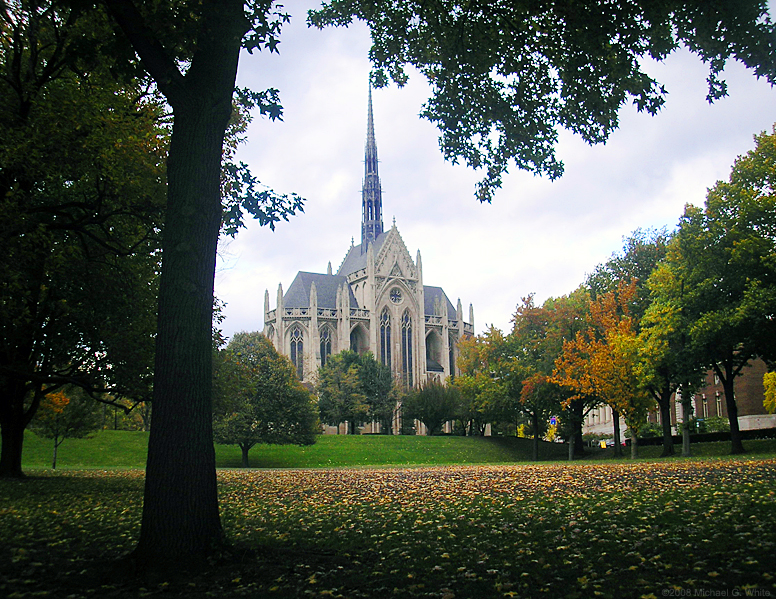
South side of Heinz Chapel in the Fall

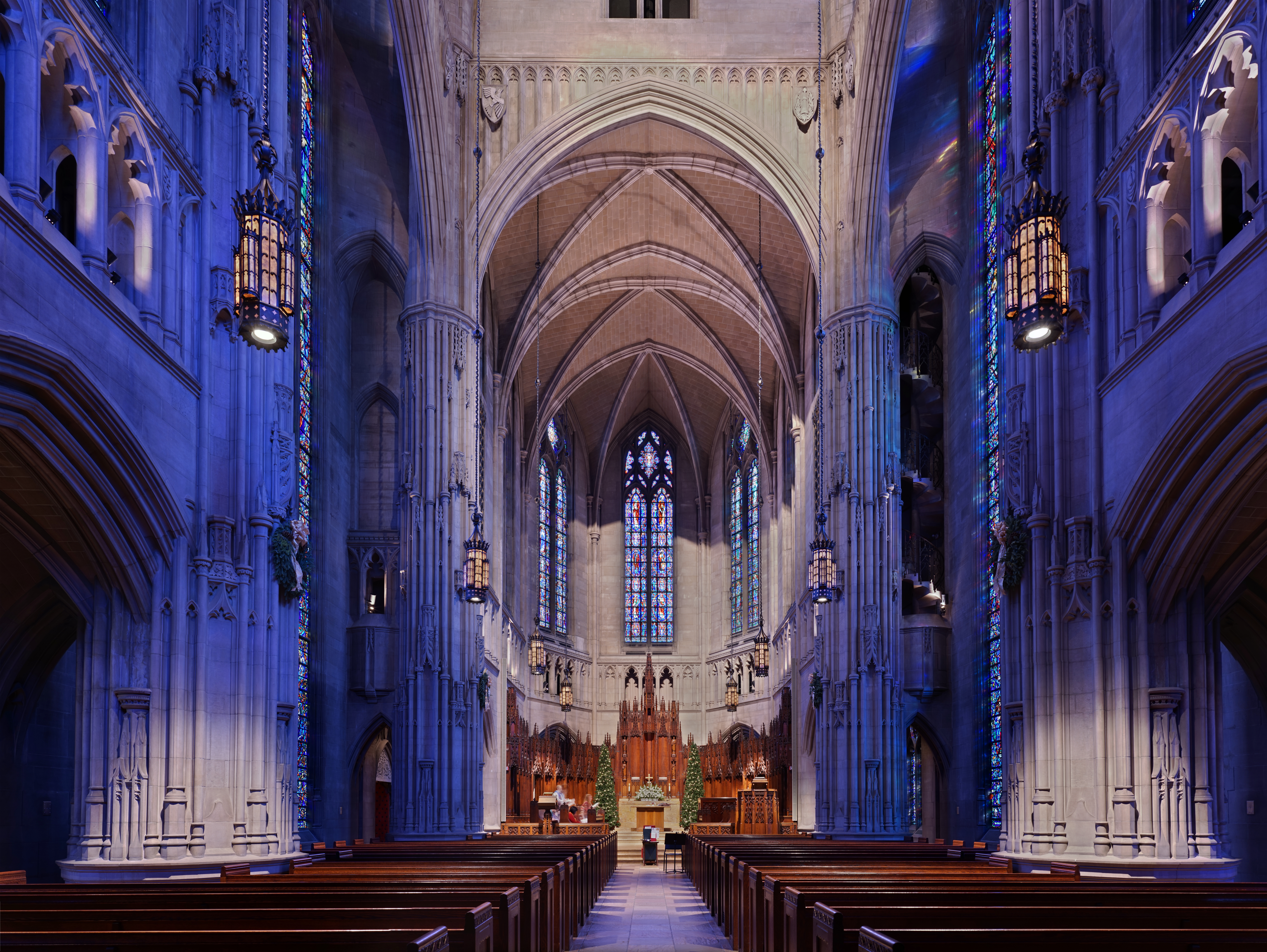
Interior of Heinz Chapel

- January 1914 – The Pittsburgh Gazette Times announces the gift of $100,000 from Henry John Heinz to erect a building in memory of his mother, Anna Margaritta Heinz. A letter addressed to the University of Pittsburgh board of trustees from H. J. Heinz states that the building be "exclusively used for the religious and social activities of the student body of the university".
- November 4, 1929 – A Deed of Gift is drawn up between Howard Heinz, Clifford Heinz, and Irene E. Given and the University of Pittsburgh.
- August 15, 1933 – Groundbreaking is held for the Heinz Memorial Chapel by W. F. Trimble and Sons, General Contractors.
- February 1934 – Cornerstone setting ceremonies were held.
- June 20, 1934 – A contract was signed by Howard Heinz for $24,000 to purchase Aeolian-Skinner pipe organ Opus 922; the instrument contained approximately 4,295 pipes, and 89 stops.
- November 20, 1938 – The chapel was dedicated at 2:30 p.m., as soon as the Skinner instrument installation was complete. Dr. Russell G. Wichmann, the first organist at Heinz Chapel, played at the dedication. Shadyside Presbyterian Church quartet, which he directed, and the University of Pittsburgh Chorus, participated.
- November 23, 1938 – The first student service was held in the chapel—a Thanksgiving Day service held a day early. Dr. Wichmann served as organist, accompanying the University of Pittsburgh Choir. The Alumni Review reported that all seats were filled well before the scheduled start of the service. According to the student ushers present, several hundred students were turned away.
- 1938 – Rev. Raymond F. Brittain of the university's Department of History of Religion, was appointed director of religious programs in the chapel.
- January 4, 1939 – Daily 9 a.m. and 1 p.m. programs instituted with fifteen minutes of organ music, followed by ten minutes of responsive reading, singing and prayer.
- December 18, 1939 – The first Vespers service in the chapel was held at 2:30 p.m.
- April 9, 1939 – A program first mentioned the "University Symphony Orchestra", for Easter Vespers. The ensemble included four violins, two violas and one cello.
- January 11, 1946 – The first wedding ceremony was held in the chapel.
- 1992 – A scene for the movie Lorenzo's Oil is filmed in Heinz Chapel.
- 1996 – An addition was added to the north side of the chapel.

== Uses ==
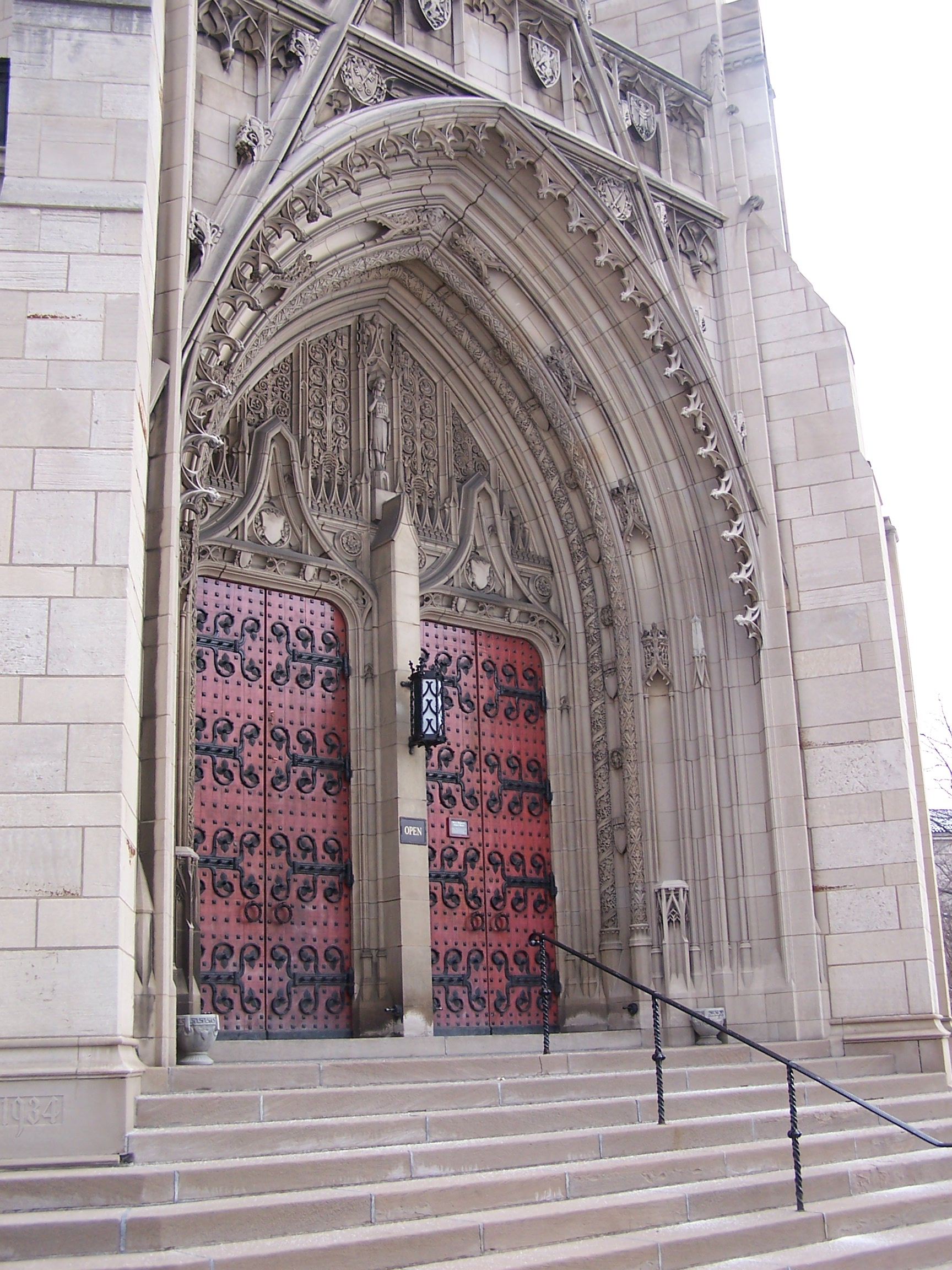
The tympanum and main doors

Heinz Memorial Chapel is used for various religious services, but as intended from its beginning, it is interdenominational. The chapel is open daily throughout the year except for university holidays, and approximately 1,500 events involving more than 100,000 people take place there annually including religious services, weddings, concerts, classes, memorial services, and guided tours. Between 170 and 190 weddings, which are restricted to affiliates of the University of Pittsburgh and the Heinz employees, are held each year in the chapel. It also serves as the home of the Heinz Chapel Choir.

Throughout the school year, the 20-voice Pittsburgh Compline Choir, directed by Mr. David P Bridge, sings Compline at 8:00 on Sunday evenings. The Order of Service used by the choir is an expanded version of the Order for Compline in the Lutheran Book of Worship. Compline at Heinz Chapel is a ministry of the Lutheran University Center and First Lutheran Church in Downtown Pittsburgh.

== Design ==
=== Architecture ===
The neo-Gothic chapel was designed by Charles Klauder who also designed the Cathedral of Learning and the Stephen Foster Memorial, both located right next to the chapel on Pitt's campus. He was assisted by university architect A. A. Klimcheck. Dr. John G. Bowman, chancellor of the university, and Mr. John Weber, secretary of the university, whom Dr. Bowman sent to Europe to study church architecture for background on the chapel, worked closely with Mr. Klauder in the attempt to achieve on this campus a physical representation of the meaning of a university chapel.

The chapel's form is that of a modified cruciform plan, stone vaults, high ceilings, repeated arches, and extensive use of glass that were typical of American academic and religious architecture of this period. It is 146 feet (45 m) long, 55 feet (17 m) wide at the transept, and 100 feet (30 m) high at the nave with its fleche (not called a steeple) reaching 256 feet (78 m) above the ground. The chapel's walls, inside and out, are of Indiana Limestone.

Sadly, Klauder died only a few weeks before the chapel's dedication.

In 1996, a $1.3 million elevator housing was added to north side of Heinz Chapel in order to bring in into compliance with the Americans with Disabilities Act. The small addition was designed to architecturally mesh with the remainder of the chapel.

=== Stonework ===
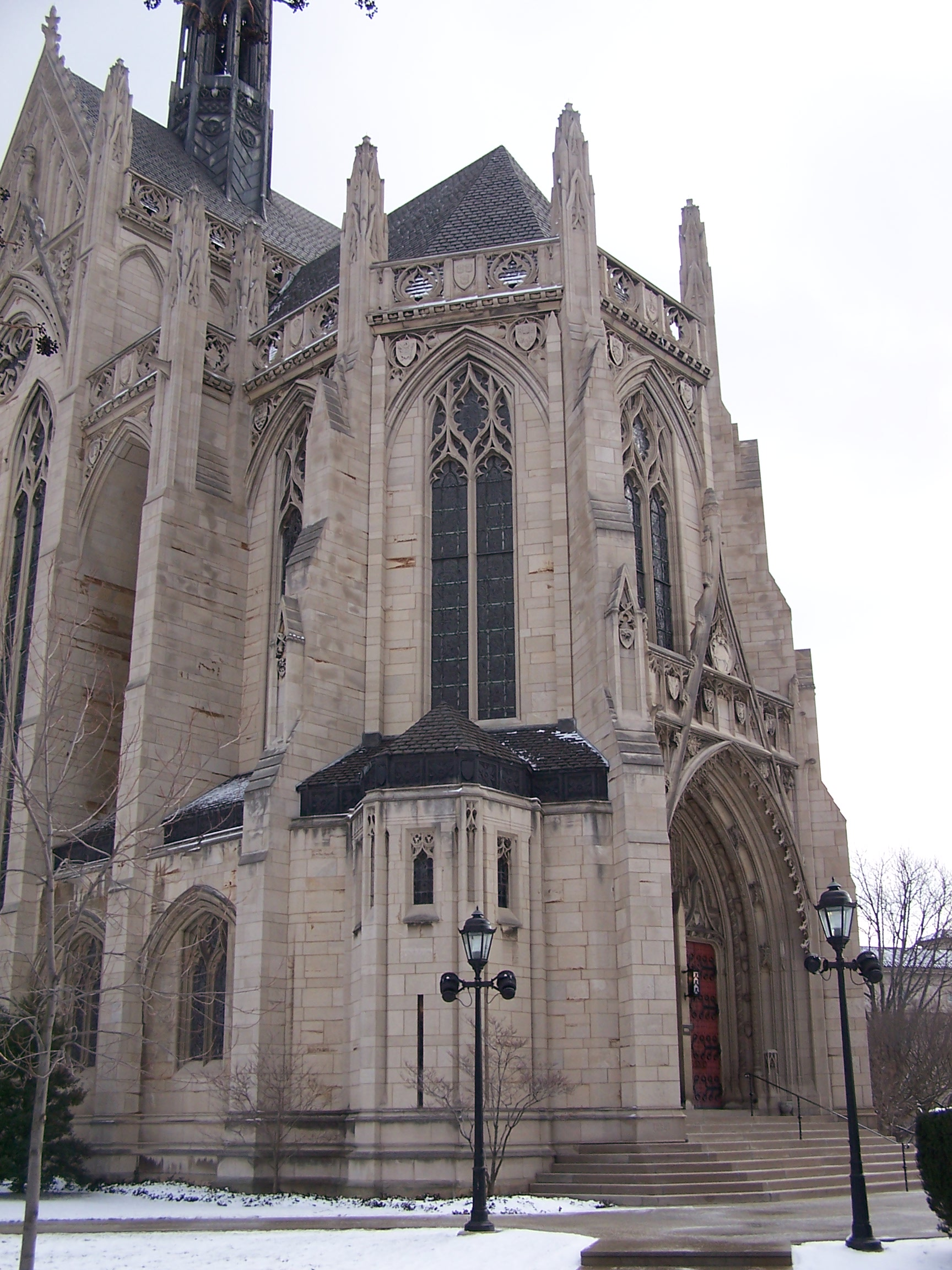
The narthex entrance

Both inside and out, the walls of the chapel are of grey Indiana limestone. The interior ceiling is lined with a structural acoustical tile which, although it is a ceramic product, approximates stone. The floor of the chapel is crab orchard stone with Vermont green slate in the side aisles. The floor of the chancel is marble while the altar itself is of Numidian marble, imported from Egypt.

The chapel's wall carvings, by master stoneworker Joseph Gattoni of New York, follow the Gothic tradition of pictorial instruction and express the chapel's theme of spiritual values in education. Charles Connick's studio, who is best known for designing the stained glass windows, also designed a large portion of the chapel's stonework, including the Gothic-style shields adorning the stone walls and the tympanum above the main door that portrays the figure of Jesus with symbols of the Alpha and the Omega.

==== Exterior façade carving ====
The tympanum, or recessed arch over the main portal, reflects both the medieval craft of pictorial instruction and the interest of Henry Heinz in the spiritual teachings of his church through his own Sunday school experiences, thus setting the theme for the entire chapel.

The main figure is that of the boy Jesus, relating His youthful revelation to the doctors in the Temple (Luke 2:46–57) . He holds a book inscribed with the first and last letters of the Greek alphabet, Alpha and Omega, between which all human thought is contained.

To the left of the figure of Jesus is the small figure of Moses with the Tables of Law. Beneath Moses, entwined within the branches of a Tree of Life design, are medallions with portraits of the Prophets Isaiah and Jeremiah, the Patriarchs Abraham and Jacob, the Priests Aaron and Melchezedech, and King David .

On the right of the figure of Jesus is the small figure of St. Luke, beneath which are again medallions within a Tree of Life. These represent St. Luke's and Jesus' spiritual progeny: in charity, St. Francis of Assisi; in imagination, Leonardo da Vinci; in understanding, Newton; in healing, Pasteur; in eloquence, Wordsworth; in leadership, Lincoln; in thought, Emerson.

Outside, the insignia of Europe's twelve oldest universities are carved on shields on the gables. Below that on the balustrade parapets are college and universities founded in the United States before 1820. The spandrels beneath show seals of those founded after 1820 and the seals of women's colleges are on the buttresses.

==== Seals and shields ====
===== Entrance portal =====
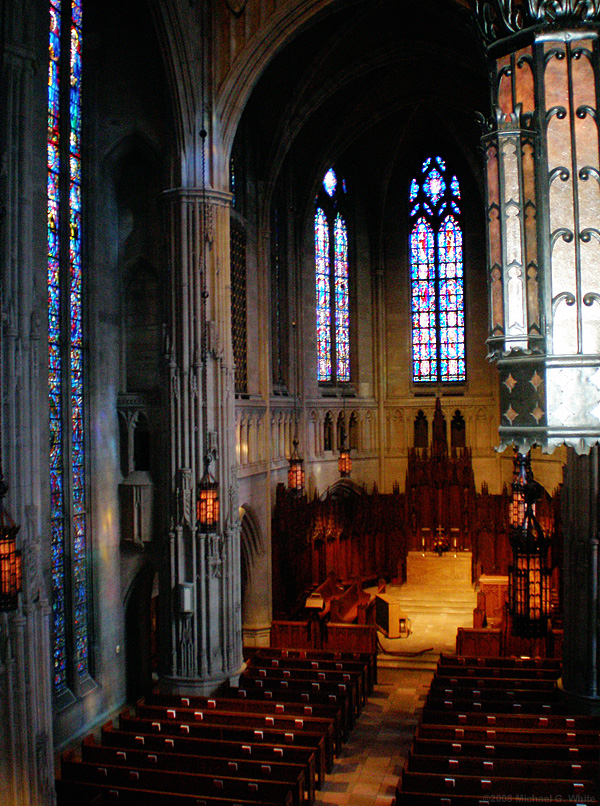
Interior of Heinz Chapel as viewed from the balcony

The seal of the University of Pittsburgh, the 1930s candle version, is just above the main entrance and is flanked by the seal of the City of Pittsburgh and the Commonwealth of Pennsylvania. Inside, the stone carvings include the Torah and the Bible, the New Testament beatitudes, and shields of the twelve Apostles. The carvings often take up and extend the theme of the window nearest them.

===== Parapets =====
In the gables and balustrade circling the transept at its highest point and signifying the chapel's dedication to education, are shields bearing the insignia of the twelve oldest European universities in order of their founding.

Along the lower balustrade parapet are carved the seals of American colleges and universities founded before 1820, in order of their founding. The seals of those founded after 1820 are on the spandrels beneath the parapet, and the seals of women's colleges are carved on the buttresses.

===== Narthex =====
To the right and left of the entrance, in the Narthex, two shields represent the Old and New Testaments with the Pentateuch and the Bible.

===== Chancel =====
At the base of the Faith, Hope and Charity windows are the shields of the twelve apostles, each represented by his symbol.

Under the Justice and Wisdom windows are fourteen shields representing the fourteen beatitudes, or gifts of the soul, as they appear in the carving of the Cathedral of Chartres.

===== North door =====
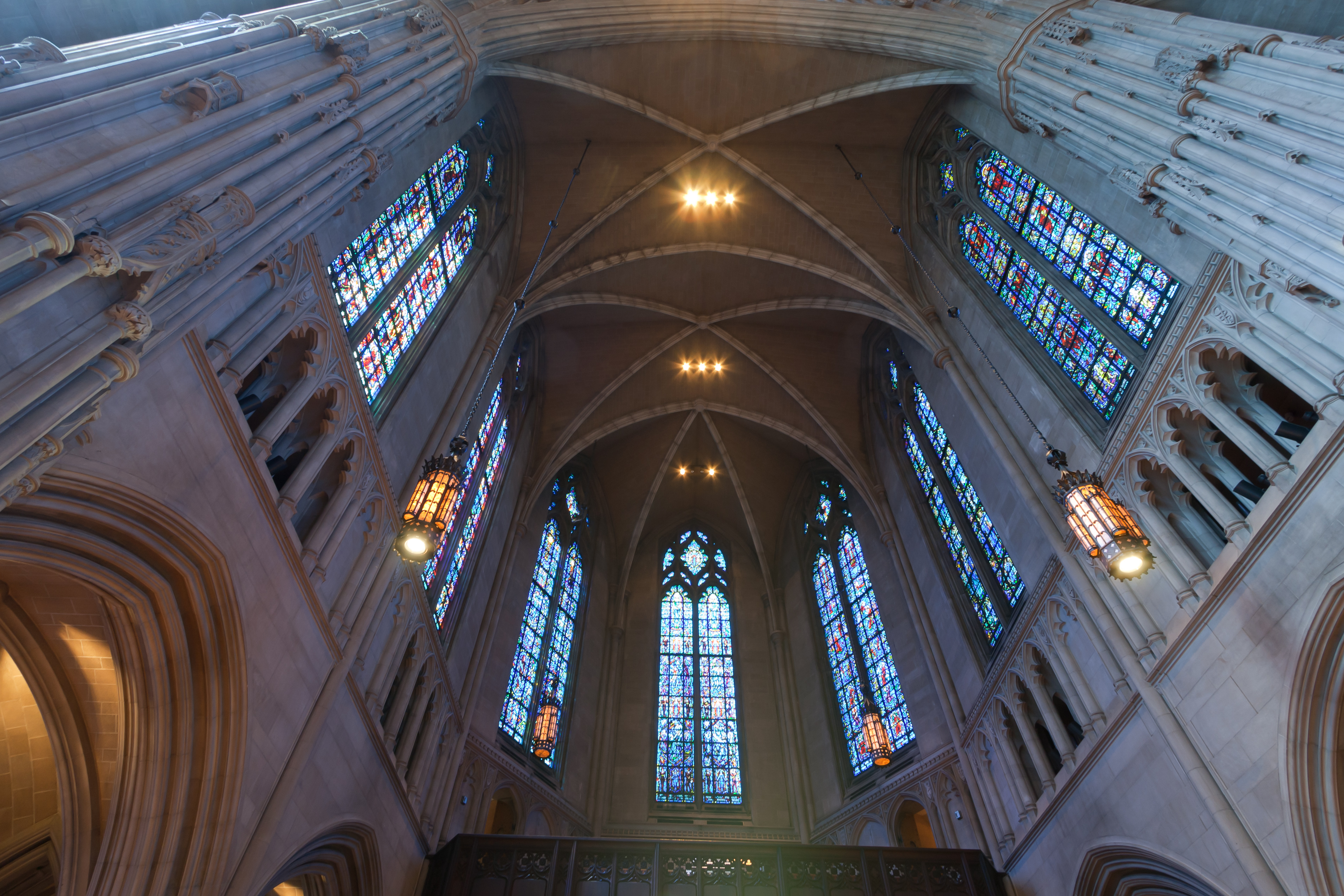
The clerestory of Heinz Chapel

Over the small door to the left of the chancel as one faces it, is carved the Sacred Monogram above a Tree of Life. Flanking the door are the unicorn, symbol of goodness, and the phoenix, symbol of immortality.

===== Ambulatory doors =====
On either side of the doors leading into the ambulatory are shields representing the four Major Prophets: Isaiah (tongs and burning altar coal), Jeremiah (star-tipped wand), Ezekiel (tetramorph), and Daniel (ram with horns).

===== Memorial window shields =====
Echoing the theme of the window are symbols of music, the harp and the lyre, early instruments used in songs of praise.

===== Transept =====
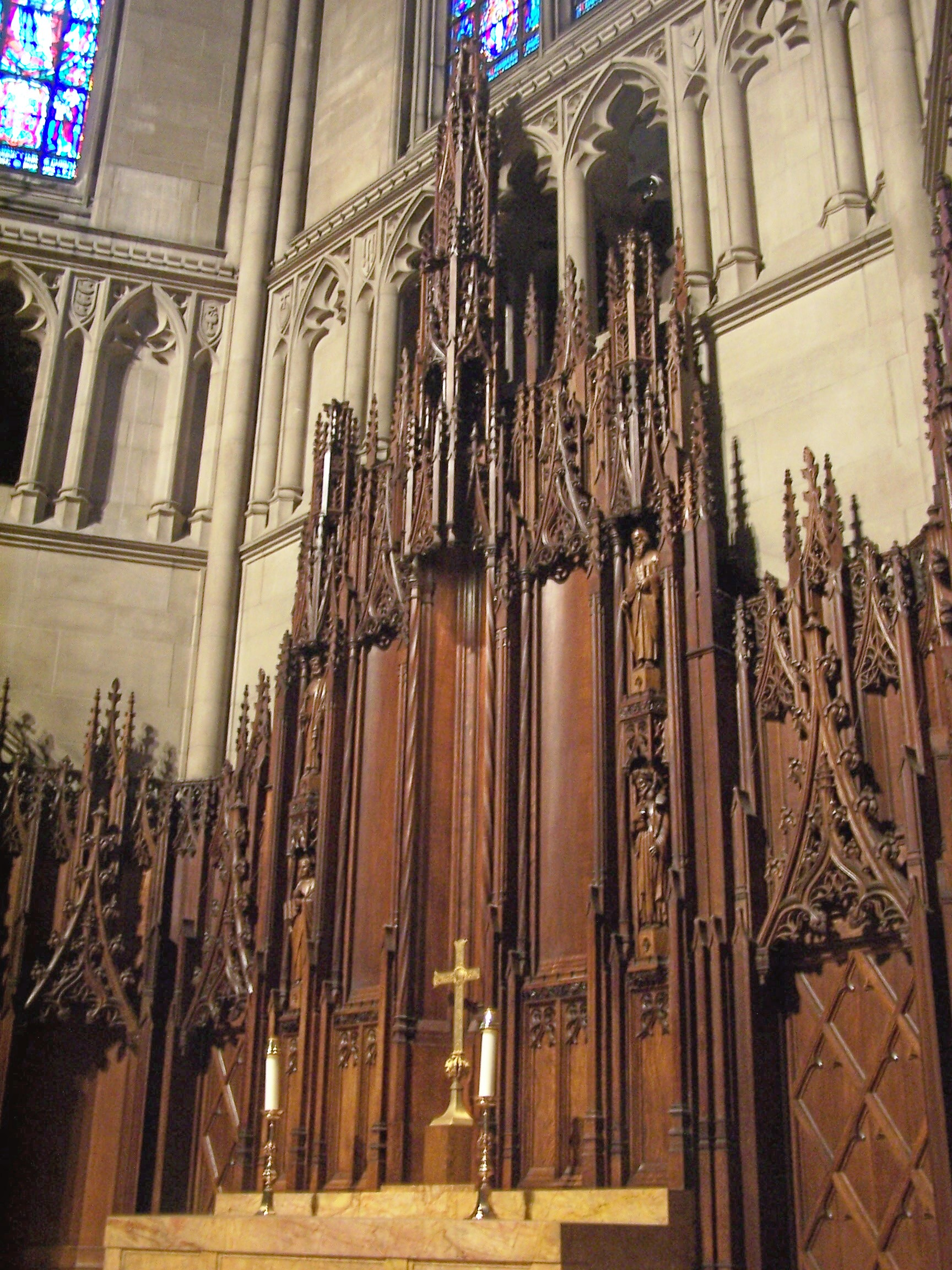
Heinz Chapel reredos

In the spandrels of the great arches of the transept crossing, eight large shields represent the eight beatitudes given in the Sermon on the Mount.

===== Aisle window shields =====
North aisle shields – symbols of the Doctors of the Western, or Latin Church.

South aisle shields – symbols of the Doctors of the Eastern, or Greek Church.

===== Clerestory shields =====
At the base of the clerestory windows, between the small arches of the triforium gallery are fourteen shields which represent the seven liberal arts and the seven medieval crafts and trades.

===== Narthex shields =====
At the base of the Narthex windows are twelve shields which echo the theme of each window.

=== Wood and iron work ===
All the visible wood in the chapel is oak, including its entrance doors, each of which weighs 800 pounds. The reredos, choir stalls, chancel rails, pulpit, lectern, and narthex screen are of English pollard oak. The pews and narthex ceiling are of Appalachian Mountain oak. Wood carvings were done by Irving and Casson, A.H. Davenport Company of Boston. The four figures carved in the reredos represent the saints Peter, John, Paul the Apostle, and James the Major. All the wrought iron work, including the lanterns, door fittings, stair railings, altar cross, and candlesticks, were created by Samuel Yellin of Philadelphia. (Yellin was also responsible for major working in the adjacent Cathedral of Learning including the Commons Room Gates and most of the metal work in the Nationality Classrooms .)

== The windows ==
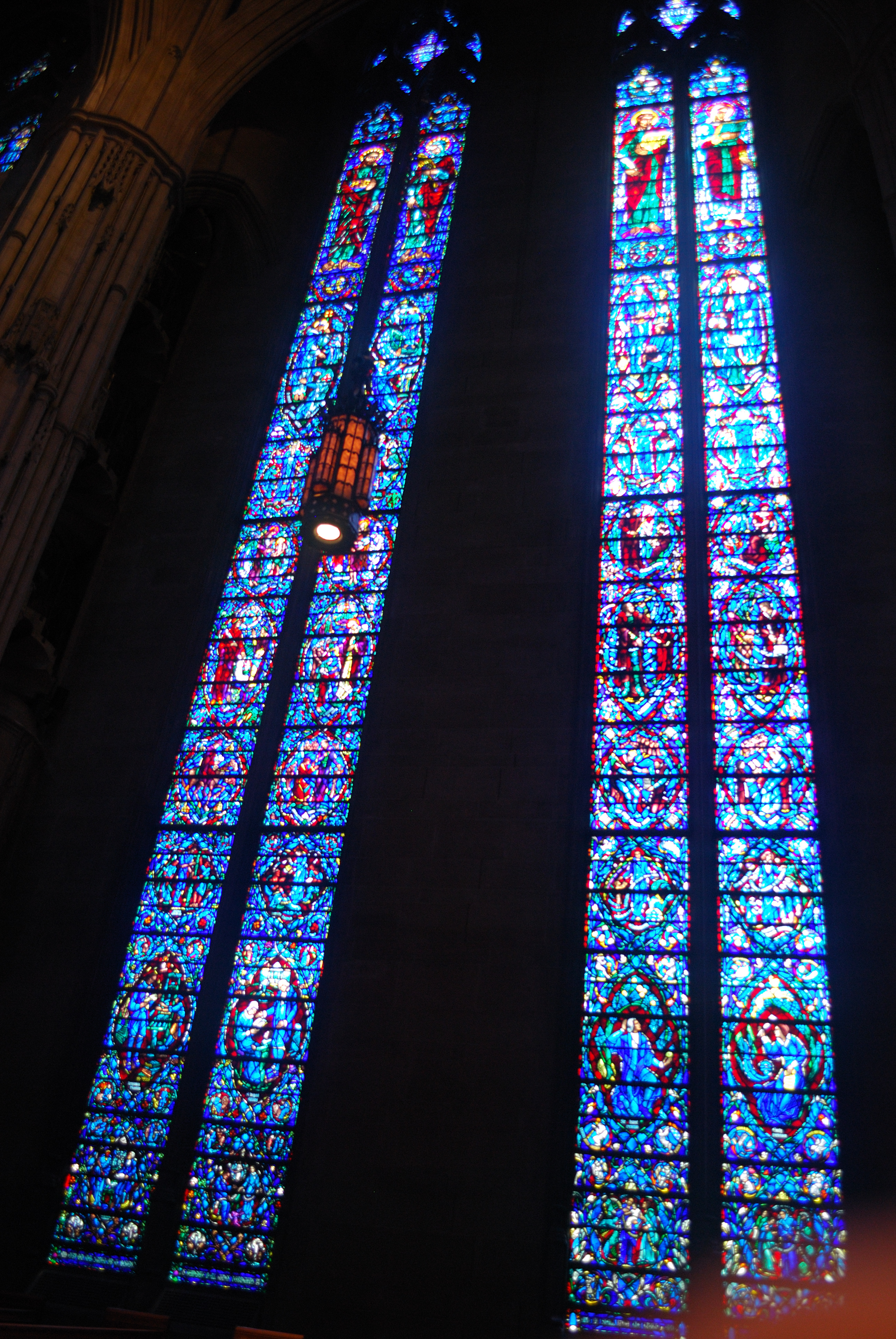
South transept windows of Heinz Memorial Chapel

=== Designer ===
The chapel's 23 windows were designed by prominent stained glass artist Charles Connick and created at his Boston studio. The windows, which have been regarded by many as Connick's most important commission, total approximately 4,000 square feet (370 m^{2}) and contain nearly 250,000 pieces of glass. There are 391 identifiable people in the windows, a large supporting cast of anonymous individuals, and an extensive variety of flora and fauna.

Connick was an artist once on the staff of the Pittsburgh Press, and author of Adventures in Light and Color, a work which he has modestly subtitled An Introduction to the Stained Glass Craft. Mr. Connick also has windows in the Cathedrals of St. Patrick and St. John the Divine in New York City, the Princeton University Chapel, the American Church in Paris, and in the Calvary Episcopal and East Liberty Presbyterian churches in Pittsburgh. Heinz Memorial Chapel has the distinction of having all its windows by Mr. Connick, a practice unusual in most churches which prefer to represent in their sanctuaries as many kinds of stained glass artistry as possible. However, because in Heinz Chapel all the windows can be seen at once, and because Mr. Connick began to work so closely with those planning the chapel, and was so widely respected as a worker in stained glass, he was soon commissioned to design and make all of the windows in Heinz Chapel.

=== Design elements ===
Just as in the language of stone carvings, symbols were used in place of words, there was established a language of color in which the colors themselves had meanings and values. In his Divine Comedy, Dante set forth the traditions of this symbolism, and Mr. Connick used this language in Heinz Chapel to express emotions beyond the reach of words.

- Red - the warm active color; suggesting passionate devotion, divine love, self-sacrifice, heroism and valor.
- Blue – the cool contemplative color echoing the light of heaven; symbolic of divine wisdom, profound meditation, enduring loyalty, eternity.
- White – spiritual achievement, treasure in heaven.

And in combination:

- Gold – yellow merging into brown, changing to gold, symbolic of the treasures of earth; bounty.
- Green – unites the wisdom of blue with the wealth of gold; hope and victory, happiness and gaiety; spring, youth.
- Violet – unites the wisdom of blue with the love of red; justice, humility, royalty.

While the dominant theme of the chapel is charity, as declared by the Charity window, centered high above the chancel, blue is the most prominent color used in the windows, due to the requirements of stained glass artistry. "Blue is light itself," Mr. Connick has said, and he regarded it as the most valuable and lovely color in stained glass.

=== Chancel windows ===
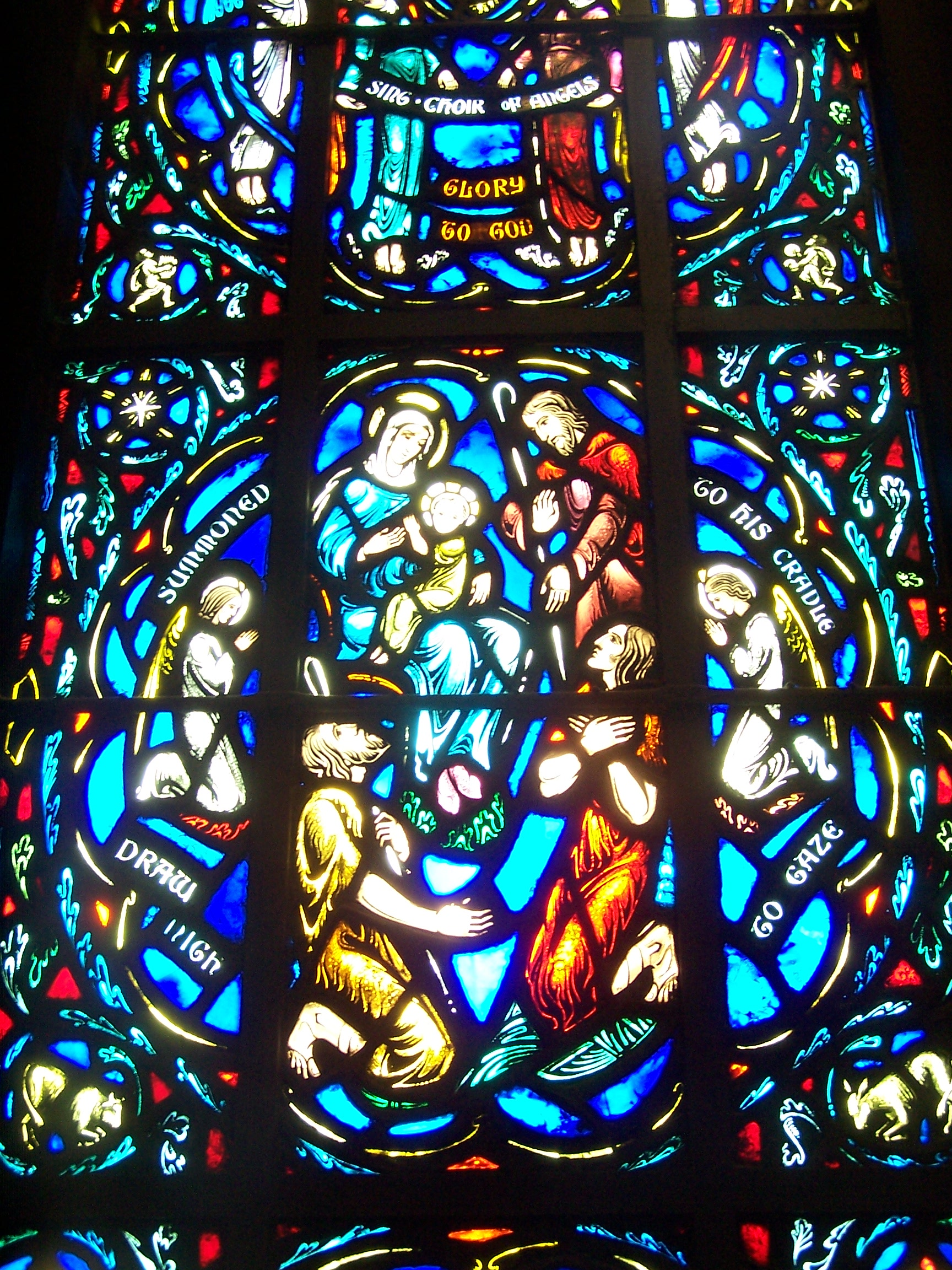
Nativity scene

The five chancel windows represent the virtues of justice, faith, charity, hope, and wisdom. These feature acts of Jesus and characters from the Old and New Testament. These windows are complemented on each side by smaller windows over the choir stalls that celebrate music and recognize its importance in worship.

The theme of each window is further developed through the use of symbols related to the Tree of Life. The symbol of love, the rose, appears in the Charity Window; the fig tree symbolizes Faith; the pomegranate, Hope; the grapevine, Justice; and the Twelve Golden Fruits of the Tree of Life, Wisdom.

=== Transept windows ===
The 73-foot (22 m) tall transept windows are among the tallest stained glass windows in the world and represent temperance, truth, tolerance, and courage. An equal number of men and women are depicted in these windows, unusual in that the equal emphasis on the contributions of both sexes was not typical of the period of their creation. There are a tremendous variety of individuals depicted in these windows drawn from religion and all aspects of secular history, music, science, philosophy, poetry and literature. Secular figures range from Beethoven and Bach to Clara Barton; from Da Vinci to Daniel Boone; from Charlemagne to Chaucer to Confucius; from Emily Dickinson to Keats to Sir Isaac Newton; form Napoleon to Ben Franklin and George Washington; from Rousseau to Shakespeare to Florence Nightingale; from Pocahontas to Pasteur and Edgar Allan Poe; from Tennyson to Thoreau, and a myriad in between including Johnny Appleseed.

=== Clerestory windows ===
The four clerestory windows, high above the aisles, present great teachers and interpreters of Christian thought. The three gallery windows at the west end of the chapel represent three great Christian literary works:

- St. Francis of Assisi's Canticle of the Sun Also called the Praise and Thanksgiving window, the left narthex window preserves in stained glass the Canticle of the Sun by St. Francis of Assisi. The canticle is pictured in the series of medallions and forms, articulated by stars, birds, fishes and hovering flames. The great surmounting figures are Brother Sun and Sister Moon, below which are personifications of the four elements – Air, Water, Fire, Earth. The small medallion designs are related to the life of St. Francis. The center tracery piece contains the figure of God as the Divine Creator.
- John Bunyan's Pilgrim's Progress The central Narthex window presents John Bunyan's allegoric Pilgrim's Progress, symbolically tracing the pilgrim's journey from angular shapes at the window's base to the bursting fruit of the Tree of Life at its top. The dominant figures of Christian and Hopeful surmount the lancets. The center tracery piece presents the New Jerusalem, with Enoch, Moses and Elijah welcoming the Pilgrim at journey's end.
- The Quest for the Holy Grail from Sir Thomas Malory's Le Morte d'Arthur. Also called the Holy Grail Window, the right narthex window traces the story of the search for the Holy Grail as told in Sir Thomas Malory's Le Morte d'Arthur. Sir Galahad and Sir Percivale's sister are the dominant figures surmounting the lancets. The growing forms most often take the shape of lilies, symbols of Purity. In the corners are designs of heraldic lions (symbols of Courage), Unicorns (symbols of Virginity), and Serpents and Dragons (sinfulness and the Power of Evil), suggesting the ideals of Chivalry and the temptations besetting the searchers. The center tracery piece presents the Vision of the Grail at the end of the search.

== The organ ==
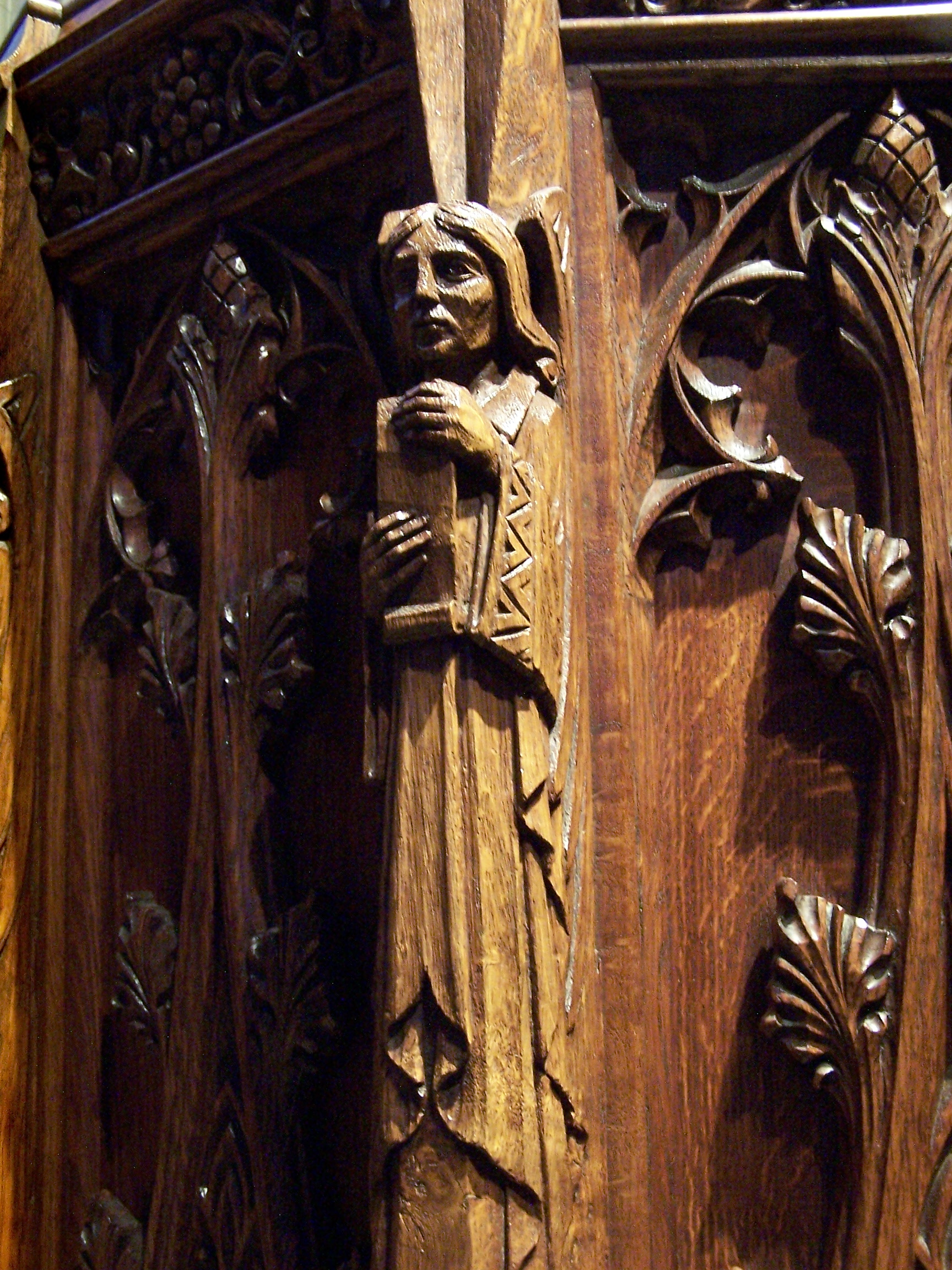
Pulpit detail

=== Original instrument ===
The chapel organ was originally a four manual Aeolian Skinner pipe organ with 3,770 pipes. Construction on the organ began in Boston in 1934 and took several years to complete.

The organ pipes range in size from the size of a pencil up to wooden boxes two feet square. The console itself was in a sunken recess at the right of the chancel and the pipes were concealed behind the chancel triforium gallery and the gold and blue ecclesiastical cloth above the gallery.

=== Updated instrument ===
In the 1960s, the cloth was gradually removed, it was deteriorating, had a detrimental effect on the organ sound and presented a fire hazard. By this time, the organ was in serious need of attention and in 1969 work was begun on the installation of a new instrument by the M. P. Möller Company. This included the addition of a small gallery console which could be used to play only those pipes in the rear gallery, useful for duets or if the main instrument required emergency service.

The new Moller instrument was dedicated on March 21, 1971, by University Organist, Dr. Robert S. Lord and Dr. Russell G. Wichmann, organist at Chatham College. This instrument had approximately 3,954 pipes and 82 stops and 70 ranks (unique sounds). The Heinz Endowments funded this purchase.

The organ was greatly enhanced by the addition of three electronic 32' ranks by the Allen Organ Company in January 1989 under the supervision of Dr. Lord made possible by a grant from the Heinz endowments. This permitted the organ to produce deep, resonant bass tones. It was one of the first uses of electronic sounds to enhance an existing pipe organ.

=== Current instrument ===
In the early 1990s, the Möller became increasingly unreliable and it was deemed necessary to perform major work on the instrument. This coincided with the work done in 1994 to make the chapel accessible for those with physical disabilities. The Reuter Organ Company was engaged to do this work.

The renovated Reuter instrument was dedicated in concert on September 24, 1995. Re-created in 1994–1995 by the Reuter Organ Company, it represents a trend in American organ building to reuse existing materials in an environmentally friendly and musically sound manner. The chancel console has three manuals (keyboards) and pedalboard that control all 4,272 pipes (73 ranks) and three electronic 32' pedal stops. For concerts, this console may be moved to the front of the chancel in full view of the audience. A second console (two manuals and pedal) located in the rear gallery controls pipes located in the alcoves adjacent to the gallery. The main console also has access to the rear gallery pipes. While most of the main organ pipes are located around the front chancel a commanding "tuba" (trumpet) stop is located 90 feet (27 m) above in a ceiling chamber.

A complete history of the organ is available in the Docent Guide for the Organ at Heinz Chapel the first edition of which was prepared in 2003 by Jon J. Danzak. A copy of the book as well as two CDs were placed on deposit at the Music Library of the University of Pittsburgh by Dr. Robert S. Lord (Professor Emeritus) who served as university organist for over 40 years.

Preceded by Falk School	University of Pittsburgh buildings Heinz Chapel; Constructed: 1933-1938	Succeeded by Stephen Foster Memorial
