= Adam Leibovich =

American physicist

- Born: March 23, 1970 (age 56); Ithaca, New York

Academic background
- Education: BA, 1992, Cornell University; PhD, 1997, California Institute of Technology
- Thesis: Quarkonia production in nonrelativistic quantum chromodynamics (1998)
- Doctoral advisor: Mark B. Wise

Academic work
- Institutions: University of Pittsburgh

Adam Leibovich (born March 23, 1970) is an American theoretical physicist. He is a full professor and the Bettye J. and Ralph E. Bailey Dean of the Kenneth P. Dietrich School of Arts and Sciences and the College of General Studies at the University of Pittsburgh. His research is primarily in quantum chromodynamics (QCD) and the application of effective field theory to problems of hadronic physics, particularly particles containing one or more heavy quarks. Leibovich also has worked on gravitational wave physics. He was elected a fellow of the American Physical Society in 2017 and a fellow of the American Association for the Advancement of Science in 2018.

== Early life and education ==
Leibovich is the son of Sidney Leibovich, the Samuel B. Eckert Professor of Mechanical Engineering Emeritus at Cornell University. Adam Leibovich graduated from Cornell University with his Bachelor of Arts in physics, magma cum laude with honors, and attended the California Institute of Technology for his Ph.D. After completing his doctoral degree in 1997, he accepted postdoctoral positions at Carnegie Mellon University and Fermilab.

== Career ==
Leibovich joined the University of Pittsburgh's (Pitt) Department of Physics and Astronomy as an assistant professor of physics in 2003. His research at Pitt focuses on QCD, heavy quark physics, and gravitational wave physics. As a result of his research, he received an NSF CAREER award in 2006. A popular instructor, Leibovich has also won teaching awards, including a 2006 Cottrell Scholar from the Research Corporation for Science Advancement and the Tina and David Bellet Teaching Award from the Dietrich School of Arts and Sciences at Pitt in 2010. Leibovich was named a fellow of the American Physical Society in 2017 and a fellow of the American Association for the Advancement of Science in 2018.

Leibovich was promoted to associate professor with tenure in 2008 and full professor in 2015. He has held a variety of administrative rules during his time at Pitt, including Chair of Physics and Astronomy from 2015 to 2017, associate dean for Faculty Recruitment and Research Development from 2017 to 2021, and the associate dean for Research and Faculty Development. from 2021 to 2023 in the Dietrich School of Arts and Sciences where he oversaw research in the School, faculty hiring, and some budgetary issues, among other items. He was the director of the Pittsburgh Quantum Institute from 2022 to 2023. On July 1, 2023, Leibovich started as the Dean of the Kenneth P. Dietrich School of Arts and Sciences and the College of General Studies.

== Awards and honors ==
- 2004 Ralph E. Powe Junior Faculty Enhancement Award
- 2006 National Science Foundation Career Award
- 2006 Research Corporation for Science Advancement - Cottrell Scholar Award
- 2010 Tina and David Bellet Teaching Excellence Award
- 2017 Elected fellow of the American Physical Society
- 2018 Elected fellow of the American Association for the Advancement of Science
