= Bouquet Gardens =

Apartment complex at the University of Pittsburgh's main campus

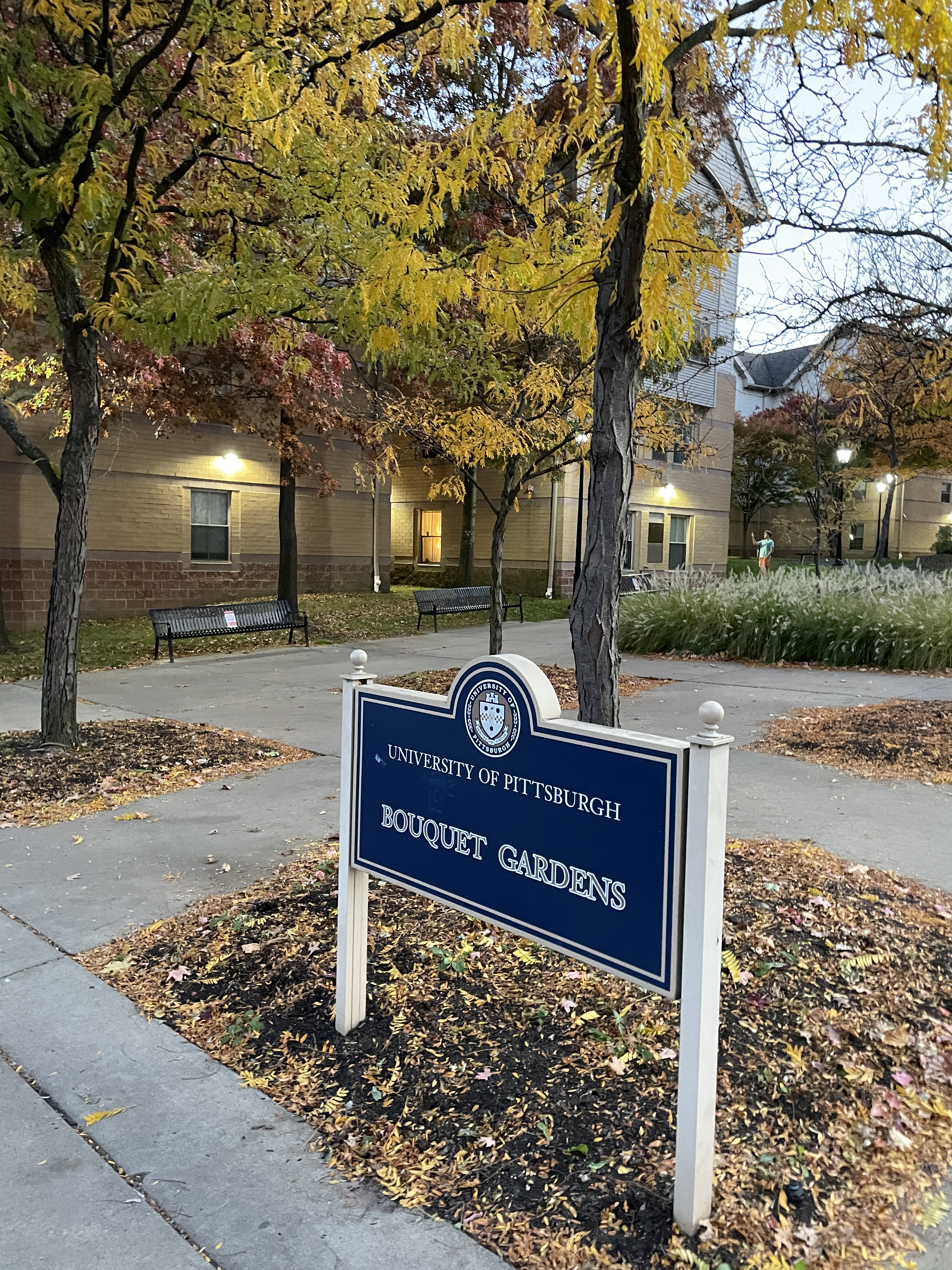
- Photo of the University of Pittsburgh's Bouquet Gardens complex of apartment buildings for students, housing hundreds of upper-level undergraduate students
- Interactive map of Bouquet Gardens

General information
- Location: Oakland neighborhood, Pittsburgh
- Coordinates: 40°26′27″N 79°57′19″W
- Current tenants: 651 upper-level students
- Owner: University of Pittsburgh

Design and construction
- Architecture firm: Renaissance 3 Architects, P.C.

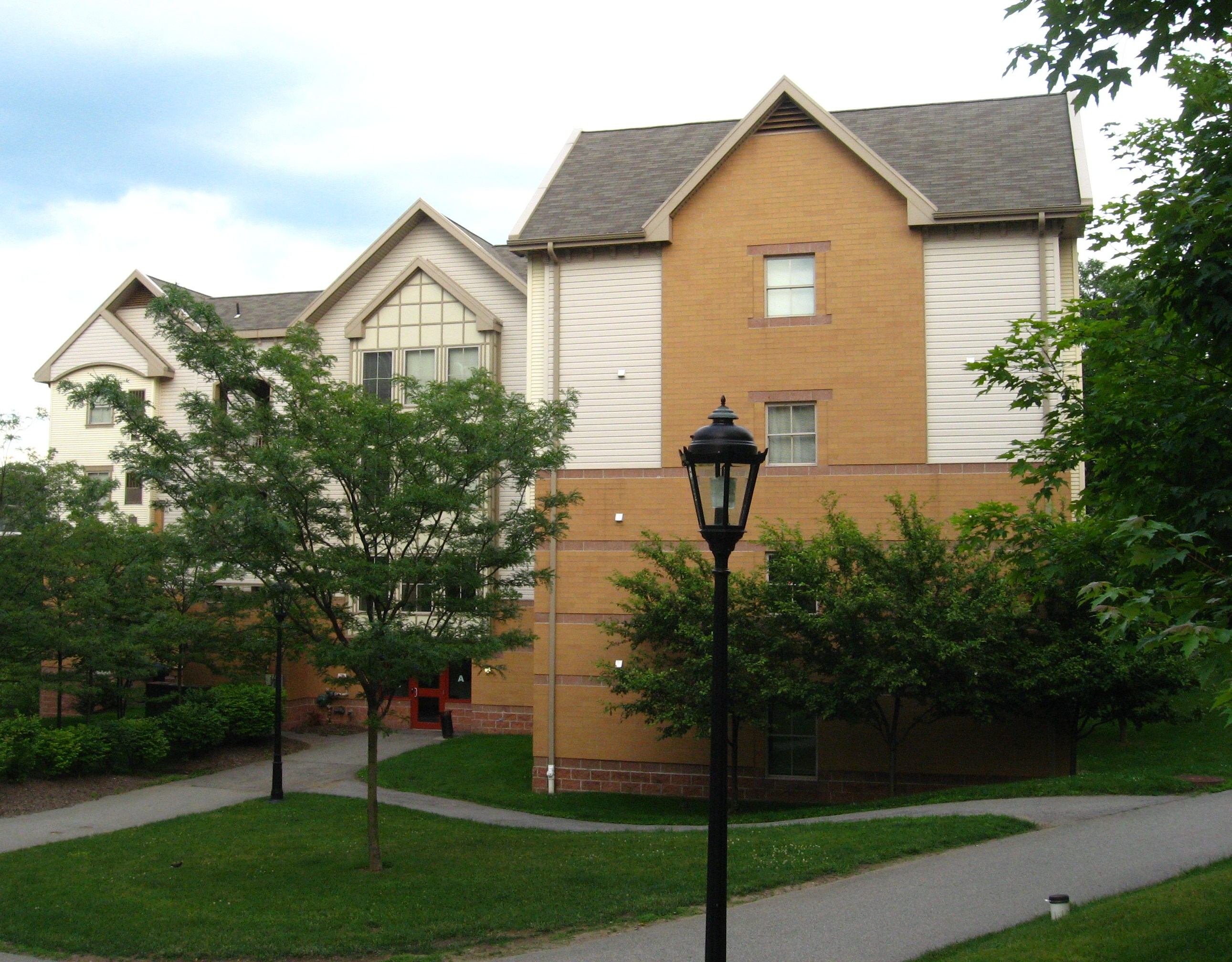
Bouquet Gardens at the University of Pittsburgh.

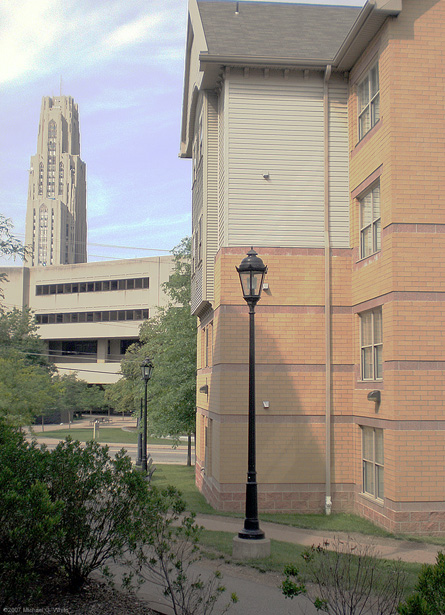
Posvar Hall and the Cathedral of Learning seen from Bouquet Gardents.

Bouquet Gardens is a major student residential complex of the University of Pittsburgh consisting of eight 4-story garden-style gabled-roofed apartment buildings (Buildings A through H) clustered around progression of courtyards connected by an interior pathway as well as a four-story apartment-style residence hall (Building J). Each gabled-roofed apartment-style building contains sixteen 4-bedroom apartments while the 155 bed Building J contains amenities for use by residents of the entire complex. Designed by Renaissance 3 Architects, P.C., the combined complex houses 651 upper-level undergraduate students in 172 units located on the lower campus close to Posvar Hall, the Barco Law Building, and adjacent to Sennott Square.

== History ==
The Bouquet Gardens complex sits on a property bounded by Oakland Avenue, South Bouquet and Sennott Streets which was acquired by the Pennsylvania General State Authority in 1967 by invoking eminent domain for the reasons of expediting Pitt's expansion following the university joining the Commonwealth System of Higher Education as a "state-related" institution in 1966. Additionally, the state declared that only academic buildings could be developed on the lot. For years, use and development of the land was disputed by the city and Oakland community, and as funding for the development lagged, some existing structures on the property were rented by the university to community groups. Following a renewed pledge of state funding by Governor Tom Ridge in the mid 1990s, university plans to for student housing and the south edge of campus were renewed.

Intended to architecturally blend the new south edge of campus into South Oakland, the original facades of the buildings were redesigned following community input in order better reflect the eclectic mix of brick and Victorian townhouses and low-rise apartment blocks of the mostly residential South Oakland neighborhood. The university also provided assistance in relocating community groups who had rented space on the property from the university as construction plans moved forward. Ground was broken on the first phase of the complex, which included 3 buildings, on December 1, 1998 and was completed and opened in the fall of 1999 for $5.3 million. The first phase of the construction represented the first new on-campus structures built in 7 years. The second phase added five buildings at a cost of $9.2 million and opened in the fall of 2000 bringing the total beds for the gabled-roofed apartment-style buildings to 496 in 124 units.

== Amenities ==
Each unit is air-conditioned, furnished, and includes four single bedrooms, a kitchen with refrigerator, stove and microwave, a living room and dining area, two bathrooms, and cable and internet connections.

== Building J expansion ==
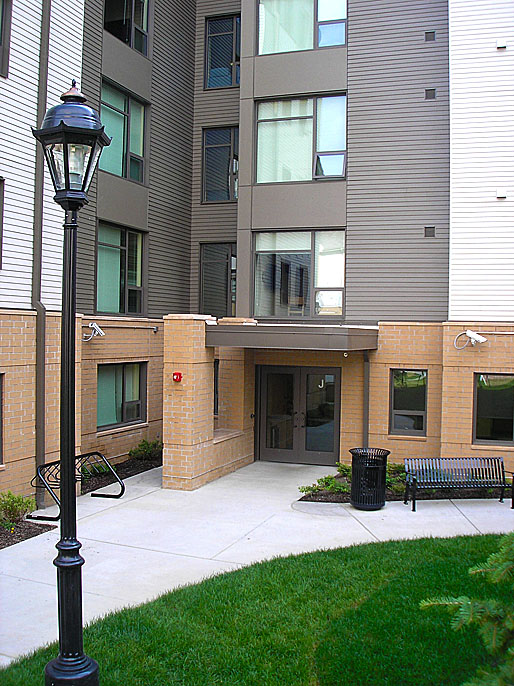
Entrance to Building J, the largest and newest addition to Bouquet Gardens

In November 2009, the university approved the purchase of a $1.4 million three-quarter-acre parcel of land contiguous to the existing Bouquet Gardens site for expansion of the housing complex. The project, designed by Perkins Eastman, paralleled the design of the garden-style Bouquet Gardens apartments and added a four-story, 64,800-square-foot (6,020 m^{2}) building. The building, which is designated as "Building J", has 155 beds in 48 three- and four-person apartment-style units. The residence hall opened for the fall semester of 2011, increasing the total number of the university's Pittsburgh campus beds to 7,396. The building also includes a resident director's apartment, a campus police substation, laundry and mail facilities, an indoor bicycle storage area, and a fitness room for Bouquet Gardens residents' use.

Preceded by Sutherland Hall	University of Pittsburgh buildings Bouquet Gardens; Constructed: 1999-2000	Succeeded by Sennott Square
