= Center for Latin American Studies – University of Pittsburgh =

National Resource Center on Latin America

Coordinates: 40.444167°N 79.953056°W

University of Pittsburgh Center for Latin American Studies
- Established: 1964
- Director: Scott Morgenstern
- Location: Pittsburgh, Pennsylvania, United States
- Campus: Oakland (Main)
- Website: http://www.ucis.pitt.edu/clas/

The University of Pittsburgh’s Center for Latin American Studies, commonly known as CLAS, is a National Resource Center on Latin America. The Center, founded in 1964 as part of the university's Center for International Studies, offers undergraduate and graduate students multidisciplinary training on Latin American and Caribbean studies.

== Mission ==
The Center for Latin American Studies states that its mission is to "expand and enrich academic resources relating to Latin America and the Caribbean at the University of Pittsburgh". It assists students in gaining expertise in Latin American and Caribbean affairs, and encourages the faculty to "pursue research, enhance their expertise, and disseminate new knowledge on the region". CLAS shares its resources with academic local, national, and international academic communities, public and private sector organizations, as well as the general public.

== Location ==
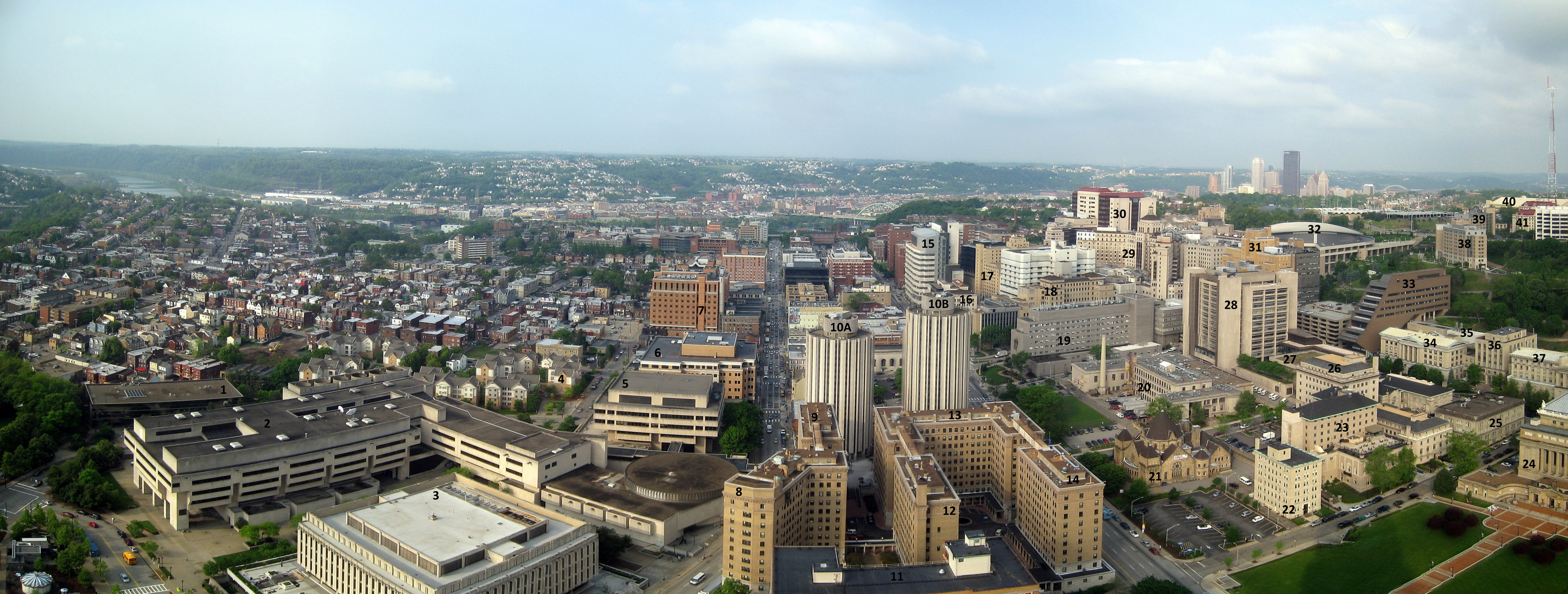
The Oakland neighborhood of Pittsburgh

CLAS is located on the University of Pittsburgh's main campus in the city's Oakland neighborhood. CLAS's offices are found in the Center for International Studies on the 4th floor of Wesley Posvar Hall, Pitt's largest academic building. Posvar Hall stands along Schenley Drive between Forbes Avenue and Roberto Clemente Drive. The center is located on the former site of Forbes Field where the Pittsburgh Pirates played from 1909 to 1970 and won multiple World Series.

== History ==
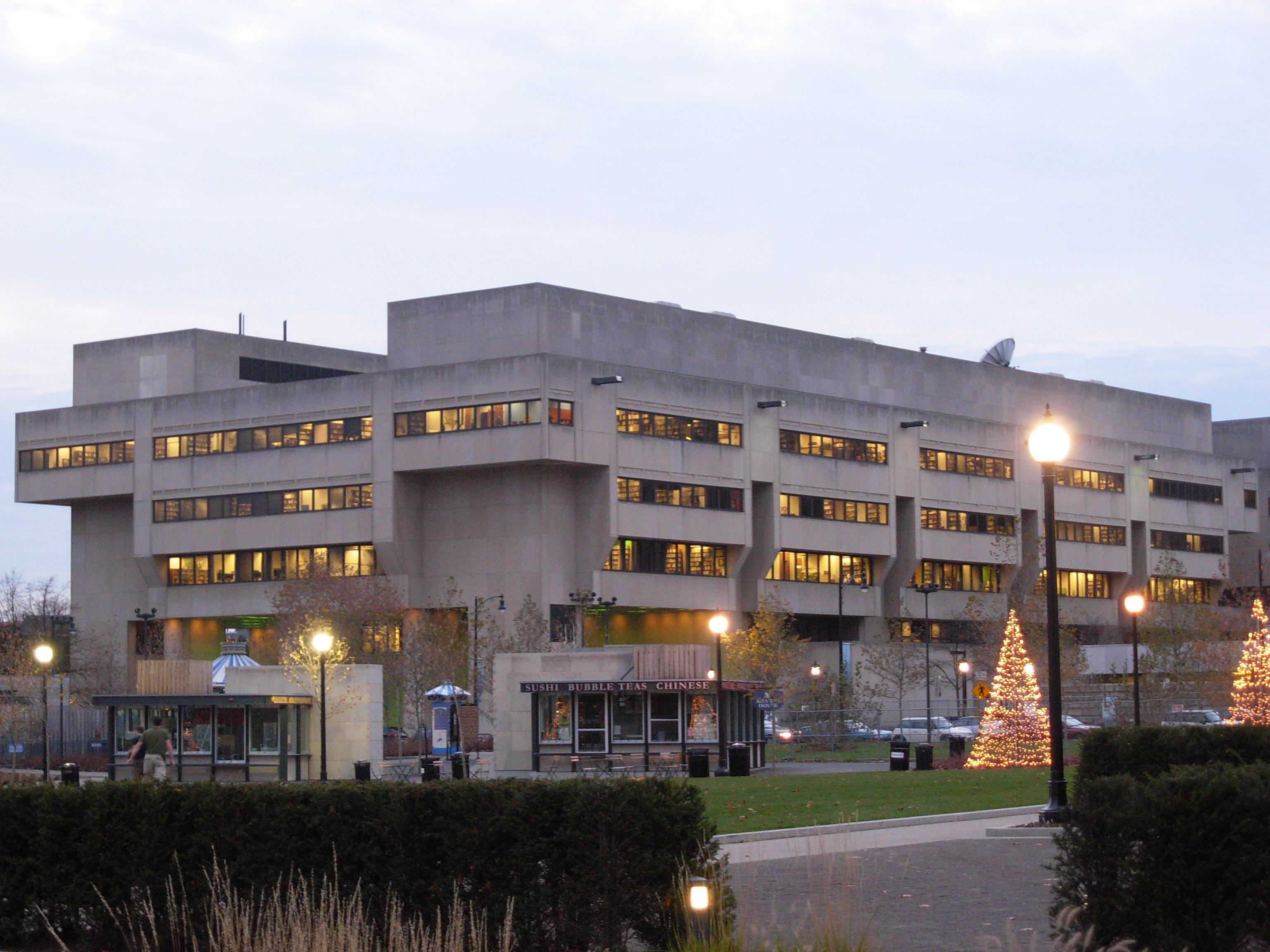
Posvar Hall is the primary location of CLAS

The center was formally founded on September 16, 1964, during Chancellor Edward H. Litchfield’s tenure at the University. Realizing the globalizing effect of World War II and witnessing the city of Pittsburgh’s role in global affairs, the Pitt administration became dedicated to transitioning from a University serving primarily Pennsylvania to one with a more global impact. Litchfield’s goal for the Center was to strengthen the University’s “International Dimension,” particularly with regard to Latin America. Litchfield cited Latin America's “important economic, social and political ties with the United States” in advocating for the establishment of a Center. With a five-year, $1.5 million grant from the Ford Foundation awarded in 1964, Litchfield hired political scientist Cole Blasier to direct the founding of the center.

Blasier worked in conjunction with the university's history, political science and sociology departments to form CLAS. The original coalition of these three distinct departments provided the lasting example of interdisciplinary cooperation that defines the Center today. Each semester, over 120 Pitt professors in over 20 different departments teach more than 250 courses on Latin America and the Caribbean.

Economist Carmelo Mesa-Lago became the center's second director in 1977, and while under his direction CLAS was officially designated a National Resource Center in Latin American Studies in 1979. The designation provided further funding and national recognition for CLAS. CLAS has been continuously funded by the US Department of Education as a National Resource Center since 1979. Following Mesa-Lago, other directors were Mitchell Seligson, William Dewalt, Kathleen Musante, Scott Morgenstern.

== Eduardo Lozano Latin American Library Collection ==
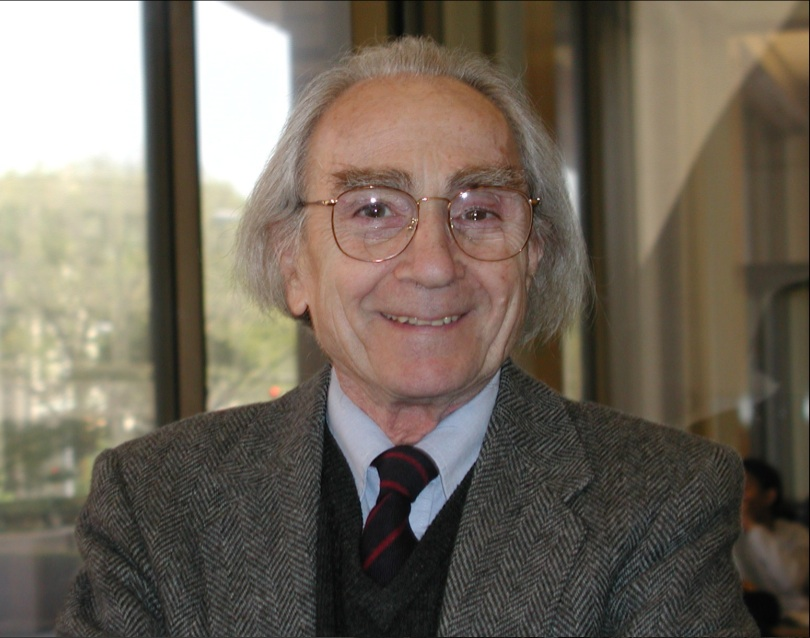
Eduardo Lozano, founder and director of the Latin American Library Collection

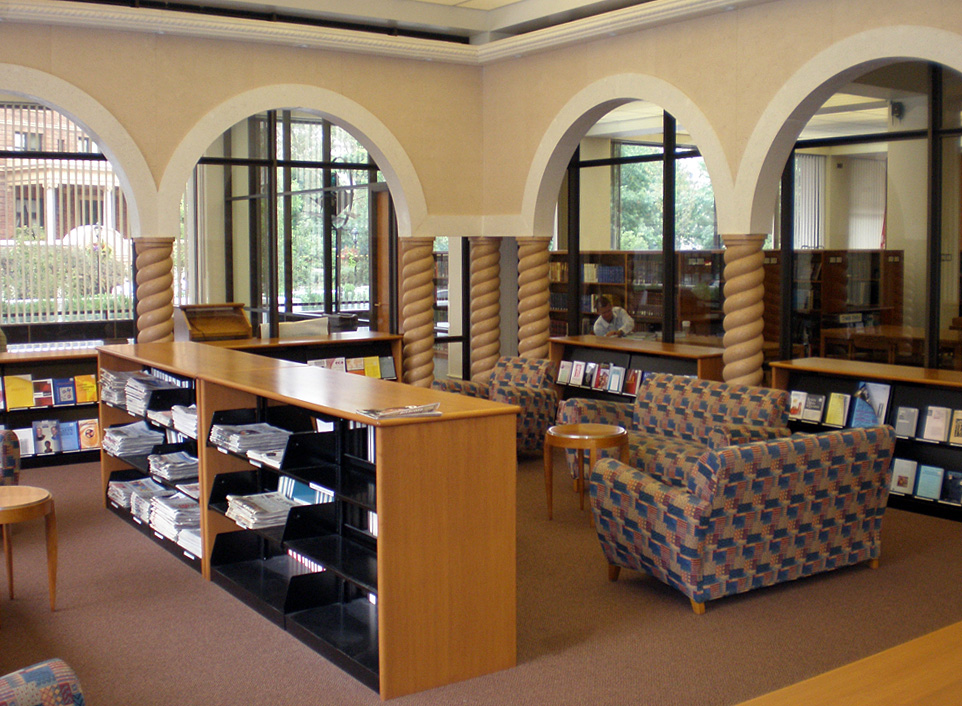
The Collection's Latin American Reading Room in Hillman Library

The collection was created and primarily built by Eduardo Lozano, a librarian, artist, poet, and author from Argentina who directed the Latin American Library from its creation until his death in 2006. Needing an organized resource center for CLAS, and with the help of Henry Hillman’s donation to the University for the new Hillman Library, Cole Blasier hired Lozano to establish a Latin American library collection in 1967. Lozano traveled annually throughout Latin America to buy books directly from the source.

The collection was officially named the "Eduardo Lozano Latin American Library Collection" by the university in 1997 and today is the eighth largest collection of Latin American resource materials in the United States and includes over 500,000 volumes, 12,000 periodical titles, 110,000 reels of microfilms, 540 films and video recordings, and 630 sound recordings. More than 85% of the volumes are in Spanish or Portuguese and the collection's resources on Bolivia and Cuba are considered some of the world's best. Over 400 libraries, research centers, universities, and governmental departments based in various locations around the world maintain exchange agreements with the collection. In 2002, a Latin American inspired reading room, housing a portion of the Lozano Collection, was dedicated in the university's Hillman Library. Composed of arches and columns with windows on three sides, the room was designed by Peruvian-American architect Victor Beltran to be reminiscent of a Spanish courtyard.

== Undergraduate and graduate programs ==
Since 1968, CLAS has offered undergraduate students a program in Latin American studies. Students work towards receiving a certificate in Latin American studies in conjunction with their bachelor's degree. Graduates of the program therefore obtain interdisciplinary knowledge and field study in the Latin American region. These graduates have become administrators in the United Nations, state and federal government officials, Peace Corps and Catholic relief service volunteers, foreign service officers in Argentina, Brazil, and other countries, Spanish teachers, and many other professionals in a variety of fields.

The graduate program at CLAS is aimed at doctoral or master's students who want to incorporate a specialization in Latin America into their studies. Candidates for the graduate certificate must be proficient in Spanish, Portuguese, or an Amerindian language. Currently, four semesters of Quechua are offered to fulfill the Amerindian language requirement. Two courses in the student's major department and four courses in at least two departments outside are required for completion of the program, as is an interdisciplinary research paper in the field of Latin American studies.

== CLAS educational and public service outreach ==
As a National Resource Center on Latin America, the Outreach Program at CLAS plays a leading role in sharing information and resources on Latin American studies to educators of all academic levels and disciplines. CLAS' Outreach Program offers educational expertise from college level educators to kindergarten through secondary classes. In addition, CLAS seeks to provide resources to the professional community and the general public as part of its educational public service outreach mission. Outreach programs are offered throughout the academic year and include professional development workshops, study abroad opportunities, faculty development seminars, summer research fellowships, curriculum development projects, school visit programs, a resource lending library, and lecture and film series. The center also published two in-house newsletters, CLASicos and Las Noticias, and in concert with the University of Pittsburgh Press, its faculty and staff are often involved in helping to produce scholarly publications and journals covering a range of Latin American topics. In addition, the center also hosts the website Panoramas which provides an on-line venue for a dialogue and academic discussion of Latin American and Caribbean issues. Since 1980, CLAS has also hosted an annual Latin American and Caribbean Festival.
