= Dietrich School of Arts and Sciences =

Constituent school of the University of Pittsburgh

Coordinates: 40.4443°N 79.9572°W

Kenneth P. Dietrich School of Arts and Sciences
- Type: College of Arts and Sciences
- Established: 1787
- Parent institution: University of Pittsburgh
- Dean: Adam Leibovich
- Faculty: 1,012
- Undergraduates: 10,328
- Postgraduates: 1,511
- Website: www.as.pitt.edu

The Kenneth P. Dietrich School of Arts and Sciences (Dietrich School or School of Arts and Sciences) is one of the 17 schools and colleges of University of Pittsburgh in Pittsburgh, Pennsylvania. A direct descendant of the 1787-chartered Pittsburgh Academy, and the oldest part of the university, the school serves as "the liberal arts core" of the university; some 30 departments and programs provide instruction in natural sciences, humanities, and social sciences to all students at the Pittsburgh campus in Oakland. The school is the largest graduate school in the Pittsburgh area.

== History ==
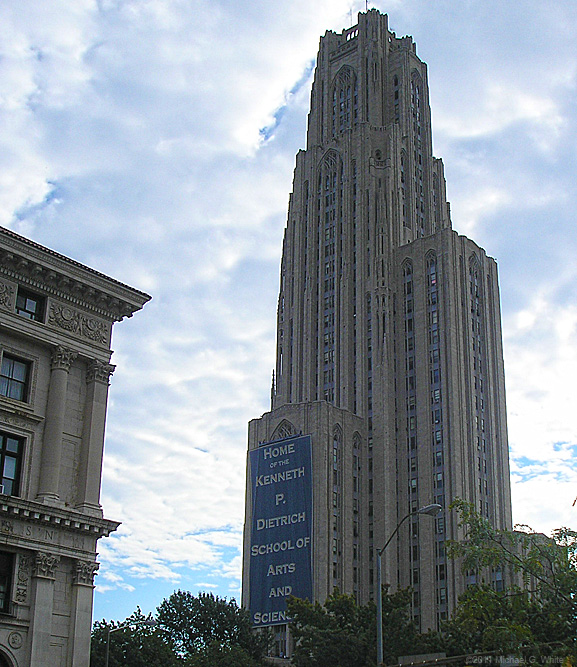
The Cathedral of Learning at the University of Pittsburgh, the primary home of the School of Arts and Sciences. In September 2011, a large banner was hung from the Cathedral's 16th to 5th floor announcing the name change for the school.

Founded by Hugh Henry Brackenridge as the Pittsburgh Academy and chartered in 1787, the School of Arts and Sciences may have originally grown out of a school that was active before the charter was granted, perhaps as early as 1770. Thus the SAS began its life as a preparatory school, presumably in a log cabin, in what is now downtown Pittsburgh, which was then on the frontier of the United States. The school was established on the principles of teaching the rudiments of the "sacred six" of the Scottish universities, as Brackenridge was himself Scottish. Within a short period, more advanced education in the area was needed, so in 1819 the Commonwealth of Pennsylvania amended the school's 1787 charter to confer university status. The school took the name the Western University of Pennsylvania.

By the 1830s, the school faced severe financial pressure to abandon its traditional liberal education in favor of the state legislature's desire for it to provide more vocational training. The decision to remain committed to liberal education nearly ended the university, but it persevered despite its abandonment by the city and state. Similar pressure to abandon the liberal arts focus of the school occurred again between 1902 and 1908 when industrial development in the region was attracting more students to technical trades. Financial pressure mounted to abandon the traditional liberal arts curriculum and focus on more vocational training, but petitions from students, alumni, faculty and some trustees kept the original mission intact.

Out of the school, which by then was often referred to as "the College", came the genesis for some of the university's other schools, such as the School of Engineering and School of Law. Both continued to require the traditional classical studies for a bachelor's degree, but they began to formally separate around the time when the university moved to its new location in the Oakland neighborhood of Pittsburgh, when it also changed its name to the University of Pittsburgh in 1908. With the formal separation from the school of engineering, the school became known as the College of Liberal Arts and Sciences.

Several of the school's departments, like mathematics and chemistry, have an unbroken line of professors from the Pittsburgh Academy. Courses such as astronomy, chemistry, English, mathematics, modern languages, and classics, are essentially descended from the academy and resemble the course listings of the day.

In the summer of 2006, the School of Arts and Sciences began to oversee the administration of the University’s College of General Studies, expanding the community of Arts and Sciences learners to include nontraditional students. On September 22, 2011, it was announced that an alumnus of the school's Department of Political Science, William S. Dietrich II, had donated $125 million to the university, the largest ever donation to the university up until that time, and that the university would rename the School of Arts and Sciences to honor his father, Kenneth. Since July 2023, Adam K. Leibovich has served as the school's Bettye J. and Ralph E. Bailey Dean. The position is named after a couple that donated $3 million to the school in November 2007 using profits from high-ranking positions with Consol Energy, Conoco, and Fuel Tech, as Bettye had graduated from Pitt's College of General Studies with a BA in 1984.

== Academics ==
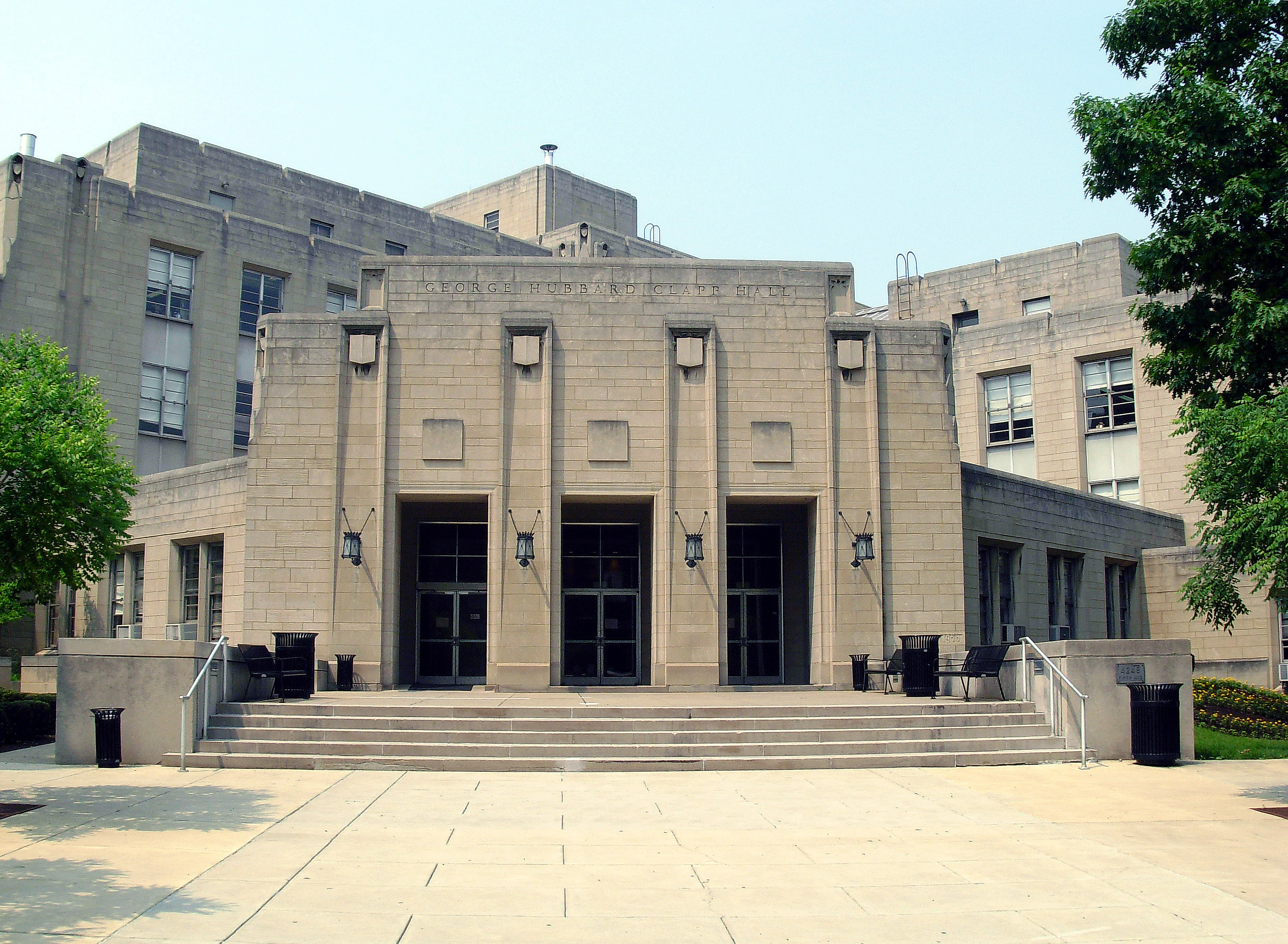
Entrance to Clapp Hall, part of the Clapp/Langley/Crawford Complex that houses the school's Department of Biological Sciences and Department of Neuroscience

The School of Arts and Sciences graduate programs offer MA, MS, MFA, and PhD programs in 34 concentrations, as well as a wide range of interdisciplinary programs.

=== Undergraduate majors ===
- A&S/Business Dual Major
- Actuarial Mathematics
- Africana Studies*
- Africana Studies–English
- Anthropology
- Applied Mathematics
- Architectural Studies
- Bioinformatics
- Biological Sciences
- Chemistry*
- Chinese*
- Classics*
- Communication: Rhet & Comm
- Computer Science*
- Ecology and Evolution
- Economics*
- Economics–Statistics
- English Literature*
- English Writing
- Environmental Geology
- Environmental Studies
- Film Studies*
- French*
- Geology
- Gender, Sexuality, and Women's Studies*
- German*
- History*
- History and Philosophy of Science
- History of Art and Architecture
- International and Area Studies
- Italian Language and Literature*
- Italian Studies*
- Japanese*
- Korean* (minor only)
- Linguistics*
- Mathematics*
- Mathematics-Economics
- Mathematics-Philosophy
- Microbiology
- Molecular Biology
- Music*
- Neuroscience*
- Philosophy*
- Physics* and Astronomy
- Political Science*
- Politics-Philosophy
- Psychology
- Religious Studies*
- Russian (and Slovak Studies minor)
- Scientific Computing
- Slavic Studies
- Sociology*
- Spanish (and Portuguese minor)
- Statistics*
- Studio Arts*
- Theatre Arts*
- Urban Studies

*also available as a minor

==== Undergraduate certificate programs ====
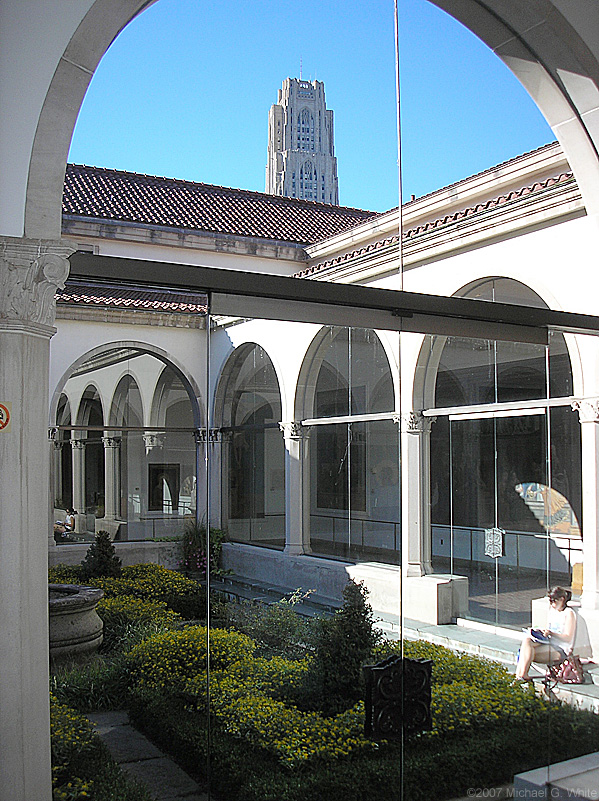
The Nicholas Lochoff Cloister of the Frick Fine Arts Building, home to the school's Department of Studio Arts and Architectural Studies Program

Certificate programs allow students to complete a concentrated area of study in addition to their major. Certificates typically require 18-24 credits, are noted the student's transcript upon graduation.

- American Sign Language
- Children's Literature
- Conceptual Foundations of Medicine
- Geographic Information Systems
- German Language
- Historic Preservation
- Jewish Studies
- Leadership Certificate
- Medieval and Renaissance Studies
- Photonics
- Public & Professional Writing
- Gender, Sexuality and Women’s Studies

Certificates can also be obtained from the University Center for International Studies.

- African Studies
- Asian Studies
- European Union Studies
- Global Studies
- Latin American Studies
- Russian & East European Studies
- West European Studies

=== Graduate departments and programs ===
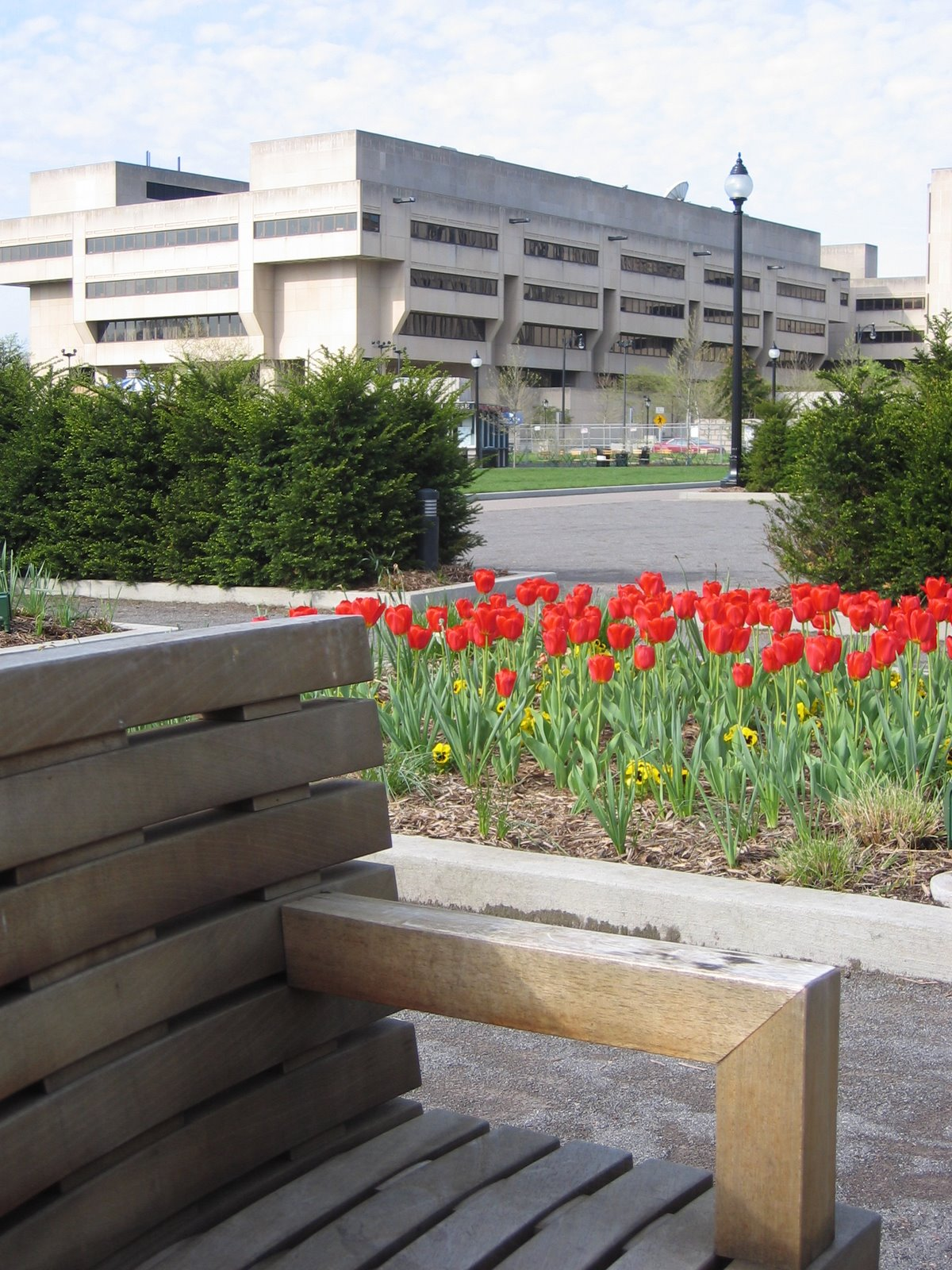
Wesley W. Posvar Hall

- Anthropology
- Bioethics
- Biological Sciences
- Critical European Culture Studies
- Chemistry
- Classics, Philosophy, and Ancient Science
- Communication
- Computational Biology
- East Asian Languages and Literatures
- Economics
- English
- French and Italian Languages and Literatures
- Geology and Planetary Science
- Hispanic Languages and Literatures
- Hispanic Linguistics
- History
- History of Art and Architecture
- History and Philosophy of Science
- Integrative Molecular Biology
- Linguistics
- Mathematics
- Molecular Biophysics
- Music
- Center for Neuroscience
- Philosophy
- Physics and Astronomy
- Political Science
- Psychology
- Slavic Languages and Literatures
- Sociology
- Statistics
- Theatre Arts

==== Graduate certificate-granting programs ====
- African Studies
- Asian Studies
- Composition, Literacy, and Pedagogy
- Cultural Studies
- European Studies
- Film and Media Studies
- Latin American Studies
- Medieval and Renaissance Studies
- Russian and East European Studies
- TESOL
- Women, Gender & Sexuality Studies

== Rankings ==
Many of the programs offered within the School of Arts and Sciences are considered among the best in the nation. For instance, the Department of Philosophy, is considered one of the top five in the United States, and the Department of History and Philosophy of Science, consistently ranked at the top of the field.

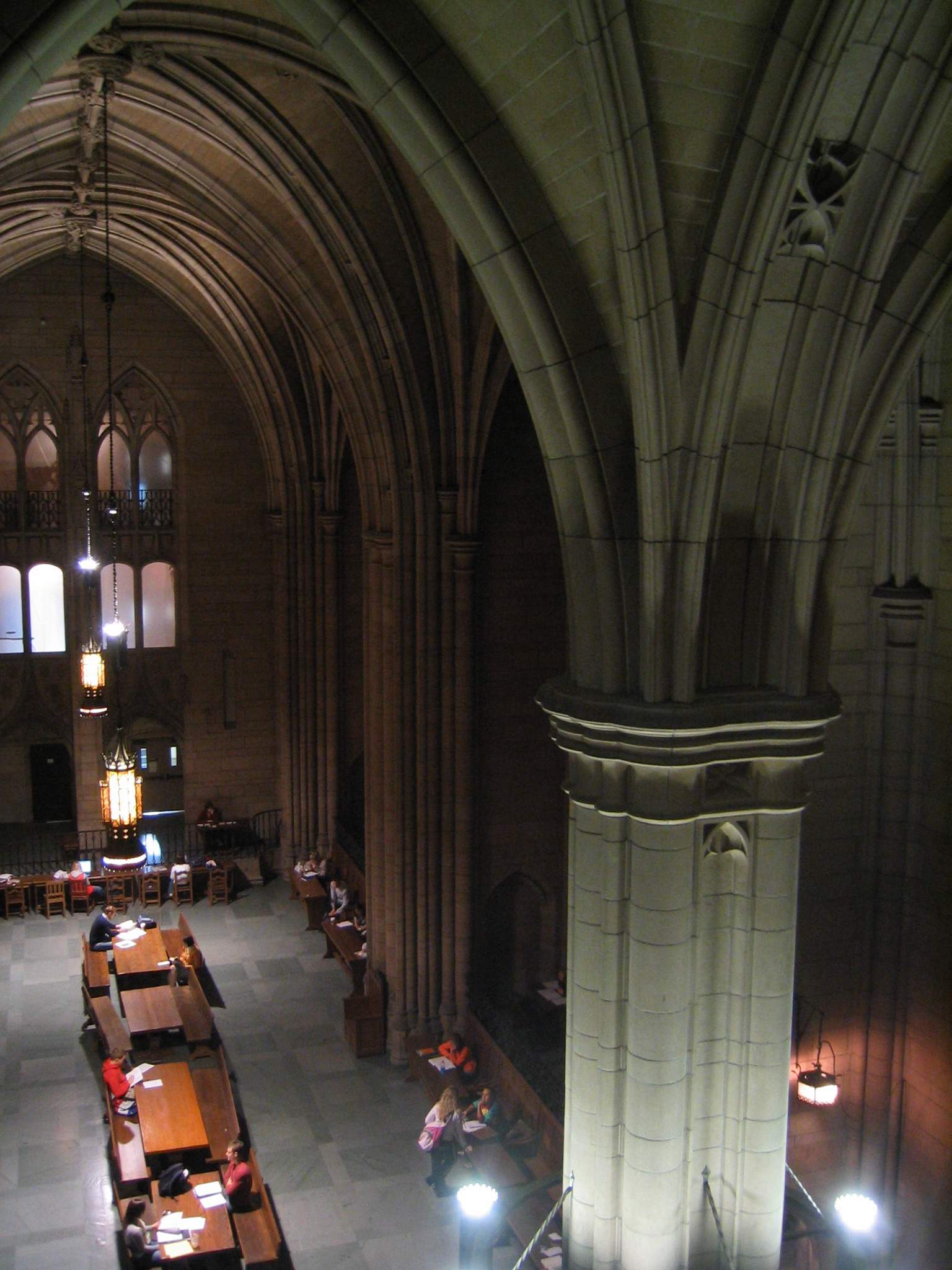
Commons Room in the Cathedral of Learning

Other rankings, including those by the National Research Council and U.S. News & World Report, include the following programs among the best in the nation:

- Philosophy #2*
- Art History #22*
- Linguistics #23*
- Anthropology #25*
- Spanish #26*
- English #27*, #35^{^}
- German #30*
- Religion #33*
- Statistics/Biostats #33*
- Psychology #36^{^}, #48*
- History #44
- Political Science #31*, #39^{^}
- Economics #34*, #39^{^}
- Chemistry #34*, #43^{^}
- Neuroscience #39*
- Physics #39*
- French #40*
- Music #40*
- Pharmacology #42*
- Molecular & General Genetics #46*
- Physiology #47*
- Computer Science #43*, #48^{^}
- Physics #48^{^}
- Sociology #54^{^}, #59*
- Math #57*, #58^{^}
- Biological sciences #58^{^}
- Cell Biology #65*
- Geosciences #72*
- Biochemistry/Molecular Biology #87*
- Ecology/Evolution/Behavior #89*

*National Research Council
^{^} US News & World Report America's Best Graduate Programs
