= Sennott Square =

Coordinates: 40°26′29″N 79°57′23″W

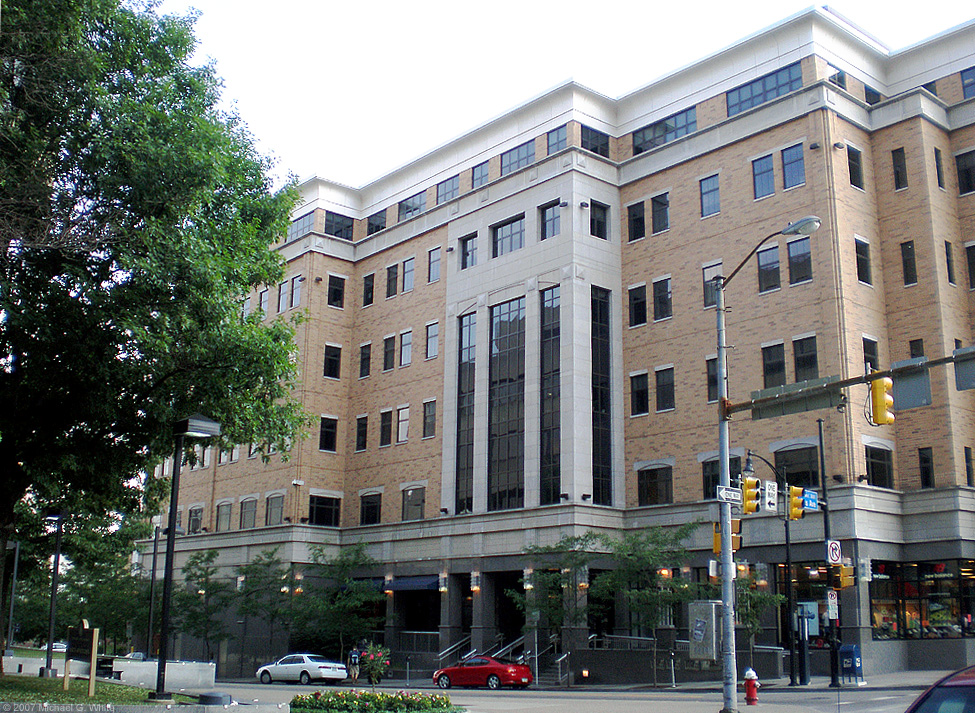
- Sennott Square at the University of Pittsburgh
- Interactive map of the Sennott Square area
- Former names: Multi-Purpose Academic Complex (MPAC)

General information
- Type: Academic
- Location: Pittsburgh, PA
- Current tenants: College of Business Administration; Department of Psychology; Department of Computer Science; School of Law Civil Practice Clinic; Ground floor retail including Panera Bread
- Construction started: January, 2000
- Inaugurated: September 5, 2002
- Cost: $35 million
- Client: University of Pittsburgh
- Owner: University of Pittsburgh

Technical details
- Floor count: 6
- Floor area: 248,000 square feet (23,000 m^{2}) (gross); 117,000 square feet (10,900 m^{2}) (functional)

Design and construction
- Architecture firm: JSA

Sennott Square is a major academic building on the campus of the University of Pittsburgh in Pittsburgh, Pennsylvania, United States. The building designed by the architectural firm JSA was dedicated on September 5, 2002, and was the largest Pitt academic building constructed since 1978. The six-story, 248,000 gross-square-foot facility cost approximately $35 million and occupies a city block and is bounded by Sennott and Bouquet streets and Forbes and Oakland avenues. It combines classroom and office space with retail space on the ground floor facing Forbes and Oakland Avenues.

The second floor of the building is dedicated to the College of Business Administration, Pitt’s undergraduate business college. Floors three and four are used by the Department of Psychology, while the fifth houses the University of Pittsburgh School of Computing and Information's Department of Computer Science, the Intelligent Systems Program, and the School of Law's Civil Practice Clinic. The sixth floor houses the Computer Science department exclusively. The building has nine classrooms and two large seminar rooms, including a $400,000 Eli Lilly videoconferencing lab. The first floor is committed to retail space, currently including a Panera Bread and a Rue 21. The facility has 72 short-term parking spaces underground and 18 metered street-level parking spaces.

From a foundation that incorporates more than one million pounds of reinforcing rods and 575 truckloads of concrete, Sennott Square rises six floors above street level to provide more than 117,000 square feet (10,900 m^{2}) of functional space. The first floor contains nearly 17,000 square feet (1,600 m^{2}) of retail shops with access from Forbes Avenue. On Sennott Street, two parklets with benches and ornamental shade trees provide places to relax.

The University of Pittsburgh's first building incorporating "green" construction techniques throughout, Sennott Square is environmentally friendly and energy efficient. All carpeting was made from recycled materials, and built-in recycling bins have been installed on every floor. In addition, the building employs computer-based lighting, temperature controls, and other systems to maximize energy efficiency.

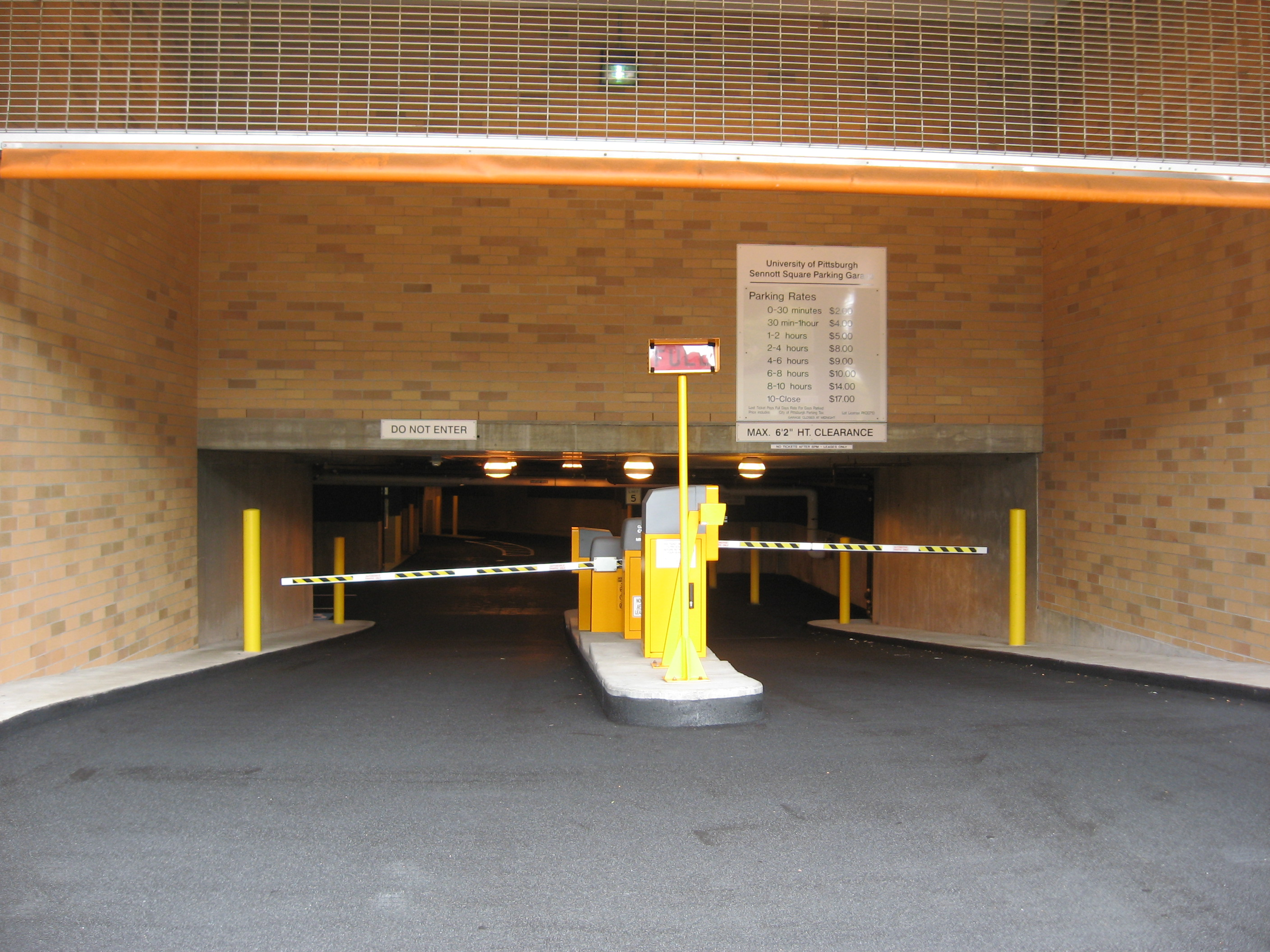
The entrance to the underground parking garage at Sennott Square

Preceded by Bouquet Gardens	University of Pittsburgh buildings Sennott Square; Constructed: 2002	Succeeded by Petersen Events Center
