= University of Pittsburgh Center for International Studies =

Education

- Parent institution: University of Pittsburgh
- Established: 1968
- Website: www.ucis.pitt.edu/main/

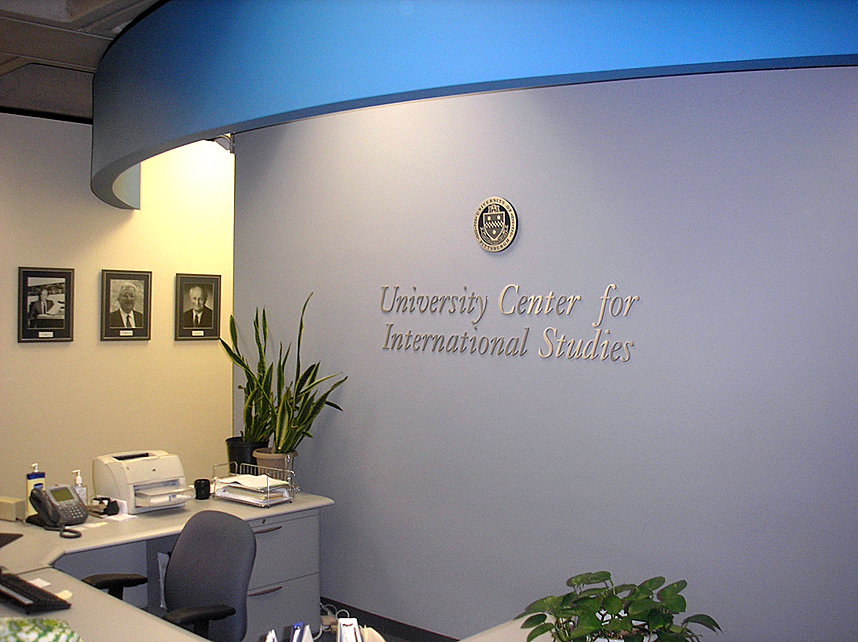
UCIS's office in Posvar Hall

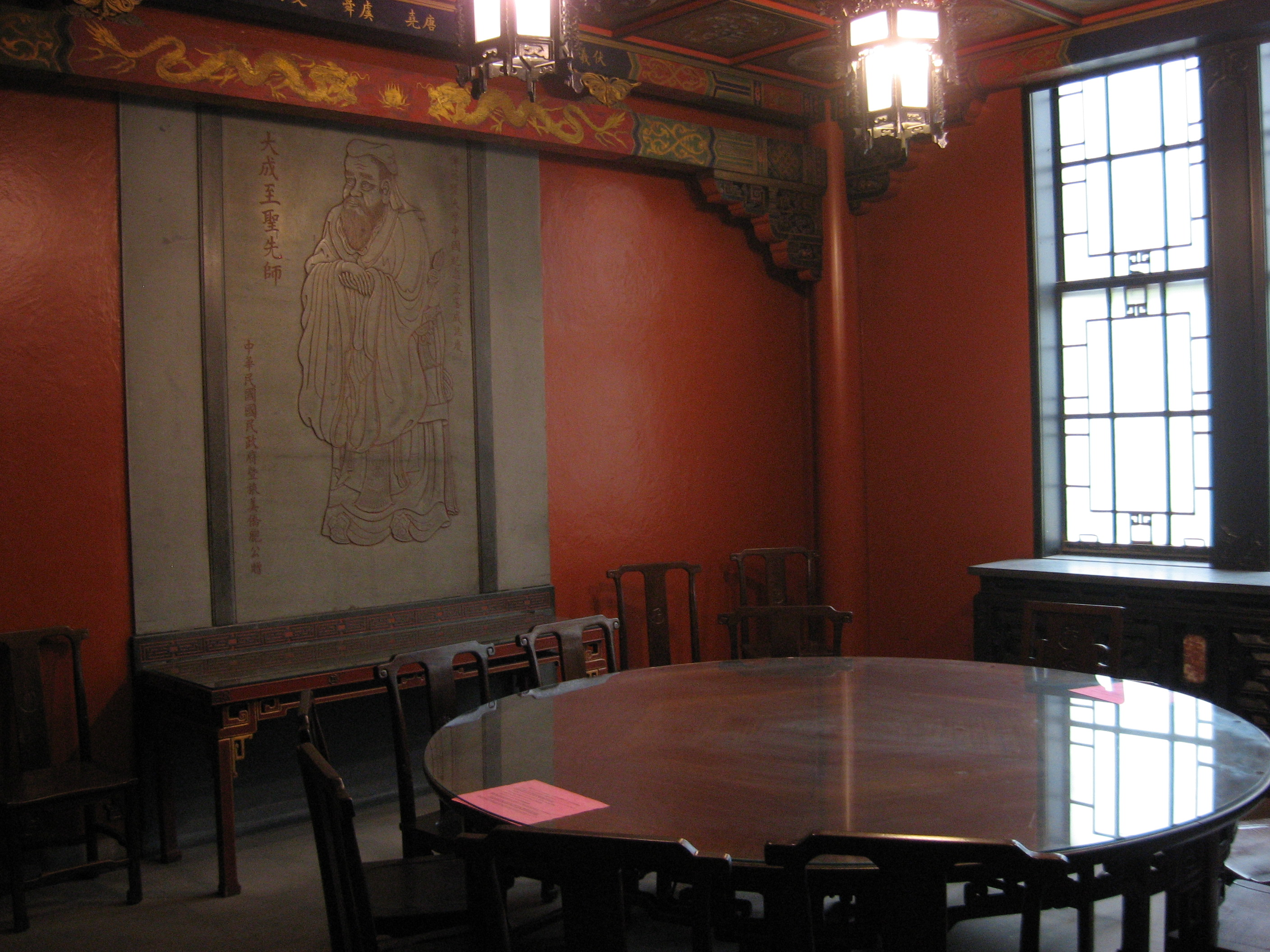
UCIS oversees the Nationality Room and Intercultural Exchange Scholarship Program

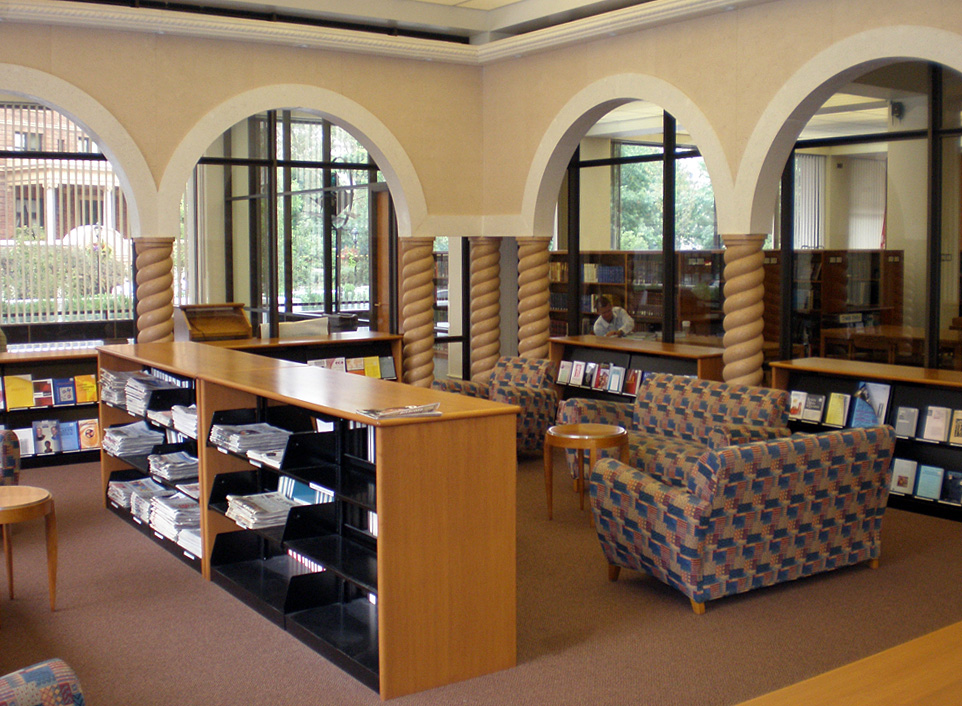
The Eduardo Lozano Latin American Collection is housed in Latin American Reading Room in Hillman Library

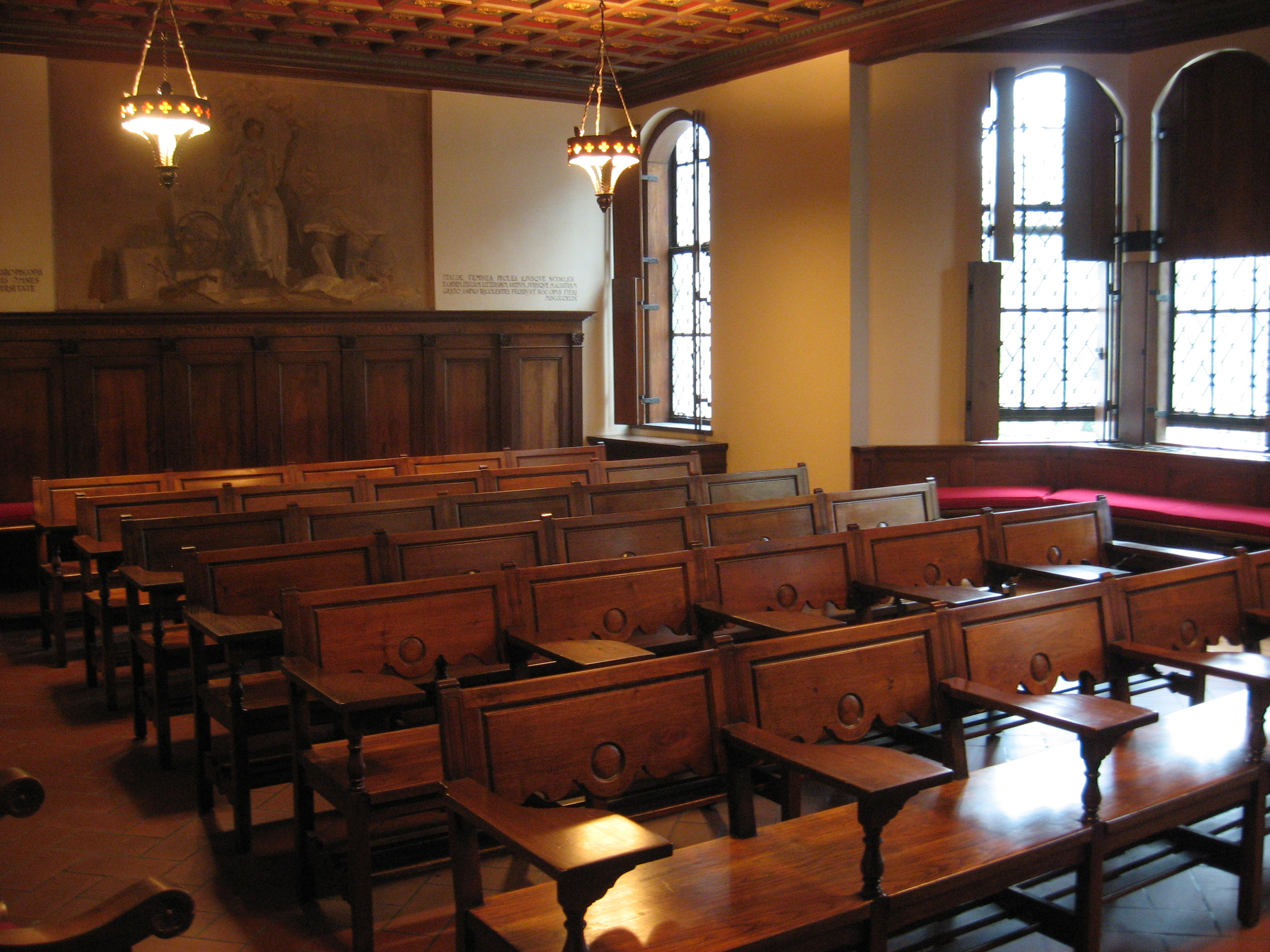
The Italian Nationality Classroom

University Center for International Studies (UCIS), the first center of its kind when created in 1968, provides a university-wide integration of international scholarship at the University of Pittsburgh. This center provides a university-wide framework for students, faculty, other scholars who have an interest in international studies. UCIS encompasses centers for area studies and centers on topical specializations in international studies. It coordinates international education curricula and provides support services such as the Study Abroad Program, which helps students study abroad during their college experience. It does not offer degrees but awards certificates of attainment to degree candidates in the university's schools. Carl Beck served as the first director of the UCIS.

== Centers ==
UCIS also coordinates centers for area studies and centers on topical specializations in international studies. Within UCIS, there are six component studies centers have been competitively designated National Resource Centers by the United States Department of Education making the university one of only 17 to claim four or more study programs designated as such. These National Resource designated centers include the East Asian component of the Asian Studies Center, Center for Latin American Studies, Center for Russian and East European Studies, European Studies Center, the Global Studies Program, and the International Business Center. In addition, with the help of UCIS coordination, the University of Pittsburgh has received 115 grants funded through the U.S. Department of Education, the 14th most out of the 594 institutions of higher education receiving such International Education Programs Service grants.

In addition, Pitt's Asian Studies Center was awarded the first Confucius Institute in Pennsylvania by the Chinese Ministry of Education. Pitt's Confucius Institute has been named the Confucius Institute of the Year twice since 2007, including in 2011 when it was one of only 30 such designates worldwide, and one of only five in the United States. and has been named as one of six national sites of the National Consortium for Teaching about Asia (NCTA). Also, Pitt is home to one of just ten European Union Centers of Excellence in the U.S., funded by the European Commission.

== Study abroad ==
UCIS offers multiple programs for studying abroad. Several traditional two-way exchange programs, which allow students to pay the normal Pitt tuition, have been instituted between Pitt and multiple universities including those in Hong Kong, England, France, Japan, Mexico, South Korea, and Wales. In addition, special exchange programs for students in the College of Business Administration and Swanson School of Engineering have been set up in France, Germany, Spain, and Uruguay.

Additional opportunities to study abroad also exist in Honors College Field Study in Mongolia; Mid-Term Break study in Paris and Rome; departmental programs in Turkey, Indian, Latin America, Spain, and Germany; Summer Language Institute programs in Sofia, Poland, Moscow, Slovakia, and Zagreb/Sarajevo/Belgrade. of other countries including Israel, Poland, and Russia.

UCIS also offers "Panther Programs" developed from various departments and schools within the University of Pittsburgh in which students are accompanied by a Pitt faculty member to teach one or more of their regularly taught courses abroad during regular semesters or the summer. Programs include "Pitt in" China, Cuba, Ecuador, Ghana, Greece, India, Italy, London, Spain, Tanzania, France, Czech Republic and Poland, and Austria and Croatia. Additionally, the Pitt MAP, or Multi-region Academic Program, is a semester-long globally comparative and academically rigorous study abroad experience in which multiple Pitt faculty and students will travel together to three sites, each on a different continent, taking courses designed to address one to the six Global Studies concentration themes.

Also offered is Plus3, a three-credit, two-week optional add-on to CBA's required Managing Complex Environments course and Engineering's ENG 12 course. The program is an international research project held immediately after the end of spring term and is targeted to students between their freshman and sophomore years. The program was awarded the Andrew Heiskell Award for Innovation in International Education by the Institute for International Education.
