= University of Pittsburgh College of General Studies =

- Type: State-related
- Established: 1932
- Dean: Adam Leibovich
- Faculty: 14
- Undergraduates: 750
- Location: Pittsburgh, Pennsylvania, USA
- Campus: Oakland (Main)
- Website: https://www.cgs.pitt.edu/

The College of General Studies (CGS) is one of the 17 schools within the University of Pittsburgh located in Pittsburgh, Pennsylvania. The College of General Studies offers programs of special interest to adults and non-traditional students, including baccalaureate degrees (BA/BS) and standalone certificates. The administration of the College of General Studies is overseen by the Kenneth P. Dietrich School of Arts and Sciences.

== History ==
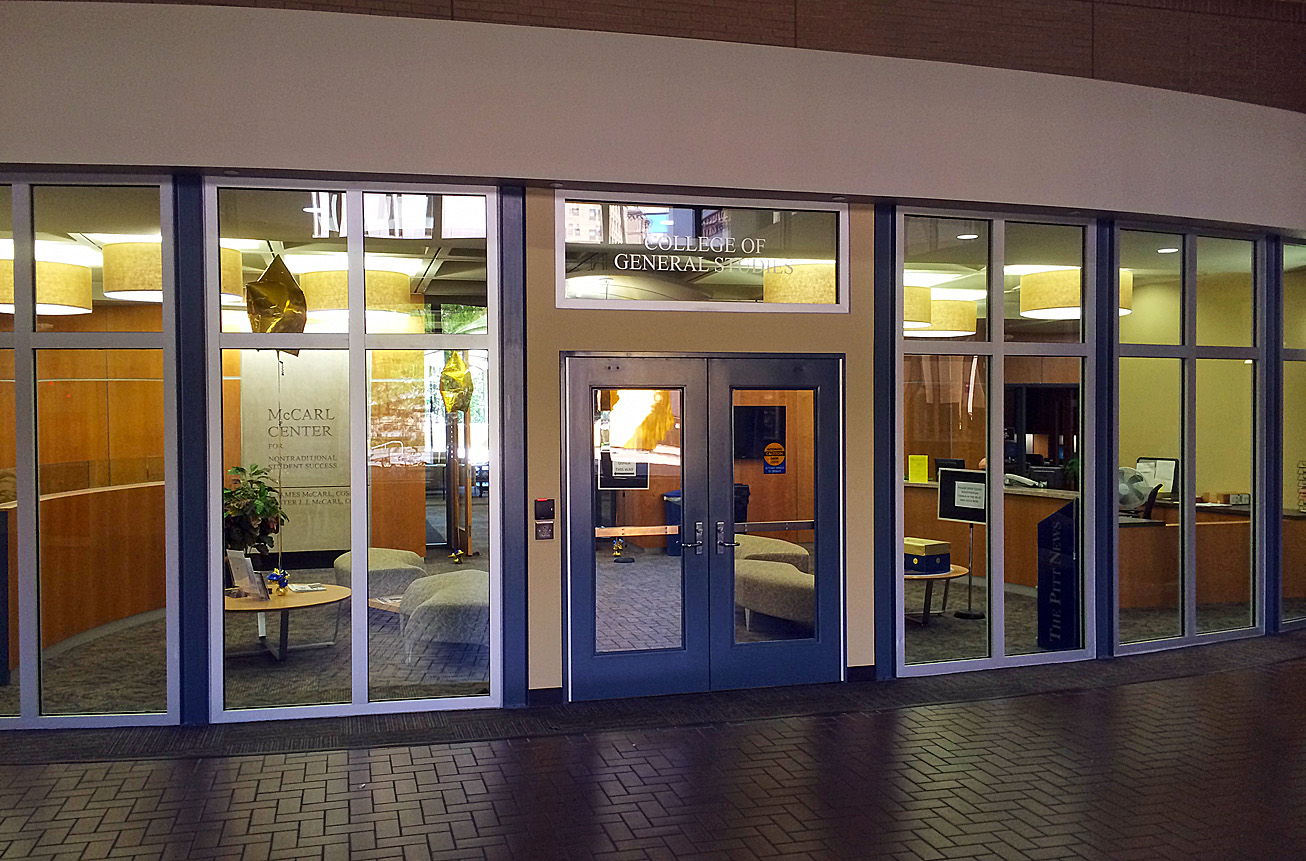
Home of the College of General Studies on the first floor of Posvar Hall

The College of General Studies evolved from the 1908 Downtown Division of the Pittsburgh Academy. It became the Department of Afternoon, Saturday and Evening Studies in 1911 when it moved from Downtown to Oakland and began offering a limited number of off-campus courses. By 1920, Pitt had expanded its off-campus offerings to 19 locations in western Pennsylvania and Ohio, including Erie and Youngstown. In 1932, Pitt established the University Extension Division, which became known informally as the evening program, with its director reporting directly to the chancellor. On March 11, 1958, the Pitt Board of Trustees, following a recommendation by then Chancellor Edward Litchfield, approved the establishment of the School of General Studies primarily as an alternative for adults wishing to continuing education. Enrollment in the School of General Studies peaked at 18,930 during the 1974–75 academic year, the vast majority of which were part-time students. In 1981, the School of General Studies was renamed the College of General Studies to reflect that its degree was comparable to an Arts and Sciences degree. In the early 1990s, the College of General Studies offered as many as 30 degree majors, which was downgraded to ten in 1998–99 in order to eliminate duplication with majors offered in other Pitt units. In 2002 the McCarl Center for Nontraditional Student Success open followed by a major restructuring of the College of General Studies in 2003. The Osher Lifelong Learning Institute, for those 50 years old and older, and CGSOnline was established in 2005.

=== Deans ===
- 1958–1971 Viers Wilson Adams
- 1971–1983 J. Steele Gow Jr.
- 1983–1994 John Bolvin
- 1994–1996 Robert Comfort (interim dean)
- 1996–1997 Robert Carter
- 1997–1999 Jack Daniel (interim dean)
- 1999–2006 Susan R. Kinsey
- 2006–2017 N. John Cooper
- 2017–2023 Kathleen Blee
- 2023-present Adam Leibovich

== McCarl Center for Nontraditional Student Success ==
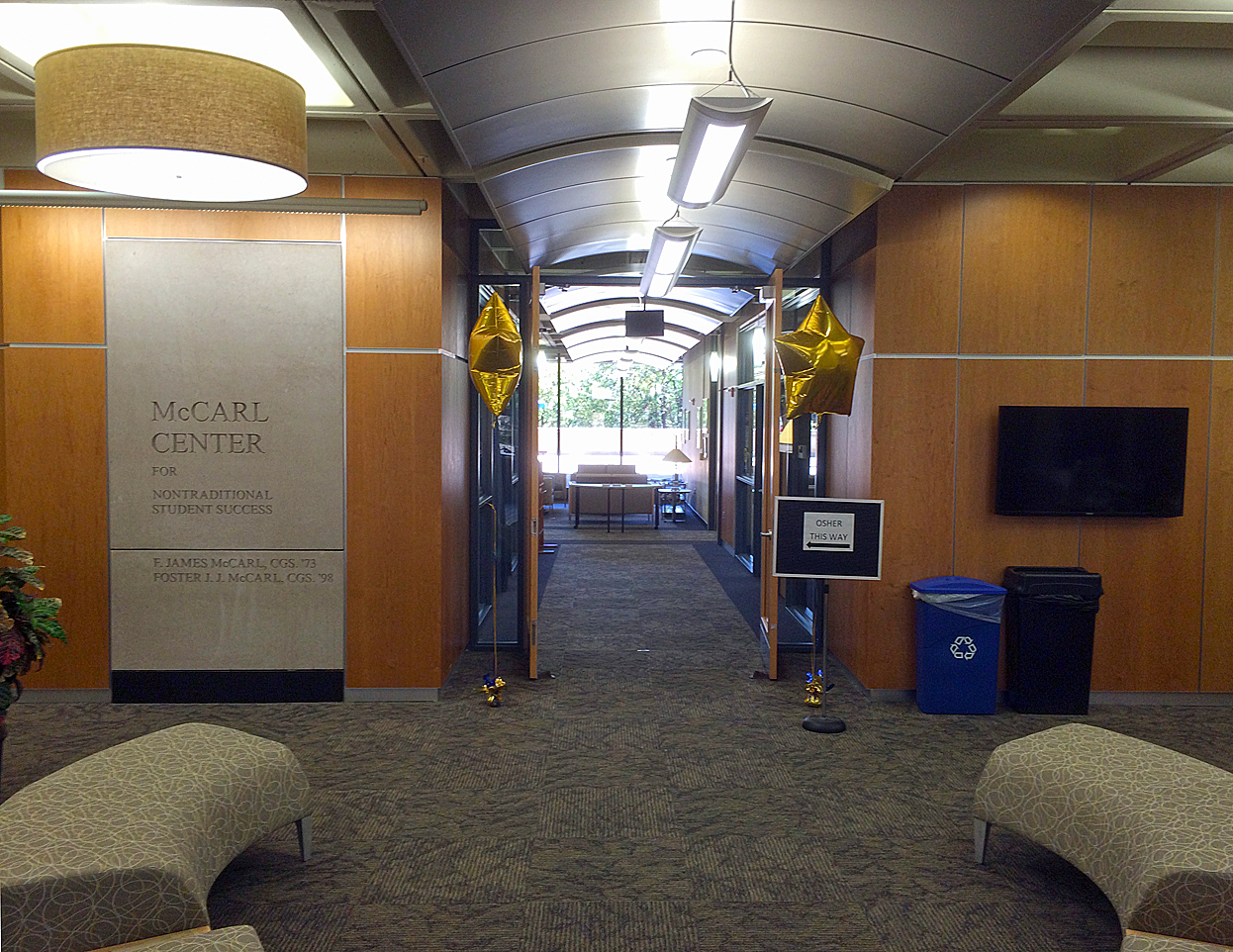
McCarl Center for Nontraditional Student Success in Posvar Hall

Originally located on the fourth floor of the Cathedral of Learning, the 2,500-square-foot (230 m^{2}) $537,000 McCarl Center was opened in 2002 and occupies space that once housed two levels of the main stacks of the university's library. Made possible by a gift from F. James and Foster J.J. McCarl, it serves as resource center for non-traditional students and hosts seminars and events. The space was designed by Alan J. Cueri and his architectural firm Strada, LLC, and includes wood finishes, double-height spaces with high ceilings and windows, a main corridor conceived as an interior street, and many elements that refer to the Cathedral of Learning's Gothic architecture including decorative painted metal columns with contemporary buttress-style arches. The center included a resource library, meeting rooms, and a student lounge, and is staffed with academic advisors and has contains a reception area for the College of General Studies. Three unsigned and undated 7 feet (2.1 m) by 3 feet (0.91 m) glass-encased murals that depict Renaissance painting styles and which have long belonged to the university but are of unknown origin hang in a hallway outside the center.

The College of General Studies, including the McCarl Center, the Office of Veterans Services, and the Osher Lifelong Learning Institute, relocated from the Cathedral of Learning to the first floor of Posvar Hall in May, 2014.

== Degrees programs ==
Majors offered through the College of General Studies

- Administration of Justice (BA)
- Dental Hygiene (BS)
- Health Services (BA)
- Health Services (BS)
- Humanities (BA)
- Law, Criminal Justice, and Society (BA)
- Legal Studies (BA)
- Liberal Studies (BA)
- Media and Professional Communications (BA)
- Natural Sciences (BS)
- Public Service (BA)
- Social Sciences (BA)

In addition to these interdisciplinary and flexible bachelor's degree programs, the College of General Studies also offers non-degree admission for students who wish to take individual undergraduate Pitt courses for credit or enroll in a CGS standalone undergraduate certificate. A post-baccalaureate certificate in Accounting is available through CGS in partnership with the College of Business Administration.

The College of General Studies offers over 100 courses across its disciplines through web based instruction.
