= University of Pittsburgh College of Business Administration =

Undergraduate business school of the University of Pittsburgh

Coordinates: 40°26′29″N 79°57′23″W

- Type: Public
- Established: 1907
- Dean: Gene Anderson
- Faculty: 82
- Undergraduates: 2000
- Location: Pittsburgh, Pennsylvania, United States
- Campus: Oakland (Main)
- Website: https://www.business.pitt.edu/cba/

The College of Business Administration (CBA) is one of the 17 schools and colleges of University of Pittsburgh located in Pittsburgh, Pennsylvania, United States. The CBA is the second largest degree granting school or college in the university and offers undergraduate Bachelor of Science in Business Administration degrees. The CBA is a constituent college of the university's Joseph M. Katz Graduate School of Business and is accredited by the Association to Advance Collegiate Schools of Business (AACSB International).

The CBA is part of Pitt Business, which refers to the collective capacity of the University of Pittsburgh's Katz Graduate School of Business, which offers Masters of Business Administration degrees and other graduate programs, the College of Business Administration and five education and research centers.

== History ==
The University of Pittsburgh introduced business education in 1907 as the Evening School of Economics, Accounts, and Finance with classes meeting in the Fulton Building on Sixth Street in Pittsburgh. Three years later the School of Economics, named for London's famed school, was formally set up on Pitt's Oakland campus. The school was renamed the College of Business Administration in 1923.

== Location ==
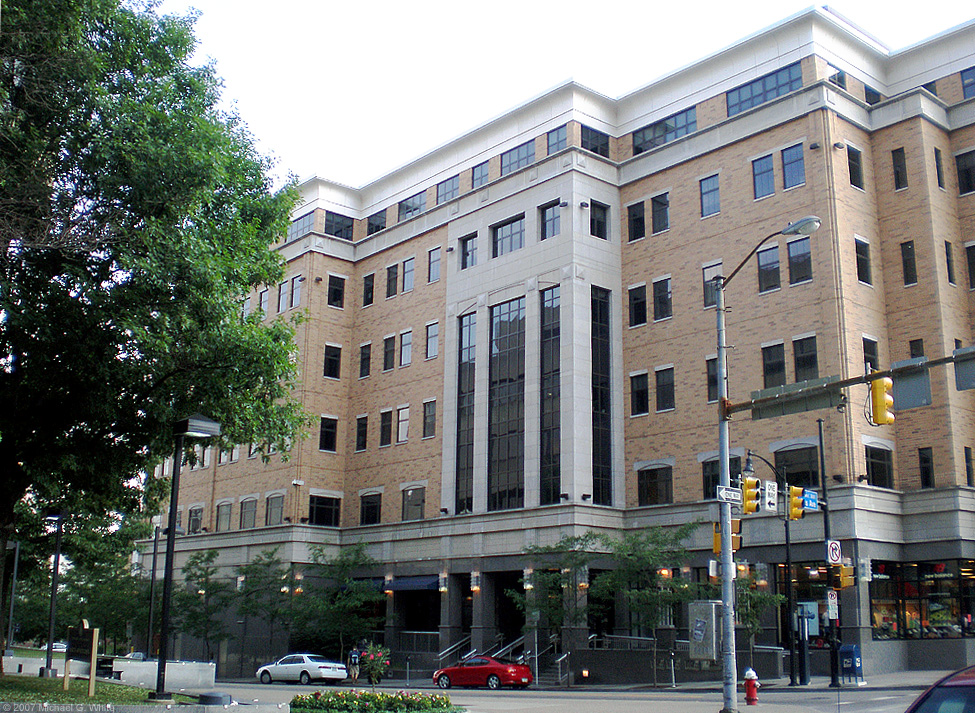
Pitt CBA is primarily housed in the university's Sennott Square

The CBA is headquartered at the second floor of Sennott Square. The business college is the second largest college at the University, behind the School of Arts and Sciences, enrolling approximately 2,000 students. Students also have access to facilities in the university's Katz Graduate School of Business' Mervis Hall.

== Academics ==
Business school rankings

The curriculum requirements for the University of Pittsburgh College of Business Administration includes 120 credit hours of classes split by Arts and Sciences (51 credits), Business Core Curriculum (36 credits), Major Course Requirements (15-21 credits) and Electives (12-18 credits). The University of Pittsburgh College of Business Administration focuses an Experience-Based Learning curriculum that gives students to expand their skills through participation in case studies, group work, and presentations with real world companies. Students can also take project courses such as Consulting Field Projects and Projects in Marketing in which they work with corporate clients to solve their business problems. Companies such as Honda, Nissan, Goal Financial, American Eagle Outfitters, and Chevrolet have participated in the past.

The University of Pittsburgh CBA offers access to a Financial Analysis Laboratory in Mervis Hall. The facility allows students to work with the equipment and technology used in the capital markets industry. The 3,000 square foot space resembles the trading floor maintained by an investment bank or financial firm, and is equipped with 58 computer stations, tote display boards, a ticker, plasma display screens, and presentation technologies.

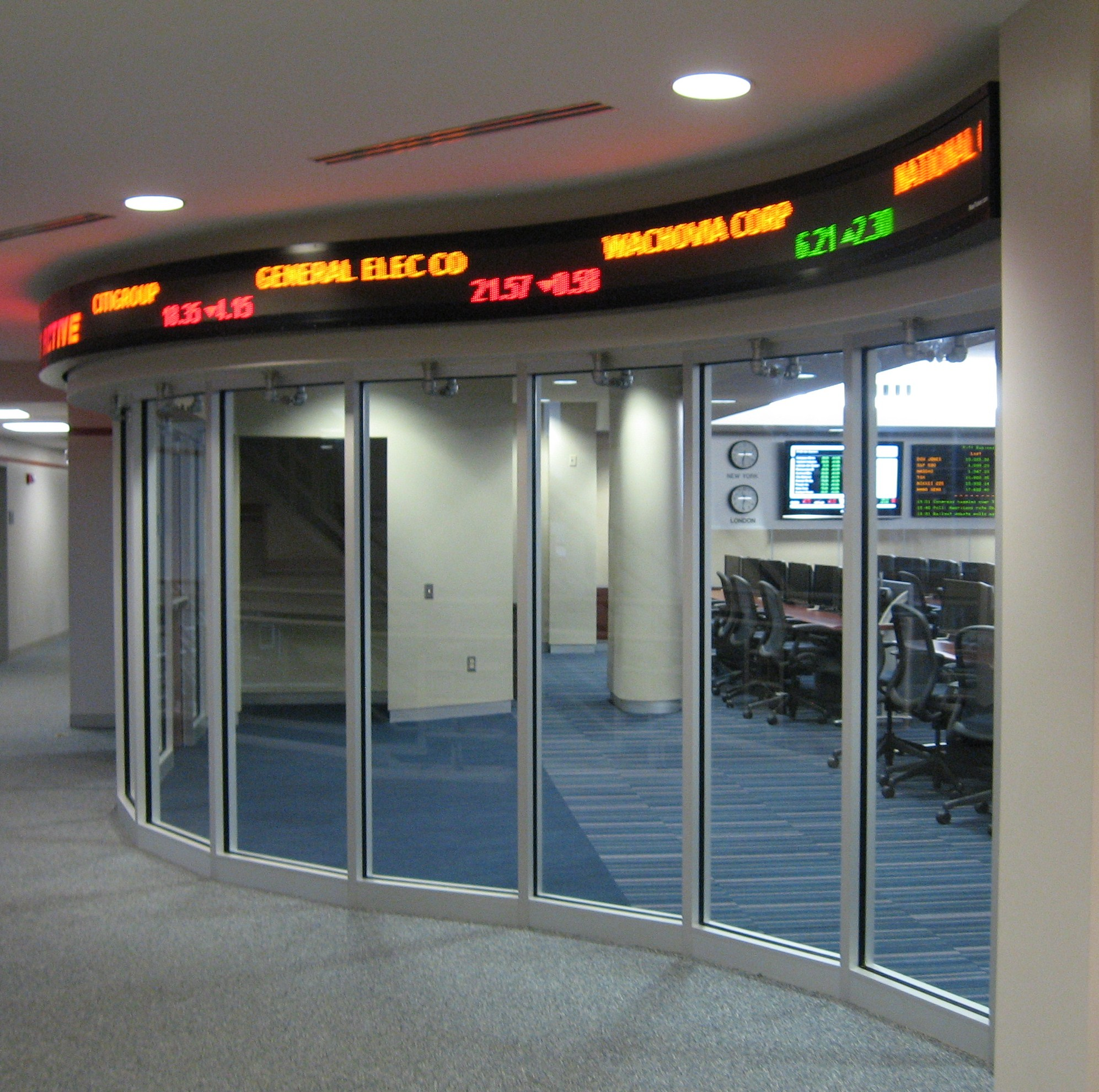
Financial Analysis Lab in Mervis Hall

=== Business Majors ===
- Accounting
- Finance
- Supply Chain Management
- Marketing
- Global Management
- Human Resources Management
- Business Information Systems

=== Certificate Programs ===
- Certificate Program in International Business (CPIB)
- Certificate Program in Leadership and Ethics (CPLE)
- Certificate Program in Innovation and Entrepreneurship (CPIE)
- Certificate Program in Sports Management (CPSM)
- Certificate Program in Business Analytics (CPBA)
- Undergraduate Certificate in Supply Chain Management (CSCM)

=== Double Degree Programs ===
- Bachelor of Science in Business Administration degree from the College of Business Administration and a Bachelor of Science or Bachelor of Arts degree from the university's Dietrich School of Arts and Sciences.
- Bachelor of Science in Business Administration degree from the College of Business Administration and a Bachelor of Science degree from the university's School of Information Sciences.
- Bachelor of Science in Business Administration degree from the College of Business Administration and a Bachelor of Arts degree in Health Services from the university's College of General Studies

=== International Internship Program ===
The University of Pittsburgh College of Business Administration has also been noted for its International Internship Program. This program is fourteen weeks, including two weeks on the University of Pittsburgh campus and twelve weeks abroad. The program is designed for Juniors and Seniors to gain work experience, develop professional skill and earn academic credit in a foreign setting. The programs includes sites in Beijing, Berlin, Madrid, Milan, Santiago and São Paulo.

== Student organizations ==
The University of Pittsburgh College of Business Administration offers many organizations for business students to develop hands-on leadership skills related to their field.

The student organizations include:

- Alpha Kappa Psi
- American Marketing Association
- Aspiring Business Professionals
- Beta Alpha Psi
- Delta Sigma Pi
- Enactus
- Fashion Business Association
- League of Emerging Analytics Professionals
- Phi Beta Lambda
- The Pitt Business Review
- Pitt Consulting Club
- Pitt Collegiate DECA
- Roberto Clemente Minority Business Association
- Society for International Business
- Sports Business Association
- The Socially Responsible Investment Portfolio
- Undergraduate Finance Club
- University of Pittsburgh Accounting Association
- Women in Business

== See also ==
- Joseph M. Katz Graduate School of Business, Pitt's graduate business school
