= Wesley W. Posvar Hall =

Building at the University of Pittsburgh

Coordinates: 40.441648°N 79.953792°W

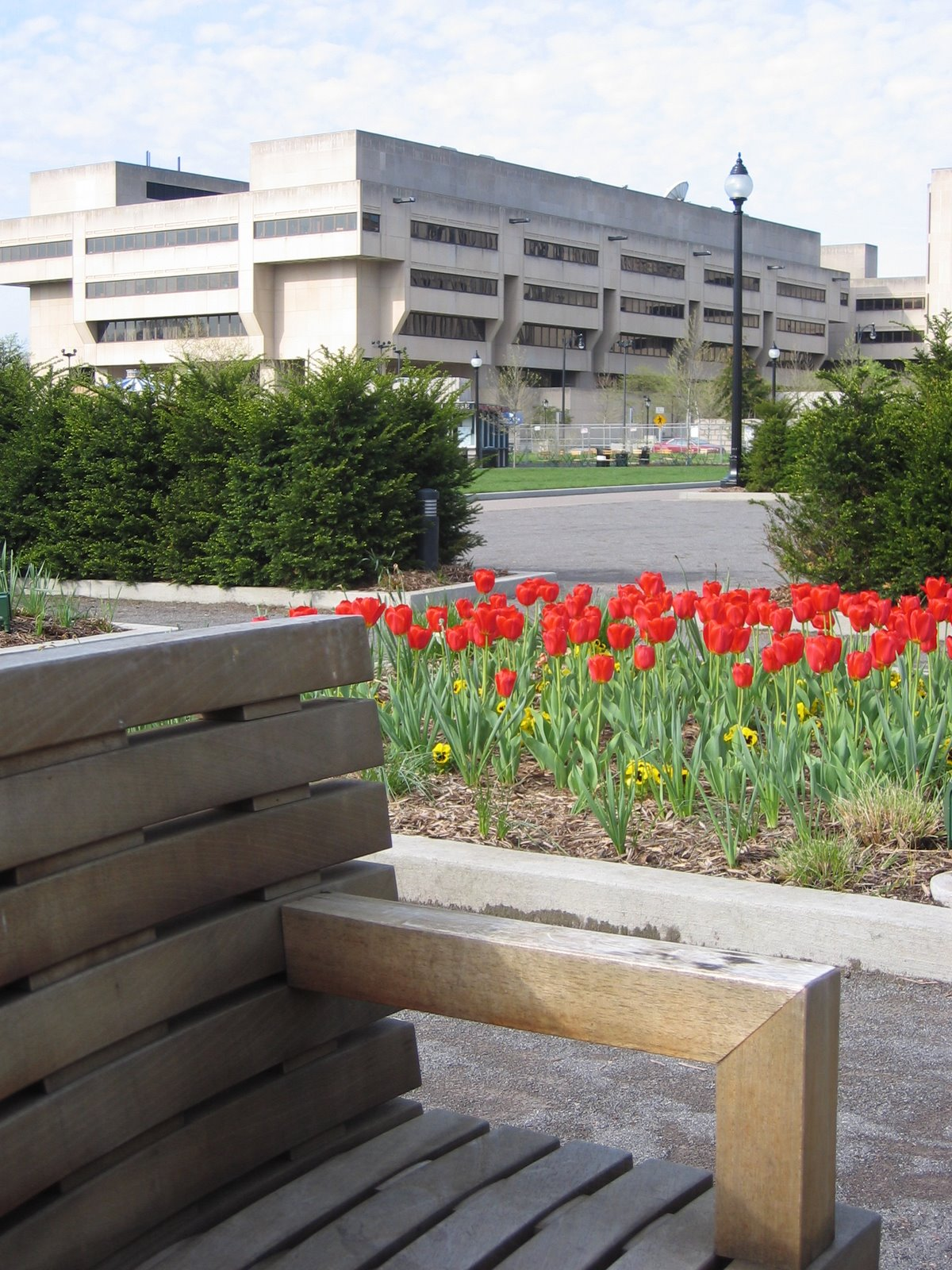
Wesley W. Posvar Hall seen from Schenley Plaza in Apr, 2007

Wesley W. Posvar Hall (WWPH), formerly known as Forbes Quadrangle, is a landmark building on the campus of the University of Pittsburgh in Pittsburgh, Pennsylvania, United States. At 744,695 square feet (69,184.4 m^{2}) it is the largest academic-use building on campus, providing administrative offices, classrooms, lecture halls, a food court, and computer labs. The hall sits on the former site of Forbes Field and contains several artifacts, including the former stadium's home plate and one of two surviving Langley Aerodromes.

Posvar Hall houses Pitt's School of Education, College of General Studies, School of Public and International Affairs, University Center for International Studies, and the Dietrich School of Arts and Sciences's social sciences departments.

== Construction ==
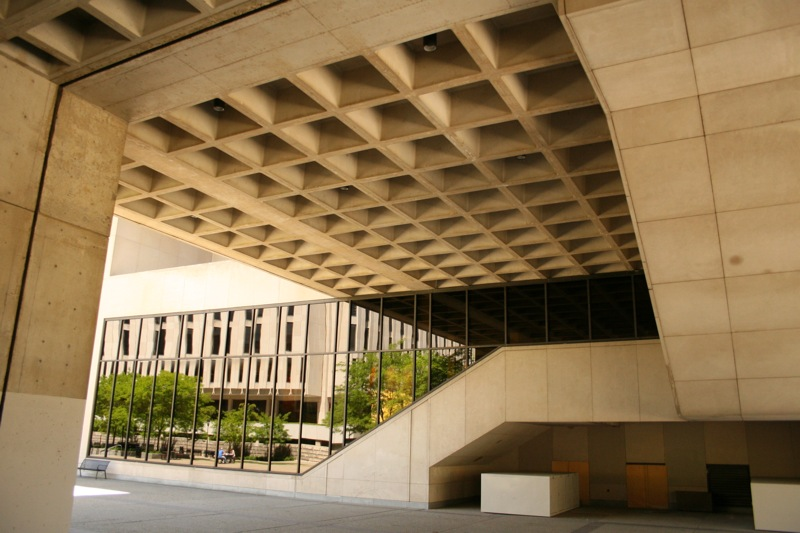
Posvar Hall

Posvar Hall was designed by a consortium of architects, including Louis Valentour of Johnstone Newcomer & Valentour, who worked under the watch of university consultant Max Abramowitz. Construction began in 1975 and was completed in 1978 with the dedication occurring on October 19, 1978. The building sits on the former site of Forbes Field baseball stadium and beside the university's Hillman Library on the corner of Schenley Drive and Roberto Clemente Drive, with Bouquet Street running along its west side. Enclosed passageways connect Posvar Hall to David Lawrence Hall, the Barco Law Building, and the Litchfield Towers.

Posvar Hall was designed in the Brutalist style and is constructed with concrete with a limestone exterior. Its height was limited to five stories so it would not compete with The Carnegie Institute directly across Schenley Plaza. Construction costs exceeded $38 million (equivalent to $153.1 million in 2024). Its floor space slightly exceeds that of the Cathedral of Learning. It has 2,000 windows, 574 offices, 30 seminar rooms, three lecture halls, one mile of corridors, and nearly 500 parking spaces in a two-level garage below the facility.

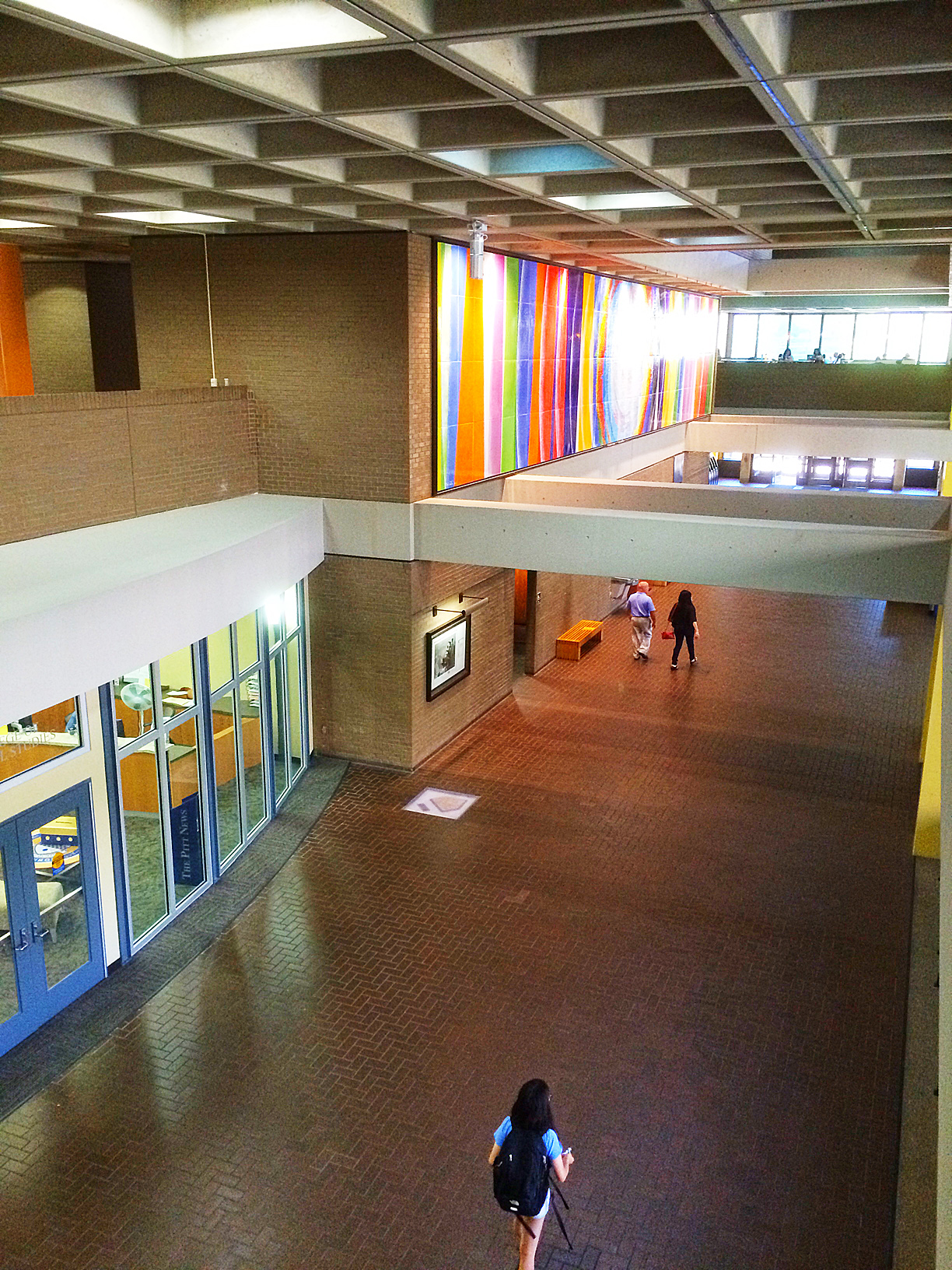
Posvar Hall Galleria on the first floor is often used as meeting space and contains several lounge areas on the second floor. Home plate of Forbes Field can be seen near the middle of the photo.

The central area of the interior space is called the Galleria and contains various artwork including Virgil Cantini's mural Enlightenment and Joy and one of Samuel Pierpont Langley's aerodromes. Escalators transport individuals between floors.

Originally named Forbes Quadrangle, it was renamed on October 21, 1999, by the university's board of trustees in honor of Wesley W. Posvar (1925–2001), the 15th chancellor of the university.

== Forbes Field ==
The building stands on the original site of Forbes Field, home of the Pittsburgh Pirates baseball team from 1909–1970 and, at various times, the Pittsburgh Steelers, Homestead Grays, and Pitt's own football team. The stadium was dismantled starting in July 1971, and construction on the new building started soon afterwards and continued until 1974. The building incorporates many reminders of the famous ballpark—the home plate of Forbes Field remains near its exact spot, protected under plexiglass. The outfield wall is outlined in the sidewalk by bricks, and the portion of the famously deep left-center field wall still stands across the street, marked "457 Feet". Originally, the classrooms were numbered to reflect the seating section of the old stadium where each classroom was located. However, this system confused people, so it was changed in 2004 to a standard four-digit numbering system.

== Art ==
Cantini's New Horizons, Skyscape

Virgil Cantini's colorful porcelain enamel on steel mural Enlightenment and Joy (1977) is on display on the ground floor. The piece is an example of Cantini's use of circles, representing the Earth, Moon, and Sun, an artistic trend inspired by the Apollo Moon landings. The work was created to honor former University Chancellor Edward Litchfield, who died in a plane crash in 1968.

Cantini's 1965 steel rod and multicolored glass sculpture New Horizons, Skyscape is also on display near room 1500. The sculpture was donated to the university by the Joseph Horne Company from its department store in the South Hills Village mall where it had previously been on display.

Tony Smith's 1971 20-foot-tall (6.1 m) painted steel sculpture Light Up!, commissioned by Westinghouse and originally displayed in downtown Pittsburgh, can be found outside Posvar Hall, between it and Hillman Library. Donated to and re-installed at Pitt in 1988, it was temporarily loaned to the Museum of Modern Art and displayed in front of the Seagram Building in New York City for a 1988 Tony Smith retrospective.

== Aerodrome ==
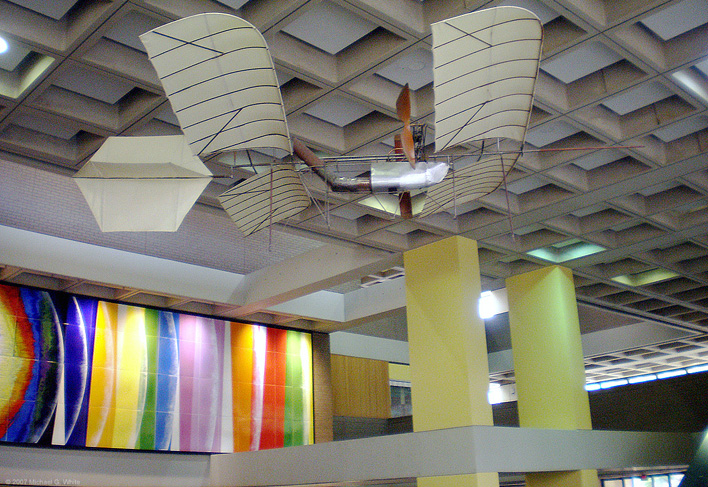
One of two surviving Samuel P. Langley Aerodromes, Aerodrome No. 6, can be seen inside Posvar Hall. Behind the aerodrome, a portion of Virgil Cantini's mural Enlightenment and Joy can be seen.

One of two surviving Langley Aerodromes, Aerodrome No. 6 dating from 1896, is displayed in the ground floor lobby amid various artworks and sculptures. The Aerodrome was an experimental aircraft commissioned by the United States Army from former Pitt professor and Smithsonian Institution Secretary Samuel Langley. It flew 5,000 feet (1,500 m) in November 1896, further proving (after the success of No. 5 in May) the feasibility of engine-driven heavier-than-air flight. The aircraft was restored in part by Pitt engineering students. Fabric on the wings and tail is the only new material, however; the tail and several wing ribs were rebuilt using wood provided by the Smithsonian Institution and dating from the same time period. The restoration was completed over two years and the plane placed on display in Posvar Hall in 1980.

== Gallery ==
Cantini's Enlightenment and Joy

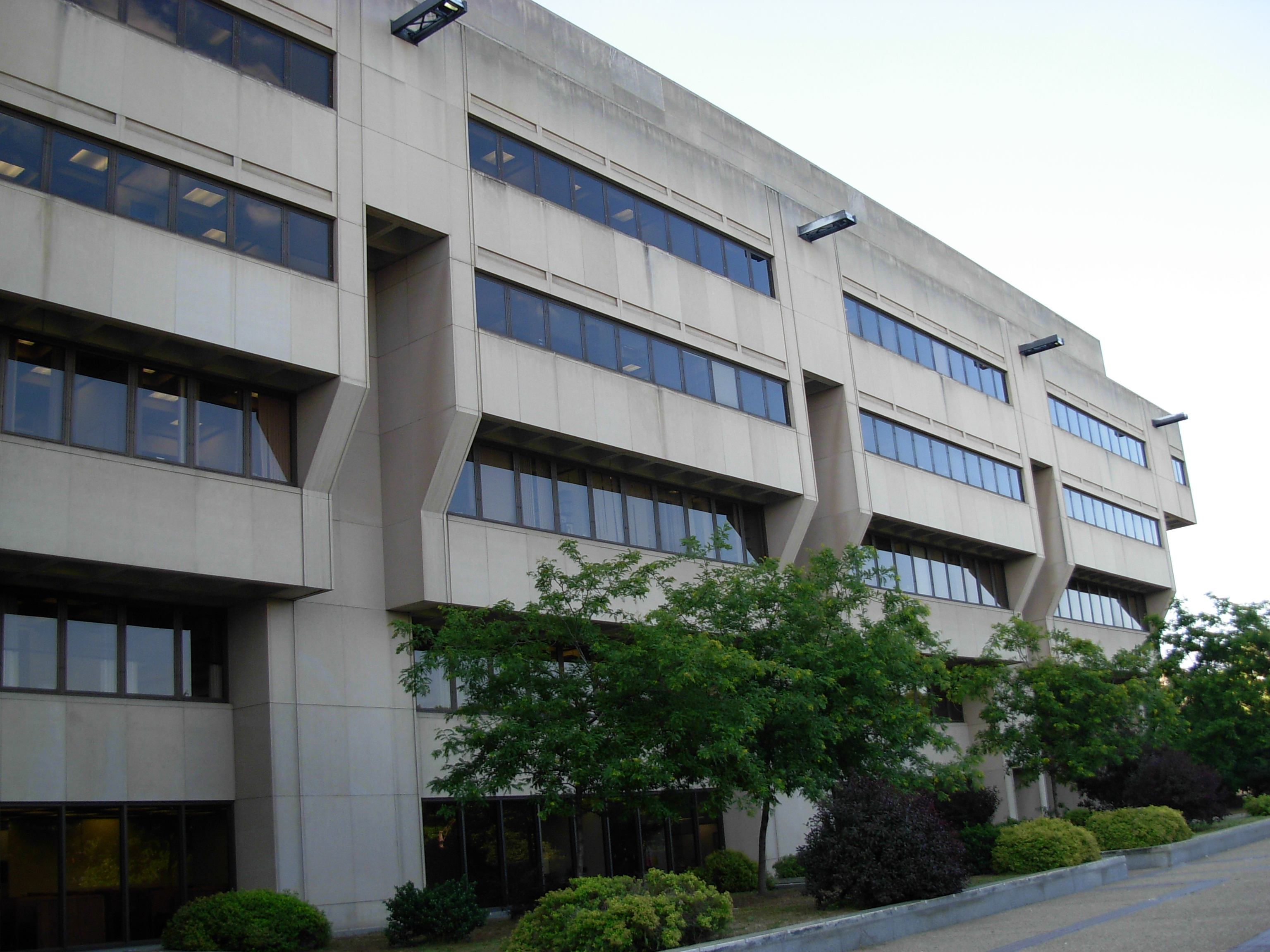
Posvar Hall

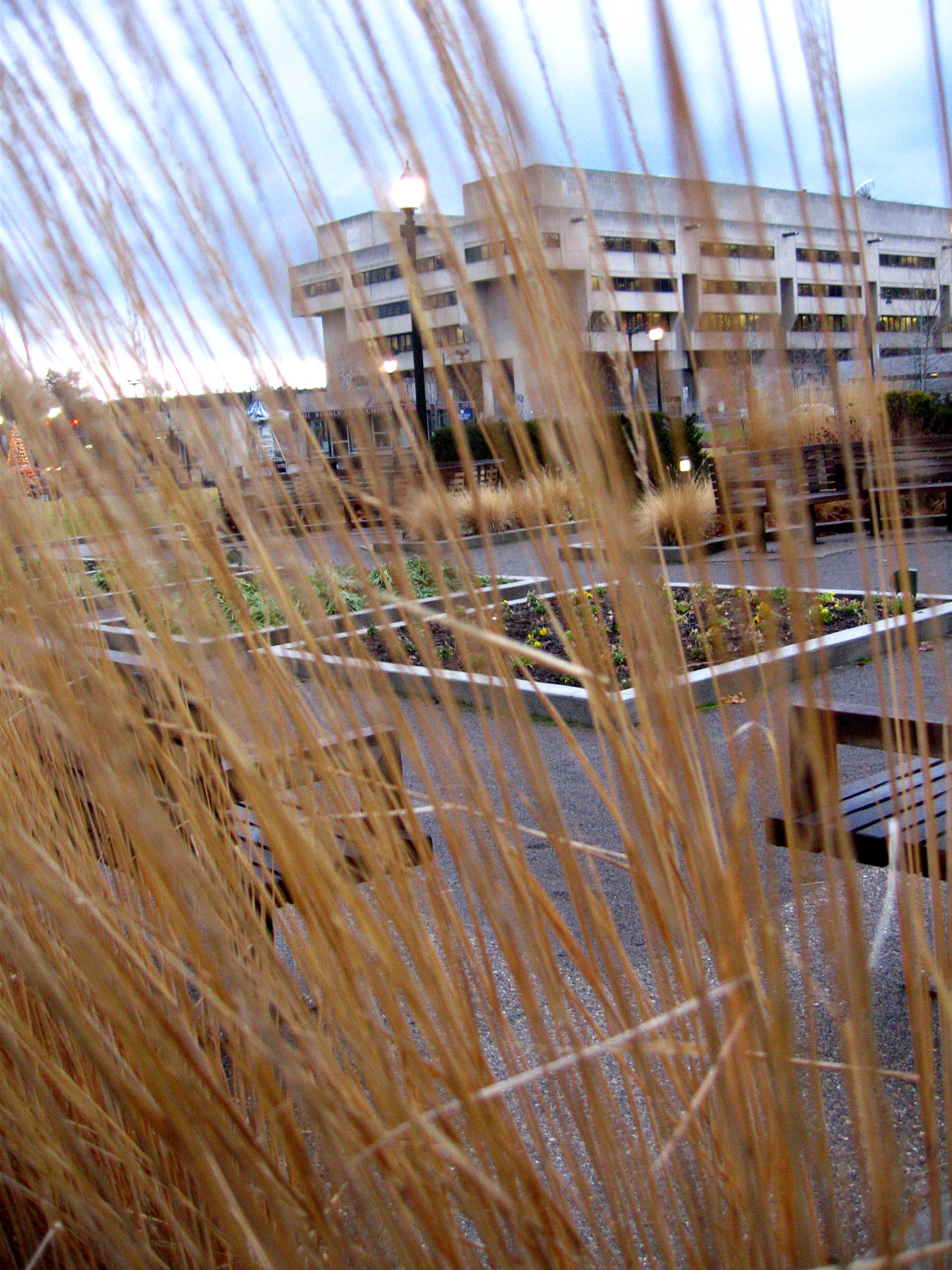
Posvar in snowless winter

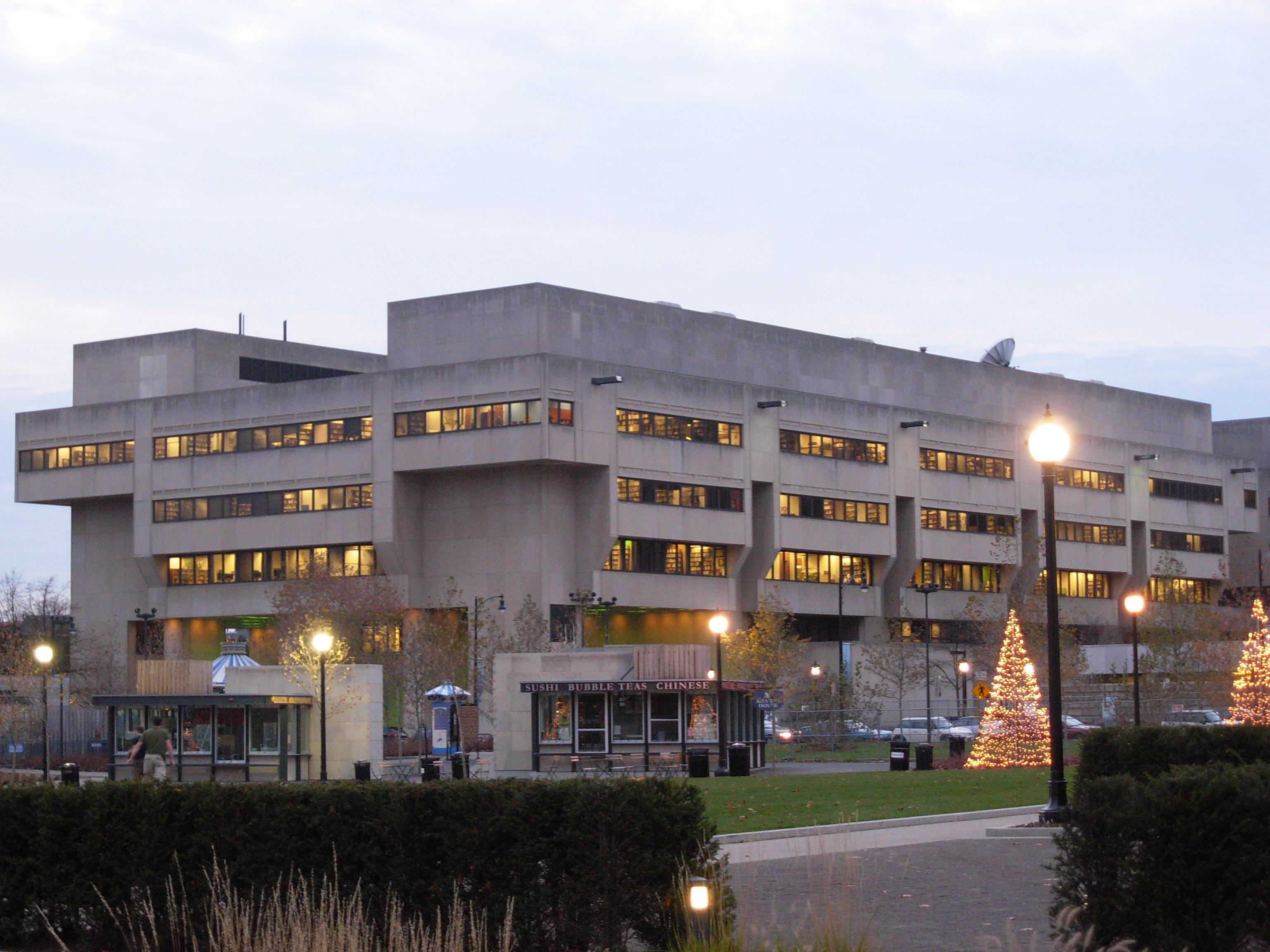
Posvar Hall

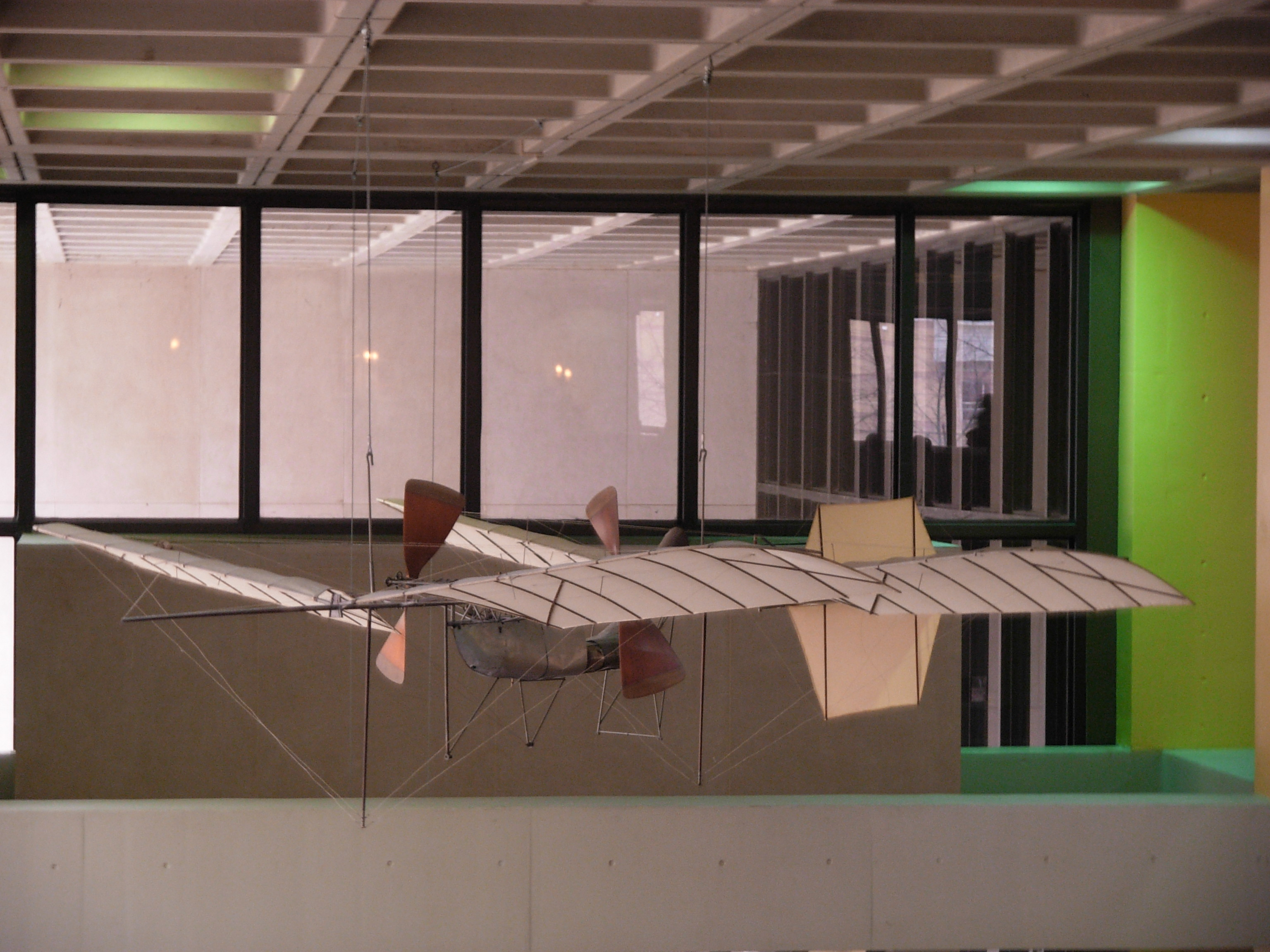
Langley Aerodrome No. 6

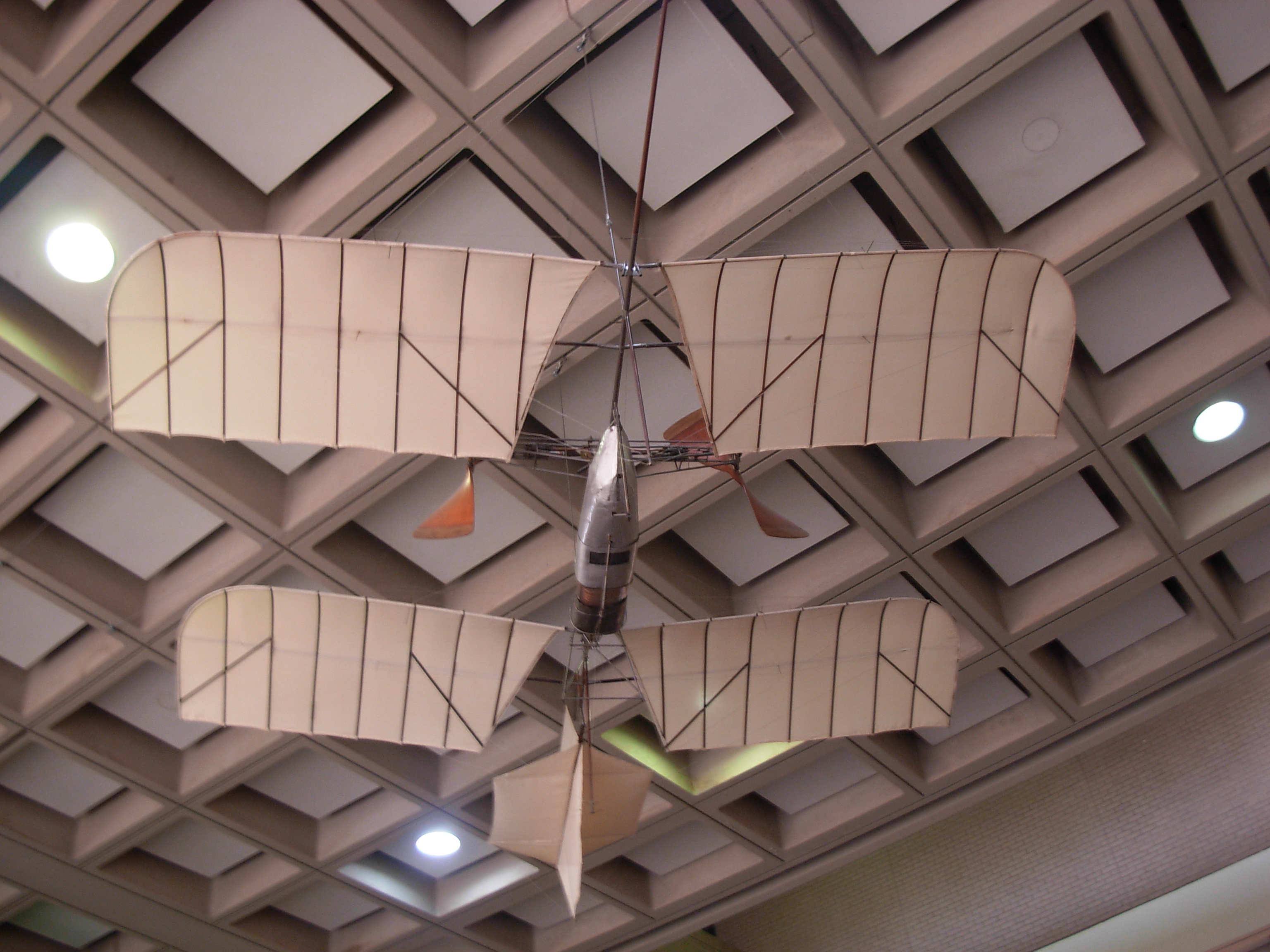
Langley Aerodrome No. 6 from below

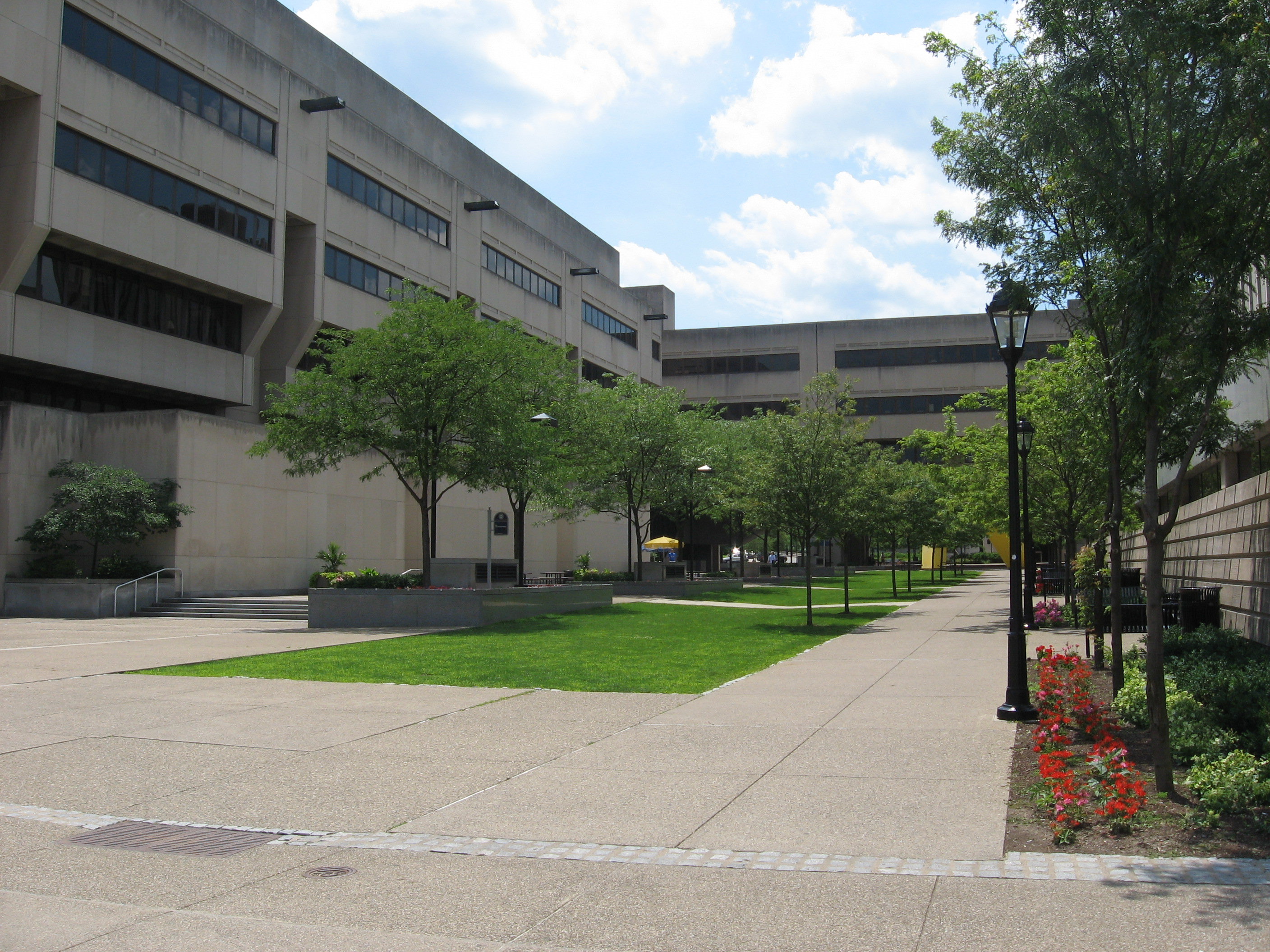
Courtyard. Posvar Hall is to the left and Hillman Library is to the right.

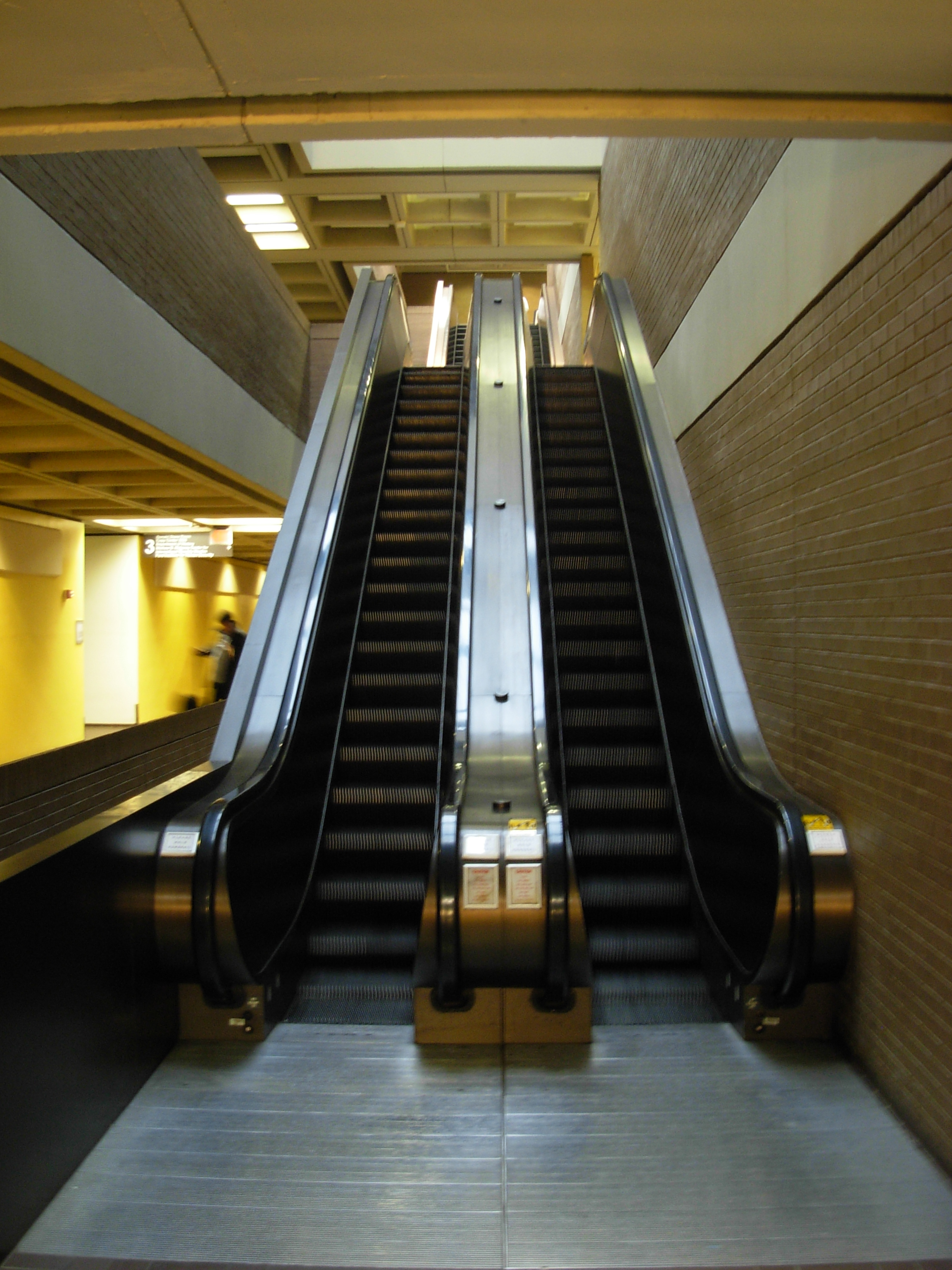
One of many escalators in Posvar Hall

Preceded by Barco Law Building	University of Pittsburgh buildings Posvar Hall; Constructed: 1975-1978	Succeeded by Victoria Building
