= Schenley Farms Historic District =

Historic district in Pennsylvania, United States

- U.S. National Register of Historic Places
- U.S. Historic district
- City of Pittsburgh Historic District
- Pittsburgh Landmark – PHLF
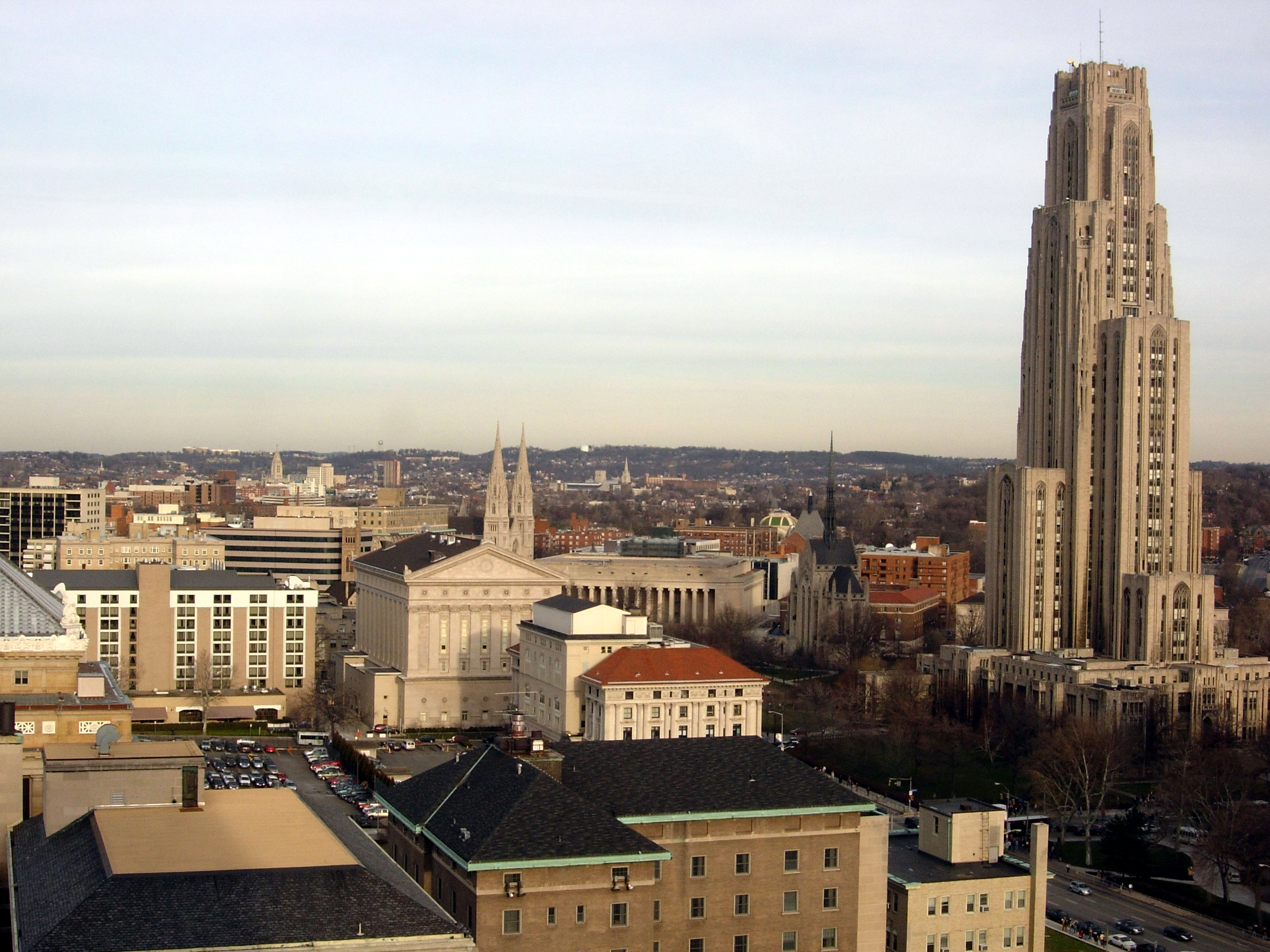
- Looking Northeast along 5th Avenue in the Schenley Farms Historic District

- Location within Pittsburgh Location within Pennsylvania Location within the United States
- Location: Roughly bounded by Andover Terrace, Centre, Bellefield, and Parkman Avenues, Dithridge, Thackeray, Forbes and Mawhinney, Pittsburgh, Pennsylvania, United States
- Coordinates: 40°26′39.99″N 79°57′17.40″W
- Area: 170 acres (0.69 km^{2})
- NRHP reference No.: 83002213 (original); 12000984 (increase 1); 100011241 (increase 2)

Significant dates
- Added to NRHP: July 22, 1983
- Boundary increases: November 28, 2012; January 3, 2025
- Designated CPHD: Shenley Farms May 1982 and Oakland Civic Center, April 7, 1992
- Designated PHLF: 1976

The Schenley Farms Historic District, also referred to as the Schenley Farms–Oakland Civic District, is a historic district listed on the National Register of Historic Places that is located in the Oakland section of Pittsburgh, Pennsylvania, United States.

It comprises two separately designated City of Pittsburgh historic districts: the Oakland Civic Center Historic District consisting of publicly and privately owned institutional buildings, and the adjacent Schenley Farms Historic District consisting mainly of a planned residential development of the early 20th Century. The Schenley Farms Historic District is roughly bounded by Forbes Avenue including the Carnegie Museums of Pittsburgh on the south; South Dithridge and North Bellefield on the east, extending to include St. Paul's Cathedral and Rectory on Fifth Avenue and North Craig Street; Bigelow Boulevard, Andover Road, and Bryn Mawr Road on the northwest; and Thackeray Street through to Fifth Avenue on the southwest.

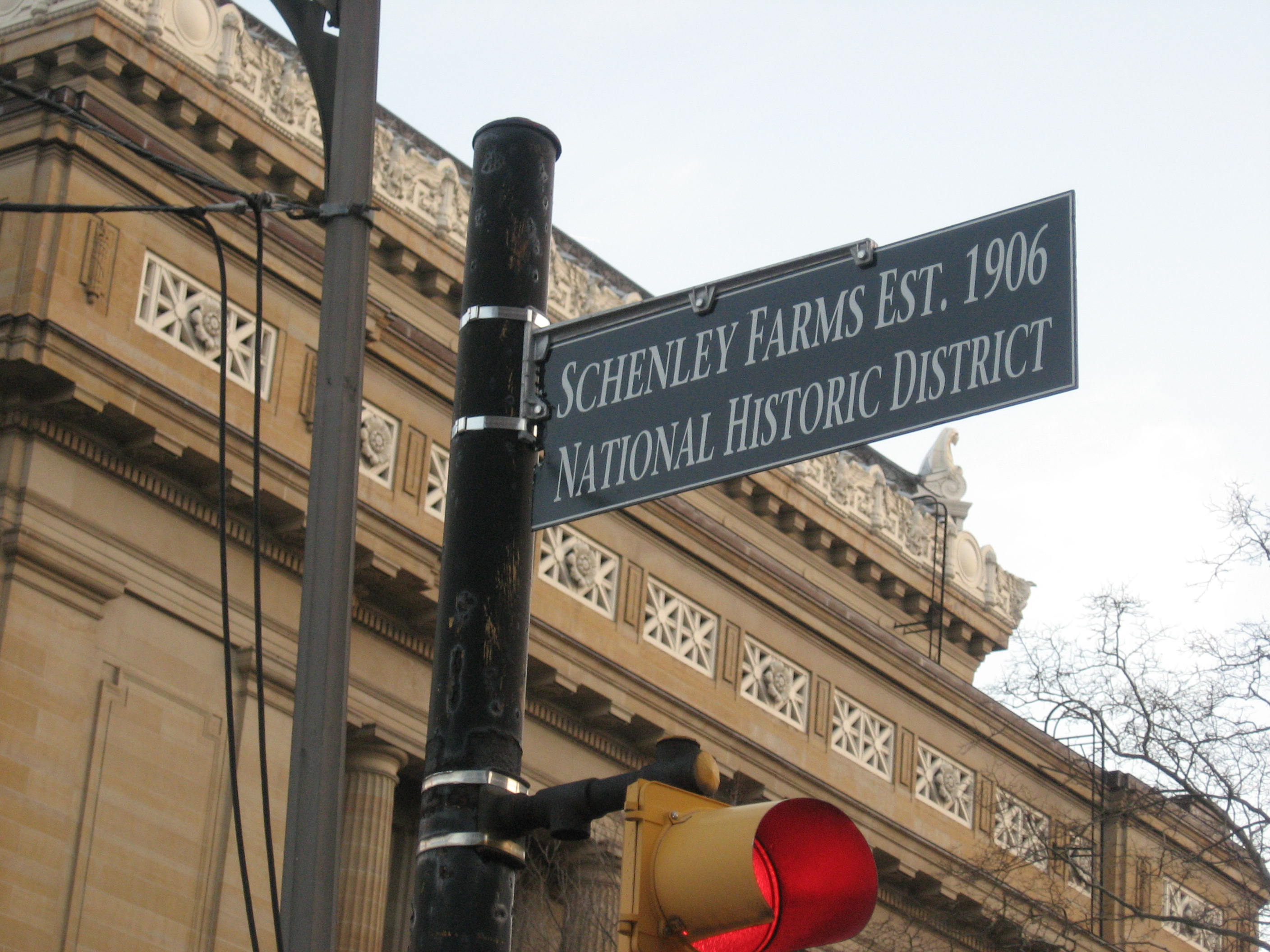
Historical marker for Schenley Farms

Noted for its late 19th And 20th Century Revivals architecture, it is home to a large portion of the campus of the University of Pittsburgh. The district comprises 154 contributing buildings, 31 of which are cultural or institutional buildings and 123 of which are residences in the northwest portion of the district. The historic district is a noted example of community planning and development following the City Beautiful movement that guided city planning and urban design in the United States from the mid-1890s through the first decade of the 20th century. The City Beautiful movement favored boulevards, parks, and formal civic buildings in the beaux-arts style.

In 1905, Franklin Nicola put forth a development plan in the City Beautiful style for Oakland, which included civic, social, residential, and educational zones along Bigelow Boulevard which ran through the heart of the neighborhood. The proposal centered on a series of monumental buildings created in styles evoking ancient Greece and the Italian Renaissance. Although Nicola's plan was not fully implemented, including a never-constructed Oakland town hall, it produced such landmarks as the Soldiers and Sailors Memorial Hall, the Masonic Temple (now the University of Pittsburgh's Alumni Hall), and the Pittsburgh Athletic Association.

Other major landmark buildings were added to the historic district after the pursuit of Nicola's designs had ended, including the landmark Cathedral of Learning and Heinz Memorial Chapel of the University of Pittsburgh and Mellon Institute. Contributing buildings in the historic district date from 1880 to 1979. A contributing building, the University Place Office Building, was razed in 2011.

== Historic district sites ==
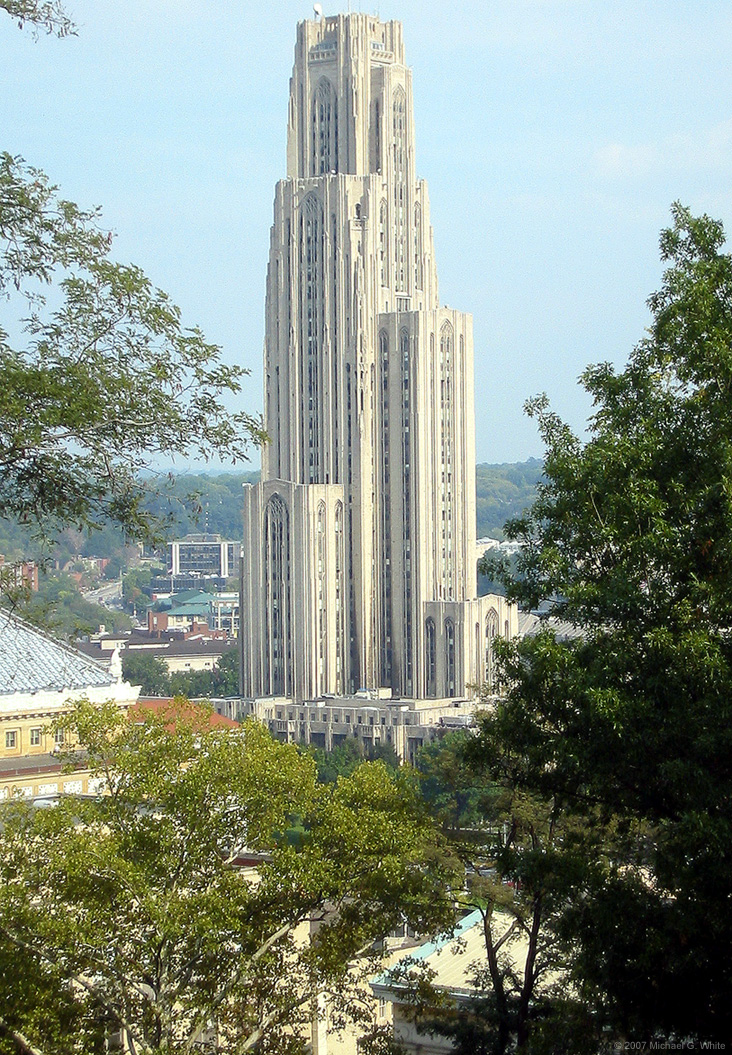
The Cathedral of Learning, itself on the National Register of Historic Places, is the main building of the University of Pittsburgh

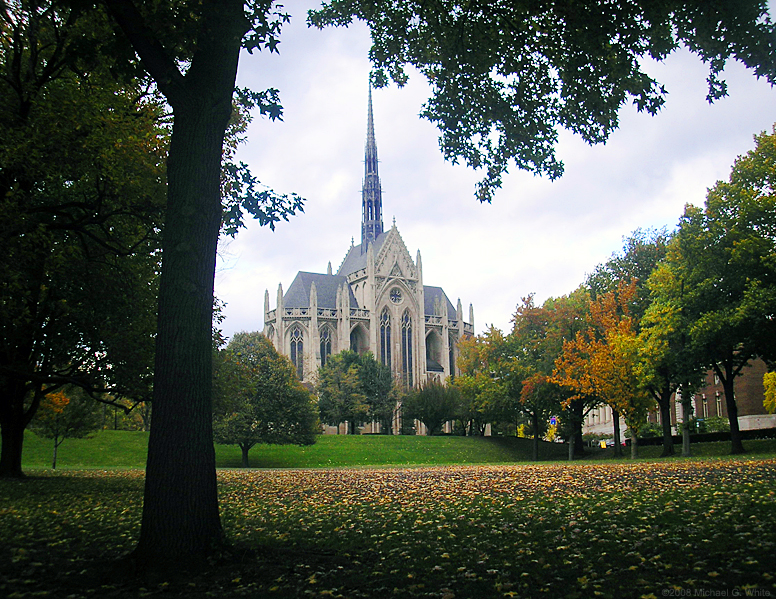
The University of Pittsburgh's Heinz Memorial Chapel

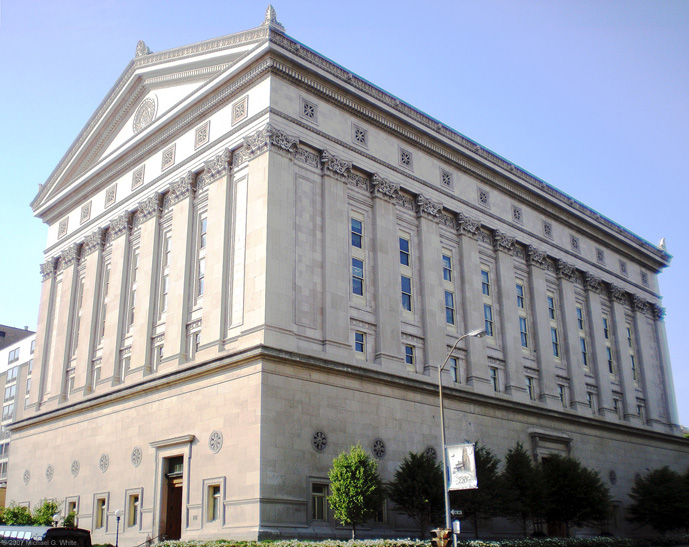
The former Masonic Temple, now Pitt's Alumni Hall

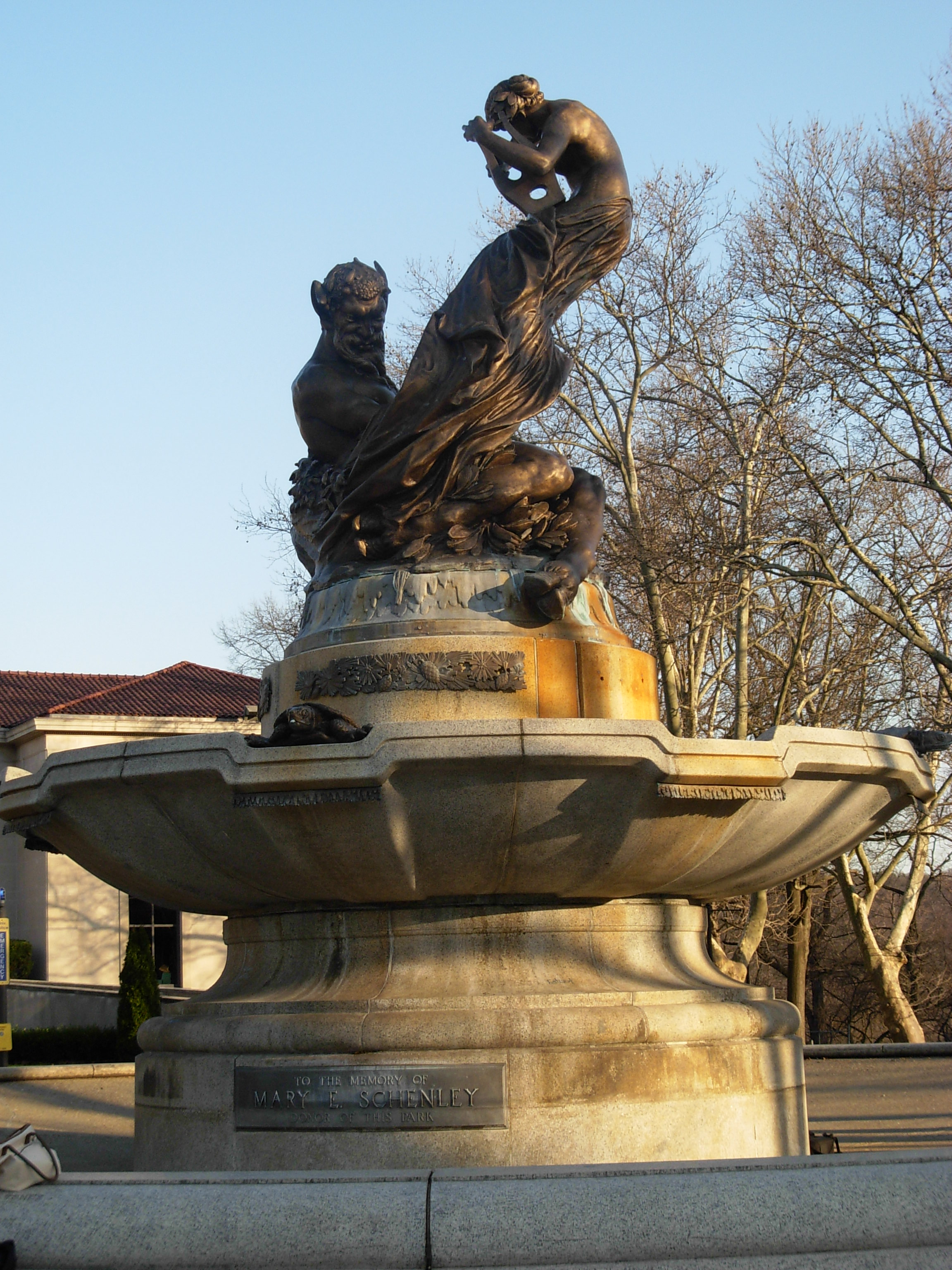
Mary Schenley Memorial Fountain (A Song to Nature)

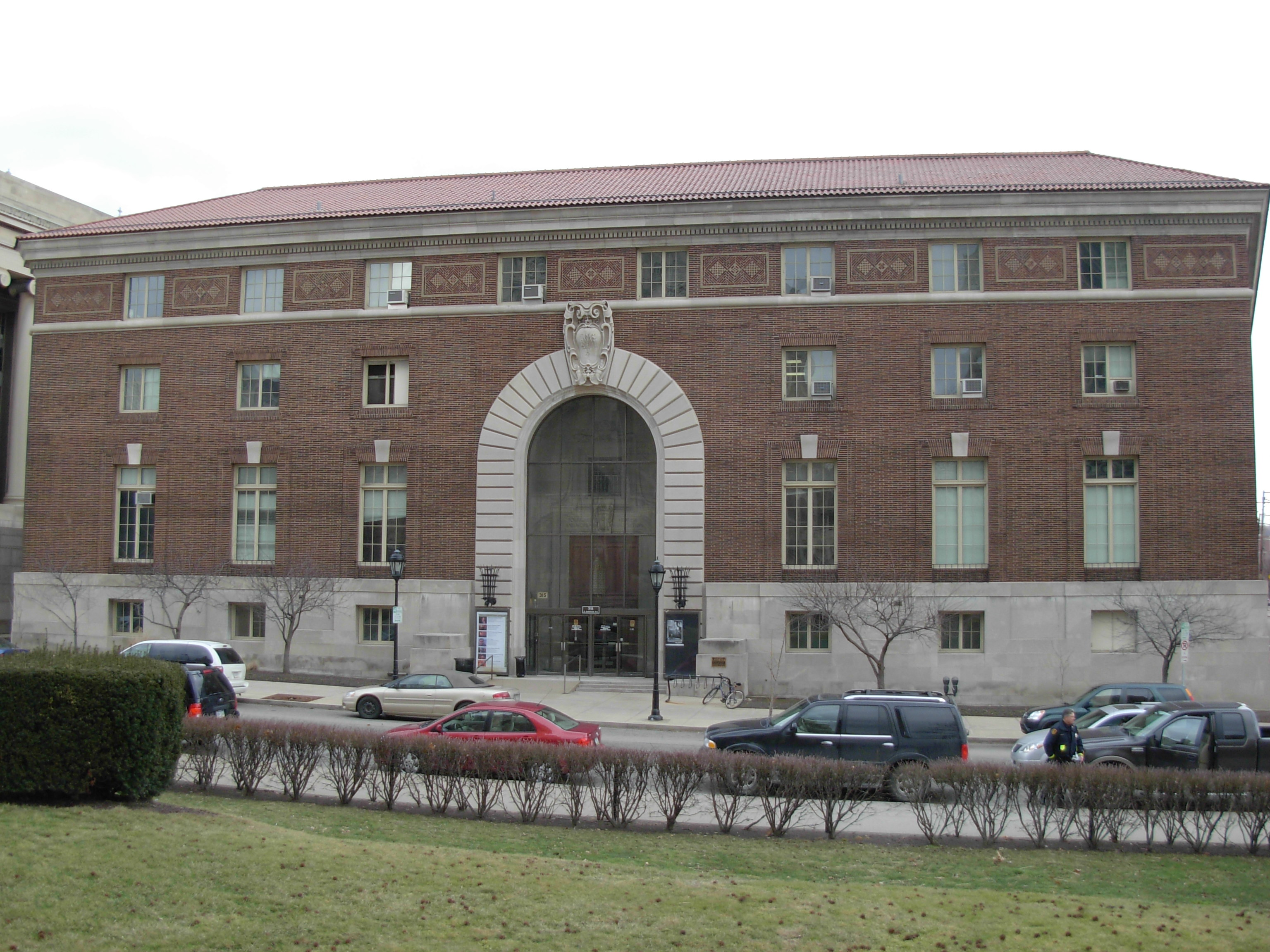
The former Y.M.H.A., is now Pitt's Bellefield Hall

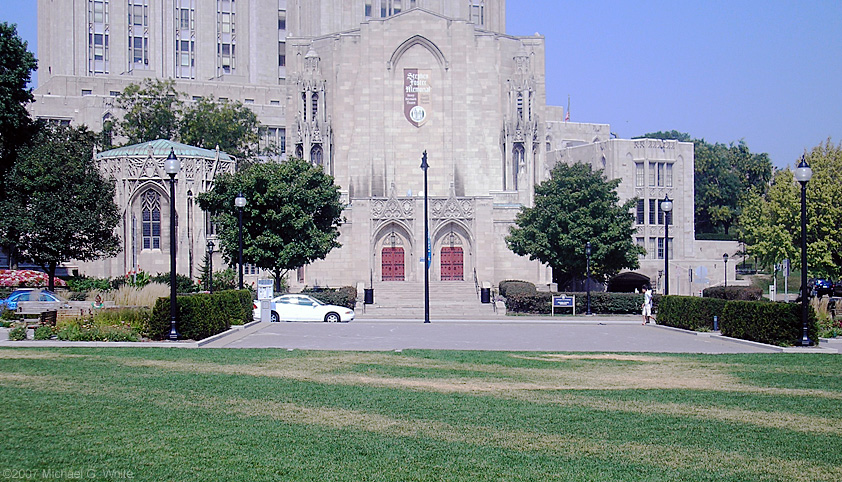
The Stephen Foster Memorial at the University of Pittsburgh

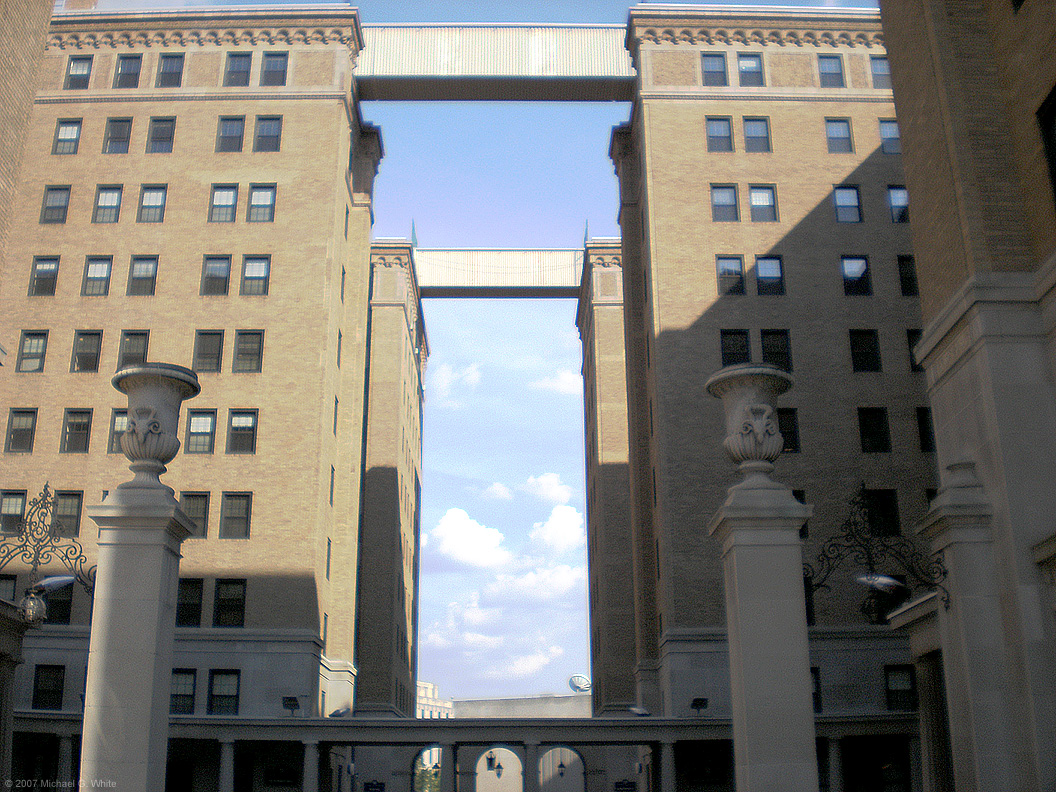
The former Schenley Apartments, now Schenley Quadrangle residences at the University of Pittsburgh

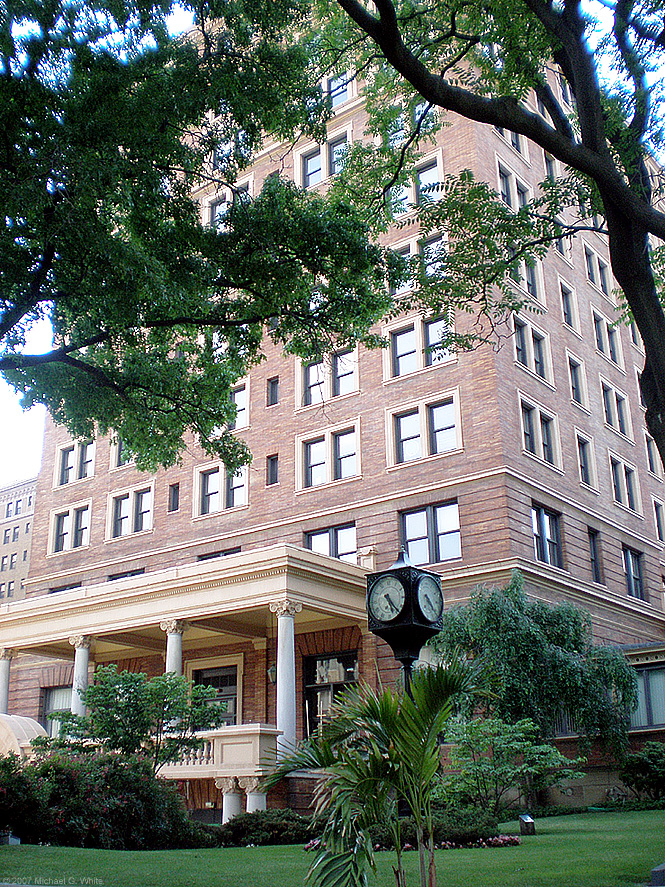
The former Schenley Hotel, now the University of Pittsburgh's William Pitt Union

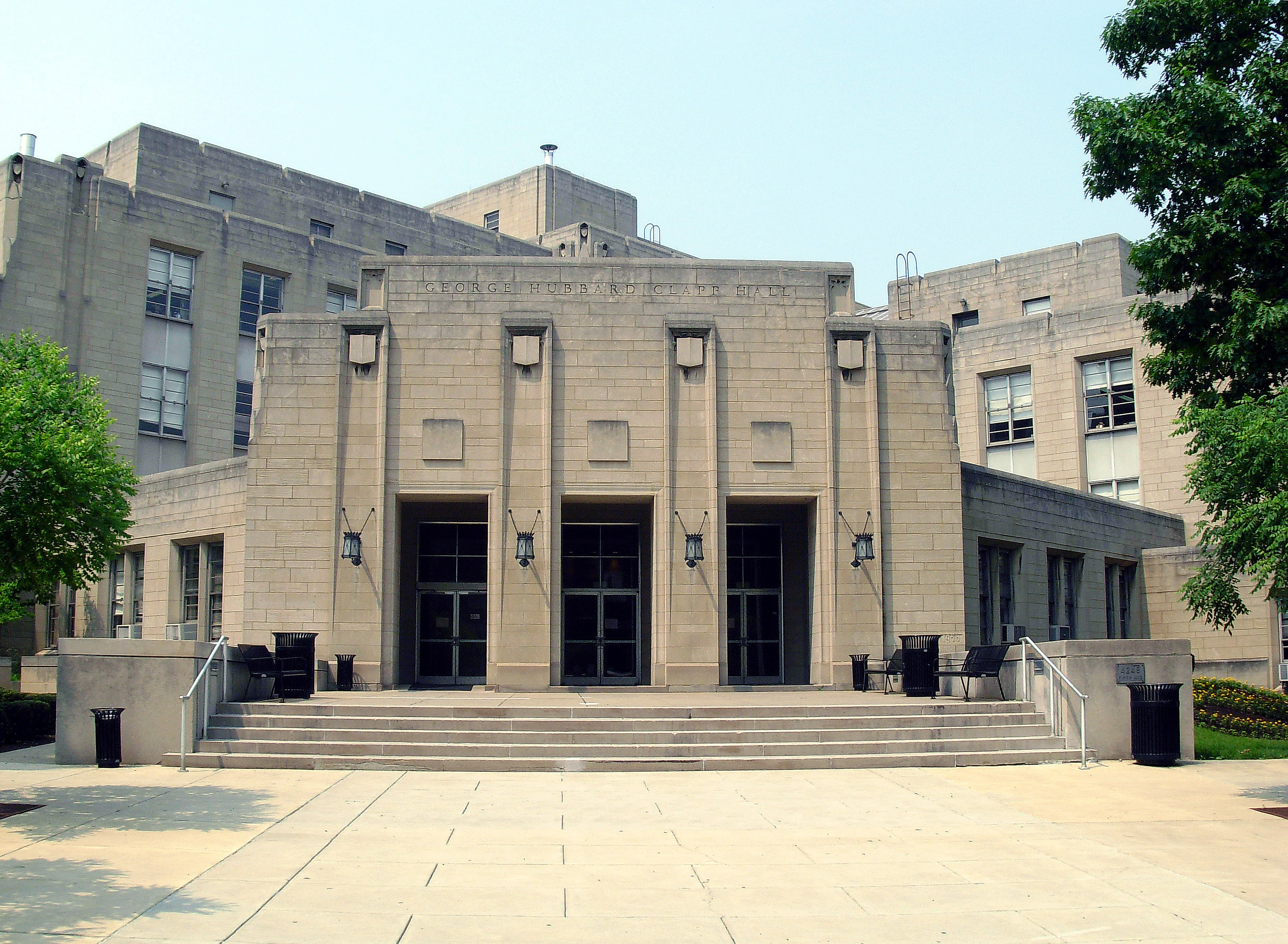
Clapp Hall at the University of Pittsburgh

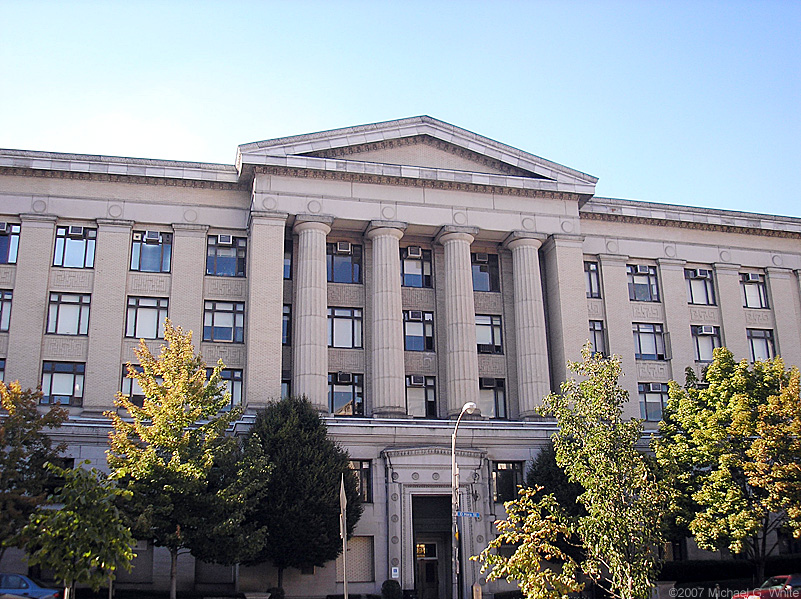
Former Mellon Institute building, now the University of Pittsburgh's Allen Hall

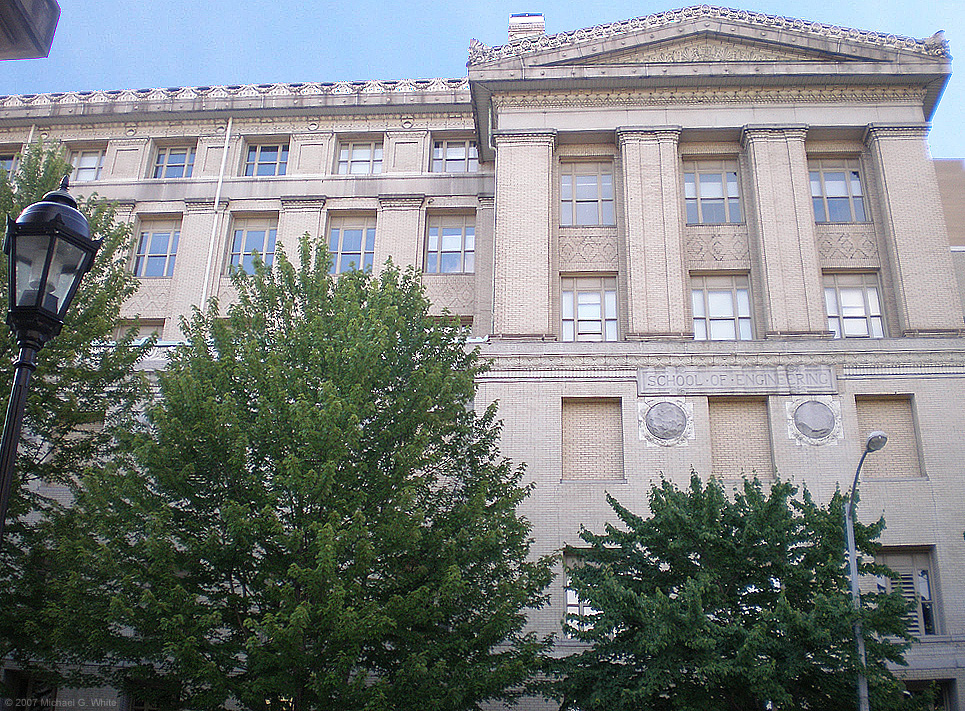
Thaw Hall at the University of Pittsburgh

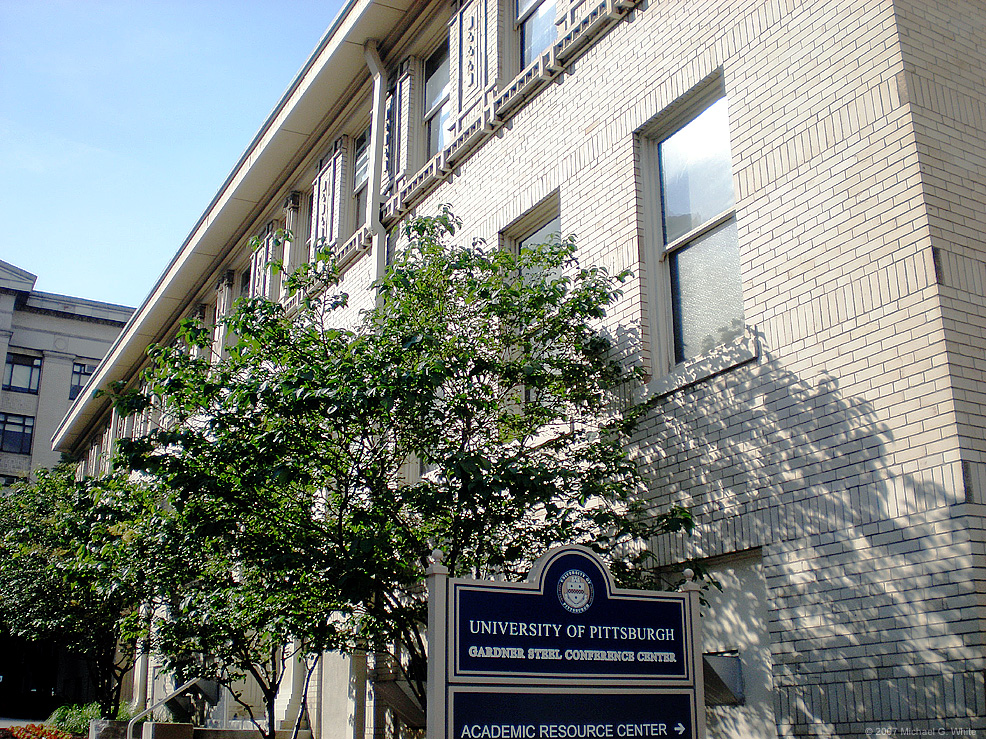
The former Central Turnverein, now the Gardner Steel Conference Center at the University of Pittsburgh

The former Ruskin Apartments, now the University of Pittsburgh's Ruskin Hall

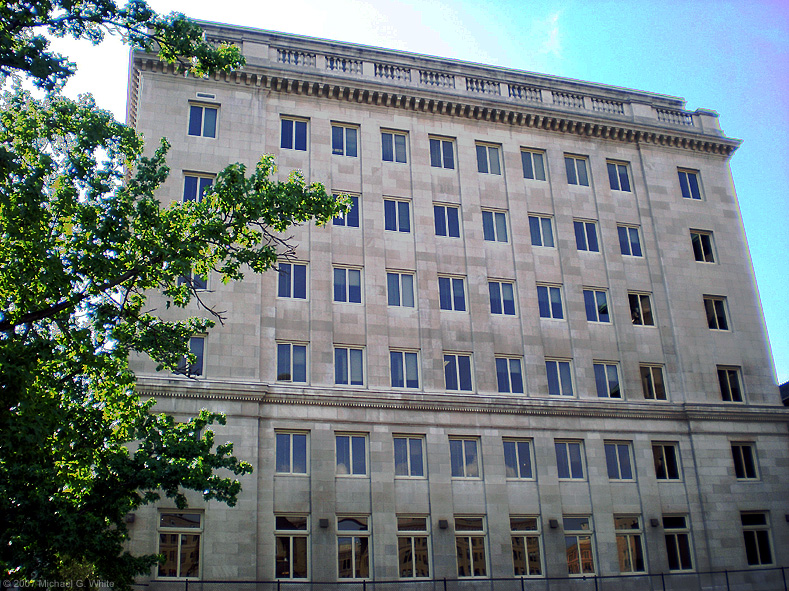
The former National Union Fire Insurance Company building, now the University of Pittsburgh's Thackeray Hall

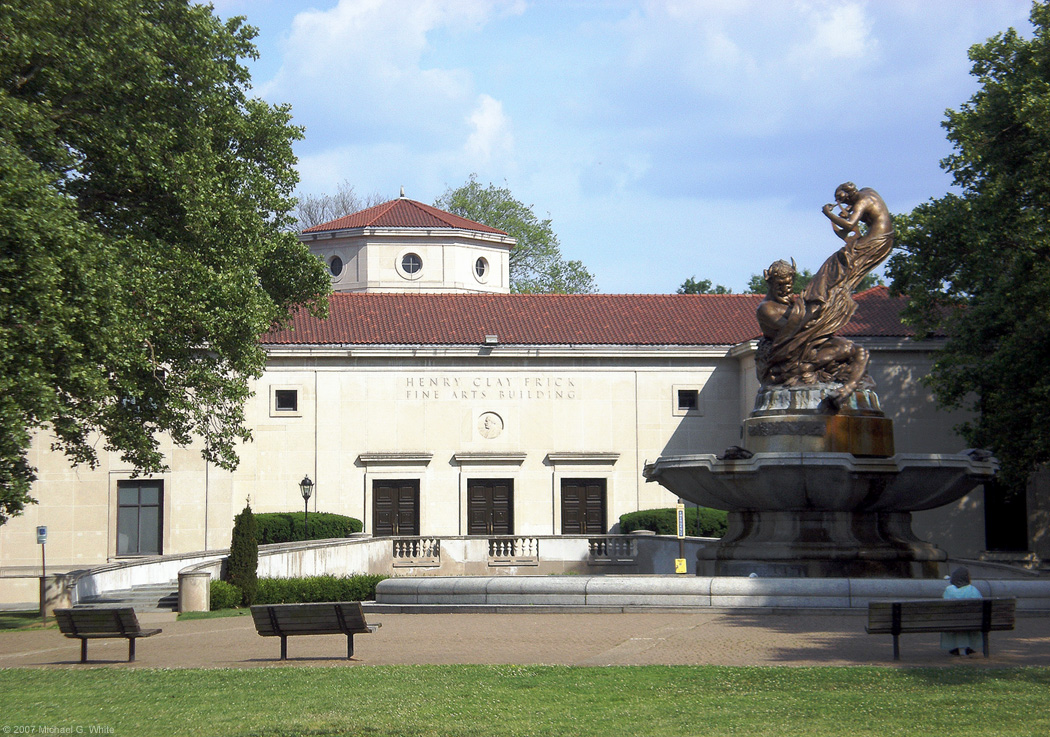
The Frick Fine Arts Building at the University of Pittsburgh

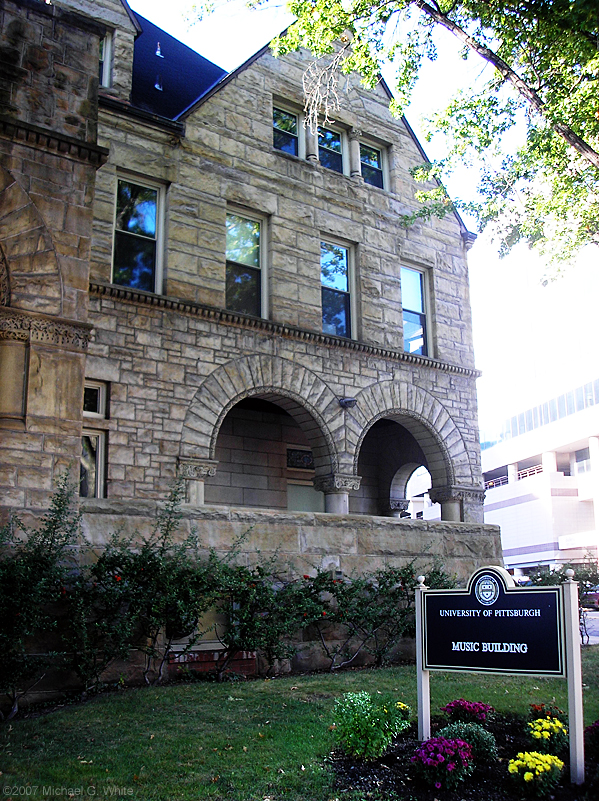
The former William Jacob Holland residence, now the Music Building at the University of Pittsburgh

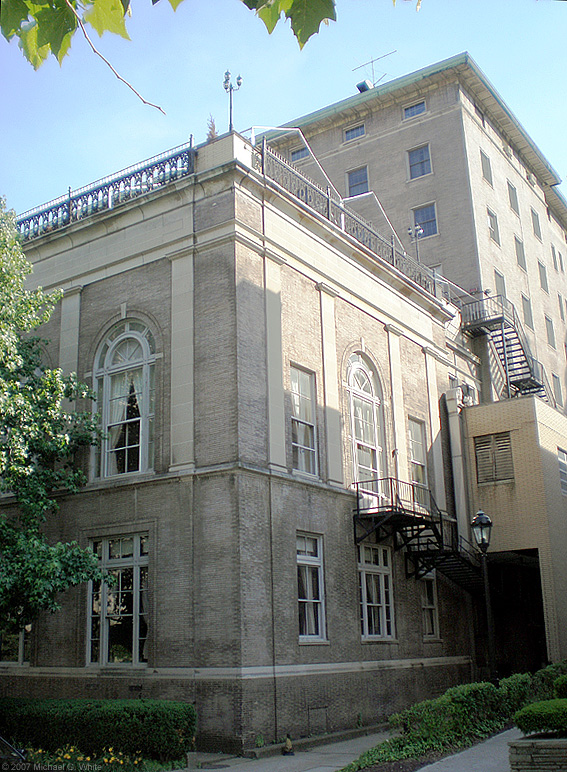
The University Club, now a building on Pitt's campus

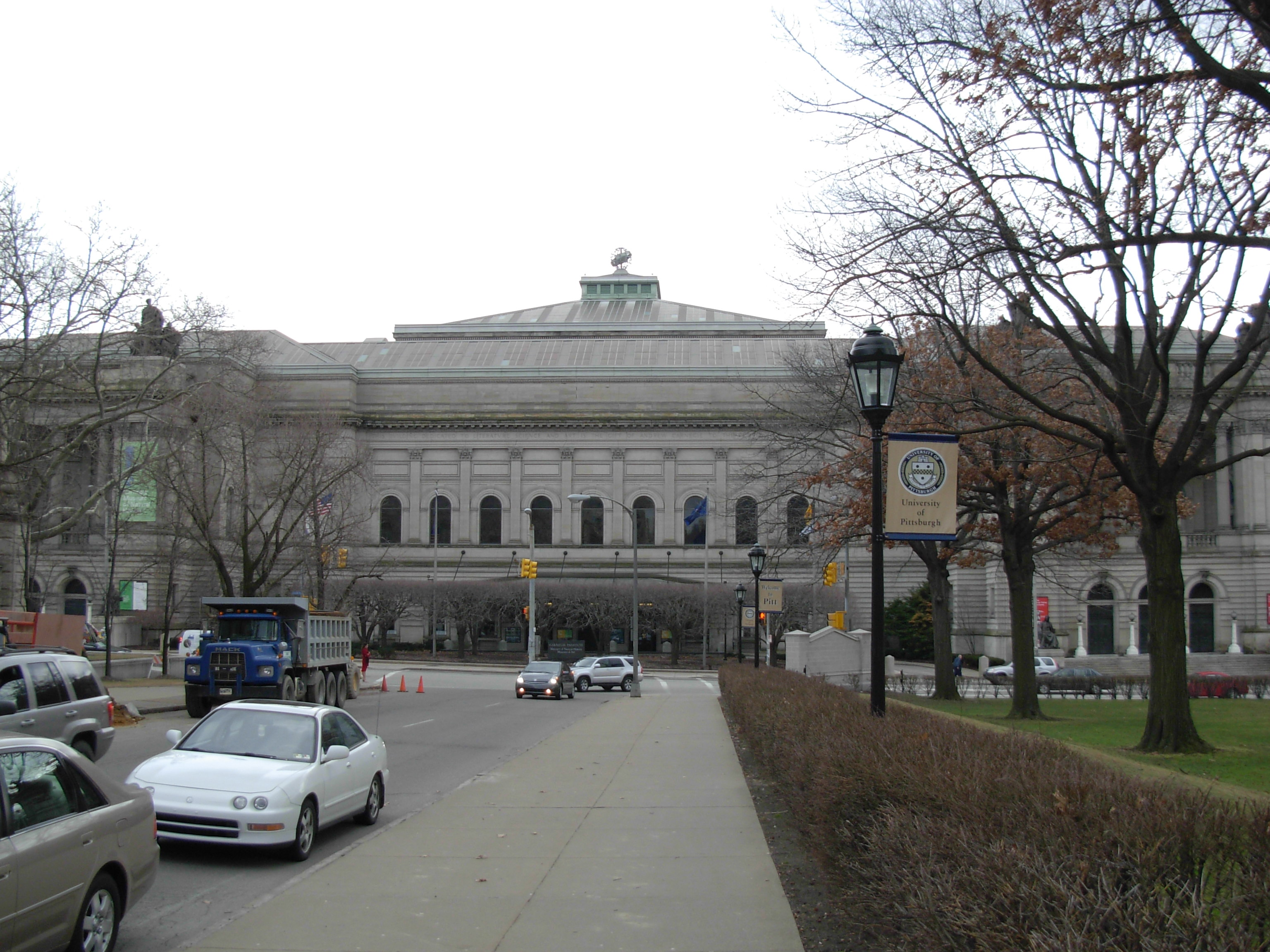
The Carnegie Institute

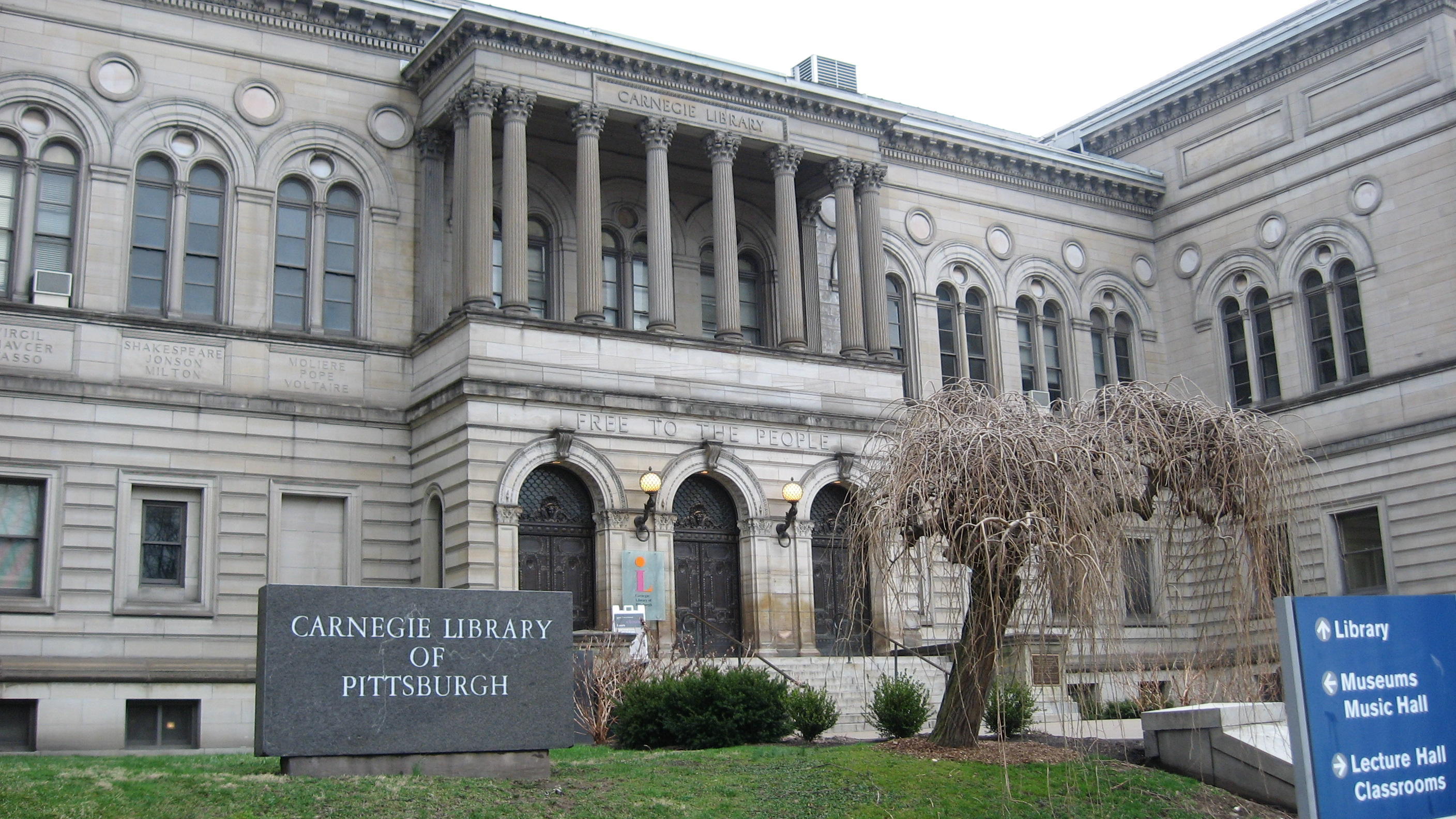
The Carnegie Library of Pittsburgh, part of the Carnegie Institute complex

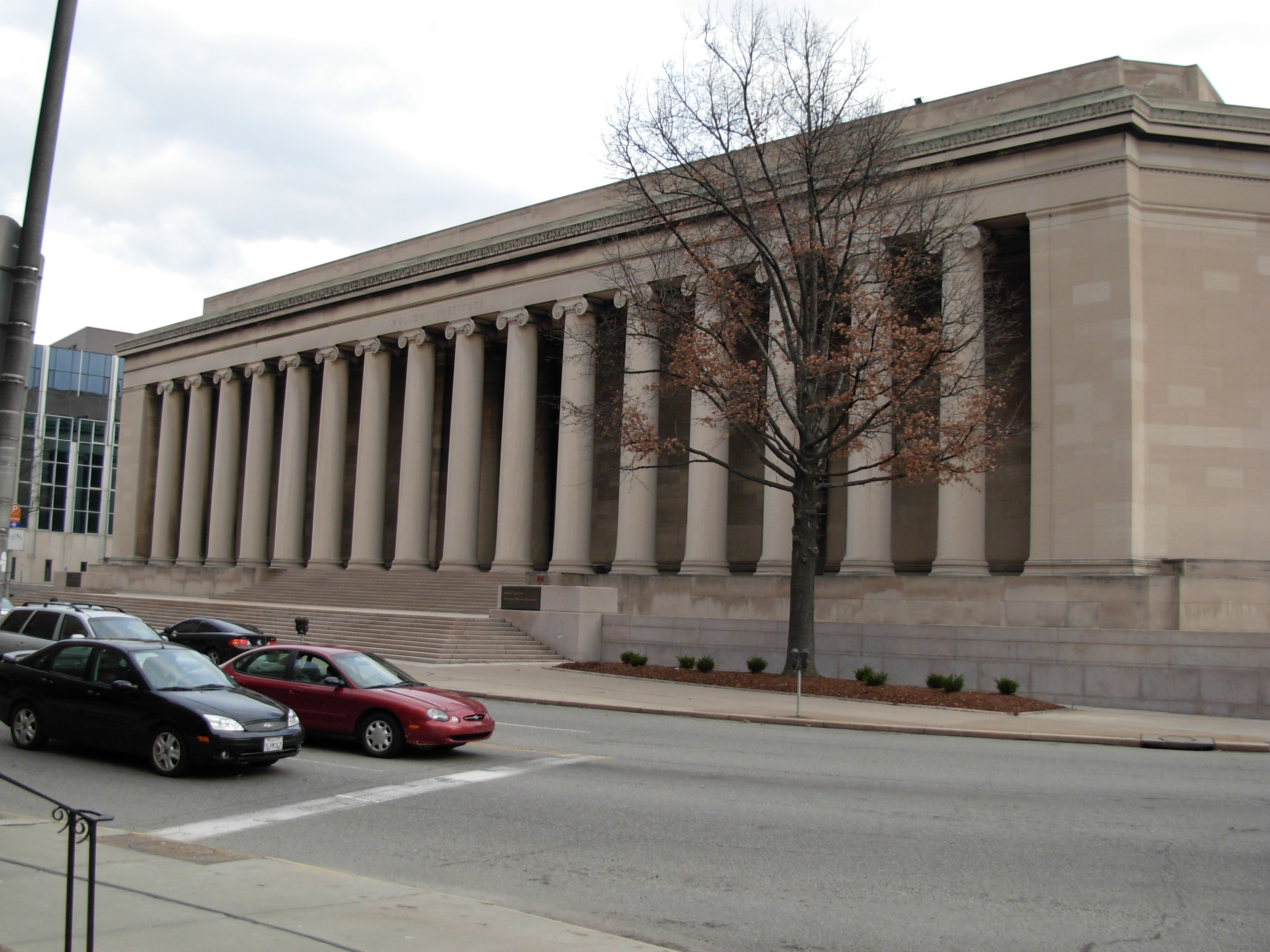
Mellon Institute

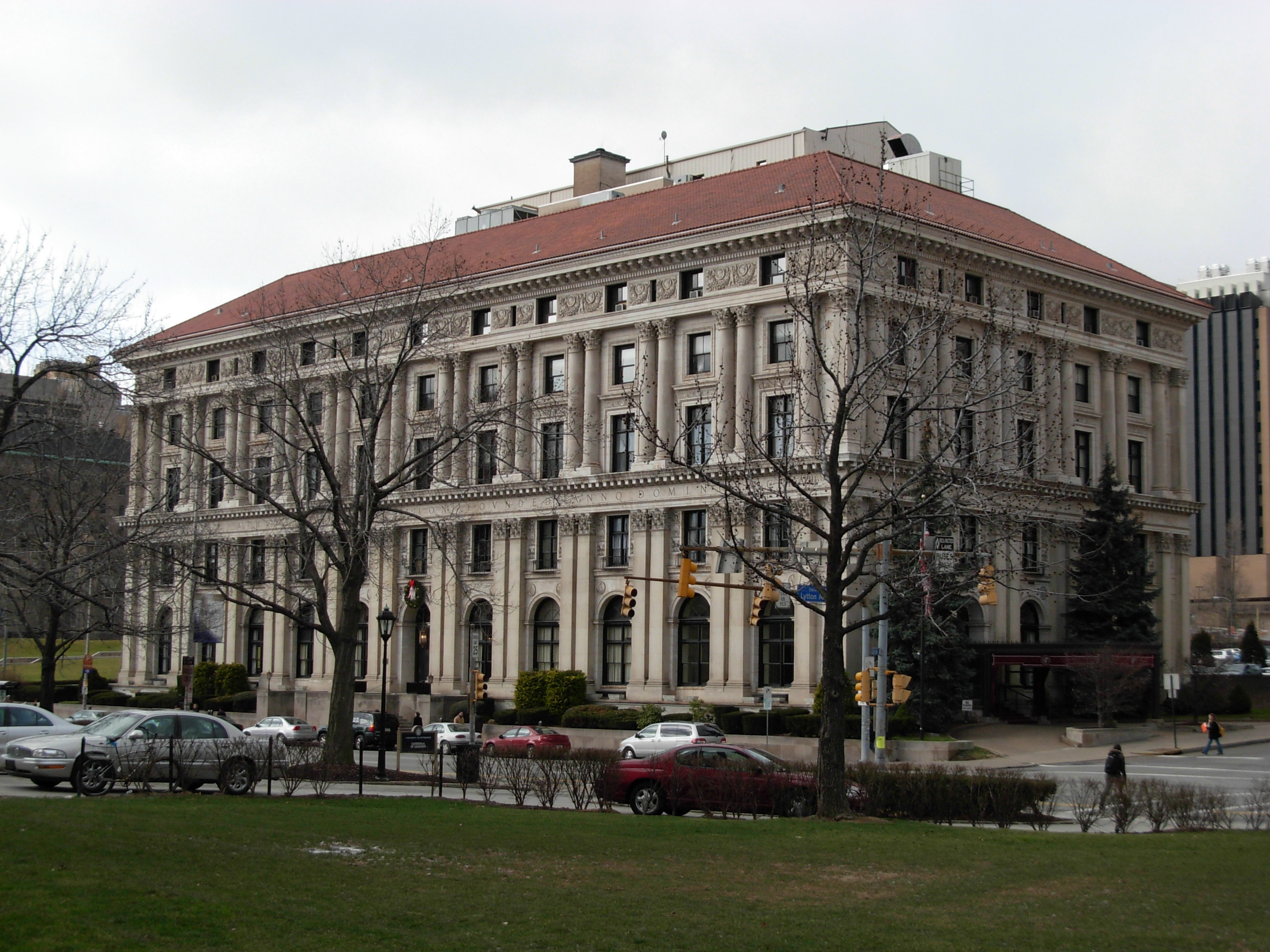
Pittsburgh Athletic Association

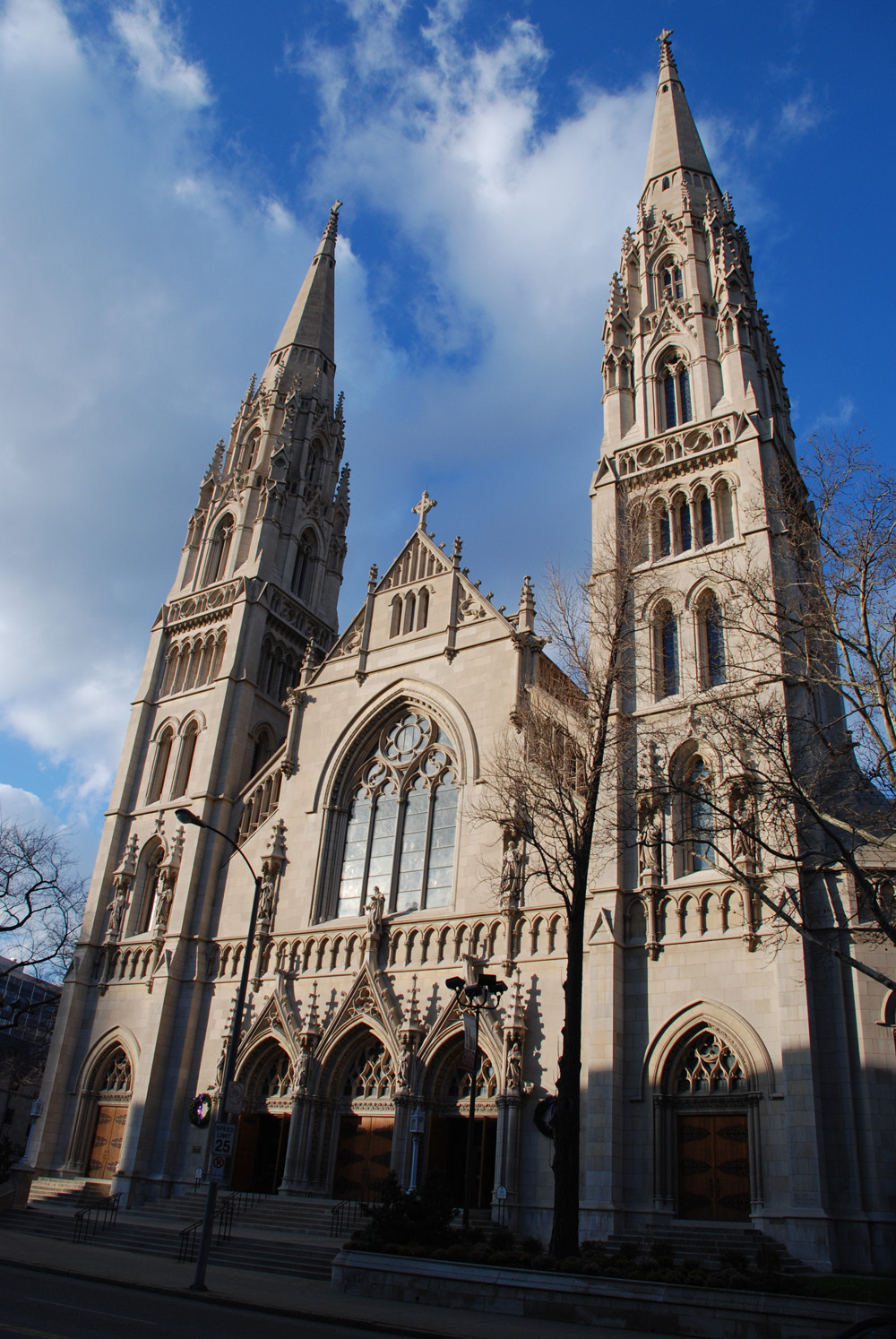
St. Paul's Cathedral

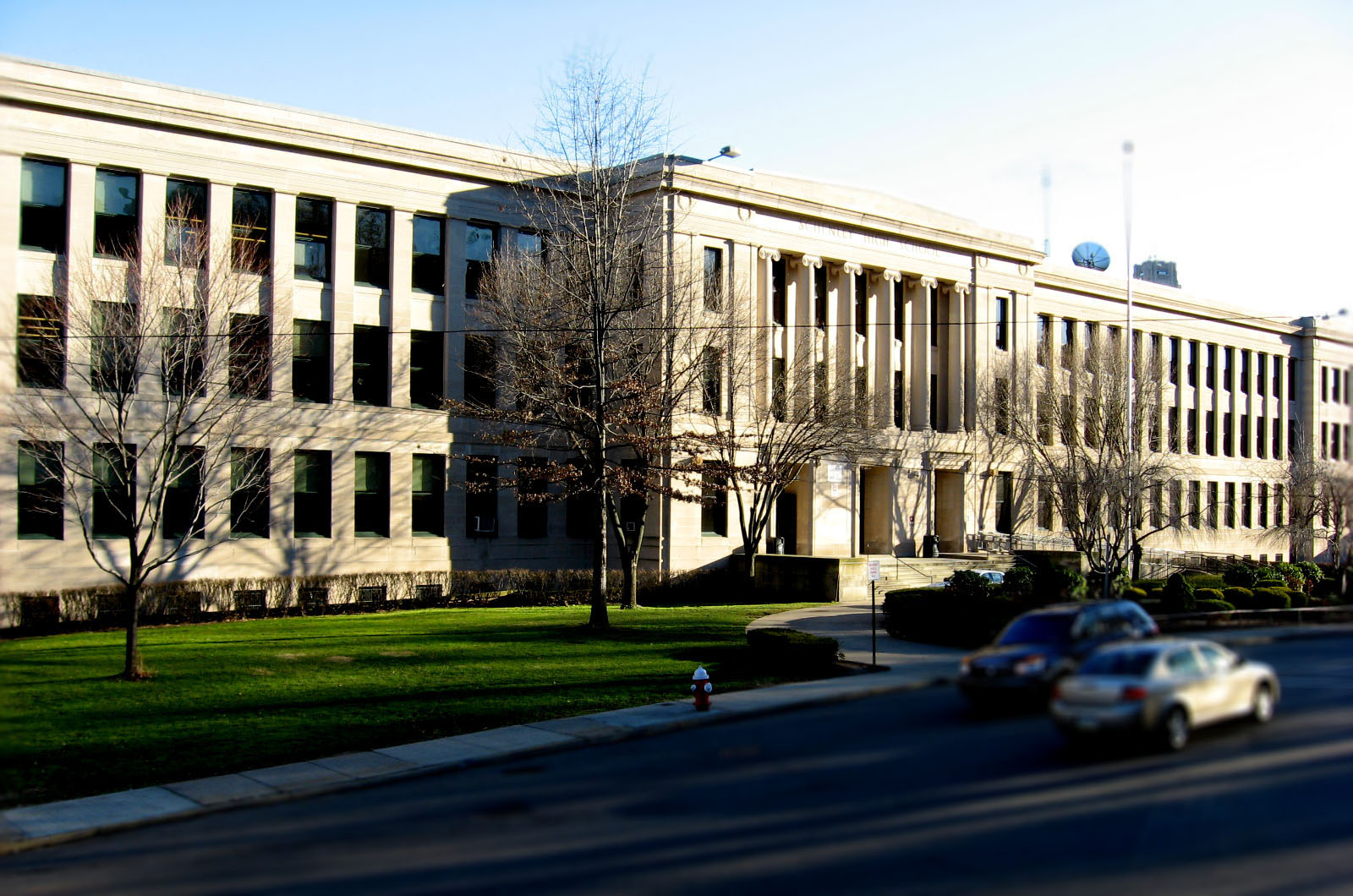
The former Schenley High School which closed in 2008.

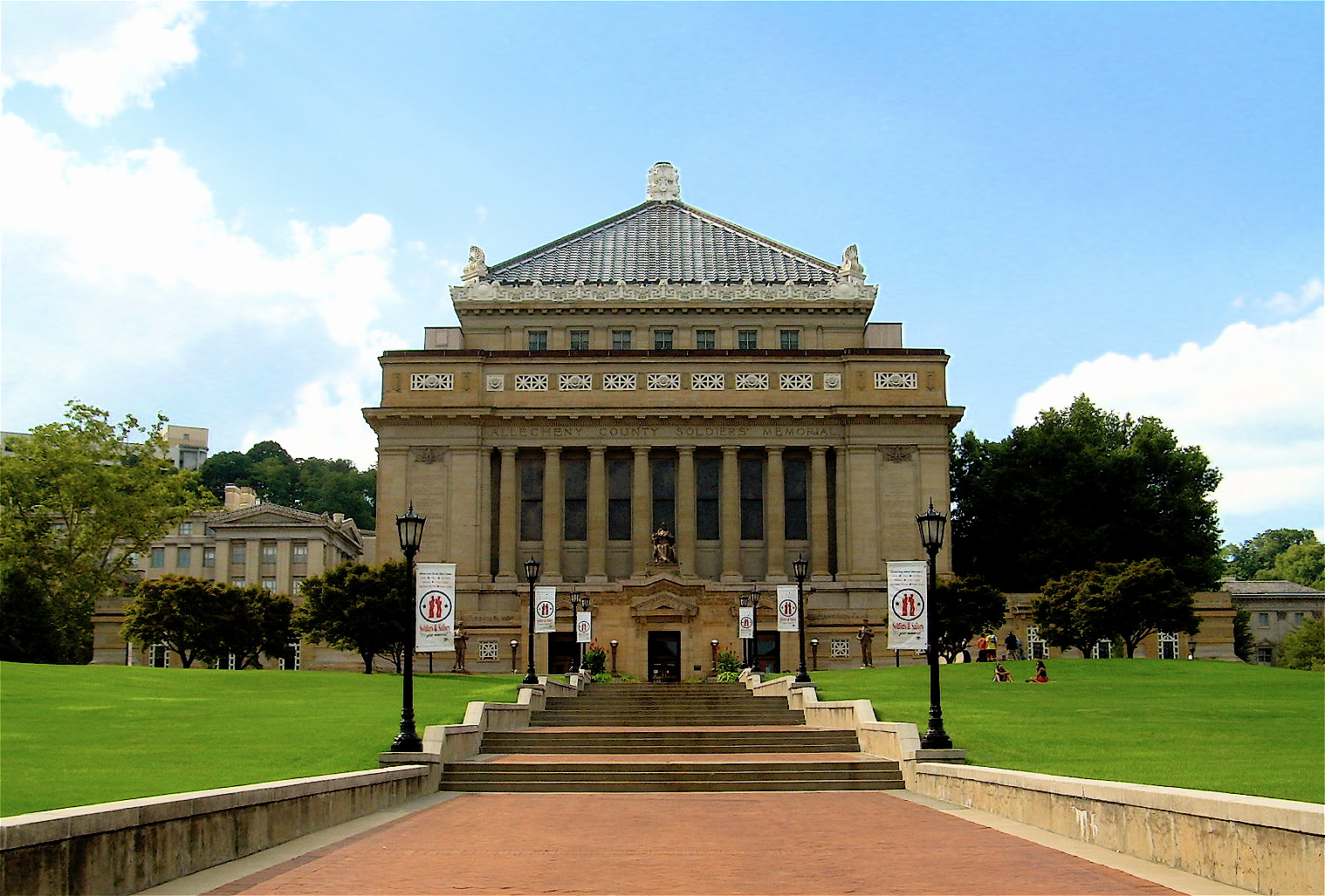
Soldiers and Sailors Memorial Hall

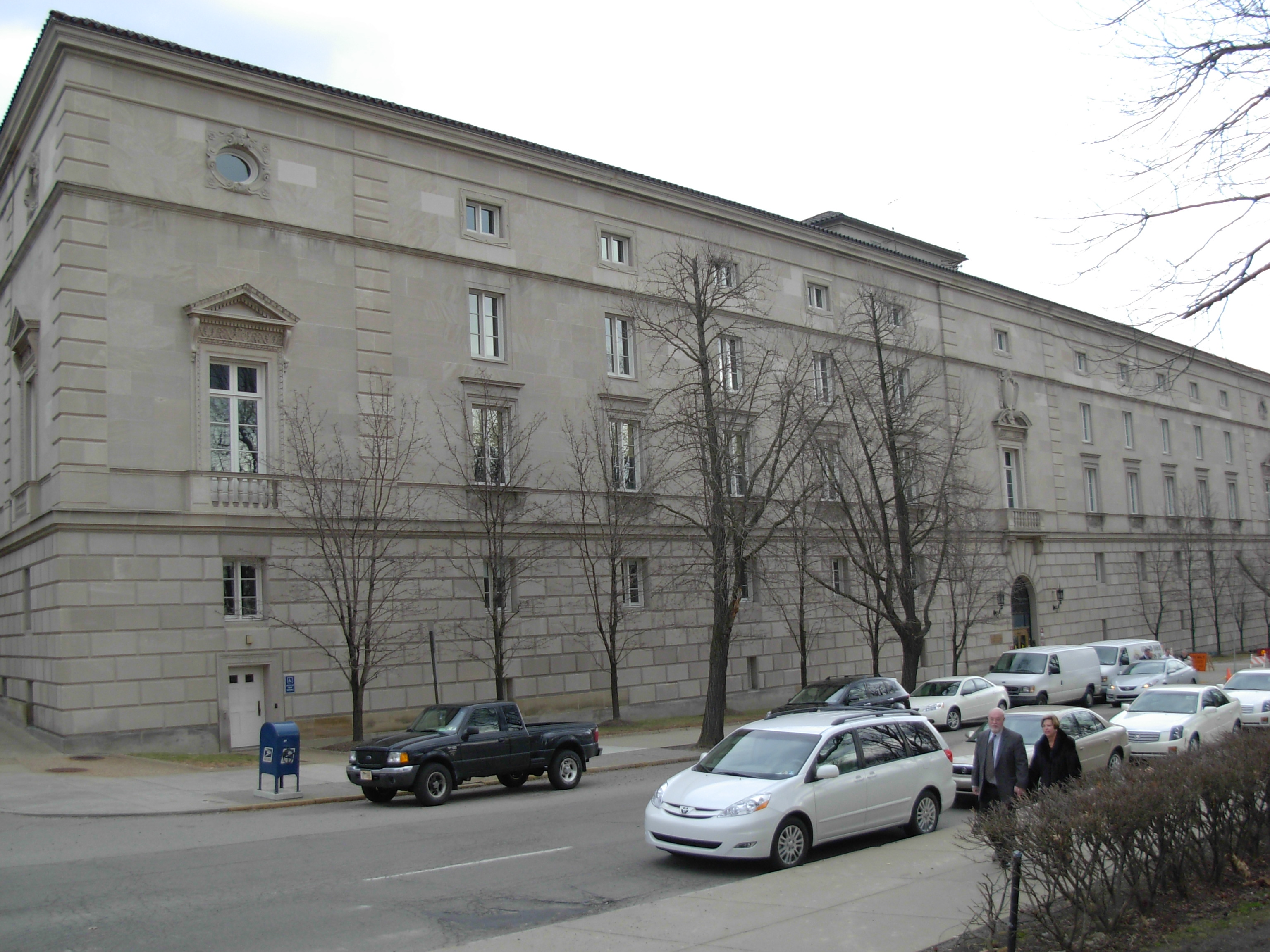
Pittsburgh Public School's Board of Education building

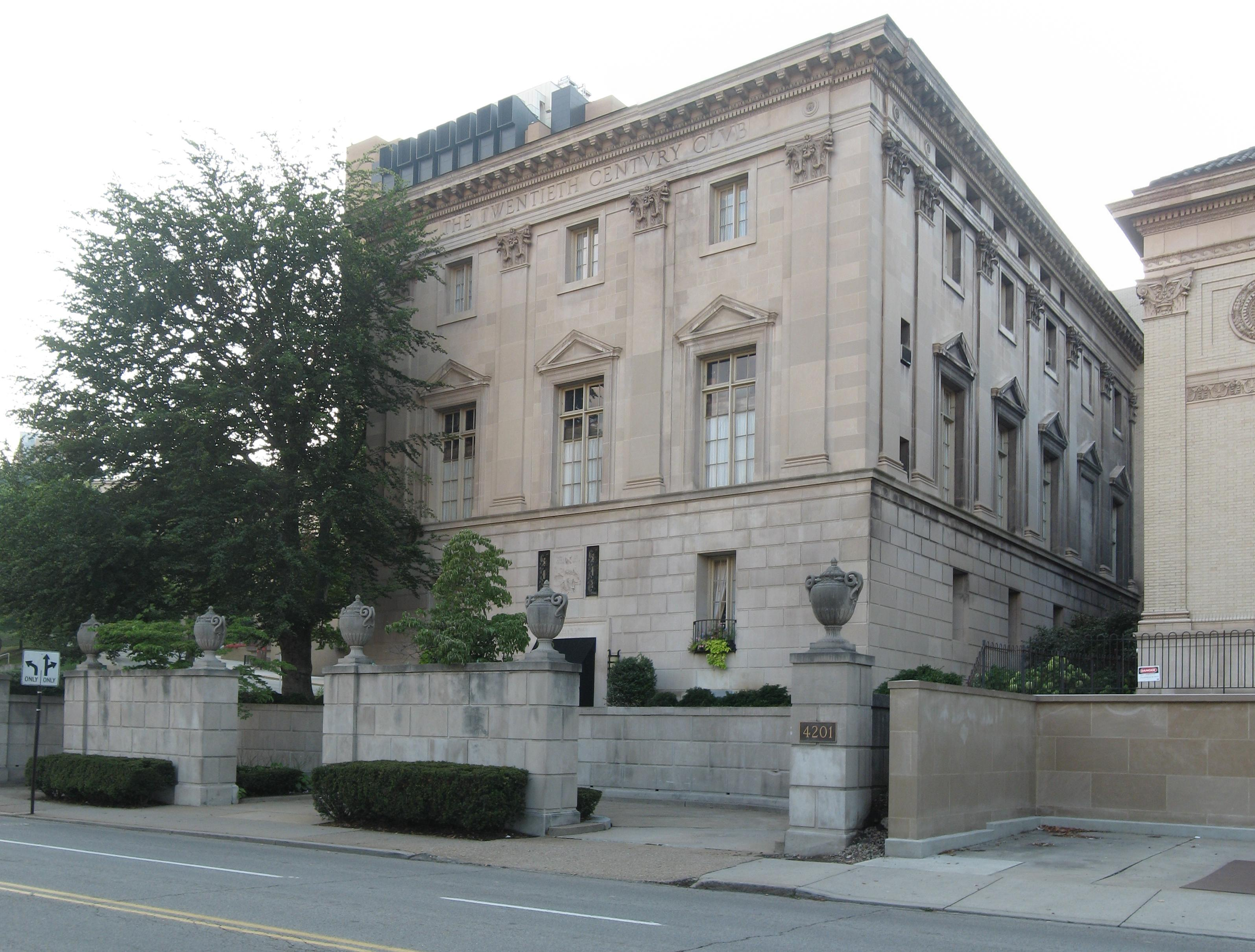
The Twentieth Century Club, now a building of the University of Pittsburgh

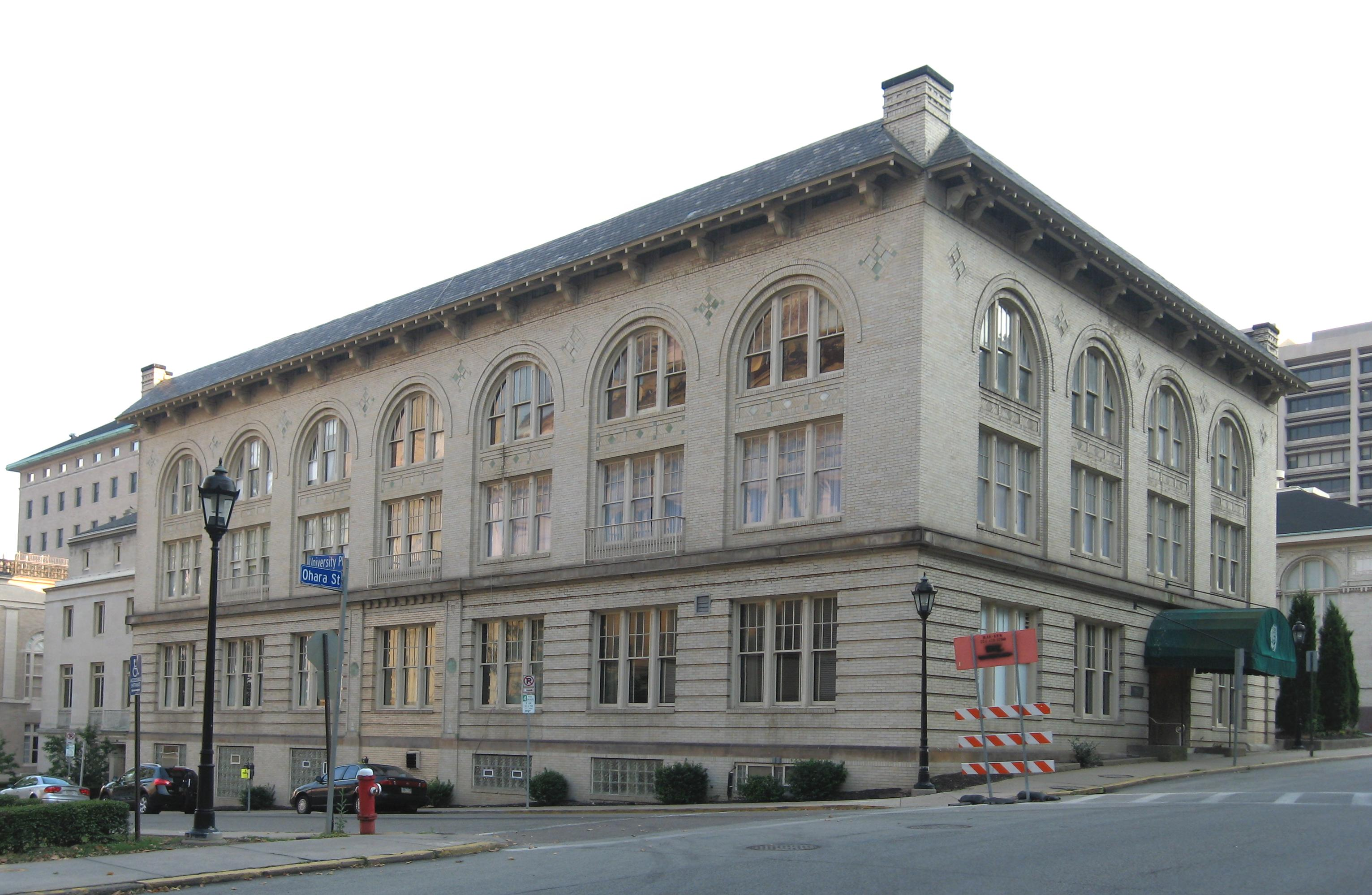
O'Hara Student Center

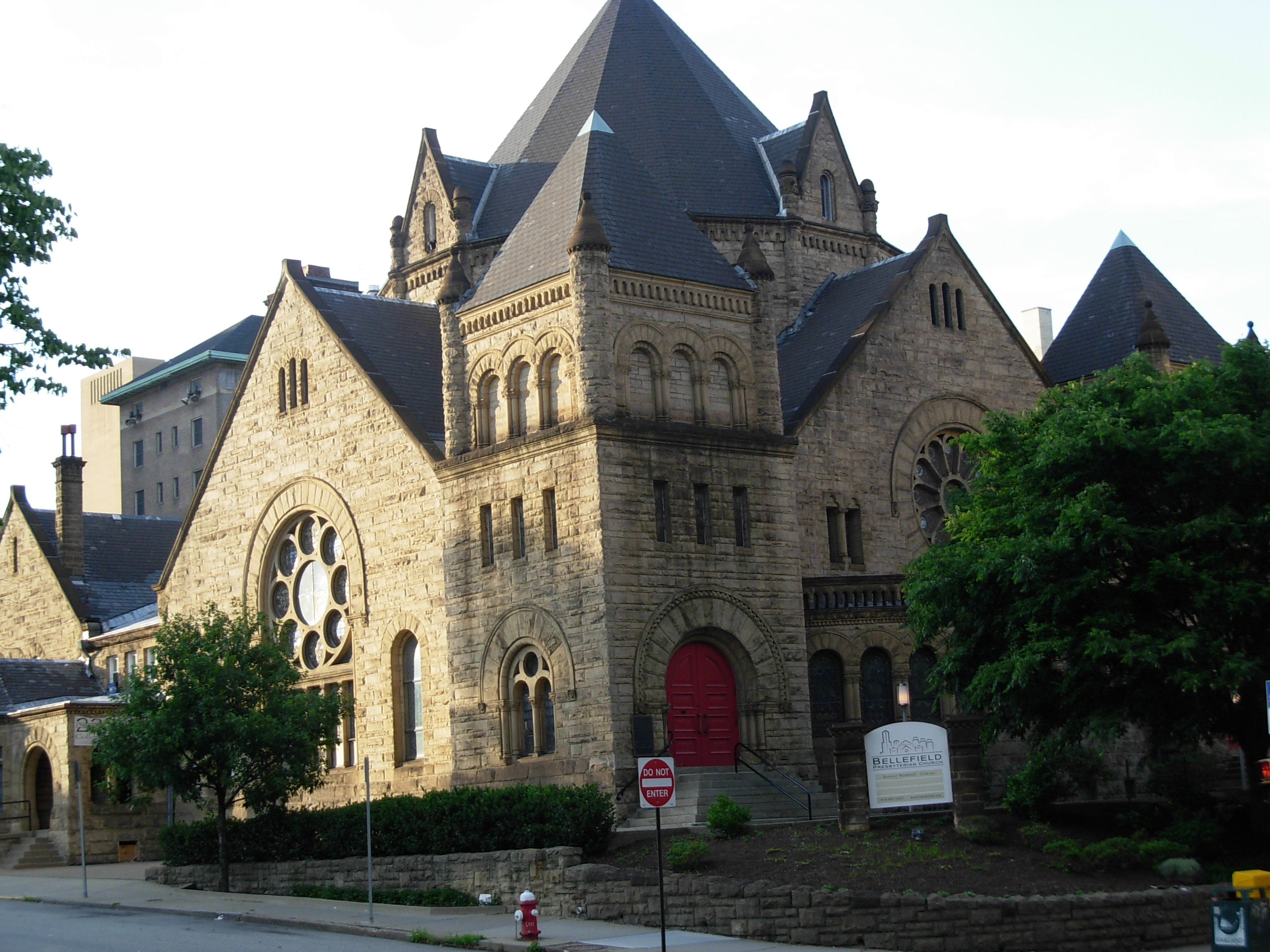
Bellefield Presbyterian Church

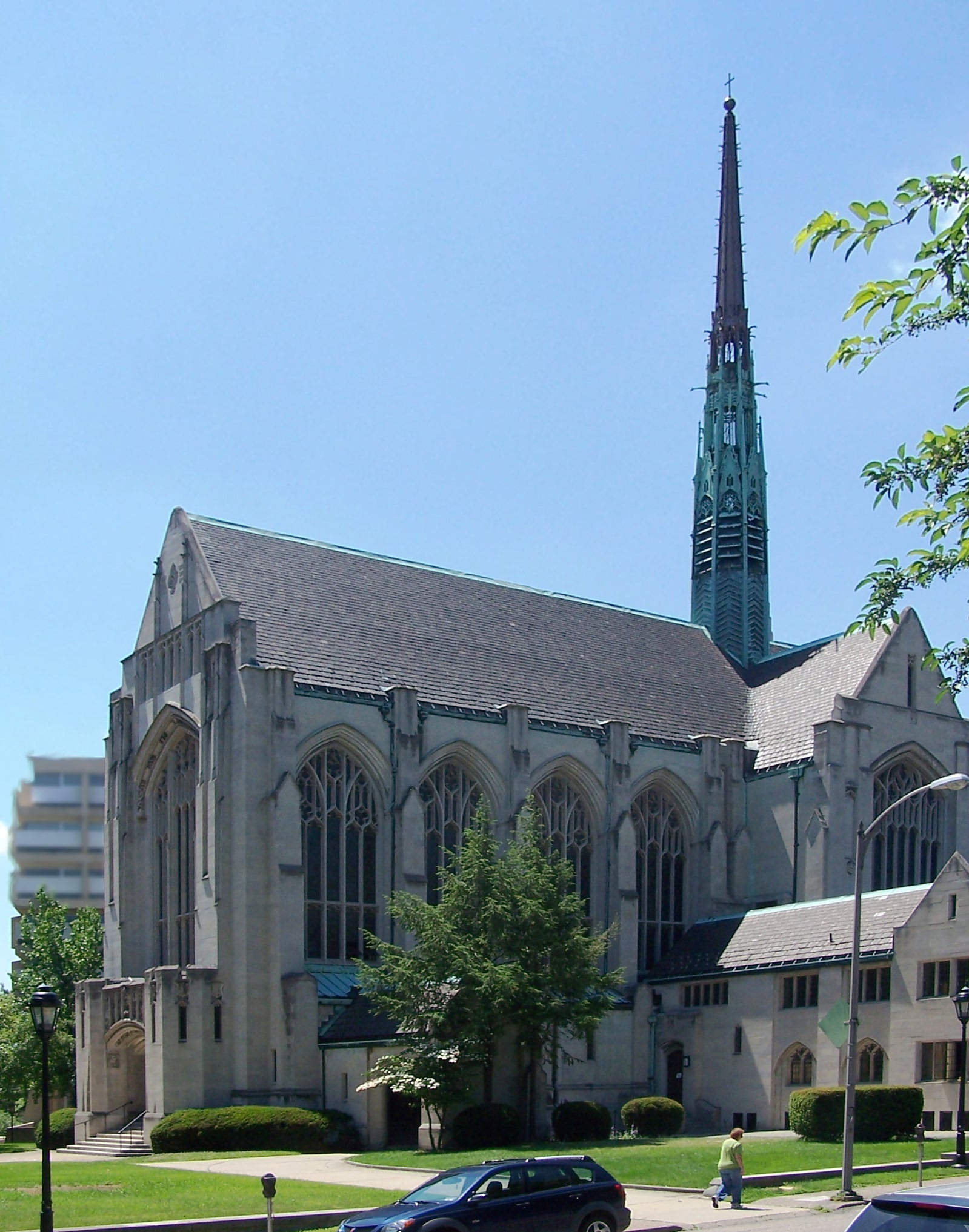
First Baptist Church

== Book References ==
- Aurand, Martin (2006). The Spectator and the Topographical City. Pittsburgh: University of Pittsburgh Press. ISBN 0-8229-4288-7.
- Bails, Jennifer (Spring 2008). "Schenley Farms: This Grand Old Neighborhood Began as a Model Urban Suburb". Shady Ave. 12 (2). Pittsburgh: Shady Ave Media: 38–44.
