= Log Cabin (University of Pittsburgh) =

Historic building in Pennsylvania, US

Coordinates: 40.443890°N 79.951980°W

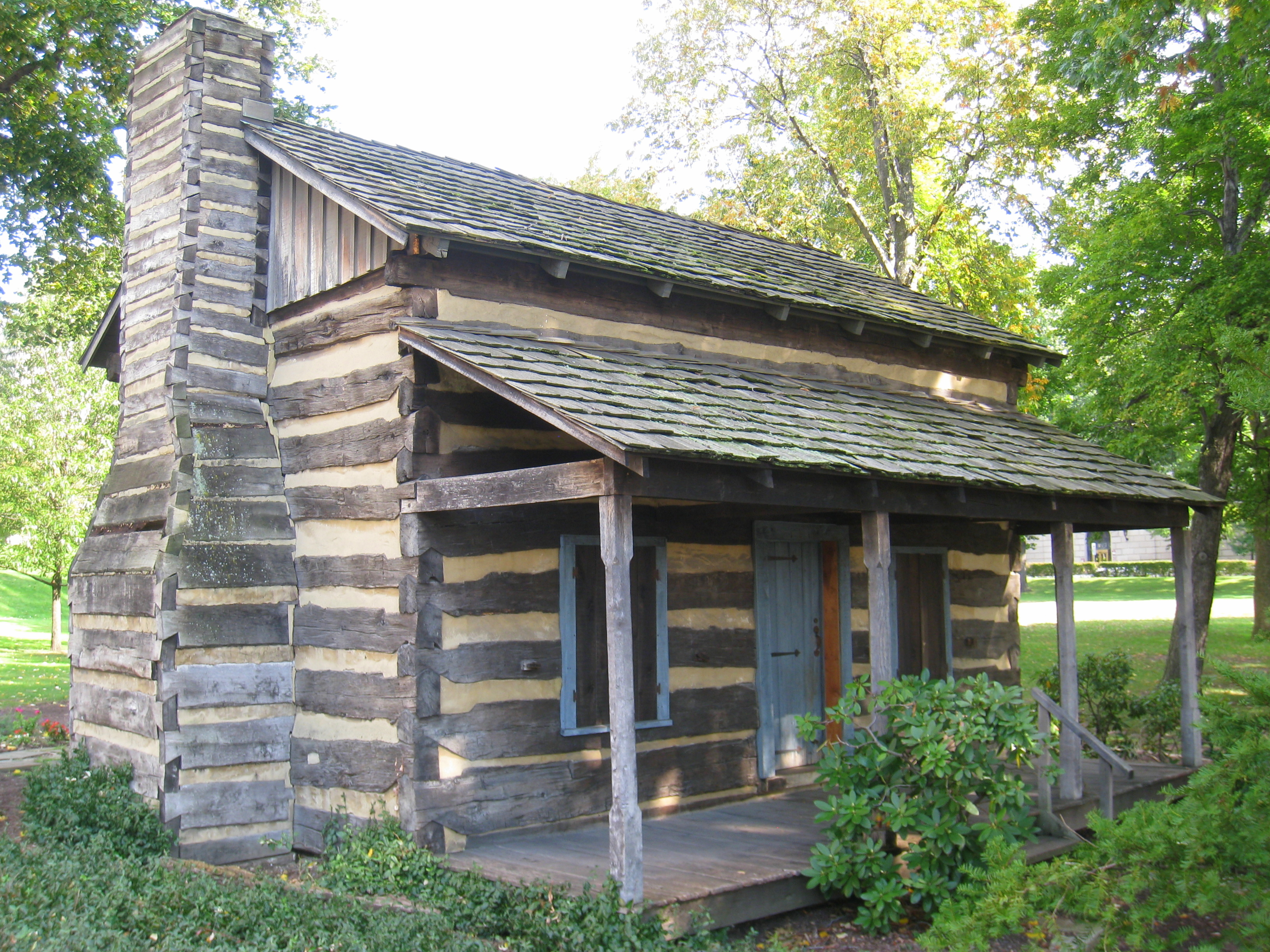
This log cabin from the 1800s was placed on the grounds of the Cathedral of Learning to celebrate Pitt's bicentennial and log cabin origins.

The Log Cabin at the University of Pittsburgh, located near Forbes Avenue, in Pittsburgh, Pennsylvania adjacent to the school's Cathedral of Learning, serves as a landmark that symbolizes the university's origins on the 18th Century western frontier of the early United States. The current log cabin, estimated to date from the 1820s to 1830s, was reconstructed on the university's campus for its bicentennial celebration in order to represent Pitt's original log structure that served the institution through the school's founding in 1787 to the construction of a brick building sometime in the 1790s. The Log Cabin often appears in images and promotional material, particularly when relating to the history of the university.

== Modern history ==
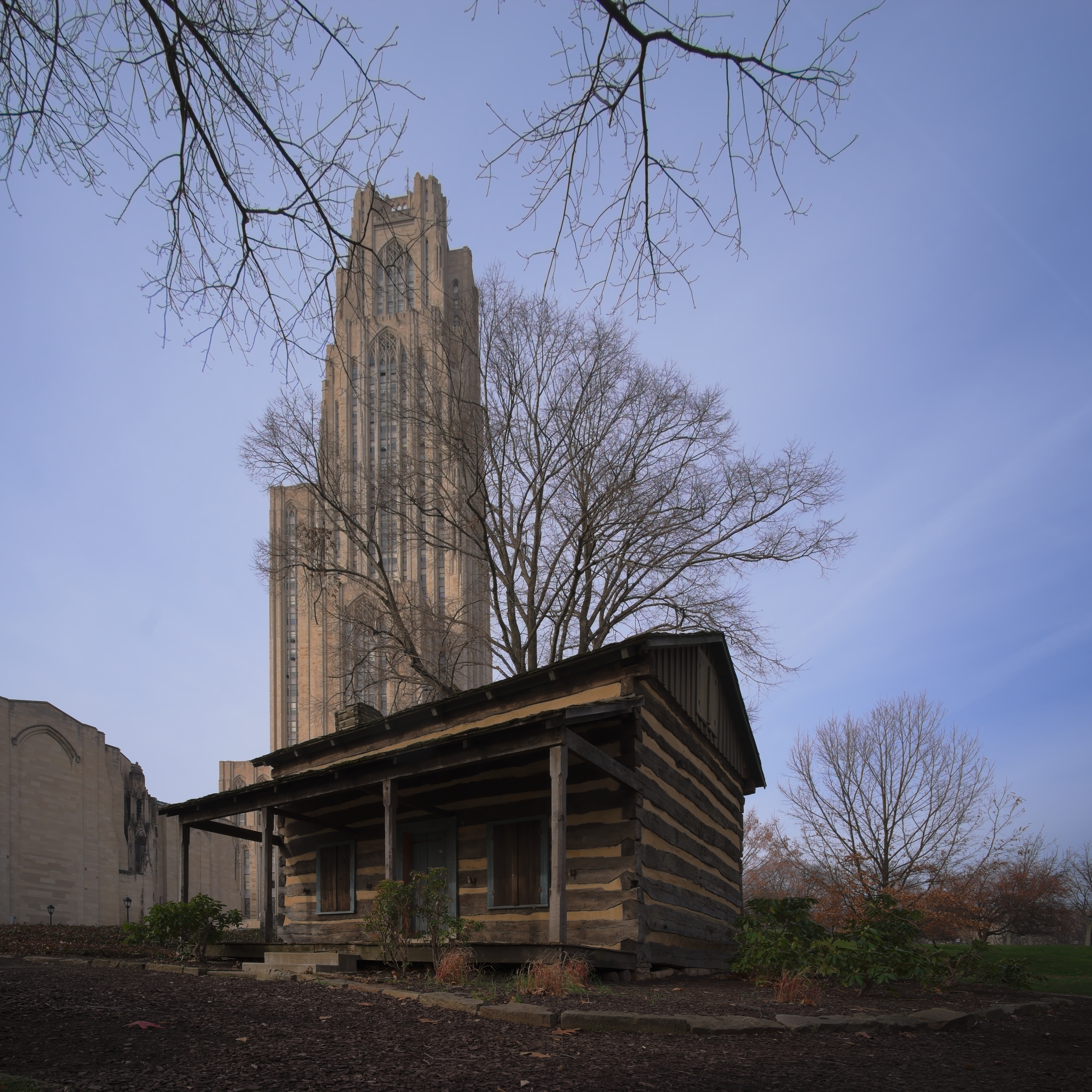
The log cabin is located on the lawn of the university's Cathedral of Learning (center background) and next to the school's Stephen Foster Memorial (background left)

The idea of placing a log cabin, which had come to symbolize the university's origins, on Pitt's campus in order to commemorate the university's approaching bicentennial in 1987, came from then Chancellor Wesley Posvar and University Trustee Charles Fagan III. This particular cabin originated from Yatesboro/Rural Valley area of Pennsylvania located about 50 miles from Pittsburgh. Estimated to date from the 1820s to 1830s, the log house had been sided with clapboards and used as a residence. It was purchased at an auction for $1,000 by Fagan, who donated it to the university in honor of his wife Ann Ebbert Fagan, who graduated from the university's School of Arts and Sciences in 1962. The cabin was disassembled and transported to Pittsburgh where its reconstruction was begun on September 10, 1986. Brad Moody of Heritage Restorations of Ligonier, Pennsylvania was the contractor for the disassembly and reassembly. The building's porch and chimney are new conjectural additions based on Heritage Restorations' expertise with similar buildings. Additionally, some original logs were replaced with the company's stockpiles, and a new wood shingle roof was installed, along with newly fabricated doors and windows. For a time after its completion, through at least part of the 1990s, the log cabin served as a visitors' information center. It is currently used by the Cathedral of Learning grounds maintenance staff to store salt for winter deicing.

== Symbolism, history, and legend ==
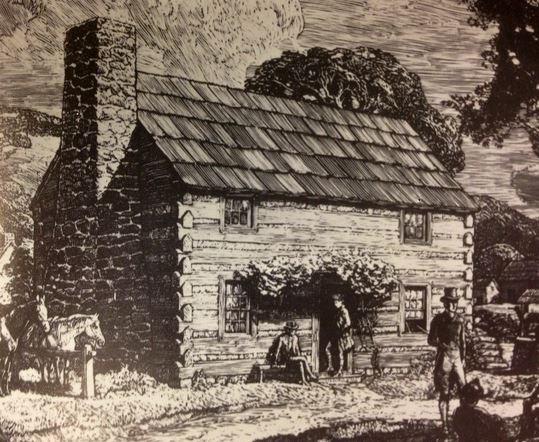
Artist rendering of the original log cabin of the Pittsburgh Academy

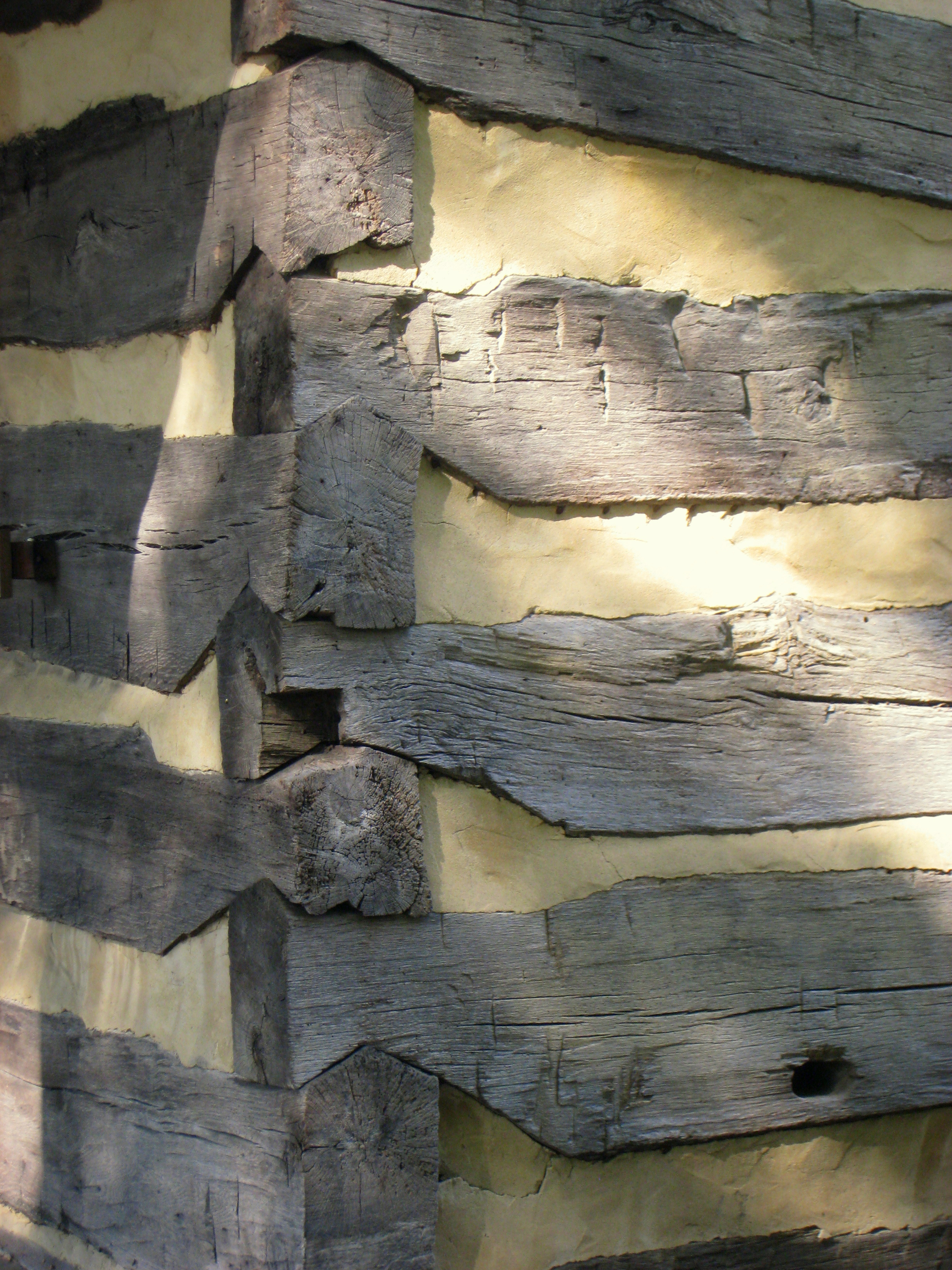
Details of one of the cabin's corner joints

Tradition of the university, then the Pittsburgh Academy in the 1780s, and scattered evidence suggests that the school began life in a log cabin. A lack of concrete information of Pitt's early days can be blamed on the 1845 Great Fire of Pittsburgh that wiped out most of Downtown Pittsburgh, where the school was then located, as well as a fire that occurred on its campus in 1849. For this reason, very few records about Pitt's early days exist, and definitive information on classes being held in a log cabin is scarce. Records do exist of a gathering of individuals discussing the need for a new school, which was to become Pittsburgh Academy, occurring in a log house near the Point (this meeting was known to take place but the records from the meeting were lost). According to Pitt historian Agnes Lynch Starrett, there is "plenty of evidence that classes were held in a log building, even before the charter was granted". Most structures in 1787 Pittsburgh, then the frontier of America, were wooden structures or log cabins. Further, it appears other schools in the area, such as Washington and Jefferson College whose first building was known to be John McMillan's Log School, also operated out of similar structures. In the 1790s, a two-story, three-room, brick building was erected for Pitt Academy on the south side of Third Street and Cherry Alley. It is also known, that the school owned both its brick building and a log house next to it that served as the home to its principal. It seems in the very least that it can be inferred that Pitt Academy had an early log building in its possession. Even if the history of the school starting in a log cabin is factually unclear, it has been a tradition told within the university for over 100 years and at least represents the era of Pitt's founding, if not the actual first meeting in a log cabin to discuss the institution's creation. Since then, the image of a log cabin has become an iconic representation of the university's origins and has appeared on numerous publications and promotional items celebrating the university's sesquicentennial, bicentennial, and other anniversaries.

| Preceded by First Building Constructed | University of Pittsburgh buildings Log Cabin; Constructed: 1820s-1830s | Succeeded by Music Building |
