= Music Building (University of Pittsburgh) =

- U.S. Historic district – Contributing property
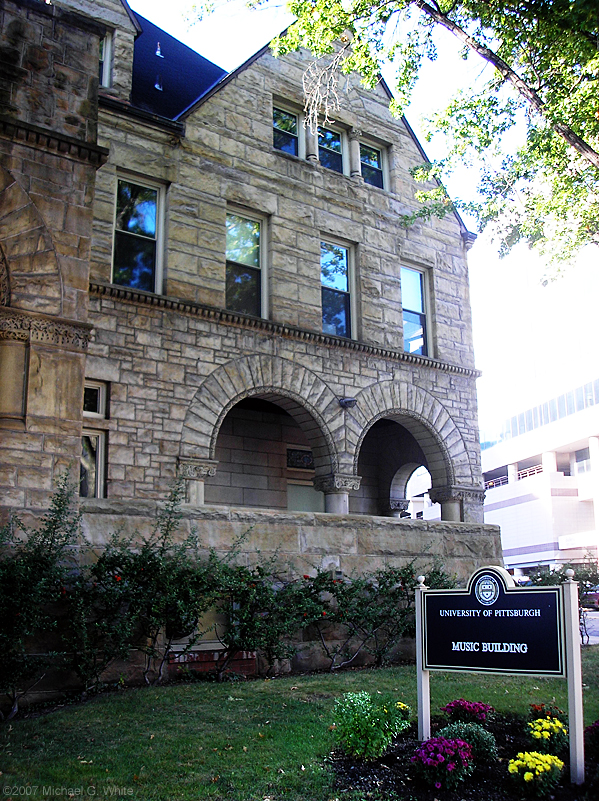
- Music Building at the University of Pittsburgh
- Coordinates: 40°26′47.88″N 79°57′7.89″W
- Built: 1884
- Architect: Longfellow, Alden & Harlow
- Architectural style: Richardsonian Romanesque
- Part of: Schenley Farms Historic District (ID83002213)
- Added to NRHP: July 22, 1983

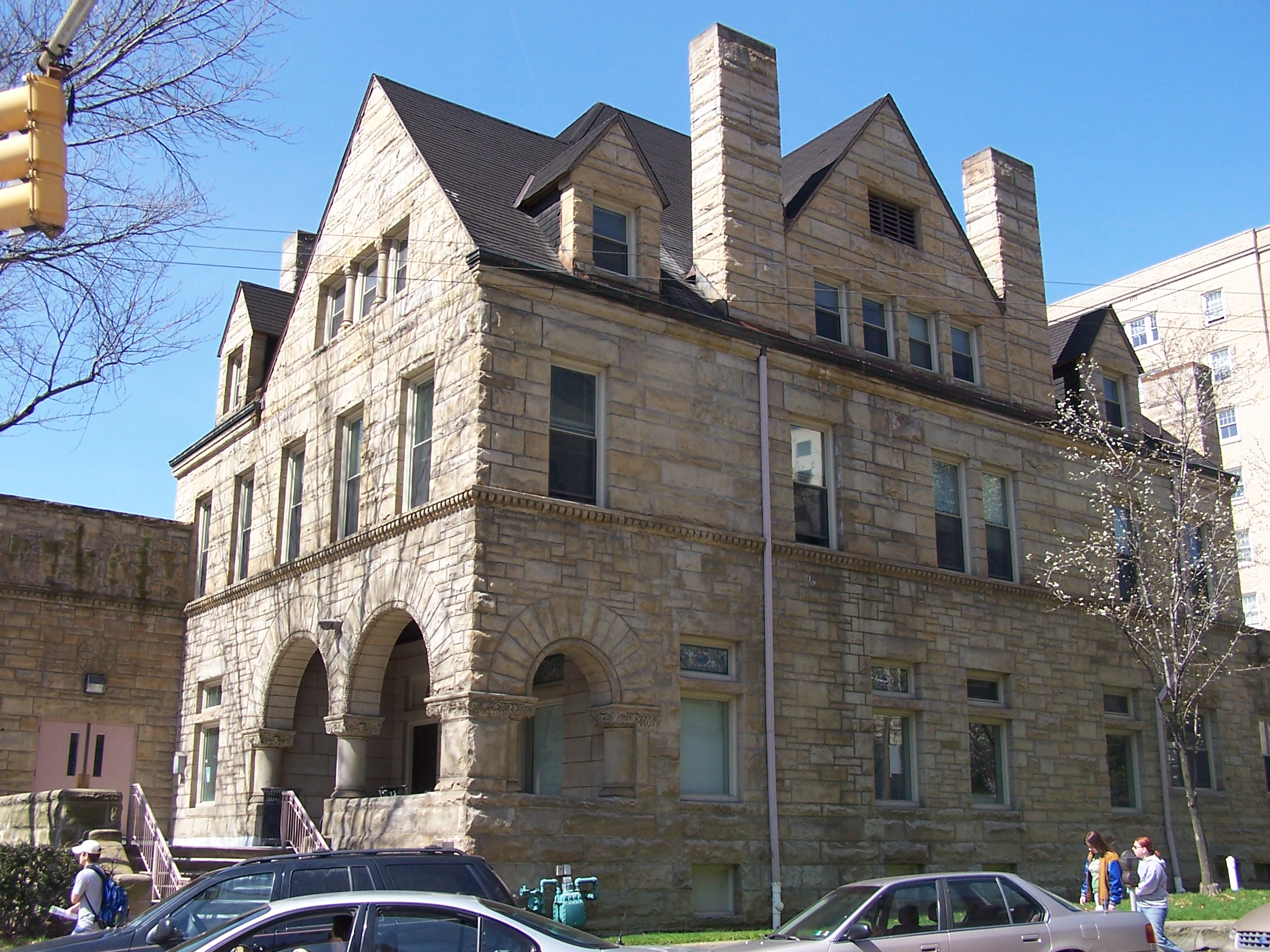
Music Building from Bellefield Avenue

The Music Building is an academic building of the University of Pittsburgh in Pittsburgh, Pennsylvania, United States, and a contributing property to the Schenley Farms National Historic District. A Longfellow, Alden & Harlow-designed mansion that was originally the home of the pastor of a neighboring church and former university chancellor, it also served as the home to a local chapter of the Knights of Columbus, as chemical laboratories, and as the first home of educational television station WQED and that station's original production site for Mister Rogers' Neighborhood. Today it is home to the University of Pittsburgh's Department of Music and the school's Theodore M. Finney Music Library.

== History ==
The original mansion was designed by Longfellow, Alden & Harlow as a sandstone Richardsonian Romanesque mansion in 1884. The mansion was commissioned by Carrie T. Holland, youngest daughter of pioneer Pittsburgh iron manufacturer James K. Moorehead, as a gift for her husband William Jacob Holland, pastor of Bellefield Presbyterian Church at Fifth and Bellefield avenues in the Oakland section of Pittsburgh. William Jacob Holland was also a nationally recognized zoologist, paleontologist, and entomologist and went on to become a trustee (1886) and then chancellor (1891–1901) of the University of Pittsburgh, then called the Western University of Pennsylvania.

The Holland's house sat across the street from Holland's church, Bellefield Presbyterian, a wooden structure that was replaced by a stone Richardsonian Romanesque structure designed by Frederick J. Osterling in 1890 that matched his house. The Hollands sold their house some time before 1912. It became a Knights of Columbus club before being purchased in 1936 by Pittsburgh Plate Glass Company for laboratory operations of its subsidiary, Columbia-Southern Chemical Corporation. Pittsburgh Plate Glass donated the building to the University of Pittsburgh in 1953 in order for the university to establish it as the home for the city's first educational television station, WQED. The building therefore became the original home of the Public Broadcasting Service station, and the original production site of Mister Rogers' Neighborhood, before becoming the home of Pitt's music department.

A one-story addition was added presumably in the 1920s which was given a Richardsonian Romanesque stone facing, estimated to have been added in the 1950s, that matched the original house. The university's Department of Music moved into the building in 1971 from its previous quarters on the ninth floor of the Cathedral of Learning. The Music Building was renovated in 2003 which included the installation of elevators. It also houses the Music Department Library, a piano lab, the electronic music studio, the ethnomusicology lab, a student/faculty lounge, practice rooms, teaching studios, offices, seminar rooms, and classrooms.

In 1967, the Bellefield Presbyterian Church merged with and moved to the First United Presbyterian Church at Fifth and Thackeray, which adopted its name. The old church was dismantled in 1985 except for its tower, which still stands.

== Library ==
Music Building at the University of Pittsburgh. Ruskin Hall can be seen behind the building on the left.

The Theodore M. Finney Music Library is located in the basement of the Music Building and contains a general music research collection as well as several collections of important musical materials. The library is named for the former head of the music department who donated his personal collection to the school. The library's holdings include approximately 65,000 music scores and books, 25,000 sound recordings, 1,500 microforms, and 150 journals. Collections include Early American hymnals and tunebooks, volumes of sheet music with regional significance, seventeenth and eighteenth century prints of English sacred and secular works, and music belonging to the late William Steinberg and Fidelis Zitterbart.

Preceded by Log Cabin	University of Pittsburgh buildings Music Building; Constructed: 1884	Succeeded by Chancellor's Residence
