= Ruskin Hall =

- U.S. Historic district – Contributing property
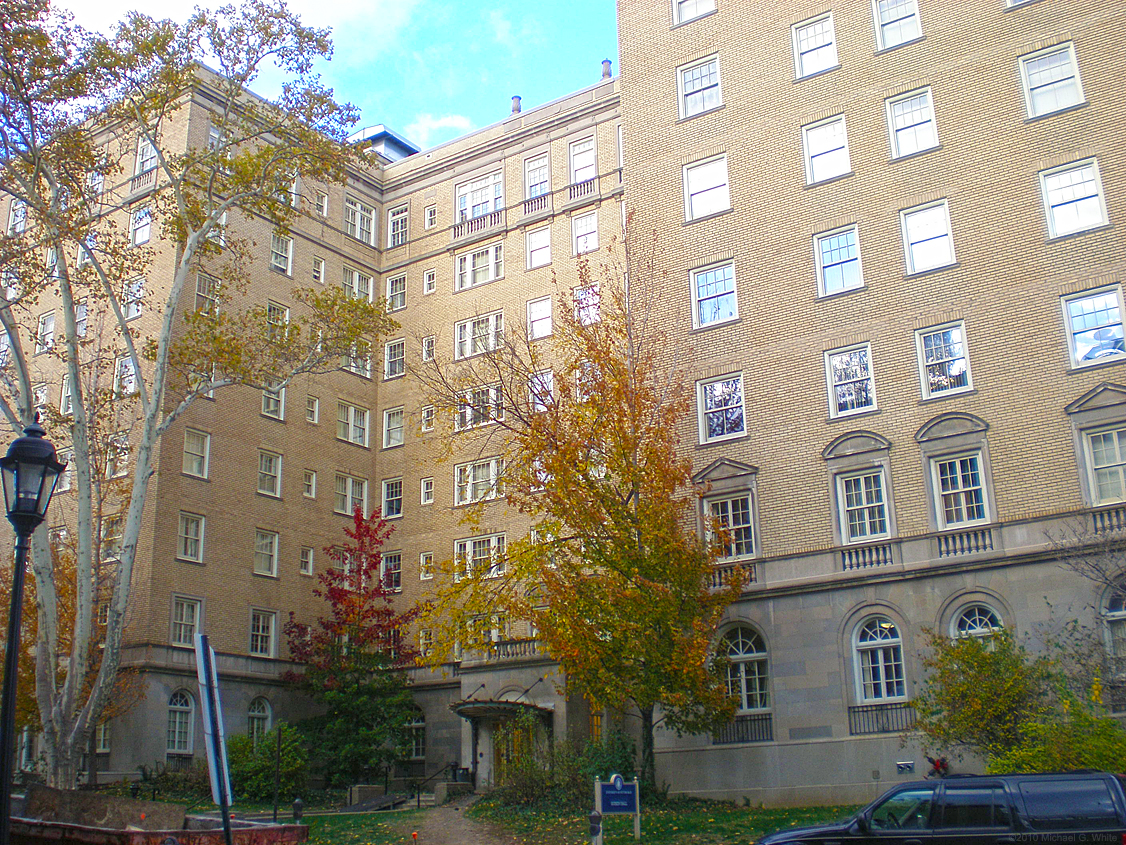
- Ruskin Hall at the University of Pittsburgh
- Coordinates: 40°26′48.83″N 79°57′10.63″W
- Built: 1923
- Architect: H. L. Stevens & Company
- Part of: Schenley Farms Historic District (ID83002213)
- Added to NRHP: July 22, 1983

Ruskin Hall is a residence hall at the University of Pittsburgh and a contributing property to the Schenley Farms National Historic District. Constructed in 1921–22 by H. L. Stevens & Company, with an annex added in 1925–26, it is an eight-story building which is located between the Music Building and Information Sciences Building between Ruskin and Bellefield Avenues near Fifth Avenue on Pitt's main campus in the Oakland neighborhood of Pittsburgh, Pennsylvania. Ruskin Hall recently underwent a $19.4 million conversion and renovation from medical student housing into undergraduate apartment-style housing that opened in 2008.

== History ==
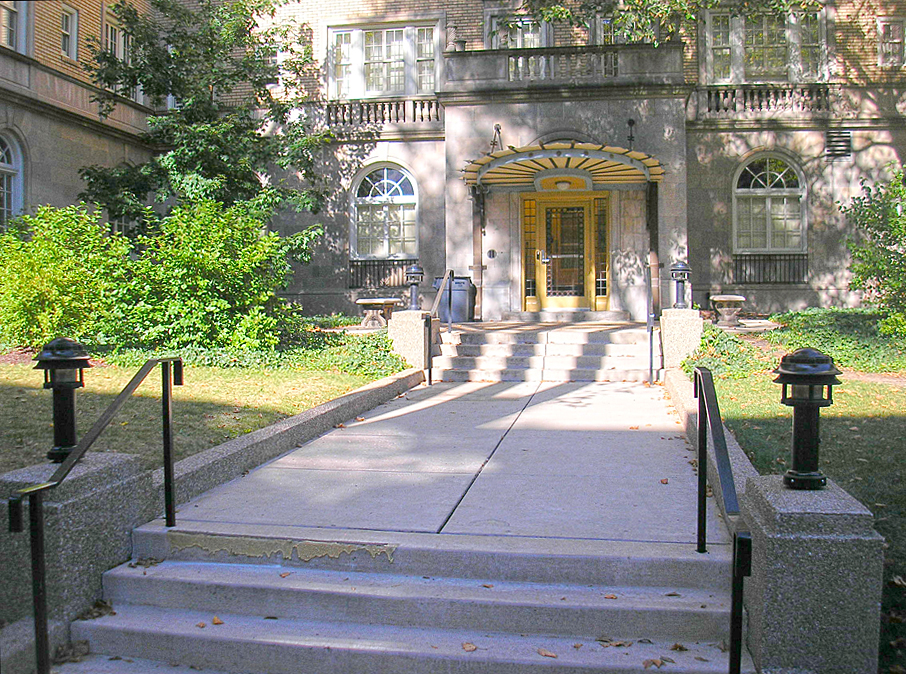
Main entrance to Ruskin Hall

Originally built in 1921–22 by H. L. Stevens & Company as the Ruskin Apartments, an annex facing Bellefield Avenue was added in 1925–26. The building has long seen usage by Pitt students, including use as the meeting place of the Omega Delta fraternity until the fall of 1926. Pitt purchased the Ruskin Apartments in February 1958 for $2.24 million ($25 million in 2025 dollars) as an investment, with the intention of using it eventually for faculty residences. Following the purchase, Pitt Chancellor Edward Litchfield held a tea for the 189 remaining tenants, many of whom were elderly, well-to-do widows, to ensure them that their leases and the staff and management would be maintained as long as they wished to stay. With time, the apartments were relinquished giving Pitt full control of the building.

In 1966, Richard King Mellon donated $1,075,475 ($10.7 million in 2025 dollars) to the university to refinance and retain possession of the Ruskin Apartments so they could be used for members of the house staffs of the university-affiliated hospitals and their families.

Ruskin Hall has also served as the home for university offices including those of the University of Pittsburgh Press. Through 2007, Ruskin Hall served as the primary residence for medical students and PhD candidates in the basic sciences of medicine, although students of other medical-related schools (including dental, nursing, and pharmacy) could be wait-listed for apartments. Beginning in the summer of 2007, medical student housing was replaced by the Darragh Street Medical Student Housing complex, allowing for a $19.4 million renovation by Graves Design Group to convert Ruskin Hall into undergraduate apartment-style housing was completed for fall 2008.

== Facilities ==
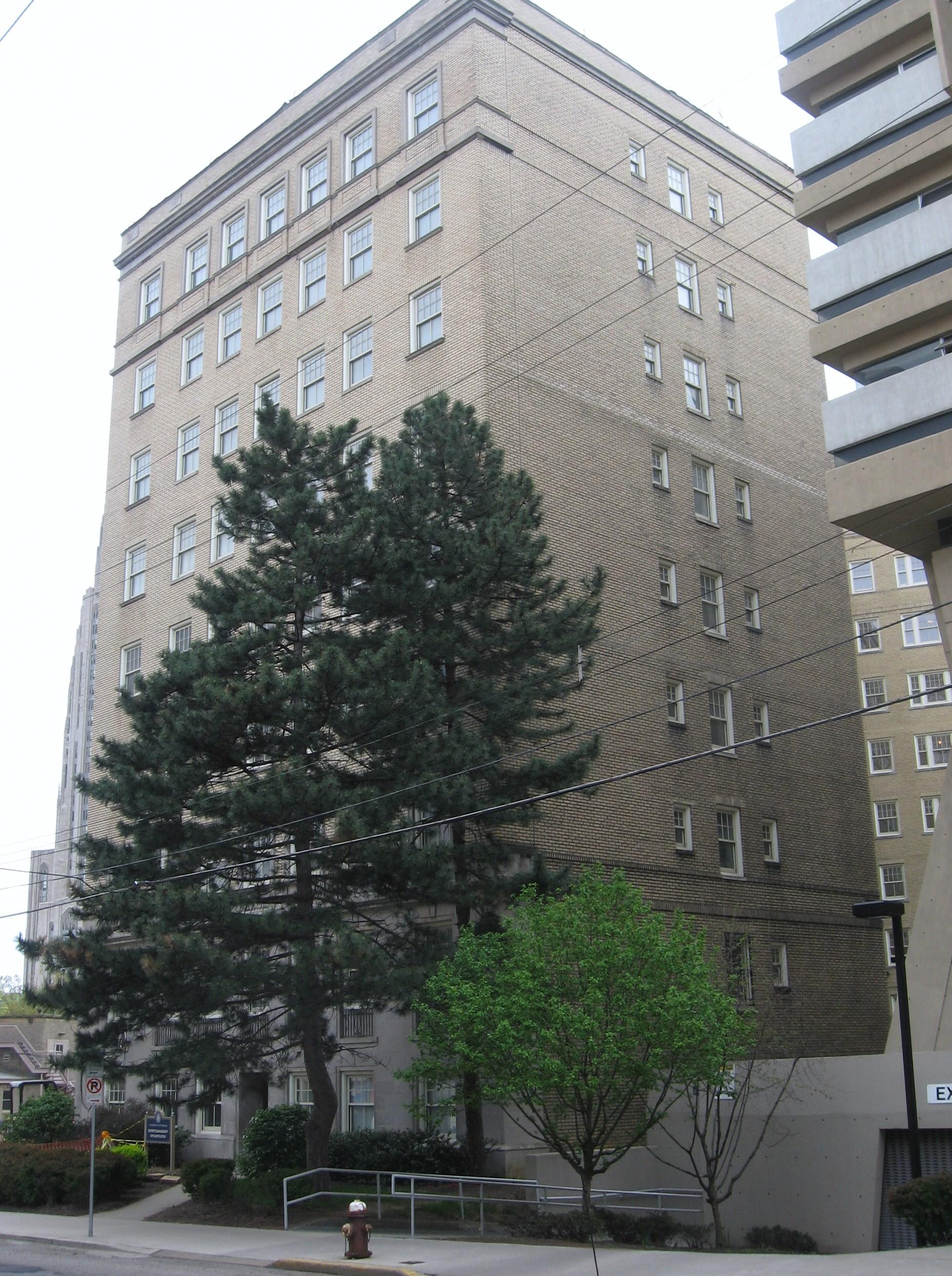
Bellefield Ave side of Ruskin Hall between the Music Building and the School of Information Sciences Building

Previously serving as a primary residence for medical students, Ruskin Hall contained 176 studio, efficiency, or one- to two-bedroom apartments each containing a living room, one to two bathrooms, and a kitchen. A ground floor study area, central courtyard, and laundry facilities were available and the building was outfitted with central air conditioning.

A $19.4 million renovation was completed in 2008 that converted the Hall into an undergraduate residence hall with 178 apartment-style units with 416 beds in one, two, and three-person apartments and single-person efficiency apartments. The furnished apartments include private baths and kitchens and have cable and internet connection. Commons areas are also equipped with wireless internet. A University of Pittsburgh Police mini-station in Ruskin Hall was also part of the renovation. In 2024, the university installed 240 solar panels on the roof of Ruskin Hall, the first solar panels installed on any of the university's residence hall rooftops.

Preceded by Eberly Hall	University of Pittsburgh buildings Ruskin Hall; Constructed: 1921-22	Succeeded by University Club
