= John Goddard Stearns Jr. =

American architect (1843–1917)

John Goddard Stearns Jr. FAIA
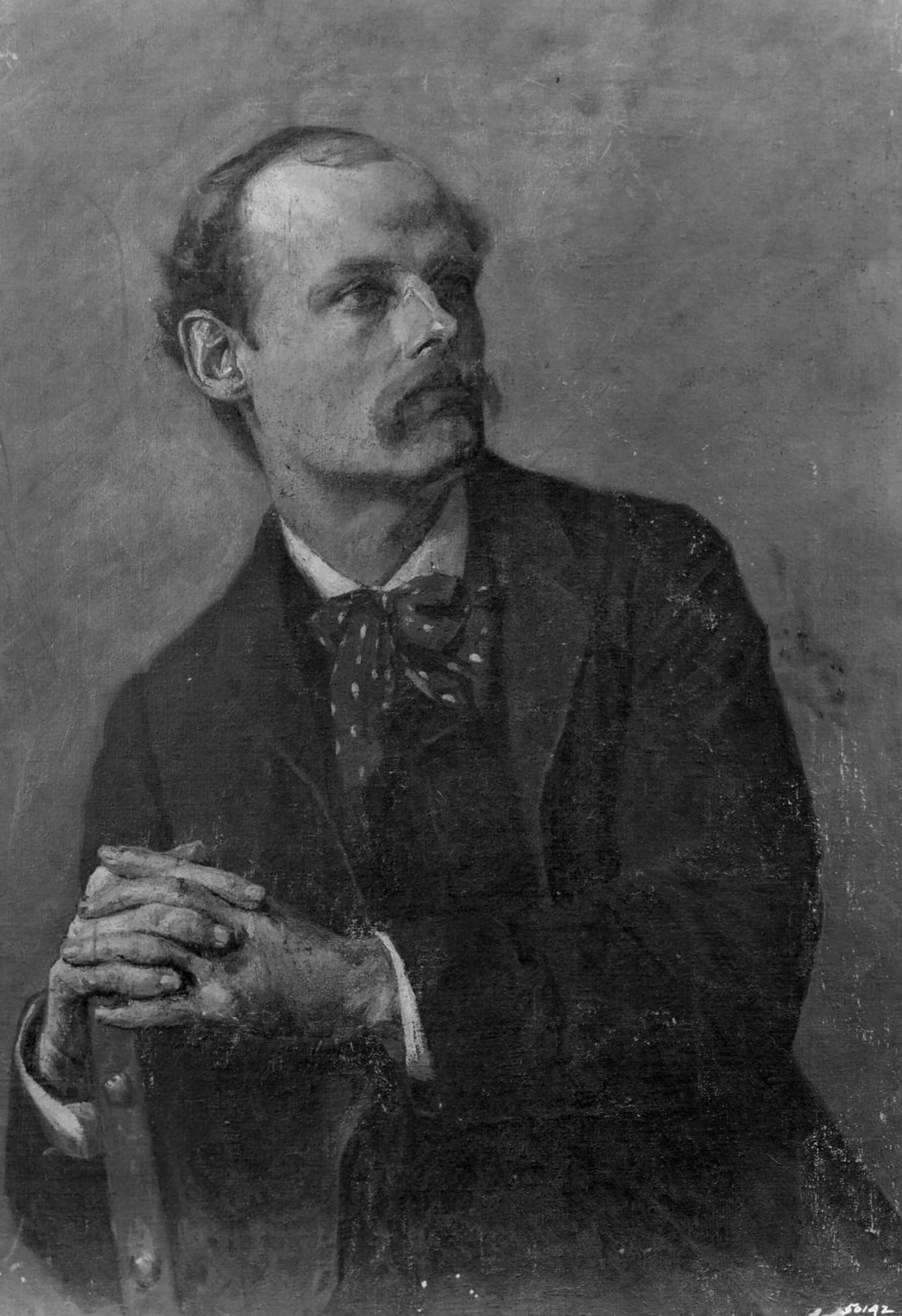
- Portrait of Stearns by Samuel Isham c. 1895
- Born: May 18, 1843; New York City, New York
- Died: September 16, 1917 (aged 74); Duxbury, Massachusetts
- Burial place: Walnut Hills Cemetery
- Education: Lawrence Scientific School at Harvard University
- Occupation: Architect
- Spouse: Ellen Elizabeth Abbott (m. 1866)

Architectural career
- Firm: Peabody and Stearns
- Partner: Robert Swain Peabody

John Goddard Stearns Jr. (May 18, 1843 – September 16, 1917) was an American architect and cofounder of the prominent Boston based firm Peabody and Stearns.

== Biography ==
John Goddard Stearns Jr. was born May 18, 1843, in New York City. He was the oldest son of John Goddard Stearns Sr. and Elizabeth Stearns, and was descendent of Richard Warren. Stearns moved to Brookline, Massachusetts in 1861 and he remained a Brookline resident for the remainder of his life.

Stearns was educated at Harvard University's Lawrence Scientific School in Cambridge, Massachusetts and graduated in 1863. After graduating, Stearns entered the Boston architectural firm of Ware & Van Brunt and eventually became head draftsman for the firm. In 1870, Stearns partnered with Robert Swain Peabody, who also worked at Ware & Van Brunt, to form Peabody and Stearns.

== Peabody and Stearns ==
Stearns made a significant contribution to his firm and the architectural profession. He combined his technical engineering training with his "true engineer's instinct" and had a keen sense of order and proportion in planning and design. He was dedicated to overseeing the firm's projects, ensuring they progressed smoothly and avoided any potential issues.

He saw not only that the work was going right, but also that it did not go wrong. He often said that the secret of successful superintendence was to know that something must be wrong, to find it, and to make it right.

He believed in the importance of thoroughness and insisted on high-quality work according to the specifications and contracts he established using his extensive knowledge of construction, building materials, and methods. This approach represented a significant departure from the lax practices of the past.

Peabody and Stearns designed numerous buildings over their 47-year partnership, some of which include:

- Cutler Hall (1877–1880), Colorado College, Colorado Springs, Colorado
- The Breakers (1878), Newport, Rhode Island
- Vinland Estate (1882), Newport, Rhode Island
- Kragsyde (1883–1885), Manchester-by-the-Sea, Massachusetts
- Union Church of Northeast Harbor (1887–1889), Northeast Harbor, Maine
- Central Railroad of New Jersey Terminal (1889), Jersey City, New Jersey
- James J. Hill House (1891), Saint Paul, Minnesota
- Duluth Depot (1892), Duluth, Minnesota
- Security Building (1892), St. Louis, Missouri
- Volta Laboratory (1893), Washington, D.C.
- Wheatleigh (1893), Stockbridge, Massachusetts
- Harvey Childs House (1896), Shadyside, Pittsburgh, Pennsylvania
- Worcester City Hall (1898), Worcester, Massachusetts
- Dorchester Heights Monument (1899–1902), Dorchester Heights, Boston, Massachusetts
- Weld Boathouse (1906), Cambridge, Massachusetts
- Custom House Tower (1913–1915), Boston, Massachusetts

Stearns was a member of the American Institute of Architects and elected a Fellow in 1894. He was also member of the Boston Society of Architects and the St. Botolph Club in Boston.

== Family and death ==
Stearns married Ellen Elizabeth Abbott on December 5, 1866, and had two children. Their son, Frank A. Stearns, was also an architect. He continued his father's firm with W. Cornell Appleton as Appleton & Stearns after his death. Stearns died September 16, 1917, at his summer home in Duxbury, Massachusetts, less than three weeks after Peabody.
