= Hotel Alexandra =

Hotel Alexandra may refer to:

- Hotel Alexandra (Boston), Massachusetts, United States, built in 1875
- Hotel Alexandra (Loen), Stryn, Norway, built in 1884
- The Alexandra, Edgeley, Greater Manchester, England

== See also ==
- Hotel Alexandria, a hotel in Los Angeles, California, U.S., that opened in 1906
- Royal Alexandra Hotel, a hotel in Winnipeg, Manitoba, Canada, that operated from 1906 to 1967
