= Henry Bradlee Jr. House =

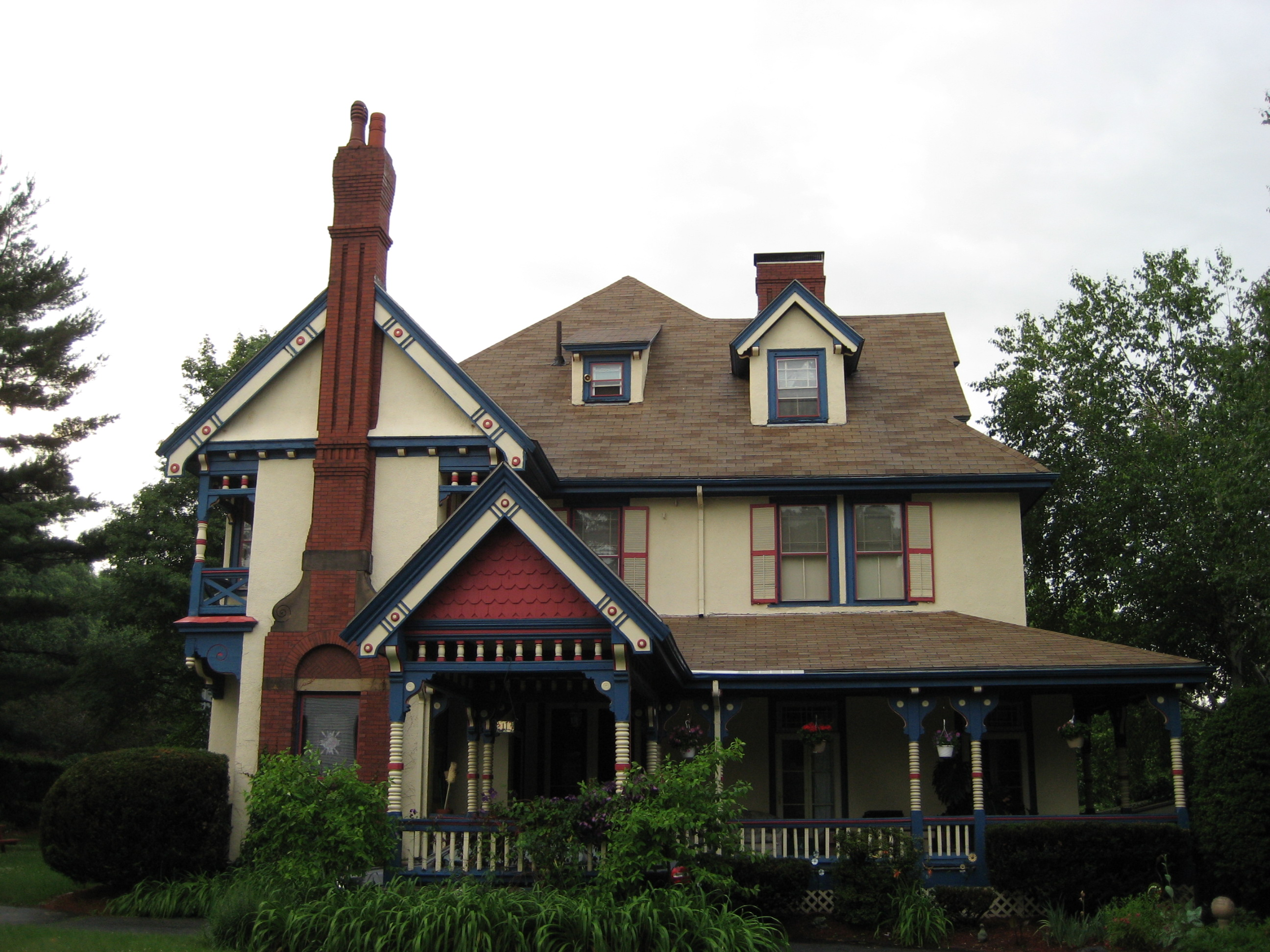
- Front view of the house (2008)

General information
- Architectural style: Queen Anne style
- Address: 11 Turell Rd.
- Town or city: Medford, Massachusetts
- Country: United States
- Coordinates: 42.4212°N 71.1105°W
- Year(s) built: 1881–1882

Design and construction
- Architecture firm: Peabody and Stearns

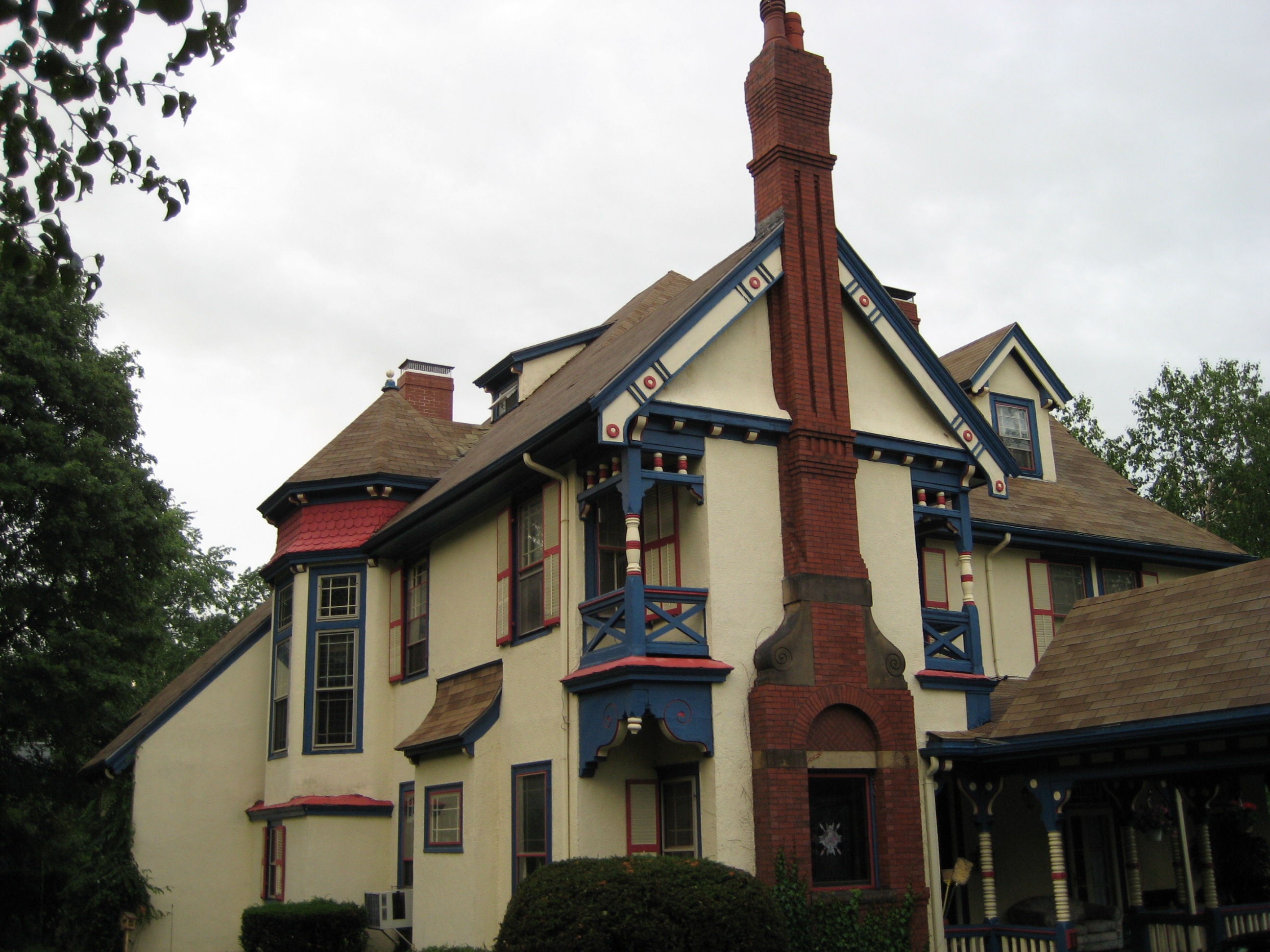
Side view of the house, including stained leaded glass windows

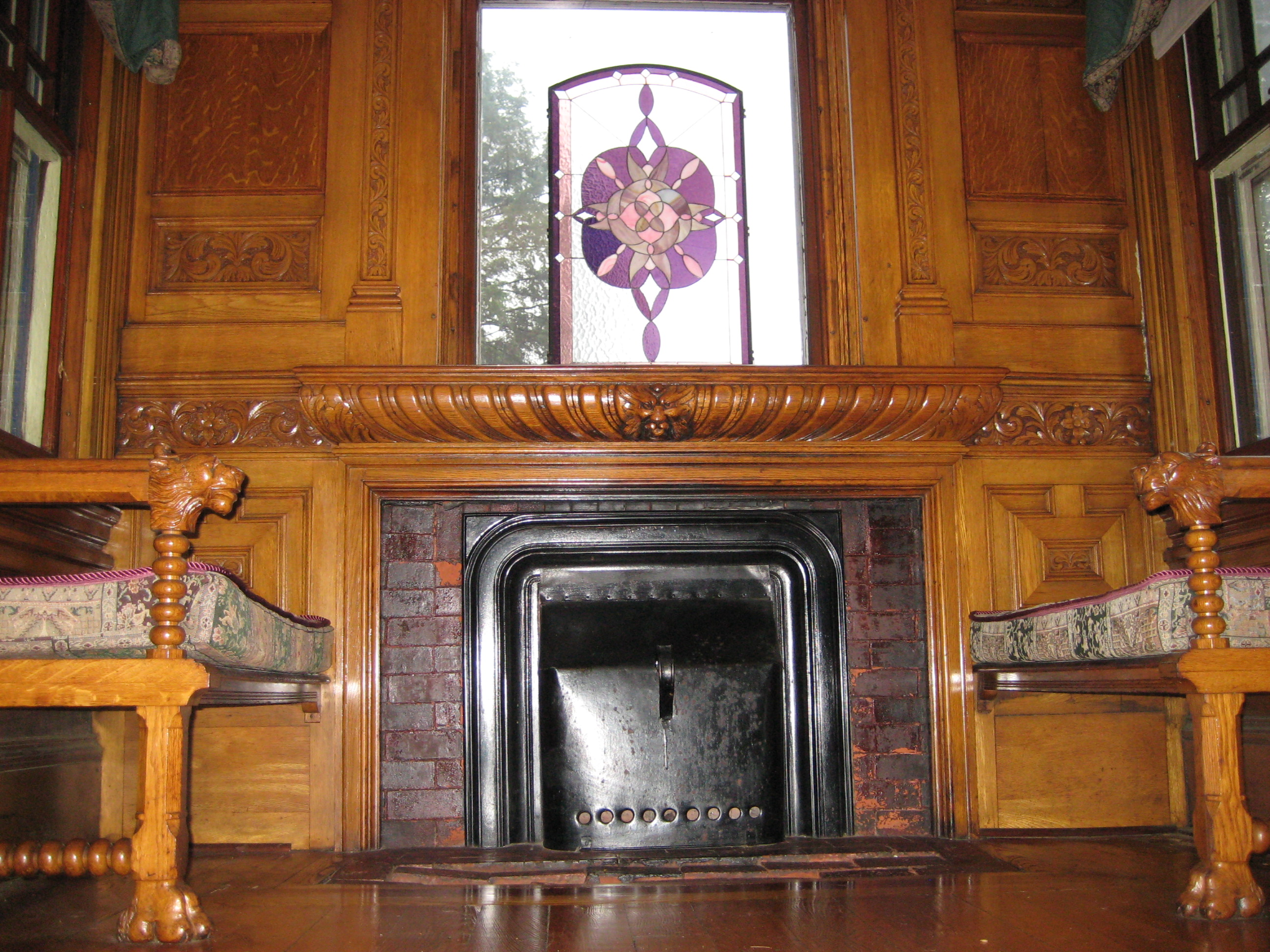
One of seven ornate fireplaces

The Henry Bradlee Jr. House is located in Medford, Massachusetts. It was designed in the Queen Anne style by Peabody & Stearns circa 1881–1882. This was one of three houses built by the Halls and the Bradlees on their estate.

This home was built for Henry Bradlee Jr., his wife Maude (Abbot) Bradlee and their son, Edward who was born in Boston in 1880. Henry and Maude were married on January 21, 1879 and this house was in part a wedding gift to them. They were married by the Rev. Leighton Parks in Boston, Massachusetts.

The other two houses were built in the mid to late 1850s for Dudley C. Hall and for Henry Bradlee Sr. and his wife Hepsa Hall Bradlee. Of those homes, according to a survey by the Massachusetts Historical Commission, the Henry Bradlee Jr. House is the best preserved.

The MHC report states in part:

Its many porches, turned posts, balconies, porte-cochere and chimney with divided flues (to allow space for a window to be placed in the center of its base) are the best details of their type in Medford. Mentioned in a deed of 1882, the house was probably constructed between March 1881 when the one and three-quarter acre [7,100 m^{3}] parcel on which it stood was first surveyed, and April 1882, when Dudley Bradlee granted a mortgage on the property to Henry Bradlee and his wife, Maude.

The only major alteration to the house has been the replacement of its original decorative shingle work with stucco. This change was probably made around 1910 when the area was being built up with fashionable Stucco Style houses.

Henry Bradlee Jr. came from an upper-class family from the Medford and Boston area. He was born January 30, 1851, and died April 13, 1894. His grandfather, Josiah Bradlee of Boston is known to have participated in the event known as the Boston Tea Party in 1773. He was a descendant of Governor Simon Bradstreet of the Massachusetts Bay Colony, as well as of Charles Tufts. Henry Bradlee Jr. had two siblings, Ellen Marion Bradlee and Dudley Hall Bradlee.

== Historic ship ==
The 1846 ship Josiah Bradlee, 648 tons, was built by John Taylor in Medford, Massachusetts. It was owned by George K. Minot and Samuel Hooper in 1849, then registered to William and William L. Thwing, April 19, 1859. It was sold to Sprague and Soule in September 1860, to unknown parties in 1862, and to a British account in 1864.
