= Christ Episcopal Church (Waltham, Massachusetts) =

Historic church in Massachusetts, United States

Christ Church
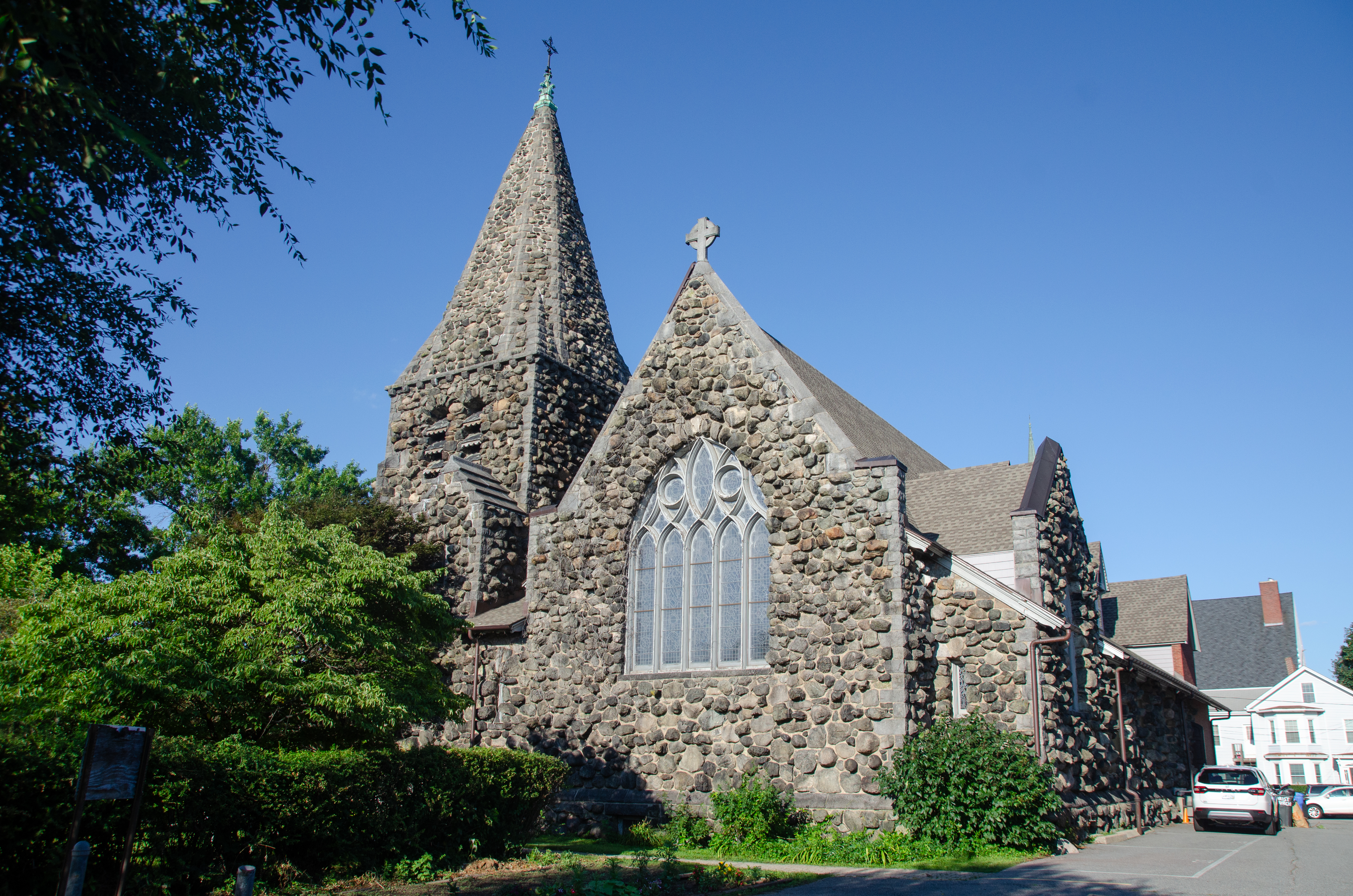
- Christ Church western façade (2023)
- Christ Church
- Address: 750 Main Street; Waltham, Massachusetts
- Country: United States
- Denomination: Episcopal
- Website: Church website

History
- Founded: 1848
- Founder: Albert C. Patterson
- Consecrated: 1902

Architecture
- Architect: Peabody and Stearns
- Style: English country
- Years built: 1897–1898

Specifications
- Materials: Fieldstone

Administration
- Diocese: Episcopal Diocese of Massachusetts
- Christ Church
- U.S. National Register of Historic Places
- Location within Massachusetts Location within the United States
- Location: Waltham, Massachusetts
- Coordinates: 42°22′32″N 71°14′27″W
- Built: 1897-1898
- Architect: Peabody and Stearns
- MPS: Waltham MRA
- NRHP reference No.: 89001546
- Added to NRHP: September 28, 1989

Christ Church is a historic Episcopal church at 750 Main Street in Waltham, Massachusetts. The church is a parish of the Episcopal Diocese of Massachusetts, and was named to the National Register of Historic Places in 1989.

The church reported 382 members in 2016 and 369 members in 2023; no membership statistics were reported in 2024 parochial reports. Plate and pledge income reported for the congregation in 2024 was $101,544 with average Sunday attendance (ASA) of 38 persons.

The church was founded in 1848, but a local hall was used for services until a wooden church was built in 1849. The wooden structure eventually proved inadequate and a larger church designed by Peabody and Stearns was built of local fieldstone at the current location between 1897 and 1898.

The church contains stained glass windows produced by several noteworthy manufacturers, including Clayton and Bell, Charles Connick, Louis Comfort Tiffany, and Donald MacDonald. Eight rectors have served the church since its founding.

== History ==
The community of Christ Church was founded in 1848 by Albert C. Patterson, an Episcopal clergyman and missionary who identified the growing industrial city of Waltham as an ideal place to build a church. The new Episcopal community met in Rumford Hall (later Waltham City Hall) until a Gothic wooden church was completed on Central Street in Waltham in 1849. The land for the church and much of its funding was provided by founding member J. S. Copley Greene.

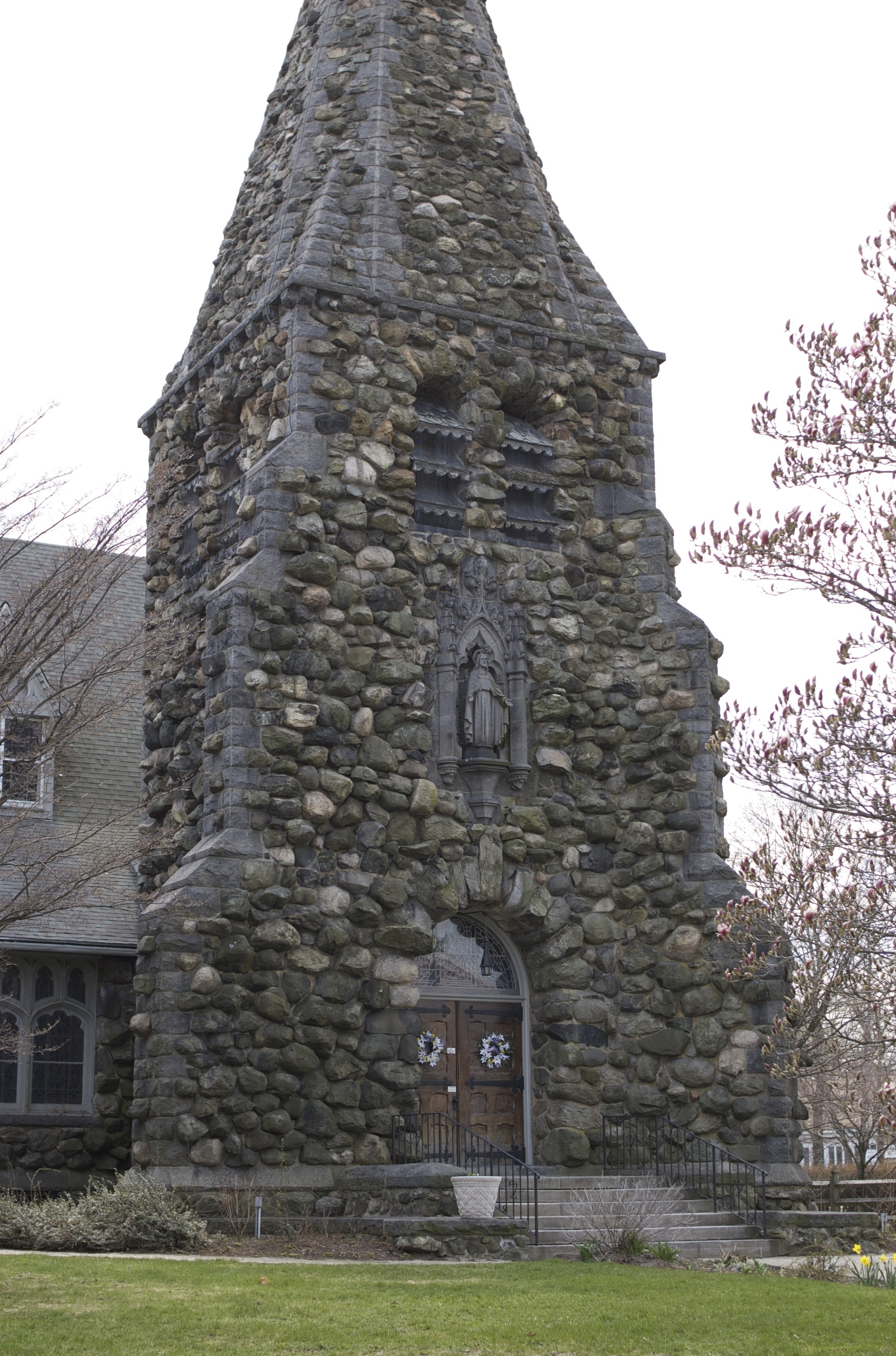
Fieldstone base of the church's stone steeple

Christ Church's first rector was the Rev. Thomas F. Fales, from St. Paul's Episcopal Church in Brunswick, Maine. Fales remained the church's rector for more than 40 years, until retiring in 1890. During this time, Christ Church's membership grew from 15 members to more than 400.

At about the time Fales retired, the church outgrew the Central Street building. In 1892, the parish bought land with the intent of building a larger church at 750 Main Street. In 1895, the old church building was sold to a French Canadian Roman Catholic community. Christ Church held services in Waltham's Maynard Hall until the new building could be completed.

In 1896, after four years of planning, the architectural firm of Peabody and Stearns was hired to design the new structure and construction began in the early months of 1897. Philanthropist and Christ Church senior warden Robert Treat Paine Jr. signed the contract for construction, and financed much of the building with his own fortune. Philanthropist sisters and Christ Church parishioners Harriet Sarah and Mary Sophia Walker also contributed significantly to the funding.

The first service in the completed building was held on June 17, 1898. That Sunday, the retired Rev. Fales delivered the church's inaugural sermon from the wooden pulpit that was his gift to the new building.

The church is a parish of the Episcopal Diocese of Massachusetts, and was named to the National Register of Historic Places in 1989.

== Architecture and design ==
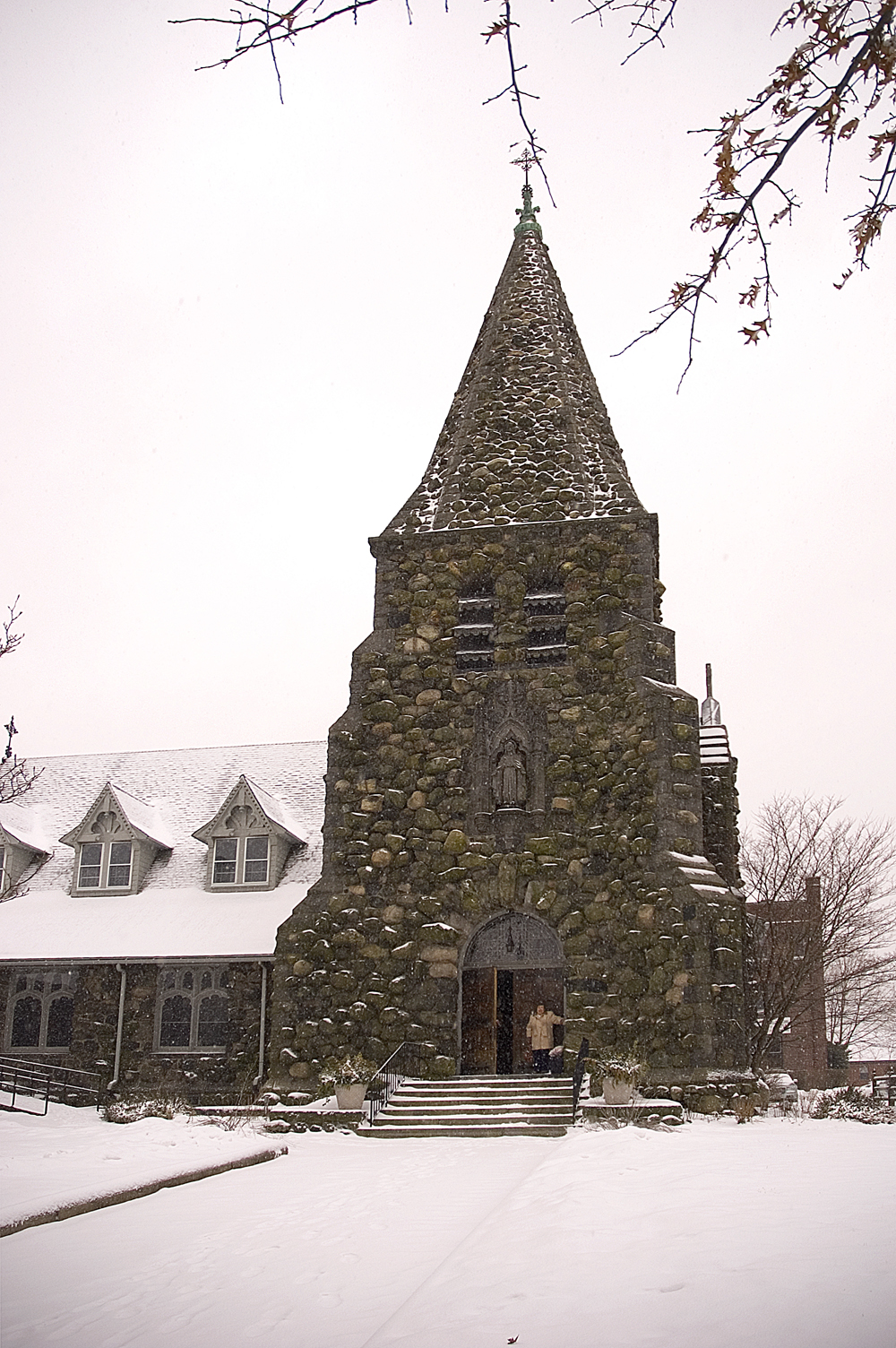
Christ Church after a snowfall

Christ Church was designed by Peabody and Stearns, masters of American Shingle style architecture, and was constructed of native Waltham fieldstone in the English Country style. The inspiration for the church's stone exterior came indirectly from architect H. H. Richardson, who was also a friend and Harvard classmate of Robert Treat Paine Jr. When Paine remodeled and expanded his Waltham home in 1883, it was Richardson who designed the residence that would become Stonehurst, a Shingle style mansion built of glacial stones quarried on site from Paine's estate. Richardson died in 1886 and played no part in the planning of Christ Church, but it was his Stonehurst design that inspired Robert Treat Paine Jr. to use the same stones from his property for the exterior of the church.

The church features several stained glass windows of significance. The east window, by Clayton and Bell, was a gift from Robert Treat Paine Jr. in memory of his wife, Lydia Lyman Paine, who died in 1897 during the construction of the church. At Paine's request, his wife's likeness was incorporated into the left panel of the window as a red-clad figure kneeling before Christ. The west window, designed by Charles Connick, pays homage to Waltham's manufacturing history. In addition to images of Ruth, Solomon, and Noah — all industrious figures in the Bible — the window features rivets, a bicycle wheel, a watch escapement, a Metz car, and other symbols that reference Waltham's industrial character. Along the south wall is a signed Tiffany window, designed by Tiffany artist Frederick Wilson. The window depicts the Nativity, and was given to the church in 1908 by John H. Storer in memory of Frank Henry Perkins and Mary Ella Perkins. Also along the south wall is a window by noted Boston stained glass artist Donald MacDonald. This work, given in memory of Harriet K. Parmenter, depicts the Easter scene of the risen Christ revealing himself to Mary Magdalene.

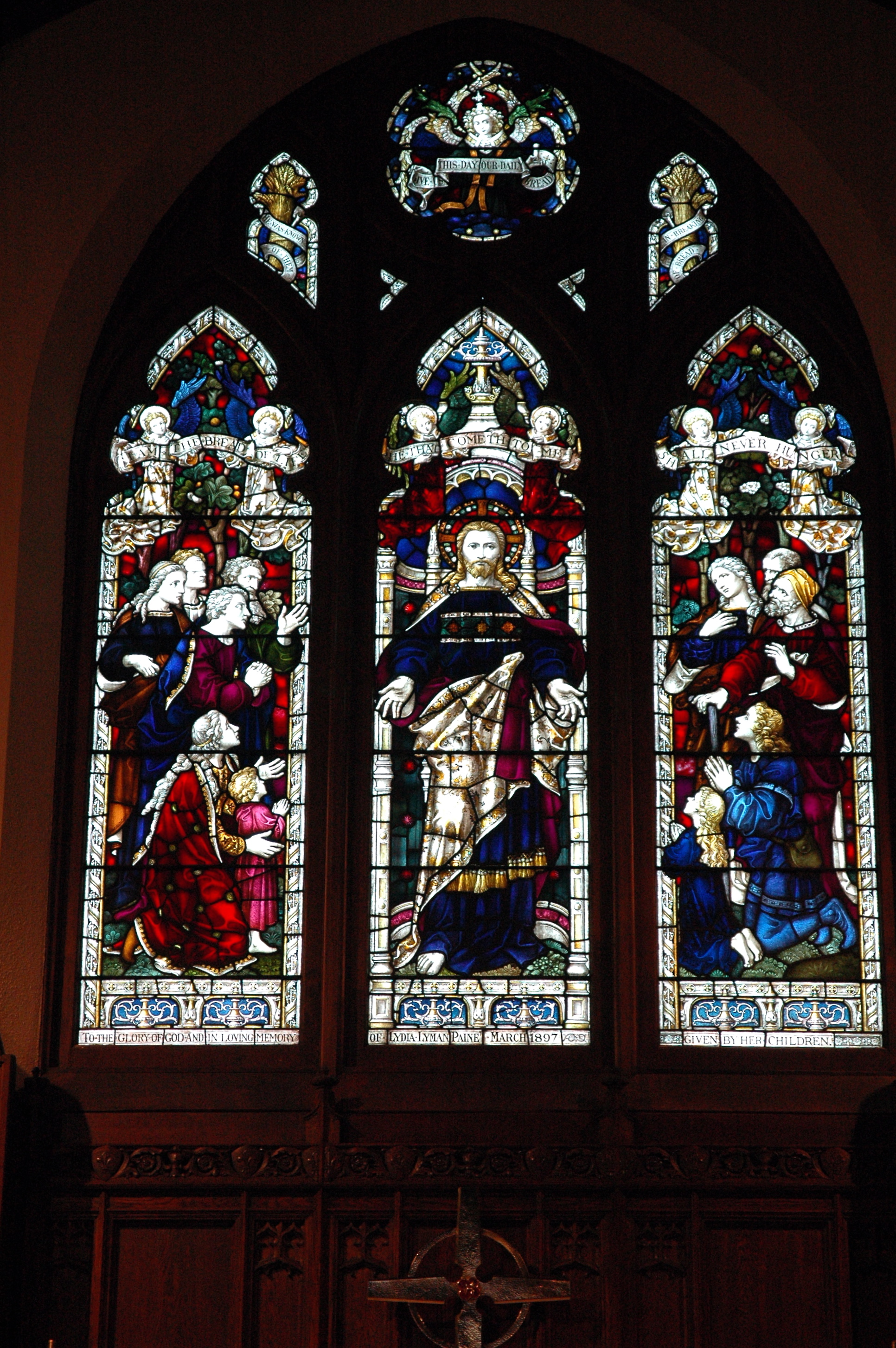
The east window featuring the likeness of Lydia Lyman Paine

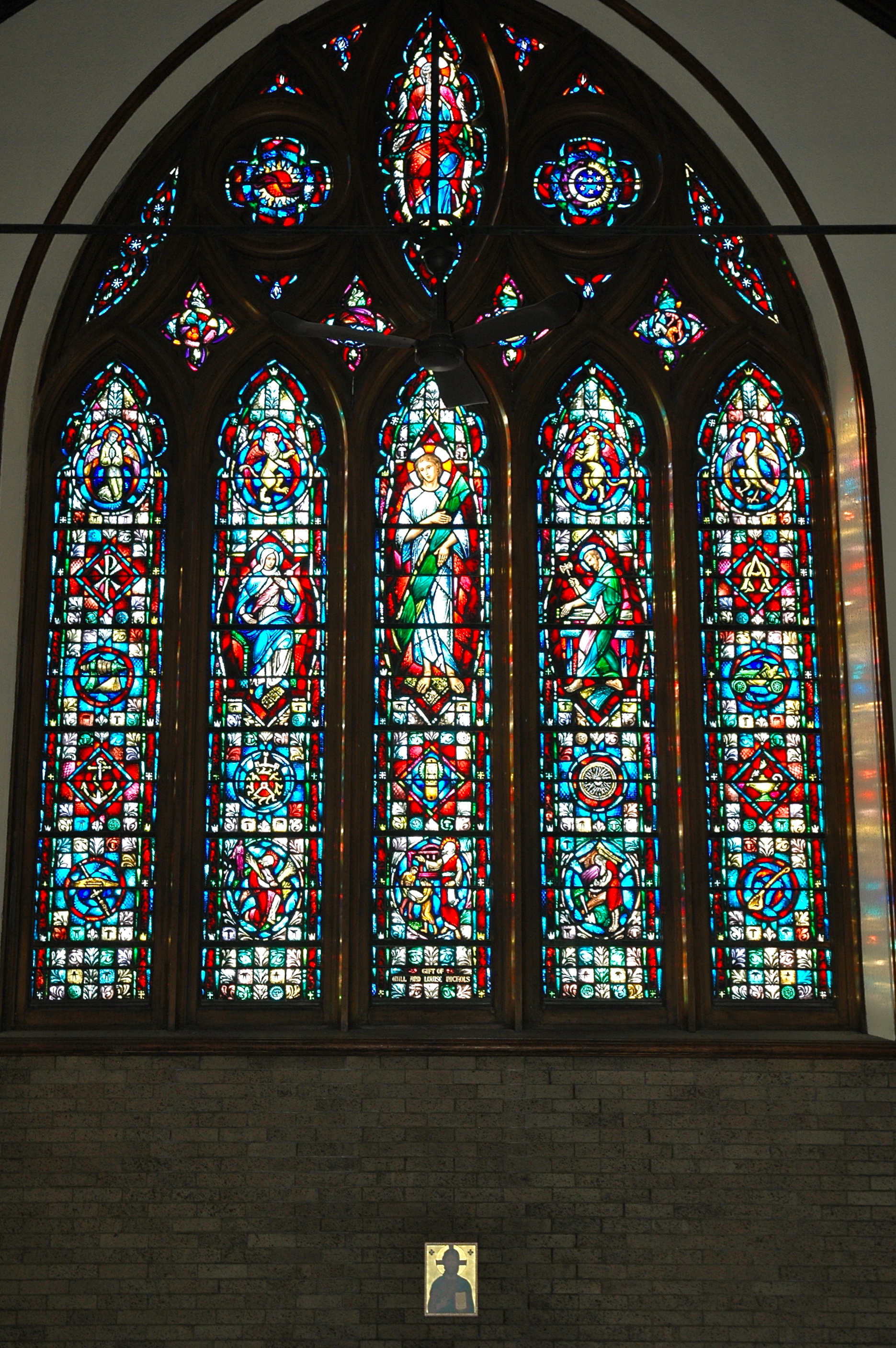
The west window with references to Waltham's industries

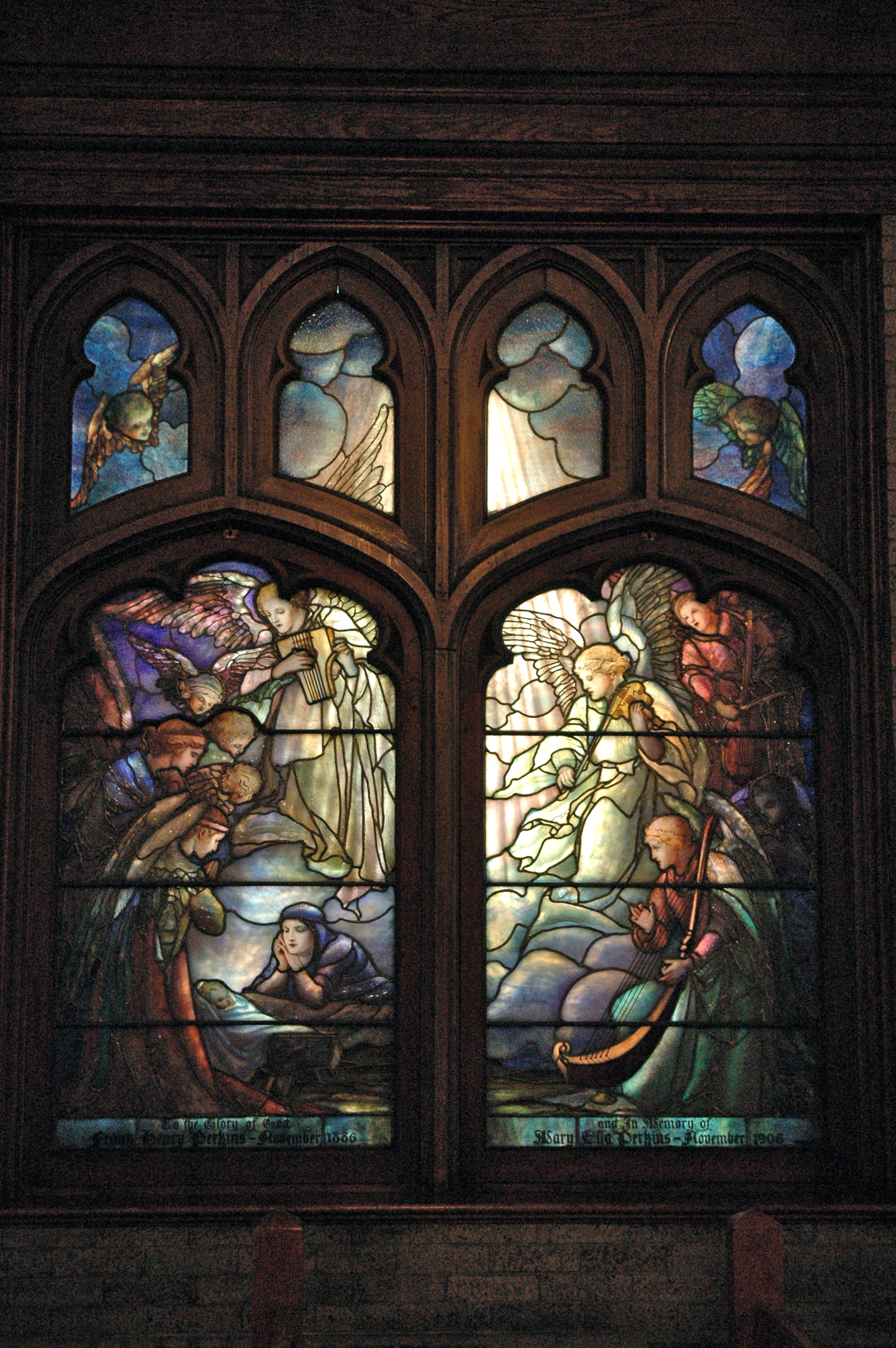
Tiffany window along the south wall

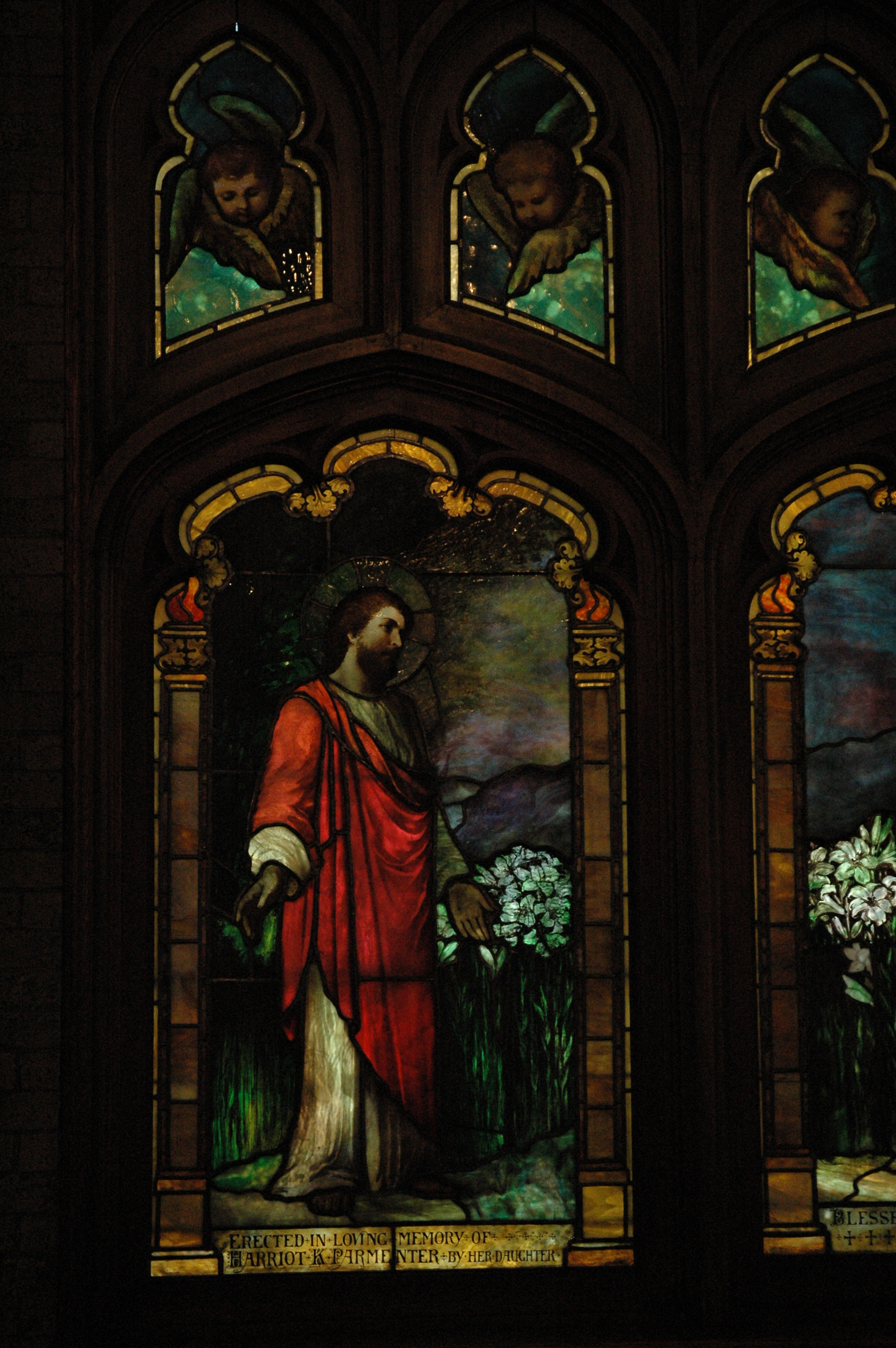
Left pane of Donald MacDonald's Easter window along the south wall

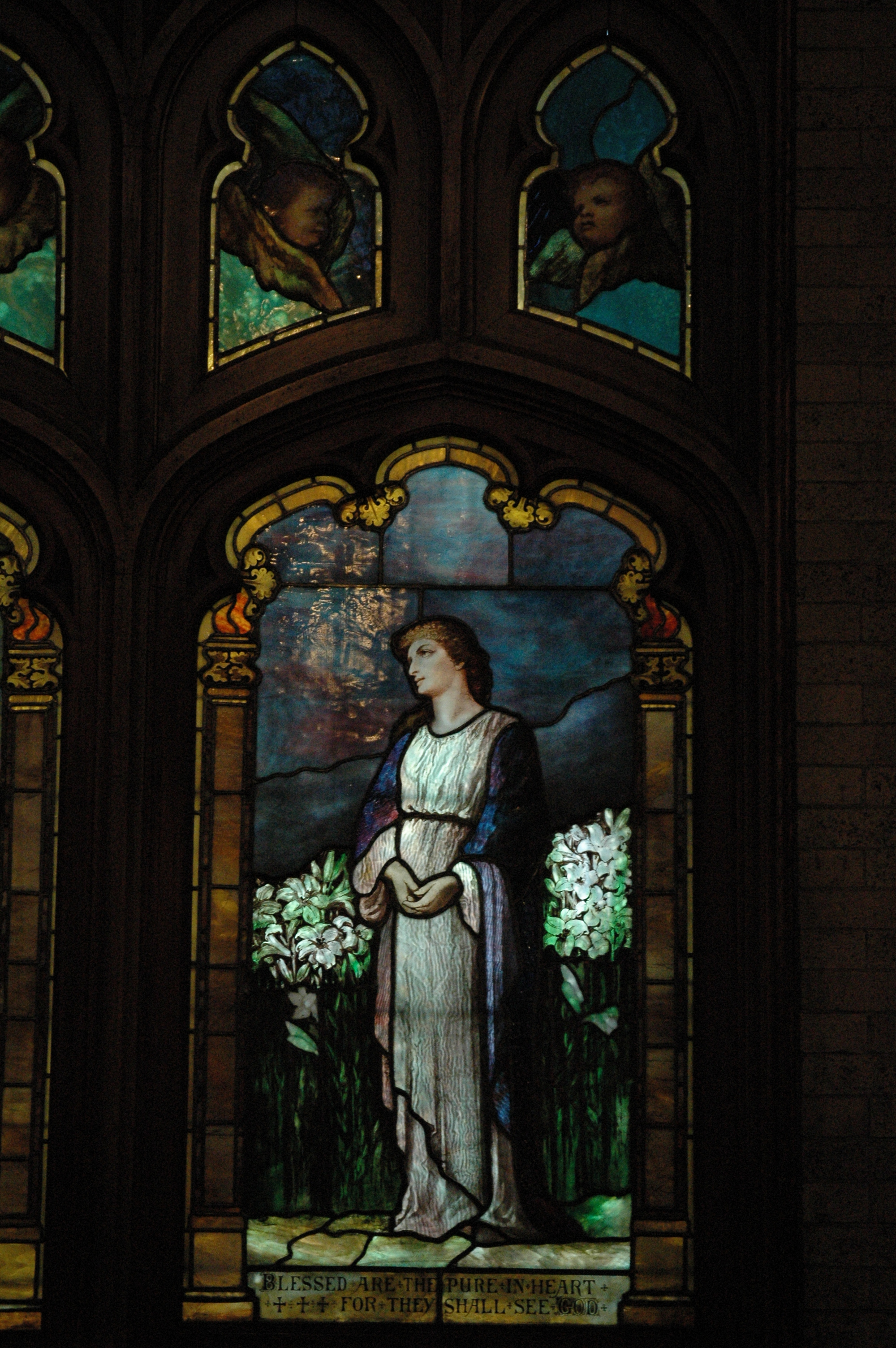
Right pane of Easter window

== Rectors ==
Since its founding, eight clergy have been elected by the Christ Church parish to serve as rector:

- The Rev. Thomas F. Fales (1849–1890)
- The Rev. Herbert Noel Cunningham (1890–1895)
- The Rev. Hubert Wetmore Wells (1896–1900)
- The Rev. Francis Ellsworth Webster (1901–1930)
- The Rev. George O. Ekwall (1930–1960)
- The Rev. John S. Kromer (1961–1970)
- The Rev. William R. Mawhinney (1971–1999)
- The Rev. Sara H. Irwin (2009–2017)
- The Rev. Dr. Kapya John Kaoma (2019–present)

Note: In the intervening years listed above, a priest-in-charge appointed by the bishop served as the leader of the church.

== See also ==
- National Register of Historic Places listings in Waltham, Massachusetts
