= Springfield Fire & Marine Insurance Co. =

- U.S. National Register of Historic Places
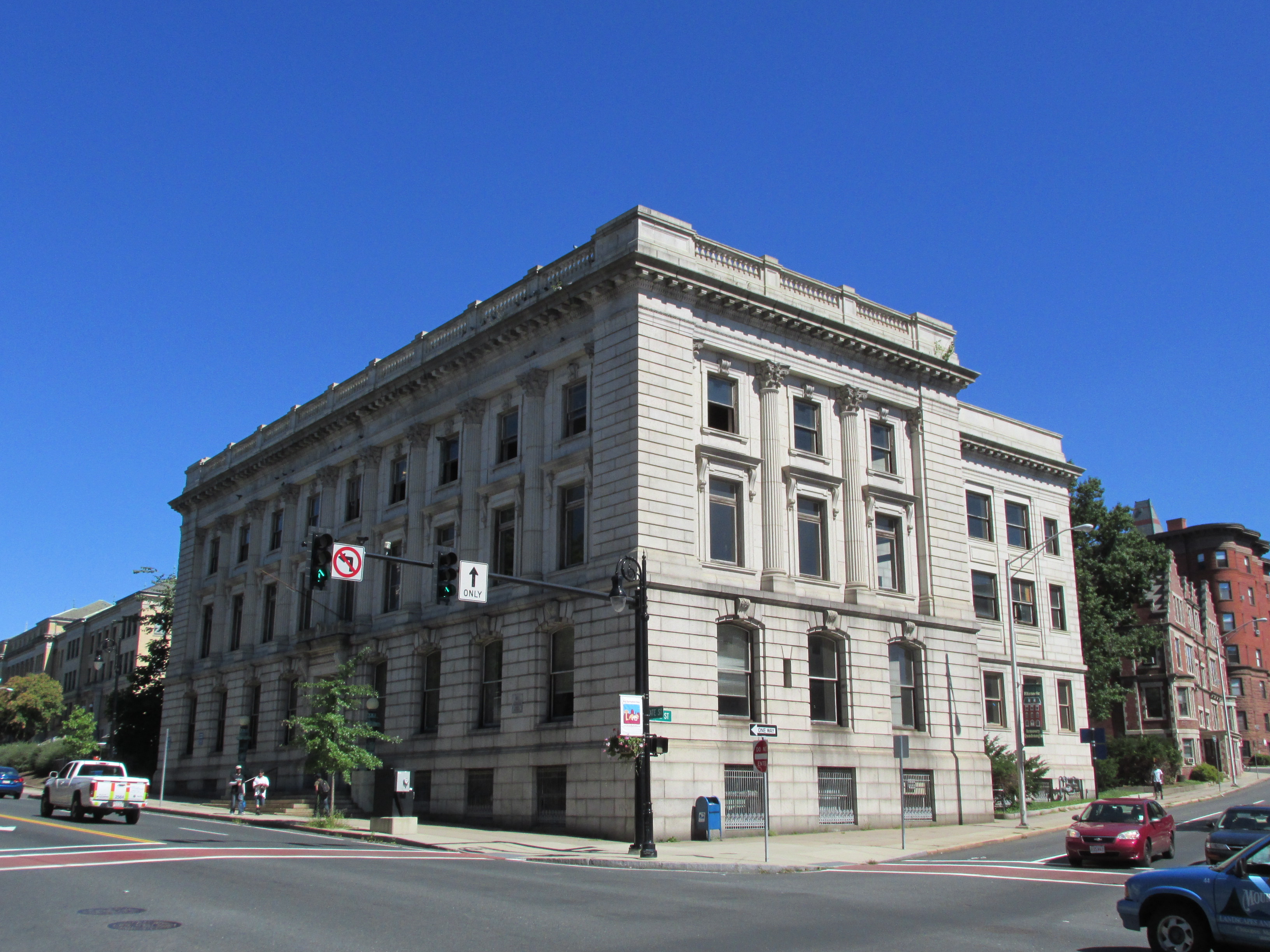
- Springfield Fire & Marine Insurance Co.

- Location within Massachusetts Location within the United States
- Location: Springfield, Massachusetts
- Coordinates: 42°6′6″N 72°35′11″W
- Built: 1905
- Architect: Peabody & Stearns
- Architectural style: Classical Revival
- MPS: Downtown Springfield MRA
- NRHP reference No.: 83000766
- Added to NRHP: February 24, 1983

The Springfield Fire & Marine Insurance Co. is a historic commercial building at 195 State Street in Springfield, Massachusetts. Built in 1905 to a design by the renowned architecture firm Peabody and Stearns, it is a fine example of commercial Classical Revival architecture. It was listed on the National Register of Historic Places in 1983.

== Description and history ==
The Springfield Fire & Marine Insurance Company building occupies the northeast corner of State and Maple Streets in downtown Springfield, a prominent location opposite Merrick Park the Quadrangle. It is a large three-story masonry structure, faced in limestone. The ground floor is set in wide courses of large blocks, with windows set in keystoned segmented-arch openings. The bays of the upper levels are demarcated by two-story pilasters, with hooded windows on the second level and keystoned lintels on the third. The entrance is recessed at the center of the 9-bay State Street side. The building is capped by a modillioned cornice and balustrade surrounding a flat roof.

The Springfield Fire & Marine Insurance Co. was incorporated in 1849. Originally housed at the City Hotel, it built the Fort Block on Main Street in 1858 to house its growing business. It had this building built in 1905, and occupied it until 1966. It was merged into the Insurance Company of North America in 1958. The building has since been used as the headquarters of the City of Springfield School Department, and presently houses local offices of the State Street Corporation.

== See also ==
- National Register of Historic Places listings in Springfield, Massachusetts
- National Register of Historic Places listings in Hampden County, Massachusetts
