= Peabody and Stearns =

American architectural firm (1870–1917)

Peabody & Stearns
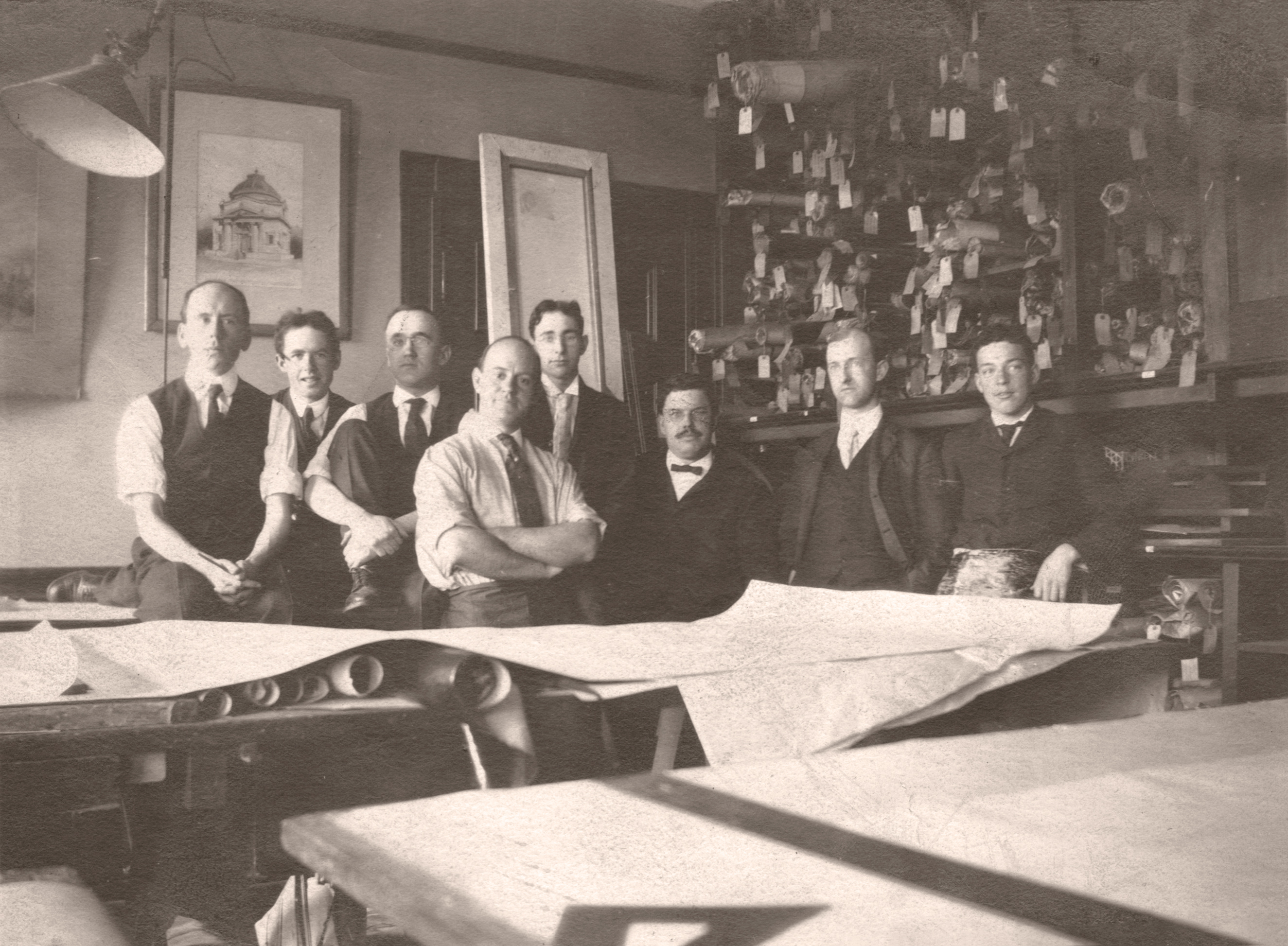
- Peabody and Stearns Boston Office (c.1905)

Practice information
- Partners: Robert Swain Peabody, John Goddard Stearns Jr., George A. Fuller, Pierce P. Furber
- Founders: Robert Swain Peabody, John Goddard Stearns Jr.
- Founded: 1870
- Dissolved: 1917
- Location: Boston, Massachusetts

Significant works and honors
- Buildings: Custom House Tower; Exchange Building; The Breakers Mansion; Rough Point Mansion; Bussey Institute; Worcester City Hall; Security Building; Dorchester Heights Monument; Harvey Childs House; Elm Court; Kragsyde; Lawrenceville School; Bangor High School; Bangor Public Library; Central Railroad of New Jersey Terminal; Christ Church; Hotel Alexandra

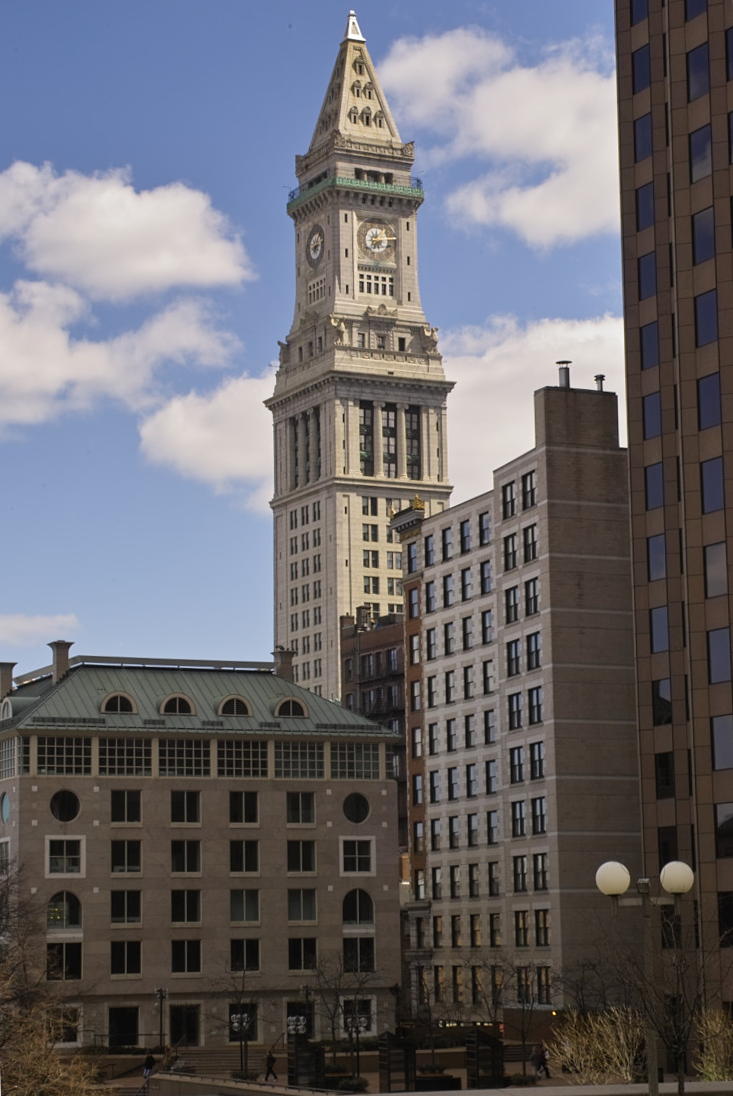
Custom House Tower, Boston

Peabody & Stearns was a premier architectural firm in the Eastern United States in the late 19th century and early 20th century. Based in Boston, Massachusetts, the firm consisted of Robert Swain Peabody (1845–1917) and John Goddard Stearns Jr. (1843–1917). The firm worked on a variety of designs but is closely associated with shingle style.

With addition of Pierce P. Furber, presumably as partner, the firm became Peabody, Stearns & Furber. (Note: Out of 32 NRHP entries listing "Peabody" and "Stearns" in the NRIS database, just one (Security Building) also includes "Furber".) The firm was later succeeded by W. Cornell Appleton, one of the Peabody & Stearns architects, and Frank Stearns, son of Frank, as Appleton & Stearns.

== Works ==
=== Georgia ===
- Plum Orchard (George L. Carnegie House), Cumberland Island (1898)
- Stafford Place (William Carnegie House), Cumberland Island (1901)
- Greyfield (Margaret Carnegie Ricketson House), Cumberland Island (1901)

=== Maine ===
- York Hall (William D. Sewall House), 1 Edwards St., Bath (1896–98)
- Bangor High School, 185 Harlow St., Bangor (1912)
- Bangor Public Library, 145 Harlow St., Bangor (1912)
- Exchange Building, 27 State St., Bangor (1912–13)

=== Massachusetts ===
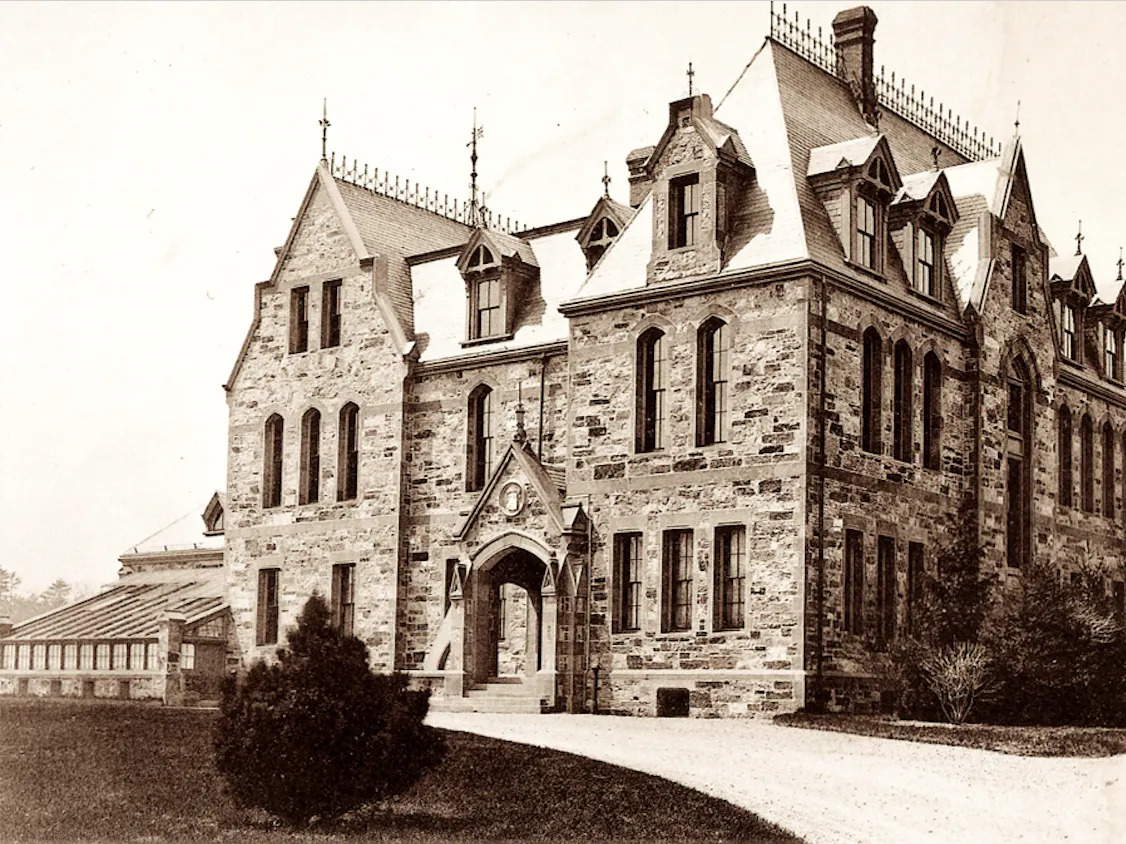
Bussey Institute, Harvard University

- Matthews Hall, Harvard University, Cambridge, (1871)
- Bussey Institute, Harvard University, Jamaica Plain, (1871)
- Frederick L. Ames House, 306 Dartmouth St., Boston (1872)
- College Hall, Smith College, Northampton (1875)
- R. H. White department store, 518–536 Washington Street, Boston (1876)
- First Church of Christ, 129 Main St., Northampton (1878)
- Shepherd Brooks House, 275 Grove St., Medford (1881)
- Dudley Hall Bradlee House, 21 Ashcroft Road, Medford, Massachusetts (1878)
- Henry Bradlee Jr. House, Medford (1881–82)
- James C. Bayley House, 16 Fairmont Ave., Newton (1883–84)
- Kragsyde (George N. Black Jr. House), 27 Smith's Point Rd., Manchester-by-the-Sea (1883) – Demolished 1929.
- Elm Court (William D. Sloane House), 310 Old Stockbridge Rd., Lenox (1886)
- Exchange Building, 53 State St., Boston (1887–91)
- First Parish Church, 349 Boston Post Rd., Weston (1888)
- Greystone (Jonathan H. White House), 62 Buckminster Rd., Brookline (1888)
- Charles E. Cotting Buildings, 186–192 South St., Boston (1891)
- Wheatleigh (Henry H. Cook House), Hawthorne Rd., Stockbridge (1893)
- Fiske Building, 75 State St., Boston (1896) – Demolished 1984.
- Christ Episcopal Church, 750 Main St., Waltham (1897–1902)
- Worcester City Hall, 455 Main St., Worcester (1898)
- Dorchester Heights Monument, Dorchester (1902)
- Marlborough Public Library, 35 W. Main St., Marlborough (1903–04)
- Springfield Fire & Marine Insurance Co. Building, 195 State St., Springfield (1905)
- U. S. Custom House Tower, Boston (1913–15)
- Norfolk County Registry of Deeds, Dedham, Massachusetts (1905)
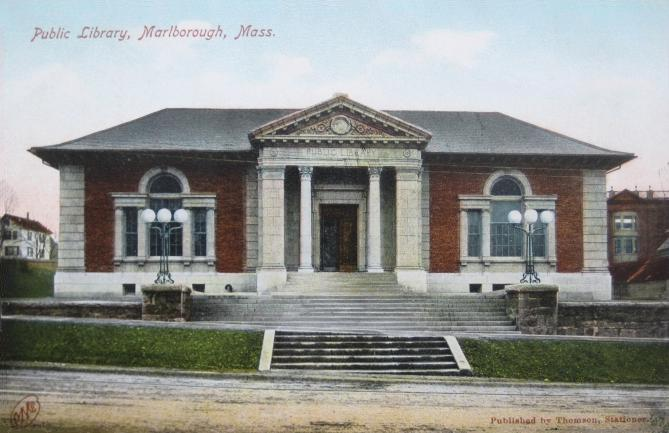
  Public Library, Marlborough, Massachusetts

=== Missouri ===
- St. Louis School and Museum of Fine Arts, 1815 Locust St., St. Louis (1879–81) – Demolished 1919.
- Unitarian Church of the Messiah, 508 N. Garrison Ave., St. Louis (1880–82) – Demolished 1987.
- Turner Building, 304 N. 8th St., St. Louis (1882–83) – Demolished 1902.
- St. Louis Club, T.E. Huntley Ave. & Locust Blvd., St. Louis (1884–85) – Demolished.
- George Blackman House, 5843 Bartmer Ave., St. Louis (1885)
- Alvah Mansur House, 3700 Lindell Blvd., St. Louis (1885–86)
- Charles F. Morse House, 200 E. 36th St., Kansas City (1887) – Demolished.
- Henry L. Newman House, 21 Westmoreland Pl., St. Louis (1889) – Demolished.
- Security Building, 319 N. 4th St., St. Louis (1890–92), (Peabody, Stearns & Furber)
- Corinne Dyer House, 38 Westmoreland Pl., St. Louis (1892)
- Edward C. Rowse House, 10 Benton Pl., St. Louis (1892)
- John T. Davis House, 17 Westmoreland Pl., St. Louis (1893–94)
- Dr. George Ashe Bronson House, 3201 Washington Ave., St. Louis (1885)

=== Minnesota ===
- James J. Hill House, 240 Summit Ave., St. Paul (1887–91) – Peabody & Stearns were fired from the project in 1889.
- Union Depot, 509 W. Michigan Ave., Duluth (1890–92)

=== New Jersey ===
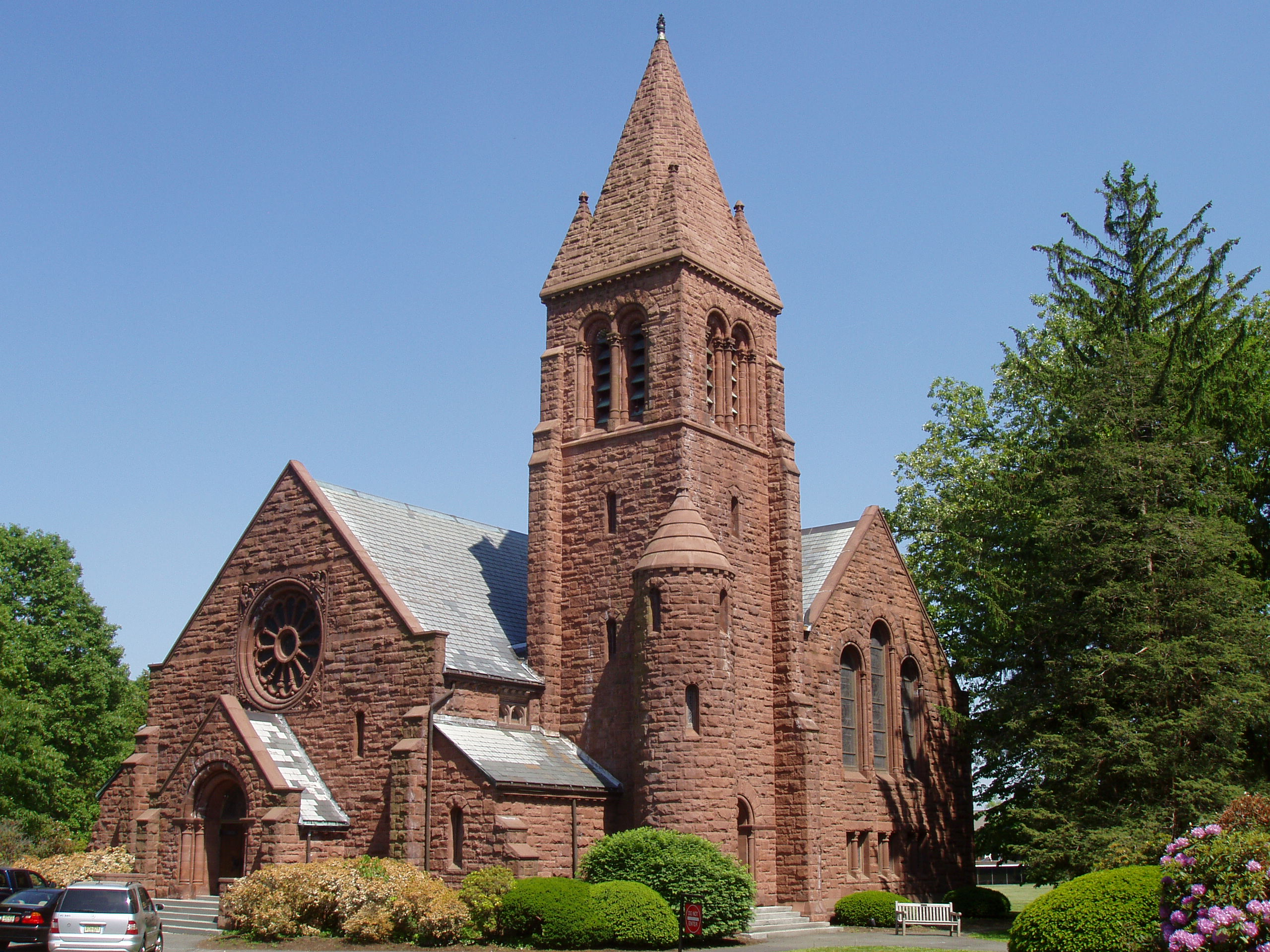
Edith Memorial Chapel, Lawrenceville School

- Elberon Casino, Lincoln Ave., Elberon (1882–83) – Demolished.
- Lawrenceville School, Lawrenceville (1884–95)
- Central Railroad of New Jersey Terminal, Jersey City (1888–89)

=== Pennsylvania ===
- George W. Childs-Drexel House, 1726 Locust St., Philadelphia (1893)
- Nathaniel Holmes House, Morewood & 5th Aves., Pittsburgh (1895) – Demolished.
- Harvey Childs House, 718 Devonshire St., Pittsburgh (1896)
- Sarah Drexel Fell House, 1801 Walnut St., Philadelphia (1896–98)
- Durbin Horne House, 7418 Penn Ave., Pittsburgh (1897)
- Joseph Horne & Co. Dept. Store, 501 Penn Ave., Pittsburgh (1897–98)
- East Liberty Market, 5900 Baum Blvd., Pittsburgh (1898–1900)
- Remsen V. Messler House, 651 Morewood Ave., Pittsburgh (1900–01)
- Laurento (E. Craig Biddle House), Darby-Paoli Rd., Villanova (1901) – Demolished 1980s.
- Penshurst (Percival Roberts House), Conshohocken State Rd., Lower Merion (1901) – Demolished.
- Krisheim (George Woodward House), 7514 McCallum St., Philadelphia (1910)
- Westview (Livingston L. Biddle House), Westview Rd., Bryn Mawr (1917)

=== Rhode Island ===
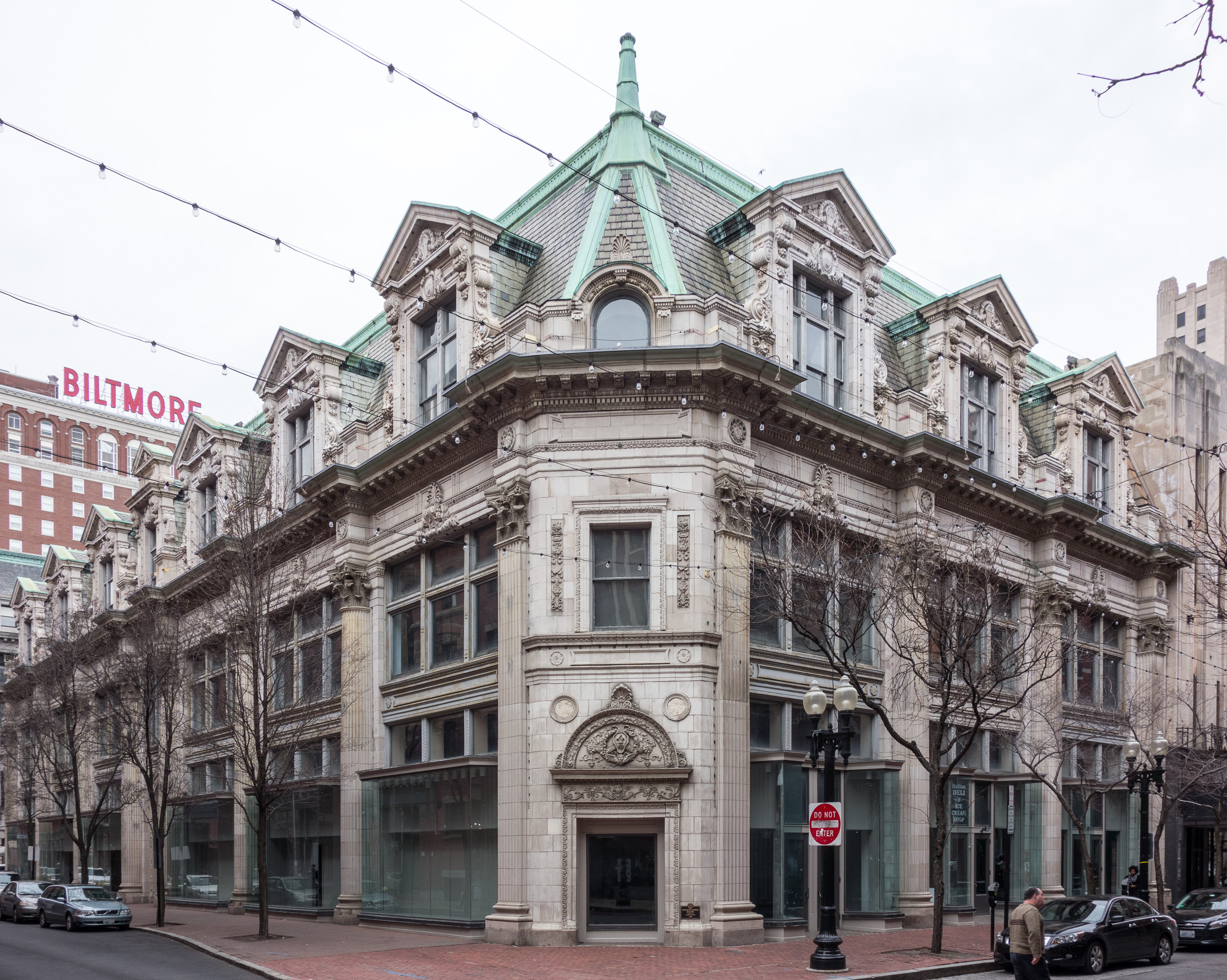
The Providence Journal Building at the corner of Westminster and Eddy Street

- Frederick S. G. D'Hauteville House, 489 Bellevue Ave., Newport (1871) – Burned.
- Nathan Matthews House, 492 Bellevue Ave., Newport (1871–72) – Burned 1881.
- Weetamoe (Nathaniel Thayer House), 2 Rovensky Ave., Newport (1872)
- Grace W. Rives House, 30 Red Cross Ave., Newport (1875–76)
- The Breakers (Pierre Lorillard IV House), 44 Ochre Point Ave., Newport (1877–78) – Burned 1892, later replaced.
- Hillside (Arthur B. Emmons House), 300 Gibbs Ave., Newport (1882)
- Vinland (Catharine Lorillard Wolfe House), Newport (1882–83) – Now Salve Regina's Mcauley Hall.
- Honeysuckle Lodge (Josiah M. Fiske House), 255 Ruggles Ave., Newport (1885–86)
- Midcliff (Caroline Ogden M. Jones House), 229 Ruggles Ave., Newport (1886)
- Pavilion, Easton's Beach, Memorial Blvd., Newport (1887) – Destroyed 1938
- Ocean Lawn (Elizabeth Gammell House), 51 Cliff Ave., Newport (1888–89)
- Rough Point (Frederick W. Vanderbilt House), 680 Bellevue Ave., Newport (1888–91)
- Althorpe (John T. Spencer House), Ruggles Ave., Newport (1889–90) – Now Salve Regina's Founders Hall.
- Episcopal Church of the Messiah, 1680 Westminster St., Providence (1889–90)
- Rockhurst (H. Mortimer Brooks House), Bellevue Ave., Newport (1891) – Demolished 1955.
- Parish House for St. John's Episcopal Church, 275 N. Main St., Providence (1893) – Demolished.
- Shamrock Cliff (G. M. Gaun McRobert Hutton House), 65 Ridge Rd., Newport (1894)
- Beechbound (William F. Burden House), 127 Harrison Ave., Newport (1895)
- Bleak House (Ross R. Winans House), Ocean Ave., Newport (1895) – Demolished 1948.
- Ridgemere (Fannie Foster House), 11 Leroy Ave., Newport (1896)
- Hopedene (Elizabeth H. Gammell Slater House), 43 Cliff Ave., Newport (1899–1902)
- Providence Journal Building, 60 Eddy St., Providence (1906)

=== Washington, D.C. ===
- Volta Bureau, 3414 Volta Pl. NW, Washington, D.C. (1893)

== Notable Peabody & Stearns architects ==
- John Scudder Adkins – likely helped design buildings for the World's Columbian Exposition in 1893
- Francis Richmond Allen – began career at the firm; partner of Allen & Collens
- Robert Day Andrews – was an office boy for the firm in 1874; partner in Andrews, Jaques & Rantoul
- Charles L. Bevins – worked for the firm from 1878–1882
- Clarence H. Blackall – worked at the firm from 1884 to 1888, was the firm's chief draftsman
- Warren R. Briggs – worked for the firm from 1874–1876
- Henry Budden – Australian architect who worked at the firm during the mid–1890s; partner of Kent & Budden
- John Hutchins Cady – worked at the firm from 1906–1907
- Henry Ives Cobb – worked at the firm from 1881–1882; partner of Cobb and Frost
- Charles Collens – apprentice for the firm; partner of Allen & Collens
- Charles Sumner Frost – worked at the firm from 1876–1881; partner of Cobb and Frost
- George A. Fuller – worked at the firm from 1876–1880 and became partner in charge of the New York City office. Left to start the George A. Fuller Company in Chicago. He is often credited as being the "inventor" of modern skyscrapers and the modern contracting system.
- Edward T. P. Graham – worked at the firm in 1904
- Charles R. Greco – worked at the firm from 1900–1907
- S. Wesley Haynes – started his own firm in 1918
- Burnham Hoyt – began career at the firm; later became professor at New York University and Dean of the School of Architecture
- Charles Wilson Killam – worked at the firm from 1887–1908, was the firm's chief architectural engineer; professor of architecture at Harvard University
- Westray Ladd – after working for he firm he practiced in Philadelphia
- Ellis F. Lawrence – apprenticed at the firm in 1902; co-founder and first dean of the University of Oregon's School of Architecture.
- Ion Lewis – worked at the firm after graduating from MIT until 1882; partner of Whidden & Lewis
- Louis Christian Mullgardt – worked at the firm around 1886
- Orlando Whitney Norcross – worked for the firm After H. H. Richardson's death; partner of Norcross Brothers
- Frederick Lincoln Savage – office boy and apprentice at the firm from 1884–1886
- Albert Cicero Schweinfurth – apprentice and draftsman at the firm from 1882–1883. His brothers Henry and Julius also worked at the firm
- Julius A. Schweinfurth – chief designer at the firm from 1879–1883 then from 1886–1895
- Timothy Francis Walsh – worked at the firm from 1887–1897; partner of Maginnis & Walsh
- Joseph Morrill Wells – worked at the firm from 1874–1875
- Edmund M. Wheelwright – worked at the firm in the late 1870s; served as City Architect of Boston from 1891–1895
- Arthur H. Vinal – apprenticed at the firm before starting his own practice in 1875; served as the first City Architect of Boston from 1884–1887

== Images ==
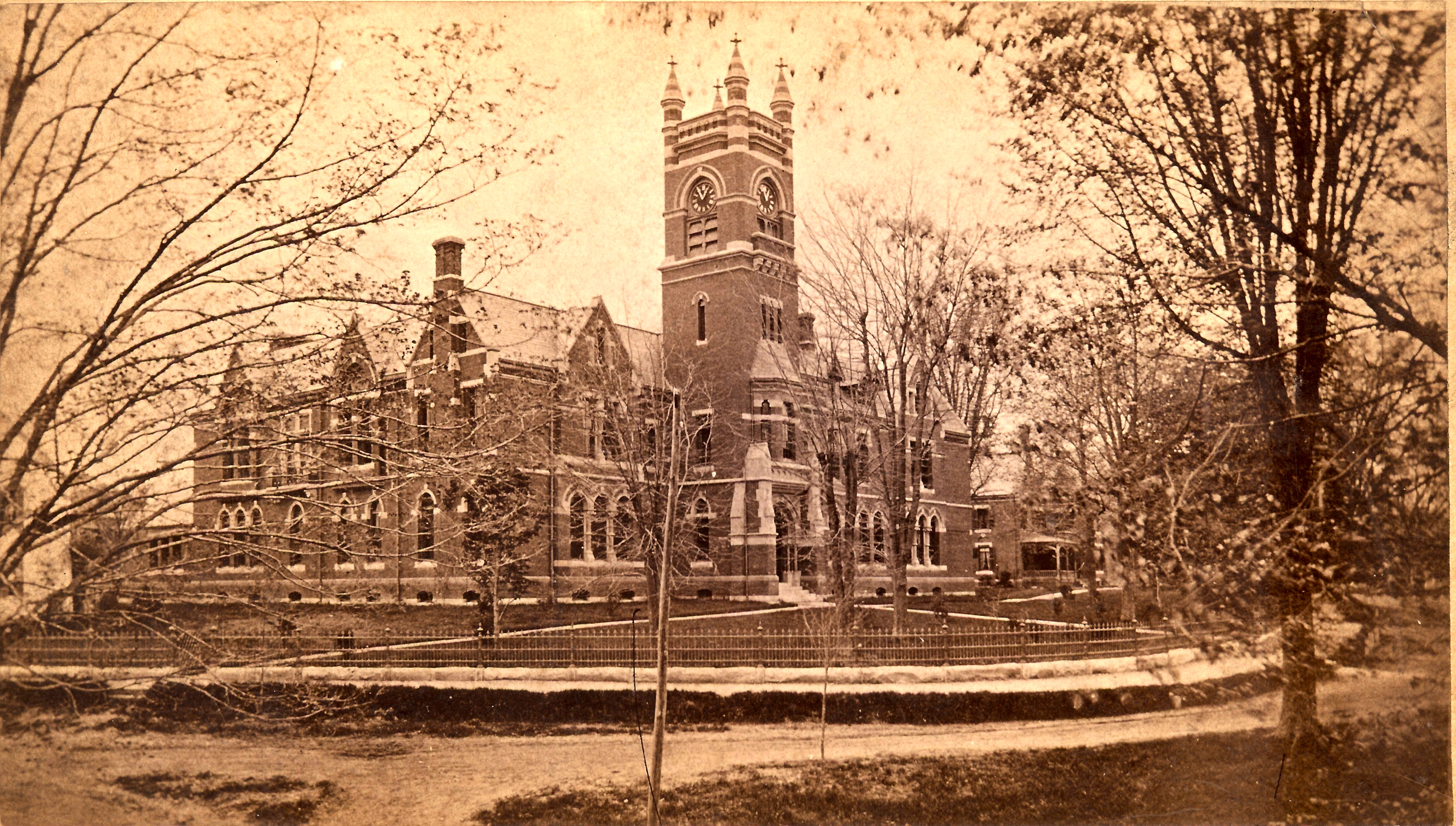
College Hall, Smith College, Northampton, MA, 1875

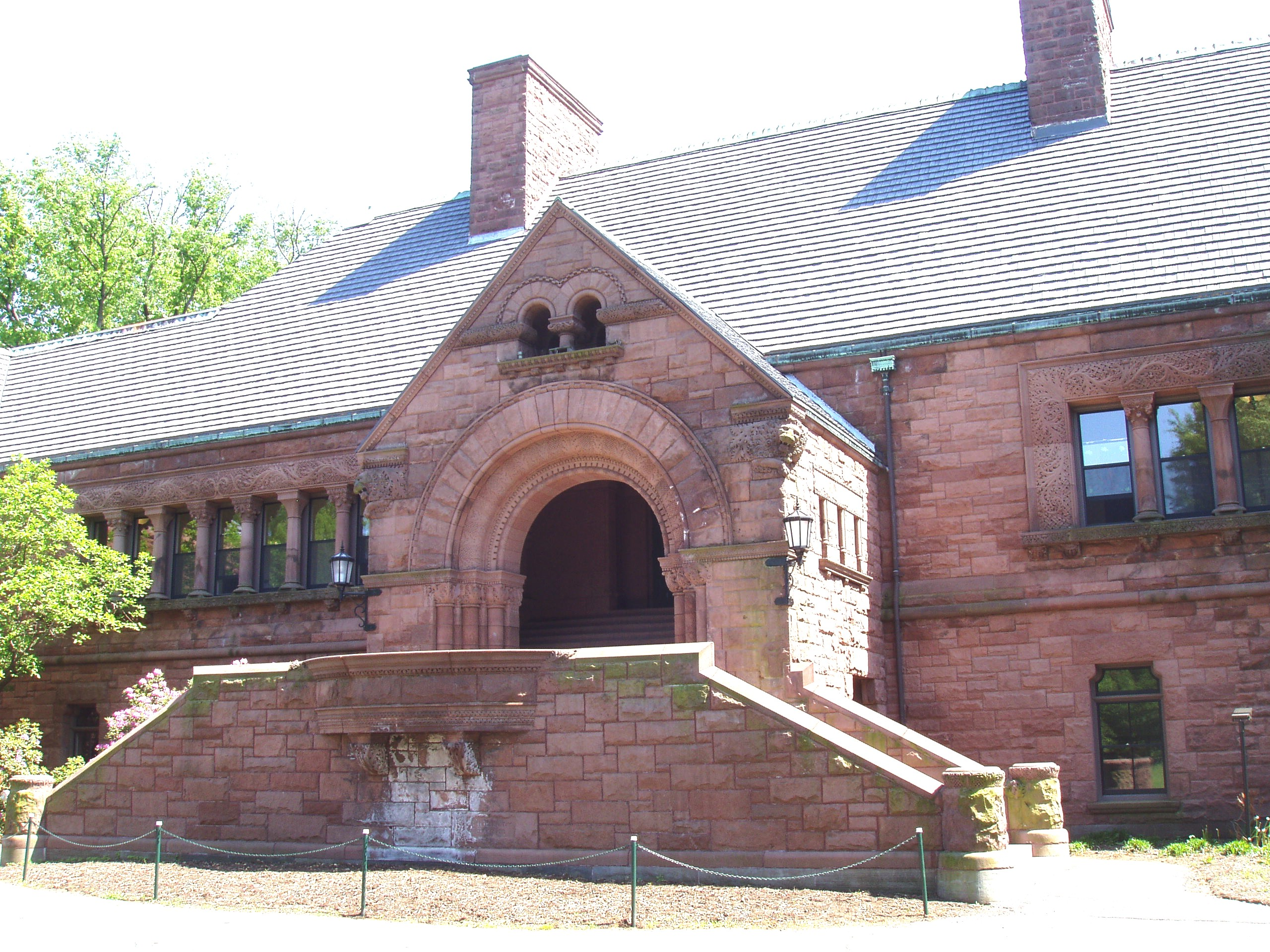
Memorial Hall, The Lawrenceville School

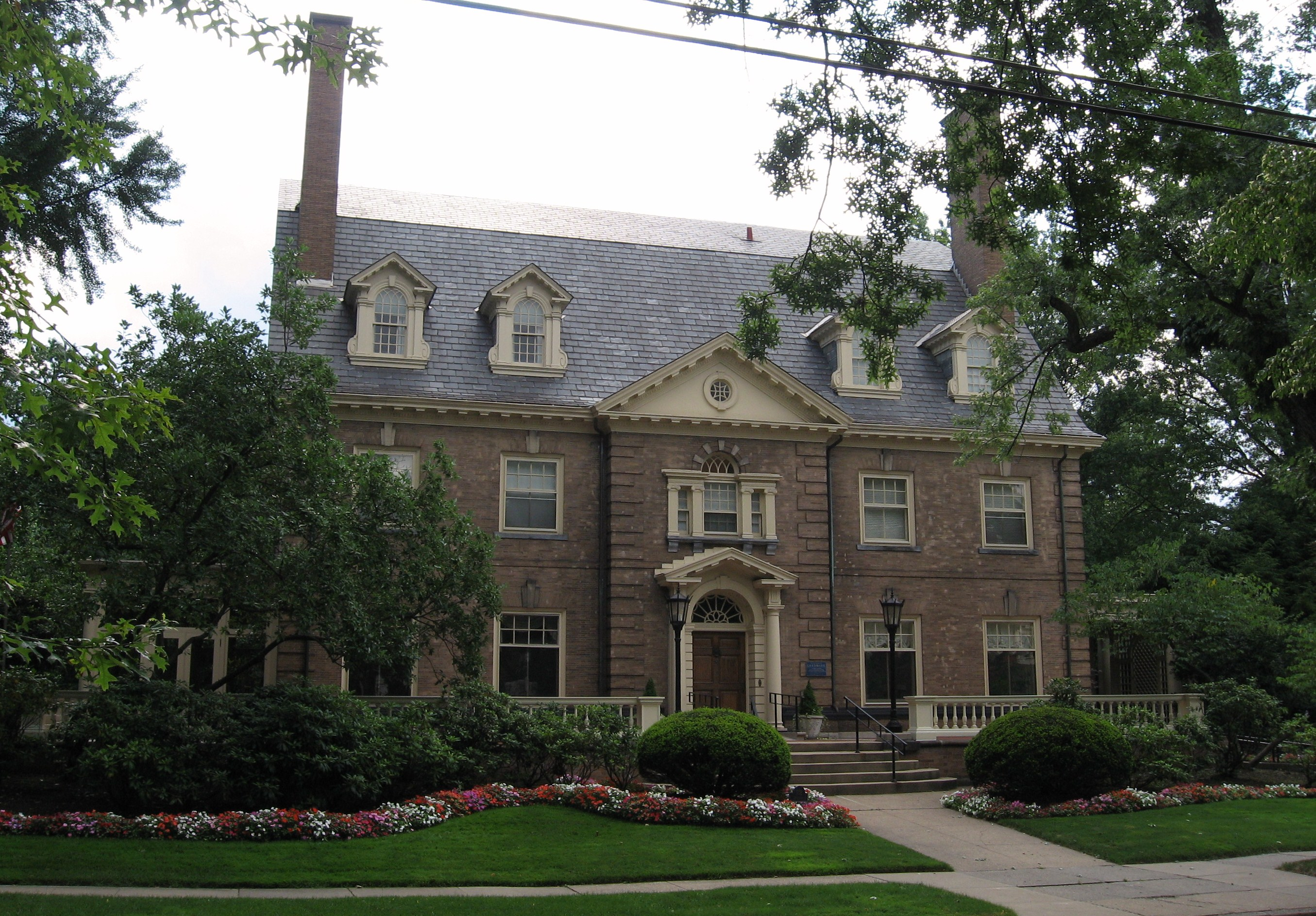
Harvey Childs house, now the University of Pittsburgh's Chancellor's Residence

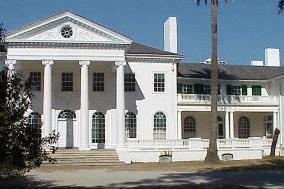
Plum Orchard, built 1898

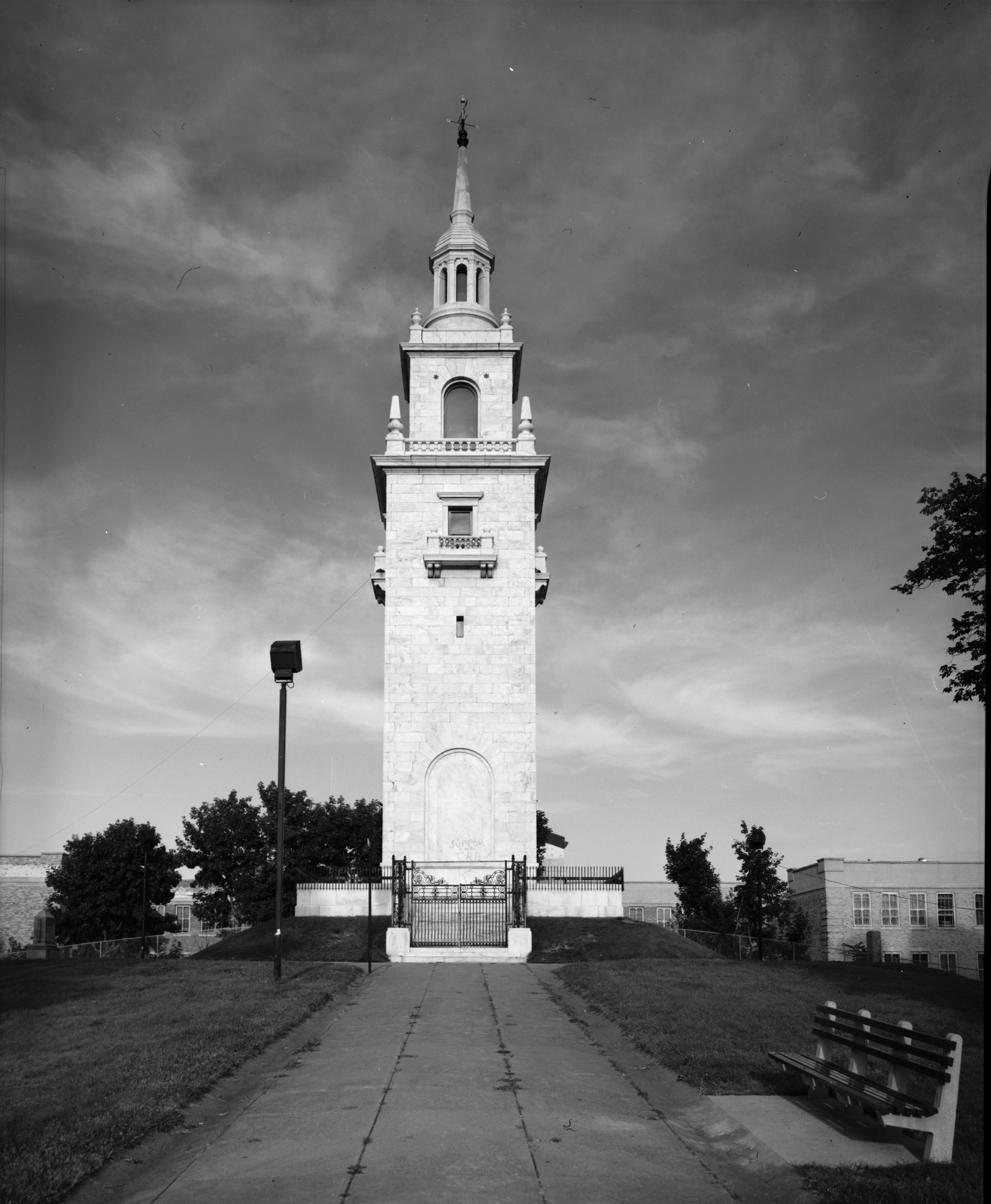
Dorchester Heights Monument

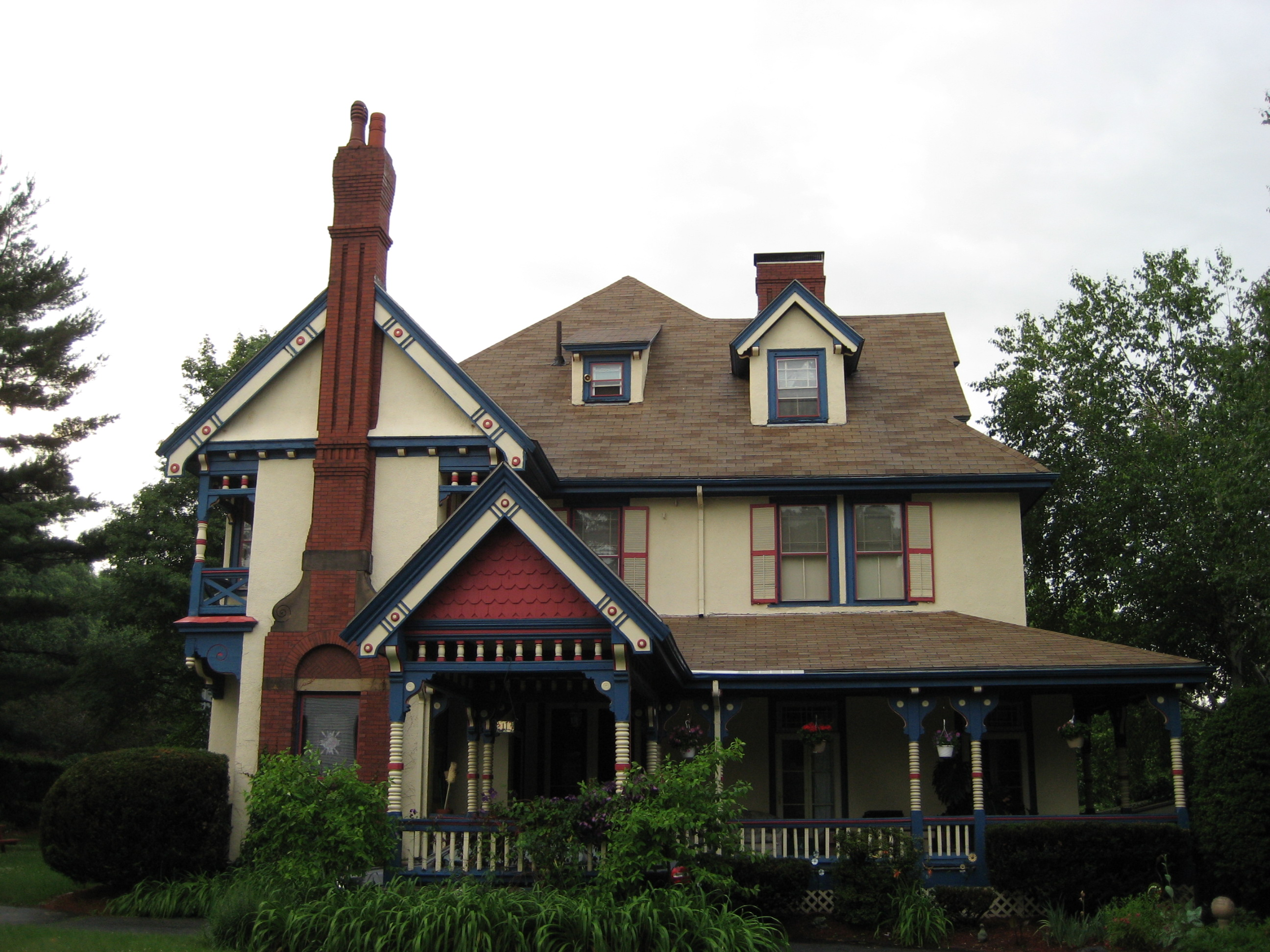
The Henry Bradlee Jr. House in Medford, Massachusetts

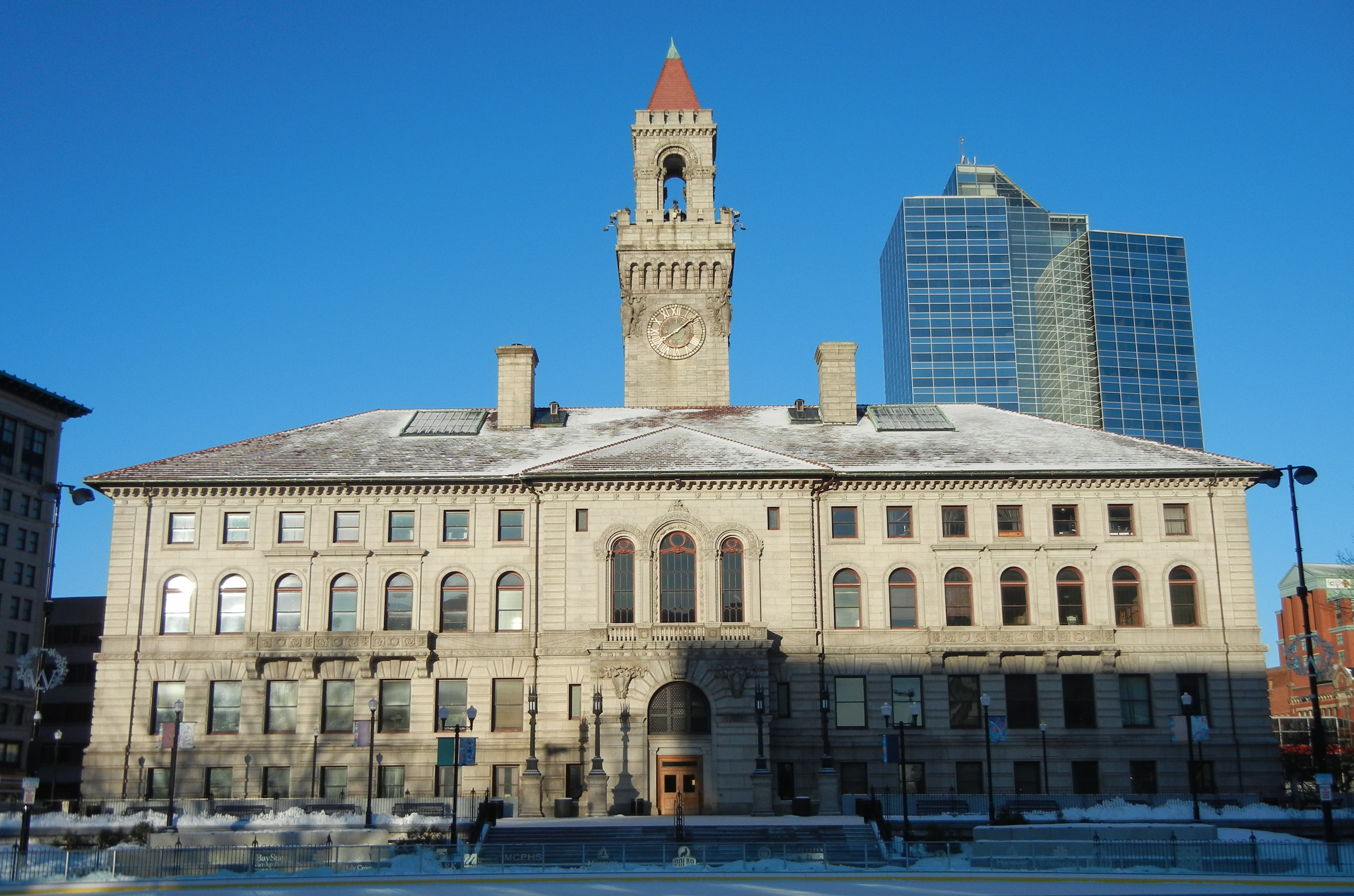
Worcester City Hall

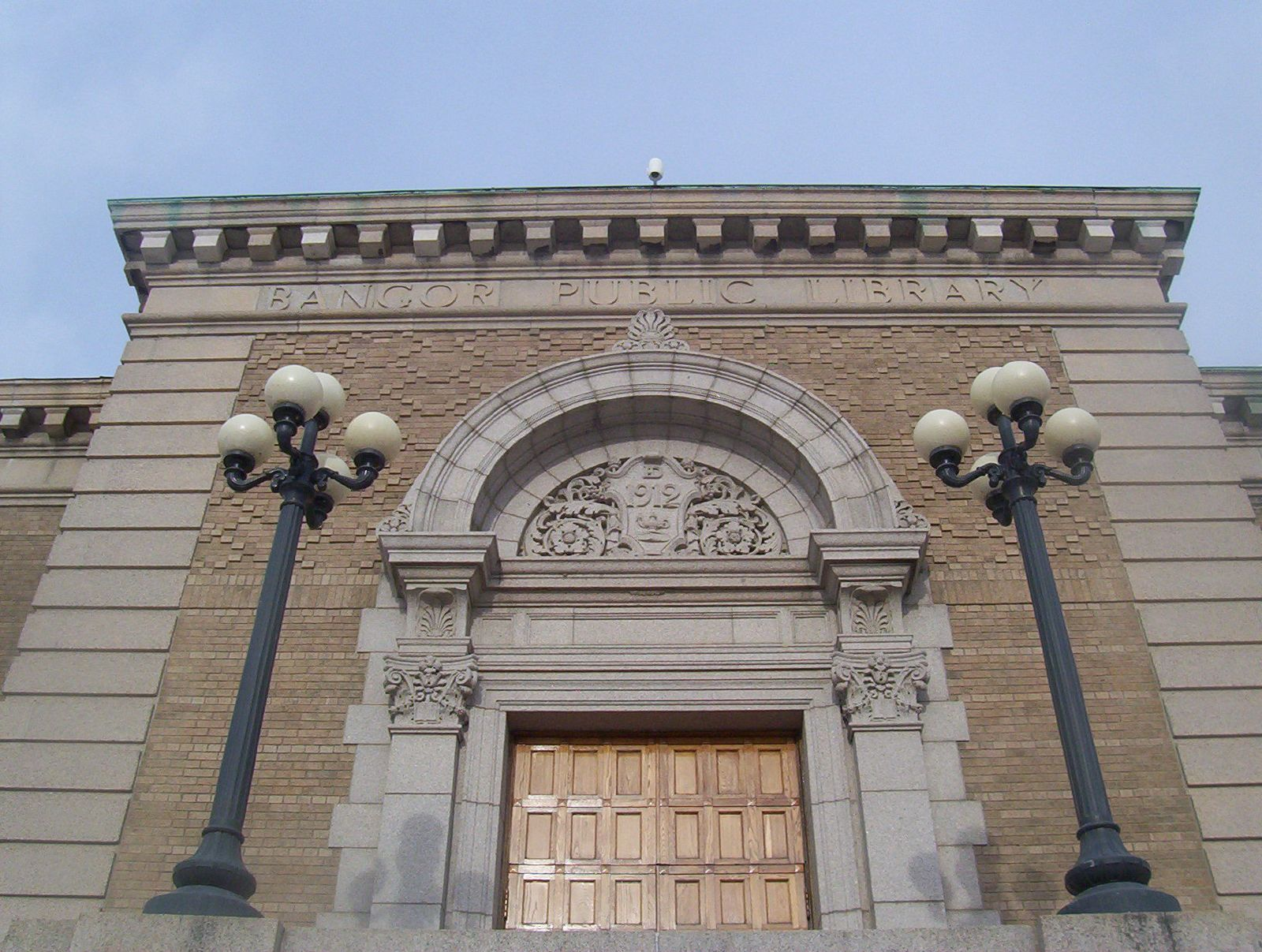
Bangor Public Library

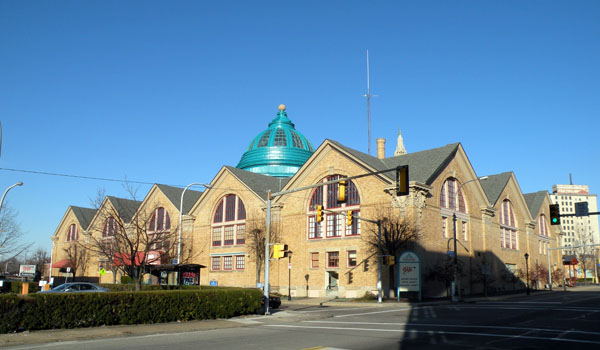
East Liberty Market, built in 1898–1900, and located in the East Liberty neighborhood of Pittsburgh, PA.

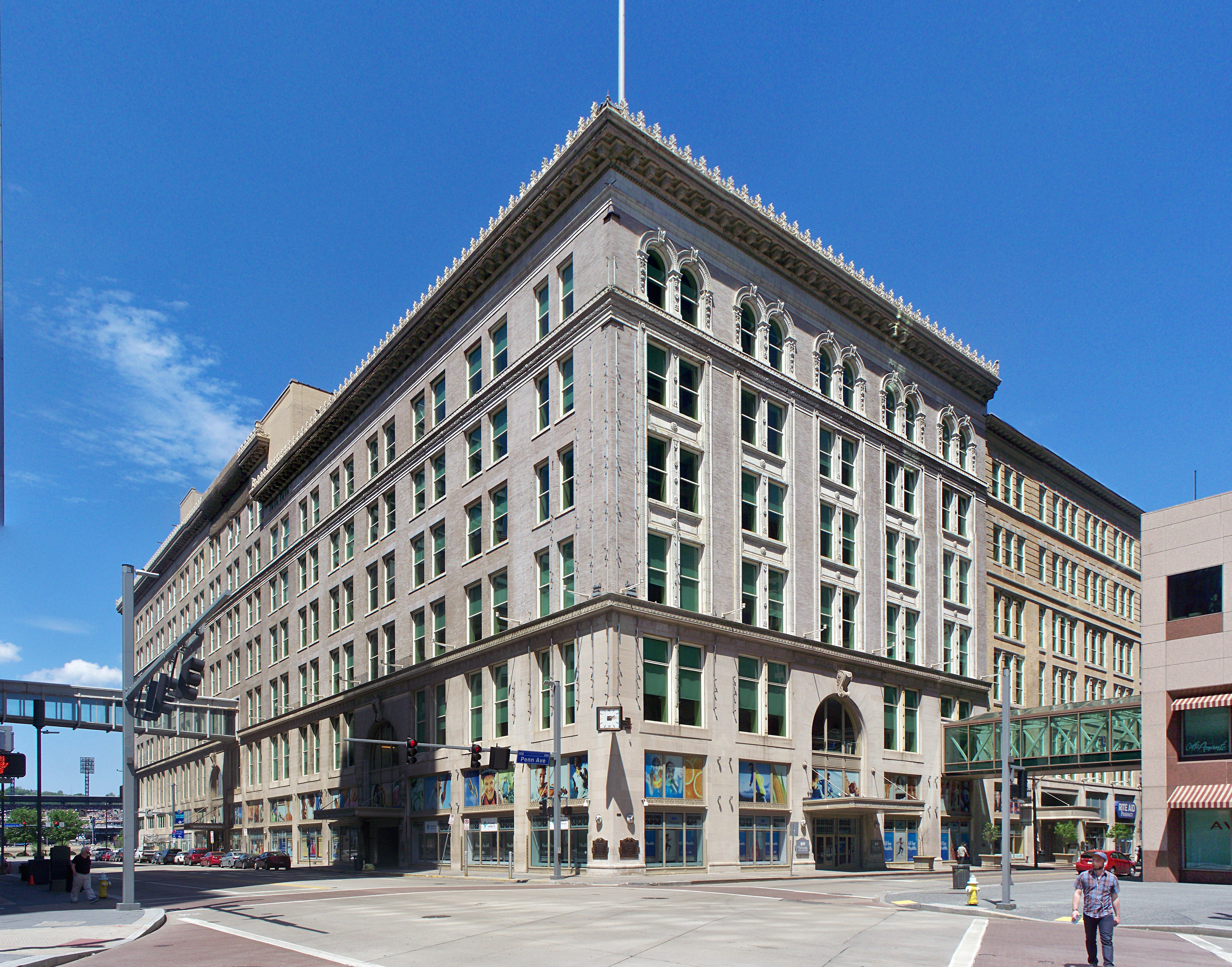
Joseph Horne Company Department Store in Downtown Pittsburgh, Pennsylvania, built in 1900 (with additions in 1923). Architects: Peabody & Stearns, and William S. Fraser.

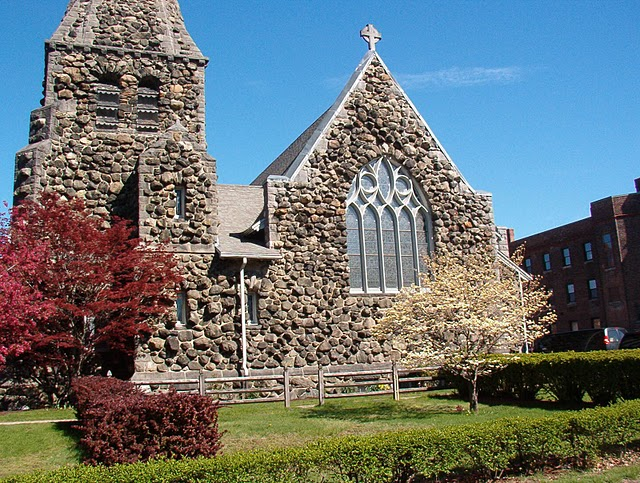
Christ Church in Waltham, Massachusetts
