= Westray Ladd =

American architect (1863–1909)

Westray Ladd (December 8, 1863 – August 15, 1909) was an American architect.

Ladd was born in Hong Kong to American parents. His family came back to Bucksport, Maine, when he was one. He worked in the office of Wheelwright & Haven in Boston, Massachusetts, as well as with William Emerson and Peabody & Stearns. In November 1883, he moved to Philadelphia and ran his own office until 1902. He worked mostly on residences including homes in Overbrook, where he lived. He was a member of the American Institute of Architects and of the T-Square Club.
