= Chancellor's Residence (University of Pittsburgh) =

Chancellor's Residence (Harvey Childs house)
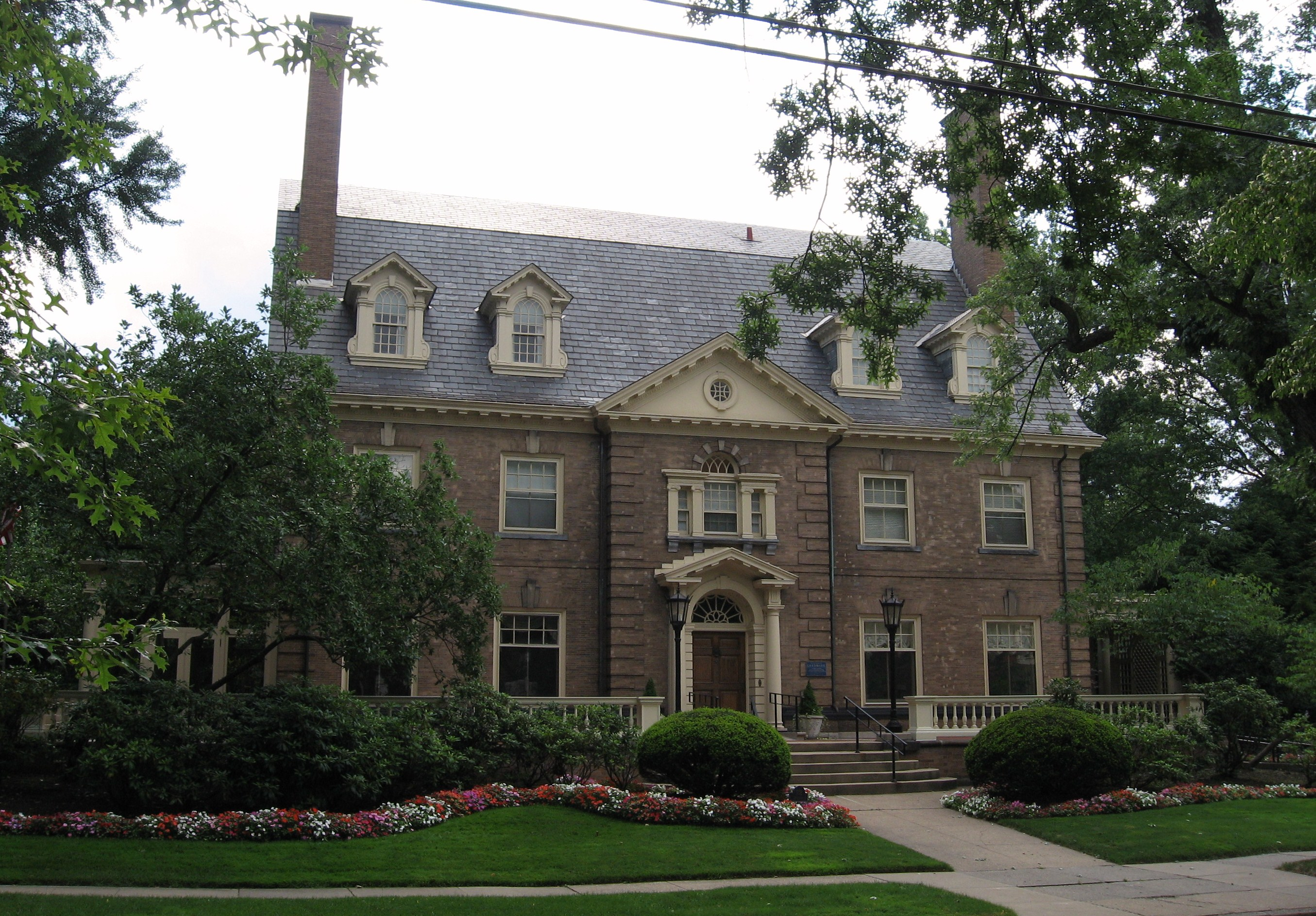
- Chancellor's Residence at the University of Pittsburgh, the former Harvey Childs house

- Location of the Pitt Chancellor's Residence in Pittsburgh
- 40.448937°N 79.944636°W
- Location: 718 Devonshire Street, Shadyside neighborhood of Pittsburgh, Pennsylvania

History
- Built: 1896

Site notes
- Architect: Peabody & Stearns
- Architectural style: Colonial Revival
- Governing body: University of Pittsburgh

Pittsburgh Landmark – PHLF
- Designated: 1973

The Chancellor's Residence at the University of Pittsburgh is a Pittsburgh History and Landmarks Foundation Historic Landmark in Shadyside just east of the main Oakland campus approximately one half mile from the center of campus at the Cathedral of Learning and adjacent to the rear property of the University Child Development Center on the Oakland-Shadyside border in Pittsburgh, Pennsylvania.

== Architecture ==
The residence is the former Harvey Childs house built by Peabody & Stearns in 1896. It is an example of Colonial Revival, with the gambrel roof especially suggestive of New England Colonial. However, the home also incorporates some details reminiscent of Philadelphia's Georgian-style Mount Pleasant mansion. The structure overcomes what was at the time an architectural problem of including a porch that Pittsburghers wanted, but preventing the porch from obscuring the facade toward the street. The design of this house worked around this problem by placing the porch to the side of the house, balanced by a porte-cochere. A renovation designed by Landmark Design Associates later enclosed the porch at the Chancellor's Residence.

== History ==
Harvey Childs, the original owner for whom the residence is sometimes named, was one of the three Pittsburgh citizens that played a role in the origins of the Allegheny Observatory and thus the early years of the university's Department of Astronomy and Physics. He also served as a trustee to the university, then called the Western University of Pennsylvania, from 1863 to 1876. The residence was also the home of John F. Casey, a University of Pittsburgh Trustee until his death in 1948. The home was given to the university to serve as a residence for its chancellor in 1966 by Leon Falk Jr. who served as vice chairman of the university's board of trustees. Pitt's previous chancellor's residence was on Morewood Heights in the Oakland neighborhood of Pittsburgh and was sold to the Catholic Institute of Pittsburgh proceeding Falk's gift.

Preceded by Music Building	University of Pittsburgh buildings Chancellor's Residence; Constructed: 1896	Succeeded by William Pitt Union
