= Hotel Alexandra (Boston) =

Historic building in Boston, Massachusetts

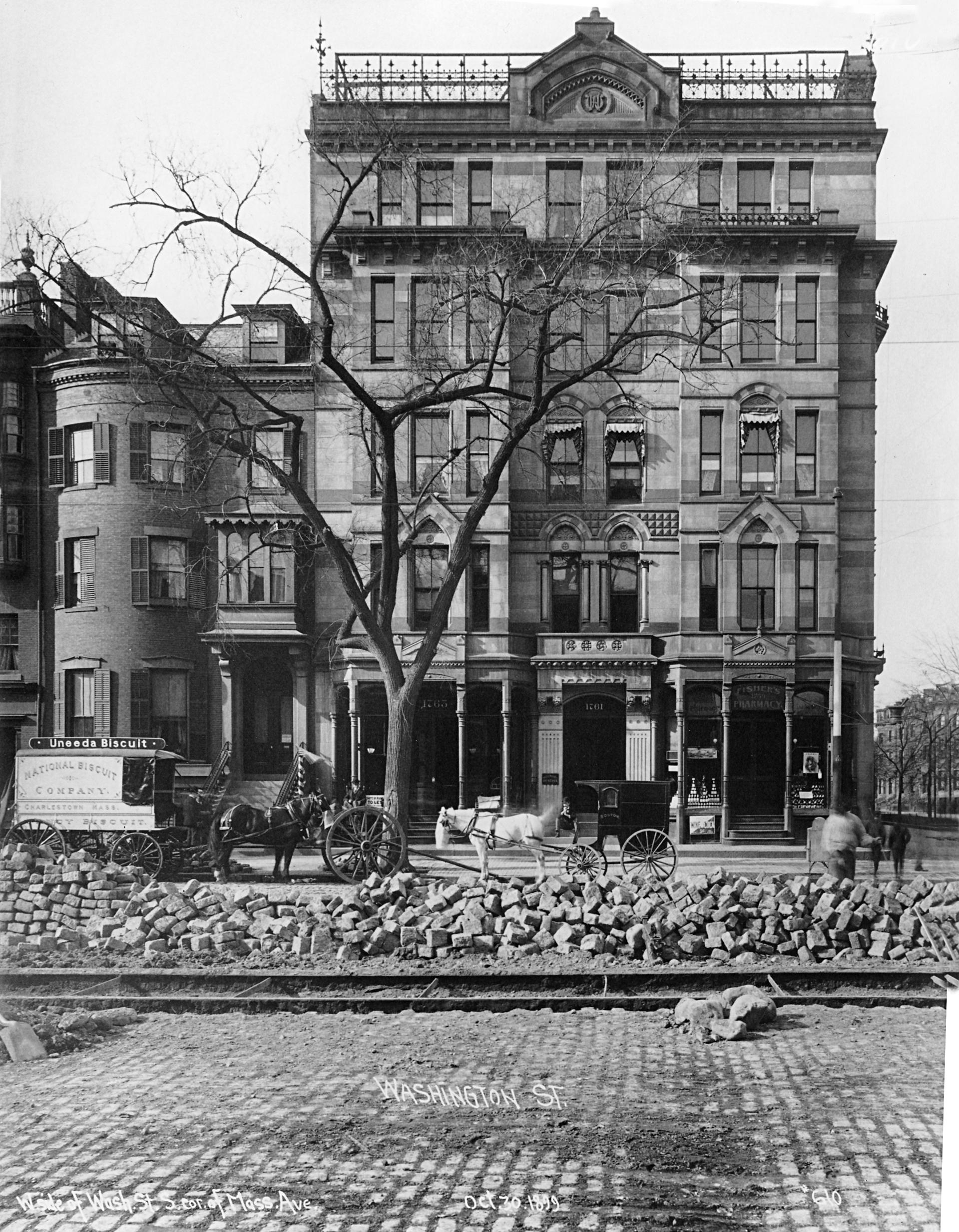
- Hotel Alexandra in 1899
- Interactive map of the Hotel Alexandra area
- Alternative names: Walworth Building

General information
- Status: Vacant
- Architectural style: High Victorian Gothic
- Location: South End District, 1759–1763 Washington St., Roxbury, Boston, Massachusetts, United States
- Coordinates: 42.3366°N 71.0775°W
- Named for: Alexandra of Denmark
- Opened: 1875

Technical details
- Floor count: 5

Design and construction
- Architect: Peabody & Stearns

Other information
- Number of rooms: 50
- Public transit: Silver Line (MBTA)

The Hotel Alexandra, also known historically as the Walworth Building, is a High Victorian Gothic structure built in the 1870s with a sandstone façade at the corner of Washington Street and Massachusetts Avenue in the Roxbury neighborhood of Boston, Massachusetts, United States. The structure is also deemed to be part of the South End Landmark District.

== History ==
The hotel was developed by the Walworth brothers who founded the Walworth Manufacturing Company which was a pioneer in steam technology in the late 19th century. This is likely the reason the hotel was equipped with a rare steam-powered elevator.

The hotel is of Victorian Heritage, as it was named after Alexandra of Denmark. The hotel was opened in 1875 to crowded cobblestone streets; the South End of Boston was barely 20 years old. The hotel originally stood prominently, especially since most of the buildings around it were warehouses. In the early 1900s, the hotel began a gradual desolation after the opening of an elevated railway, the Washington Street Elevated, immediately outside.

The architect of the Hotel Alexandra was discovered to be Peabody & Stearns, according to a short building permits report in the Suffolk County Journal.

== Redevelopment plans ==
The building in 2019

The hotel was increasingly vacant in the 1990s. As of November 1999, there were only "a couple of low-rent apartments on its upper floors" along with a couple of businesses operating in the building. The residential hotel, which featured 50 rooms and 2,000-square-foot (190 m^{2}) flats with high, elegant ceilings, was acquired by the Church of Scientology in 2008.

In 2018, Alexandra Partners LLC proposed restoring the historic façade of the hotel and constructing a 12-story hotel tower at the rear and side of the existing structure—the project received all the necessary approvals from city agencies in late 2019. In September 2020, the building was reportedly again placed on the market. In 2021, a revised proposal to develop 79 condominiums was approved. In 2024, another proposal similar to the 2018 plan, this time with a 13-story structure, received city approval.

As of early 2025, the building was still vacant, as none of the above proposals came to fruition. A new proposal to restore the hotel and add a five-story expansion, which would provide 68 total hotel rooms, was filed in April 2025.
