= The Breakers (1878) =

Vanderbilt mansion in Newport, Rhode Island destroyed by fire in 1892

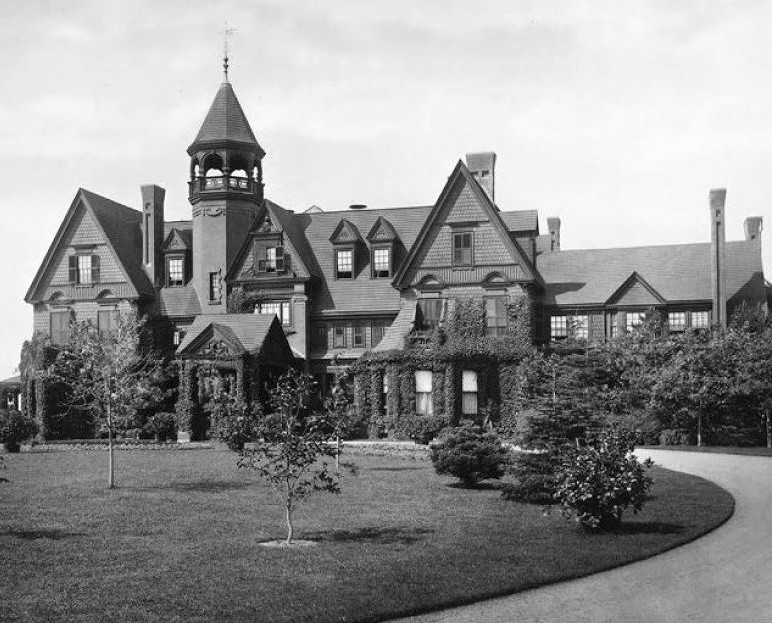

- Location within Rhode Island

General information
- Architectural style: Queen Anne
- Location: Ruggles Avenue, Ochre Point, Newport, Rhode Island, U.S.
- Coordinates: 41°28′11″N 71°17′55″W
- Completed: 1878
- Destroyed: 1892
- Owner: Pierre Lorillard IV; Cornelius Vanderbilt II

Design and construction
- Architect: Peabody and Stearns

The Breakers (built in 1878) was a Queen Anne style cottage designed by Peabody and Stearns for Pierre Lorillard IV and located along the Cliff Walk on Ochre Point Avenue, Newport, Rhode Island. In 1883, it was referred to as "unquestionably the most magnificent estate in Newport."

The home, which was acquired by Cornelius Vanderbilt II in 1885, was destroyed by fire in 1892 and replaced by the current Breakers. While only extant for 14 years, it "was widely known in the nineteenth century and continues to attract the attention of architectural historians today."

== History ==
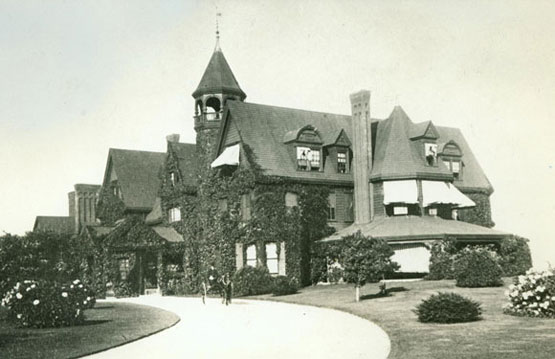
Side view of the original Lorillard cottage

On August 28, 1877, Pierre Lorillard IV paid $96,147 for 10 acres (480,736 square feet) on Ochre Point from Gov. William Beach Lawrence, through Alfred Smith. Lawrence had originally acquired 60 acres for $12,000 in 1850 from Newport farmer George Armstrong. Lorillard, of the extremely wealthy Lorillard Tobacco Company family, named their most popular cigarette after the town, Newport.

Lorillard hired Peabody and Stearns who designed the residence in the Queen Anne style, construction began in 1877 and was completed in 1878 at a cost of $90,000. The landscaping was designed by Ernest Bowditch. The Breakers was notable for its high tower and steeply-gabled roof forms. During its construction, Peabody described the structure to the Newport Mercury as carrying "out fully the English design ... The house throughout is furnished with heavy plate glass, and on the first floor the windows are all nearly French [doors] ... When house and grounds are finished, the Lorillard estate will be among the most handsome of the multitude of handsome estates which Newport contains."

Upon its completion, the exterior of the home was described in The New York Times as follows:

It is eligibly situated on Ochre Point, and is 181 feet long, 84 feet wide and three stories high. The underpinning was Cape Ann granite and the exterior was Philadelphia brick, laid in red mortar, with trimmings of Nova Scotia and North River blue-stone. The roof is gothic, and is indented with high peaks, gables and dormer windows. At the side of the front entrance is a large octagonal brick tower, rising high above the roof, and surmounted by a gilded vane. The lookout at the top is reached by a spiral staircase. On nearly all sides are broad piazzas with flooring of Philadelphia brick and tiles bordered with blue-stone.

Peabody and Stearns also designed a detached cottage that was built with the mansion in 1877 and used as a children's playhouse. This building survived the 1892 fire and is still standing on the grounds of The Breakers. It is open for tours on the grounds of the current mansion. In 1879, Lorillard purchased an additional three quarters of an acre (45,138 square feet) for $10,000 from Lawrence. Also in 1879, Lorillard helped found the Newport Casino.

The estate and partnership between Lorillard and Peabody and Stearns may have led Lorillard's cousin, philanthropist Catharine Lorillard Wolfe, to purchase the property next door to his and to hire Peabody and Stearns to build her Vinland estate in 1882. The property acquired for $200,000, also from the estate of Gov. Lawrence, featured a Romanesque Revival style exterior consisting of red sandstone with Aesthetic Movement style elements. After her death in 1896, the estate was also sold to a Vanderbilt descendant, Florence Adele Vanderbilt Twombly and her husband, Hamilton McKown Twombly.

=== Vanderbilt ownership ===
Rumors persisted for several years that the Lorillard estate was to be sold. In October 1883, it was reported that Cornelius Vanderbilt II purchased the "house and grounds, with all improvements" for an amount between $400,000 and $500,000. Lorillard actually sold the house in October 1885 to Vanderbilt for $400,000, in what was then the largest real estate deal ever made there. A week earlier, James Cook Ayer had offered Lorillard $375,000 for the property. Lorillard was interested in race horses and found that the Newport property lacked the space he needed. After the sale, he used the proceeds to buy an "undeveloped tract of hilly lakeside land about an hour northwest of New York" where he developed what would become Tuxedo Park, New York, a community of "rustic, shingle-style 'cottages' that would blend in with the beautiful wilderness setting."

After acquiring the property, Vanderbilt rehired Peabody and Stearns to remodel the building, becoming the first of many Vanderbilts to own property in Newport. Reportedly, Vanderbilt spent an additional $500,000 improving the estate over the next five years, with 80 men alone working on the renovations in 1886 which included tearing down a kitchen to make space for an elegant dining room and new building for the displaced kitchen. The new dining room, at 40 feet by 70 feet was the largest in Newport.

=== 1892 fire and rebuilding ===
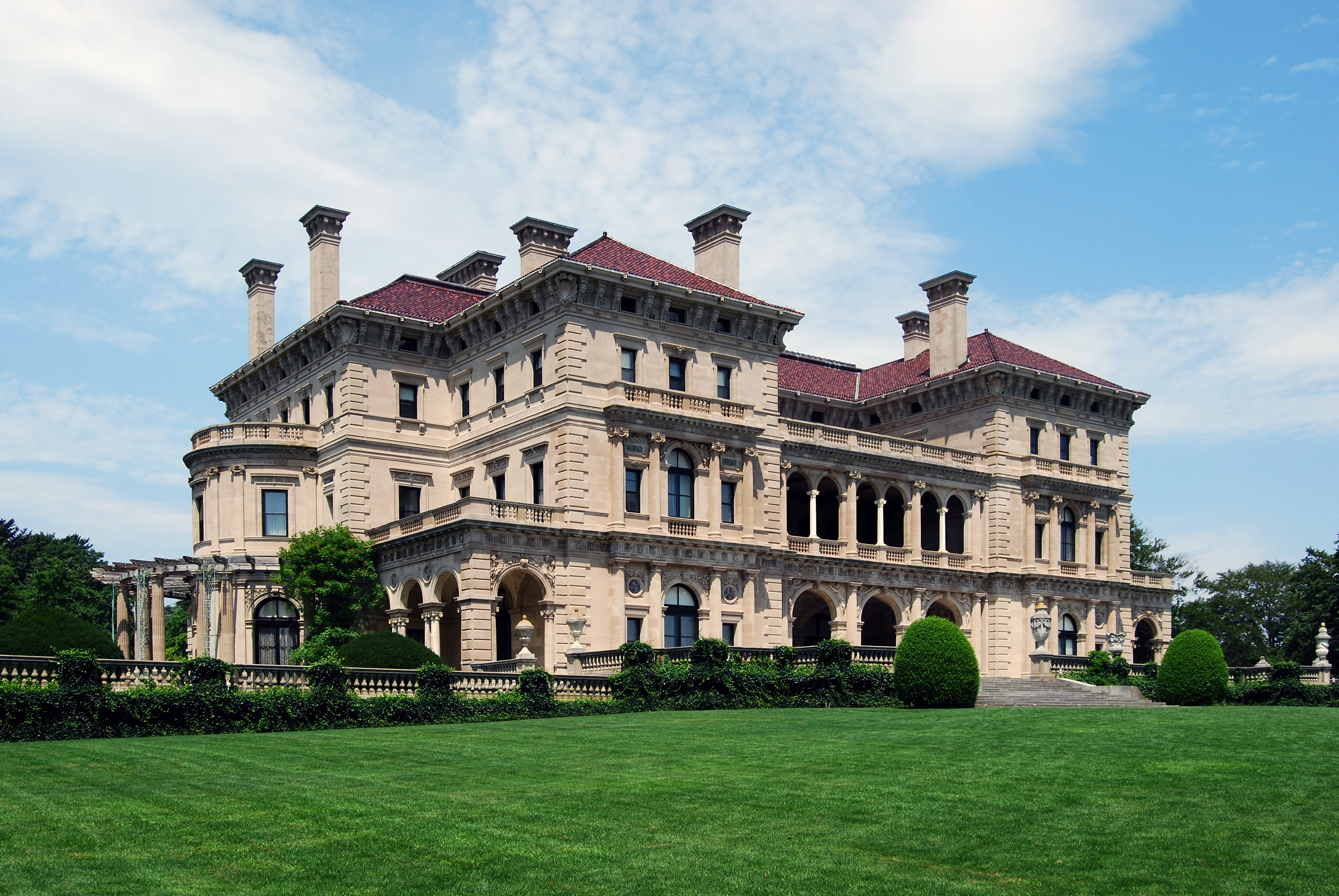
The Breakers, built in 1893, which replaced the original Breakers

The brick and shingle structure was destroyed by a fire, which started in the kitchen, in November 1892. The family, including Cornelius, Alice, Gertrude and Gladys, had been staying at the house for the Christmas holiday. At the time, Vanderbilt stated that the house was insured for $125,000, the furniture for $75,000 and the boiler for $10,000, a total of $210,000, at least several hundred thousand dollars less than what it was worth. In the wreckage, workers found two safes which contained his wife's jewelry that were only minimally damaged from the intense heat.

Vanderbilt replaced the 1878 residence with the massive and now more well-known The Breakers, designed by Richard Morris Hunt and constructed between 1893 and 1895. This new structure became a 70-room mansion with a gross area of 125,339 square feet (11,644.4 m^{2}) and 62,482 square feet (5,804.8 m^{2}) of living area on five floors that is today owned and operated by the Preservation Society of Newport County.

== See also ==
- The Breakers
- Vinland
