= Antler (disambiguation) =

An antler is the large horn-like appendage of deer or related species.

Antler or Antlers may also refer to:

== People ==
- Antler (poet) (born 1946), American poet who lives in Wisconsin

== Places ==
In Canada

- Rural Municipality of Antler No. 61, Saskatchewan
  - Antler, Saskatchewan

In the United States

- Antlers, Colorado
- Antler, Missouri
- Antler, North Dakota
- Antlers, Oklahoma
- Antler, West Virginia

== Other ==
- Antler (brand), a brand of suitcase
- Antlers (band), a black metal band based in Germany
- Antlers (Pillow Pal), a Pillow Pal moose made by Ty, Inc.
- The Antlers (University of Missouri), a student cheering section at University of Missouri basketball games
- The Antlers (band), an indie rock band based in Brooklyn
- Antlers Hotel (Colorado Springs, Colorado), also known as The Antlers
- Kashima Antlers, a J. League football team
- Antler Peak, a prominent mountain peak in Yellowstone National Park
- Deer horn knives, a martial arts weapon sometimes called deer antlers
- Antlers (2007 film), (a.k.a. Panache), a 2007 Canadian documentary film
- Antlers (2021 film), a 2021 supernatural horror film
- Antler (venture capital firm)

== See also ==
- ANTLR
- Antlers Hotel (disambiguation)
