= Antlers Hotel =

Antlers Hotel may refer to:

- Antlers Hotel (Colorado Springs, Colorado), also known as The Antlers
- Antlers Hotel (Spirit Lake, Iowa), listed on the National Register of Historic Places (NRHP)
- Antlers Hotel (Raquette Lake, New York)
- Antlers Hotel (Lorain, Ohio), listed on the NRHP
- Antlers Hotel (Kingsland, Texas)

== See also ==
- Antler (disambiguation) (which includes places named "The Antlers")
