= Hudson Hall =

Hudson Hall most commonly refers to:

- Hudson Hall (arts organization), an arts venue in Hudson, New York
- Hudson Hall (University of Missouri), a dormitory at the University of Missouri
