= Pierce P. Furber =

American architect (1853–1893)

Pierce P. Furber FAIA
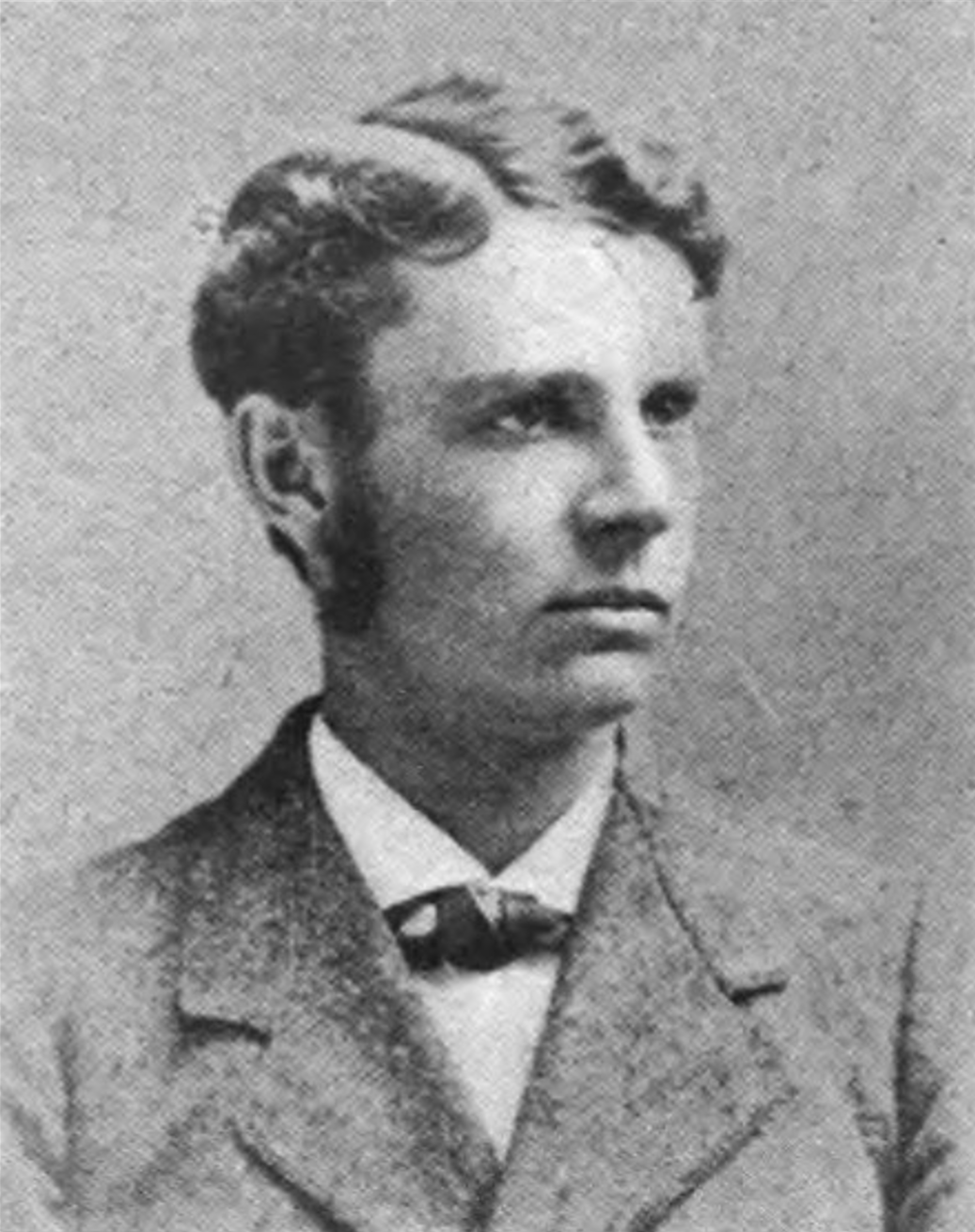
- Born: May 2, 1853; Bangor, Maine, U.S.
- Died: April 6, 1893 (aged 39); St. Louis, Missouri, U.S.
- Burial place: Bellefontaine Cemetery
- Education: Carleton College (1871); University of Minnesota (1875); Massachusetts Institute of Technology (1879)
- Occupation: Architect
- Relatives: Joseph W. Furber (uncle); Aurilla Furber (cousin)
- Practice: Peabody, Stearns & Furber
- Buildings: The Antlers; Dr. George Ashe Bronson House; James J. Hill House; Duluth Union Depot; Security Building

1st President of St. Louis chapter of the American Institute of Architects
- In office 1890–1891
- Succeeded by: William S. Eames

Pierce Powers Furber (May 2, 1853 – April 6, 1893) was an American architect and partner of Peabody & Stearns in charge of the firm's western commissions under the name Peabody, Stearns & Furber.

== Biography ==
Furber was born May 2, 1853, in Bangor, Maine, to Samuel Winkley Furber (1819–1895) and Lucy Heywood Metcalf (1825–1856). He moved to Saint Paul, Minnesota with his father in 1858, then moved to Cottage Grove, Minnesota in 1861 where his uncle, Joseph W. Furber, was living at the time. His father was one of James J. Hill's business associates. Furber was educated at Carleton College (1871) and the University of Minnesota (1875) where he graduated as civil engineer in 1876. He was a charter member of the Alpha Nu chapter of Chi Psi. Furber attended the Massachusetts Institute of Technology and graduated as an architect in 1879.

Following graduation, he entered the Boston offices of Peabody & Stearns. In 1881, he was sent by the firm to Colorado Springs to superintend the firm's projects there. In 1883, Furber went to St. Louis where he became in charge of all the firm's western work and became a local partner of the firm in 1889, under the name Peabody, Stearns & Furber. Furber's role "was to drum up trade for the Boston office and supervise construction from drawings that they sent him."

Furber was a founder of the Architectural League of New York and on the board of directors of the American Institute of Architects. Furber was elected a Fellow of the American Institute of Architects in 1889. He was the first president of the St. Louis AIA chapter.

Furber married Sara Kate Montgomery on November 15, 1882, and had three children. He died April 6, 1893, in St. Louis from diphtheria. He was buried at Bellefontaine Cemetery.

== Works ==
- Chi Psi Alpha Nu Chapter Lodge, 1515 University Avenue SE, Minneapolis, Minnesota
- Henry L. Newman House (1881) – 21 Vandeventer Place, Central West End, St. Louis, Missouri, demolished
- Turner Building (1882) – 304 N 8th Street, St. Louis, Missouri, demolished
- U.S. Signal Station (1882) – Pikes Peak, El Paso County, Colorado, demolished
- The Antlers Hotel (1883) – Cascade Avenue, Colorado Springs, Colorado, demolished
- Isaac W. Morton House (1884) – 49 Vandeventer Place & Cabanne Avenue, Central West End, St. Louis, Missouri, demolished
- St. Louis Club House (1884–1885) – T. E. Huntley Avenue & Locust Boulevard, Midtown, St. Louis, Missouri, demolished
- Dr. George Ashe Bronson House (1885) – 3201 Washington Avenue, St. Louis, Missouri, added to the NRHP in 2015
- Robert Moore House (1886) – 61 Vandeventer Place, Central West End, St. Louis, Missouri, demolished
- Thomas Howard House (1887) – 33 Vandeventer Place, Central West End, St. Louis, Missouri, demolished
- James J. Hill House (1887–1891) – 240 Summit Avenue, Saint Paul, Minnesota, added to the NRHP in 1966
- Henry L. Newman House (1889) – 21 Westmoreland Place, Central West End, St. Louis, Missouri, demolished
- Duluth Union Depot (1890–1892) – 509 W Michigan Street, Duluth, Minnesota, added to the NRHP in 1971
- Security Building (1890–1892) – 319 N 4th Street, St. Louis, Missouri, added to the NRHP in 2000
- Corinne Dyer House (1892) – 38 Westmoreland Place, Central West End, St. Louis, Missouri
- Col. Edward C. Rowse House (1892) – 10 Benton Place, Lafayette Square, St. Louis, Missouri
- Lindell Methodist Episcopal Church (1892) – Lindell Boulevard & Newstead Avenue, St. Louis, Missouri, demolished
- The Collier Building (1892–1893) – 4th Street & Washington Avenue, St. Louis, Missouri, demolished
- John T. Davis House (1893–1894) – 17 Westmoreland Place, Central West End, St. Louis, Missouri
- D. R. Wolfe House (1894) – 4046 Washington Avenue, Central West End, St. Louis, Missouri
- George M. Maverick House (1894) – 2726 Locust Street, Midtown, St. Louis, Missouri, demolished

== Gallery ==
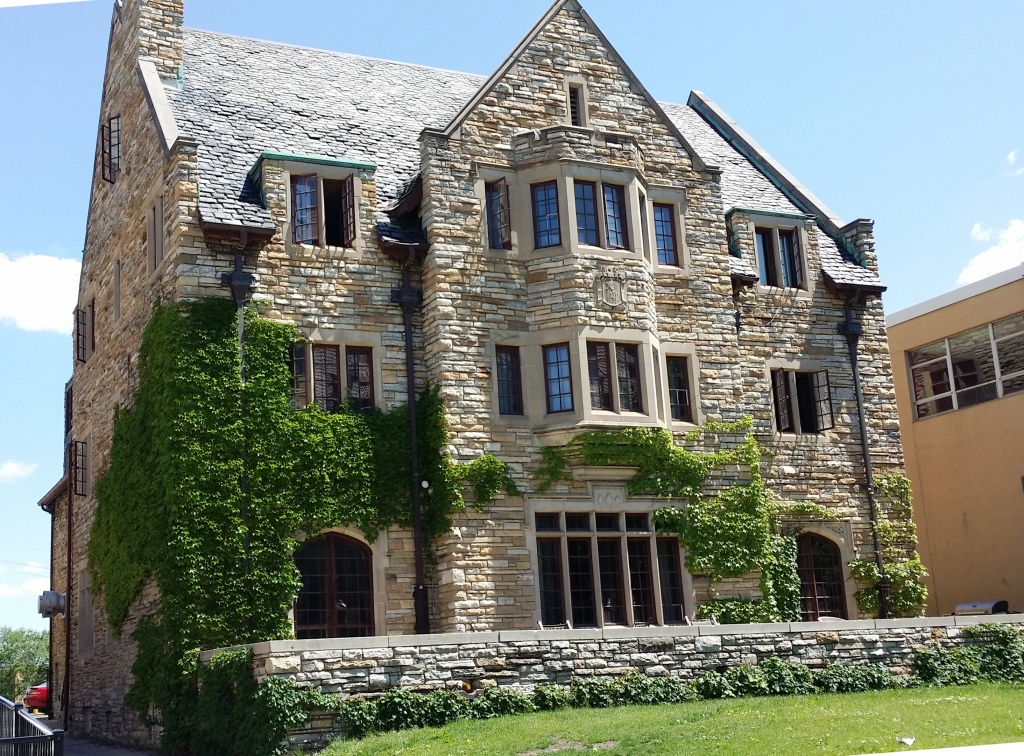
Alpha Nu Lodge

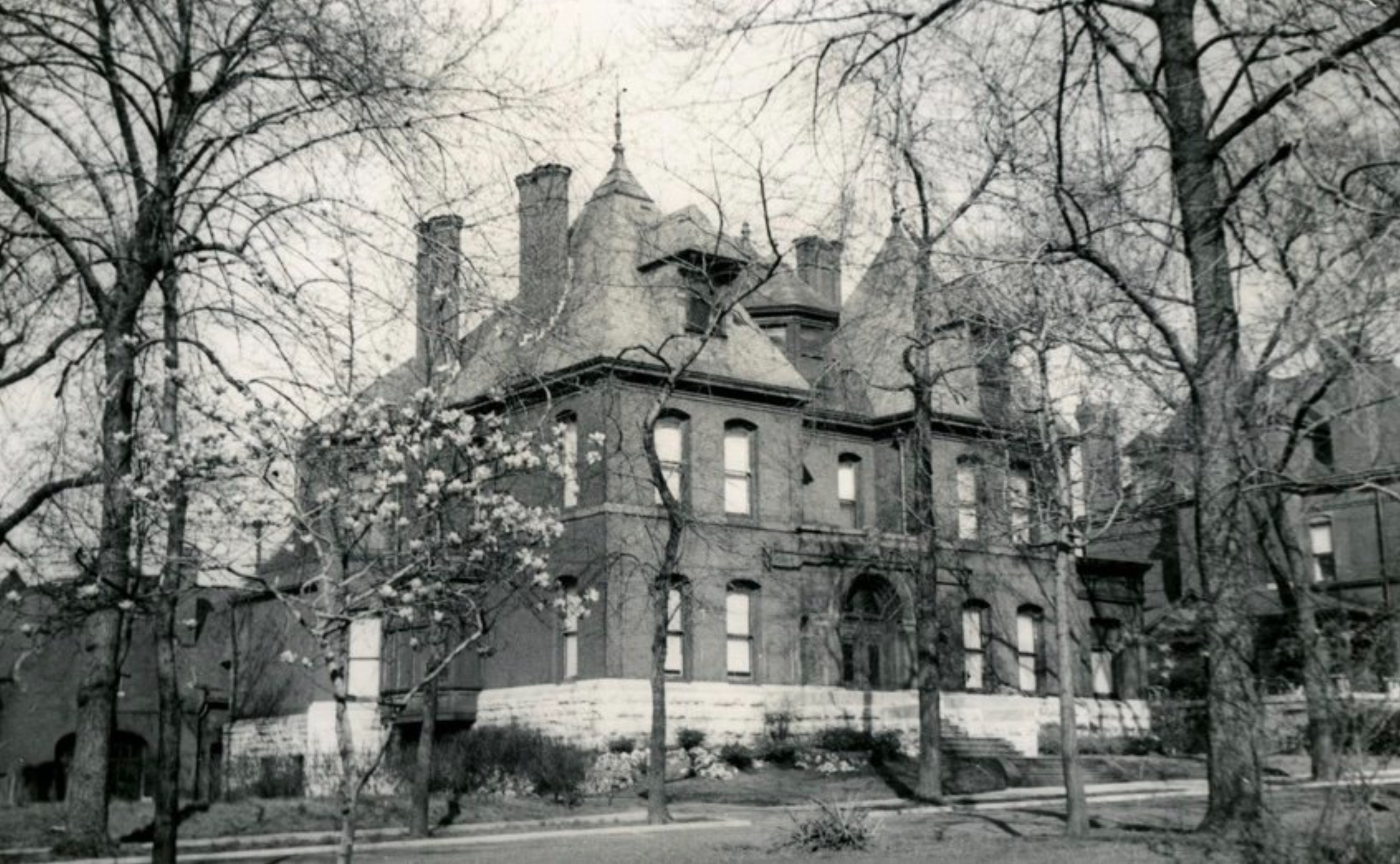
21 Vandeventer Place

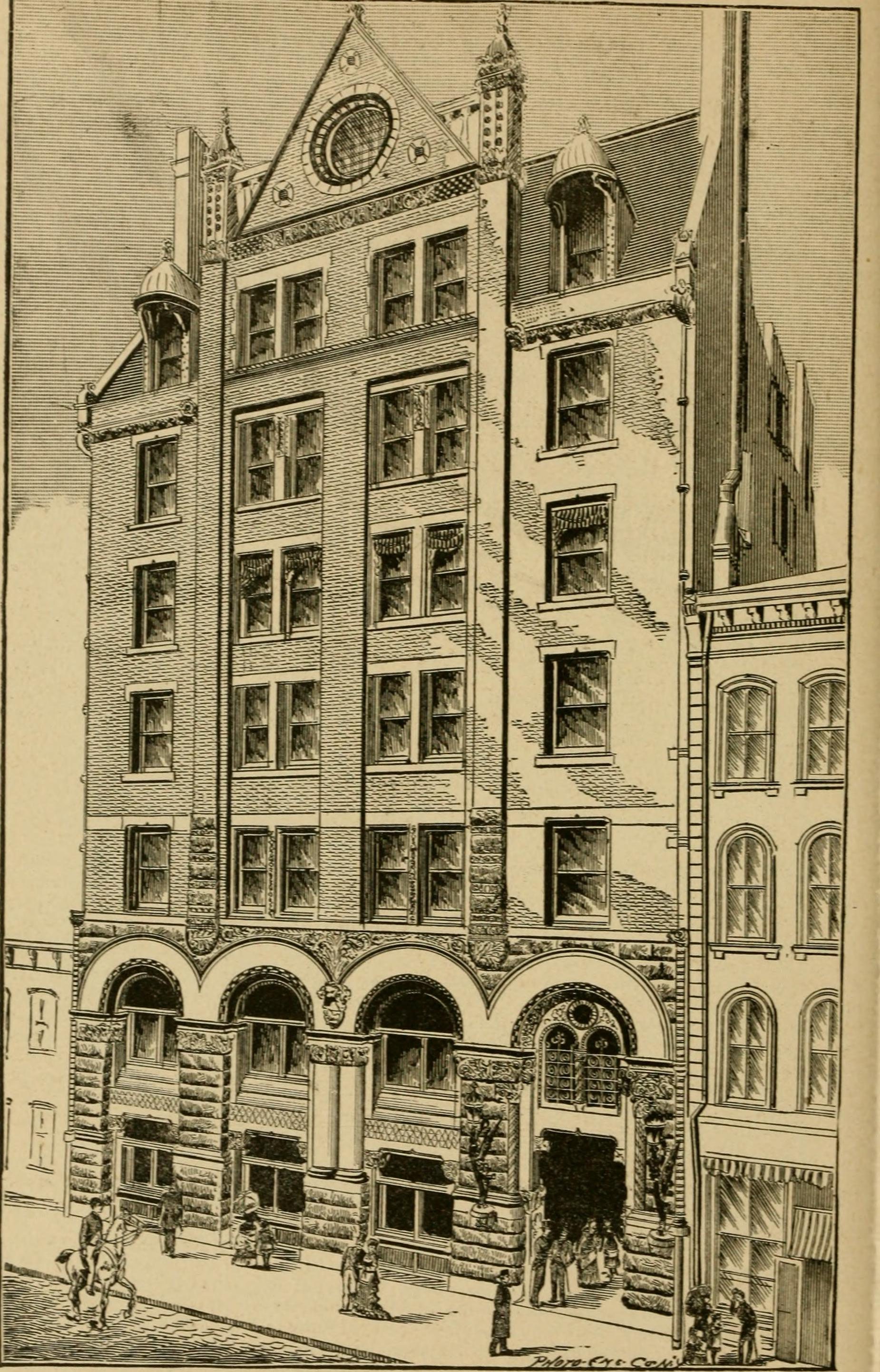
Turner Building

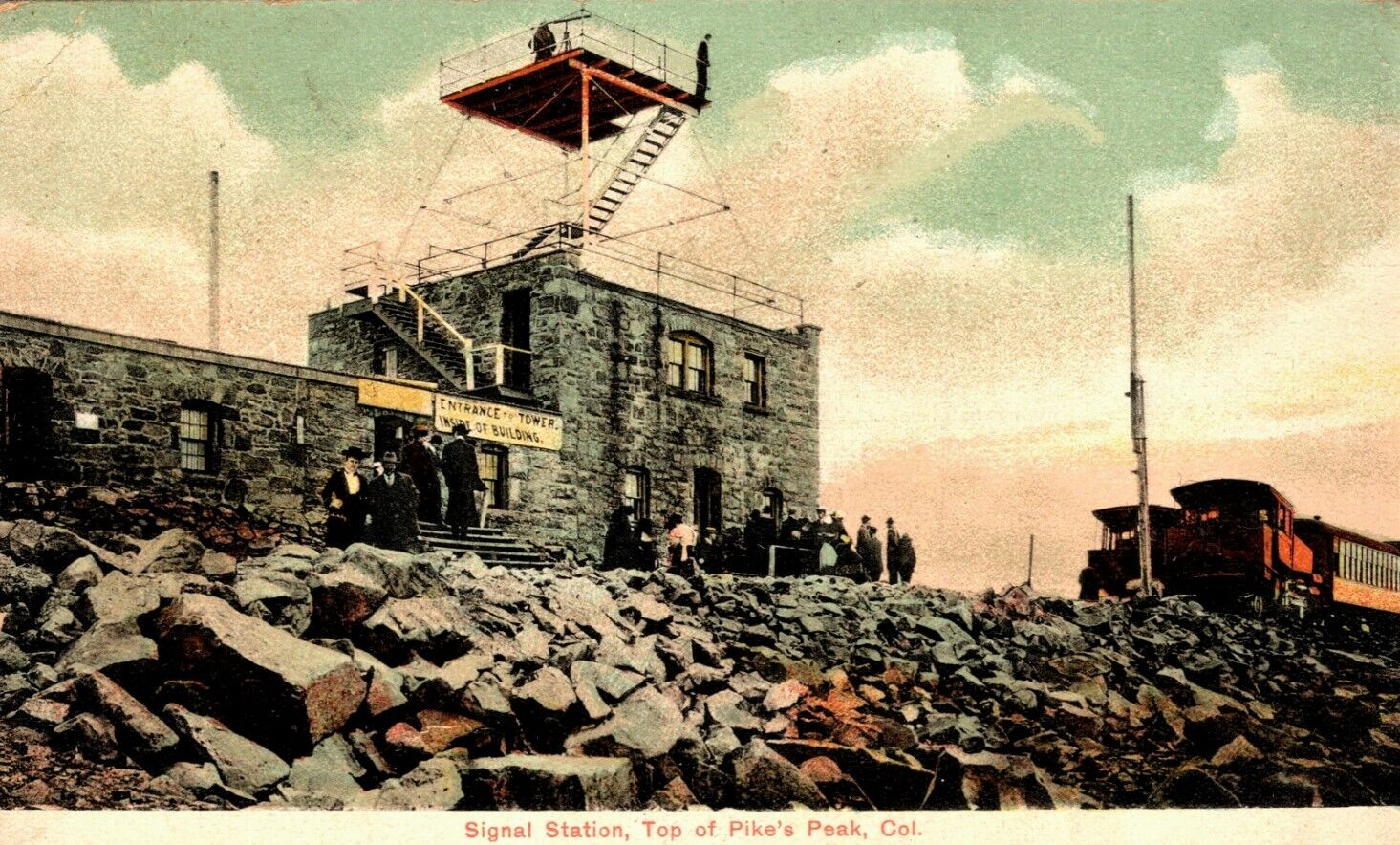
U.S. Signal Station

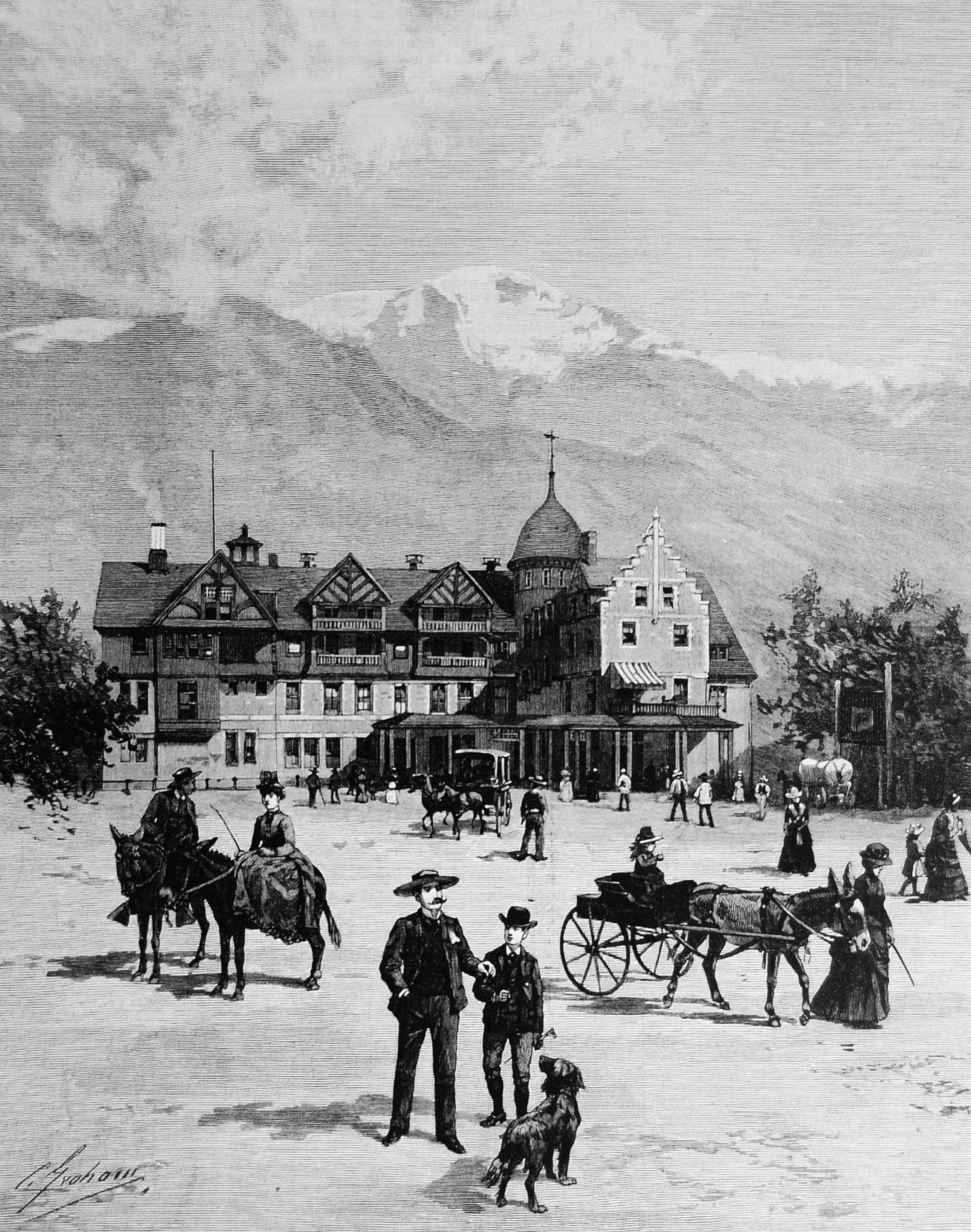
The Antlers

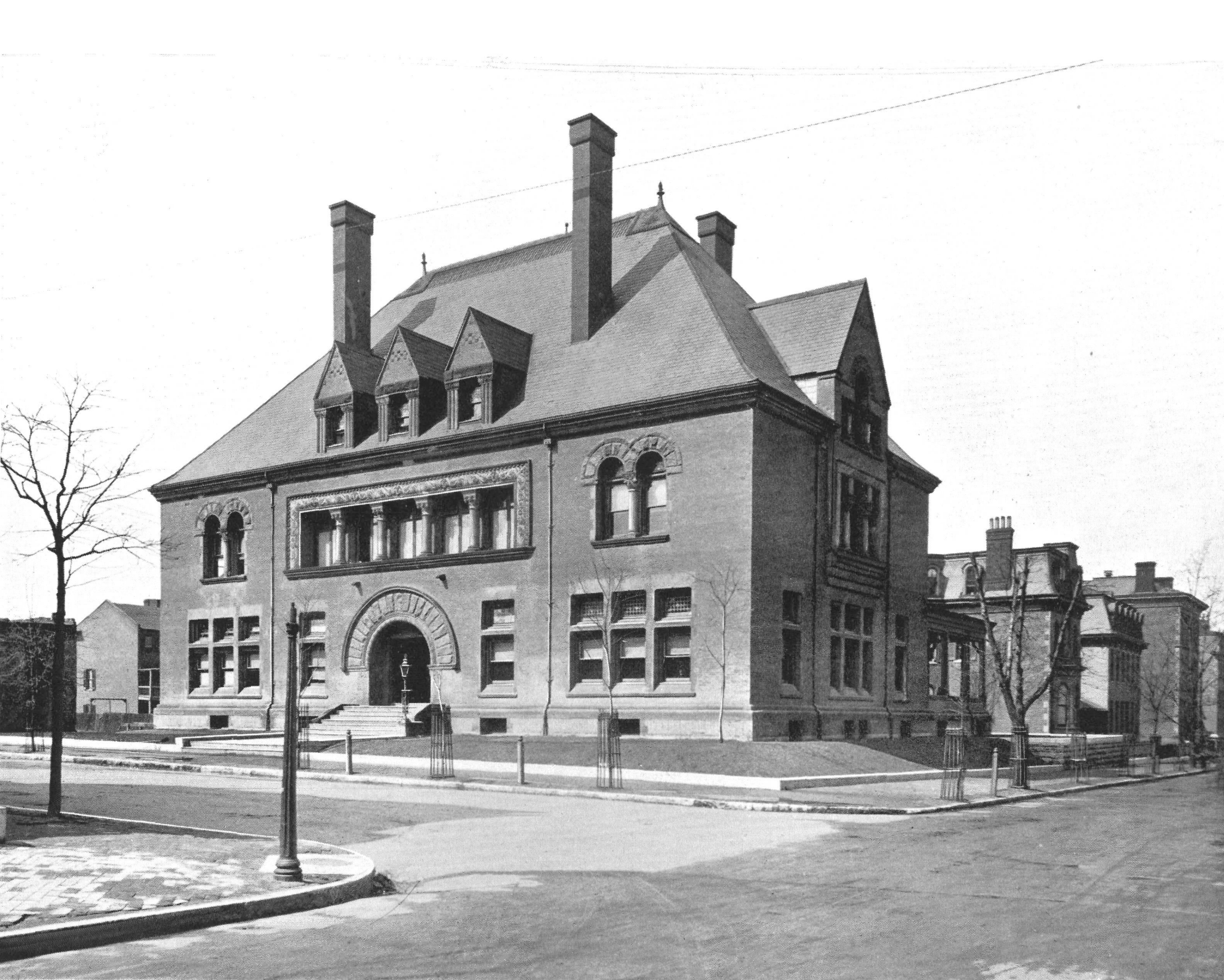
St. Louis Club House

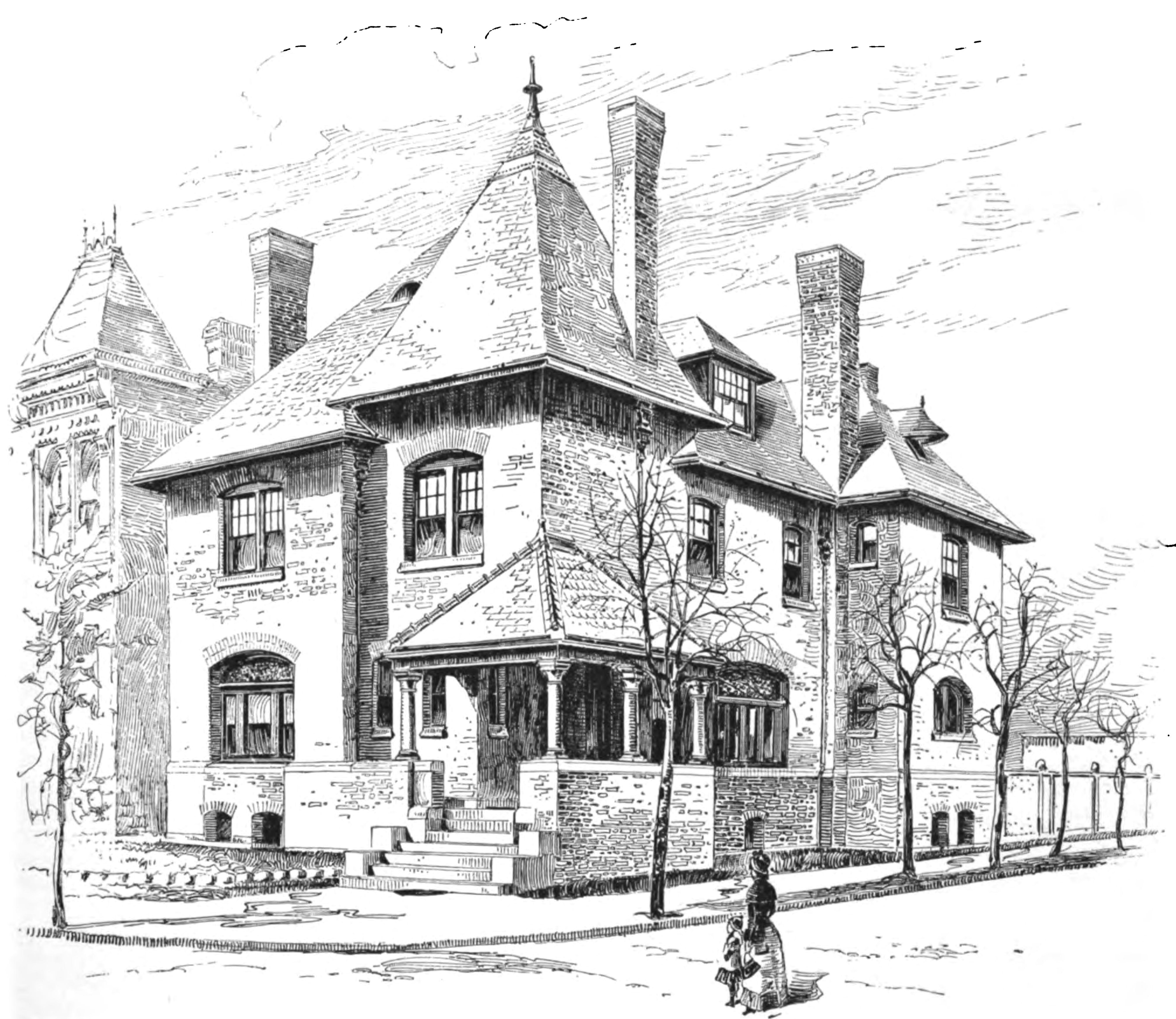
Dr. George Ashe Bronson House

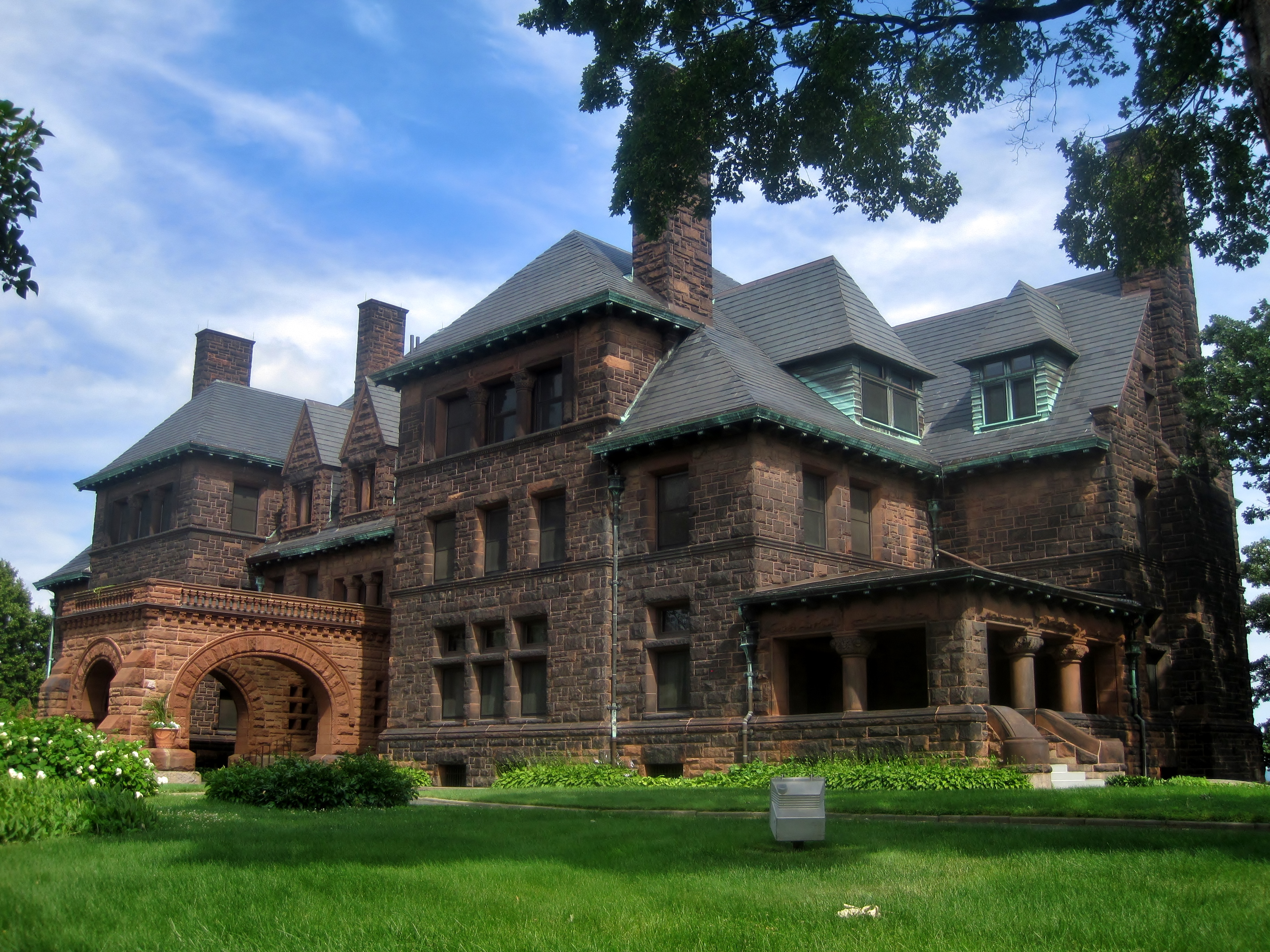
James J. Hill House

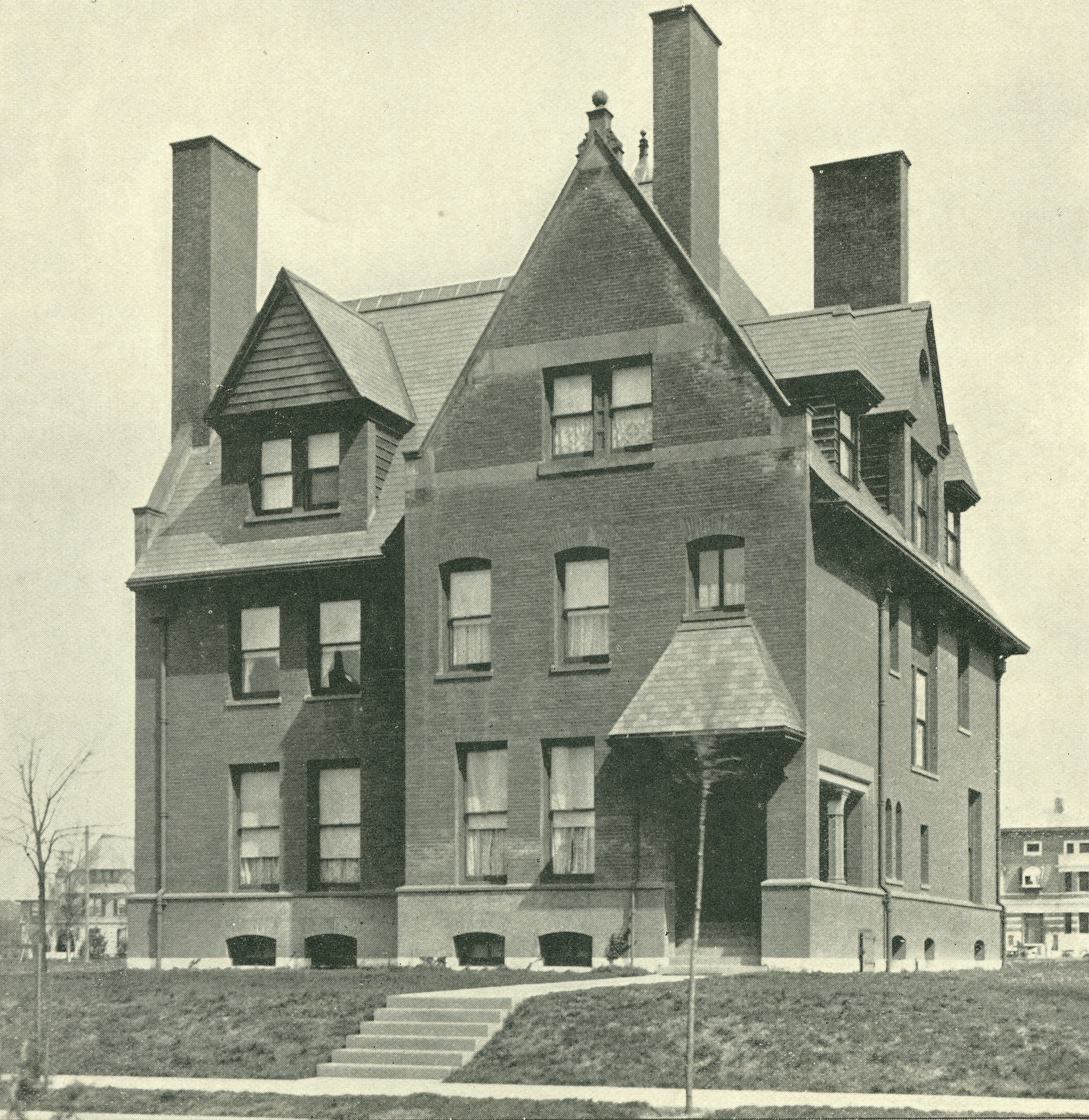
21 Westmoreland Place

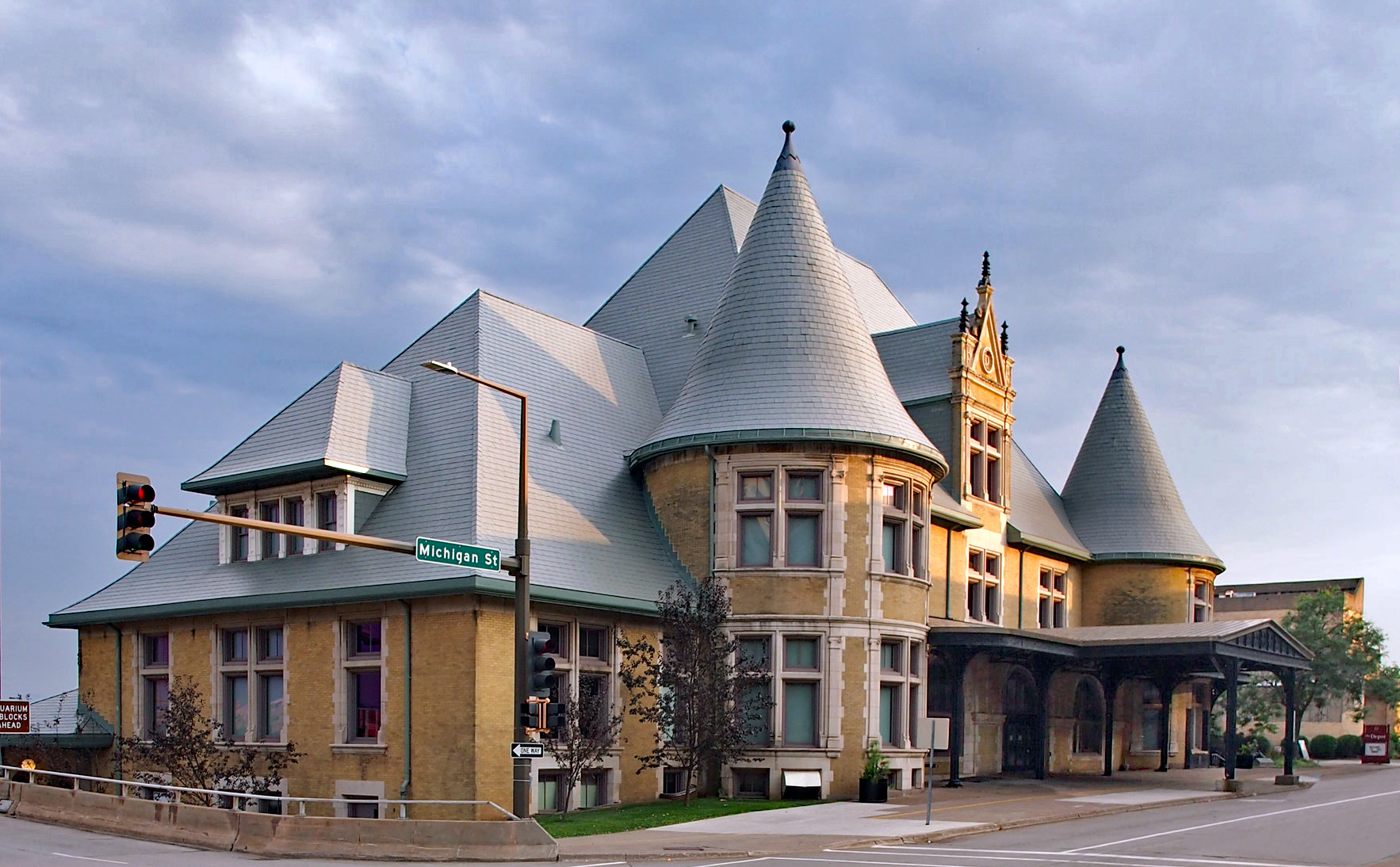
Duluth Union Depot

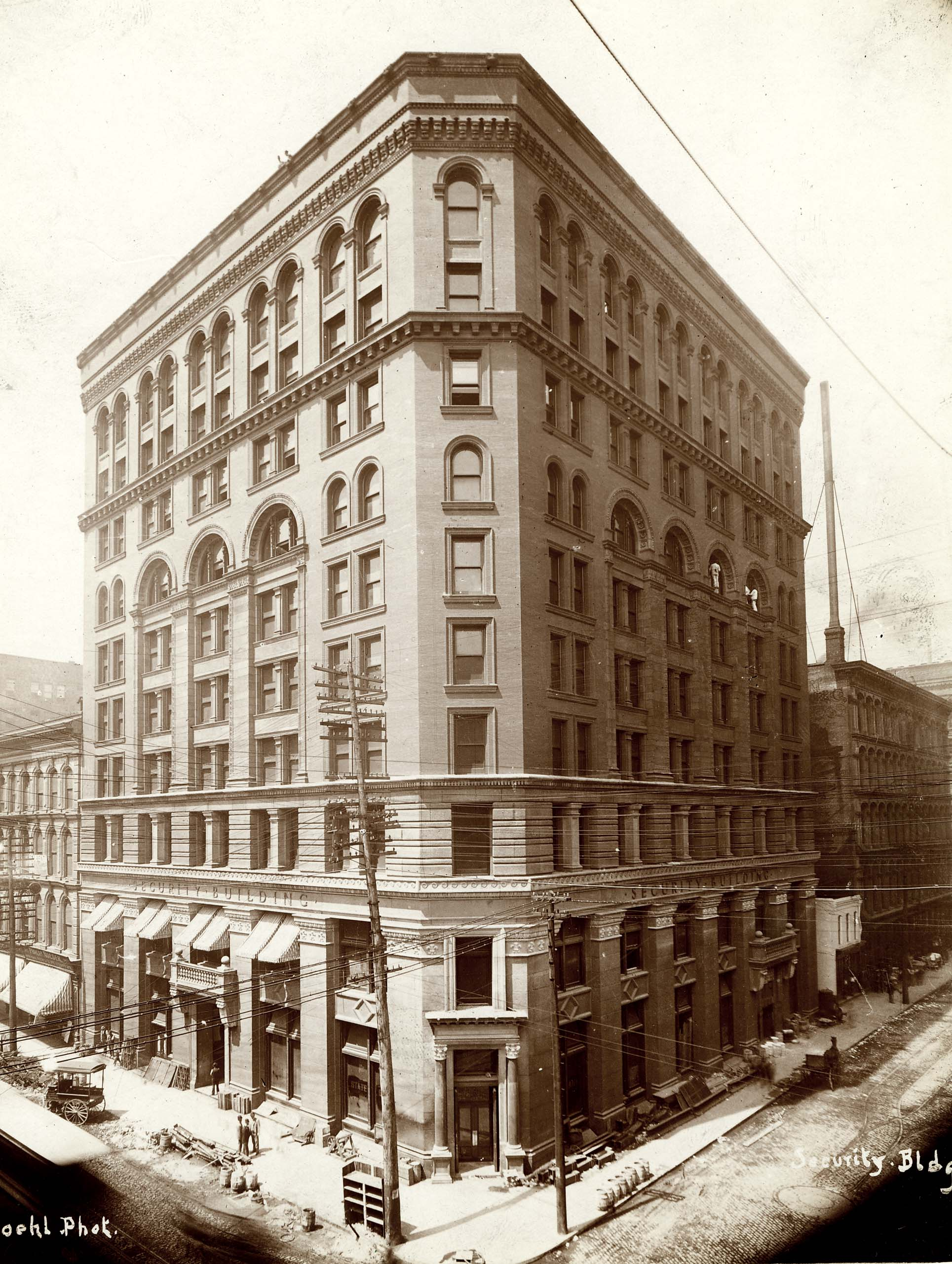
Security Building

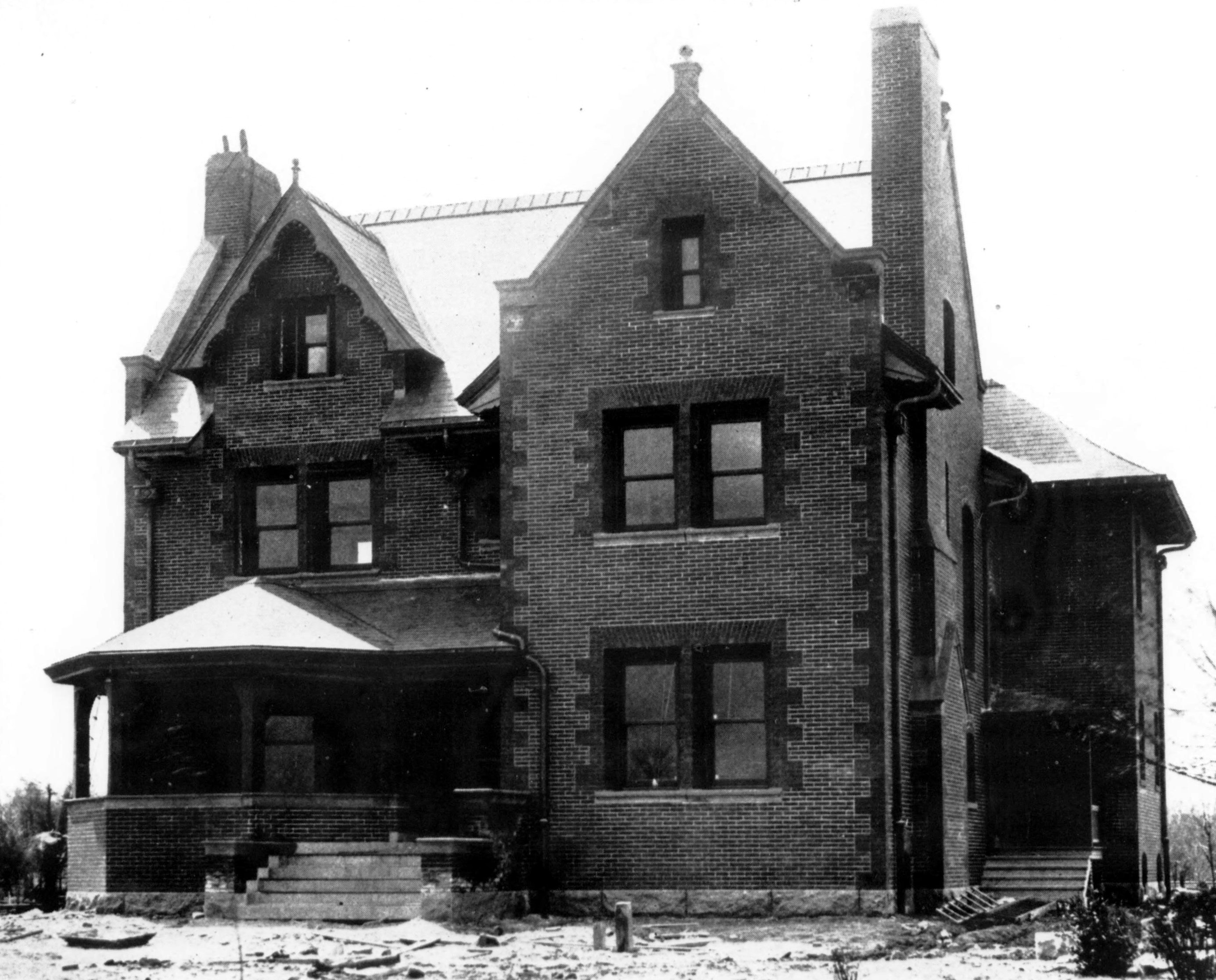
Corinne Dyer House

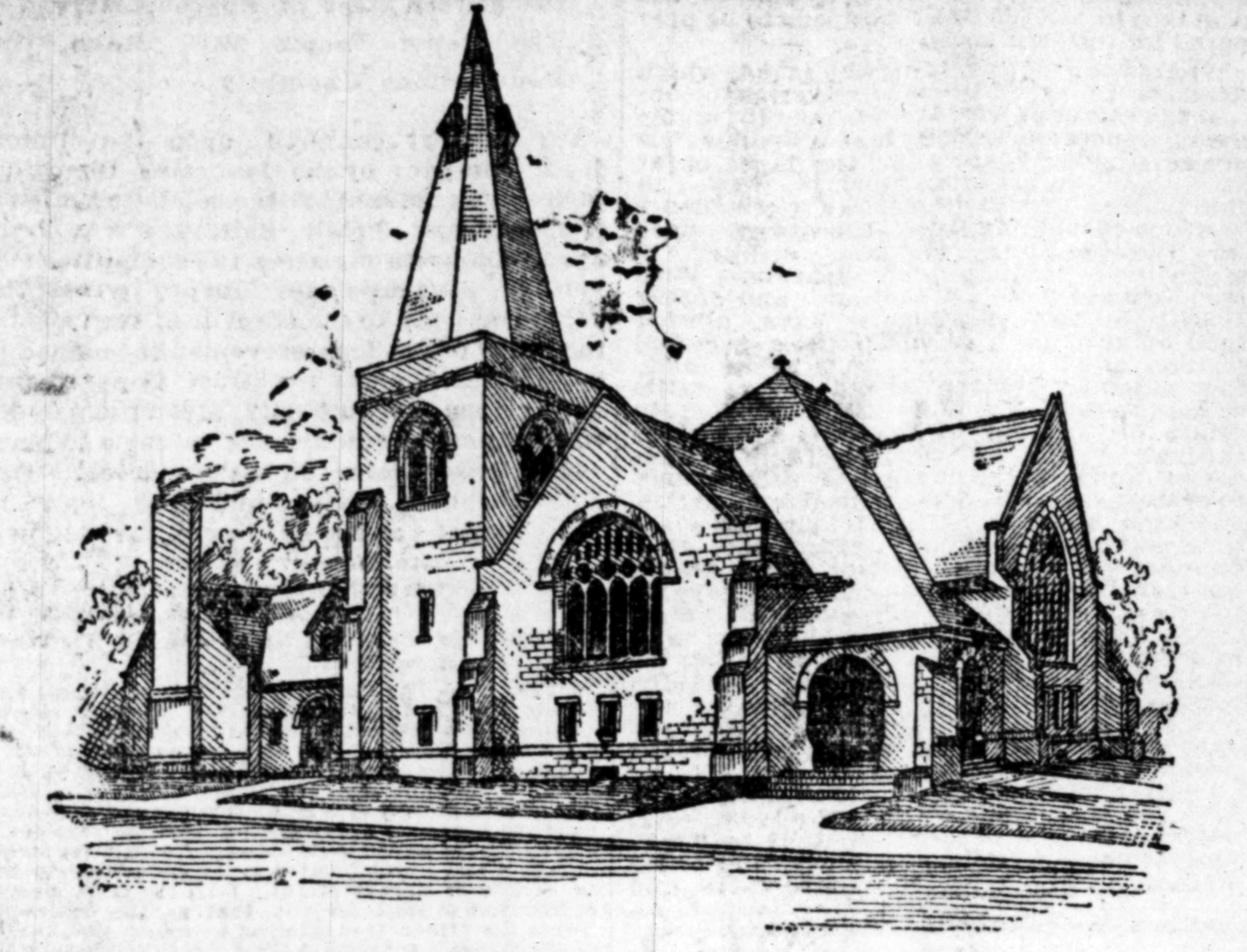
Lindell Methodist Episcopal Church

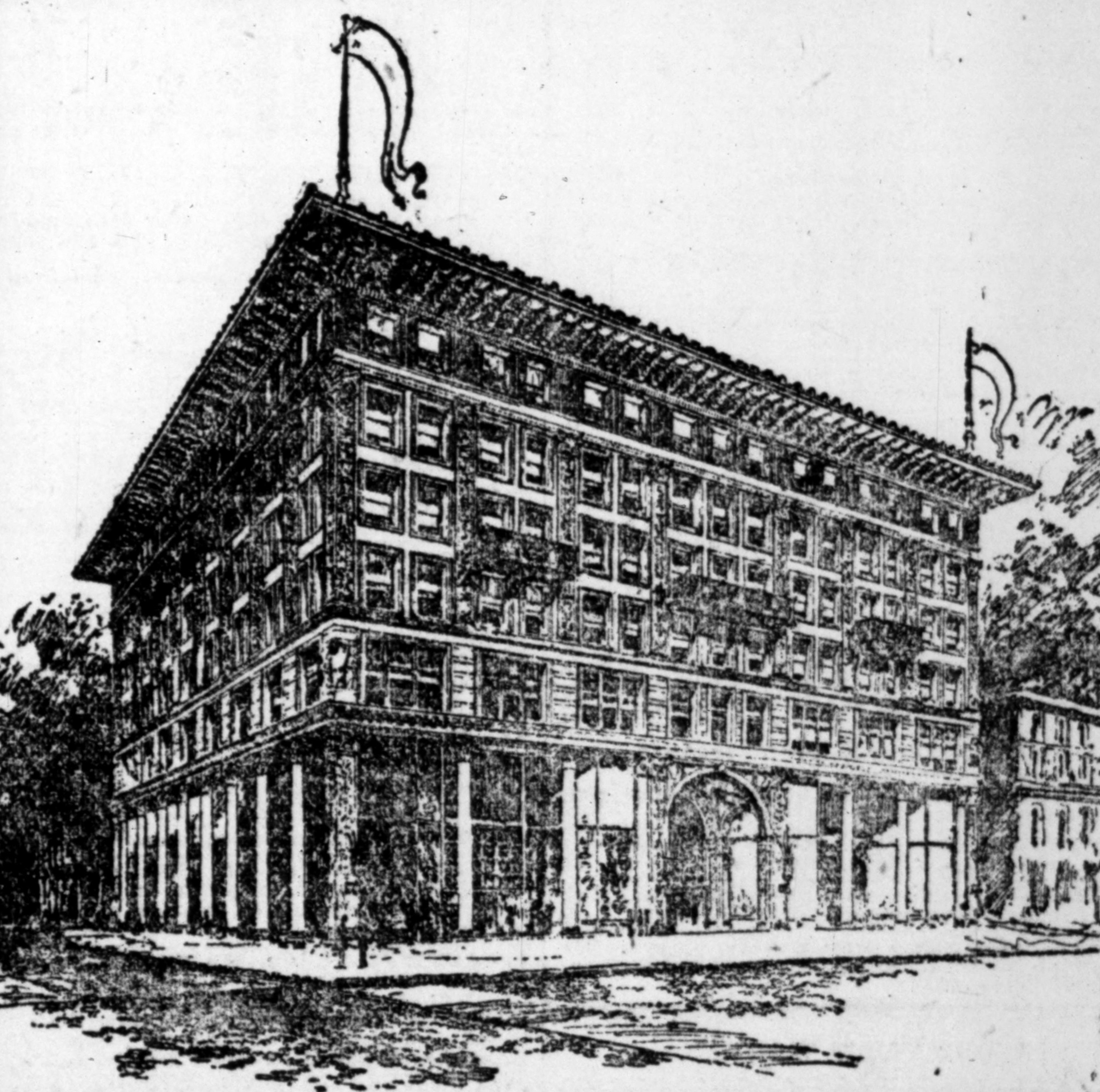
The Collier Building

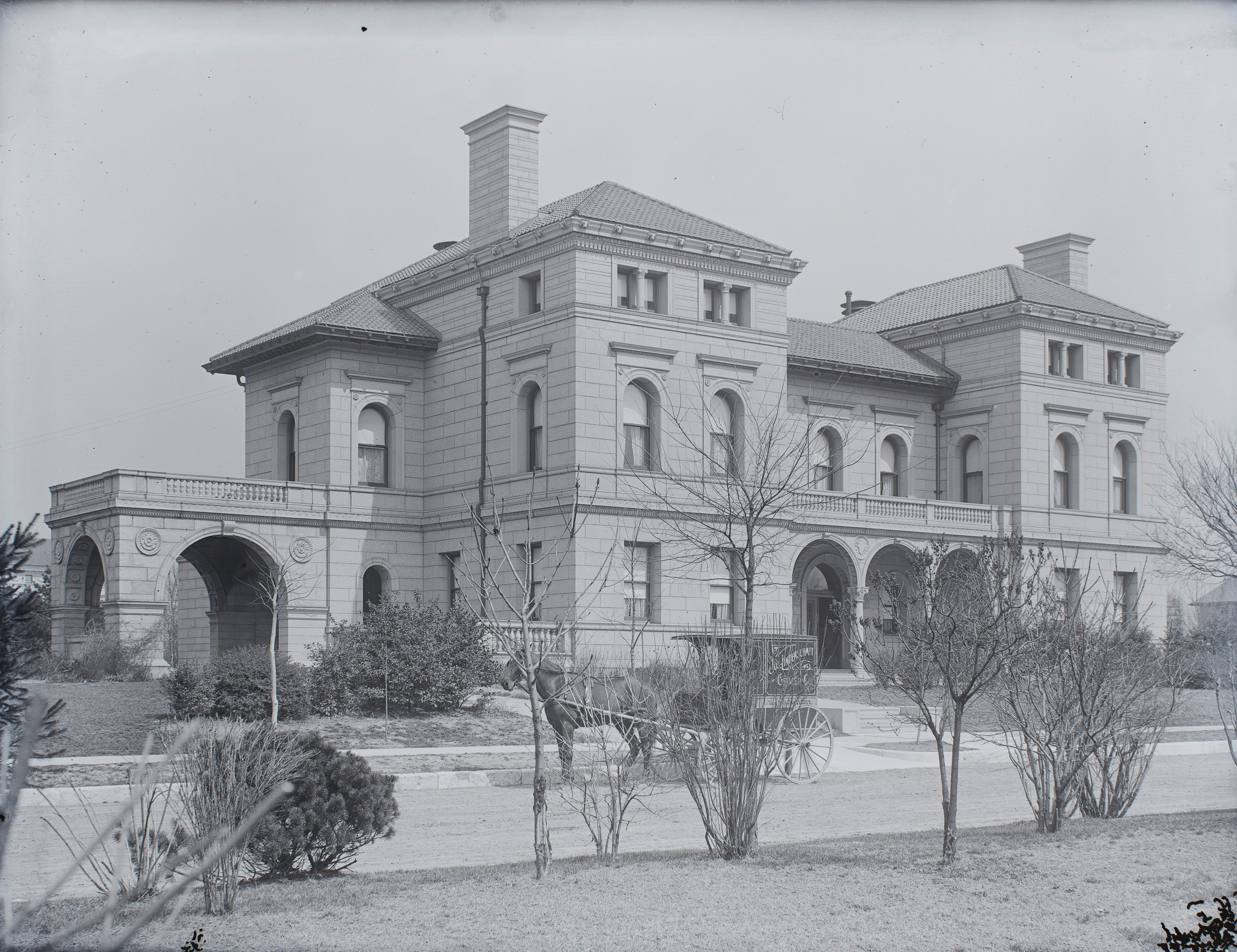
John T. Davis House

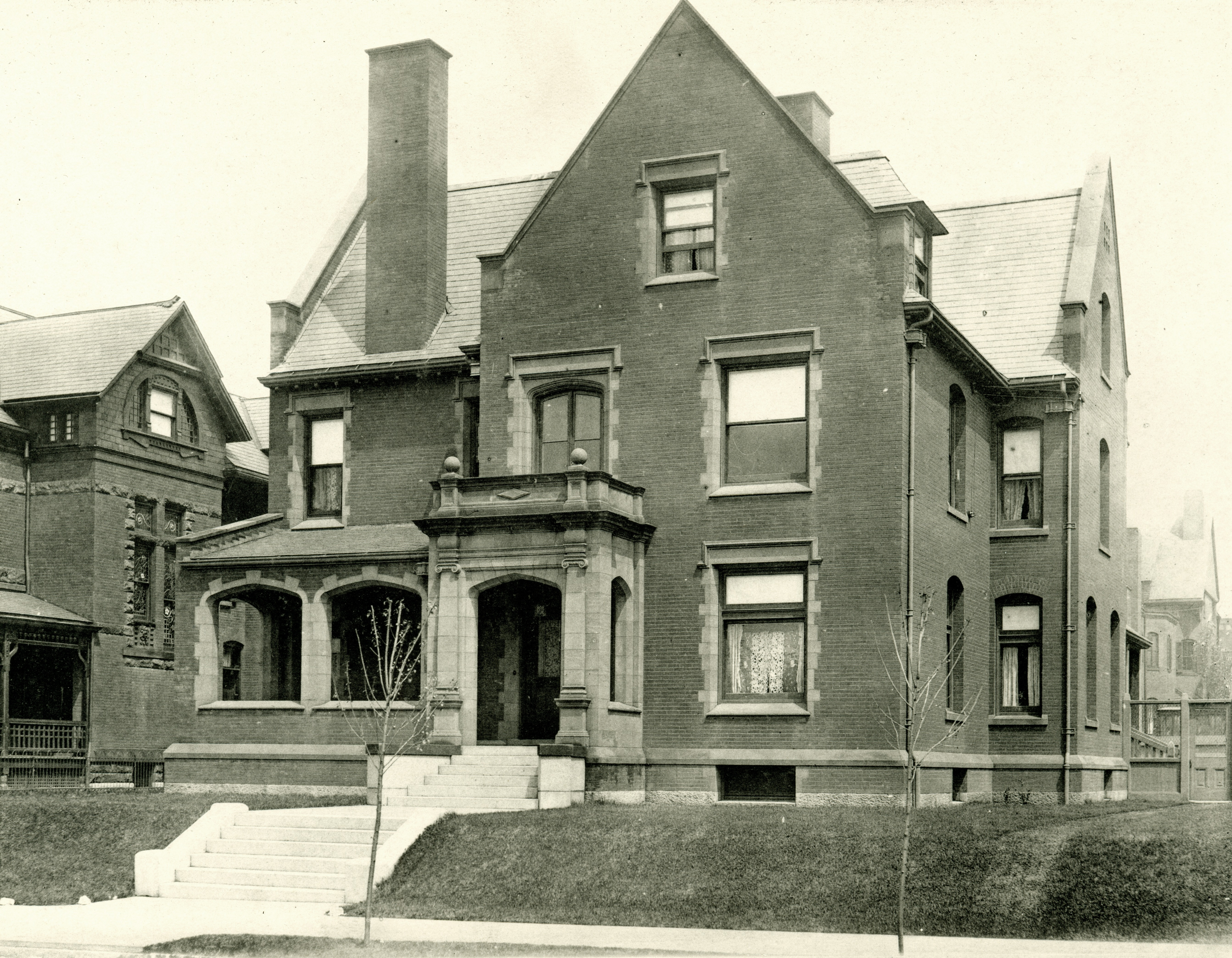
D. R. Wolfe House

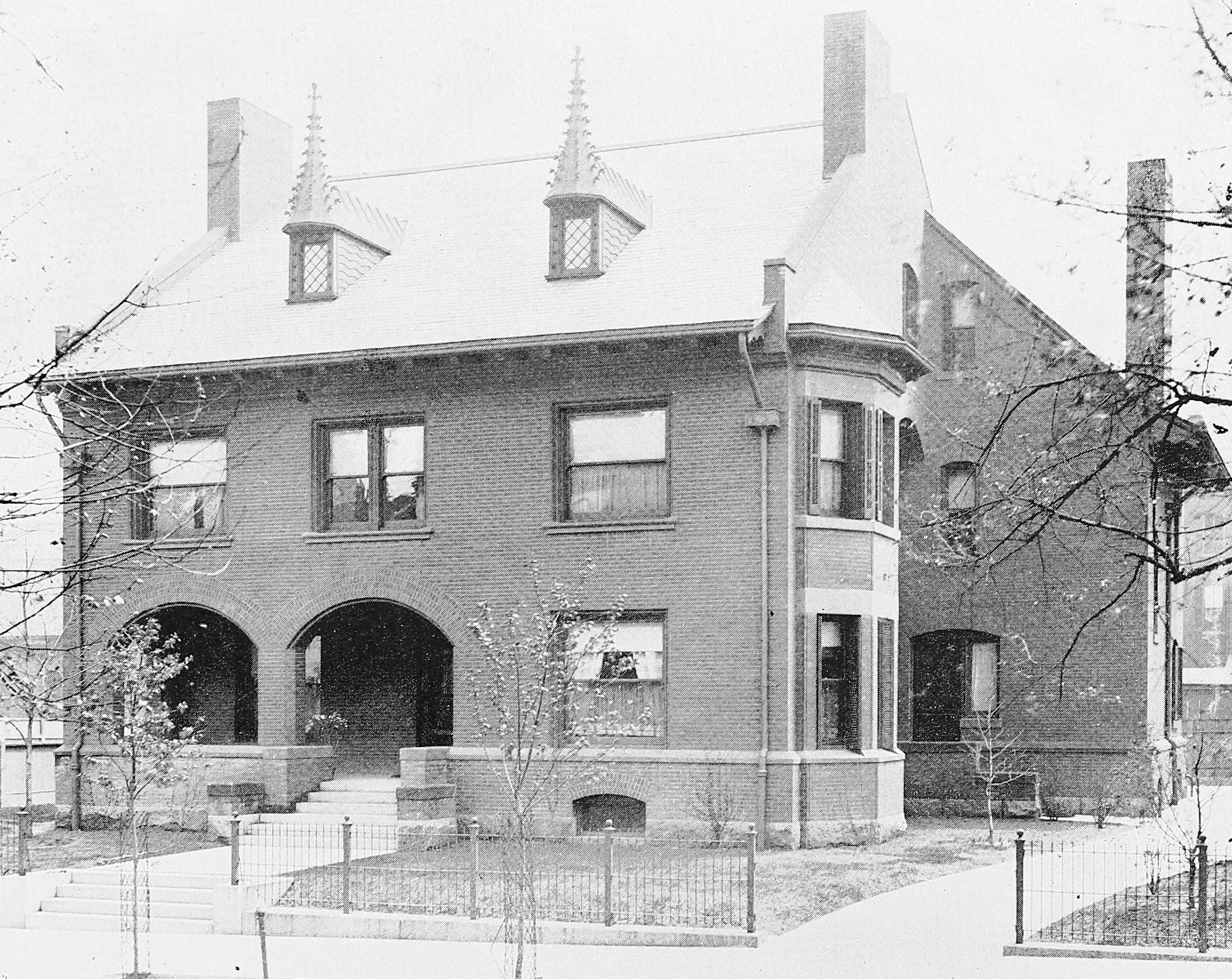
George M. Maverick House
