= The Antlers (University of Missouri) =

Unofficial student group supporting University of Missouri basketball

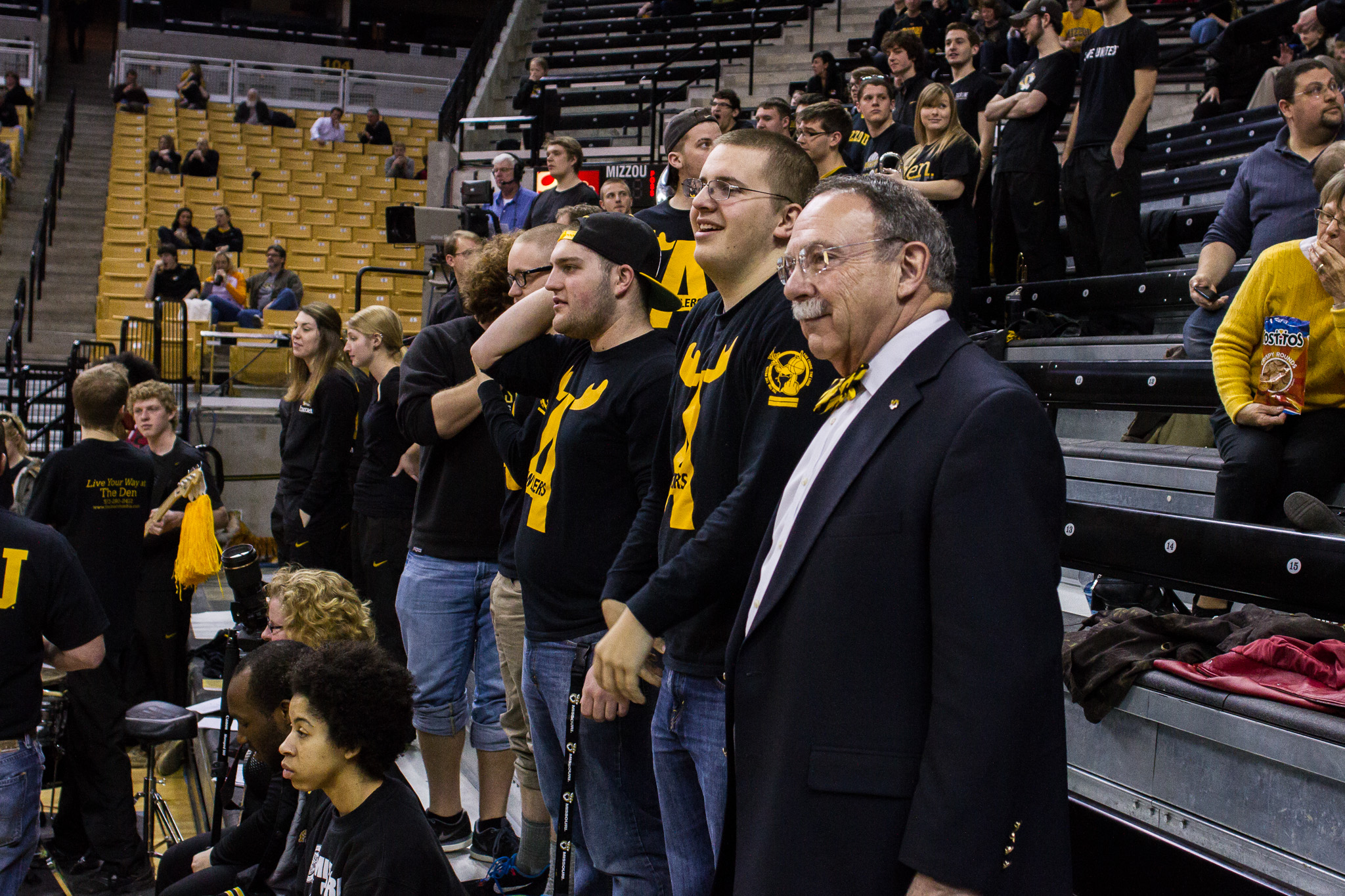
Former Chancellor R. Bowen Loftin looks on as The Antlers cheer on a women's basketball game.

The Antlers is an unofficial student group that supports the Missouri Tigers men's basketball and Missouri Tigers women's basketball teams.

== History ==
The Antlers were formed in 1976 when a small section of 11 courtside seats in the school's basketball arena at that time, Hearnes Center, was made available to all students. At the time, all other prime level seating was reserved for alumni and major financial contributors. A lottery was held for the seats and the winners, including Antler co-founders Jeff Gordon (now a sportswriter for the St. Louis Post-Dispatch) and Rob “The Hammer” Banning, decided to go all-out with their cheering style to celebrate the new seating arrangement. During their second season in the new seats, someone observing their cheering style dubbed them the Antlers, and the name stuck. The group soon grew from 5 to 22 members when it was expanded to fill all of the seats in A-16.

Wild costume and constant taunting of opponents gained media exposure for the Antlers. As they became more organized and their pranks became more colorful, they gained national exposure from articles about them in Sports Illustrated and The Sporting News. In the mid-1980s, USA Today even named The Antlers as one of the top five fan groups in the nation.

In 1995 the Antlers seats were moved from the front of A16 to the back of the same section.

=== The Antler Dance ===
The name Antlers, having nothing to do with the University of Missouri, stems from a dance being performed by the Antlers during a basketball game. The dance closely resembled one from a skit from the 9/18/76 Lily Tomlin Saturday Night Live episode that had recently aired. In the skit, Tomlin danced with her hands at the side of her head, fingers outstretched like she had antlers. Antler founders Gordon and Banning watched the skit in the third floor lounge of Hudson Hall and took the idea to one of their first games as an official group. During the "Missouri Waltz," members of the new group performed their new dance with their hands at their head like antlers. A member of press row noticed them doing the dance and dubbed them the Antlers. The Antlers continue to do the Antler dance to this day.

== Notable antics ==
Prior to a Missouri-Kansas basketball game in 2003, members of the Antlers prank called KU coach Roy Williams at his home at 2:27, 2:45, and 3:05 a.m. In the week prior the MU-KU game, they obtained the numbers of KU players and coaches and prank called them for a full week. They also made signs with the players' names and phone numbers.

On March 9, 2003, KU played MU in Columbia. Members from the Antlers greeted the KU players at the hotel, holding up signs that read "Plane Crash." These signs were also evident during a nationally televised game. The "Plane Crash" signs were in reference to Nick Collison's senior day speech, where he talked about his grandfather who was a World War II veteran. According to Collison, his grandfather's plane crashed during D-Day, but he survived.
