= Antlers Hotel (Raquette Lake, New York) =

Hotel in New York, United States

Coordinates: 43°49′31″N 74°38′51″W

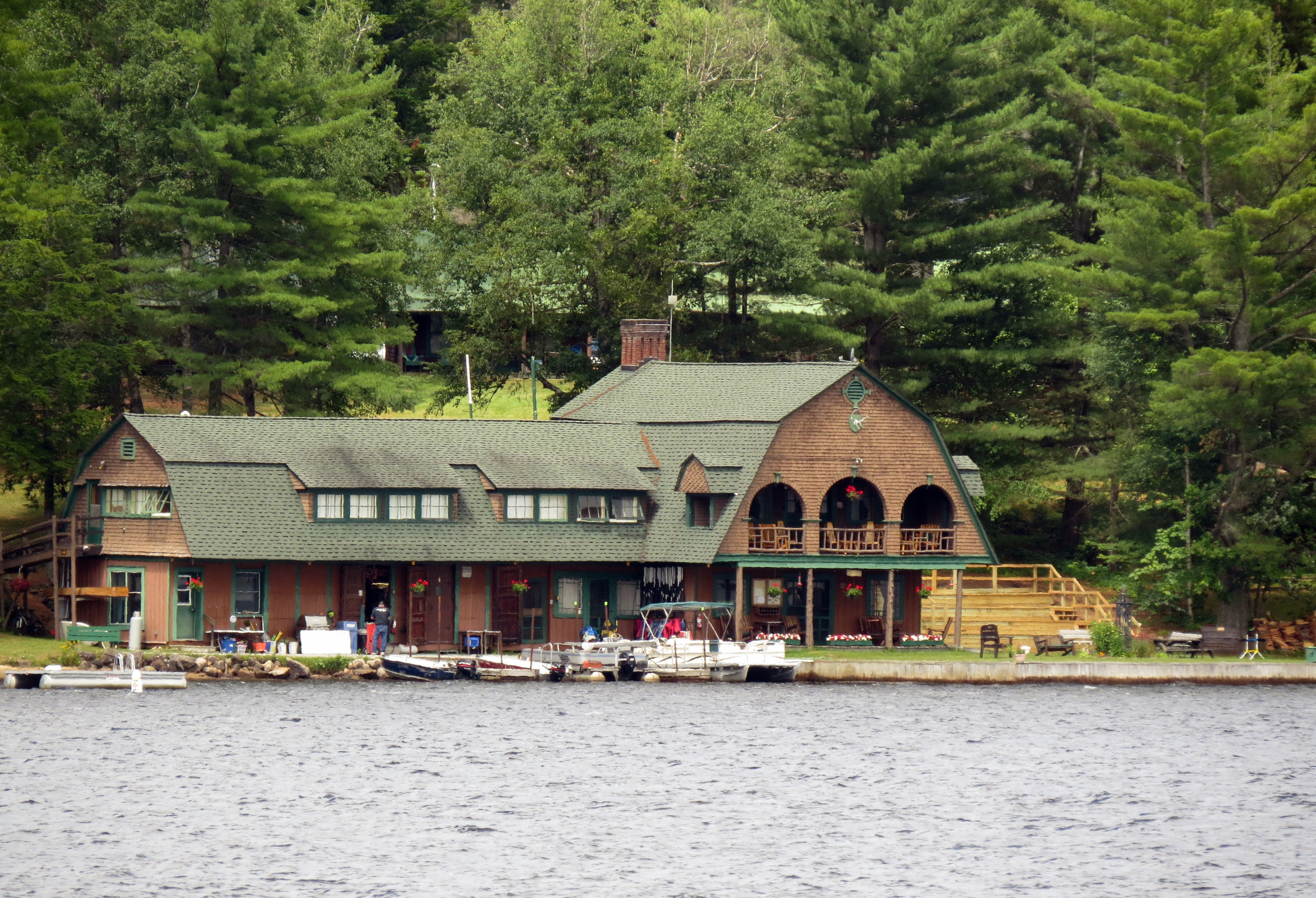
The boat house of the Antlers Hotel on Raquette Lake, presently used as an outdoor and environmental education center by SUNY Cortland

The Antlers Hotel on Raquette Lake in the town of Raquette Lake, New York is an historic hotel that was built in the late 1880s. It is presently operated as an outdoor and environmental education center by SUNY Cortland; it is mainly active during the summer months, and has a dining hall as well as housing accommodations for 45 people.

Originally called Constable Point, it was built and renamed by Charles Bennett and operated as a hotel that accommodated 200 guests from 1887 until his death in 1915. His sister, Margaret Bennett, sold the hotel to the Cedar Island Corporation in 1920, and they used the property as a summer school for 150 students; accommodations for the students' families were also provided. At points in its history, it also had an active post office, a nine-hole golf course, tennis courts, and a casino. It was later used as a summer camp. In 1957, the property was subdivided and a portion was operated as the Antlers Motel until 1965 when it was sold to the State University Teachers College at Cortland; the college used it as a camp for family of Alumni.
