= Dr. George Ashe Bronson House =

Historic house in Missouri, United States

- U.S. National Register of Historic Places
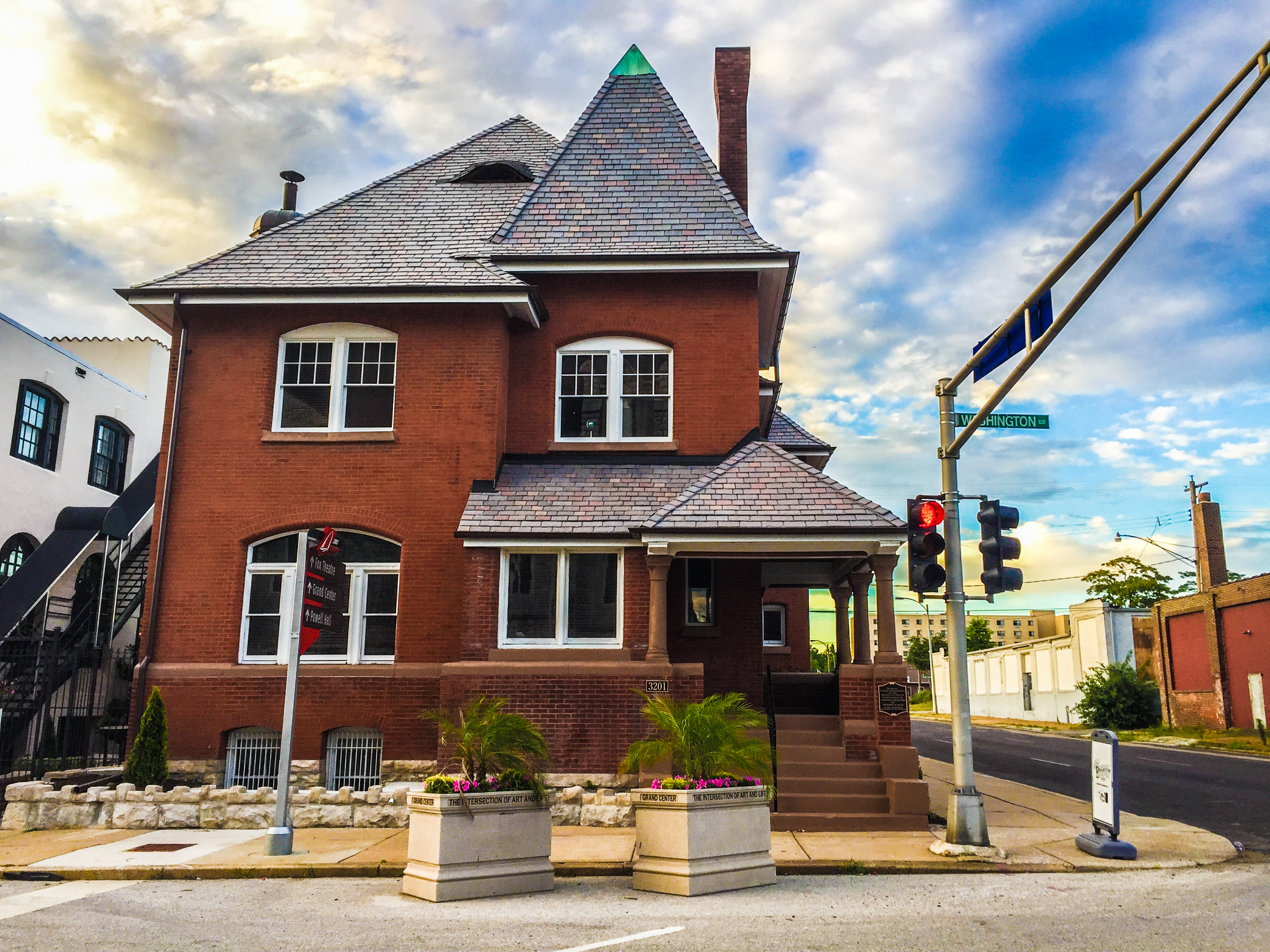
- Location: 3201 Washington Ave., St. Louis, Missouri
- Coordinates: 38.637630°N 90.225036°W
- Built: 1885
- Architect: Peabody & Stearns and Pierce P. Furber
- Architectural style: Late Victorian
- NRHP reference No.: 15000305
- Added to NRHP: June 2, 2015

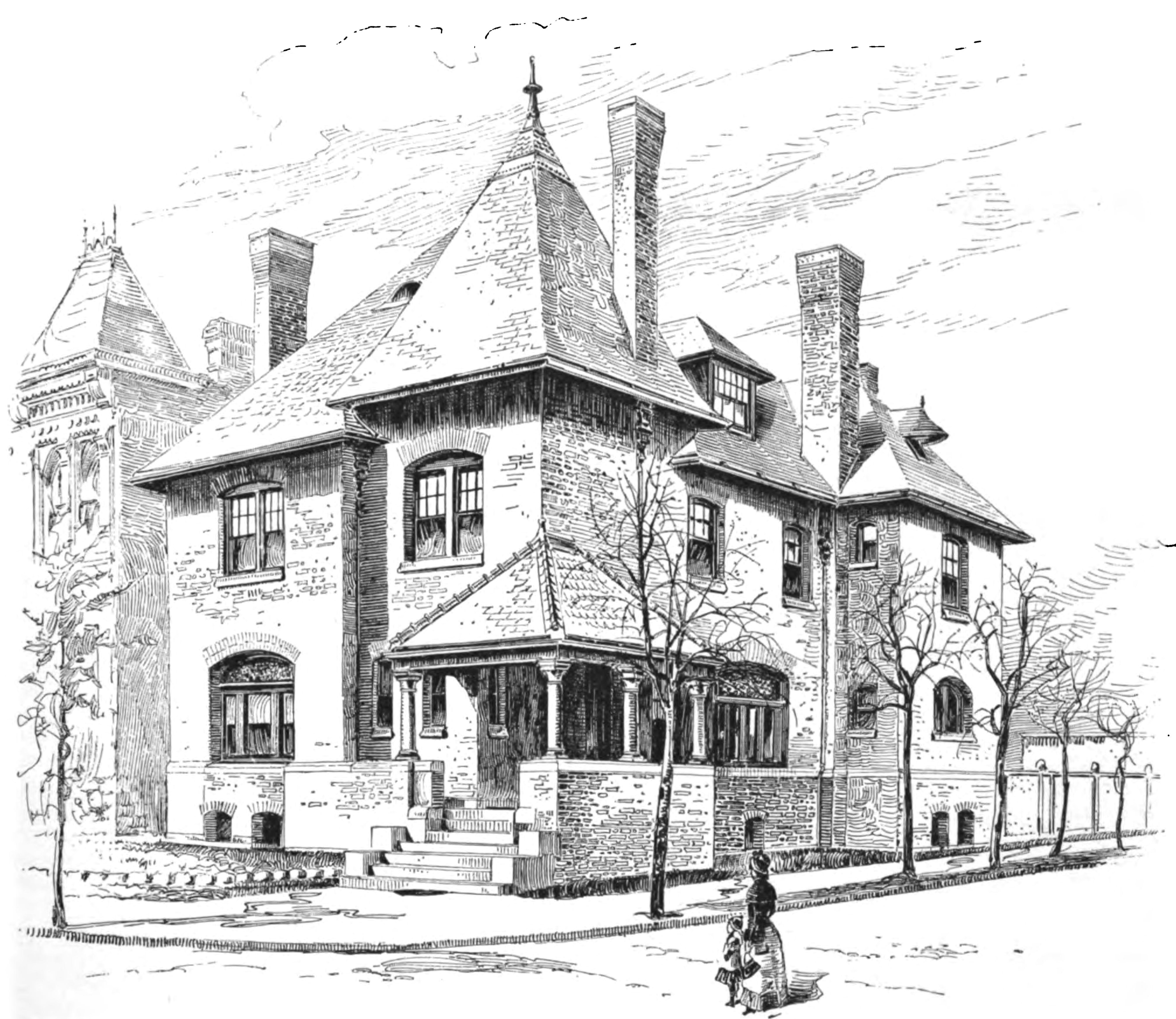
Dr. Bronson's house in 1886

The Dr. George Ashe Bronson House is a 136-year-old historic house on Washington Ave in St. Louis, Missouri. It was built in 1885 for prominent local dentist Dr. George Ashe Bronson as both an office and a residence for him and his widowed mother. Bronson lived in the house until his death in 1932. The home was listed on the National Register of Historic Places in 2015.

== Description ==
The house is a brick home in the style of the Late Victorian era with design elements from other styles popular at the time of its construction. It stands at two-and-one-half stories tall and sits at the corner of Washington Avenue and Compton Avenue. The first floor contains seven primary rooms.

== History ==
The home was built by the Boston architectural firm Peabody & Stearns and St. Louis developers Pierce P. Furber in 1885, after the death of Dr. Bronson, the home was transferred to a trust until its purchase by a developer in 2014.

== George Ashe Bronson ==
Bronson was a prominent local dentist. He practiced dentistry from the home and had two patents related to dentistry.

Bronson was an avid gardener and in 1908 created a Japanese garden on the premises of the home dubbed "The Oasis". The design of the gardens came from Shiro Miyake, a dental student at nearby Washington University. Miyake came to America with the Japanese exhibit to the 1904 World's Fair and for a time was Dr. Bronson's houseman. The gardens were used by patients as a distraction from painful dental procedures.

He never married and at the age of 70 Bronson died suddenly of a heart attack in October 1932.

== Renovation ==
In 2014 the building was purchased by Acree-Kelley LLC. In 2016 the building was renovated for use as commercial offices by Hicor Group. In 2017 the renovation work won the "Most Enhanced Award" from the Landmarks Association of St. Louis.
