= Hearnes Center =

Multi-purpose arena in Missouri

Coordinates: 38.93434°N 92.33060°W

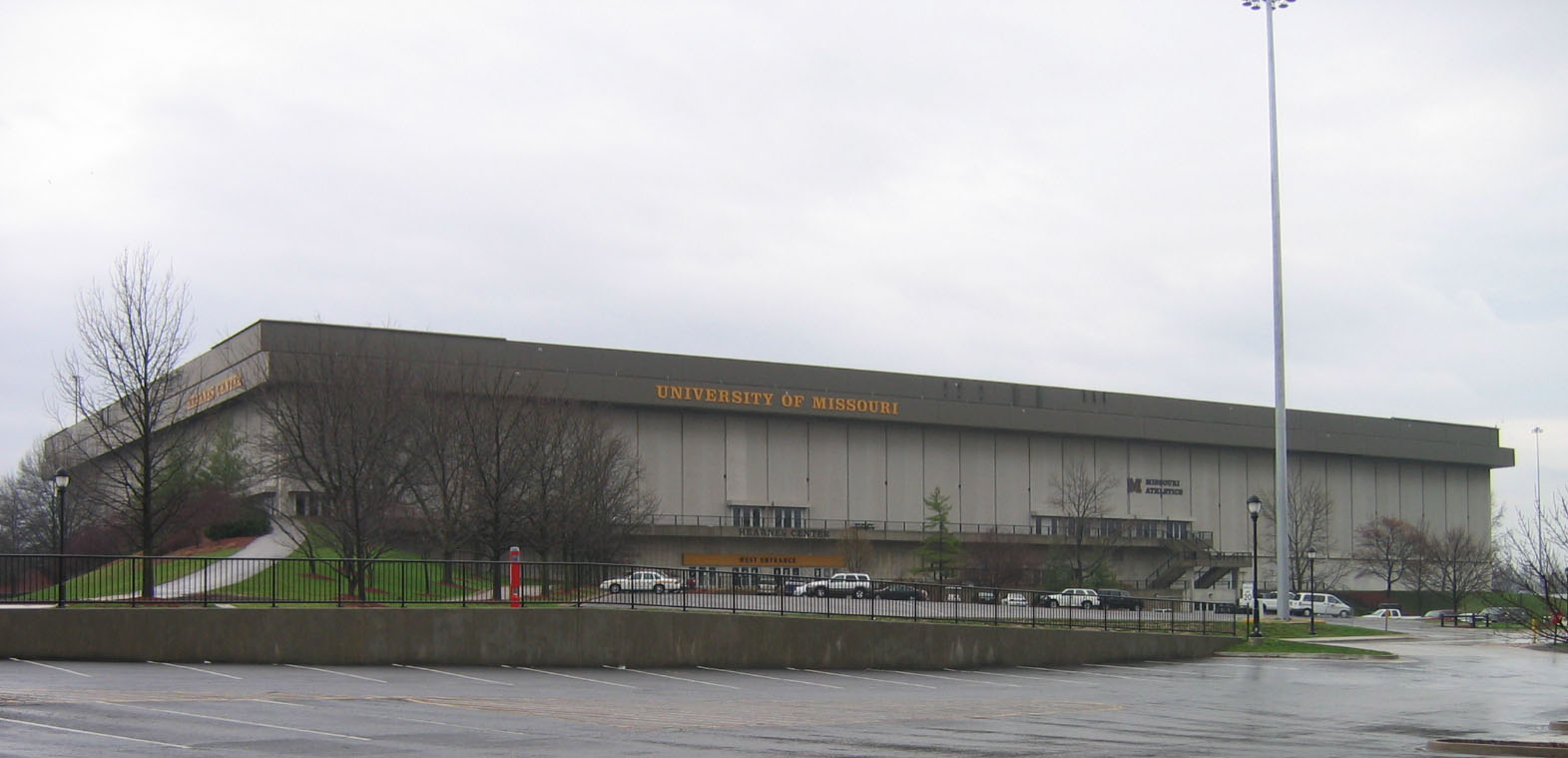
- Interactive map of Hearnes Center
- Location: 600 E Stadium Blvd; Columbia, MO 65211
- Owner: University of Missouri
- Operator: University of Missouri
- Capacity: 13,611 (1972–present)

Construction
- Groundbreaking: 1969
- Opened: August 4, 1972
- Cost: $10.75 million
- Architect: Sverdrup & Parcel

Tenants
- Missouri Tigers (NCAA); Men's basketball (1972–2004); Wrestling (1972–present); Track and field (fieldhouse annex) (1973–present); Women's basketball (1974–2004); Women's volleyball (1975–present); Women's gymnastics (1979–present)

Hearnes Center is a 13,611-seat multi-purpose arena in Columbia, Missouri. The arena opened in 1972. It is currently home to the Missouri Tigers' wrestling, women's volleyball, and indoor track and field teams. It was home to the University of Missouri Tigers men's and women's basketball teams before Mizzou Arena opened in 2004. It was the host of University of Missouri gymnastics until their move to Mizzou Arena in 2025. It is also the host of Missouri's State FFA Convention, but there are plans to move that event to Mizzou Arena in the coming years.

Groundbreaking for the Hearnes Center occurred in 1969, and the arena was officially dedicated on August 4, 1972. The arena got its name from former Missouri governor and 1952 Mizzou graduate Warren Hearnes. The cost of the building project was $10.75 million. Prior to the opening of the Hearnes Center, the Missouri basketball team played its home games at Brewer Fieldhouse, which was built in 1929 and has since been remodeled into a modern recreation center.

Hearnes quickly became one of college basketball's toughest places to play during the 1980s, when players such as Steve Stipanovich, Jon Sundvold, Derrick Chievous and Doug Smith suited up for Norm Stewart. Several factors contributed to this reputation: the steep banking of the seating area, its flat roof and angling of its upper sections, and The Antlers, whose presence in Section A-16 made them the bane of many an opposition. Decibel meters were added to the corners of the arena in the early 1990s in addition to new scoreboards, and it was not uncommon to see them go well above 110 dB during conference games, and regularly cresting 125 dB against Kansas or during 2001's famed "Fire Code Game" against Iowa, where well over 14,500 people packed the building to see then-#2 Mizzou be stunned by Steve Alford's club.

In its later life, the building saw several changes: a new floor was installed in 1998, rear-projection video monitors replaced the matrix boards at the turn of the new millennium, and the student seating plan was also altered. Before Quin Snyder came to coach the Tigers, student seating was scattered throughout the arena and distributed via who picked up tickets first, and while the largest amount sat along one sideline (including the band, Student Athletic Board and the aforementioned Antlers), others sat as high as the D sections, which early in the arena's life doubled as lecture halls (to this day, their seats have fold-out writing desks). Attempting to create an atmosphere similar to his former employers, Duke, Snyder mandated that all students be moved to one end of the court, where bleachers would replace the old seats and primacy would be given to his new "Zou Crew" club, with all other seating areas becoming put up for general sale. The move was criticized for changing the atmosphere at Missouri games to something less distinctive while enabling more seats to be sold at a higher cost, but was duplicated (with more restrictions on student seating) at Mizzou Arena. The final regulation home game at Hearnes came in 2004, where a David Padgett buzzer-beater meant Kansas would send the building out on a Tiger loss. The Tigers would return to Hearnes for an exhibition game in 2013 against Oklahoma City University. More than 12,000 fans including many Tiger basketball greats attended the game, with the team donning Stewart-era "Big M" uniforms for the occasion.

Following the construction of Mizzou Arena, the building was taken over fully by indoor Olympic sports. Volleyball took over the main basketball dressing room and the old practice courts were converted into a state-of-the-art wrestling room. In the late 2000s, the university installed large banners that cover up much of C and D sections and display the honors of the volleyball, wrestling, and gymnastics teams. In 2018, a water main broke and flooded the event level: this forced volleyball to play that year's home schedule at Mizzou Arena but also enabled Hearnes to be renovated. The centerpiece of this renovation was a new Daktronics HD video cube and scoring system as well as new retractable seating on the event level.

The Hearnes Center also contains a field house that is home to the indoor track and field team, as well as one of the country's largest blood drives. Each fall, students donate blood as part of the school's Homecoming week festivities. In 2005, students and Columbia residents donated over 5,000 units of blood.

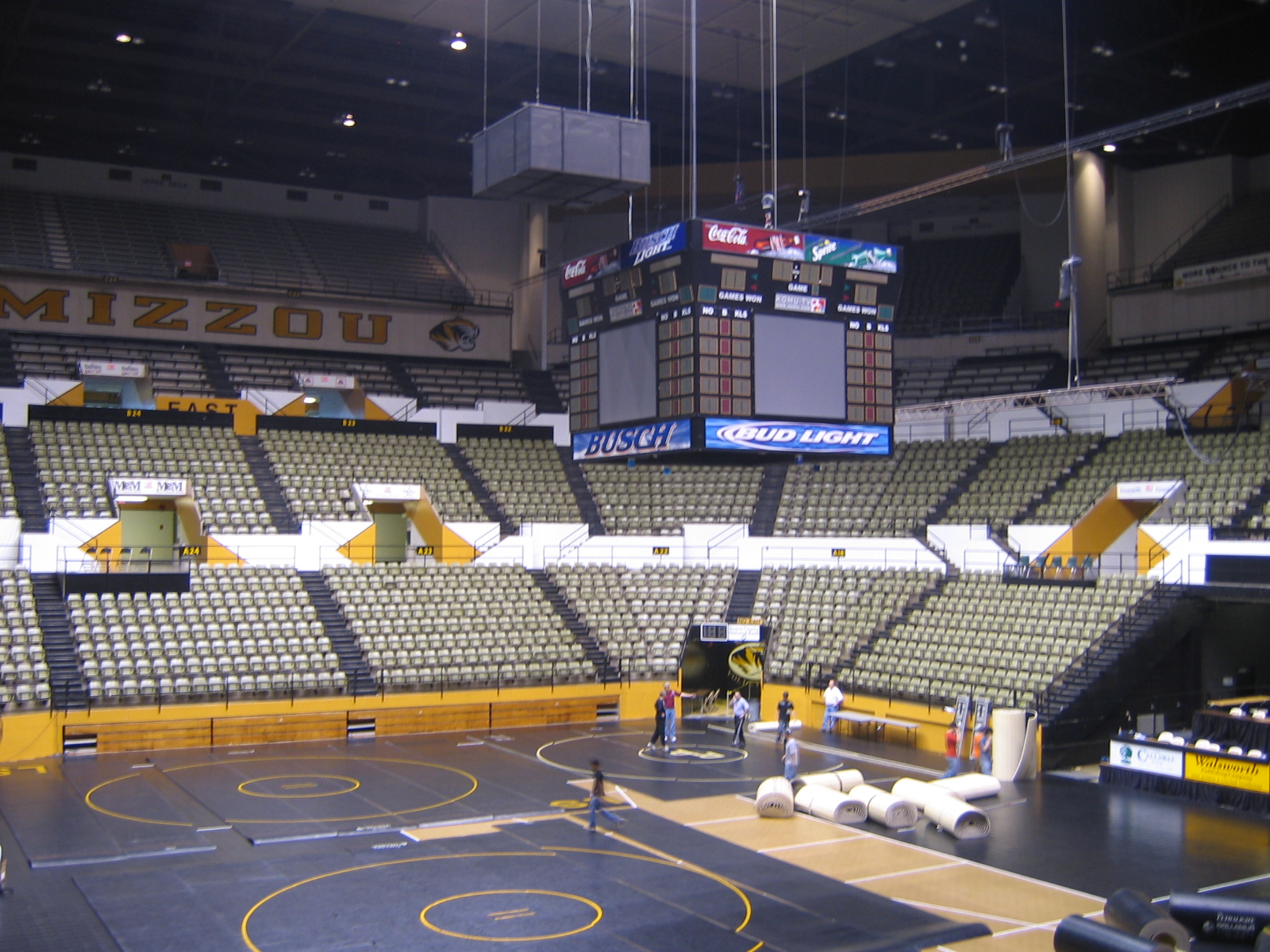

During the school year, the parking lot adjacent to the main building serves as student parking for many on- and off-campus residents.
