= Raquette Lake Camps =

Summer camps in New York State, U.S.

- Interactive map of Raquette Lake Camps
- Coordinates: 43.821585°N 74.651134°W
- Established: 1916
- Website: raquettelake.com

Raquette Lake Camps is a pair of summer camps located in the center of the Adirondack Mountains in upstate New York, west of Lake George and south of Lake Placid. Raquette Lake Girls Camp and Raquette Lake Boys Camp are two of the oldest, continuously-operating summer camps in existence. Widely regarded as one of the premier summer camps in the United States, Raquette Lake Camps enroll around 400 campers each summer.

== History ==
In 1916 Ray K. Phillips established the Cedar Island Camp for girls on Fourth Lake, near Inlet, New York. In 1920 the Cedar Island Corporation, of which she was a member, purchased the Antlers Hotel on Raquette Lake and she moved the girls' camp to the Antlers property, changing the name to Raquette Lake Girls Camp. Construction on the present girls' camp site began in 1922. At that time she formed a partnership with Max Berg to build a boys' camp across the lake on Woods Point (Timm, 1989).

In 1951 Philips and Berg sold their camps on Raquette Lake. The hotel was acquired by S. & I. Hotels, the girls' camp by Lee Krinsky, and the boys' camp by Phil Drucker and Gordon Liebowitz (Timm, 1989). The boys' and girls' camps then operated as separately owned "brother and sister" camps. Drucker and Liebowitz sold the boys' camp to Dave Gold in 1967 and Krinsky sold the girls' camp in 1973 to Jerry Halsband, who also purchased the boys' camp from Gold, returning the two camps to unified ownership after 22 years. He owned both camps until 2000. From 1981 through 1995 Helene (Falk) Leibowitz (1943-2008) was head counselor. The "Helene Leibowitz" camper spirit awards named for her are given at the final campfire.

At times through their history the camps have alternately been named Raquette Lake Girls Club, Raquette Lake Boys Club, but have always been private, tuition-based summer camps.

Campers in the 1950s and 1960s travelled overnight by train in sleeping cars from Grand Central Station in New York City to the Thendara station, then transferred to the Town of Webb school buses to reach Raquette Lake. Girls were dropped off at their camp site but boys needed to walk down to the Antlers dock to ride the barge across to Woods Point.

== Facilities ==
Raquette Lake has tennis and pickle ball courts, sailboats, paddle boards, kayaks, canoes, power boats (including Ski Nautique water ski and wake-board boats), plus hardball diamonds, a batting cage, soccer and lacrosse fields, basketball courts, and volleyball courts. It has a gymnastics gymnasium with balance beams, mini-tramps, spring boards, sets of uneven parallel bars, vaulting horses, mats, a Tumble Trak and a springboard floor. Indoor recreational facilities include a social hall, theater, Arts and Crafts center, a ceramics studio, a dance studio, and a gymnasium. A ropes challenge course provides different high and low elements, including zip lines, and a three-sided climbing wall.

== Staffing ==
There is a 2:1 camper to staff ratio and an experienced adult leads each activity with the assistance of several counselors. Counselor staff are required to have completed their first year of college and undergo a background investigation. Activity Heads are typically current/former professionals or coaches in the program the direct. Group Leaders, who oversee age groups of campers and counselors, are educators and parents. Some staff members have served as long as twenty-five years.

== Activities ==
There is a day trip scheduled weekly at each camp. Trips are environmentally oriented, including; white water rafting, camping, canoeing, hiking and mountain climbing. In addition, a few recreational excursions are scheduled to the Olympic Training Center in Lake Placid, the Adirondack Museum in Blue Mountain Lake, the Baseball Hall of Fame in Cooperstown, Six Flags Great Escape & Splashwater Kingdom in Queensbury and a local water park. Special trips for teens include excursions to Montreal, New Hampshire, the Berkshires, and deep-lake fishing in Lake Ontario.

=== Girls Camp ===
The featured activities at the Girls Camp include: Arts and Crafts, Ceramics, Dance, Horseback Riding, Soccer, Basketball, Softball, Volleyball, Field Hockey, Lacrosse, Tennis, Gymnastics, Water Skiing, Wakeboarding, Canoeing, Kayaking, Swimming, Sailing, Fishing, Theatre Arts, Dance, and Ropes Course. 43.821585°N 74.651134°W

=== Boys Camp ===
The featured activities at the Boys Camp include: Basketball, Baseball, Tennis, Soccer, Flag Football, Lacrosse, Floor Hockey, Roller Hockey, Ice Hockey, Softball, Volleyball, Ultimate Frisbee, Archery, Drama, Water Skiing, Wakeboarding, Sailing, Windsurfing, Ropes Challenge Course, Fishing, High Peaks Adventure, Mountain Biking, Golf, Woodworking, and Arts and Crafts. 43.834682°N 74.63297°W

== Accommodations ==
Campers live with 6 to 16 other campers in a cabin with at least four counselors. Some older bunks, such as Supy (the oldest age group on the girls camp) can have up to 30 kids. Counselors reside in the cabins with the campers to ensure consistent safety and supervision. Each age group has Group Leader who reports to the Head Counselor. Each camp has a health center with a physician and three registered nurses.

== Accreditation ==
Raquette Lake Camps is a member of the New York State Camp Directors Association and an accredited member of the American Camping Association.
