= Antler, West Virginia =

Unincorporated community in West Virginia, United States

Antler
- Unincorporated community
- Location within the state of West Virginia Antler (the United States)
- Coordinates: 37°27′12″N 81°37′25″W
- Country: United States
- State: West Virginia
- County: McDowell
- Elevation: 1,299 ft (396 m)
- Time zone: UTC-5 (Eastern (EST))
  - Summer (DST): UTC-4 (EDT)
- Area codes: 304 & 681
- GNIS feature ID: 1553734

Antler is an unincorporated community in McDowell County, West Virginia, United States. Antler is located along the Tug Fork, 2.5 miles (4.0 km) northwest of Welch.
