= Antlers Hotel (Spirit Lake, Iowa) =

- U.S. National Register of Historic Places
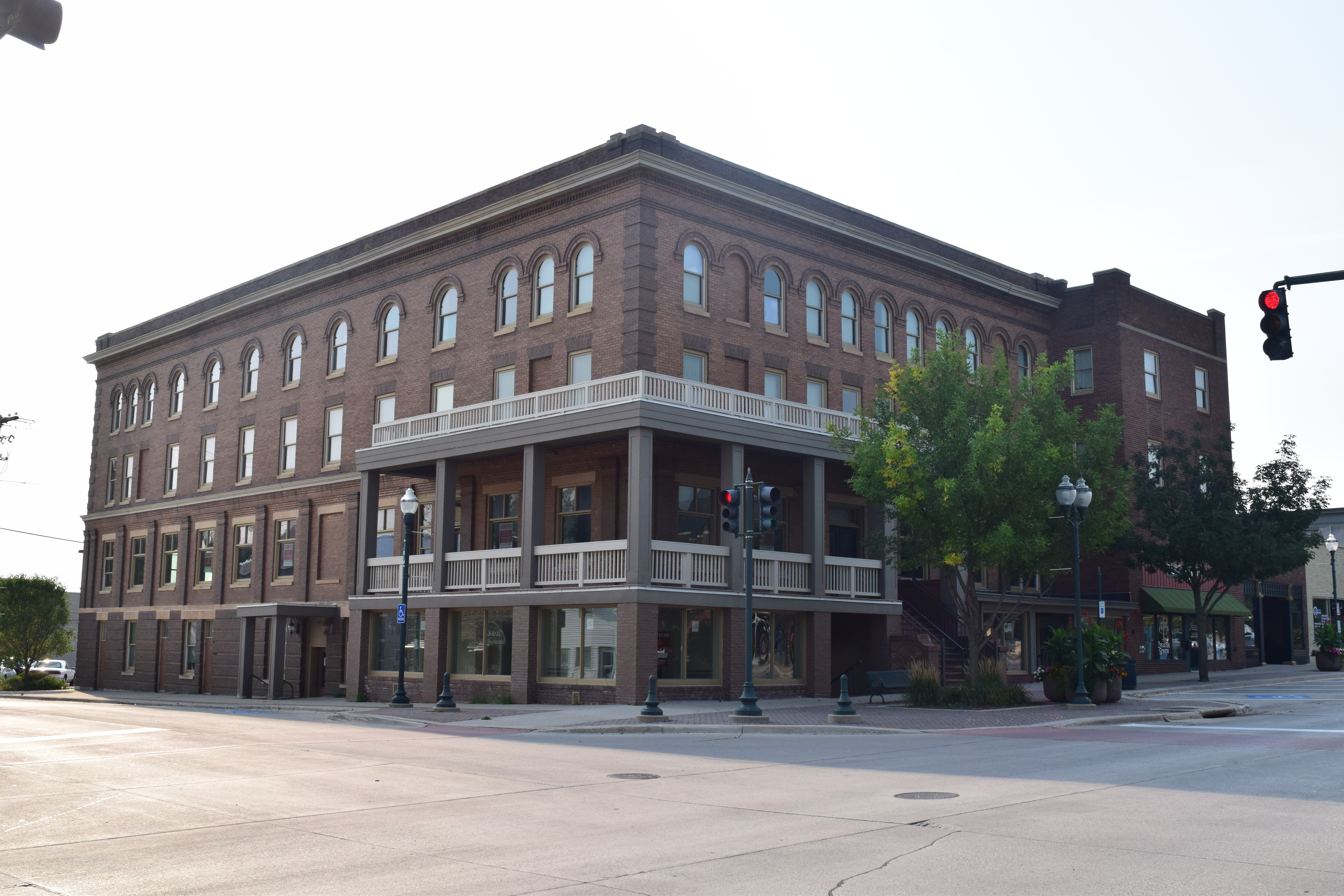

- Location within Iowa Location within the United States
- Location: 1703 Hill Ave. Spirit Lake, Iowa
- Coordinates: 43°25′23″N 95°06′07″W
- Area: less than one acre
- Built: 1902, 1930
- Architect: Frank W. Kinney
- Architectural style: Classical Revival
- NRHP reference No.: 07000452
- Added to NRHP: May 24, 2007

The Antlers Hotel is located in downtown Spirit Lake, Iowa, United States. From the 1880s to the early 1920s an alliance of railroad companies, entrepreneurs, and sportsmen made Spirit Lake and the Iowa Great Lakes region into an upscale tourist destination based on boating, hunting and gun tournaments. Completed in 1902, this hotel was built at the height of that development. A significant addition to the hotel was completed in 1930. Starting in the 1920s tourism started to change with the increasing usage of the automobile compared to the railroads. This is one of the few railroad-era tourism related buildings remaining in the area. It was designed in the Neoclassical style by Austin, Minnesota architect Frank W. Kinney. The three-story brick structure is built on a raised basement. It features brick columns, arched windows, ornamental cornices and a wrap-around veranda. Antlers Hotel was listed on the National Register of Historic Places in 2007. It has been renovated into a 14-unit apartment complex.
