= Antler, Missouri =

Extinct hamlet in Missouri, U.S.

Coordinates: 37°13′00″N 92°17′37″W

Antler is an extinct town in Wright County, in the U.S. state of Missouri.

The community was located on Missouri Route 95 approximately two miles south of Dawson and six miles north of Mountain Grove.

A post office called Antler was established in 1891, and remained in operation until 1907. The community was so named for the fact that antlers once were recovered in the area.
