= Security Building (St. Louis, Missouri) =

- U.S. National Register of Historic Places
- St. Louis Landmark
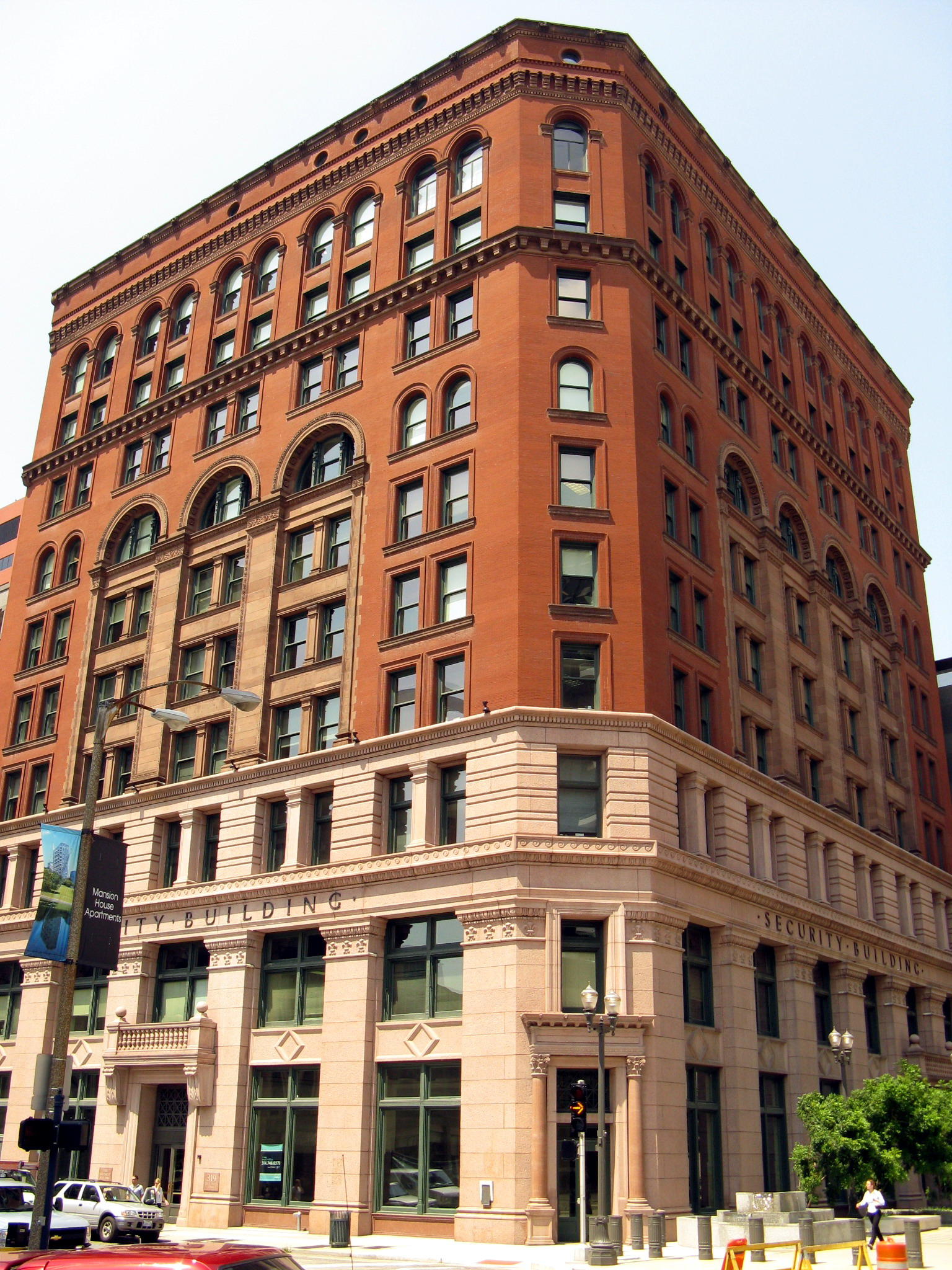

- Location within Missouri Location within the United States
- Location: 319 N. Fourth St., St. Louis, Missouri
- Coordinates: 38°37′47″N 90°11′16″W
- Area: less than one acre
- Built: 1890-92
- Architect: Peabody, Stearns & Furber
- Architectural style: Classical Revival
- NRHP reference No.: 00000083
- Added to NRHP: February 10, 2000

The Security Building is an 11-story building in St. Louis, Missouri, built in 1892 in what was then the city's downtown financial district. Designed by Boston architects Peabody, Stearns & Furber, the building consists of granite on the bottom two floors, with pink limestone and brick above. The building is featured on the National Register of Historic Places and has been designated as an official landmark by the City of St. Louis.

It was listed on the National Register in 2000. It was deemed notable due to its architecture and also as one of only eight remaining examples out of approximately 30 tall office buildings built in St. Louis in the late 1800s.
