= Antler (poet) =

American poet (born 1946)

- Born: Brad Burdick; 1946 (age 79–80); Wauwatosa, Wisconsin, U.S.
- Education: University of Wisconsin–Madison; University of Iowa
- Occupation: Poet

Antler (born Brad Burdick; 1946 in Wauwatosa, Wisconsin, U.S.) is an American poet who lives in Wisconsin.

Among other honors, Antler received the Whitman Prize from the Walt Whitman Association, given to the poet "whose contribution best reveals the continuing presence of Walt Whitman in American poetry," in 1985. Antler also was awarded the Witter Bynner Prize in 1987. Antler was the poet laureate of the city of Milwaukee, Wisconsin, for 2002 and 2003. He is also an advocate for wilderness protection.

== Education and career ==
Antler received a bachelor's degree in anthropology from the University of Wisconsin–Milwaukee in 1970. Later he completed a master's degree in English from the same university after spending some time at the noted Iowa Writers' Workshop at the University of Iowa. During the 1970s he also worked at various factory and other jobs just long enough to get money to support his poetry writing and time spent in wilderness areas across the United States.

Antler's first major work, the long poem Factory, was published by Lawrence Ferlinghetti's City Lights Bookstore in 1980. Allen Ginsberg declared him as "one of Whitman's `poets and orators to come'". The collection Last Words was published in 1986 by Ballantine Books, and Antler: The Selected Poems in 2000 by Soft Skull Press. He has also published several chapbooks and has contributed to numerous local, national, and international journals and anthologies.

== Writing style ==
His work reflects the influences of Walt Whitman, Allen Ginsberg, and the American traditions of transcendentalism and environmentalism. He celebrates the wilderness, often comparing urban, industrial life unfavorably with natural phenomena. His frank, sometimes earthy poems frequently exhibit sexual and spiritual energy entwined with the wonder of the natural world.

Factory gained Antler fame, and acclaim from archetypal Beat poet Allen Ginsburg, who compared it to his own iconic epic Howl. Howard Nelson made another comparison of style and content: “(Factory) may be the best encounter between industrialism and an out-manned, slapstick, very serious individual since Charlie Chaplin’s (1936 film) “Modern Times.”

In nevermorepoem.com., James Miller wrote: “His poetry often speaks to the sanctity of the natural world, positioning it as a source of wisdom and transcendence. He captures the beauty of landscapes, the presence of animals, and the mystical qualities of the wilderness. In an era when environmental consciousness was gaining traction, Antler’s poetry served as both a celebration of the Earth and a warning against its destruction.”

Pulitzer-Prize winning poet Gary Snyder underscores Miller’s perspective: “He’s one of the half-dozen or so truly committed wilderness poets in American letters.”

Antler published his most recent poetry collection, Touch Each Other in 2013 with FootHills Press. The collection’s poem “Now You Know” was set to music by Pulitzer-winning composer David Del Tredici.

Critical coverage included a positive review from Kevin Lynch in The Shepherd Express:

“He no longer rails, but his middle age still emits an eagle’s cry for vivid dreams and hope. The former Milwaukee poet laureate’s sly statistical research swirls into billowing ‘what ifs.’ Then, ‘The Come-Cries of the Unborn Come’ brilliantly marries birth to last days, and life’s continuum—disarming weary left-right dualisms. In another poem: ‘The existence of money and having to earn it was made up./ No wonder we’re floundering when no wonder is why we’re floundering.’”

In 2020, that newspaper’s Paul Masterson wrote, “Antler is recognized as Wisconsin’s greatest gay poet.”

== Books ==
- Factory - (1980) City Lights
- Last Words - (1986) Ballantine
- A Second Before it Bursts - (1994) Woodland Pattern Book Center
- Antler: The Selected Poems - (2000) Soft Skull Press
- Touch Each Other - (2013) FootHills Publishing

== Awards ==
- Whitman Award from the Whitman Society of Camden, New Jersey
- Witter Bynner Prize from the Academy & Institute of Arts and Letters in New York
