= Hudson Hall (University of Missouri) =

Coordinates: 38°56′30″N 92°19′21″W

Hudson Hall is an undergraduate residence hall on the University of Missouri campus.

== About ==
Located on the southeast corner of Rollins St. and Virginia Ave, Hudson Hall stands alongside Gillett Hall. Both halls are structurally connected to Rollins Hall, which serves as a social and educational hub and a link to the Rollins Dining Hall. Hudson is near the Christopher Bond Life Sciences Center and the Anheuser-Busch Natural Resource Building. The hall is co-ed, and has a capacity of nearly 480 students.

== History ==
The hall is named after William Hudson, President of the University of Missouri from 1856 to 1859. William Hudson was also the first mathematics professor at the university. Hudson Hall was built and opened in 1966.

== Present ==
Hudson Hall was renovated from 2008 to 2010, as part of the university's Residential Life Master Plan. The building received numerous upgrades, including new windows, carpeting, and central air conditioning.
