= Antlers Hotel (Colorado Springs, Colorado) =

Hotel in Colorado, US

Coordinates: 38°50′0.68″N 104°49′34.41″W

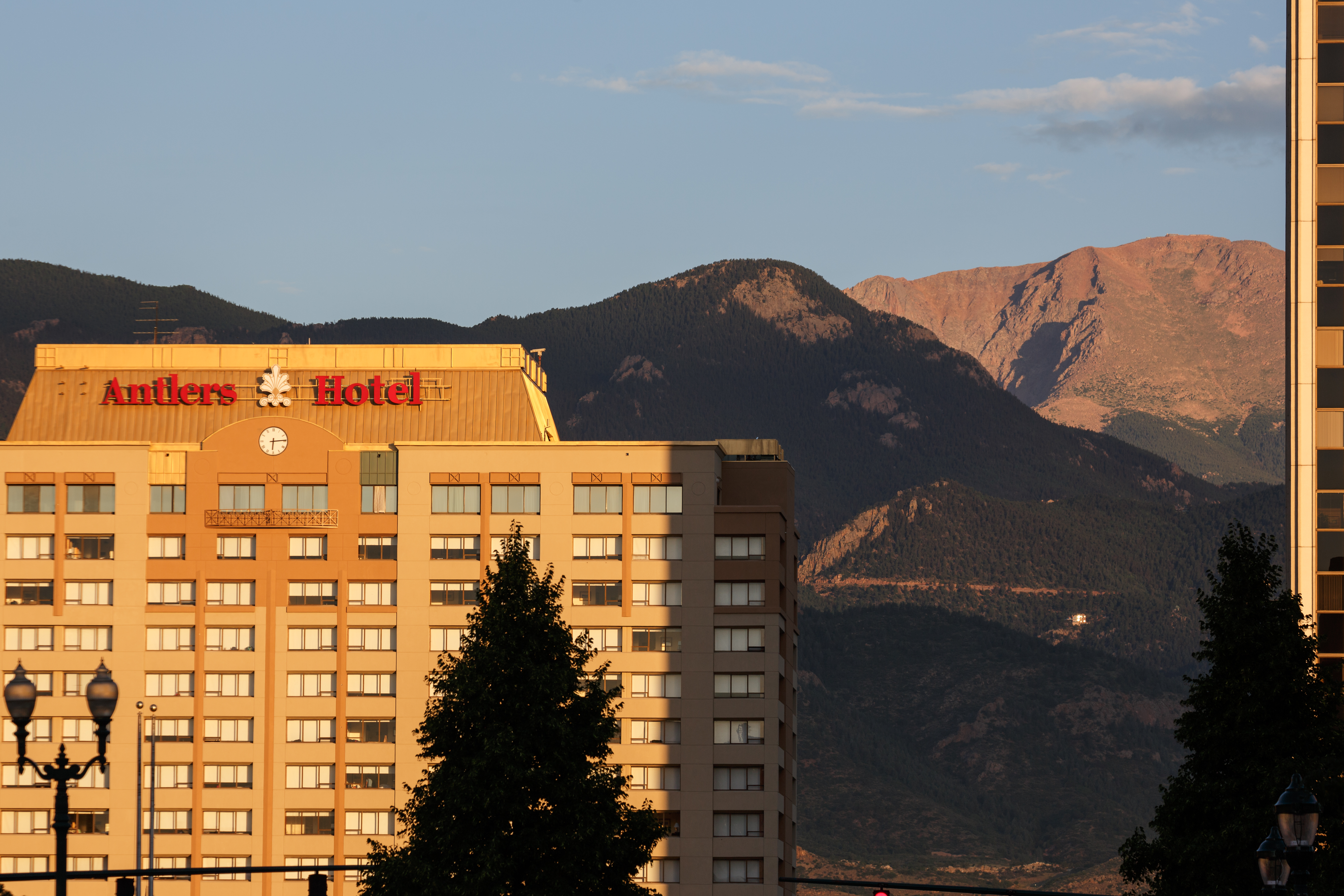
The Antlers in 2016

The Antlers is a Wyndham Hotel located in Colorado Springs, Colorado. It opened in 1967 and is the third hotel of that name on the same site.

The first Antlers Hotel was built in 1883 and burned down in 1898.

The second Antlers Hotel, completed in 1901, was torn down in 1964 to make way for the current Antlers.

== Geography ==
The hotel site is located in the center of downtown Colorado Springs, on Cascade Avenue, just off of Colorado Avenue. It is near Interstate 25. The hotel is near the former Denver and Rio Grande Western Railroad depot building and Antlers Park and adjacent to the Antlers Garage.

== Description ==
The downtown hotel has 272 rooms, including 14 executive suites, 5 junior suite, city facing governors suite and mountain facing founders suite. Within the hotel is 27,500 square feet of meeting space, an indoor pool, health club, beauty salon, breakfast restaurant, sports bar and lobby bar with 50 beers on tap and 50 wines by the glass.

== History ==
=== First building (1883–1898) ===
In June 1883, (Note: The Hilton site states that the hotel was founded in 1873, but sources consistently state that it opened in 1883 or June 1883. The 1879 City Directory for Colorado Springs does not have Antlers Hotel listed as a hotel. There is a hotel at Cascade and Pikes Peak, but it is the Colorado Springs Hotel and it is on the southeast corner.) twelve years after he founded the City of Colorado Springs as a railroad town, William Jackson Palmer built The Antlers hotel. The hotel was designed by Peabody & Stearns and Pierce P. Furber. It was built near the Denver and Rio Grande Western Railway (D&RGW), which Palmer had co-founded in 1870. The hotel was named for the large elk and deer racks that Palmer installed in the building. It had 75 unique guest rooms, a music room, Victorian Turkish baths, children's playroom, billiards room, and a barber shop. The hotel had gas lights, steam heat, hot and cold water, and a hydraulic elevator. It was unusually elegant for a hotel in the west. Palmer contributed $125,000 ($4.3 million today) towards the cost of its construction.

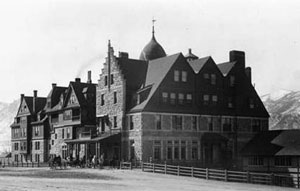
Antlers Hotel built in 1883 in downtown Colorado Springs

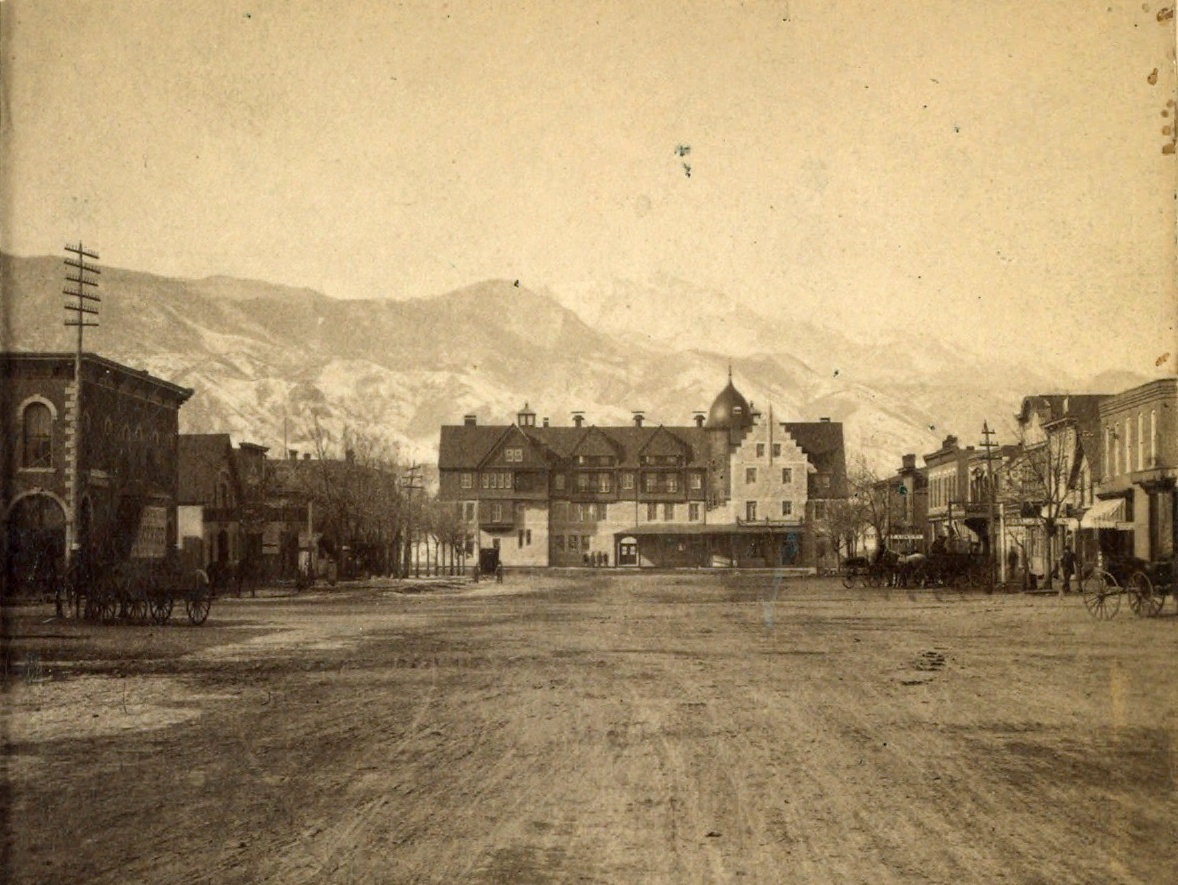
Antlers Hotel from Pikes Peak Avenue, 1880s

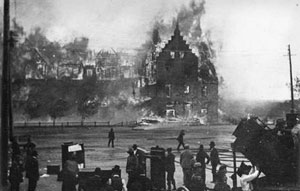
Antlers Hotel fire in 1898 in Colorado Springs, Colorado

The Antlers burned down on October 1, 1898, when a fire started at the nearby D&RGW freight depot. (Note: It is also reported, without further substantiation, that the fire started when a cinder from a passing train fell on the hotel and that several people were killed in the blaze.)

=== Second building (1901–1964) ===
Palmer rebuilt the hotel in 1901 with Italian Renaissance architecture, designed by the Varian and Sterner architectural firm. It was an elegant hotel with views of Pikes Peak, 200 rooms, a restaurant, the Rose Ballroom, fireproof walls, tapestries, and mosaic floors. Presidents who visited the hotel include Theodore Roosevelt, who gave a speech off a hotel balcony in 1901, Warren G. Harding and William Howard Taft. William Jackson Palmer died in 1909, after which Spencer Penrose attempted to buy the hotel but could not reach an agreement, leading him to build The Broadmoor in 1918. The last guest checked out on September 20, 1964, after which demolition began on the second Antlers Hotel building. (Note: The Colorado Historic Hotels book states that the building was torn down as the result of a fire.)

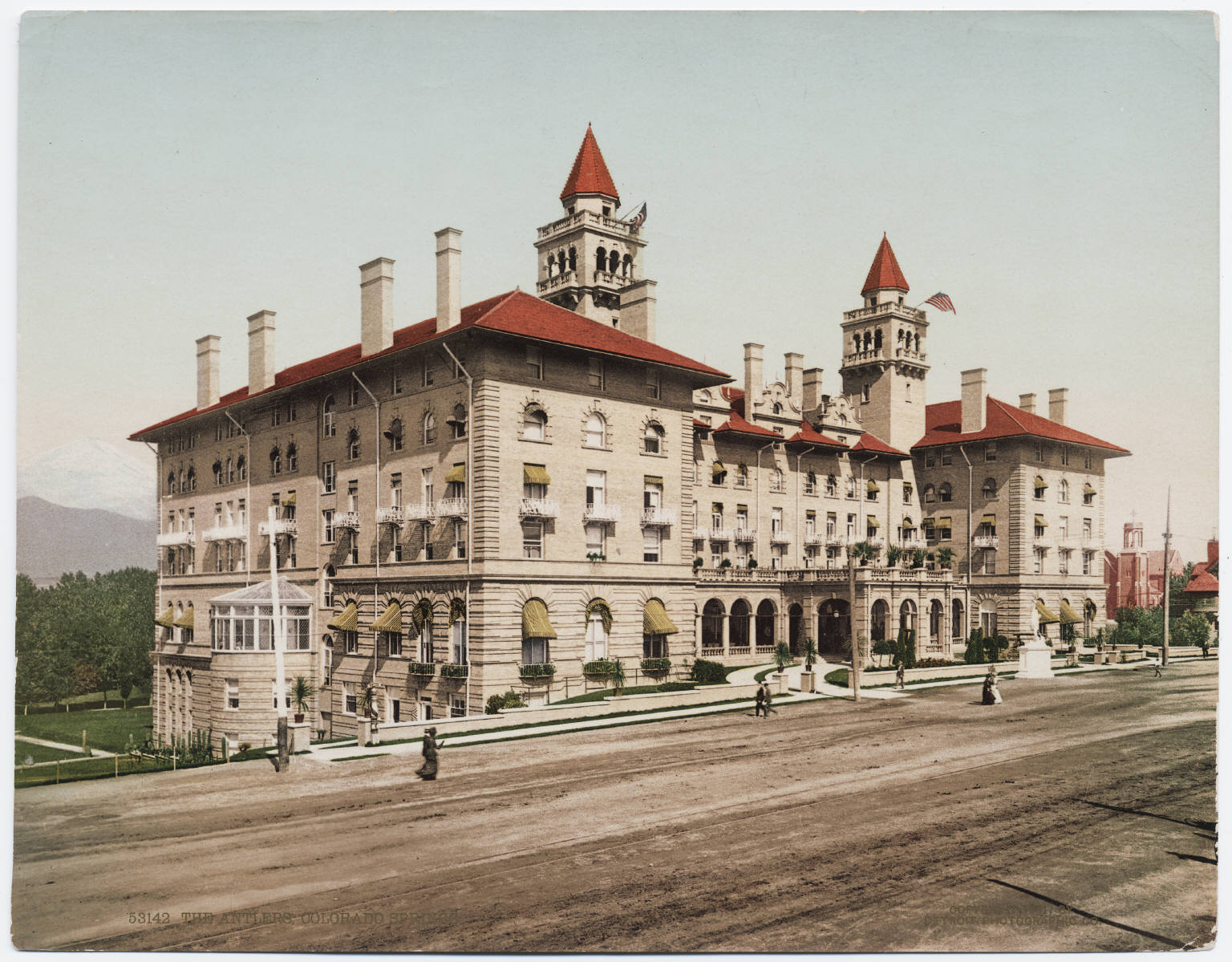
Northwest view of Antlers Hotel that was completed in 1901

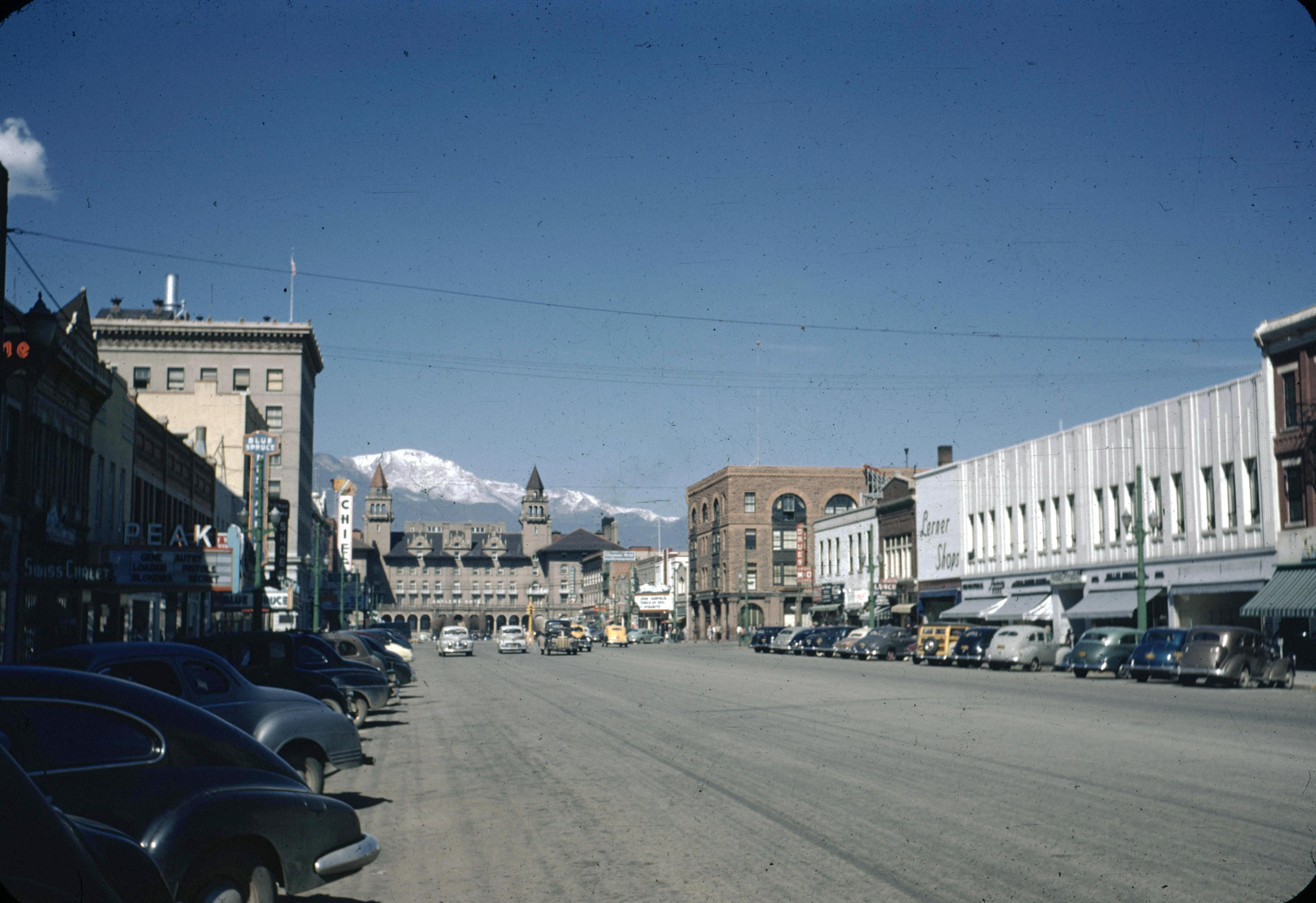
View to Antlers Hotel, 1948–49

=== Third building (1967–present) ===
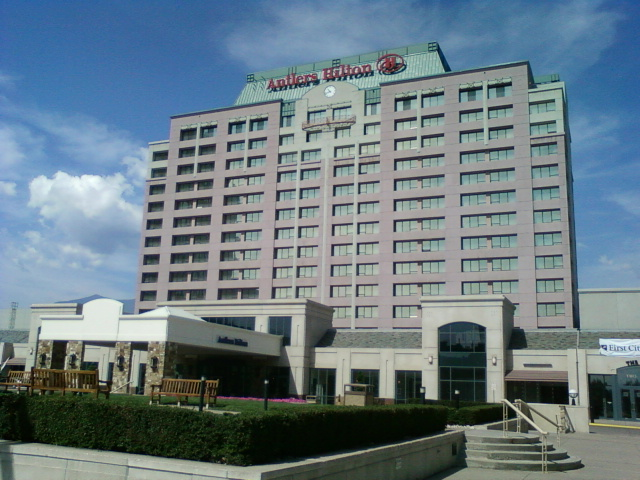
The Antlers in 2011, when it was a Hilton hotel

The current structure was built by Western International Hotels and opened on March 20, 1967, as the Antlers Plaza Hotel. The hotel is about 170 feet (52 m) tall with 14 floors.

Western International operated the hotel until March 31, 1975, when it was taken over by the Broadmoor Management Company, which shuttled guests to and from The Broadmoor in a double-decker London-styled bus. The Antlers hotel was remodeled for $24 million ($62.3 million today) in 1989–90. By 1998, the hotel was operating as the Antlers Doubletree Hotel, when it was sold to the Adam's Mark Hotels & Resorts for $35.4 million ($69.9 million today) and renamed the Antlers Adam's Mark.

The hotel was purchased for $27.2 million ($47.6 million today) in 2003 by a joint venture of Morgan Stanley Real Estate Group and Pyramid Hotel Group, which then spent an estimated $7.5 million ($13.1 million today) in renovations. When it announced the renovations to the 292 room hotel, the hotel changed its name from Antlers Adam's Mark Hotel to Antlers Hilton Hotel.

A limited liability company of LNR Partners of Miami Beach, Florida, which was the hotel's lender, took control of the firm in 2007. The hotel went into foreclosure and was purchased by an entity of LNR Partners at a foreclosure auction in December 2013.

On October 27, 2015, the property was purchased by attorneys Perry R. Sanders Jr. and John Goede. The new owners quickly dropped the Hilton name, returning the hotel to its original straightforward name of "The Antlers". On September 29, 2016, the hotel branded with Wyndham Hotels as The Antlers, A Wyndham Hotel., with Sanders and Goede retaining ownership of the hotel.

While there had been 24 hotels in downtown Colorado Springs in 1927, by 2015 the Antlers and the Mining Exchange were the only remaining downtown hotels.

== Bibliography ==
- Antlers Hotel. Colorado Springs' The Antlers Hotel: Largest and Finest Fireproof Hotel (1950s). Colorado Springs, Colorado: The Hotel.
- Antlers Hotel. (Colorado Springs, Colo.) (1908). The Hotel Antlers, Colorado Springs. Norman Pierce Company.
- Anne Christensen, The Gazette (December 31, 1999). "Antlers spreads world-class influence (1883 opening dinner)". The Gazette. Colorado Springs, Colorado. Archived from the original on March 29, 2015 – via HighBeam Research.
- Leland Feitz (1972). The Antlers, A Quick History of Colorado Springs' Historic Hotel. Golden Bell Press.
