= L. Ron Hubbard Residence at Bay Head =

Writers museum in New Jersey

- U.S. National Register of Historic Places
- U.S. Historic district – Contributing property
- New Jersey Register of Historic Places
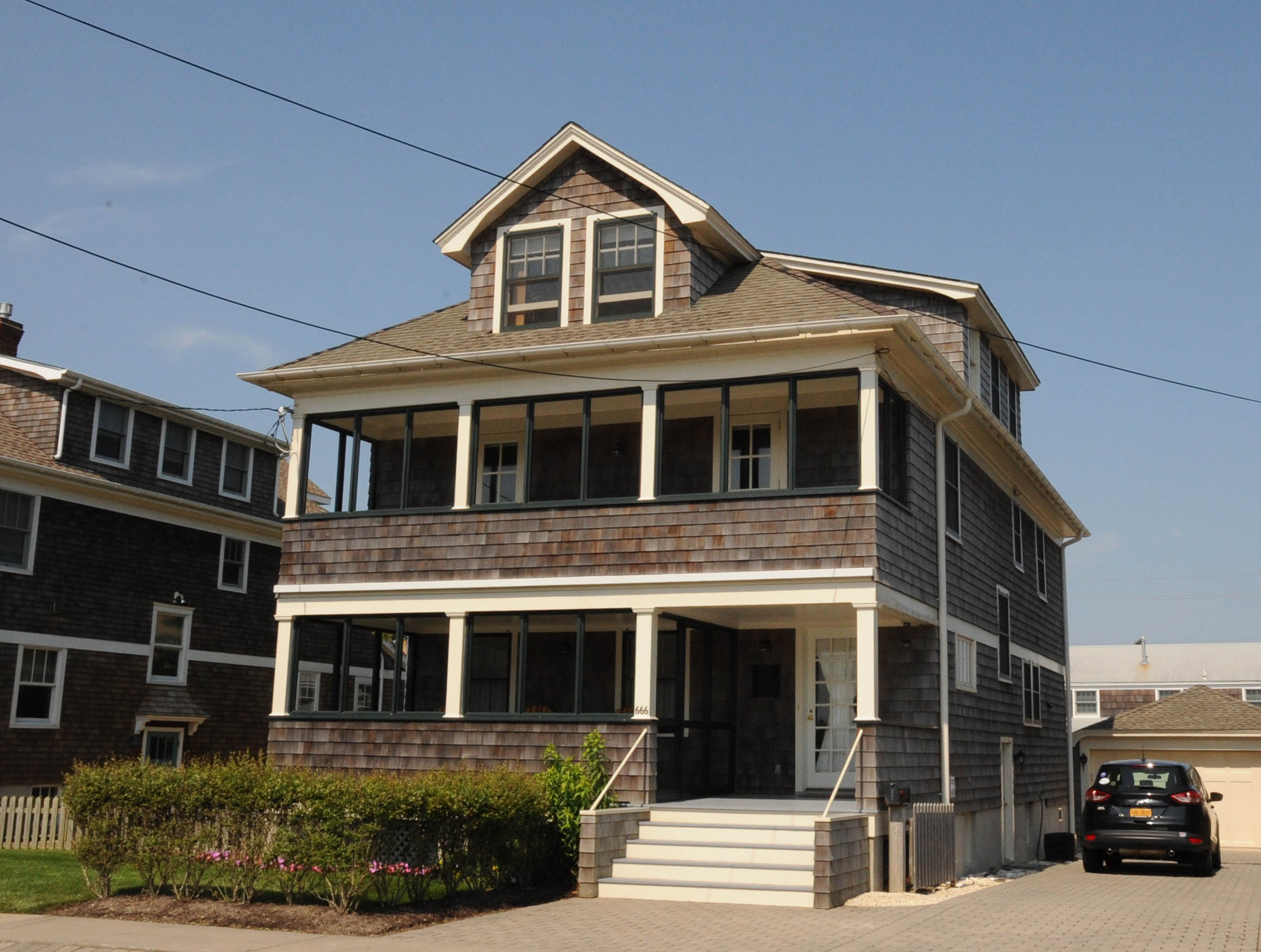

- Location within Ocean County, New Jersey Location within New Jersey Location within the United States
- Location: 666 East Avenue, Bay Head, New Jersey
- Coordinates: 40°3′50.4″N 74°2′40″W
- Built: c. 1910
- Architectural style: Shingle
- Part of: Bay Head Historic District (ID05001566)
- NRHP reference No.: 100001777
- NJRHP No.: 5453

Significant dates
- Added to NRHP: May 17, 2018
- Designated CP: February 1, 2006
- Designated NJRHP: September 14, 2017

The L. Ron Hubbard Residence is a historic Shingle style house located at 666 East Avenue in the borough of Bay Head in Ocean County, New Jersey, United States. Built c. 1910, it was added to the National Register of Historic Places on May 17, 2018, for its significance in literature, philosophy, and religion with respect to the work of L. Ron Hubbard. The house had previously been listed as a contributing property of the Bay Head Historic District in 2006.

== History and description ==
The house is a two and one-half story frame building constructed c. 1910 and located near the Atlantic Ocean. It combines American Foursquare and Shingle style architecture. American author Lafayette Ronald (L. Ron) Hubbard (1911–1986) lived here from September 1949 to June 1950. During this time, he wrote Dianetics: The Modern Science of Mental Health (1950), which became the basis of Scientology.

== See also ==
- National Register of Historic Places listings in Ocean County, New Jersey
- L. Ron Hubbard House – house in Washington, D.C.
