= Elizabeth Town & Country Club =

Coordinates: 40.61529°N 74.34367°W

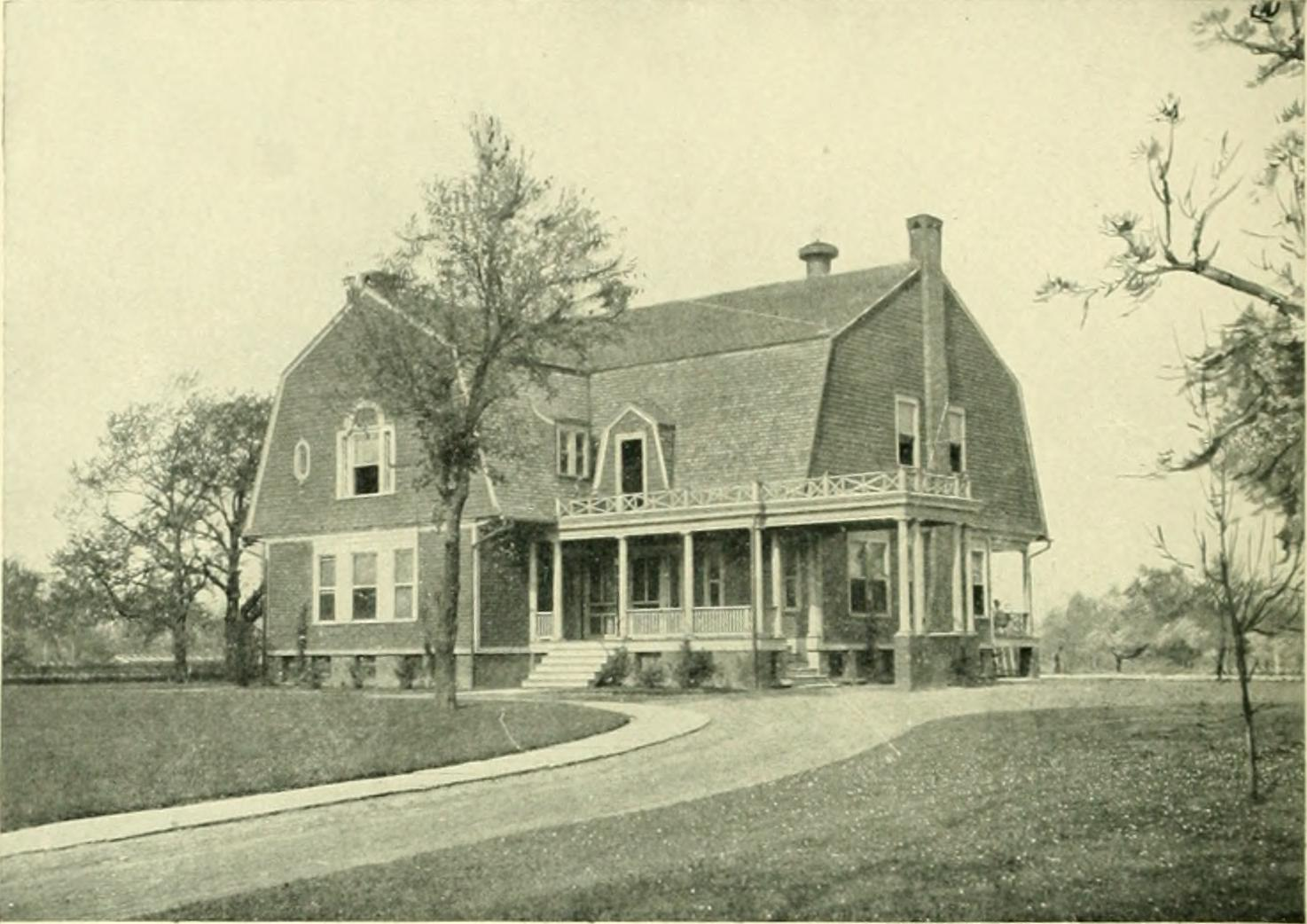
Elizabeth Town and Country Club

The Elizabeth Town & Country Club was an athletic and social club in Elizabeth, New Jersey that hosted a number of top amateur tennis tournaments during the last century. The club also hosted a number of social and political events for the citizens of Elizabeth and surrounding communities.

The club was founded in 1896 when land was acquired near North Broad Street in Elizabeth for a nine-hole golf course and clubhouse. Among Elizabeth Town's charter members was US Senator John Kean (New Jersey) and George C. Thomas, founder of the Thomas & Betts company. The original clubhouse was built in the Shingle Style architecture popular in the late 19th century. One of the club's first golf professionals was John Shippen, the African-American/Native American pioneer golfer.

After a fire in 1925, the clubhouse was rebuilt in American Colonial style, the results of which earned favorable reviews in the March, 1926 issue of Golf Illustrated. Shortly after though, the golf course was sold, and the main focus became tennis, squash and swimming. Elizabeth Town was the venue for such tournaments as the Eastern intercollegiate championships, the New Jersey State Open and the Eastern Father & Son Clay Court championships. Among the players who competed were Pancho Segura, Doris Hart and Peter Fleming, best known as John McEnroe's doubles partner, but a top singles player in his own right, having reached a world ranking of No. 8.

The Elizabeth Town Club was the scene of numerous receptions for local dignitaries such as US Labor Secretary James P. Mitchell and US Senator Harrison Williams as well as many private social affairs and weddings Among the members in the 1950s and 60s was New York Stock Exchange Chairman James C. Kellogg III and New York Knicks coach Eddie Donovan. In 1980 an outside banquet company began operating the clubhouse as "The Old Mansion" while members continued to enjoy the red clay tennis courts, swimming pool and squash courts. A frequent tennis guest in the 1990s was ex-Governor Brendan Byrne who sat on the Board of the nearby Elizabethtown Water Co. (now part of New Jersey American Water Company). In 2004, the property was sold to the City of Elizabeth Board of Education for construction of a new school, and the Elizabeth Town & Country Club came to an end.

The only trace of the club today is 'Country Club Lane', a small development of single family homes built adjacent to the club property on part of the original golf course.
