= Bay Head, New Jersey =

Borough in Ocean County, New Jersey, US

- Borough
- An aerial view of Greater Bay Head, featuring Twilight Lake

- Seal

- Location of Bay Head in Ocean County highlighted in red (right). Inset map: Location of Ocean County in New Jersey highlighted in orange (left).

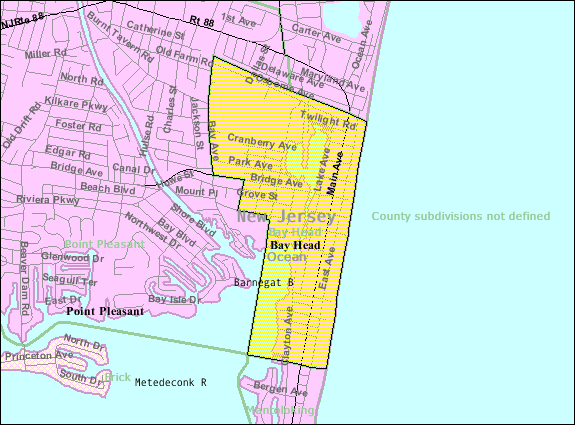
- Census Bureau map of Bay Head, New Jersey

- Location in Ocean County Location in New Jersey Location in the United States
- Coordinates: 40.070315°N 74.048162°W
- Country: United States
- State: New Jersey
- County: Ocean
- Incorporated: June 15, 1886
- Named for: Bayhead Land Company / location on Barnegat Bay

Government
  - Type: Borough
  - Body: Borough Council
  - Mayor: William W. Curtis (R, term ends December 31, 2027)
  - Administrator: Frank Pannucci Jr.
  - Municipal clerk: Antoinette Jones

Area
  - Total: 0.71 sq mi (1.83 km^{2})
  - Land: 0.59 sq mi (1.52 km^{2})
  - Water: 0.12 sq mi (0.32 km^{2}) 17.32%
  - Rank: 529th of 565 in state 30th of 33 in county
- Elevation: 3 ft (0.91 m)

Population (2020)
  - Total: 930
  - Estimate (2023): 965
  - Rank: 534th of 565 in state 30th of 33 in county
  - Density: 1,588.4/sq mi (613.3/km^{2})
  - Rank: 331st of 565 in state 16th of 33 in county
- Time zone: UTC−05:00 (Eastern (EST))
  - Summer (DST): UTC−04:00 (Eastern (EDT))
- ZIP Code: 08742
- Area code: 732
- FIPS code: 3402903520
- GNIS feature ID: 0885150
- Website: www.bayheadnj.org

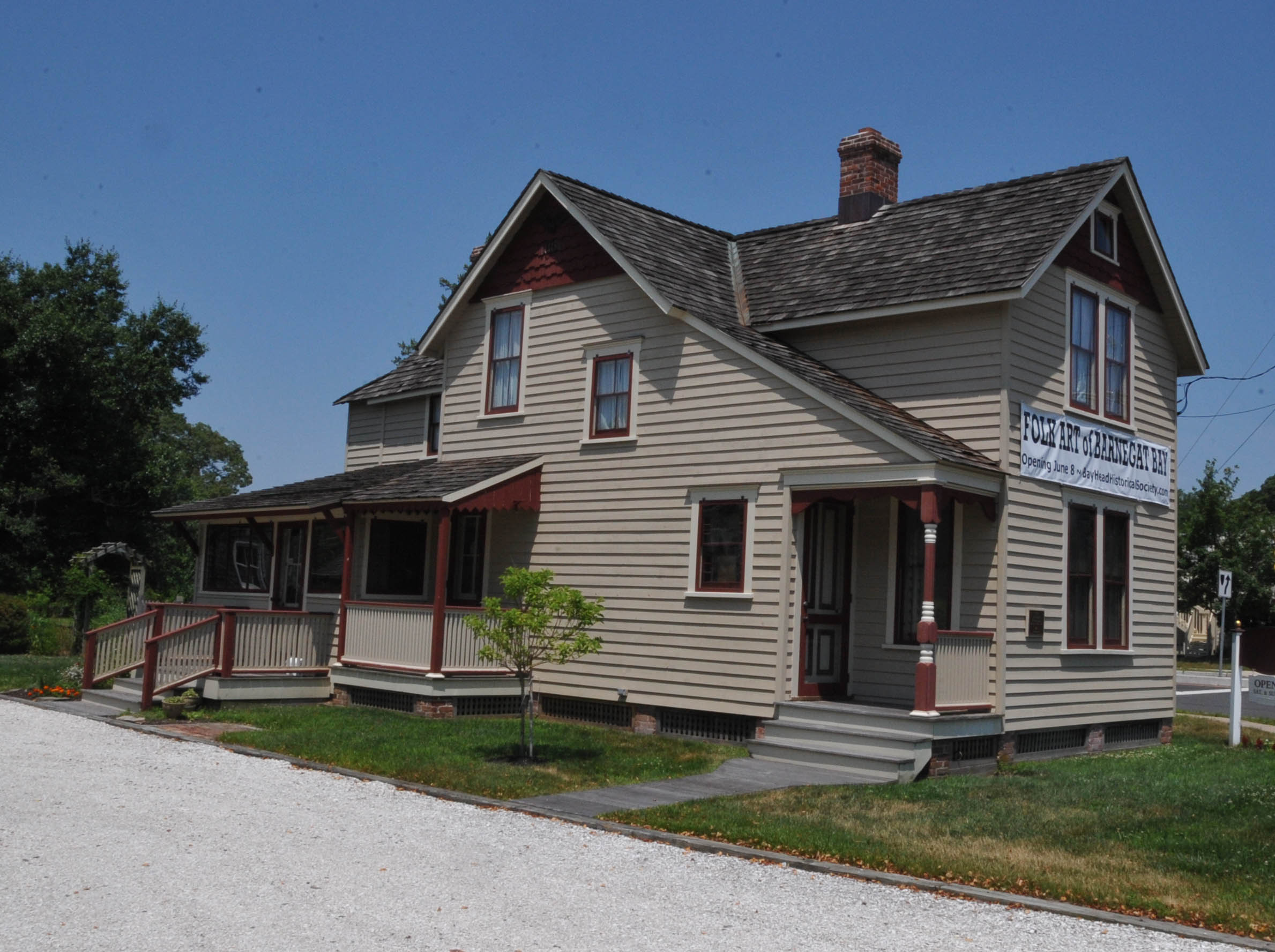
Loveland Homestead Museum

Bay Head is a borough situated on the Jersey Shore in northern Ocean County, in the U.S. state of New Jersey. As of the 2020 United States census, the borough's population was 930, a decrease of 38 (−3.9%) from the 2010 census count of 968, which in turn reflected a decline of 270 (−21.8%) from the 1,238 counted in the 2000 census. Bay Head is situated on the Barnegat Peninsula, also known as Barnegat Bay Island, a long, narrow barrier island that separates Barnegat Bay from the Atlantic Ocean. Together with Mantoloking, Bay Head is considered part of the Jersey Shore's "Gold Coast".

Bay Head was incorporated as a borough by an act of the New Jersey Legislature on June 15, 1886, from portions of Brick Township, based on the results of a referendum held three days earlier.

The community was supposed to have been named "Bayhead" after the Bayhead Land Company that developed the area in the 1870s. A railroad sign posted in the 1880s labeled the station as "Bay Head," and the name stuck when the borough was incorporated in 1886. The name also comes from the town's location, which is at the "head" of Barnegat Bay.

== History ==
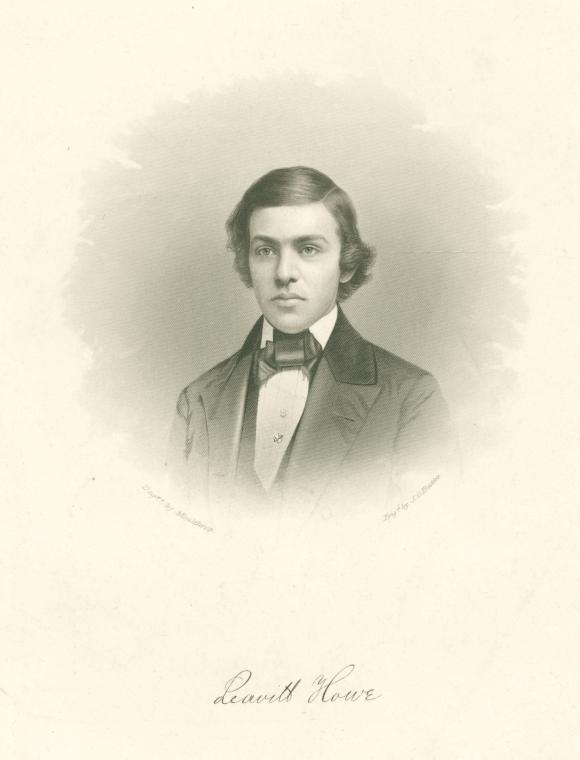
Leavitt Howe, founder with brother Edward Howe and two others of Bayhead Land Company, developers of Bay Head

The Bayhead Land Company was incorporated on September 6, 1879, capitalized at $12,000. The founding partners were David H. Mount of Rocky Hill, and three Princeton men: Edward Howe, his brother Leavitt Howe and William Harris. Within several years, the resort had grown in population, with a seawall installed, roads built and graded. In 1882, Bay Head had 20 new cottages and a population of 75.

The first post office was established in Bay Head in the summer of 1882. Julius Foster was first postmaster.

The Bay Head Historic District, listed in the New Jersey and the National Registers of Historic places in 2005, includes over 550 contributing structures (over half of the town's buildings) making it one of the largest historic districts in New Jersey. Bay Head's historic district is architecturally significant for its large collection of well-preserved Shingle style, Stick Style, and Queen Anne style structures.

The 1,260 metres (4,130 ft) stone rubble seawall built in 1882, which had been buried by dunes and largely forgotten, played a role in reducing damage to the town by Hurricane Sandy.

=== Beach replenishment ===
Night work at the waterline during the 2025 replenishment, with the dredge lit up offshore

Crew members watch an excavator empty a bucket of sand and water over a screening basket, July 2025

Much of Bay Head's oceanfront beach belongs to the private oceanfront properties rather than to the borough. After Hurricane Sandy, the New Jersey Department of Environmental Protection (NJDEP) gave emergency approval in February 2013 for 15 oceanfront property owners to build, at their own expense, a 1,300-foot (400 m) rock revetment topped with a dune, in line with an existing privately funded wall to its north; the mayor estimated its cost at about $2.2 million.

Bay Head is part of the United States Army Corps of Engineers' Manasquan Inlet to Barnegat Inlet project, also known as the Northern Ocean County coastal storm risk management project. In January 2017 the Corps and the NJDEP awarded Weeks Marine a base contract of $92 million, expected to reach about $128 million, to place about 11 million cubic yards of sand along 14 miles (23 km) of shoreline in nine municipalities, including Bay Head. The federal share of 65 percent came from the Disaster Relief Appropriations Act of 2013 and the state's 35 percent from its Shore Protection Fund, and the plan called for periodic replenishment over 50 years. Some oceanfront owners, who had spent about $5 million of their own money on the rock wall, argued that it protected their homes adequately and objected to giving up more of their beach for the dunes. In August 2017, Superior Court Judge Marlene Lynch Ford ruled for the state against oceanfront homeowners in Bay Head, Mantoloking and Point Pleasant Beach, having earlier upheld the state's use of eminent domain to obtain land for the project. Sand placement in Bay Head was scheduled as the last phase of the initial construction, beginning in May 2019 with Weeks Marine's dredge Magdalen.

In October 2024, the Corps awarded Great Lakes Dredge and Dock Company a $73.5 million contract to place about 2.1 million cubic yards of sand from offshore borrow areas between the Manasquan Inlet and Seaside Park, replacing sand lost since the 2017–2019 construction; about 495,000 cubic yards were allotted to Bay Head and its taper into Point Pleasant Beach. The work in Bay Head, originally expected to finish by early May 2025, fell several months behind schedule, with machinery closing off sections of beach about 1,000 feet (300 m) long at a time into the summer. News 12 New Jersey reported the project complete on July 23, 2025.

== Geography ==
Aerial view of Bay Head and Point Pleasant Beach from over the Atlantic Ocean, looking west-northwest, August 2025

According to the United States Census Bureau, the borough had a total area of 0.71 square miles (1.83 km^{2}), including 0.59 square miles (1.52 km^{2}) of land and 0.12 square miles (0.32 km^{2}) of water (17.32%).

Unincorporated communities, localities and place names located partially or completely within the borough include Twilight Lake.

The borough borders the Ocean County municipalities of Brick Township, Mantoloking, Point Pleasant and Point Pleasant Beach.

== Demographics ==
Historical population
Census	Pop.	Note	%±
1900	247		—
1910	281		13.8%
1920	273		−2.8%
1930	429		57.1%
1940	499		16.3%
1950	808		61.9%
1960	824		2.0%
1970	1,083		31.4%
1980	1,340		23.7%
1990	1,226		−8.5%
2000	1,238		1.0%
2010	968		−21.8%
2020	930		−3.9%
2023 (est.)	965	▲	3.8%
Population sources: 1900–2000 1900–1920; 1900–1910 1910–1930 1940–2000; 2000 2010 2020

=== 2010 census ===
The 2010 United States census counted 968 people, 459 households, and 270 families in the borough. The population density was 1,662.8 inhabitants per square mile (642.0/km^{2}). There were 1,023 housing units at an average density of 1,757.3 per square mile (678.5/km^{2}). The racial makeup was 98.55% (954) White, 0.52% (5) Black or African American, 0.00% (0) Native American, 0.72% (7) Asian, 0.00% (0) Pacific Islander, 0.00% (0) from other races, and 0.21% (2) from two or more races. Hispanic or Latino of any race were 1.03% (10) of the population.

Of the 459 households, 15.0% had children under the age of 18; 49.0% were married couples living together; 7.0% had a female householder with no husband present and 41.2% were non-families. Of all households, 37.0% were made up of individuals and 22.2% had someone living alone who was 65 years of age or older. The average household size was 2.11 and the average family size was 2.78.

15.5% of the population were under the age of 18, 4.3% from 18 to 24, 12.9% from 25 to 44, 32.9% from 45 to 64, and 34.4% who were 65 years of age or older. The median age was 57.2 years. For every 100 females, the population had 90.2 males. For every 100 females ages 18 and older there were 86.3 males.

The Census Bureau's 2006–2010 American Community Survey showed that (in 2010 inflation-adjusted dollars) median household income was $88,417 (with a margin of error of +/− $13,902) and the median family income was $134,583 (+/− $24,739). Males had a median income of $75,833 (+/− $22,227) versus $60,625 (+/− $37,439) for females. The per capita income for the borough was $78,226 (+/− $12,220). About 0.9% of families and 1.4% of the population were below the poverty line, including 4.0% of those under age 18 and none of those age 65 or over.

=== 2000 census ===
As of the 2000 United States census there were 1,238 people, 584 households, and 349 families residing in the borough. The population density was 2,094.3 inhabitants per square mile (808.6/km^{2}). There were 1,053 housing units at an average density of 1,781.3 per square mile (687.8/km^{2}). The racial makeup of the borough was 97.98% White, 0.16% African American, 0.08% Native American, 0.57% Asian, 0.48% from other races, and 0.73% from two or more races. Hispanic or Latino of any race were 1.29% of the population.

There were 584 households, out of which 16.6% had children under the age of 18 living with them, 51.5% were married couples living together, 5.8% had a female householder with no husband present, and 40.1% were non-families. 35.4% of all households were made up of individuals, and 14.2% had someone living alone who was 65 years of age or older. The average household size was 2.12 and the average family size was 2.73.

In the borough the population was spread out, with 15.4% under the age of 18, 4.0% from 18 to 24, 21.7% from 25 to 44, 33.7% from 45 to 64, and 25.2% who were 65 years of age or older. The median age was 52 years. For every 100 females, there were 90.2 males. For every 100 females age 18 and over, there were 88.3 males.

The median income for a household in the borough was $77,790, and the median income for a family was $93,055. Males had a median income of $64,063 versus $38,672 for females. The per capita income for the borough was $49,639. About 0.3% of families and 3.0% of the population were below the poverty line, including 2.8% of those under age 18 and 2.1% of those age 65 or over.

== Government ==
=== Local government ===
Bay Head is governed under the borough form of New Jersey municipal government, which is used in 218 municipalities (of the 564) statewide, making it the most common form of government in New Jersey. The governing body is comprised of the mayor and the borough council, with all positions elected at-large on a partisan basis as part of the November general election. The mayor is elected directly by the voters to a four-year term of office. The borough council includes six members elected to serve three-year terms on a staggered basis, with two seats coming up for election each year in a three-year cycle. The borough form of government used by Bay Head is a "weak mayor / strong council" government in which council members act as the legislative body with the mayor presiding at meetings and voting only in the event of a tie. The mayor can veto ordinances subject to an override by a two-thirds majority vote of the council. The mayor makes committee and liaison assignments for council members, and most appointments are made by the mayor with the advice and consent of the council.

As of 2024, the mayor of the Borough of Bay Head is Republican William W. Curtis, whose term of office ends December 31, 2027. Members of the Bay Head Borough Council are Council President Dennis J. Shaning (R, 2024), Jennifer Barnes-Gambert (R, 2026), Diane M. Cornell (R, 2024), James W. Gates Jr. (R, 2026), Douglas J. Lyons (R, 2025) and Holly MacPherson (R, 2025).

In February 2020, the borough council chose Andrew Frizzell from a list of three candidates nominated by the Republican municipal committee to fill the term expiring in December 2020 that became vacant following the resignation of Brian Magory.

=== Federal, state and county representation ===
Bay Head is located in the 4th Congressional district and is part of New Jersey's 10th state legislative district.

For the 119th United States Congress, New Jersey's 4th congressional district is represented by Chris Smith (R, Manchester Township). New Jersey is represented in the United States Senate by Democrats Cory Booker (Newark, term ends 2027) and Andy Kim (Moorestown, term ends 2031).

For the 2026–2027 session, the 10th legislative district of the New Jersey Legislature is represented in the State Senate by James W. Holzapfel (R, Toms River) and in the General Assembly by Paul Kanitra (R, Point Pleasant Beach) and Gregory P. McGuckin (R, Toms River).

Ocean County is governed by a Board of County Commissioners composed of five members who are elected on an at-large basis in partisan elections and serving staggered three-year terms of office, with either one or two seats coming up for election each year as part of the November general election. At an annual reorganization held in the beginning of January, the board chooses a director and a deputy director from among its members. As of 2025, Ocean County's Commissioners (with party affiliation, term-end year and residence) are:

John P. Kelly (R, 2025, Eagleswood Township), Virginia E. Haines (R, 2025, Toms River), Robert Arace (R, Manchester Township, 2027) Jennifer Bacchione (R, Berkeley Township, 2027) and Frank Sadeghi (R, 2026, Toms River).

Constitutional officers elected on a countywide basis are: Clerk Scott M. Colabella (R, 2025, Barnegat Light), Sheriff Michael G. Mastronardy (R, 2025; Toms River) and Surrogate Jeffrey Moran (R, 2028, Beachwood).

=== Politics ===
Presidential election results

United States presidential election results for Bay Head
Year	Republican		Democratic		Third party(ies)	
Year	No.	%	No.	%	No.	%
2024	373	54.37%	308	44.90%	5	0.73%
2020	392	53.92%	327	44.98%	8	1.10%
2016	339	53.64%	248	39.24%	45	7.12%
2012	374	66.08%	188	33.22%	4	0.71%
2008	443	63.56%	246	35.29%	8	1.15%
2004	515	68.58%	225	29.96%	11	1.46%
2000	472	67.05%	206	29.26%	26	3.69%
1996	431	64.91%	176	26.51%	57	8.58%
1992	492	65.25%	145	19.23%	117	15.52%
1988	567	79.97%	129	18.19%	13	1.83%
1984	599	79.44%	135	17.90%	20	2.65%
1980	656	65.93%	245	24.62%	94	9.45%
1976	487	76.33%	151	23.67%	0	0.00%
1972	501	80.03%	125	19.97%	0	0.00%
1968	391	75.92%	96	18.64%	28	5.44%
1964	340	63.79%	193	36.21%	0	0.00%
1960	424	85.48%	72	14.52%	0	0.00%
1956	456	92.31%	38	7.69%	0	0.00%
1952	423	85.45%	72	14.55%	0	0.00%
1948	318	80.92%	75	19.08%	0	0.00%
1944	231	77.52%	67	22.48%	0	0.00%
1940	255	77.74%	73	22.26%	0	0.00%
1936	224	68.71%	102	31.29%	0	0.00%
1932	240	76.92%	72	23.08%	0	0.00%
1924	165	82.50%	35	17.50%	0	0.00%
1920	113	73.86%	40	26.14%	0	0.00%
1916	68	74.73%	23	25.27%	0	0.00%
1912	19	23.46%	26	32.10%	36	44.44%

As of March 2011, there were a total of 837 registered voters in Bay Head, of which 115 (13.7%) were registered as Democrats, 453 (54.1%) were registered as Republicans and 269 (32.1%) were registered as Unaffiliated. There were no voters registered to other parties. Among the borough's 2010 Census population, 86.5% (vs. 63.2% in Ocean County) were registered to vote, including 102.3% of those ages 18 and over (vs. 82.6% countywide).

Bay Head has voted for all Republican presidential candidates since at least 1932, if not all but William Howard Taft's 1912 presidential campaign. The best showing was Dwight Eisenhower's 1956 re-election bid.

Gubernatorial election results for Bay Head
Year	Republican		Democratic		Third party(ies)	
Year	No.	%	No.	%	No.	%
2025	349	60.28%	230	39.72%	0	0.00%
2021	299	62.29%	180	37.50%	1	0.21%
2017	321	66.88%	152	31.67%	7	1.46%
2013	370	80.43%	82	17.83%	8	1.74%
2009	392	70.76%	124	22.38%	38	6.86%
2005	423	74.08%	137	23.99%	11	1.93%

In the 2013 gubernatorial election, Republican Chris Christie received 80.4% of the vote (370 cast), ahead of Democrat Barbara Buono with 17.8% (82 votes), and other candidates with 1.7% (8 votes), among the 471 ballots cast by the borough's 838 registered voters (11 ballots were spoiled), for a turnout of 56.2%. In the 2009 gubernatorial election, Republican Chris Christie received 70.3% of the vote (392 ballots cast), ahead of Democrat Jon Corzine with 22.2% (124 votes), Independent Chris Daggett with 6.3% (35 votes) and other candidates with 0.5% (3 votes), among the 558 ballots cast by the borough's 868 registered voters, yielding a 64.3% turnout.

United States Senate election results for Bay Head1
Year	Republican		Democratic		Third party(ies)	
Year	No.	%	No.	%	No.	%
2024	399	58.94%	274	40.47%	4	0.59%
2018	355	63.96%	180	32.43%	20	3.60%
2012	376	68.86%	162	29.67%	8	1.47%
2006	371	69.87%	151	28.44%	9	1.69%

United States Senate election results for Bay Head2
Year	Republican		Democratic		Third party(ies)	
Year	No.	%	No.	%	No.	%
2020	415	58.62%	282	39.83%	11	1.55%
2014	297	65.85%	147	32.59%	7	1.55%
2013	231	66.00%	116	33.14%	3	0.86%
2008	445	68.89%	190	29.41%	11	1.70%

== Education ==
The Bay Head School District serves students in public school for pre-kindergarten through eighth grade at Bay Head Elementary School. As of the 2022–23 school year, the district, comprised of one school, had an enrollment of 125 students and 14.5 classroom teachers (on an FTE basis), for a student–teacher ratio of 8.7:1. The district was ranked as one of the smallest in the state in 2016–17.

Students in public school for ninth through twelfth grades attend Point Pleasant Beach High School in Point Pleasant Beach, as part of a sending/receiving relationship with the Point Pleasant Beach School District, together with students from Lavallette and Mantoloking. As of the 2022–23 school year, the high school had an enrollment of 358 students and 38.4 classroom teachers (on an FTE basis), for a student–teacher ratio of 9.3:1.

The Bay Head Yacht Club and surrounding properties.

== Transportation ==
Bay Head station, the South terminus of NJ Transit's North Jersey Coast Line

=== Roads and highways ===
As of May 2010, the borough had a total of 10.74 miles (17.28 km) of roadways, of which 8.24 miles (13.26 km) were maintained by the municipality, 1.16 miles (1.87 km) by Ocean County and 1.34 miles (2.16 km) by the New Jersey Department of Transportation.

The main roadway through Bay Head is Route 35, a two-lane highway that connects many of the Jersey Shore's small communities.

=== Public transportation ===
NJ Transit trains terminate at the Bay Head station and yard, with service on the North Jersey Coast Line north to Newark Penn Station, Hoboken Terminal, and New York Penn Station in Midtown Manhattan.

== Climate ==
According to the Köppen climate classification system, Bay Head has a Humid subtropical climate (Cfa).

Climate data for Bay Head (40.0706, -74.0455), Elevation 3 ft (1 m), 1991–2020 normals, extremes 1981–2022
Month	Jan	Feb	Mar	Apr	May	Jun	Jul	Aug	Sep	Oct	Nov	Dec	Year
Record high °F (°C)	71.2 (21.8)	78.6 (25.9)	82.5 (28.1)	89.8 (32.1)	94.8 (34.9)	96.8 (36.0)	100.3 (37.9)	99.8 (37.7)	97.2 (36.2)	93.5 (34.2)	79.8 (26.6)	74.4 (23.6)	100.3 (37.9)
Mean daily maximum °F (°C)	41.1 (5.1)	42.7 (5.9)	48.5 (9.2)	58.8 (14.9)	68.4 (20.2)	77.9 (25.5)	83.2 (28.4)	81.7 (27.6)	75.8 (24.3)	65.3 (18.5)	55.0 (12.8)	46.4 (8.0)	62.2 (16.8)
Mean daily minimum °F (°C)	25.7 (−3.5)	26.9 (−2.8)	33.3 (0.7)	42.6 (5.9)	52.1 (11.2)	61.6 (16.4)	67.7 (19.8)	66.6 (19.2)	60.2 (15.7)	48.4 (9.1)	38.5 (3.6)	31.0 (−0.6)	46.3 (7.9)
Record low °F (°C)	−5.2 (−20.7)	0.3 (−17.6)	6.6 (−14.1)	18.5 (−7.5)	34.8 (1.6)	45.0 (7.2)	50.1 (10.1)	45.4 (7.4)	40.6 (4.8)	27.9 (−2.3)	14.6 (−9.7)	0.8 (−17.3)	−5.2 (−20.7)
Average precipitation inches (mm)	3.85 (98)	3.35 (85)	4.50 (114)	3.71 (94)	3.68 (93)	4.19 (106)	4.26 (108)	4.48 (114)	3.76 (96)	4.32 (110)	3.63 (92)	4.82 (122)	48.56 (1,233)
Average snowfall inches (cm)	8.1 (21)	6.2 (16)	3.8 (9.7)	0.1 (0.25)	0.0 (0.0)	0.0 (0.0)	0.0 (0.0)	0.0 (0.0)	0.0 (0.0)	0.0 (0.0)	0.4 (1.0)	3.5 (8.9)	22.2 (56)
Average dew point °F (°C)	22.6 (−5.2)	23.2 (−4.9)	28.3 (−2.1)	37.4 (3.0)	48.8 (9.3)	59.5 (15.3)	64.8 (18.2)	64.1 (17.8)	58.7 (14.8)	47.1 (8.4)	36.3 (2.4)	28.4 (−2.0)	43.4 (6.3)
Source 1: PRISM
Source 2: NOHRSC (Snow, 2008/2009 - 2022/2023 normals)

Climate data for Atlantic City, NJ Ocean Water Temperature, 1911–present normals
Month	Jan	Feb	Mar	Apr	May	Jun	Jul	Aug	Sep	Oct	Nov	Dec	Year
Daily mean °F (°C)	39.7 (4.3)	38.5 (3.6)	41.9 (5.5)	48.7 (9.3)	56.4 (13.6)	64.7 (18.2)	68.9 (20.5)	73.1 (22.8)	72.2 (22.3)	64.1 (17.8)	53.6 (12.0)	45.2 (7.3)	55.7 (13.2)
Source: NCEI

== Ecology ==
According to the A. W. Kuchler U.S. potential natural vegetation types, Bay Head would have an Appalachian Oak (104) vegetation type with an Eastern Hardwood Forest (25) vegetation form.

== Notable people ==
People who were born in, residents of, or otherwise closely associated with Bay Head include:

- Bobbi Brown (born 1957), cosmetologist and media contributor
- Dean Cetrulo (1919–2010), fencer who won a bronze medal in the team sabre event at the 1948 Summer Olympics
- Leavitt Howe (1836–1904), founder with brother Edward Howe and two others of Bayhead Land Company, 1879
- L. Ron Hubbard (1911–1986), who wrote Dianetics: The Modern Science of Mental Health, the basis for Scientology in Bay Head in 1950
- James C. Kellogg III (1915–1980), Chairman of the Port Authority of New York and New Jersey
- Peter Kellogg (born 1943), director of the Wall Street investment firm Spear, Leeds & Kellogg, which was sold to Goldman Sachs in 2000 for $5.5 billion
- Roger King (1944–2007), Producer, Owner of King World Productions, produces game shows such as Wheel of Fortune, and Jeopardy!; and co-produces alongside Oprah Winfrey and Dr. Phil McGraw
- John B. Paolella (born 1949), politician who represented the 38th Legislative District in both houses of the New Jersey Legislature
- Dana Perino (born 1972), political commentator
- Michael F. Price (1951–2022), value investor and fund manager
- Ron San Fillipo (1942–2024), athletic director and athletics coach
- Val Skinner (born 1960), LPGA golfer
- John Wanamaker (1838–1922), retailer who spent many summers at his cottage at the beach

Preceded by Point Pleasant Beach	Beaches of New Jersey	Succeeded by Mantoloking
