= James C. Kellogg III =

American businessman (1915–1980)

James C. Kellogg III (1915–1980) was Chairman of the Port Authority of New York & New Jersey and chairman of the Board of Governors of the New York Stock Exchange.

Kellogg attended the Pingry School, graduating in the class of 1933. He became the youngest member of the NYSE, purchasing his seat at age 21 in 1936, and the youngest person to be elected chairman, a position he held from 1956 to 1958. Mr. Kellogg was senior partner in the Wall Street specialty firm of Spear, Leeds & Kellogg, a position later held by his son Peter Kellogg. The firm was acquired by Goldman Sachs in November, 2000 in a deal valued at US$6.5 billion.

Kellogg was a longtime resident of Elizabeth and Bay Head, New Jersey and was active in local affairs. The Kelloggs were a prominent landowning family in Elizabeth, and bequeathed several tracts of land to the city for use as public space: Jackson, Jefferson, and North (later renamed Kellogg) Parks. James Kellogg was a nephew of industrialist M.W. Kellogg.

Mr. Kellogg was a Democratic nominee for Union County Freeholder in 1954, a trustee of Children's Specialized Hospital and President of the Elizabeth Town & Country Club. He was also a trustee of the South Street Seaport Museum in New York and a member of the finance committee of his alma mater, Williams College.

== Notes ==
Political offices
Preceded by S. Sloan Colt	Chairman of the Port Authority of New York and New Jersey; 1968-1974	Succeeded by William Ronan
