= Bay Head Historic District =

Historic district in New Jersey, United States

- U.S. National Register of Historic Places
- U.S. Historic district
- New Jersey Register of Historic Places
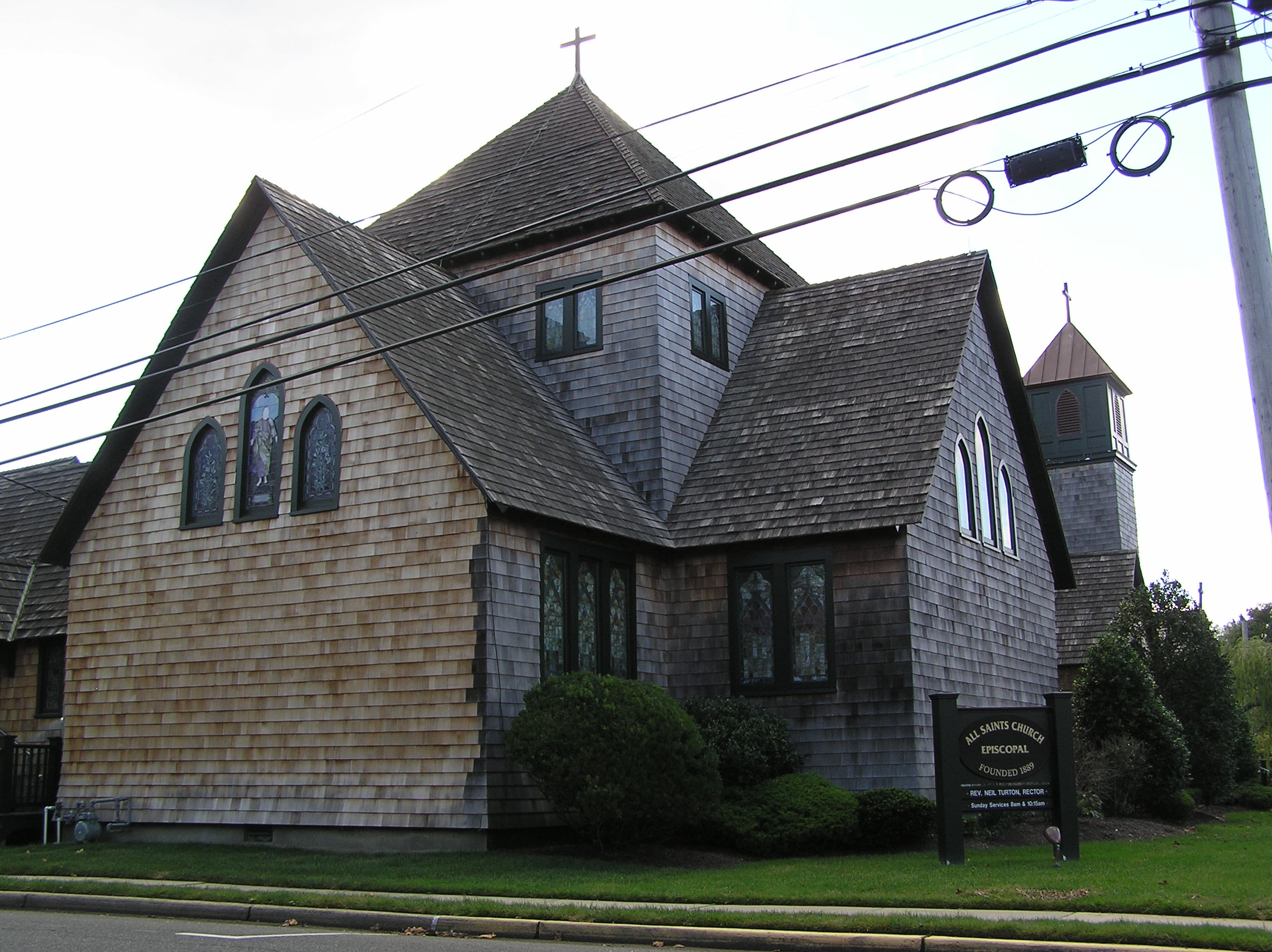
- All Saints Episcopal Church in 2012

- Location within Ocean County, New Jersey Location within New Jersey Location within the United States
- Location: Roughly bounded by Point Pleasant Beach Borough line, Atlantic Ocean, Manotoloking Borough line and Point Pleasant; Bay Head, New Jersey
- Coordinates: 40°04′18″N 74°02′51″W
- Area: 440 acres (180 ha)
- Built: 1877
- Architect: Wilson Eyre Jr.
- Architectural style: Shingle Style, Colonial Revival
- NRHP reference No.: 05001566
- NJRHP No.: 3402

Significant dates
- Added to NRHP: February 1, 2006
- Designated NJRHP: November 18, 2005

The Bay Head Historic District is a 440-acre (180 ha) historic district in the borough of Bay Head in Ocean County, New Jersey, United States. This residential district located along the Atlantic Ocean was added to the National Register of Historic Places (NRHP) on February 1, 2006, for its significance in architecture and transportation from 1877 to 1940. It includes 549 contributing buildings, two contributing sites, and one contributing structure. Part of the district extends into Point Pleasant. In 2018, the L. Ron Hubbard Residence at Bay Head, a contributing building featuring Shingle style architecture, was listed individually on the NRHP. The All Saints Episcopal Church was built in 1889 and is the oldest church in the borough. The Bay Head Chapel was remodeled in the 1940s to feature Colonial Revival architecture. The Greenville Arms was designed by architect Wilson Eyre Jr., an innovator of the Shingle style.

== Gallery of contributing properties ==
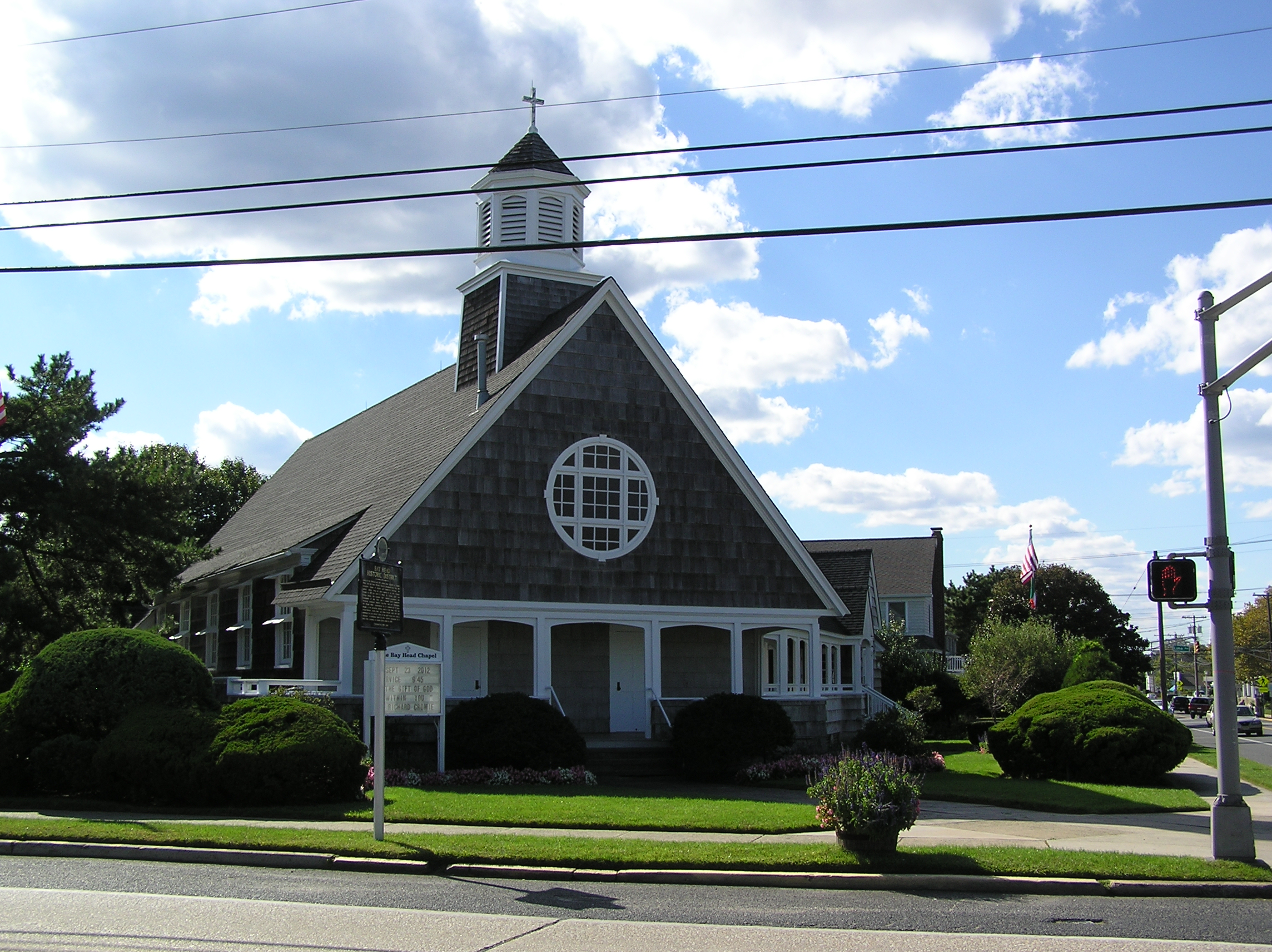
Bay Head Chapel

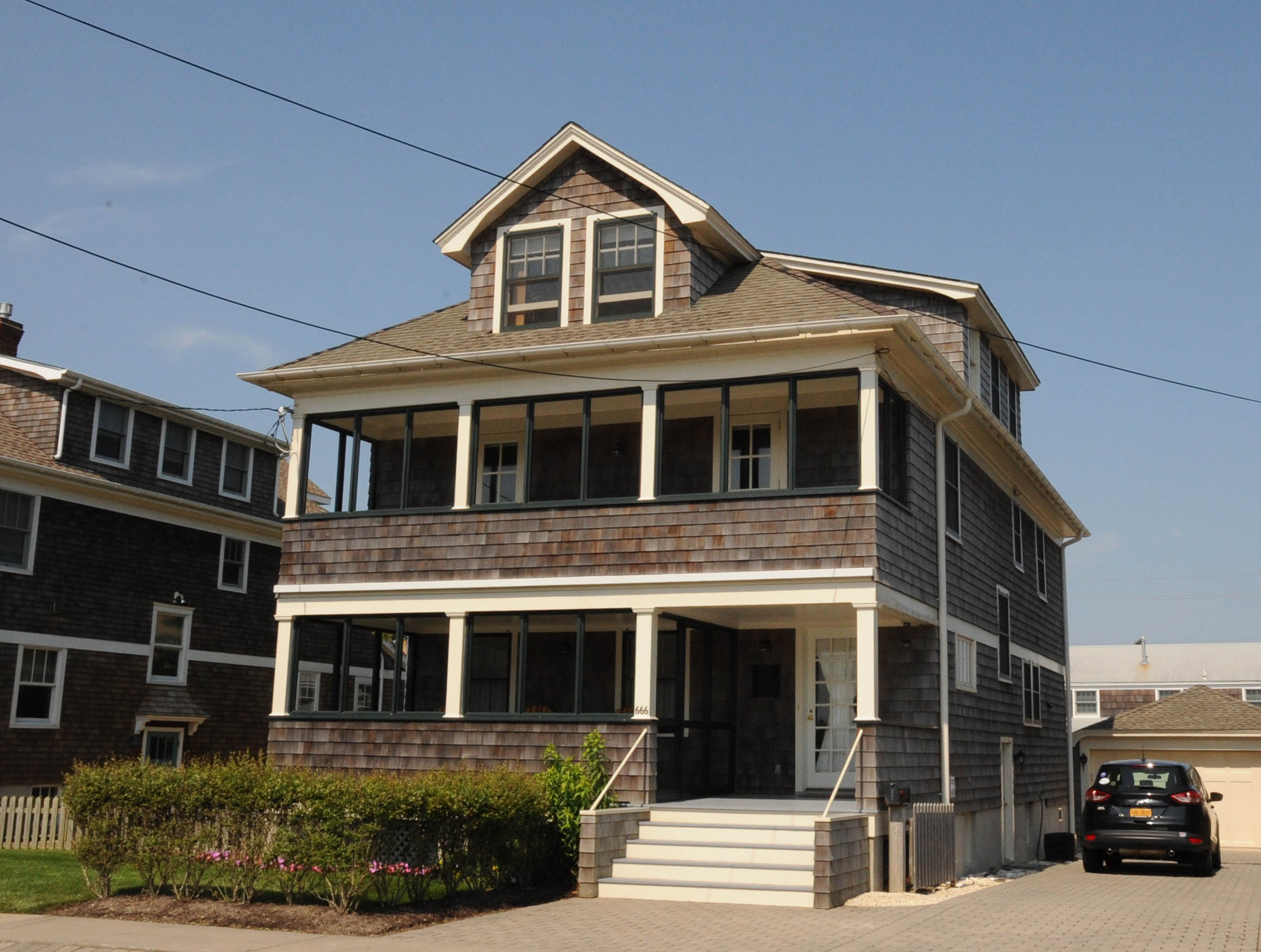
L. Ron Hubbard Residence

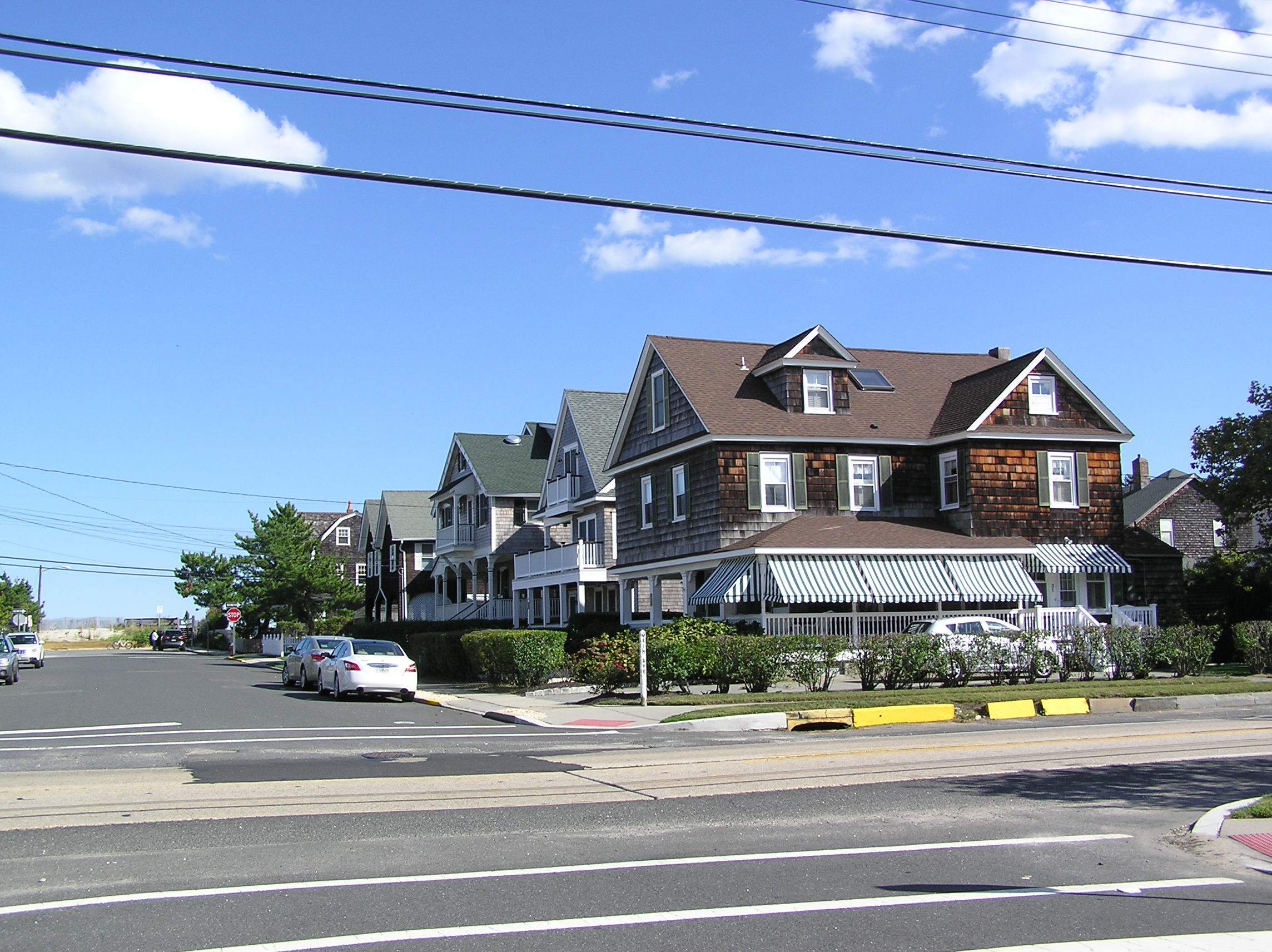
Shingle Style houses on Harris Street

== See also ==
- National Register of Historic Places listings in Ocean County, New Jersey
