= William G. Low House =

Coordinates: 41°38′53″N 71°15′48″W

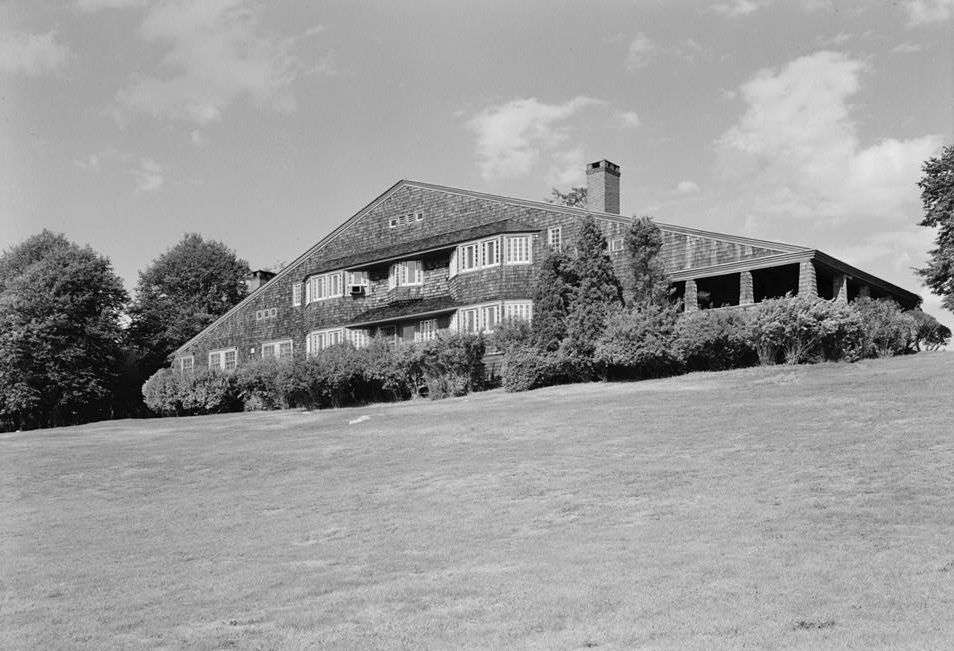
- 1962 photo from the Historic American Buildings Survey
- Interactive map of the William G. Low House area

General information
- Status: Demolished
- Type: Seaside cottage
- Architectural style: Shingle style
- Location: 3 Low Lane, Bristol, Rhode Island
- Construction started: 1886
- Completed: 1887
- Demolished: 1962
- Client: William G. Low

Design and construction
- Architect: Charles McKim
- Architecture firm: McKim, Mead & White
- Known for: An extreme example of the Shingle style

The William G. Low House was a shingle style seaside cottage in Bristol, Rhode Island, United States. It was designed and built in 1886–1887 by architect Charles McKim of the New York City firm, McKim, Mead & White. With its distinctive single 140-foot-long (43 m) gable it embodied many of the tenets of shingle style architecture—horizontality, simplified massing and geometry, minimal ornamentation, the blending of interior and exterior spaces.

The architectural historian Vincent Scully saw it as "at once a climax and a kind of conclusion" for McKim, since its "prototypal form ... was almost immediately to be abandoned for the more conventionally conceived columns and pediments of McKim, Mead, and White's later buildings."

Just before it was demolished in 1962, the house was documented with measured drawings and photographs by the Historic American Buildings Survey.

Wrote architectural historian Leland Roth, "Although little known in its own time, the Low House has come to represent the high mark of the Shingle Style."

The house was built for William Gilman Low (1844–1936), a lawyer and stepson of Abiel Abbot Low, and Lois Robbins Low (1850–1923), his wife and a daughter of Benjamin Robbins Curtis. Low died in the house at the age of 92.
