= Peter Kellogg =

American businessman

- Born: September 5, 1942 (age 84)
- Education: Babson College (dropped out)
- Spouse: Cynthia Kirkland Kellogg
- Children: 3
- Parent: James C. Kellogg III

Peter R. Kellogg (born September 5, 1942), is an American businessman with a net worth estimated by Forbes at around $3.4 billion, primarily derived from his leadership of Wall Street firm Spear, Leeds & Kellogg.

== Personal ==
Kellogg attended the Rectory School and the Berkshire School. He matriculated at Babson College, but dropped out. He is the son of James Crane Kellogg III of Wall Street specialist firm Spear, Leeds & Kellogg. After working at Dominick & Dominick, he joined his father's firm in 1967, leading it from the 1980s to its 2000 sale to Goldman Sachs for a reported $6.5 billion.

Kellogg summers in Mantoloking, New Jersey.

== NYSE ==
The NASD publicly announced on November 3, 2003, that it had "filed a disciplinary action against Peter Kellogg alleging that he directed fraudulent wash trades and matched trades between four accounts he controlled" during August 2001. Wash sales are trades of securities without a real change in ownership of the securities traded. Matched orders are orders to buy or sell securities that are entered with knowledge that a matching order on the opposite side has been or will be entered.

The NASD subsequently announced on August 6, 2004, that a panel convened to hear the case had dismissed the complaint against Kellogg. The public notice stated that "The Hearing Panel found that there was no evidence that Kellogg carried out the four transactions at issue with the intention to defraud, manipulate or deceive. Rather, the panel found that Kellogg conducted the transactions for legitimate business and tax purposes." Kellogg's history of philanthropy was factored into the decision.

== AMEX ==
Spear, Leeds was fined $1 million in 2002 by the AMEX and ordered to conduct a review of the supervision of its clearance and specialist operations on the AMEX floor. This came in the wake of a violation of AMEX trading rules in the mid-1990s by a Spear Leeds employee whom the AMEX found had not been properly supervised by the firm. The employee, who was fined $100,000 and barred from the industry, was reported in the news media to have testified that his actions were known to senior Spear Leeds officials, including Kellogg.

== Taxes ==
Kellogg is the controlling shareholder of IAT Reinsurance Co., which has received media attention for its having used a U.S. law exempting small insurance companies from paying federal tax if they collected fewer than $350,000 in annual premiums.

Kellogg and his wife, through their charitable foundation, bought the John F. Peto Studio Museum in Island Heights, NJ in 2005 to save it from demolition. The foundation spent approximately $2,000,000 on renovations. The Foundation relinquished ownership of the museum in 2021–2022 to the Board of the Museum. It now sustains itself off of memberships, donations, and fundraisers.
