= Shingle style architecture =

American architectural style

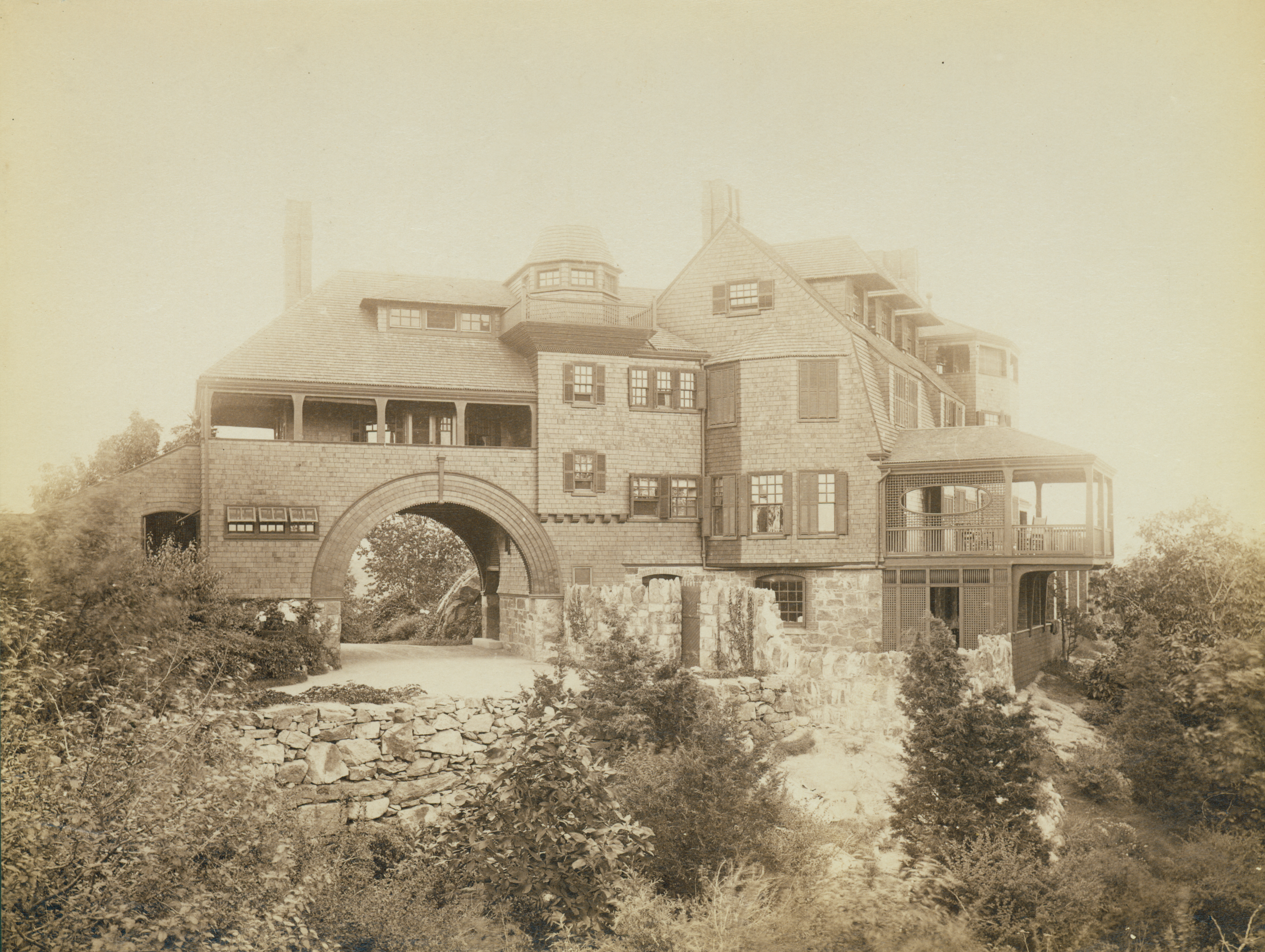
"Kragsyde," Manchester-by-the-Sea, Massachusetts (1883–1885, demolished 1929), Peabody and Stearns, architects

The shingle style is an American architectural style made popular by the rise of the New England school of architecture, which eschewed the highly ornamented patterns of the Eastlake style in Queen Anne architecture. In the shingle style, English influence was combined with the renewed interest in Colonial American architecture which followed the 1876 celebration of the Centennial. The plain, shingled surfaces of colonial buildings were adopted, and their massing emulated.

Aside from being a style of design, the style also conveyed a sense of the house as continuous volume. This effect—of the building as an envelope of space, rather than a great mass, was enhanced by the visual tautness of the flat shingled surfaces, the horizontal shape of many shingle style houses, and the emphasis on horizontal continuity, both in exterior details and in the flow of spaces within the houses.

== History ==
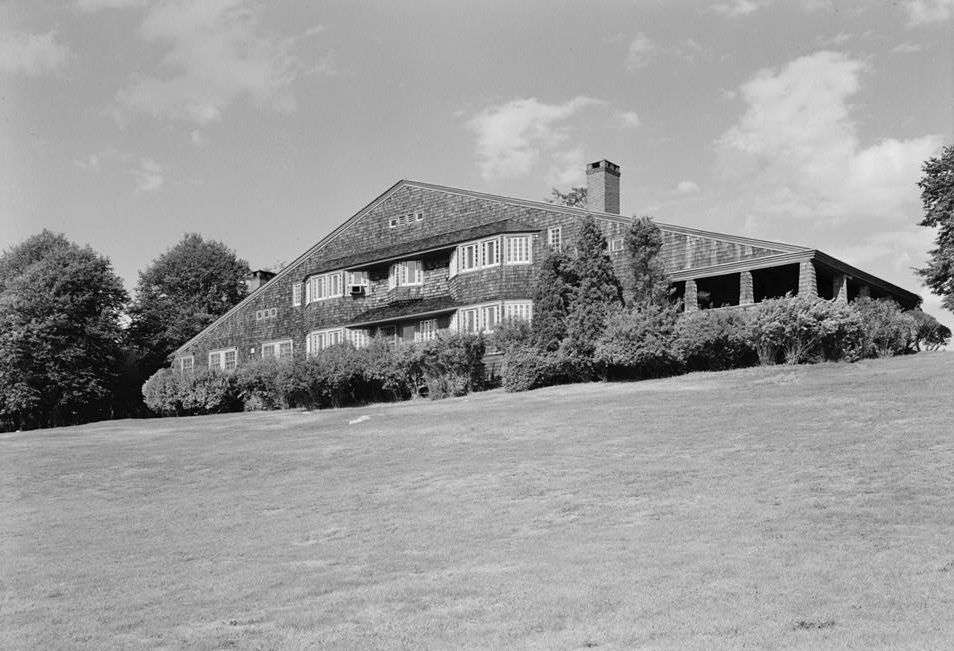
William G. Low House, Bristol, Rhode Island (1886–87, demolished 1962), McKim, Mead & White, architects. Now an icon of American architecture, the Low House was relatively obscure at the time of its 1962 demolition.

McKim, Mead and White and Peabody and Stearns were two of the notable firms of the era that helped to popularize the shingle style, through their large-scale commissions for "seaside cottages" of the rich and the prosperous in such places as Newport, Rhode Island and the village of East Hampton on the southeastern tip of Long Island. Perhaps the most famous shingle style house built in America was "Kragsyde" (1882) the summer home commissioned by Bostonian G. Nixon Black, from Peabody and Stearns. Kragsyde was built atop the rocky coastal shore near Manchester-by-the-Sea, Massachusetts, and embodied every possible tenet of the shingle style. The William G. Low House, designed by McKim, Mead & White and built in 1887, is another notable example.

Many of the concepts of the Shingle style were adopted by Gustav Stickley, and adapted to the American version of the Arts and Crafts Movement. Additionally, there are several other notable styles of Victorian architecture, including Italianate, Second Empire, Folk and Gothic Revival.

Some concentrations of shingle style architecture are listed in the U.S. National Register of Historic Places. Significant listed historic districts include:

- Bay Head Historic District in Bay Head, New Jersey, with several dozen shingle houses
- Houses in Sycamore Historic District, in Sycamore, Illinois
- Fenwick Historic District, perhaps Connecticut's largest concentration, with 17
- Montauk Association Historic District, on Long Island
- Houses in the Glen Ridge Historic District of Glen Ridge, New Jersey

The style was named, together with the Stick Style, by Yale University architectural historian Vincent Scully in his 1949 doctoral dissertation The Cottage Style. This was followed by several magazine articles on the subject, culminating in Scully's The Shingle Style with the Stick Style in 1971 and The Shingle Style Today in 1974.

== Characteristics ==
Architects of the shingle style emulated colonial houses' plain, shingled surfaces as well as their massing, whether in the single exaggerated gable of McKim Mead and White's Low House or in the complex massing of Kragsyde. This impression of the passage of time is enhanced by the use of shingles. Some architects, in order to attain a weathered look on a new building, had the cedar shakes dipped in buttermilk, dried and then installed, to leave a grayish tinge to the façade.

Shingle style houses often use a gambrel or hip roof. Such houses thus emanate a more pronounced mass and a greater emphasis on horizontality.

== Shingle style overseas ==
The shingle style eventually spread beyond North America. In Australia, it was introduced by the Canadian architect John Horbury Hunt in the nineteenth century. Some of his shingle style homes still survive and are heritage-listed. Some of his most notable examples of the style are Highlands, a home in the Sydney suburb of Wahroonga, and Pibrac, in the nearby suburb of Warrawee. The latter house has been featured in a television commercial. Gatehouse, also in Wahroonga, was not one of Hunt's designs, but is heritage-listed.

== Examples of the shingle style ==
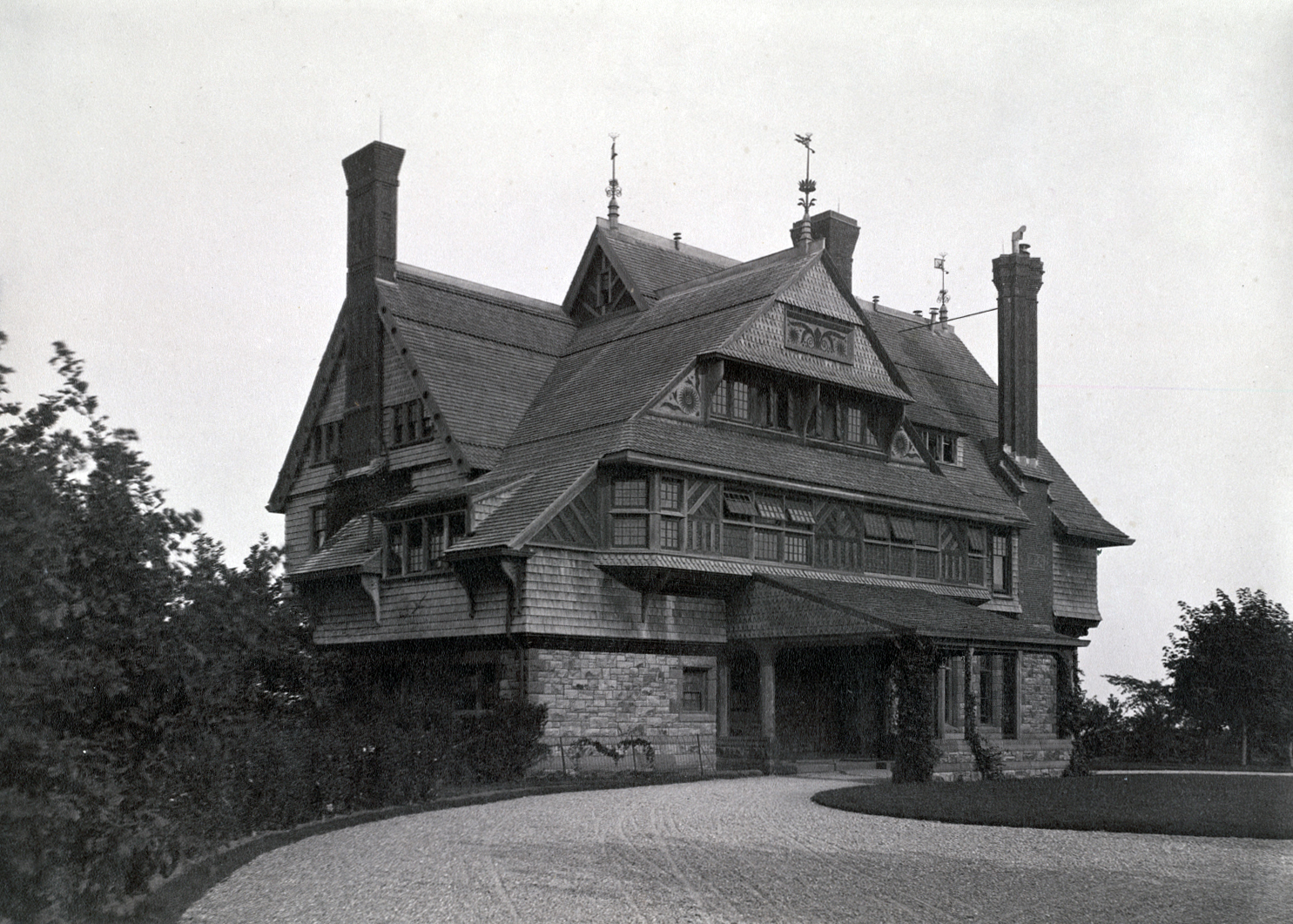
William Watts Sherman House, Newport, Rhode Island (1875–76), Henry Hobson Richardson, architect

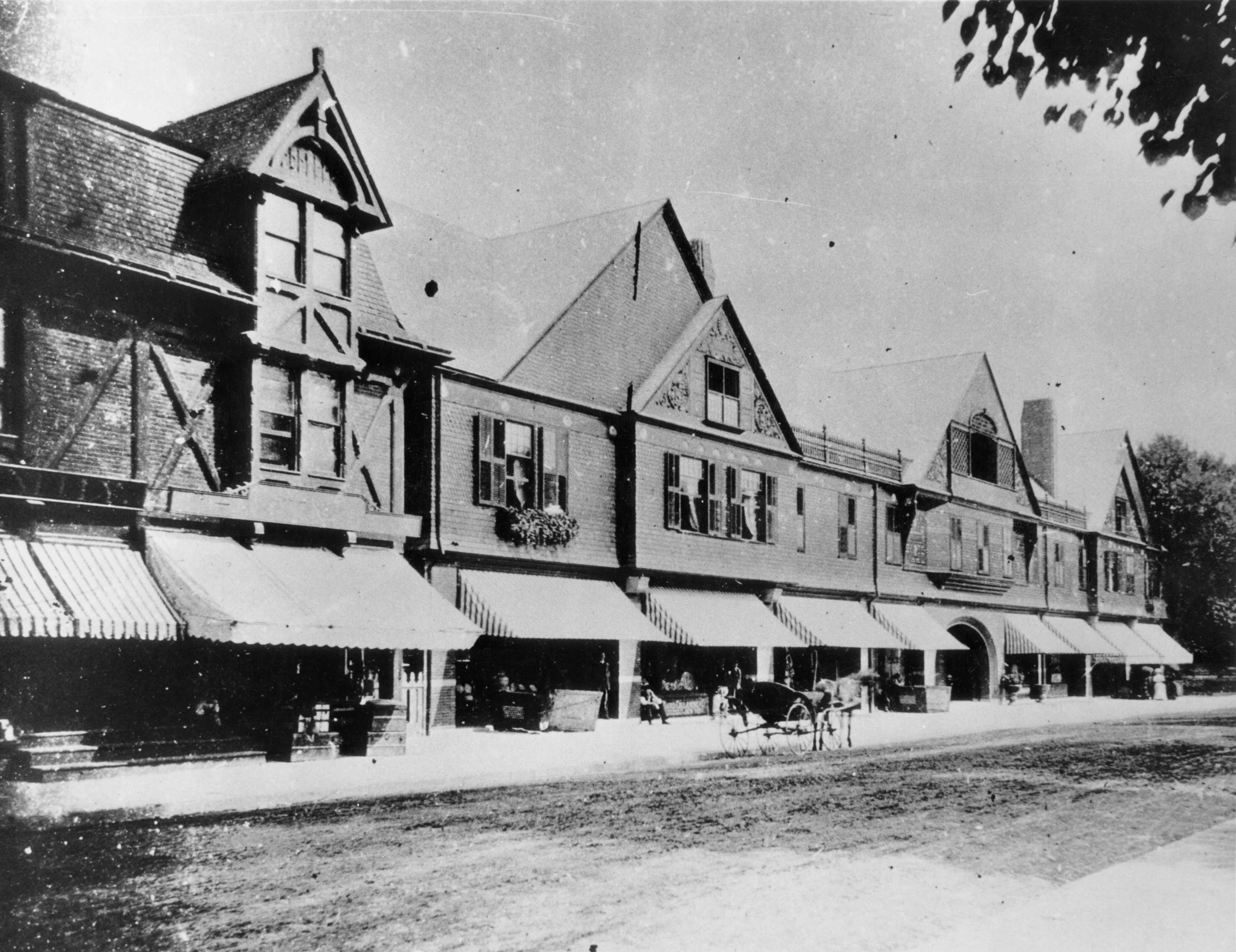
Newport Casino, Newport, Rhode Island (1879), McKim, Mead & White, architects

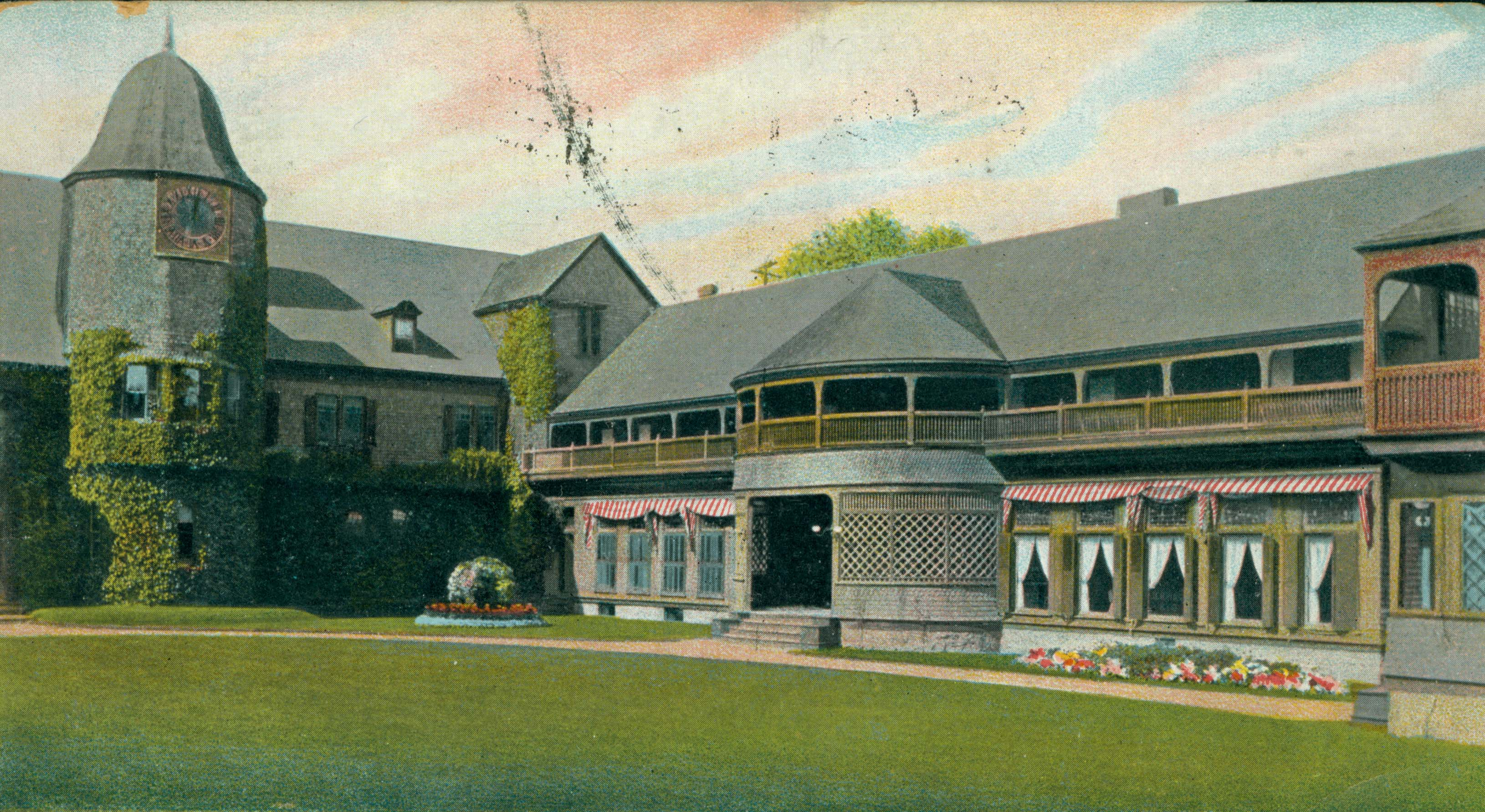
Horseshoe Courtyard, Newport Casino, Newport, Rhode Island (1879), McKim, Mead & White, architects. Circa 1900 postcard.

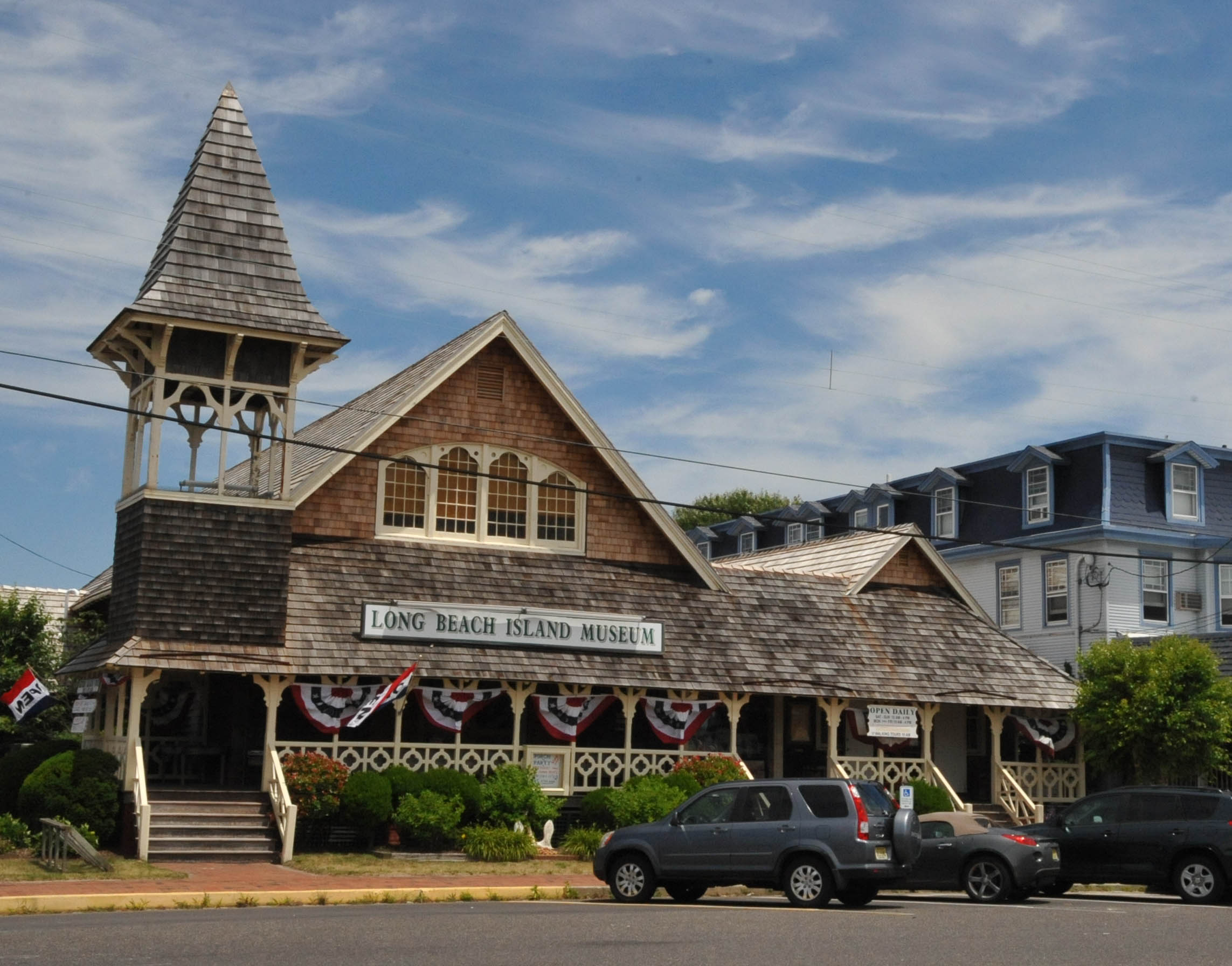
Holy Innocents Episcopal Church, Beach Haven, New Jersey (1881–82), Wilson Brothers & Company, architects

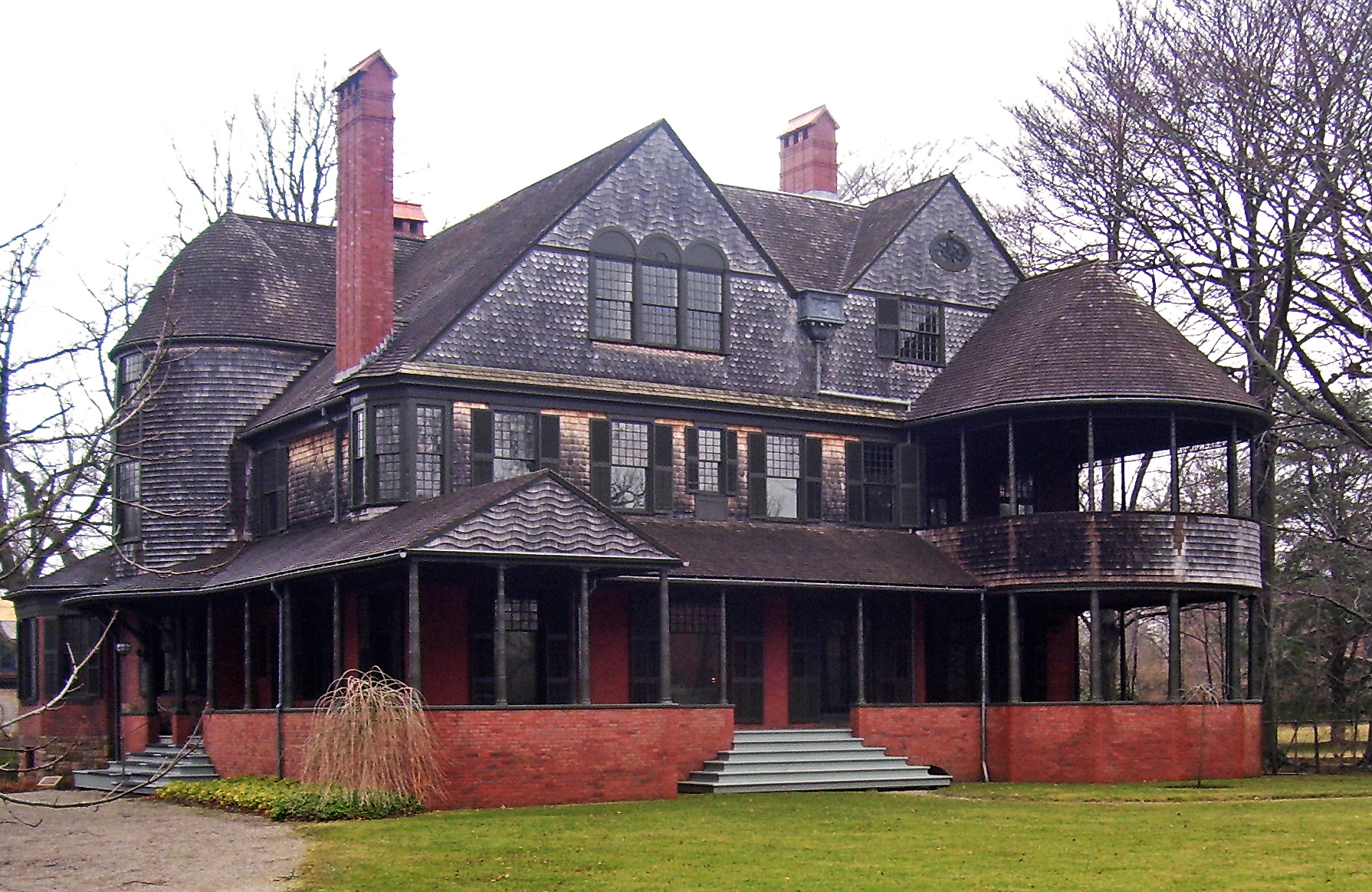
Isaac Bell House, Newport, Rhode Island (1882), McKim, Mead & White, architects

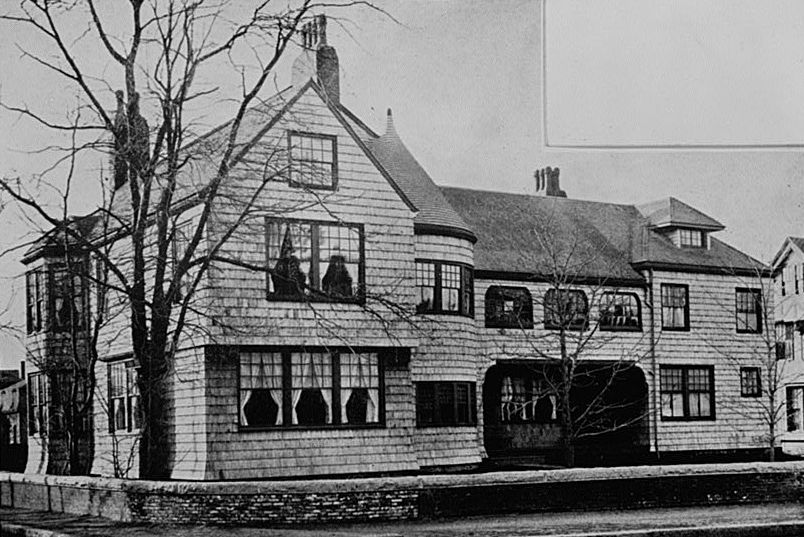
Mary Fiske Stoughton House, Cambridge, Massachusetts (1882–83), Henry Hobson Richardson, architect

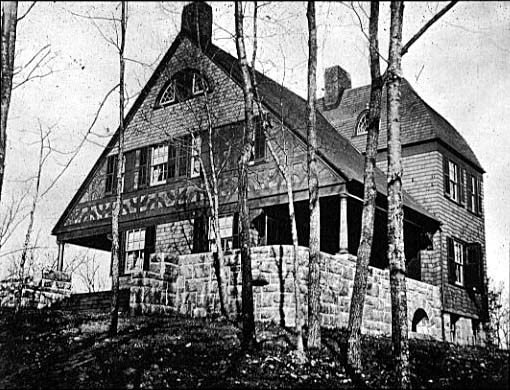
William Kent Cottage, Tuxedo Park, New York (1886, demolished), Bruce Price, architect

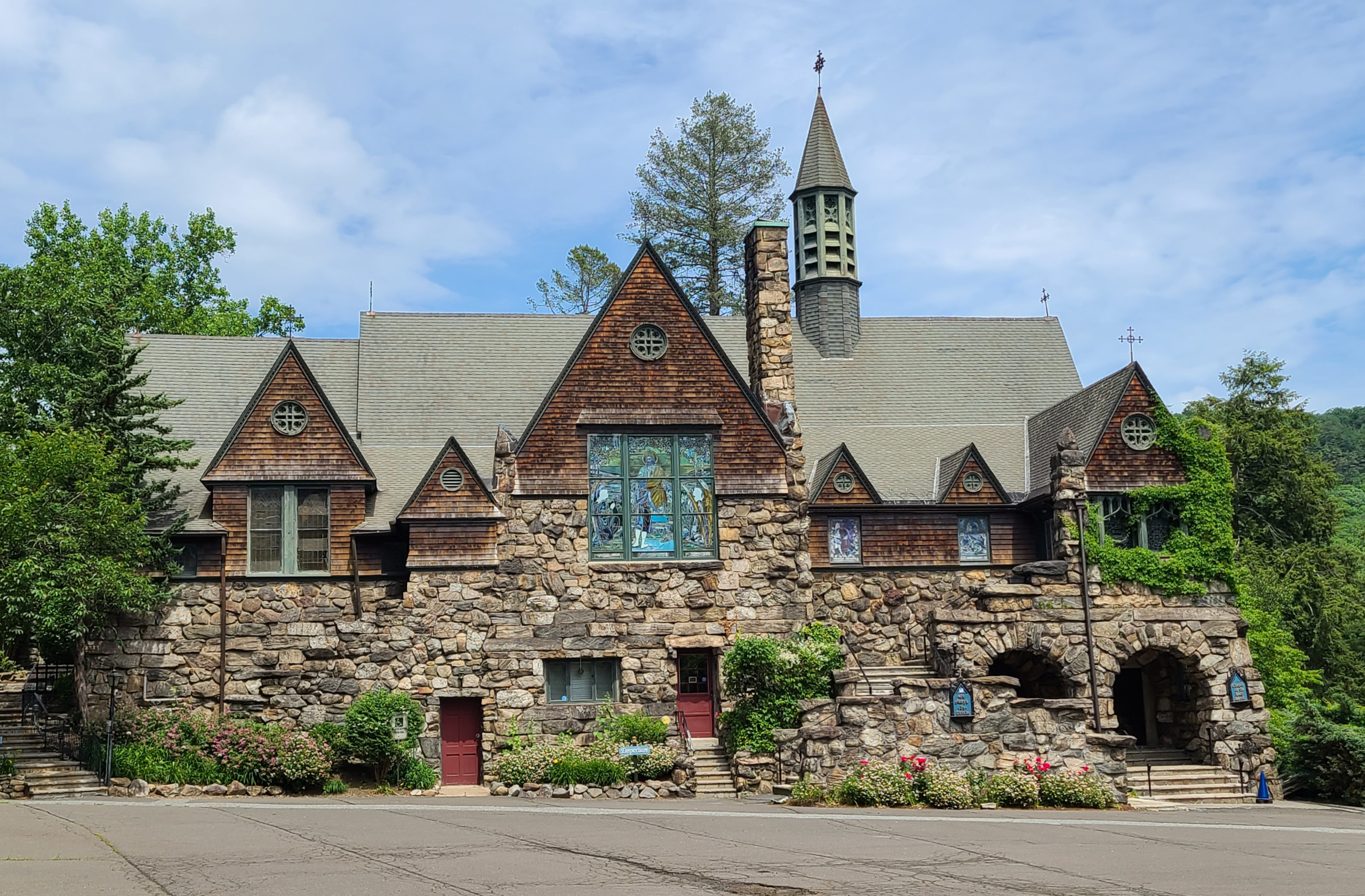
St. Mary's-in-Tuxedo Episcopal Church, Tuxedo Park, New York (1888), William Appleton Potter, architect

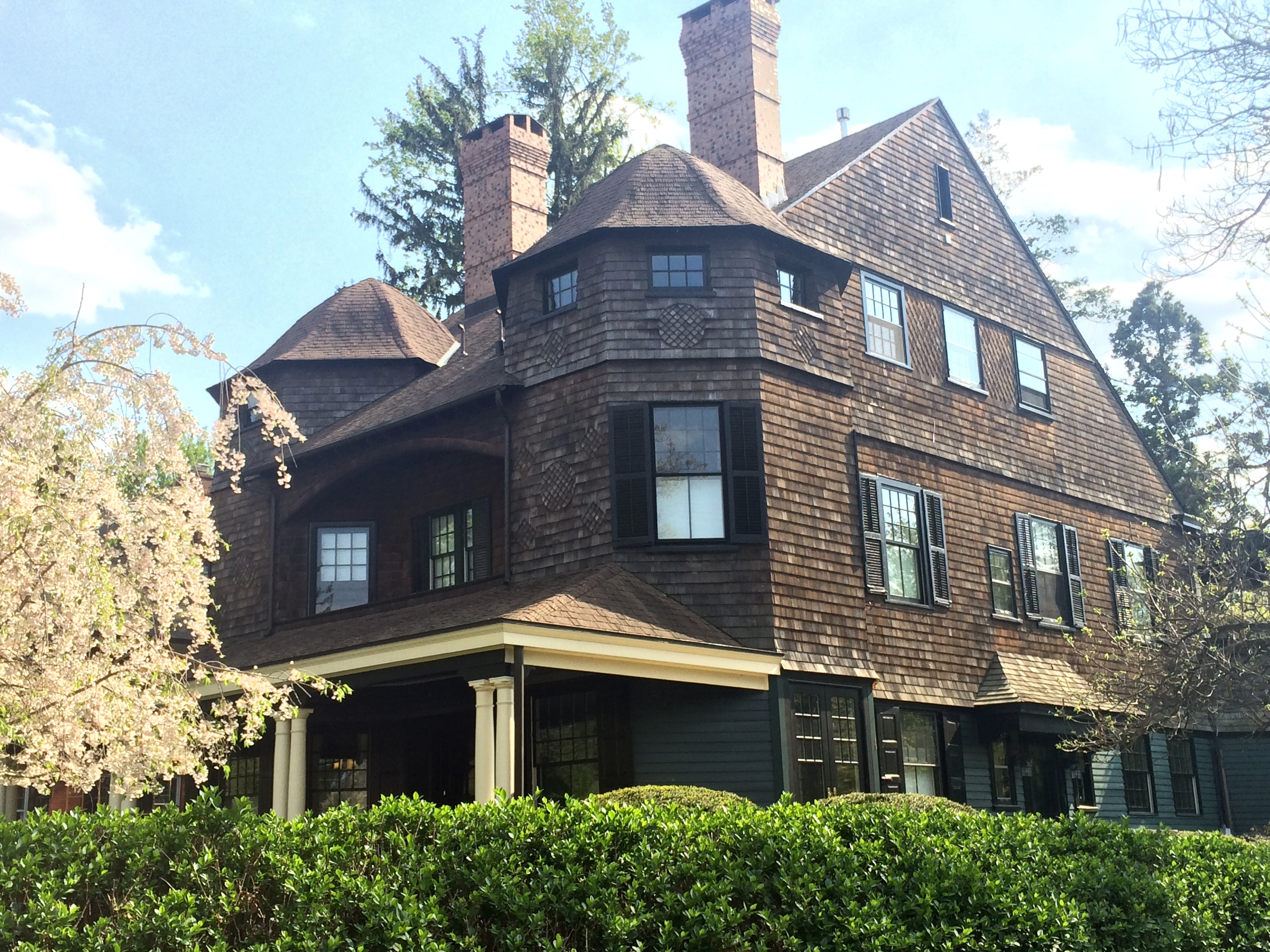
The William Berryman Scott House (1888), designed by A. Page Brown, at 56 Bayard Lane, Princeton, New Jersey in the Princeton Historic District

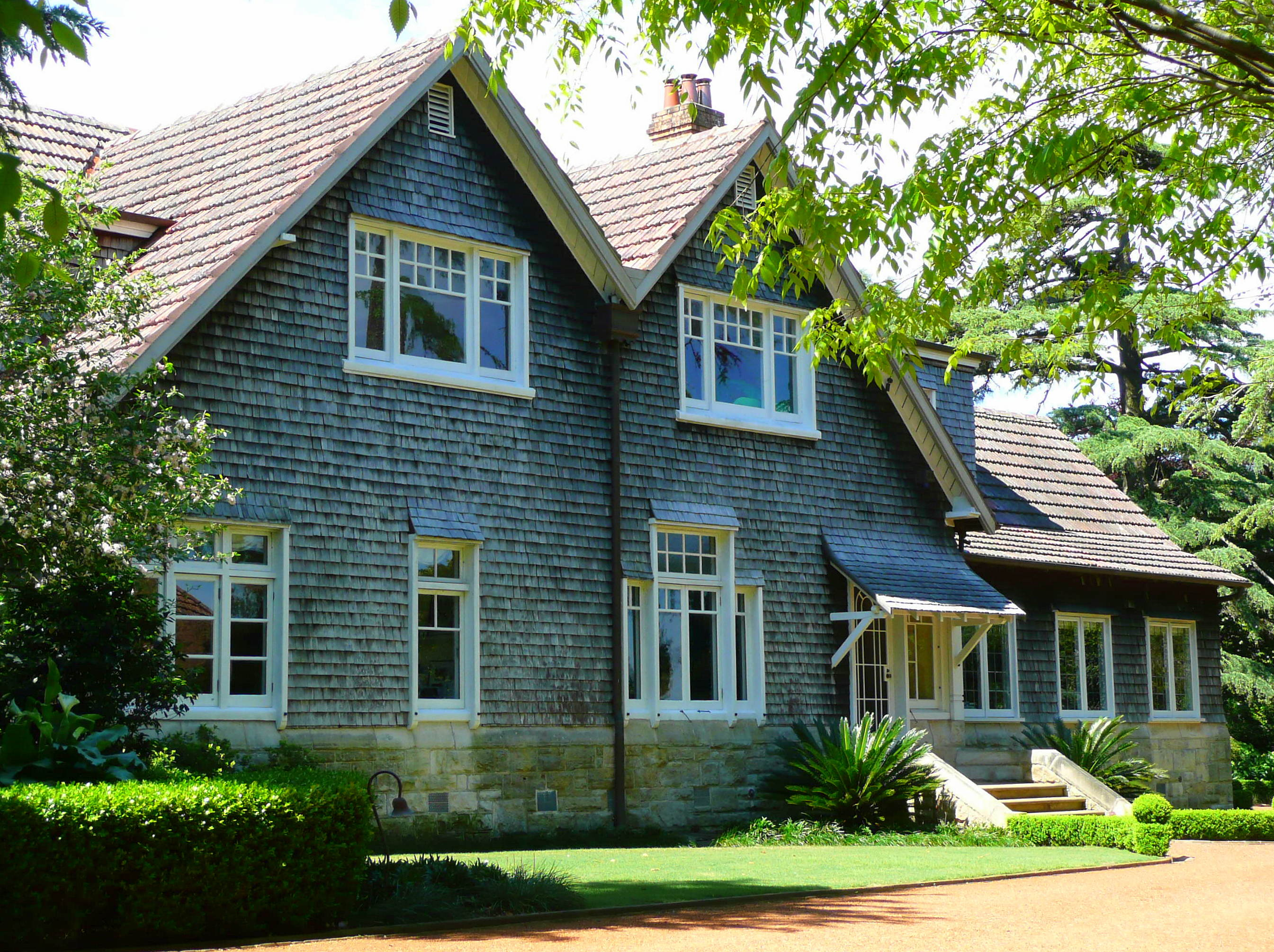
Pibrac (1888), Sydney, Australia, John Horbury Hunt, architect

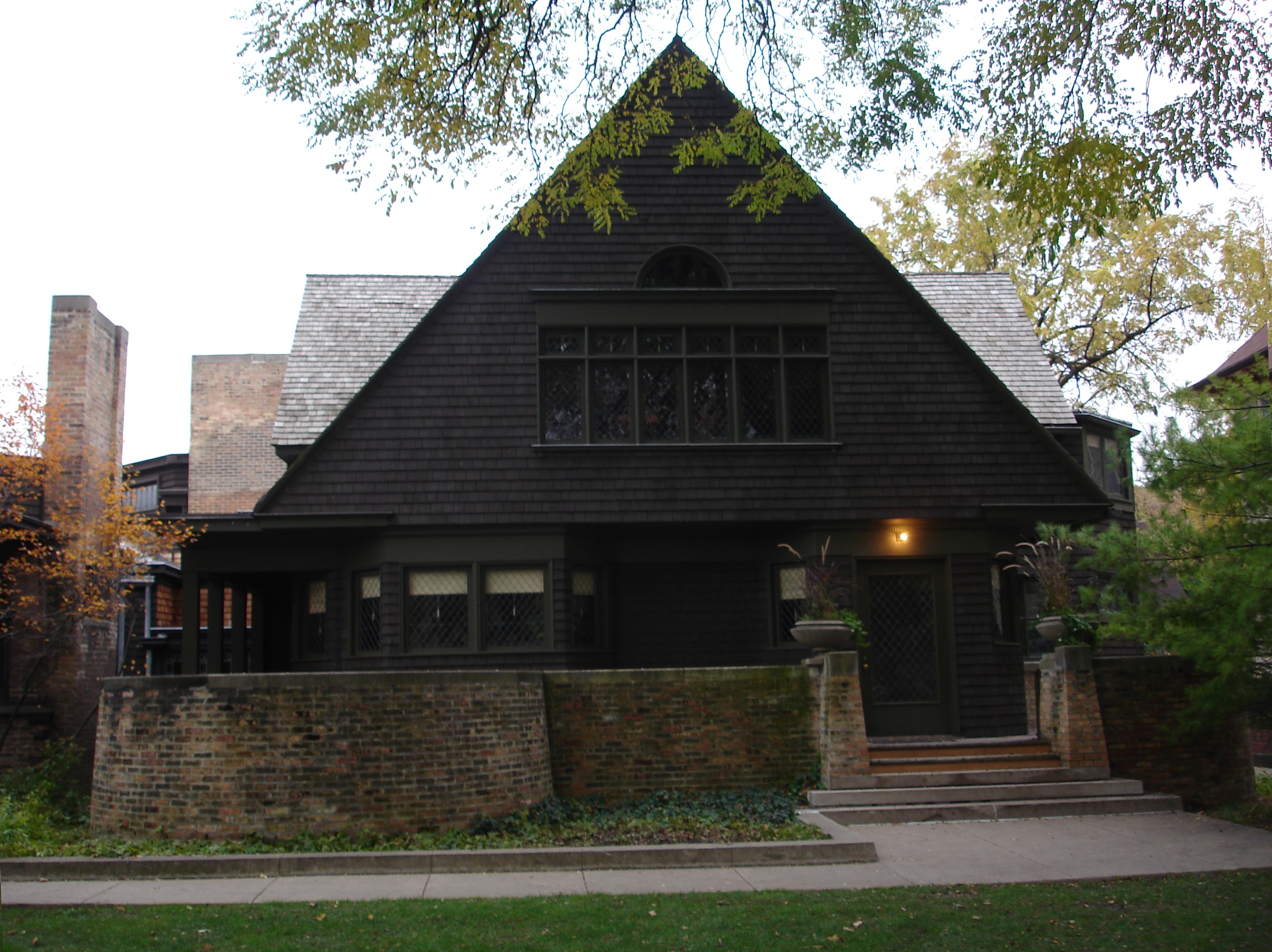
Frank Lloyd Wright House and Studio, Oak Park, Chicago, Illinois (1889), Frank Lloyd Wright, architect

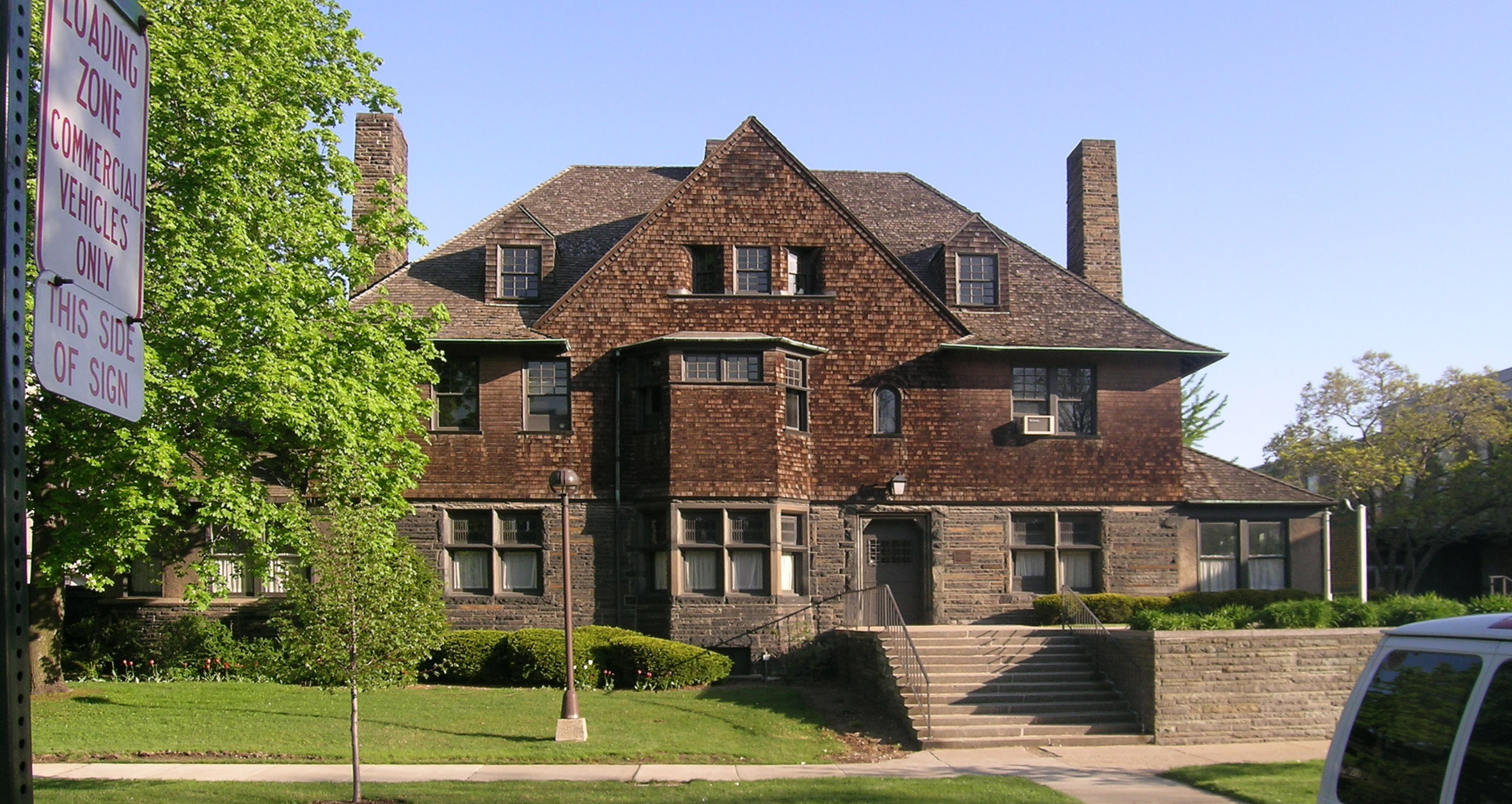
Charles Lang Freer House, Detroit, Michigan (1890), Wilson Eyre, architect

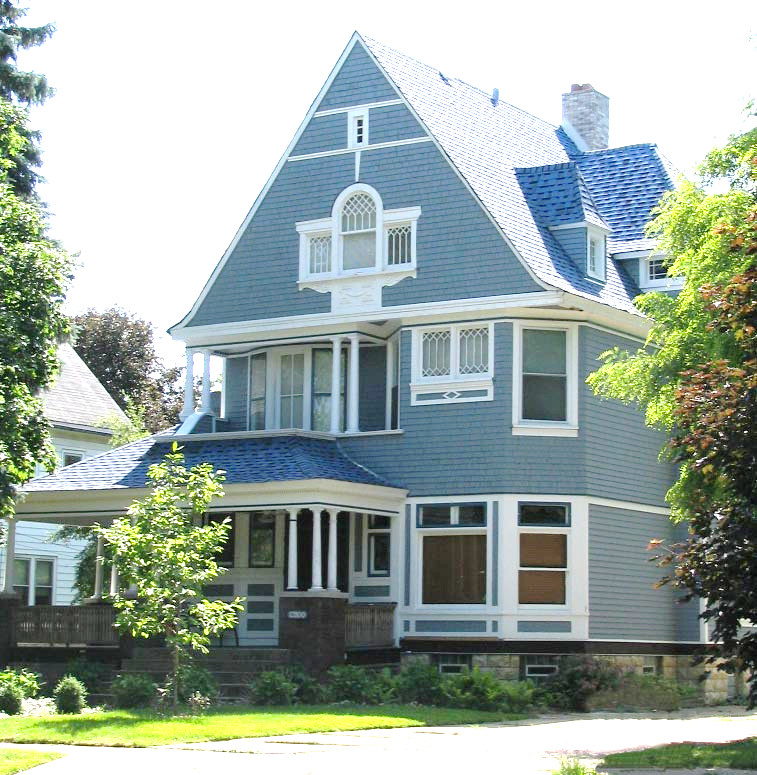
Harry and Stella Massey house, Blue Island, IL (1890) August Fiedler, architect

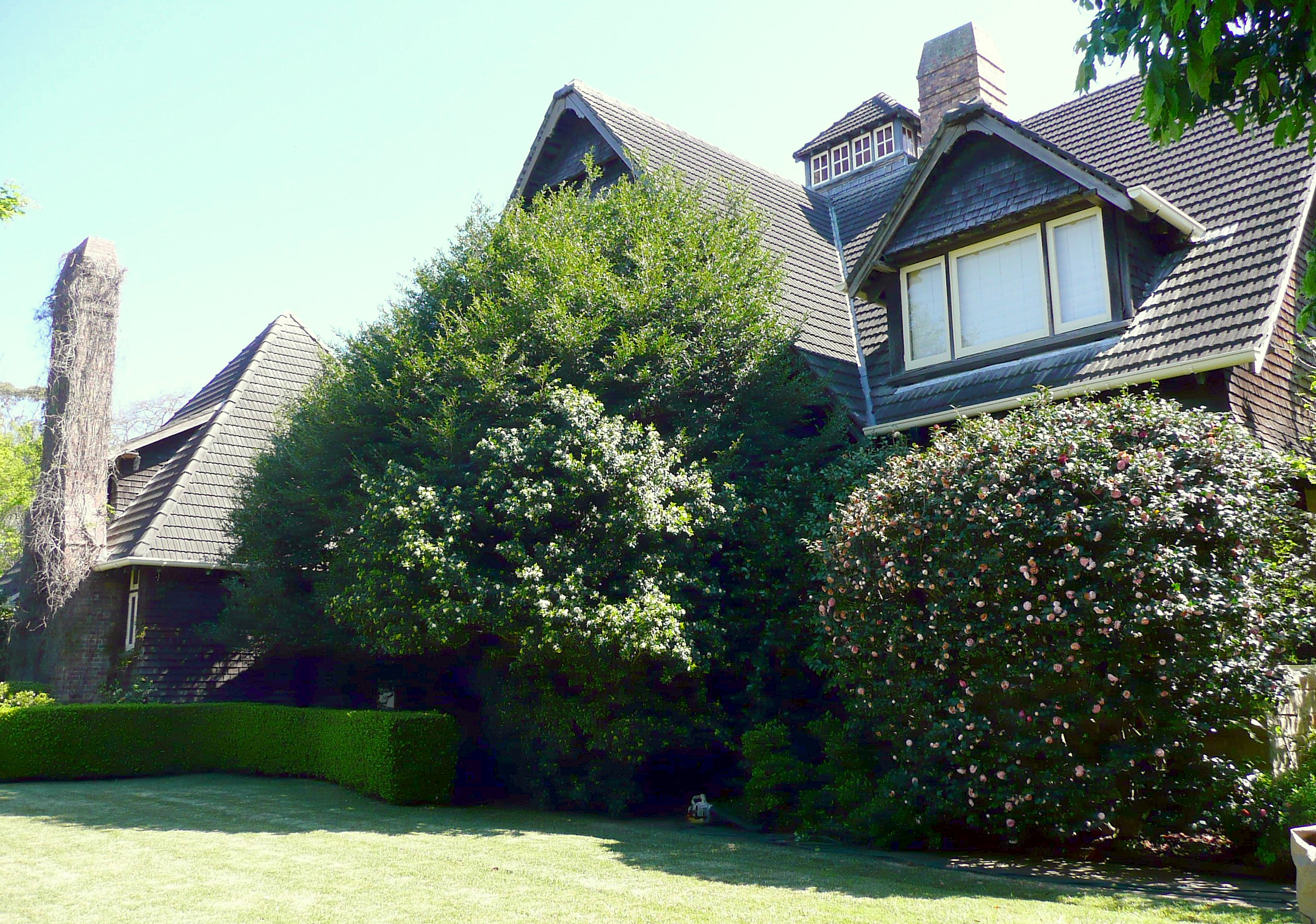
Highlands (1891), Sydney, Australia, John Horbury Hunt, architect

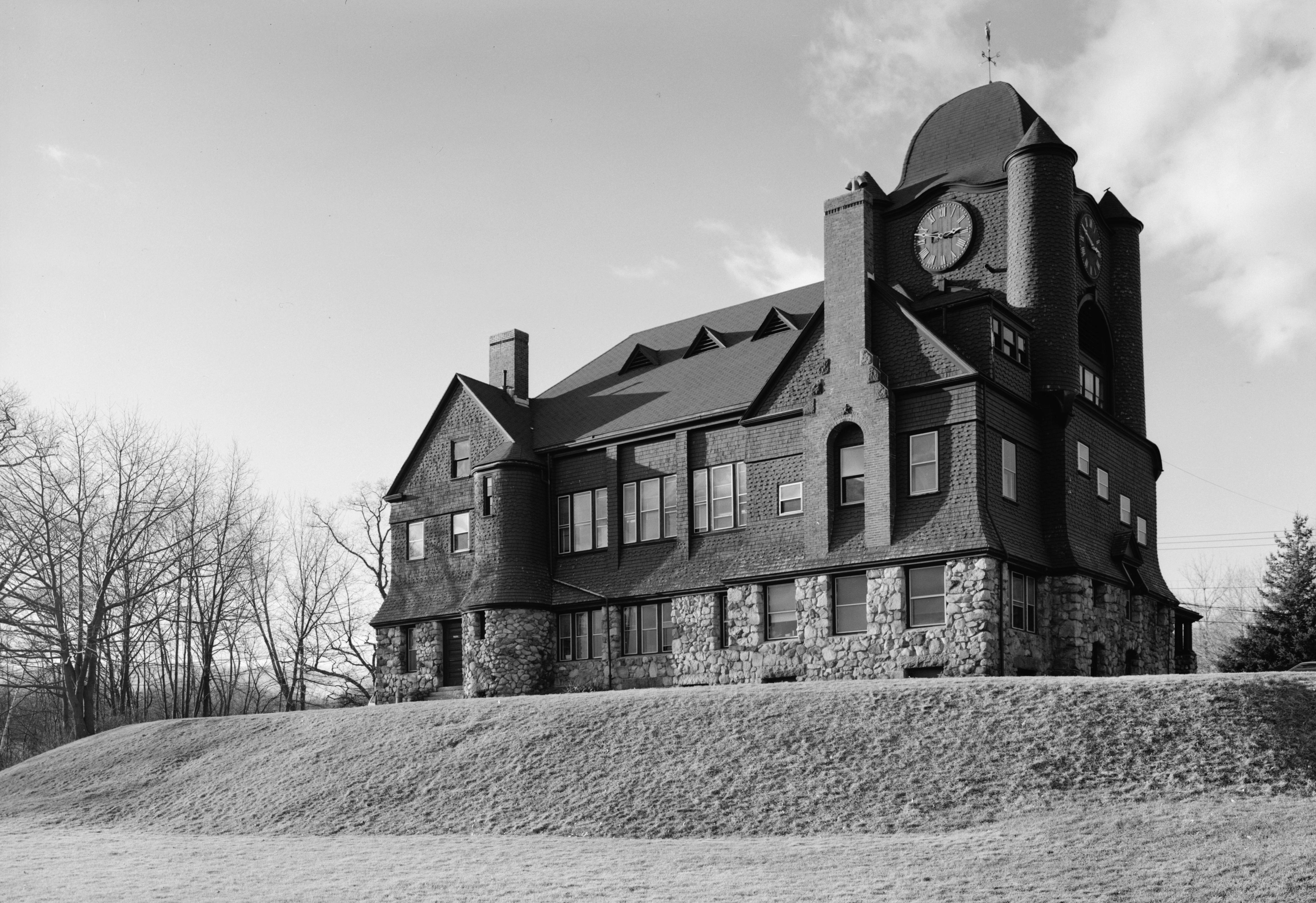
Essex Town Hall and TOHP Burnham Library, Essex, Massachusetts (1893–94), Frank W. Weston, architect

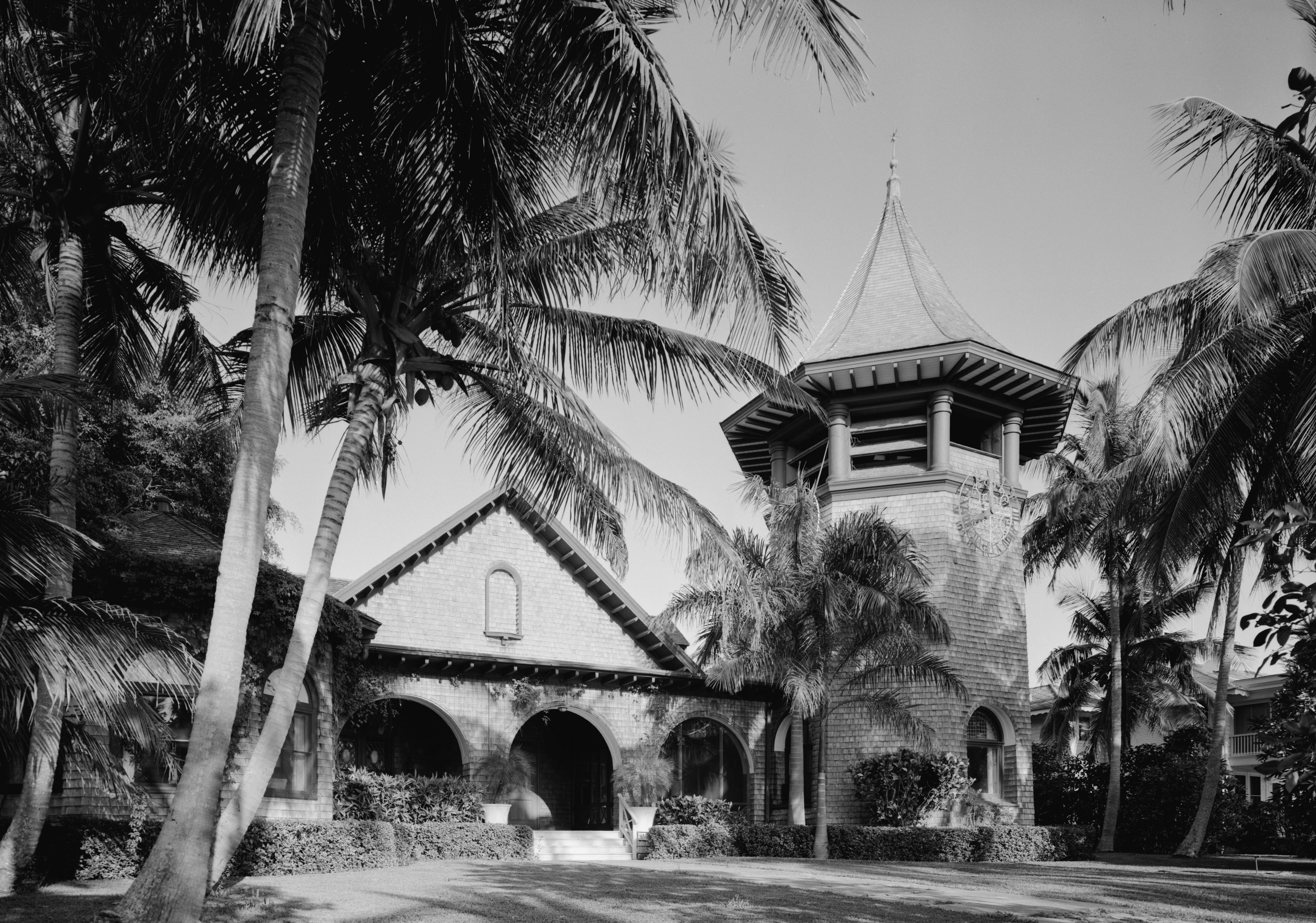
Bethesda-by-the-Sea Episcopal Church, Palm Beach, Florida (1895), John H. Lee, architect

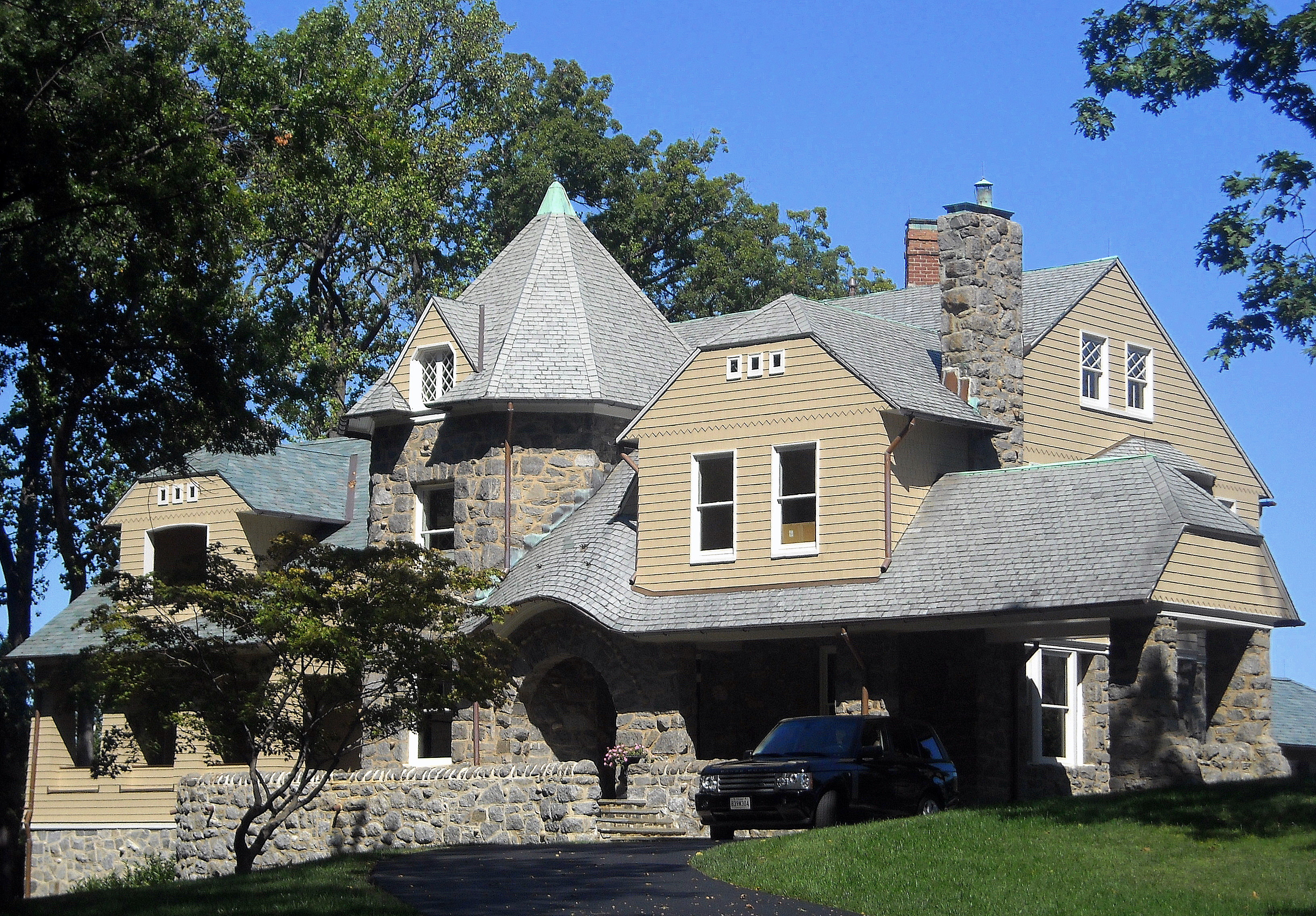
Owl's Nest (aka Crounse House), Washington, D.C. (1897), Appleton P. Clark Jr., architect

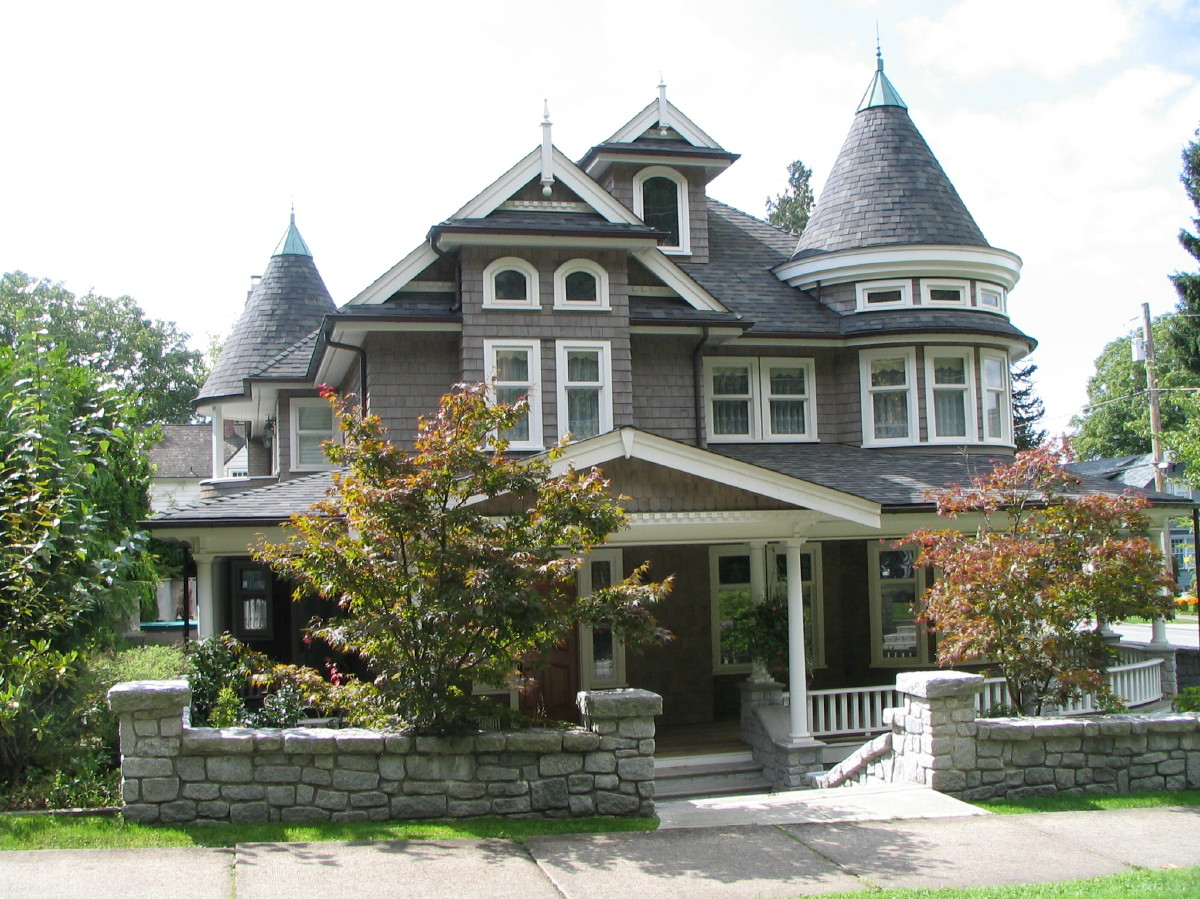
Modern replica of a shingle-style house (c. 2004), opposite Queen's Park, New Westminster, British Columbia

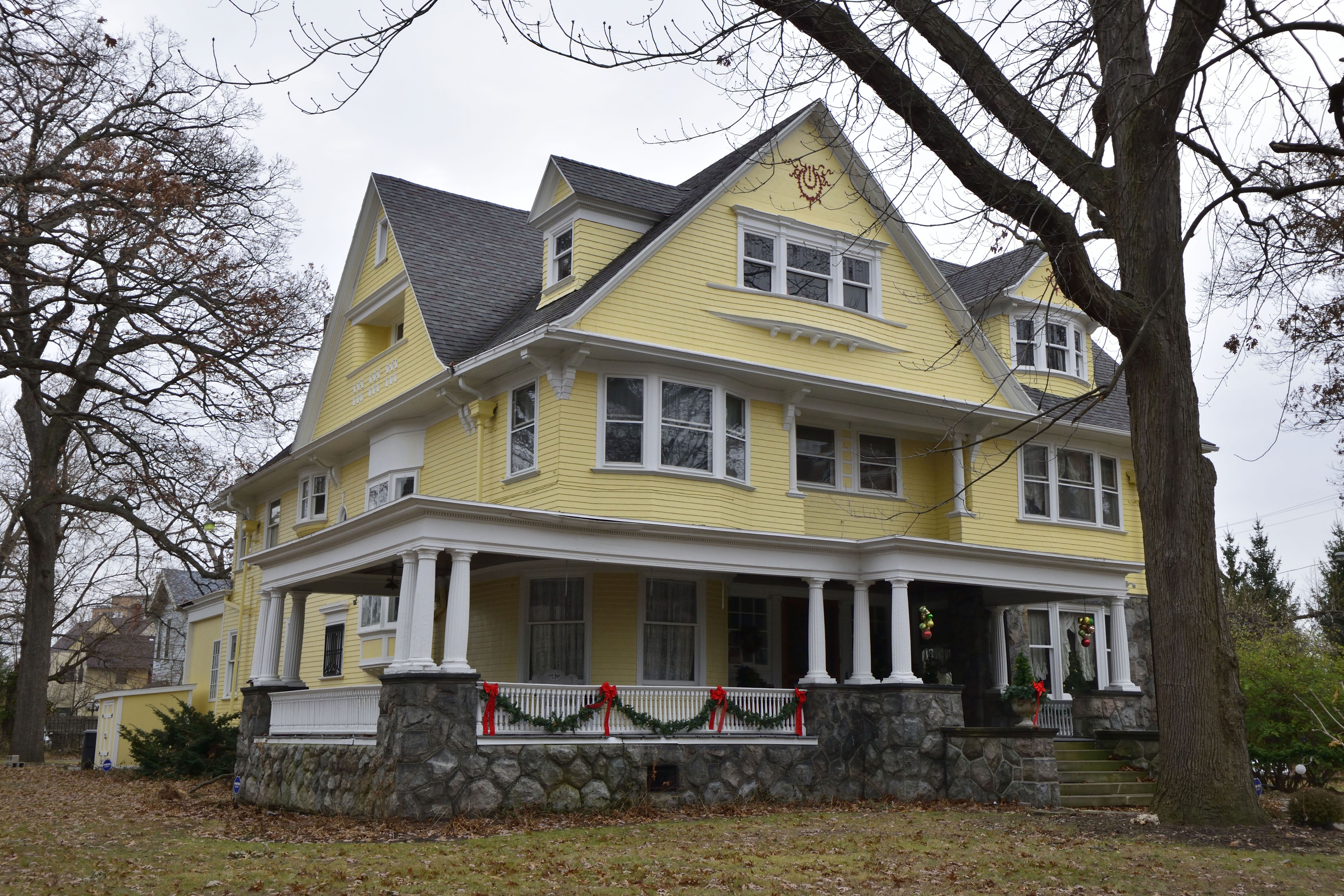
Edward D. Libbey House in Toledo, Ohio an example of Shingle Style with Colonial Revival architectural elements, 2018

== See also ==
- List of architectural styles
- Queen Anne style architecture in the United States
- Victorian architecture
