= Queen Anne style architecture in the United States =

Architectural style during Victorian Era

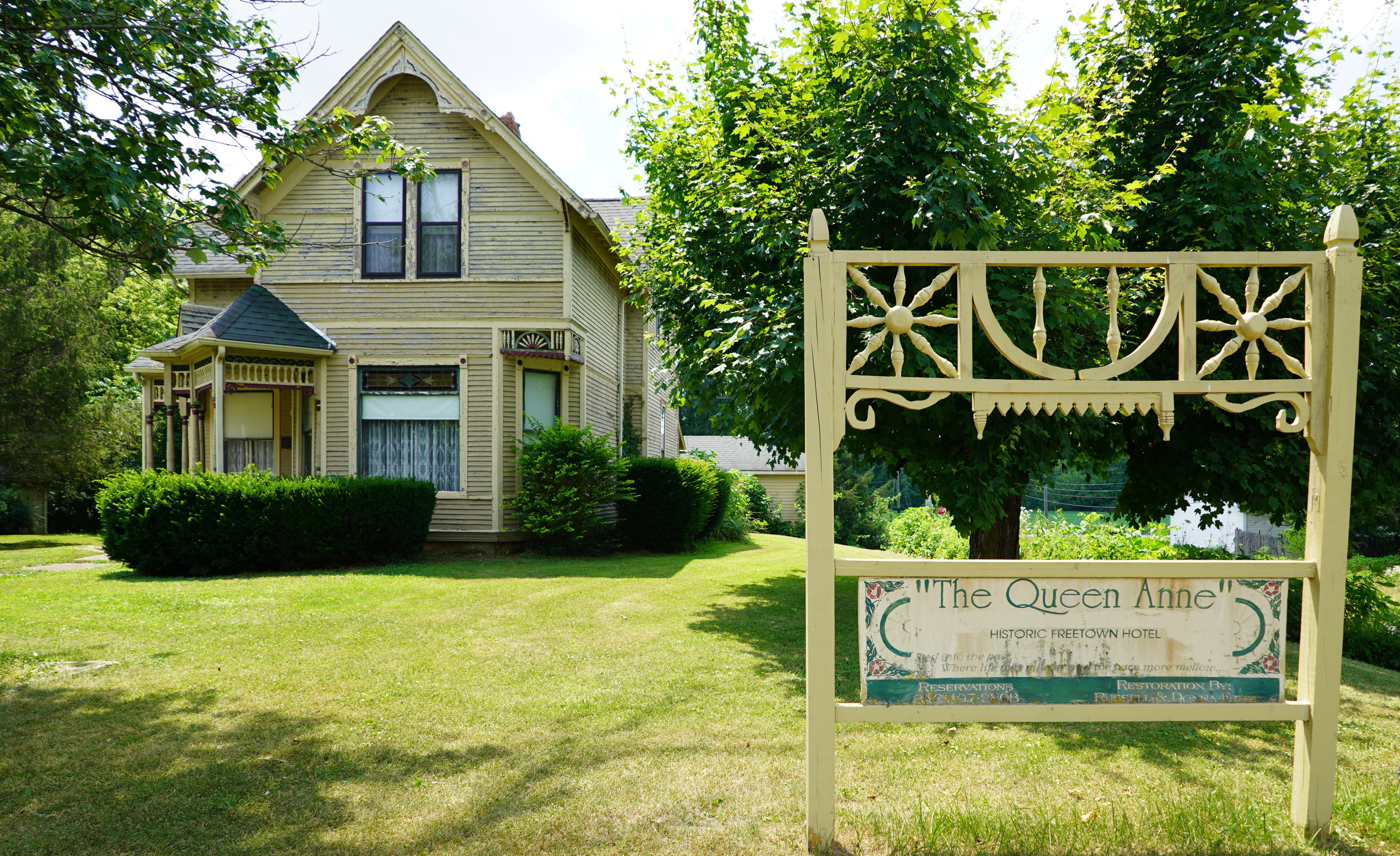
Queen Anne style Frank Wheeler Hotel in Freetown, Indiana

Queen Anne style architecture was one of a number of popular Victorian architectural styles that emerged in the United States during the period from roughly 1880 to 1910. It is sometimes grouped as New World Queen Anne Revival architecture. Popular there during this time, it followed the Second Empire and Stick styles and preceded the Richardsonian Romanesque and Shingle styles. Sub-movements of Queen Anne include the Eastlake movement.

The style bears almost no relationship to the original Queen Anne style architecture in Britain (a toned-down version of English Baroque that was used mostly for gentry houses) which appeared during the time of Queen Anne, who reigned from 1702 to 1714, nor of Queen Anne Revival (which appeared in the latter 19th century there).

The American style covers a wide range of picturesque buildings with "free Renaissance" (non-Gothic Revival) details, rather than being a specific formulaic style in its own right.

The term "Queen Anne", as an alternative both to the French-derived Second Empire style and the less "domestic" Beaux-Arts style, is broadly applied to architecture, furniture and decorative arts of the period from 1880 to 1910. Some Queen Anne architectural elements, such as the wrap-around front porch, continued to be found into the 1920s.

== Overview ==
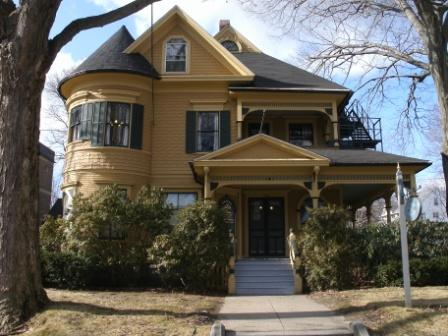
James Alldis House in Torrington, Connecticut, built in 1895

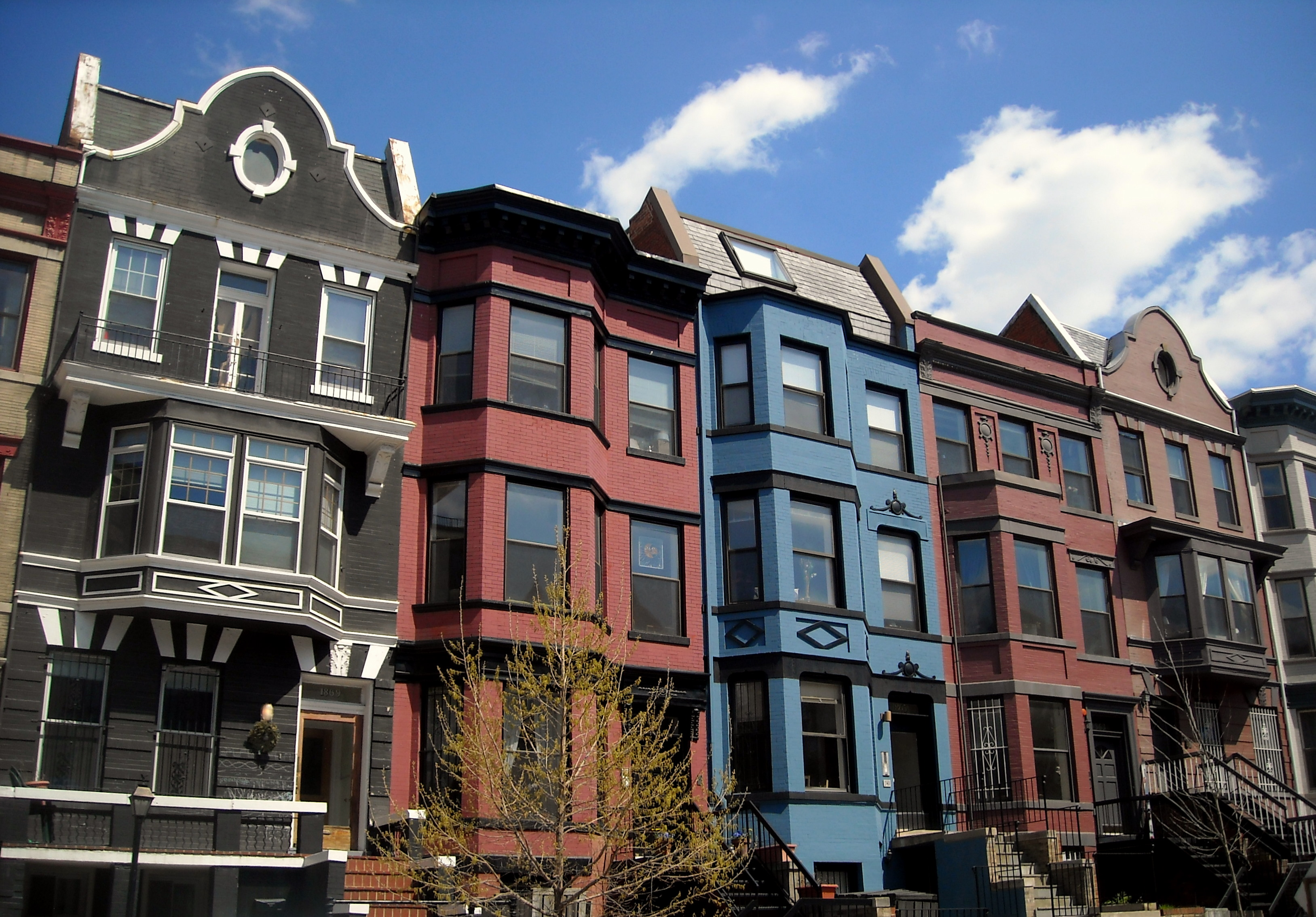
Queen Anne style rowhouses in the Adams Morgan neighborhood of Washington, D.C.

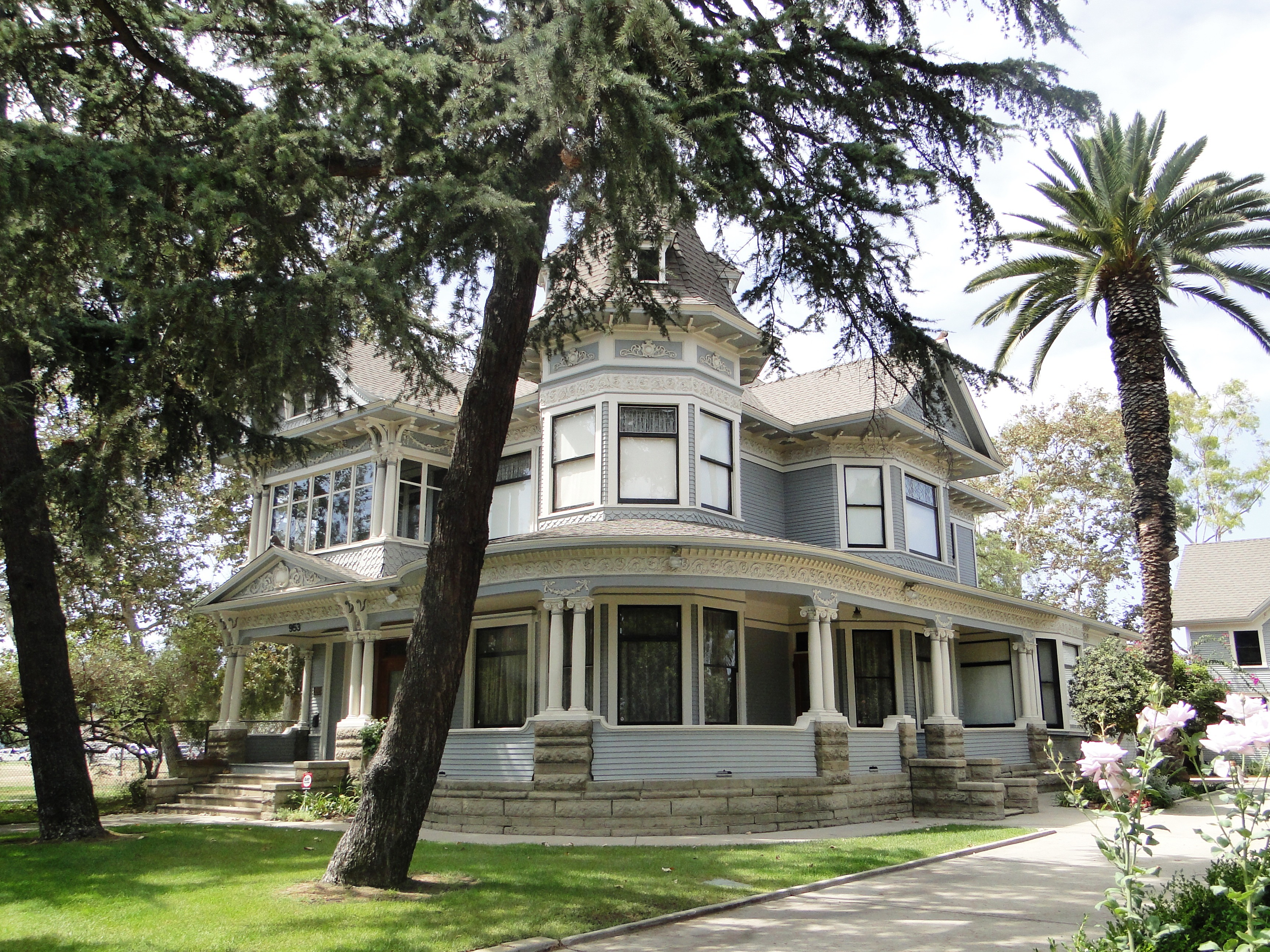
Bembridge House in Long Beach, California, built in 1906

Queen Anne style buildings in the United States came into vogue during the 1880s, replacing the French-derived Second Empire as the 'style of the moment'. The popularity of high Queen Anne style waned in the early 1900s, but some elements continued to be found on buildings into the 1920s, such as the wrap-around front porch (often L-shaped).

Distinctive features of the American Queen Anne style may include:

- asymmetrical façade
- dominant front-facing gable, often cantilevered beyond the plane of the wall below
- overhanging eaves
- round, square, or polygonal towers
- shaped and Dutch gables
- a porch covering part or all of the front façade, including the primary entrance area
- a second-story porch or balconies
- pedimented porches
- differing wall textures, such as patterned wood shingles shaped into varying designs, including resembling fish scales, terra cotta tiles, relief panels, or wooden shingles over brickwork, etc.
- dentils
- classical columns
- spindle work
- oriel and bay windows
- horizontal bands of leaded windows
- monumental chimneys
- painted balustrades
- usually 2-4 story
- wooden or slate roofs
- front gardens with wooden fences

== Examples ==
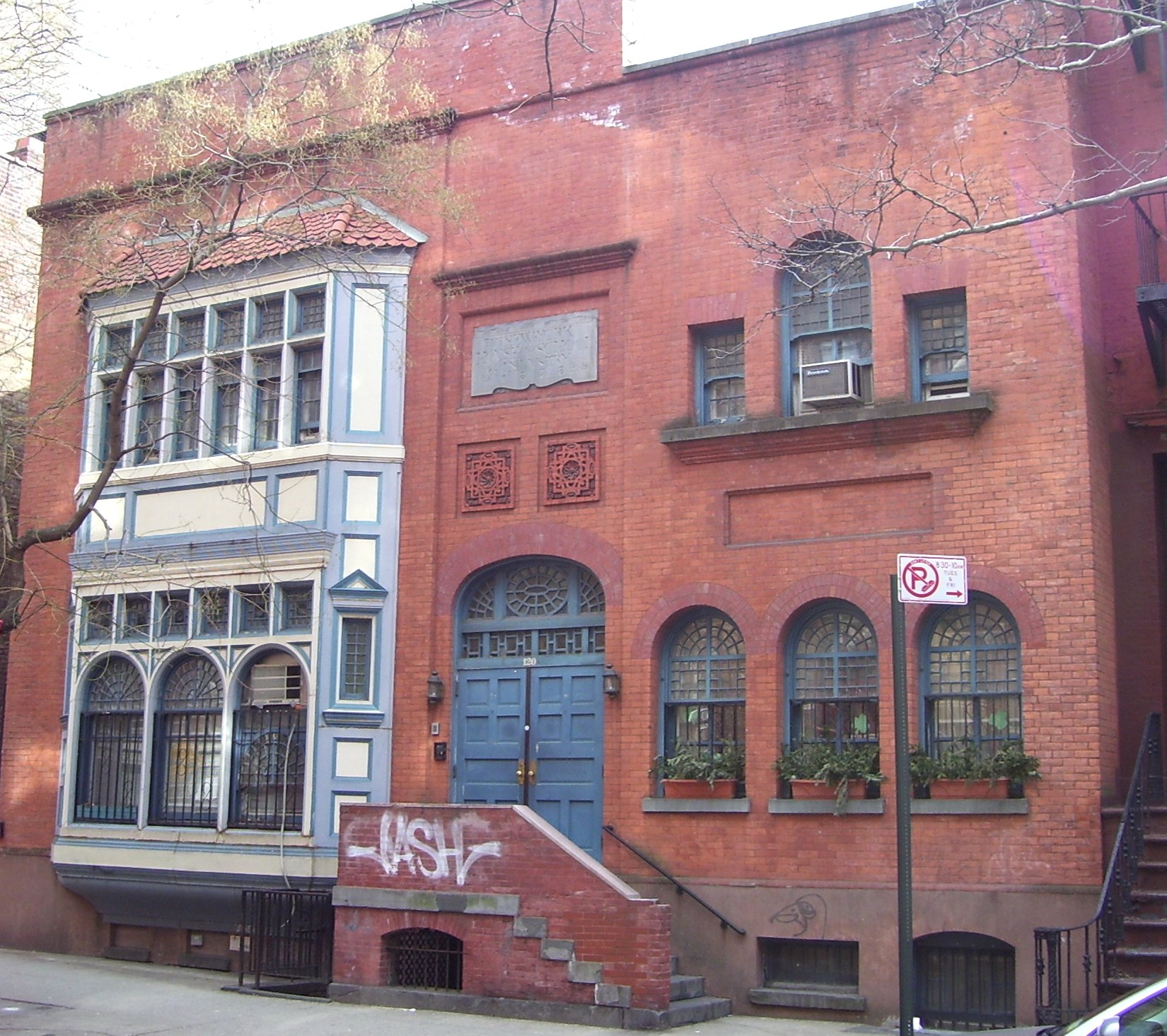
The former House and School of Industry at 120 West 16th Street in New York City

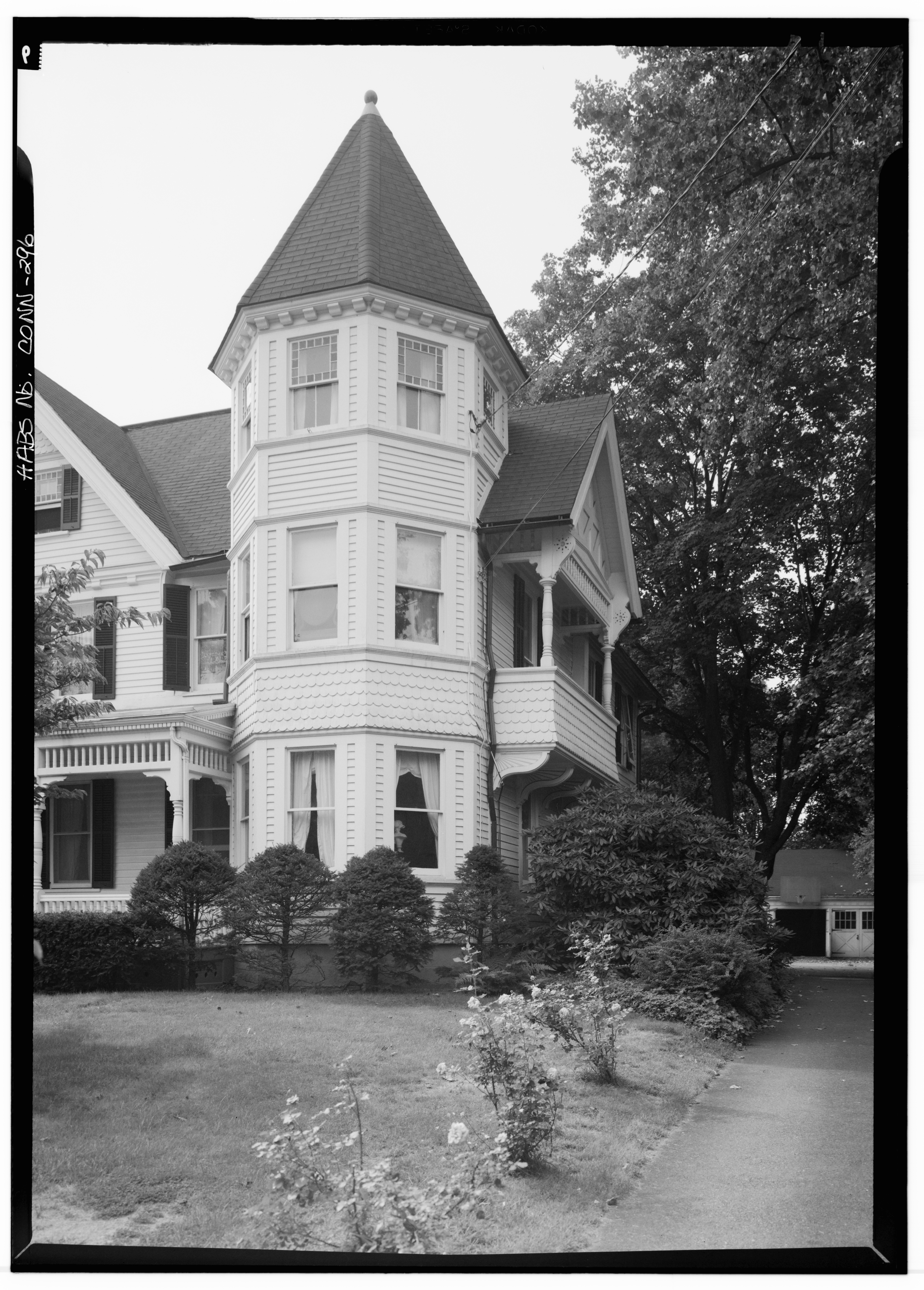
Simon C. Sherwood House (1884), Southport, Connecticut

The British 19th-century Queen Anne style that had been formulated there by Norman Shaw and other architects arrived in New York City with the new housing for the New York House and School of Industry at 120 West 16th Street (designed by Sidney V. Stratton, 1878). The Astral Apartments that were built in Brooklyn in 1885–1886 (to house workers) are an example of red-brick and terracotta Queen Anne architecture in New York. E. Francis Baldwin's stations for the Baltimore and Ohio Railroad are also familiar examples of the style, built variously of brick and wood.

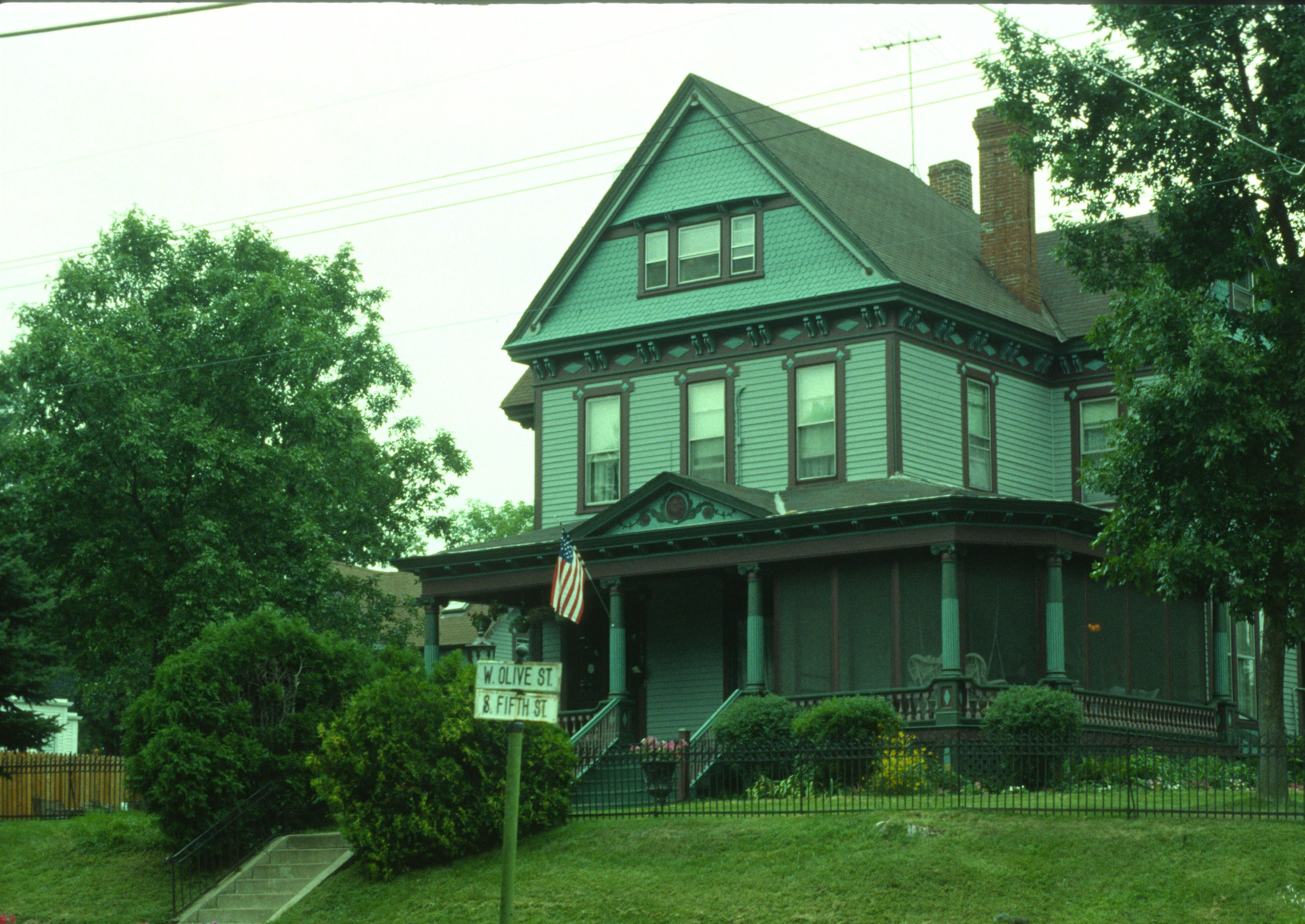
John and Anna O'Brien House in Stillwater, Minnesota, showcasing the prominent gable, pedimented porch and columns, all characteristic of the Queen Anne style

Gabled and domestically scaled, these early American Queen Anne homes were built of warm, soft brick enclosing square terracotta panels, with an arched side passage leading to an inner court and back house. Their detailing is largely confined to the treatment of picturesquely disposed windows, with small-paned upper sashes and plate glass lower ones. Triple windows of a Serlian motif and a two-story oriel window that projects asymmetrically were frequently featured.

The most famous American Queen Anne residence is the Carson Mansion in Eureka, California. Newsom and Newsom were notable builder-architects of 19th-century California homes and public buildings, and they designed and constructed (1884–1886) this 18-room home for William Carson, one of California's first lumber barons.

== Variants ==
=== Free Classic ===
After 1885, use of Eastlake-style trim shifted to "free classic" or Colonial Revival trim, including pedimented entryways and Palladian windows.

=== Queen Anne cottage ===
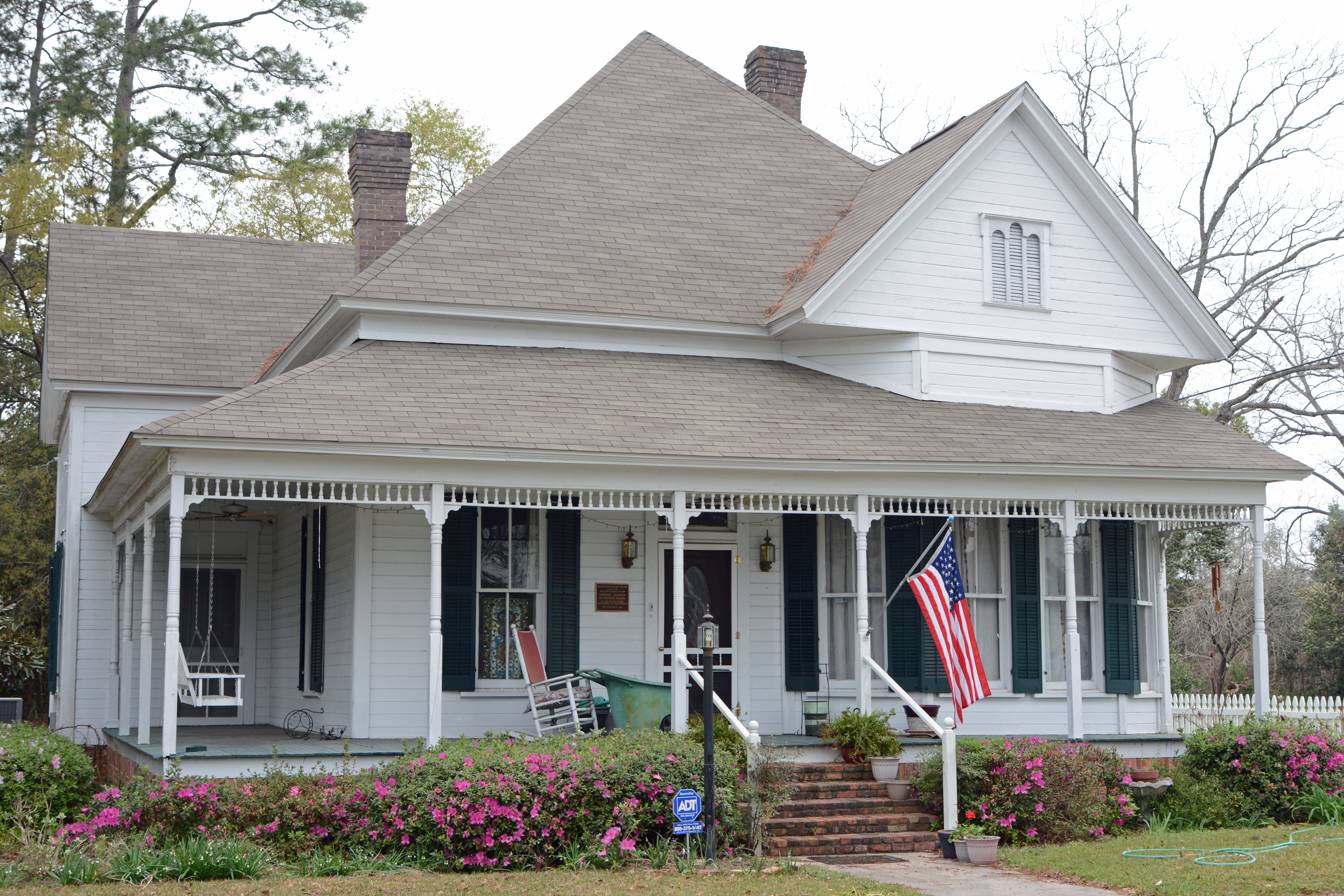
William G. Harrison House, a Queen Anne cottage

Smaller and somewhat plainer houses can also be Queen Anne. The William G. Harrison House is an example, built in 1904 in rural Nashville, Georgia. Characteristics of the Queen Anne cottage style are:

- one- or two-story frame house (second floor where one exists, is a finished attic)
- wrap-around porch with turned posts, decorative brackets, and spindle work
- square layout with projecting gables to front and side
- pyramidal or hipped roof reflecting pyramidal massing
- rooms are asymmetrical and there is no central hallway
- interior-located chimneys
- interior detailing, such as door surrounds, window surrounds, wainscoting, and mantels
- built in 1880s and 1890s for middle class in both urban and rural areas, with popularity in rural areas continuing into early 1900s.

=== Shingle style ===
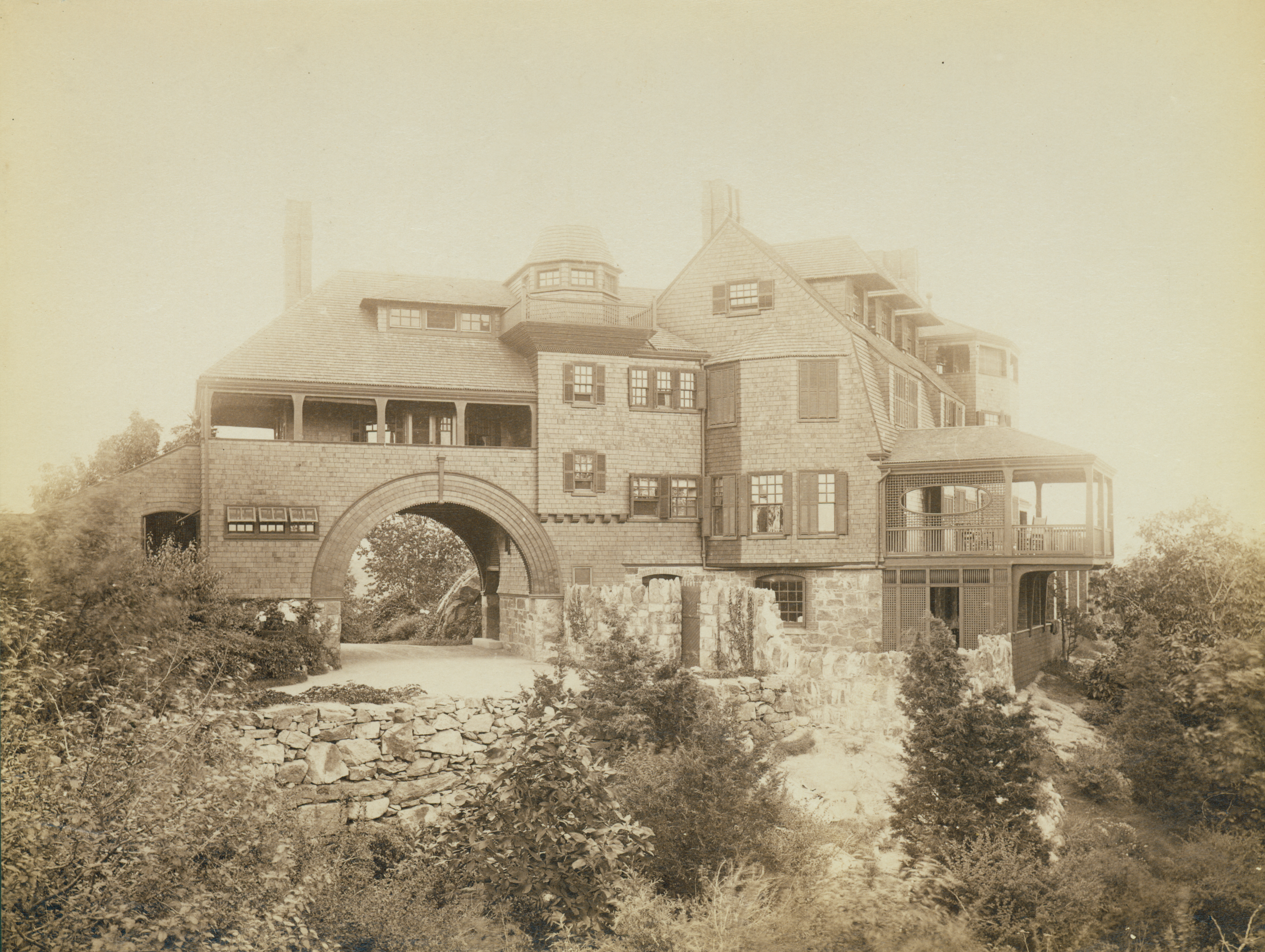
Kragsyde, Manchester-by-the-Sea, Massachusetts (1883, demolished 1929), by Peabody and Stearns

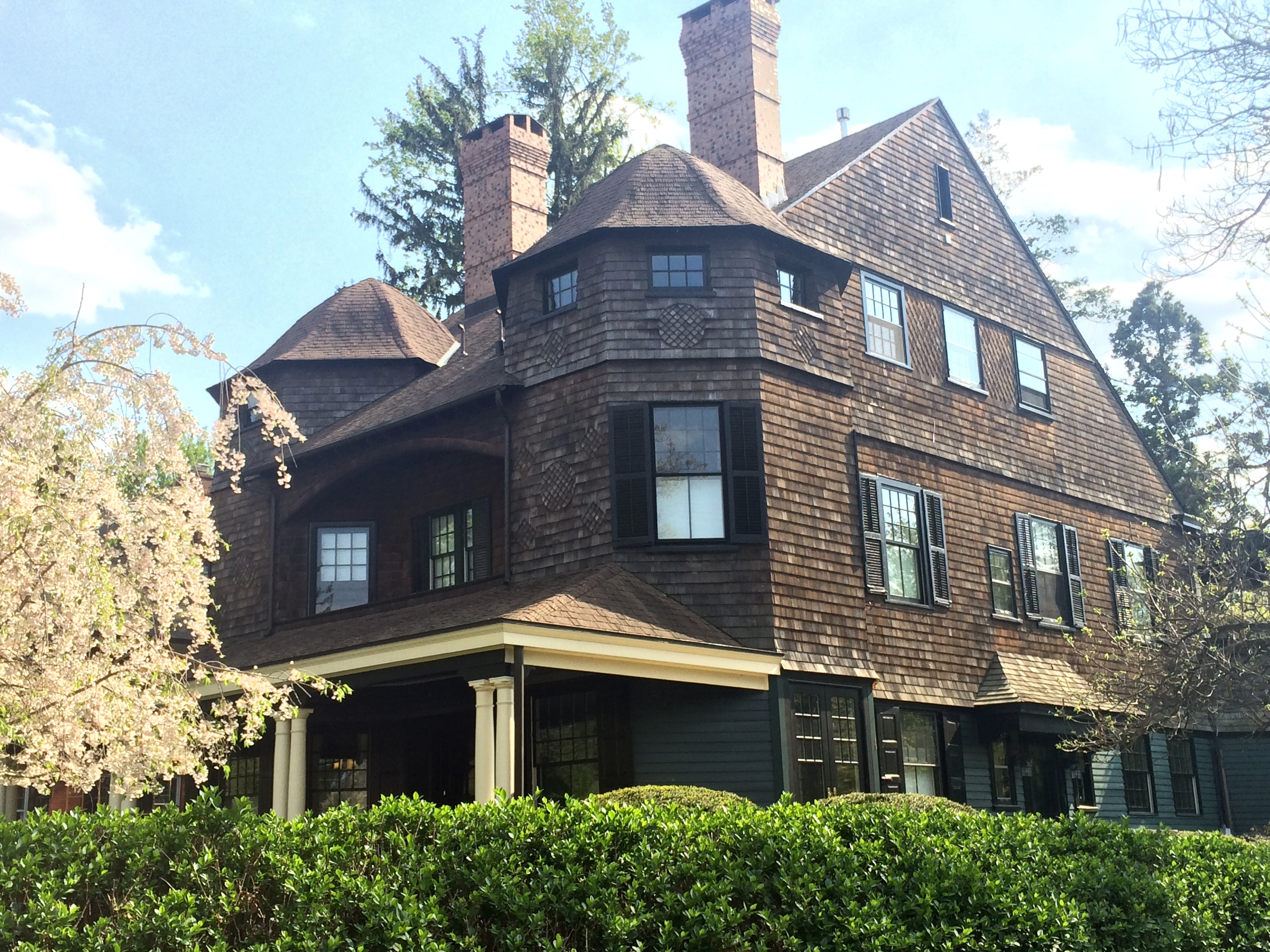
The William Berryman Scott House (1888), designed by A. Page Brown, at 56 Bayard Lane, Princeton, New Jersey, in the Princeton Historic District

The Shingle style in America was made popular by the rise of the New England school of architecture, which eschewed the highly ornamented patterns of the Eastlake style. In the Shingle style, English influence was combined with the renewed interest in Colonial American architecture which followed the 1876 celebration of the United States Centennial. Architects emulated colonial houses' plain, shingled surfaces as well as their massing, whether in the simple gable of McKim, Mead and White's Low House or in the complex massing of Kragsyde, which looked almost as if a colonial house had been fancifully expanded over many years. This impression of the passage of time was enhanced by the use of shingles. Some architects, in order to attain a weathered look on a new building, even had the cedar shakes dipped in buttermilk, dried, and then installed, to leave a grayish tinge to the façade.

The shingle-style also conveyed a sense of the house as continuous volume. This effect—of the building as an envelope of space, rather than a great mass, was enhanced by the visual tautness of the flat shingled surfaces, the horizontal shape of many shingle-style houses, and the emphasis on horizontal continuity, both in exterior details and in the flow of spaces within the houses.

McKim, Mead and White and Peabody and Stearns were two of the notable firms of the era that helped to popularize the shingle style, through their large-scale commissions for "seaside cottages" of the rich and the well-to-do in such places as Newport, Rhode Island. However, the most famous Shingle-style house built in America was "Kragsyde" (1882), the summer home commissioned by Bostonian G. Nixon Black, from Peabody and Stearns. Kragsyde was built atop the rocky coastal shore near Manchester-by-the-Sea, Massachusetts, and embodied every possible tenet of the shingle style.

Many of the concepts of the Shingle style were adopted by Gustav Stickley, and adapted to the American version of the Arts and Crafts Movement.

== See also ==
- Category: Victorian architectural styles
- Category: Victorian architecture in the United States
