= James Alldis House =

Historic house in Connecticut, United States

- U.S. National Register of Historic Places
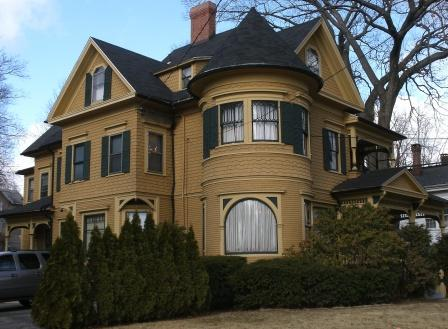

- Location within Connecticut Location within the United States
- Interactive map showing the location for James Alldis House
- Location: 355 Prospect Street, Torrington, Connecticut
- Coordinates: 41°48′16″N 73°7′24″W
- Area: less than one acre
- Built: 1895
- Architectural style: Queen Anne Revival
- NRHP reference No.: 82004480
- Added to NRHP: April 29, 1982

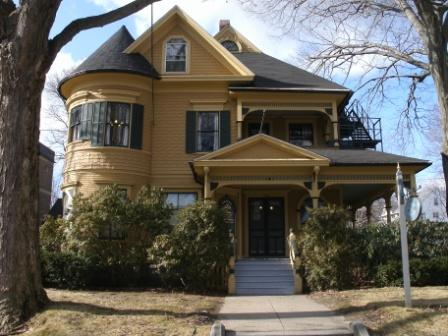

The James Alldis House is a Queen Anne style house at 355 Prospect Street in Torrington, Connecticut which is significant for it being a fine, well-preserved example of Queen Anne architecture, and also locally for its association with the largest industry in Torrington, the needle manufacturing plant which became the Torrington Company. It was built for James Alldis, supervisor at the firm, and a leading citizen of Torrington. The house was built in 1895 and retains most of its original features, including the hardwood floors, most of the original lighting fixtures and door hardware, and the original hot air heat distribution system. It was listed on the National Register of Historic Places in 1982.

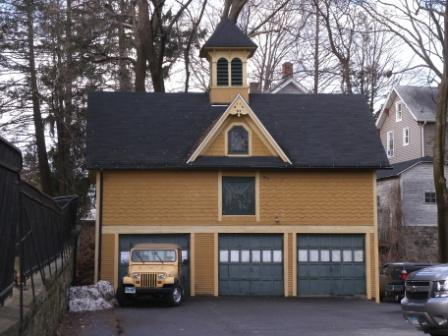
Carriage house

The property includes a second contributing building, which is a carriage house.

The house's "irregular plan and massing", its round tower with conical roof, and its "elaborate porch of sawn and turned woodwork", and "intricacy of detail" elsewhere are all characteristic of Queen Anne style exteriors. Besides variety in massing, variety is also expressed in a wide variety of window designs and surface textures. The first floor exterior is straight-lined, composed of narrow smooth clapboards; the exterior of the second floor and above is textured and wavy in its edges.

The house's interior is also Queen Anne style overall in that it includes classical detail work (of a variety of named styles), and it also is very well preserved. Interior details include a tiled fireplace. The house has two colored-glass windows, one believed to be from Tiffany Studios and one from Bigelow Studios.

== James Alldis ==
James Alldis (1839–1910) was a leading citizen. English-born, he immigrated to the U.S. at age 14. He was supervisor of the Excelsior Needle Company, a needle manufacturing firm which became the Torrington Company, and which was the largest employer in Torrington. He worked there from 1869 to 1899, when he retired. He was a "principal shareholder" in the Torrington and Winsted Street Railway and served as its president from 1899 to 1906, when it was sold to the New York, New Haven and Hartford Railroad. He was a Democrat in a Republican town. He purchased the property to have this substantial house built in 1895.

== Recent use ==
In 1895, the house's location was in a "fine residential neighborhood" although very close to the downtown business area. Currently there is a church and other institutional buildings on the same block, and the Alldis House and at least one other house have been adapted for non-residential use. The house now houses a law firm on two floors and an apartment above.

== See also ==
- National Register of Historic Places listings in Litchfield County, Connecticut
