= 1114 Arthur Currie Lane =

Historic house in Victoria, British Columbia, Canada

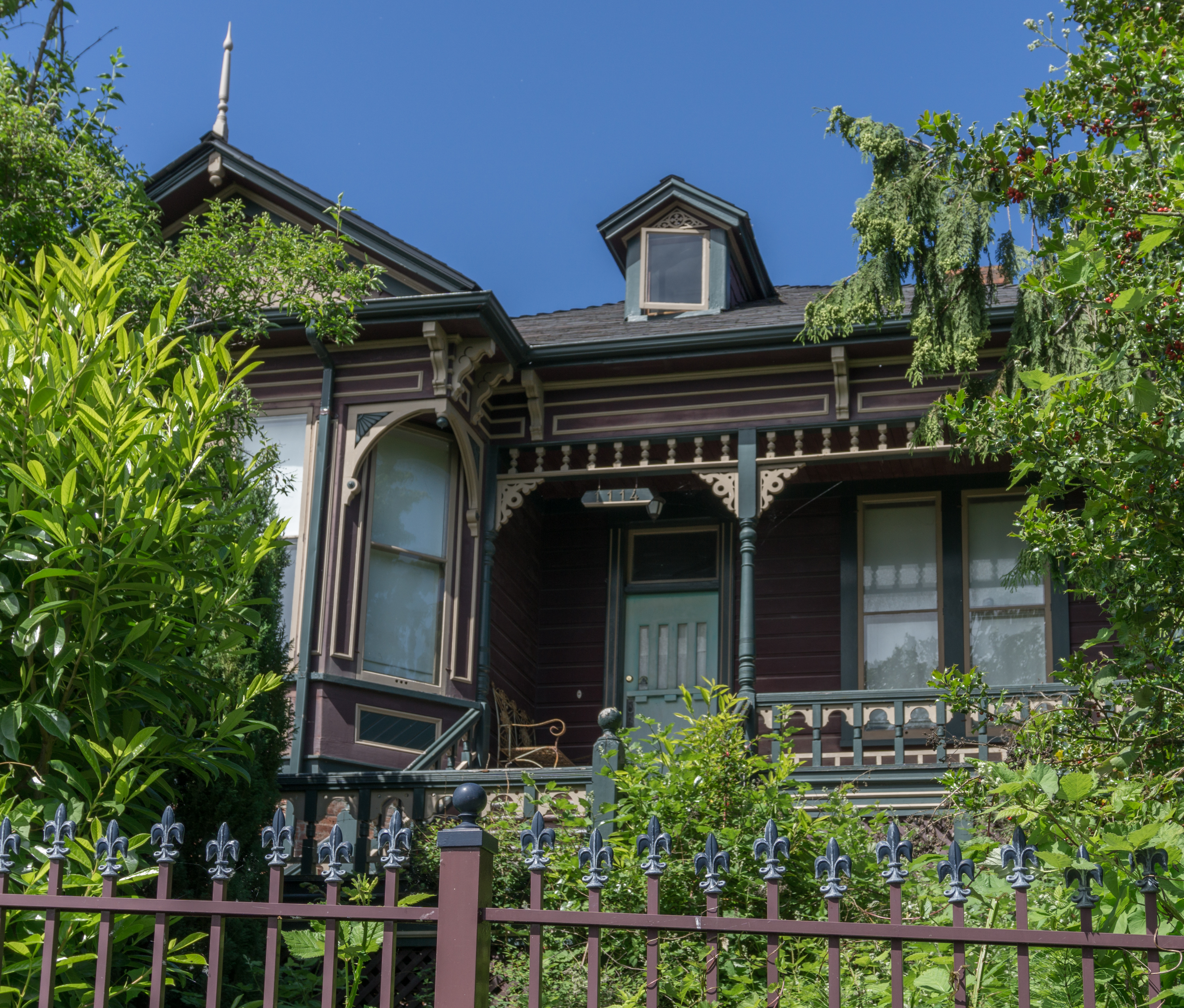
- The building's exterior in 2018
- Interactive map of the 1114 Arthur Currie Lane area

General information
- Architectural style: Queen Anne, Italianate
- Location: 1114 Arthur Currie Lane, Victoria, British Columbia, Canada
- Coordinates: 48.4370°N 123.3837°W
- Construction started: 1892

Technical details
- Floor count: 2

1114 Arthur Currie Lane is an historic building in Victoria, British Columbia, Canada.

It was the pre-World War I home of General Sir Arthur William Currie GCMG KCB VD. Currie became Canada's first full general in 1915, and was placed in charge of the entire Canadian Corps, independent of the British Army, by 1917. He is given credit for the success of the Battle of Vimy Ridge in 1917 and was knighted by King George V.

Currie was also an educator, and from 1920 until his death in 1933 he served as Principal and Vice Chancellor of McGill University in Montreal, Quebec.

His home, built in 1892, is a fine example of a small Queen Anne cottage with Italianate features. Its original fieldstone wall and mature plantings surrounding the house lend to the value. It is part of the Catherine Street Heritage Conservation Area and is highly visible from below on the pedestrian walkway, and across the Selkirk Water.

== See also ==
- List of historic places in Victoria, British Columbia
