= New World Queen Anne Revival architecture =

Architectural style

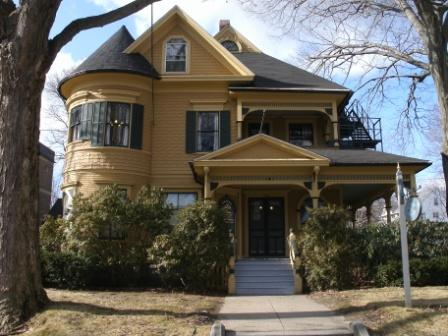
James Alldis House in Connecticut

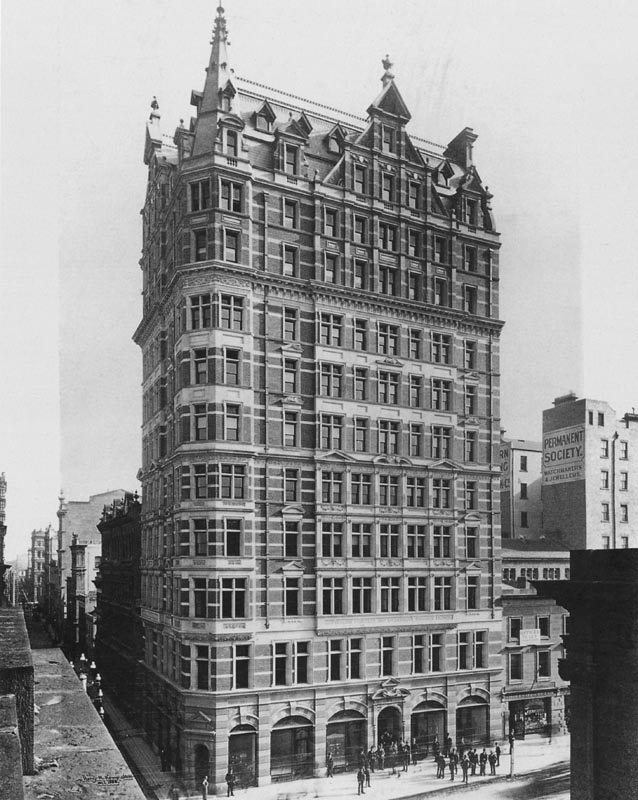
APA Building, Melbourne, Australia

In the New World, Queen Anne Revival was a historicist architectural style of the late 19th and early 20th centuries. It was popular in the United States, Canada, Australia, and other countries. In Australia, it is also called Federation architecture.

== United States ==
In the United States, Queen Anne Revival architecture was popular from roughly 1880 to 1910. "Queen Anne" was one of a number of popular architectural styles to emerge during the Victorian era. Within the Victorian era timeline, Queen Anne style followed the Stick style and preceded the Richardsonian Romanesque and Shingle styles.

The style bears almost no relationship to the English Baroque architecture produced in the actual reign of Queen Anne from 1702 to 1714. It is loosely used of a wide range of picturesque buildings with "free Renaissance" (non-Gothic Revival) details rather than of a specific formulaic style in its own right. "Queen Anne", as an alternative both to the French-derived Second Empire and the less "domestic" Beaux-Arts architecture, is broadly applied to architecture, furniture and decorative arts of the period 1880 to 1910; some "Queen Anne" architectural elements, such as the wraparound front porch, continued to be found into the 1920s.

=== Features ===
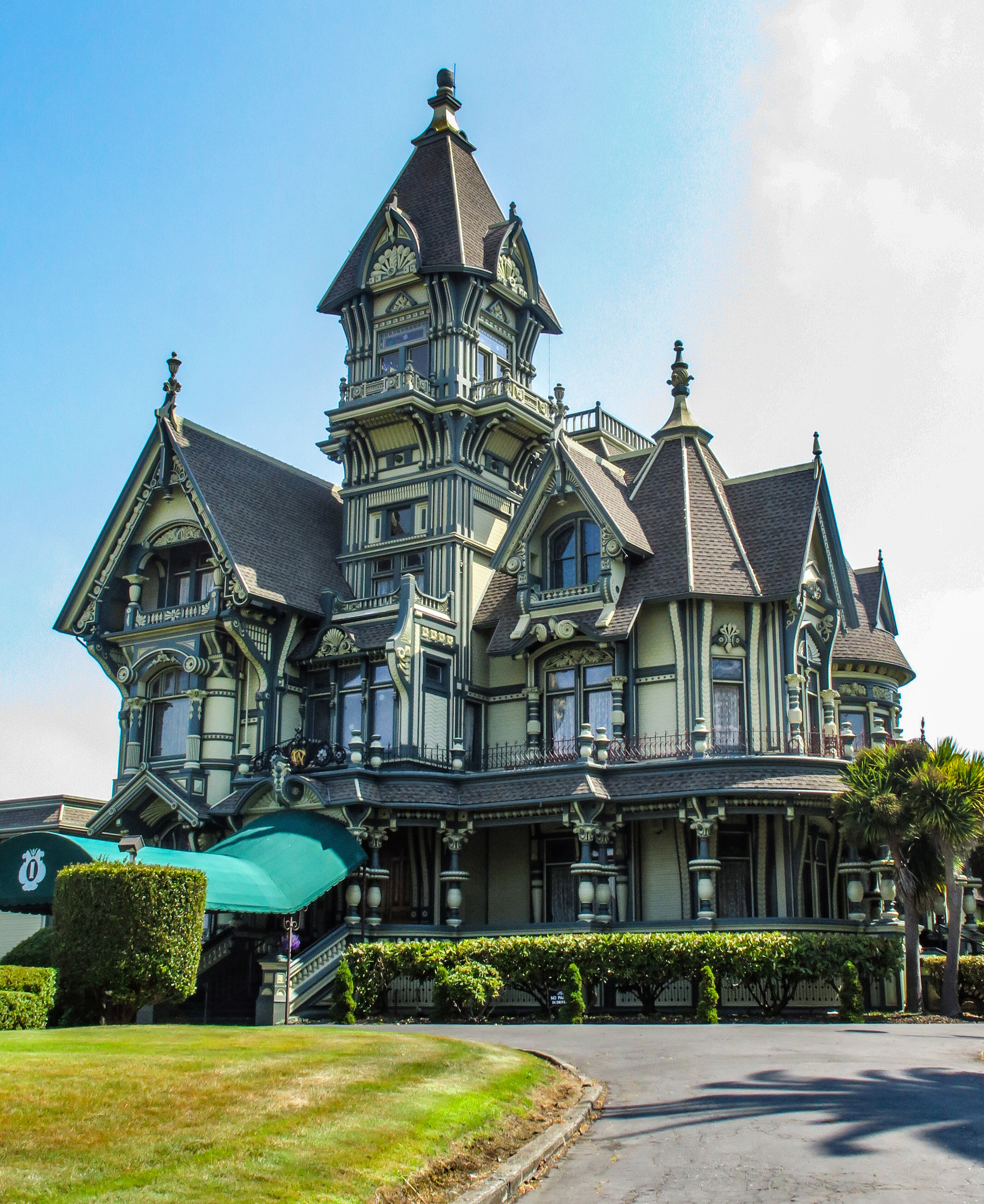
The Carson Mansion in Eureka, California, is considered one of the finest examples of American Queen Anne style architecture.

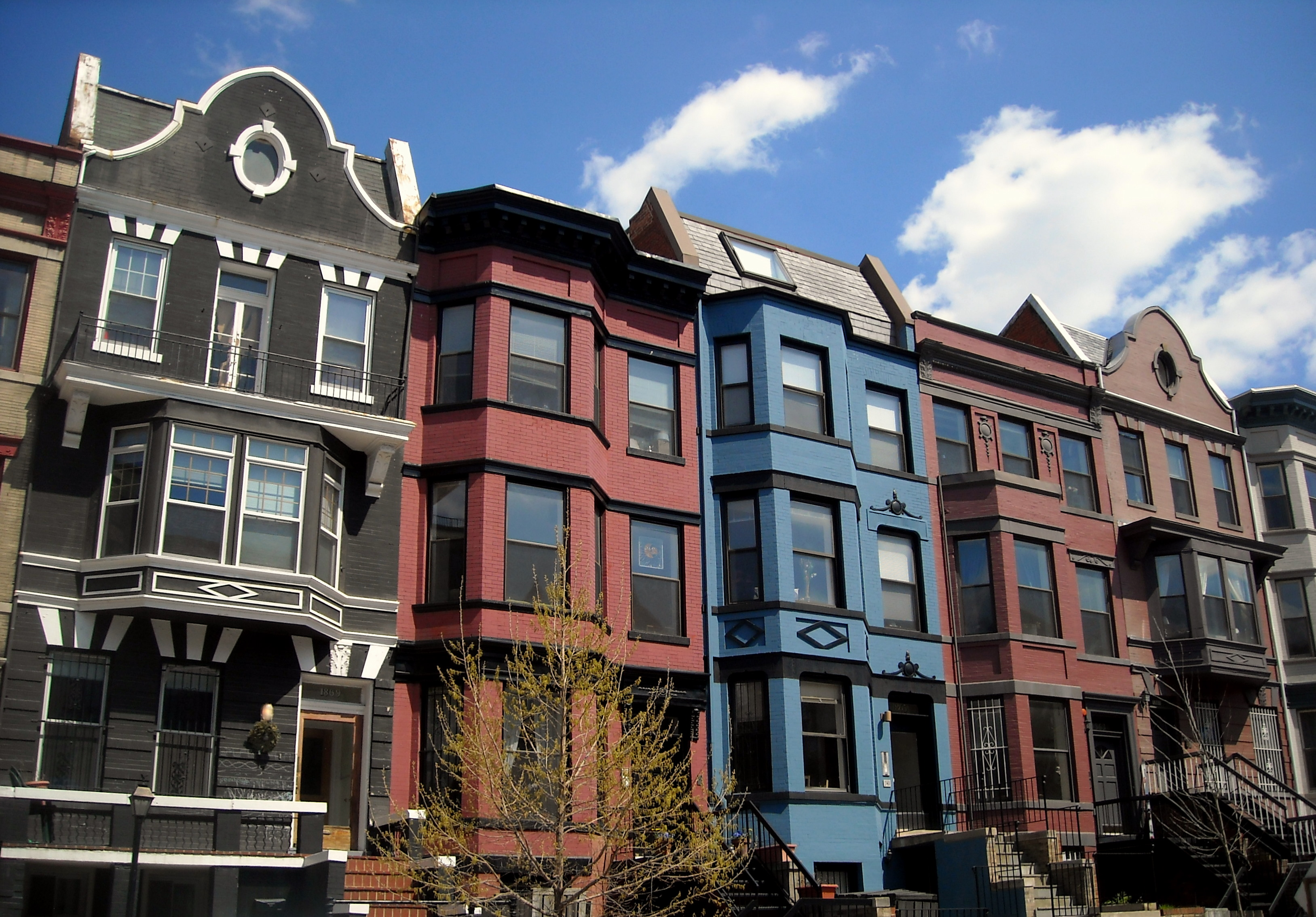
Queen Anne–style rowhouses located in the Adams Morgan neighborhood of Washington, D.C.

Queen Anne style buildings in America came into vogue in the 1880s, replacing the French-derived Second Empire as the "style of the moment." The popularity of high Queen Anne Style waned in the early 1900s, but some elements continued to be found on buildings into the 1920s, such as the wrap-around front porch (often L-shaped).

Distinctive features of the American Queen Anne style may include:

- asymmetrical façade
- dominant front-facing gable, often cantilevered beyond the plane of the wall below
- overhanging eaves
- round, square, or polygonal towers
- shaped and Dutch gables
- a porch covering part or all of the front façade, including the primary entrance area
- a second-story porch or balconies
- pedimented porches
- differing wall textures, such as patterned wood shingles shaped into varying designs, including resembling fish scales, terra cotta tiles, relief panels, or wooden shingles over brickwork, etc.
- dentils
- classical columns
- spindle work
- oriel and bay windows
- horizontal bands of leaded windows
- monumental chimneys
- painted balustrades
- wooden or slate roofs
- front gardens with wooden fences

The "Queen Anne" style that had been formulated in Britain by Norman Shaw and other architects arrived in New York with the new housing for the New York House and School of Industry (Sidney V. Stratton, architect, 1878) at 120 West 16th Street. Gabled and domestically scaled, these early American Queen Anne homes were built of warm, soft brick enclosing square terracotta panels, with an arched side passage leading to an inner court and back house. Their detailing is largely confined to the treatment of picturesquely disposed windows, with small-paned upper sashes and plate glass lower ones. Triple windows of a Serlian motif and a two-story oriel window that projects asymmetrically were frequently featured. The Astral Apartments built in Brooklyn in 1885–1886 to house dock workers provide a similar example of red-brick and terracotta Queen Anne architecture in New York.

E. Francis Baldwin's stations for the Baltimore and Ohio Railroad are also familiar examples of the style, built variously of brick and wood. The most famous American Queen Anne residence is the William Carson Mansion of Eureka, California (see photo). Newsom and Newsom were notable builder-architects of 19th-century California homes and public buildings, and they designed and constructed (1884–1886) this 18-room home for one of California's first lumber barons.

=== Queen Anne cottage ===
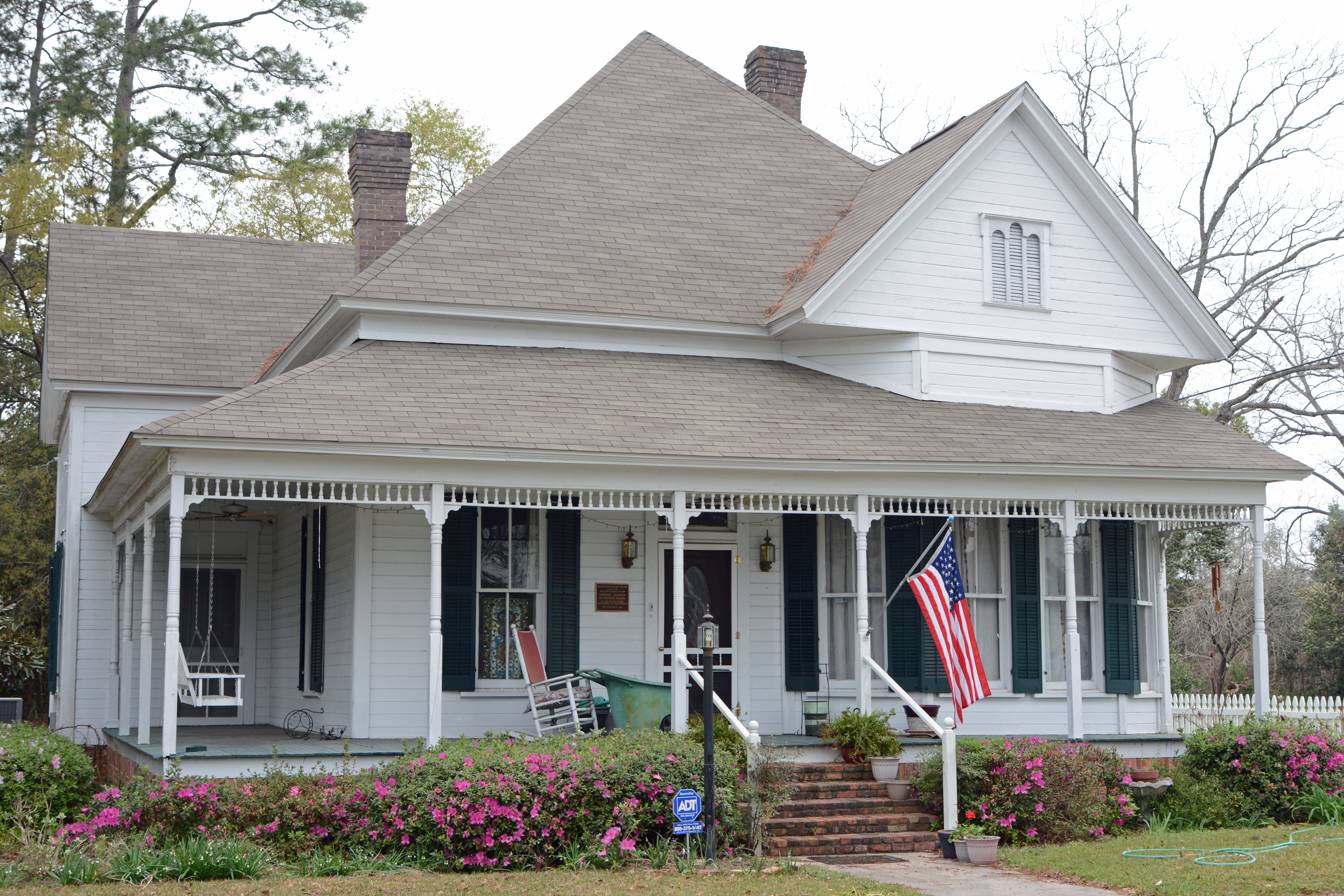
William G. Harrison House, a Queen Anne cottage

Smaller and somewhat plainer houses can also be Queen Anne. The William G. Harrison House is an example, built in 1904 in rural Nashville, Georgia. Characteristics of the Queen Anne cottage style are:

- frame house typically one-story (although there may be a finished attic or garret for a second floor)
- wrap-around porch with turned posts, decorative brackets, and spindlework
- square layout with projecting gables to front and side
- pyramidal or hipped roof reflecting pyramidal massing
- rooms are asymmetrical and there is no central hallway
- interior-located chimneys
- interior detailing, such as door surrounds, window surrounds, wainscoting, and mantels
- built in 1880s and 1890s for middle class in both urban and rural areas, with popularity in rural areas continuing into early 1900s.

=== Shingle style ===
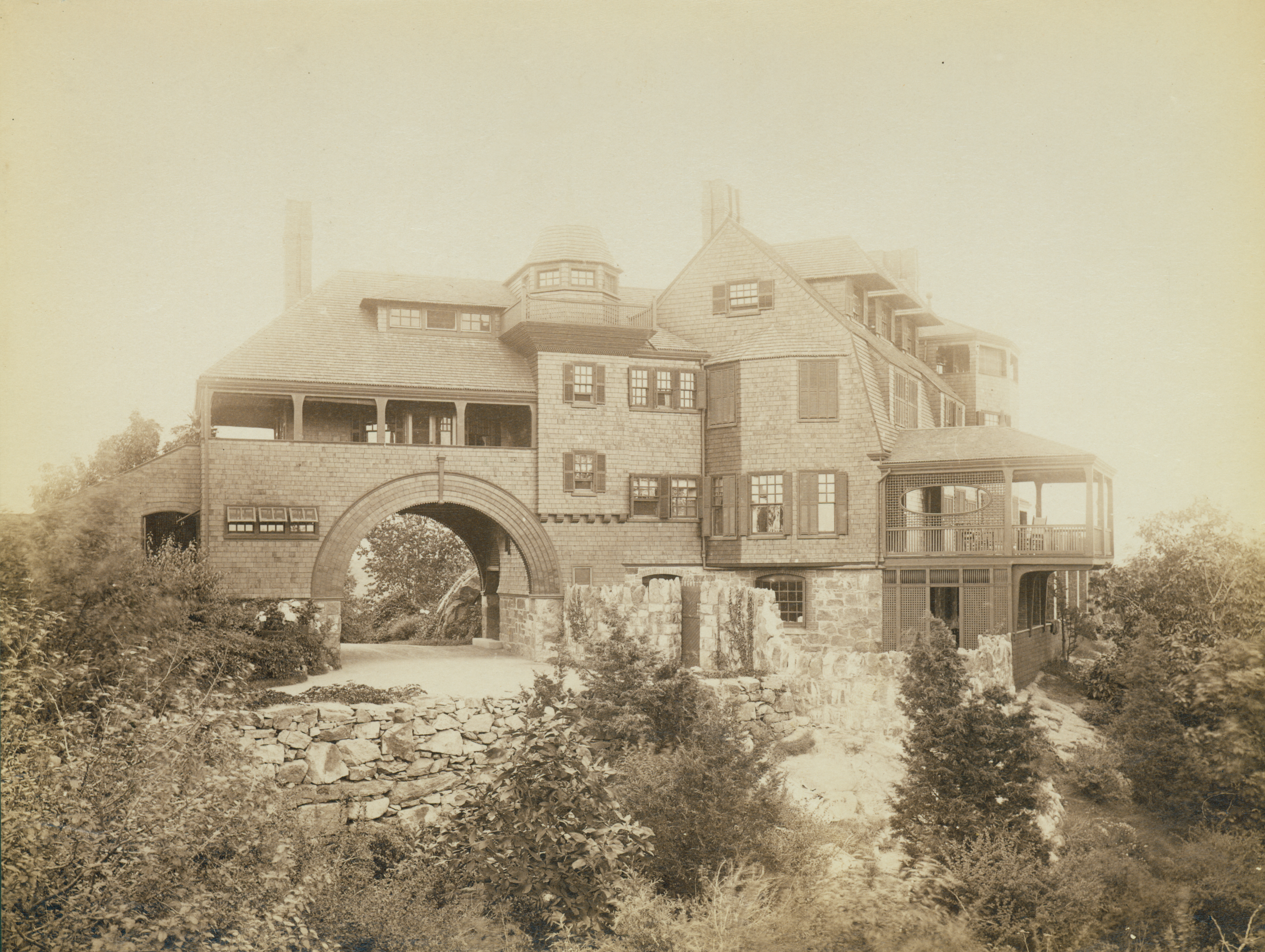
Kragsyde, Manchester-by-the-Sea, Massachusetts (1883, demolished 1929), Peabody and Stearns, architects

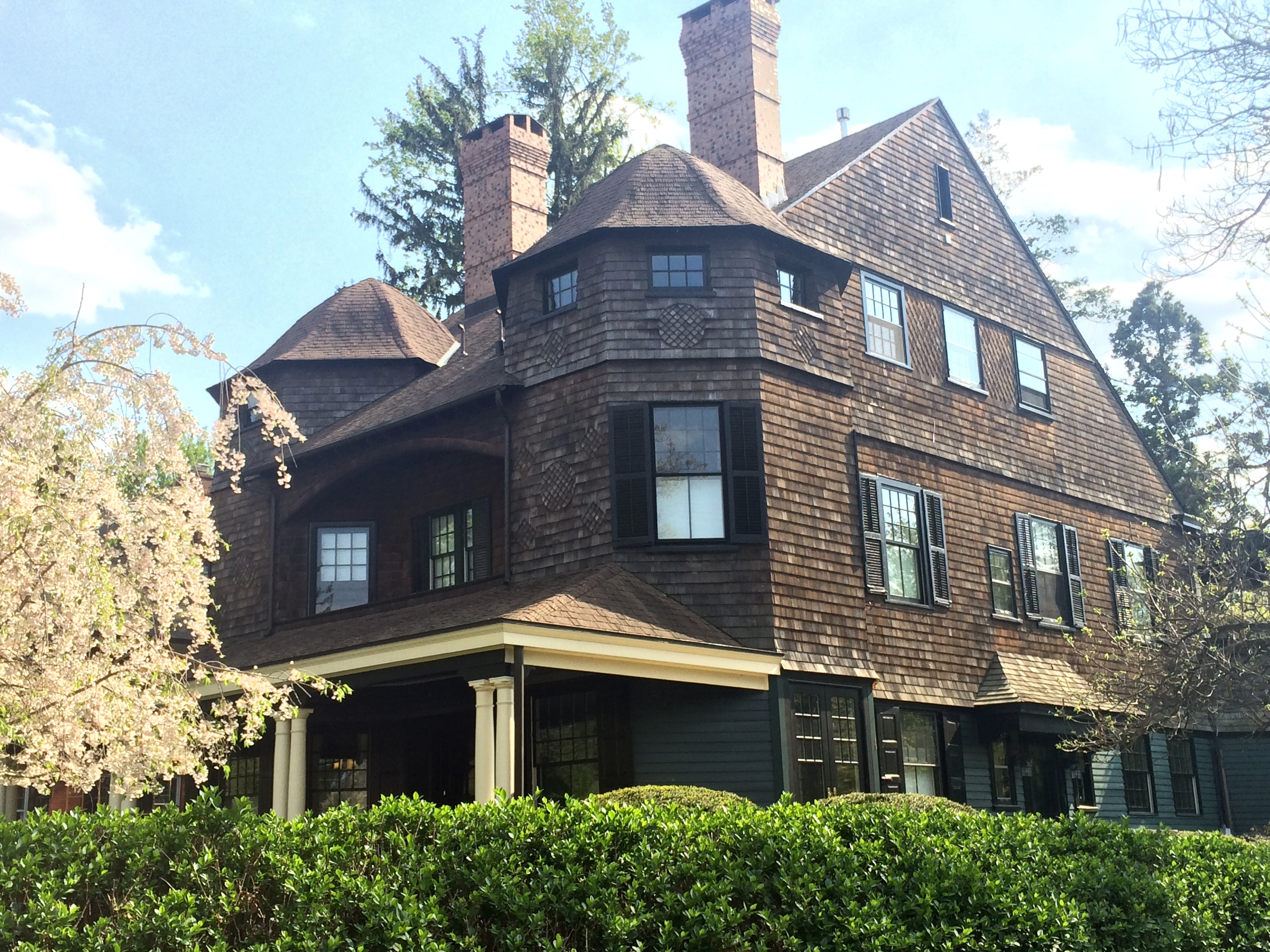
The William Berryman Scott House (1888), designed by A. Page Brown, at 56 Bayard Lane, Princeton, New Jersey in the Princeton Historic District

The Shingle style in America was made popular by the rise of the New England school of architecture, which eschewed the highly ornamented patterns of the Eastlake style. In the Shingle style, English influence was combined with the renewed interest in Colonial American architecture which followed the 1876 celebration of the United States Centennial. Architects emulated colonial houses' plain, shingled surfaces as well as their massing, whether in the simple gable of McKim, Mead and White's Low House or in the complex massing of Kragsyde, which looked almost as if a colonial house had been fancifully expanded over many years. This impression of the passage of time was enhanced by the use of shingles. Some architects, in order to attain a weathered look on a new building, even had the cedar shakes dipped in buttermilk, dried and then installed, to leave a grayish tinge to the façade.

The Shingle style also conveyed a sense of the house as continuous volume. This effect—of the building as an envelope of space, rather than a great mass, was enhanced by the visual tautness of the flat shingled surfaces, the horizontal shape of many shingle-style houses, and the emphasis on horizontal continuity, both in exterior details and in the flow of spaces within the houses.

McKim, Mead and White and Peabody and Stearns were two of the notable firms of the era that helped to popularize the shingle style, through their large-scale commissions for "seaside cottages" of the rich and the well-to-do in such places as Newport, Rhode Island. However, the most famous Shingle-style house built in America was "Kragsyde" (1882), the summer home commissioned by Bostonian G. Nixon Black, from Peabody and Stearns. Kragsyde was built atop the rocky coastal shore near Manchester-By-the-Sea, Massachusetts, and embodied every possible tenet of the shingle style.

Many of the concepts of the Shingle style were adopted by Gustav Stickley, and adapted to the American version of the Arts and Crafts Movement.

== Canada ==
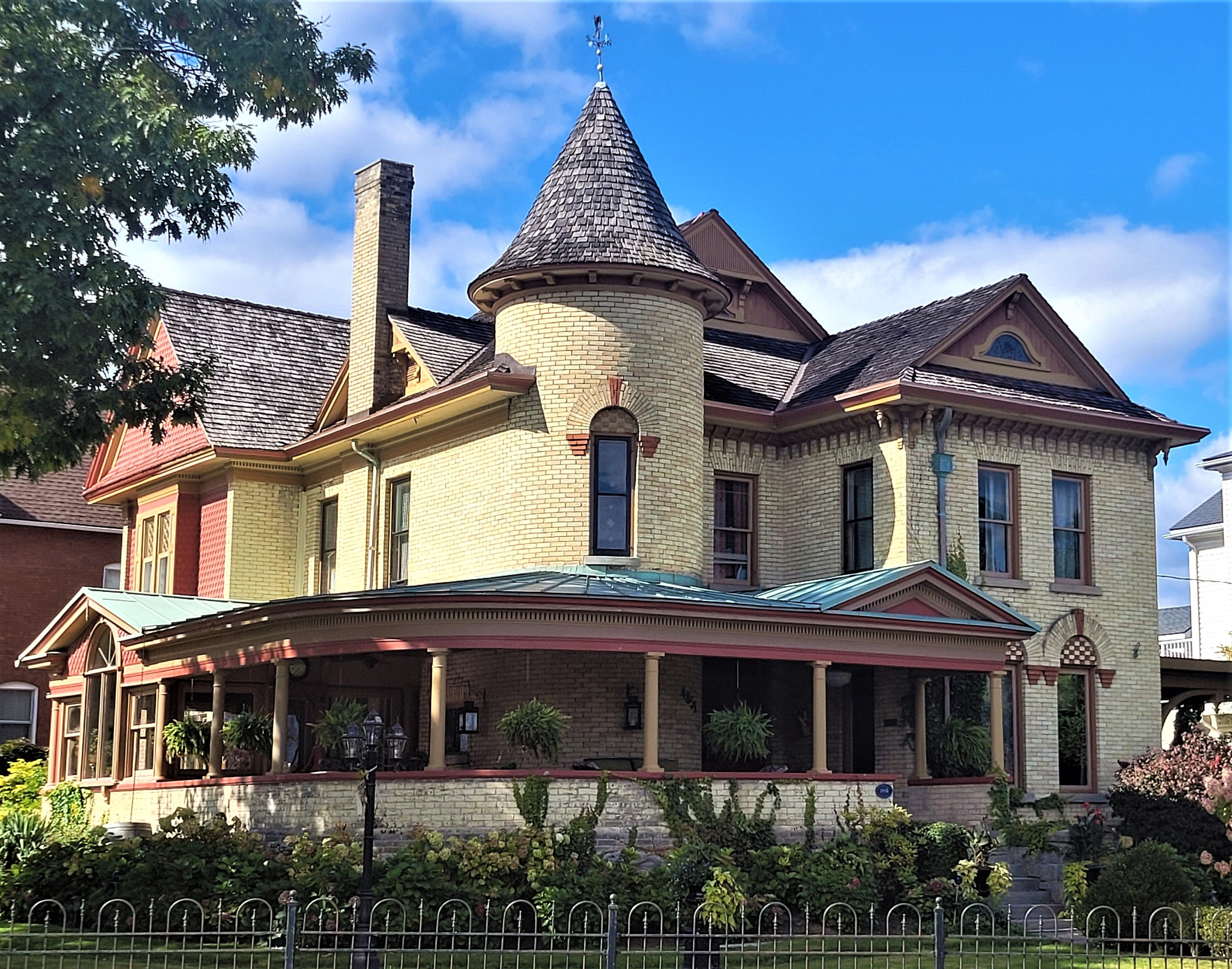
Doran-Marshall Residence, Niagara Falls, Ontario

== Australia ==
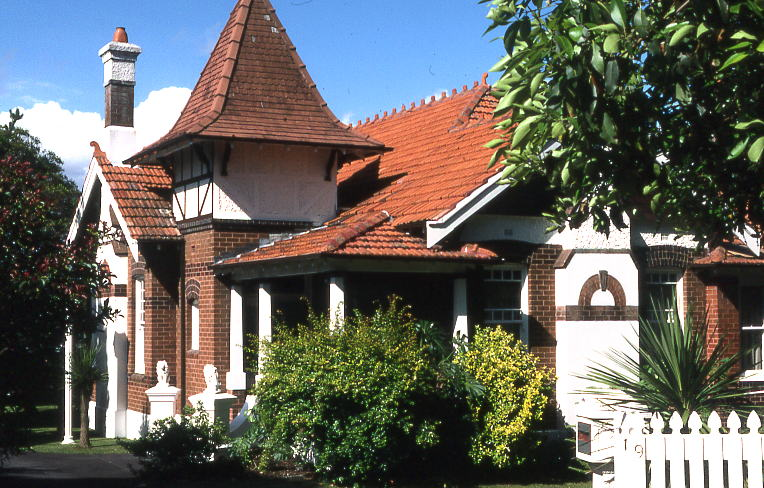
'Vallambrosa', a Queen Anne Style house located at 19 Appian Way in the Sydney suburb of Burwood

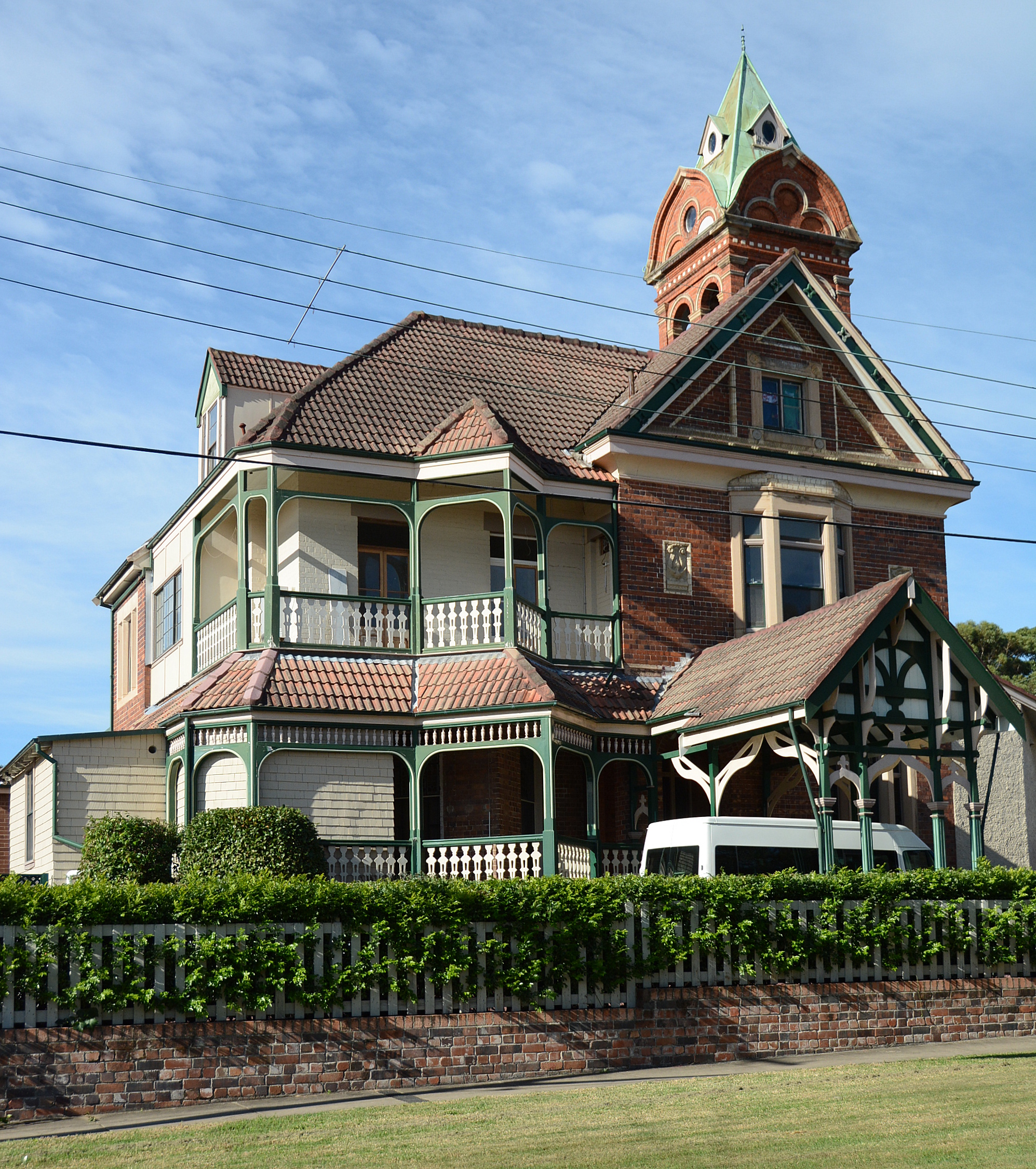
Amesbury, in the Sydney suburb of Ashfield

In Australia, the Queen Anne style was absorbed into the Federation style, which was, broadly speaking, the Australian equivalent of the Edwardian style, derived from the influence of Richard Norman Shaw, an influential British architect of the late Victorian era. The Federation period went from 1890 to 1915 and included twelve styles, one of which was the Federation Queen Anne. This became the most popular style for houses built between 1890 and 1910. The style often used Tudor-style woodwork and elaborate fretwork that replaced the Victorian taste for wrought iron. Verandahs were usually a feature, as were the image of the rising sun and Australian wildlife; plus circular windows, turrets and towers with conical or pyramid-shaped roofs.

The first Queen Anne house in Australia was Caerleon in the suburb of Bellevue Hill, New South Wales. Caerleon was designed initially by a Sydney architect, Harry Kent, but was then substantially reworked in London by Maurice Adams. This led to some controversy over who deserved the credit. The house was built in 1885 and was the precursor for the Federation Queen Anne houses that were to become so popular.

Caerleon was followed soon after by West Maling, in the suburb of Penshurst, New South Wales, and Annesbury, in the suburb of Ashfield, New South Wales, both built circa 1888. These houses, although built around the same time, had distinct styles, West Maling displaying a strong Tudor influence that was not present in Annesbury. The style soon became increasingly popular, appealing predominantly to reasonably well-off people with an "Establishment" leaning.

The style as it developed in Australia was highly eclectic, blending Queen Anne elements with various Australian influences. Old English characteristics like ribbed chimneys and gabled roofs were combined with Australian elements like encircling verandahs, designed to keep the sun out. One outstanding example of this eclectic approach is Urrbrae House, in the Adelaide suburb of Urrbrae, South Australia, part of the Waite Institute. Another variation with connections to the Federation Queen Anne style was the Federation Bungalow, featuring prominent verandahs. This style generally incorporated familiar Queen Anne elements, but usually in simplified form.

== Argentina ==
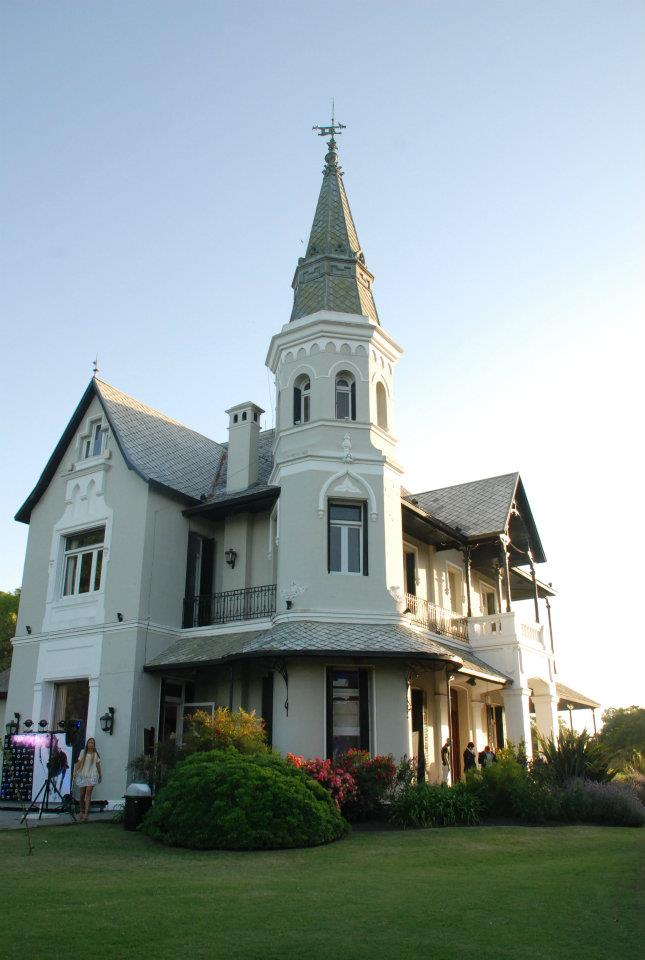
The Pando-Carabassa House (1900), Pilar, Buenos Aires, headquarters of the Argentine Polo Association.

Examples include the Villa Ocampo (1891) in San Isidro, Buenos Aires; and the Pando-Carabassa House (1900), in Pilar, Buenos Aires.

== See also ==
- Category: Victorian architectural styles
- Category: Victorian architecture in the United States
