= Sidney V. Stratton =

American architect

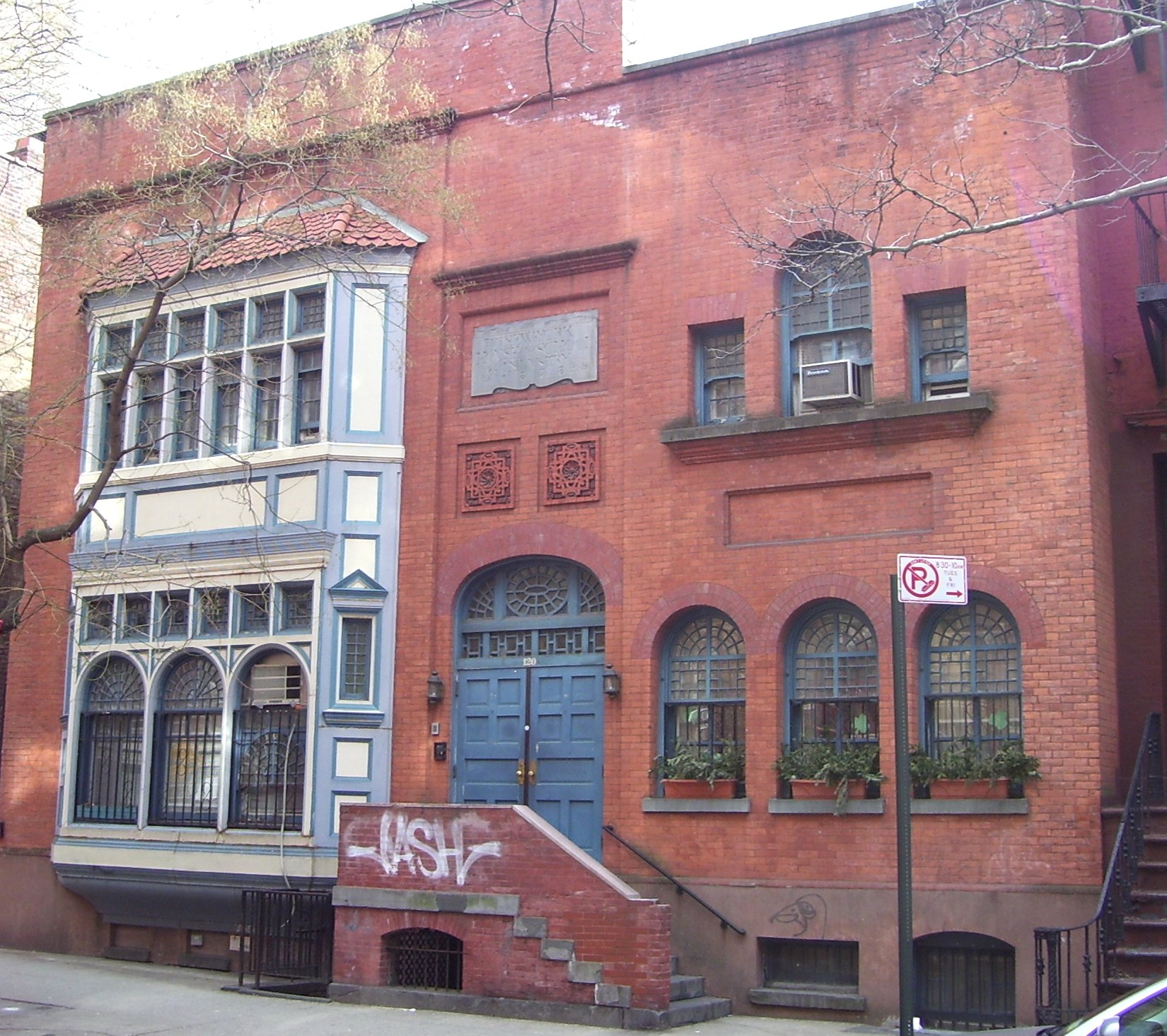
The New York House and School of Industry building, among the first Queen Anne buildings in the United States

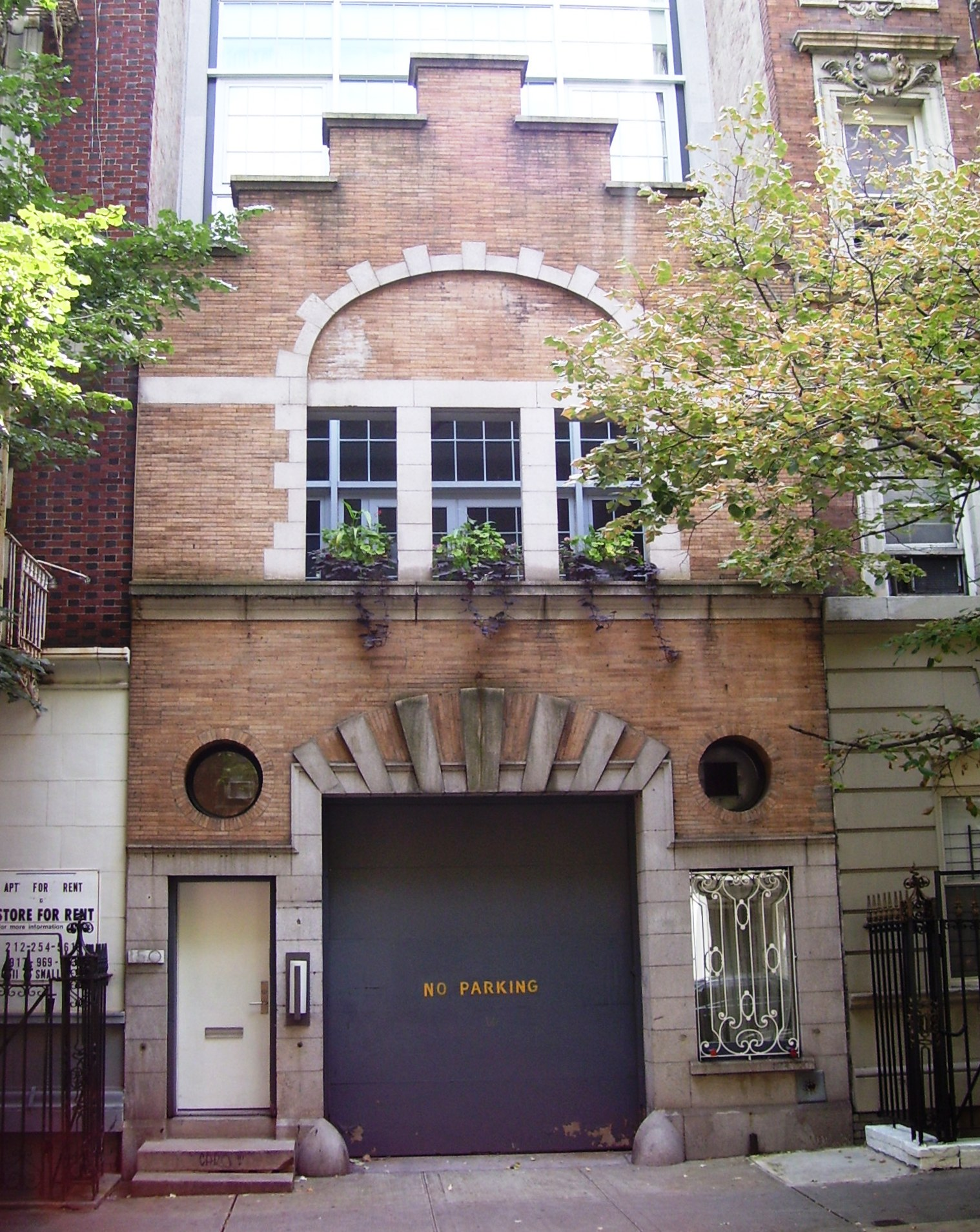
Stratton's gabled carriage house at 150 East 22nd Street now has a modern steel and glass addition c.2000

Sidney Vanuxem Stratton (August 8, 1845 – June 17, 1921) was an American architect born in Natchez, Mississippi, but whose practice was entirely in New York City. Stratton is now scarcely known, but he was one of the first American architecture students at the École des Beaux-Arts in Paris, along with H. H. Richardson and Richard Morris Hunt, in whose office he worked in the 1870s before establishing his own practice.

In his picturesque structure for the New York House and School at 120 West 16th Street (1878), a charitable institution teaching sewing skills to poor women, he introduced the Queen Anne style to the United States. This building was designated a New York City landmark in 1990. At the Seventh Regiment Armory, Stratton's Queen Anne-style room for the affluent and socially prominent Company K, of which he was a member, is among the best-preserved.

He met Charles Follen McKim at the École, and later collaborated with McKim, Mead, and White – from whom he sublet space from 1877 as an independent contractor – on several projects: a church in Quogue, New York (1884), the redesign of the Elliott Roosevelt town house in New York City the same year, and in redesigned interiors in an early classicizing style, for Mr. and Mrs. Stuyvesant Fish's town house at 19 Gramercy Park South (1887).

Other works include:

- Avamaya, Bar Harbor, Maine, for Maj. George Montague Wheeler (Later known as Blair Eyrie for second owner D.C. Blair) (1894, demolished).
- Carriage House, 150 East 22nd Street, for Miss E.L. Breese (1901); Flemish Renaissance, of Roman brick and limestone, with a stepped gable.

Stratton was a member of the Architectural League of New York. He seems to have retired to Natchez, where he had been born and where his father had married his second wife, Miss Caroline Matilda Williams, daughter of Austin Williams of Natchez.
