= Torrington Company =

Bearing company

Torrington Bearing Manufacturing Company
- Formerly: Excelsior Needle Company
- Founded: February 1866 (as the Excelsior Needle Company)

The Torrington Company was a firm that developed in Torrington, Connecticut, originally called the Excelsior Needle Company. It was formed in 1866 around the new idea of using a "cold swaging" technique to create better sewing machine needles, as Torrington expanded, it began to produce other goods. Since WW2 they focused on producing needle bearings, until their main plants were shut down in 2006. They were bought by Ingersoll-Rand in 1968, and bought again by Timken in 2003.

== History ==
The Excelsior Needle Company was originally formed to exploit a new process for manufacturing needles called "cold swaging," a form of swaging in which the needles were formed with their pointed ends while the metal was cold. This was useful because while early sewing machines had been invented by the mid-1800s, the needles at the time were ineffective and imprecise, hammered out similarly to how blacksmiths formed horseshoes. The Excelsior Needle Company was based on a machine invented In 1864 by two men in Connecticut named Orrin Hopson and Herman Brooks, which could compress sections of steel in a way that they eventually found out was useful for producing better blanks (shaped pieces of metal) for sewing needles. In 1866, Hopson and Brooks sold the patent to the machine to seven businessmen in Wolcottville, Connecticut (a neighborhood in Torrington), for $5,000 and 100 out of the 800 shares in the newly created Excelsior Needle Company.

By the mid-1870s, the Excelsior Needle Company was producing over 30,000 needles a day. In 1890, the Excelsior Needle Company acquired the National Needle Company, based in Springfield, Massachusetts. Around the 1890s, the company expanded and diversified, beginning to produce latch needles for knitting machines, heavy hook needles used in shoemaking, as well as spokes for bicycle wheels (in a subsidiary called the Torrington Swaging Company). As the company expanded further, and sewing needles became less important, the executors of the company transferred the assets of the Excelsior Needle Company to a new parent company called the Torrington Company of Maine.

The company became large in the ball bearing business in the 1930s. It had begun with a 1912 acquisition of a small ball bearing company, which became a significant part of the company's business by the 1920s. In the 1930s, a research engineer named Edmund K. Brown invented a new kind of needle bearing, which eventually became the majority of the company's business. After World War II, in which the US had a large need for needle bearings for military aircraft like B-29 bombers, the production of bearings became the company's central product line.

By time the time it sold to Ingersoll-Rand in 1968, the Torrington Company had become an international company with manufacturing facilities in England, Canada, Germany, Brazil, Italy, Portugal, and Japan, as a leading producing of a broad line of anti-friction bearings. The less-profitable needle business, which had been the original basis of the company for 114 years, was forced to be abandoned by Ingersoll-Rand in 1980. In 1980, it was the largest employer in Torrington.

In 2003 Torrington was purchased by the Timken Company, nearly doubling its size. Timken ceased all operations in Torrington and shut down the plants in 2006. Timken also redistributed employees to their other plants. The rest of the heavy bearing plants and needle bearing plants were eventually sold to JTEKT in 2009. 23 of the 26 factory buildings in Torrington were demolished starting in late October 2023 over the course of a few months. The state Department of Economic and Community Development contributed a $2 million grant to help fund the $4 million demolition project, and ceremony was held by the mayor. According to a representative of the property owners, the demolition will "clear the site for small manufacturers and retail businesses".
