= William G. Harrison House =

Historic house in Georgia, United States

- U.S. National Register of Historic Places
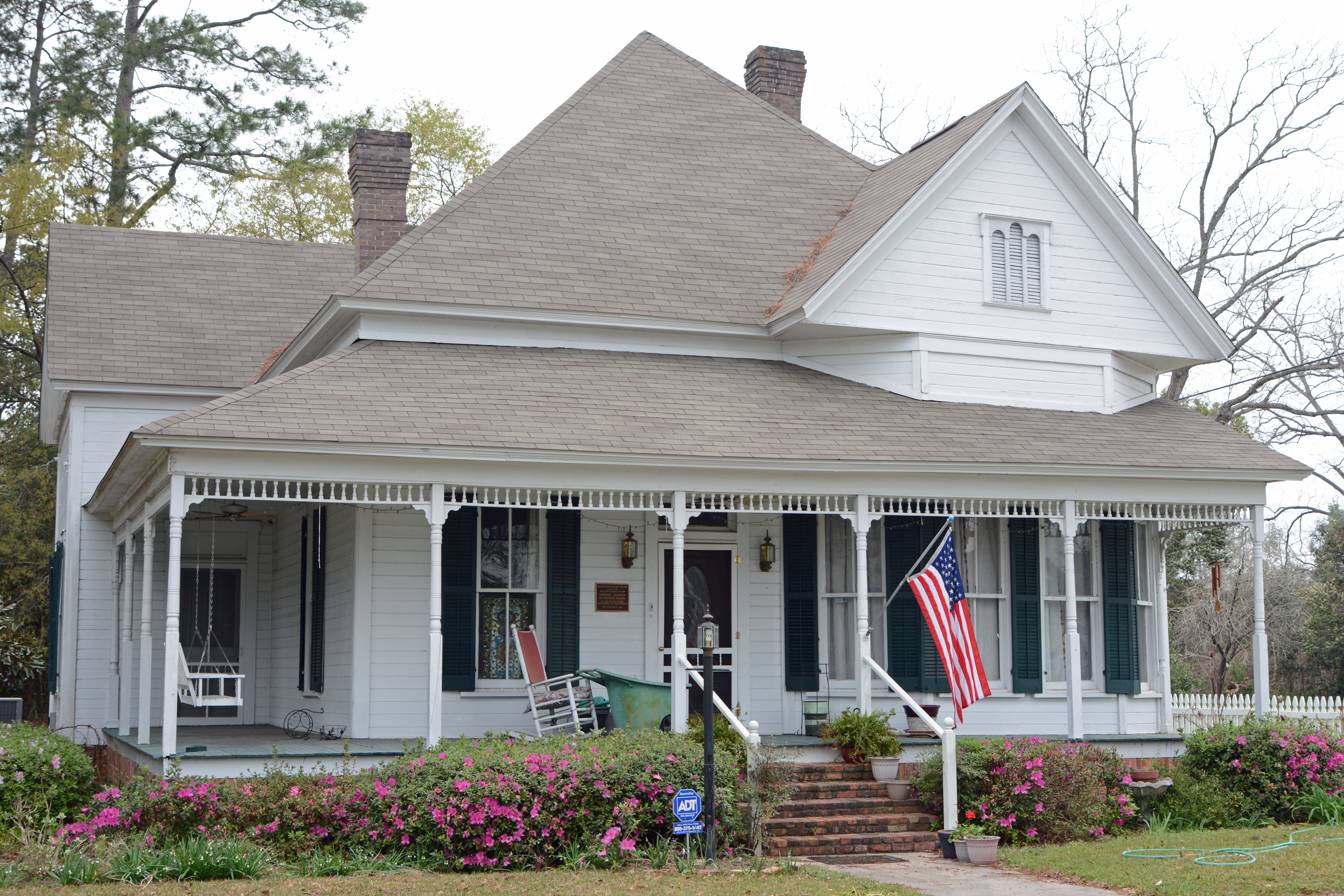

- Location within Georgia
- Location: 313 S. Bartow St., Nashville, Georgia
- Coordinates: 31°12′15″N 83°15′6″W
- Area: less than one acre
- Built: 1904
- Architectural style: Folk Victorian
- NRHP reference No.: 94001636
- Added to NRHP: January 30, 1995

The William G. Harrison House is a historic residence in Nashville, Georgia. It is also known as the Eulalie Taylor House and is located at 313 South Bartow Street. It was built in 1904 and is a one-story frame Queen Anne-style house with Folk Victorian details.

== Description and historic physical appearance ==
It was added to the National Register of Historic Places on January 30, 1995. It was deemed architecturally significant "as a good and exceptionally intact example of a Queen Anne-type cottage with Folk Victorian detailing built at the turn of the [20th] century". Features consistent with the Queen Anne cottage style are:

- characteristic square layout with projecting gables to the front and side
- rooms are asymmetrical and there is no central hallway
- pyramidal roof (hipped roof would also be consistent)
- interior-located chimney
- built in the early 1900s in a rural area (while also popular in both urban and rural areas in the1880s and 1890s)

== Ownership of the property ==
William G. Harrison (1868–1923), a local lawyer and businessman, had the home built and lived in it until his death.

== See also ==
- National Register of Historic Places listings in Berrien County, Georgia
