= Kragsyde =

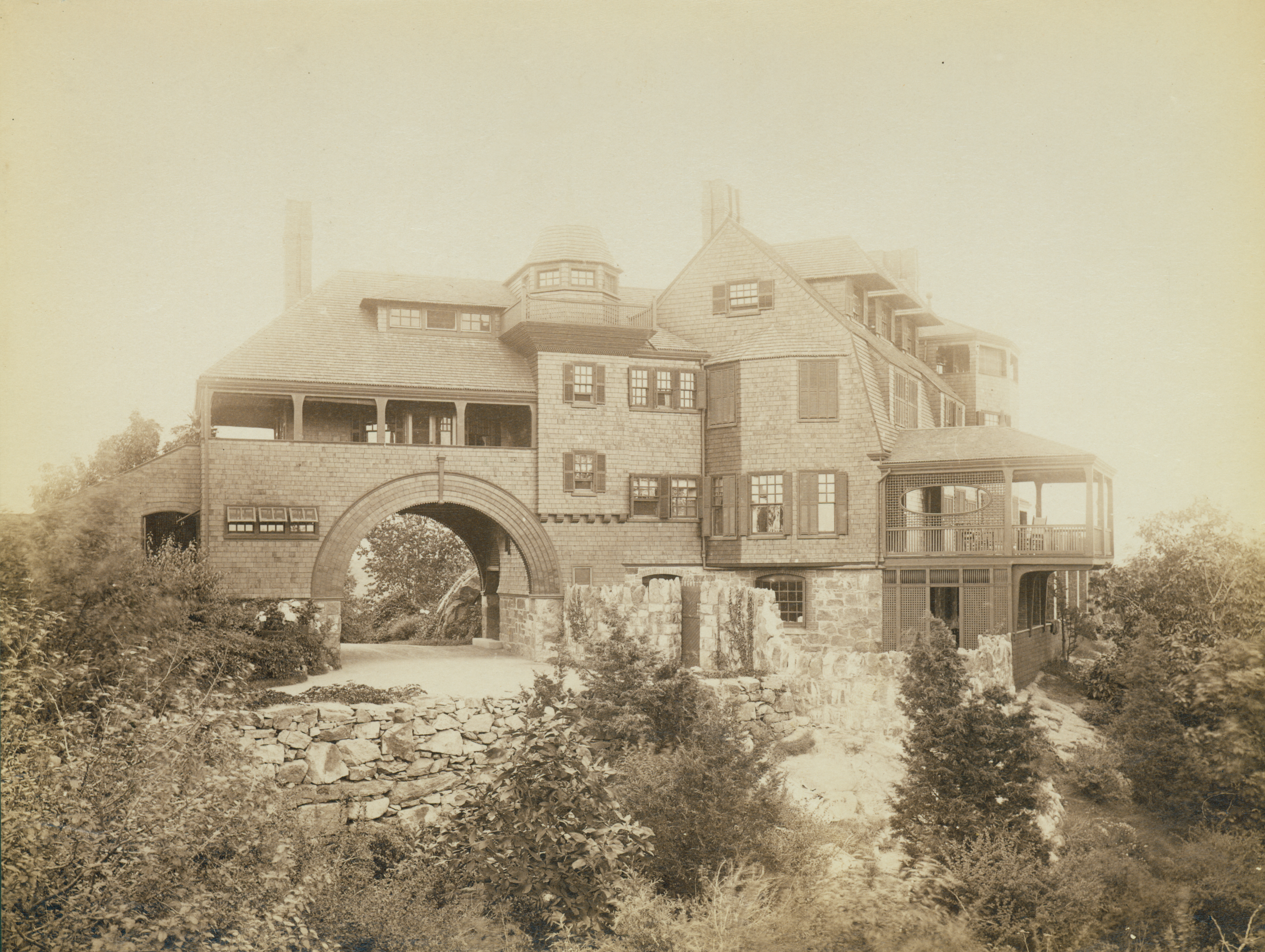
- Kragsyde, from the south, c. 1890
- Interactive map of the Kragsyde area

General information
- Type: Summer cottage Shingle style
- Location: 27 Smith's Point Road; Manchester-by-the-Sea, Massachusetts
- Coordinates: 42.562222°N 70.771444°W
- Completed: 1885
- Demolished: 1929
- Cost: $60,000 (1885)
- Owner: George Nixon Black Jr.

Technical details
- Floor count: 3.5

Design and construction
- Architects: Peabody & Stearns; Frederick Law Olmsted (landscape design)
- Main contractor: Roberts & Hoare

Kragsyde (1883–85 – 1929) was a Shingle style mansion designed by the Boston architectural firm of Peabody & Stearns and built at Manchester-by-the-Sea, Massachusetts. Demolished in 1929, it remains an icon of American architecture.

== History ==
Kragsyde was commissioned by George Nixon Black Jr. (1842–1928), heir to a Boston real estate fortune, who had been a Harvard classmate of architect Robert Swain Peabody. In 1882, Black paid $10,000 ($0.33 million today) for the 6 acre (2.4 ha) oceanfront plot on a peninsula called Smith's Point, overlooking Lobster Bay. Local contractor Roberts & Hoare built the house, 1883–85, for approximately $60,000 ($2.15 million today). Dramatically set upon a high rock outcropping, the rambling house was famous in its day and was published both in North America and Europe. Black and his sister occupied it every summer from May to October until the end of their lives.

Architectural historian Vincent Scully described Kragsyde as "a masterpiece," and stated that "Peabody & Stearns never again, to my knowledge, created a house of such quality."

== Design ==
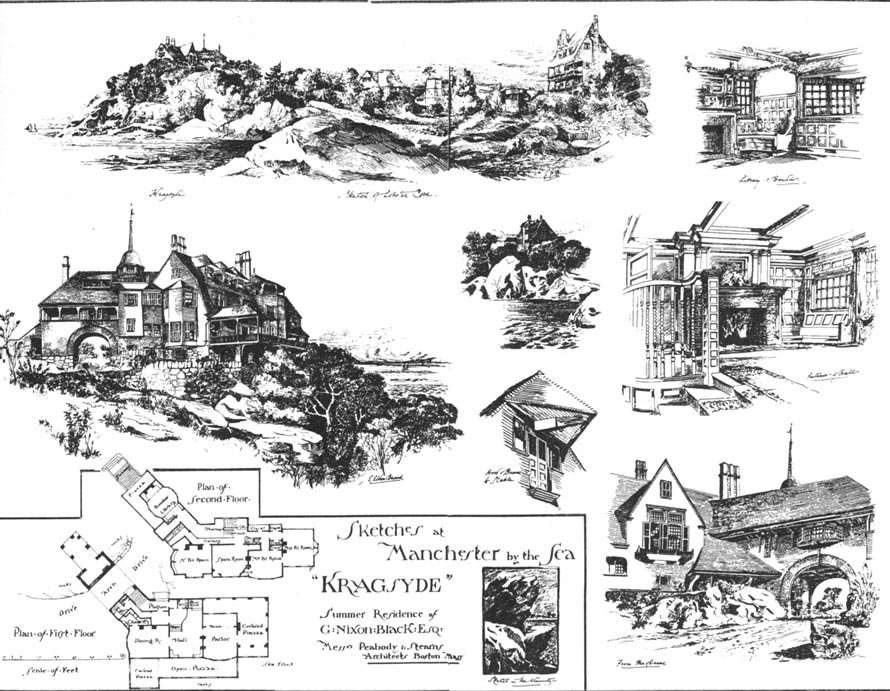
Sketches of Kragsyde (1885).

Kragsyde's footprint was that of broad "V" – the three-and-a-half-story main house (75 x 45 ft / 22.9 x 13.7 m) facing the Atlantic Ocean, and a secondary wing (20 x 55 ft / 6.1 x 16.8 m) set at a 45-degree angle. It was designed not only to maximize the views, but to capture the cool sea breezes. The house's most dramatic feature was a massive arch that formed a porte cochere and supported the loggia (open porch) and glass-enclosed billiard room above. Guests arriving by carriage would be dropped off under the arch, enter through the front door, and climb an interior stair to the main floor, which featured formal rooms for entertaining. Service rooms and the kitchen were located on the ground floor, and a service stair kept the servants out of sight. A dumbwaiter carried food from the kitchen to the butler's pantry on the main floor. A piazza (deck) the length of the house faced the ocean, and a covered section cantilevered out over the rocks. The parlor was surrounded on three sides by the piazza and an L-shaped covered porch. Stairs led down from the loggia to a series of terraces. The second floor contained bedrooms for the Blacks and their guests. The third floor contained bedrooms for servants.

The terraced landscape surrounding the house was designed by Frederick Law Olmsted. Some of his original walls survive.

== Subsequent “Kragsydes” ==
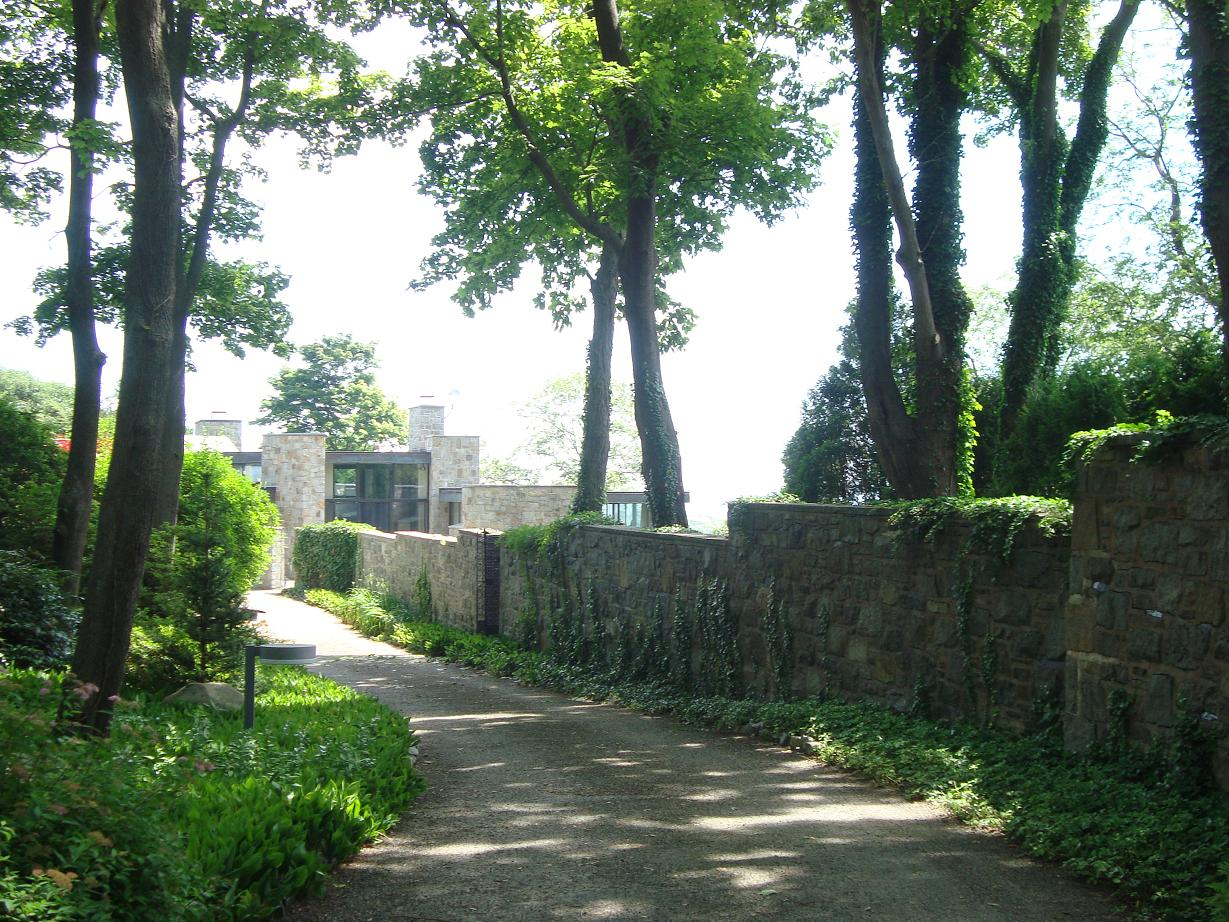
Kragsyde (1975), in 2011

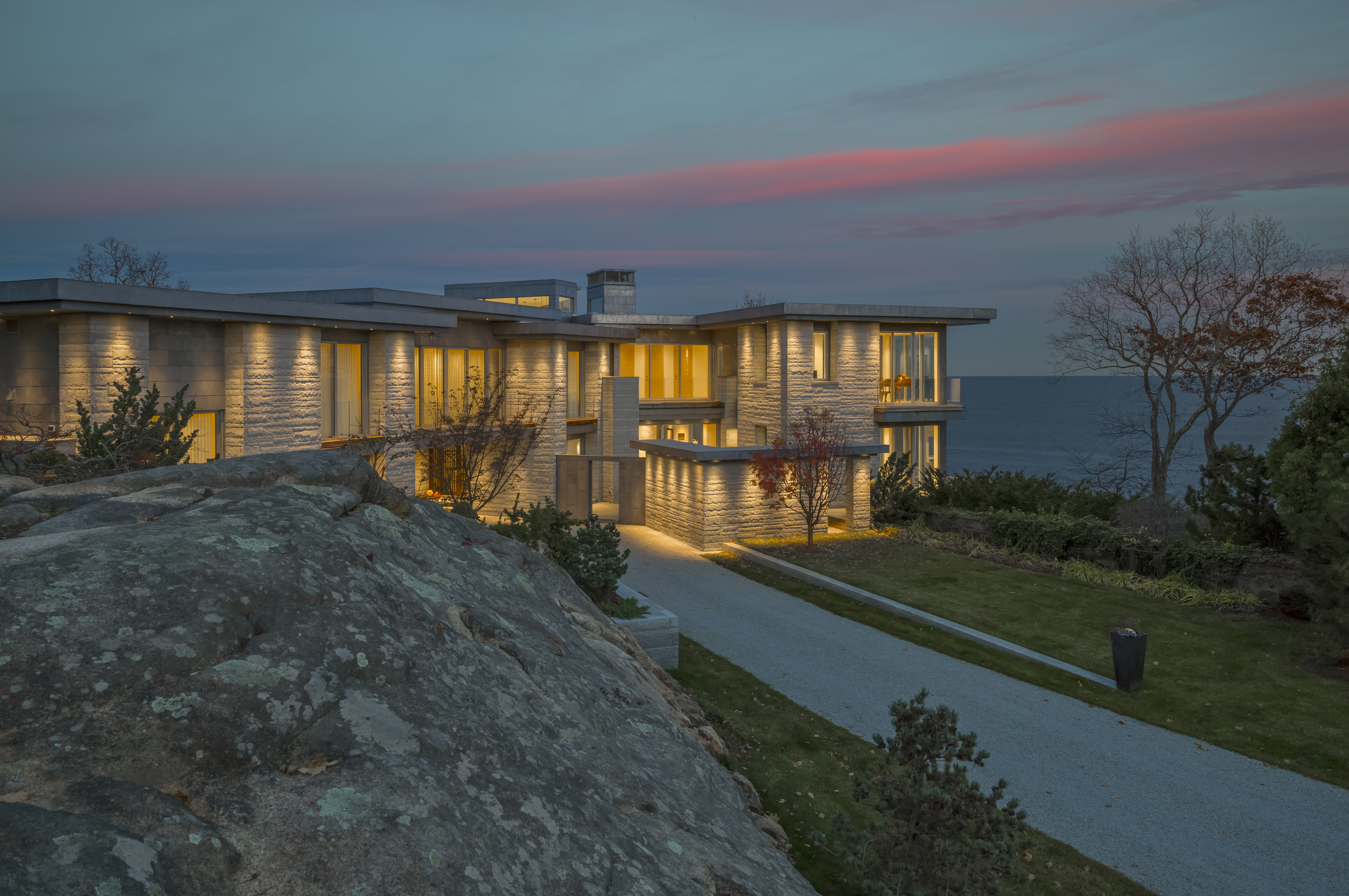
Kragsyde (2014), in 2016

The original Kragsyde was demolished in 1929. Three subsequent homes have been built upon its foundations:

- "Kragsyde" (1930s): A stuccoed house built by Boston lawyer Pierpont Stackpole.
- "Kragsyde" (1975), a.k.a. "The General's House": Like the original, it featured a wing with porte cochere set at a 45-degree angle to the main house. This was built for Georges Doriot, founder of American Research and Development Corporation, and his wife Edna.
- "Kragsyde" (2014): In 2014, a fourth house was built upon the original's foundations.

=== Related houses ===
- "Cragside" (1863), a house in Northumberland, England designed by Richard Norman Shaw, cited as influencing the design of Kragsyde.
- Kragsyde's carriage house (1882), also by Peabody & Stearns, stands at 29 Smith's Point Road.
- * "Kragsyde II" (1982), a house based on the original (but a mirror image) was built on Swan's Island, near Bar Harbor, Maine. Its location is 44°8′38.88″N 68°23′40.13″W
